= 2014 NBA Finals =

2014 basketball championship series

- The wordmark of the NBA Finals (2003–2017)
Team	Coach	Wins
San Antonio Spurs	Gregg Popovich	4
Miami Heat	Erik Spoelstra	1
- Dates: June 5–15
- MVP: Kawhi Leonard (San Antonio Spurs)
- Hall of Famers: Spurs: Tim Duncan (2020); Manu Ginóbili (2022); Tony Parker (2023); Heat: Ray Allen (2018); Chris Bosh (2021); Dwyane Wade (2023); Coaches: Gregg Popovich (2023); Officials: Danny Crawford (2025)
- Eastern finals: Heat defeated Pacers, 4–2
- Western finals: Spurs defeated Thunder, 4–2

The 2014 NBA Finals was the championship series of the National Basketball Association's (NBA) 2013–14 season and the conclusion of the season's playoffs, played from June 5 to 15, 2014. It was contested between two-time defending NBA champion and Eastern Conference champion Miami Heat and the Western Conference champion San Antonio Spurs. In a rematch, the Spurs defeated the Heat 4–1 for their 5th title overall. Kawhi Leonard was named the Finals Most Valuable Player (MVP), receiving 10 out of 11 votes.

The series served as a rematch from the previous NBA season, the 12th in Finals history, but only the fifth since the ABA–NBA merger in 1976. This was the first NBA Finals since 1984 to use the 2–2–1–1–1 format after the Board of Governors agreed to change the format from 2–3–2, which was used from 1985 to 2013. This was due to competitive disadvantages of a team with home court advantage having to play the middle three games on the road, as well as the increased use of chartered flights as opposed to commercial flights.

At the conclusion of this series, both teams would fall into a Finals appearance drought. The Heat would fail to advance to the NBA Finals until the shortened 2020 season, where they would lose to the Los Angeles Lakers in six games. The Spurs, who had strengthened their dynasty by winning their fifth title in 15 seasons, would fail to advance to the Finals until 2026, where they would face the New York Knicks in a losing effort but a rematch of the 1999 NBA Finals, the series that saw the Spurs win their first title and begin their dynasty.

== Background ==
=== Miami Heat ===
Led by their Big Three of LeBron James, Dwyane Wade, and Chris Bosh, the Miami Heat made their fourth straight appearance in the NBA Finals, following two back-to-back wins in the 2012 and 2013 playoffs.

They were the first team since the 1987 Boston Celtics to make it to four straight NBA Finals, and only the fourth team in NBA history to achieve that goal, besides the 1966 Boston Celtics (as a matter of fact, ten straight appearances), 1985 Los Angeles Lakers and the 1986-87 Boston Celtics. From 2015 to 2018 the Cleveland Cavaliers led by LeBron James also achieved the same feat, along with the Golden State Warriors those same years. They were seeking to become the first NBA team to three-peat since the 2002 Los Angeles Lakers. Heading into the postseason, the Heat had an 11–14 record in the last 25 games. In the first round, they eliminated the Charlotte Bobcats and won 4–0. In the Conference semifinals, they eliminated the Brooklyn Nets and won 4–1, despite being swept by Brooklyn in the regular season. In the Eastern Conference finals, they again played the Indiana Pacers in a rematch of the previous year's Conference finals. Miami won the series 4–2, eliminating the Indiana Pacers from the playoffs for the third straight year.

=== San Antonio Spurs ===
The Spurs had a deep roster, with no player averaging 30 minutes during the regular season. Their offense relied on ball movement, being called "one of the most beautiful-to-watch teams in the NBA" by USA Today.

This was the San Antonio Spurs's sixth appearance in the NBA Finals, and they headed to the postseason with the best record in the NBA and a franchise record 19-game winning streak, ending with a 22–4 run in their last 26 games. In the first round, they faced their Texas rivals, the Dallas Mavericks, who surprised the Spurs by taking the series to seven games despite the Spurs sweeping the Mavericks in the regular season for 2 consecutive years. San Antonio won 4–3. In the Conference semifinals, they eliminated the Portland Trail Blazers and won 4–1. In their third consecutive Conference finals, they eliminated the Oklahoma City Thunder and won the series 4–2, despite being swept by Oklahoma City in the regular season, and for the first time, they qualified for back-to-back Finals appearances.

=== Road to the Finals ===
San Antonio Spurs (Western Conference champion)		Miami Heat (Eastern Conference champion)
Western Conference: # / Team / W / L / PCT / GB / GP; 1 / z-San Antonio Spurs * / 62 / 20 / .756 / – / 82; 2 / y-Oklahoma City Thunder * / 59 / 23 / .720 / 3.0 / 82; 3 / y-Los Angeles Clippers * / 57 / 25 / .695 / 5.0 / 82; 4 / x-Houston Rockets / 54 / 28 / .659 / 8.0 / 82; 5 / x-Portland Trail Blazers / 54 / 28 / .659 / 8.0 / 82; 6 / x-Golden State Warriors / 51 / 31 / .622 / 11.0 / 82; 7 / x-Memphis Grizzlies / 50 / 32 / .610 / 12.0 / 82; 8 / x-Dallas Mavericks / 49 / 33 / .598 / 13.0 / 82; 9 / Phoenix Suns / 48 / 34 / .585 / 14.0 / 82; 10 / Minnesota Timberwolves / 40 / 42 / .488 / 22.0 / 82; 11 / Denver Nuggets / 36 / 46 / .439 / 26.0 / 82; 12 / New Orleans Pelicans / 34 / 48 / .415 / 28.0 / 82; 13 / Sacramento Kings / 28 / 54 / .341 / 34.0 / 82; 14 / Los Angeles Lakers / 27 / 55 / .329 / 35.0 / 82; 15 / Utah Jazz / 25 / 57 / .305 / 37.0 / 82; 1st seed in the West, best league record	Regular season	Eastern Conference: # / Team / W / L / PCT / GB / GP; 1 / c-Indiana Pacers * / 56 / 26 / .683 / – / 82; 2 / y-Miami Heat * / 54 / 28 / .659 / 2.0 / 82; 3 / y-Toronto Raptors * / 48 / 34 / .585 / 8.0 / 82; 4 / x-Chicago Bulls / 48 / 34 / .585 / 8.0 / 82; 5 / x-Washington Wizards / 44 / 38 / .537 / 12.0 / 82; 6 / x-Brooklyn Nets / 44 / 38 / .537 / 12.0 / 82; 7 / x-Charlotte Bobcats / 43 / 39 / .524 / 13.0 / 82; 8 / x-Atlanta Hawks / 38 / 44 / .463 / 18.0 / 82; 9 / New York Knicks / 37 / 45 / .451 / 19.0 / 82; 10 / Cleveland Cavaliers / 33 / 49 / .402 / 23.0 / 82; 11 / Detroit Pistons / 29 / 53 / .354 / 27.0 / 82; 12 / Boston Celtics / 25 / 57 / .305 / 31.0 / 82; 13 / Orlando Magic / 23 / 59 / .280 / 33.0 / 82; 14 / Philadelphia 76ers / 19 / 63 / .232 / 37.0 / 82; 15 / Milwaukee Bucks / 15 / 67 / .183 / 41.0 / 82; 2nd seed in the East, 5th (tied) best league record
Defeated the 8th seeded Dallas Mavericks, 4–3	First round	Defeated the 7th seeded Charlotte Bobcats, 4–0
Defeated the 5th seeded Portland Trail Blazers, 4–1	Conference semifinals	Defeated the 6th seeded Brooklyn Nets, 4–1
Defeated the 2nd seeded Oklahoma City Thunder, 4–2	Conference finals	Defeated the 1st seeded Indiana Pacers, 4–2

=== Regular season series ===
The regular season series was split 1–1, with each team winning at home:

January 26, 2014

Recap

San Antonio Spurs 101, Miami Heat 113

American Airlines Arena, Miami, Florida

March 6, 2014

Recap

Miami Heat 87, San Antonio Spurs 111

AT&T Center, San Antonio, Texas

== Series summary ==
Game	Date	Road team	Result	Home team
Game 1	June 5	Miami Heat	95–110 (0–1)	San Antonio Spurs
Game 2	June 8	Miami Heat	98–96 (1–1)	San Antonio Spurs
Game 3	June 10	San Antonio Spurs	111–92 (2–1)	Miami Heat
Game 4	June 12	San Antonio Spurs	107–86 (3–1)	Miami Heat
Game 5	June 15	Miami Heat	87–104 (1–4)	San Antonio Spurs

== Game summaries ==
All times are in Eastern Daylight Time (UTC−4)

The Spurs rebounded from their seven-game loss to the Heat in the 2013 Finals to win the series, 4–1, for the franchise's fifth NBA championship. After winning their first four over nine seasons, this was their first since 2007. They defeated Miami by margins of at least 15 points in each of their four wins and also outscored them by an average of 14.0 points per game in the series, which was the largest differential in Finals history at the time. The Spurs finished the playoffs with 12 wins by 15 points or more, the most ever in the postseason. Miami had won 11 straight playoffs series, which was the fifth longest in league history.

The Spurs' Kawhi Leonard was named the Finals MVP after leading the team in scoring in each of the final three games, averaging 23.7 points and shooting 68.5 percent, after scoring just nine in each of the first two games Overall, he averaged 17.8 points on 61.2 percent shooting in the series, the highest field goal percentage of any Finals MVP, and shot 65 percent when guarded by LeBron James in the series. Leonard also led the team with a 57.9 three-point field goal percentage. Leonard was the third-youngest recipient of the award (22 years and 351 days old) since its inception in 1969, and the youngest since Magic Johnson in 1982.

Tim Duncan of the Spurs led all players in the series with 50 rebounds. He was followed by teammate Boris Diaw (43), who was inserted into the starting lineup beginning in Game 3. Diaw led all players in the series in assists (29).

=== Game 1 ===
ABC

June 5
9:00 pm

Boxscore

Miami Heat 95, San Antonio Spurs 110
Scoring by quarter: 20–26, 29–28, 29–20, 17–36
Pts: LeBron James 25; Rebs: Chris Bosh 9 Asts: Norris Cole 5	Pts: Tim Duncan 21; Rebs: Duncan, Diaw 10 each Asts: Manu Ginóbili 11
San Antonio leads series, 1–0

AT&T Center, San Antonio, Texas
Attendance: 18,581
Referees:
- No. 48 Scott Foster
- No. 8 Marc Davis
- No. 41 Ken Mauer

Tim Duncan scored 21 points and had 10 rebounds to lead the Spurs to a 110–95 win in Game 1. The game featured the AT&T Center's malfunctioning air-conditioning system, which caused temperatures in the arena to exceed 90 °F (32 °C) in the second half. The conditions caused Miami's LeBron James to dehydrate and experience cramps, limiting him to just five minutes of playing time in the fourth quarter. With James on the bench, San Antonio went on a 16–3 run in the game's final four minutes, and outscored the Heat 36–17 in the fourth quarter.

James, who also had cramps in the finals two years earlier, finished the game with 25 points while playing only 33 minutes. Manu Ginóbili had 16 points and 11 assists and Tony Parker contributed 19 points and eight assists for the Spurs, who shot 59 percent for the game despite committing 23 turnovers.

The Spurs shot 14/16 in the 4th quarter. The Spurs' 87.5% conversion rating in the 4th quarter was the most efficient field goal conversion rating for any team in any quarter in NBA Finals history.

=== Game 2 ===
ABC

June 8
8:00 pm

Boxscore

Miami Heat 98, San Antonio Spurs 96
Scoring by quarter: 19–26, 24–17, 34–35, 21–18
Pts: LeBron James 35; Rebs: LeBron James 10; Asts: Wade, Chalmers 4 each	Pts: Tony Parker 21; Rebs: Tim Duncan 15; Asts: Tony Parker 7
Series tied, 1–1

AT&T Center, San Antonio, Texas
Attendance: 18,581
Referees:
- No. 43 Danny Crawford
- No. 19 James Capers
- No. 23 Jason Phillips

James rebounded from cramps in Game 1 with 35 points and 10 rebounds to lead Miami to a 98–96 win to tie the series. Bosh made the go-ahead three-point field goal on a pass from James with 1:18 remaining in the game, as the Heat won their 13th straight following a postseason loss. Temperatures in the AT&T Center were comfortable for the game after a broken circuit breaker was repaired following Game 1.

After enduring criticism for not finishing the previous game, James started slowly in the first quarter, shooting 1-for-4 with three turnovers. Meanwhile, the Spurs began the game making 10 of their first 15 shots. James then made 11 of his next 13, and finished 14-for-22 while playing 38 minutes. He had 11 points in the second quarter, when the Heat overcome an early 11-point deficit. The score remained close through the remainder of the game. The Spurs held a two-point lead with 6:43 remaining in the fourth quarter, when Miami's Mario Chalmers elbowed Parker in the midsection for a flagrant foul. Tony Parker and Tim Duncan then combined to miss four straight free throws. James scored 33 in the final three quarters; he had 22 in the second half, when every shot he made was from 18 feet (5.5 m) or further. He also made a key strip of Parker late in the game.

Bosh finished with 18 points, and Wade and Rashard Lewis added 14 for Miami. Parker had 21 points and Duncan scored 18 points with 15 rebounds for the Spurs, who had won eight consecutive home games by at least 15 points. Parker passed Michael Jordan for eighth place on the NBA's all-time playoff assist list.

=== Game 3 ===
ABC

June 10
9:00 pm

Boxscore

San Antonio Spurs 111, Miami Heat 92
Scoring by quarter: 41–25, 30–25, 15–25, 25–17
Pts: Kawhi Leonard 29; Rebs: Tim Duncan 6 Asts: Parker, Mills 4 each	Pts: James, Wade 22 each Rebs: James, Andersen 5 each Asts: LeBron James 7
San Antonio leads series, 2–1

American Airlines Arena, Miami, Florida
Attendance: 19,900
Referees:
- No. 13 Monty McCutchen
- No. 25 Tony Brothers
- No. 28 Zach Zarba

The Spurs took a 2–1 lead in the series after a career-high 29 points from Leonard and a Finals-record 75.8% shooting effort from the team during the first half. Leonard, limited to only 18 points in the first two games, made his first six shots and was 10-of-13 for the game. San Antonio led by as many as 25 and were comfortably ahead most of the game, including 71–50 at the half. The 21-point margin was the largest halftime lead in the Finals by a road team since Game 3 in 1996 by the Chicago Bulls against the Seattle SuperSonics. The Heat scored 10-straight points in the third quarter to bring the score to 81–74, the closest they would get to the Spurs the rest of the game.

San Antonio's insertion of Boris Diaw into the starting lineup created more ball movement, as the Spurs achieved the first 70-point first half in the Finals since the Los Angeles Lakers' 75 from Game 2 in 1987 against the Boston Celtics. The Heat, who had been 8–0 at home in the playoffs, were led by James and Wade with 22 points apiece. Miami's 20 turnovers were their playoff-high, with James committing his Finals career-high of 7.

=== Game 4 ===
ABC

June 12
9:00 pm

Boxscore

San Antonio Spurs 107, Miami Heat 86
Scoring by quarter: 26–17, 29–19, 26–21, 26–29
Pts: Kawhi Leonard 20; Rebs: Kawhi Leonard 14; Asts: Boris Diaw 9	Pts: LeBron James 28; Rebs: LeBron James 8 Asts: Mario Chalmers 5
San Antonio leads series, 3–1

American Airlines Arena, Miami, Florida
Attendance: 19,900
Referees:
- No. 17 Joe Crawford
- No. 24 Mike Callahan
- No. 49 Tom Washington

Leonard had 20 points and 14 rebounds in another rout of the Heat, as the Spurs won 107–86 to take a 3–1 lead in the series; no team had ever come back from a 3–1 deficit in the Finals until two years later. San Antonio again built a large lead on the road before halftime, taking a 55–33 lead in the second quarter after scoring seven consecutive points, culminated by a soaring dunk by Leonard. The Spurs defense held Miami to just 35 percent shooting in the first half after allowing the Heat to shoot 50 percent overall in the prior game. The Heat had followed their prior 13 playoff losses with a win.

The Heat struggled to defend the Spurs' crisp ball movement, orchestrated by Diaw and his game-high nine assists. San Antonio made 57 percent of its field goals, with Parker scoring 19 points, and Duncan adding 10 points and 11 rebounds to surpass Magic Johnson for the most double-doubles in NBA Playoffs history (158). Duncan also eclipsed Kareem Abdul-Jabbar's previous mark (8,851) for most postseason minutes played. (Note: Duncan broke the records in his 233rd playoff game. Johnson's previous double-double record was over 190 games, while Abdul-Jabbar's mark for minutes was over 237 games.) Miami was led by James, who had 28 points and eight rebounds, but their other starters combined for only 28 points on 32 percent shooting. Wade made only 1 of 10 from the field through three quarters, finishing with 10 points.

=== Game 5 ===
ABC

June 15
8:00 pm

Boxscore

Miami Heat 87, San Antonio Spurs 104
Scoring by quarter: 29–22, 11–25, 18–30, 29–27
Pts: LeBron James 31; Rebs: LeBron James 10; Asts: LeBron James 5	Pts: Kawhi Leonard 22; Rebs: Kawhi Leonard 10; Asts: Boris Diaw 6
San Antonio wins NBA Finals, 4–1

AT&T Center, San Antonio, Texas
Attendance: 18,581
Referees:
- No. 48 Scott Foster
- No. 8 Marc Davis
- No. 41 Ken Mauer

The Spurs won 104–87 to win the championship in five games and avenge last season's loss to the Heat in seven games. Leonard had 22 points and 10 rebounds for the Spurs, and was named the Finals MVP. James had 17 first-quarter points for the Heat, who got off to a fast start in building an early 22–6 lead. San Antonio bounced back to outscore Miami 37–13 from the beginning of the second quarter through the middle of the third.

Ginóbili had 19 points and four assists, and Patty Mills scored 17 points off the bench for the Spurs. James finished with 31 points and 10 rebounds, while Bosh had 13 points and Wade added 13 but shot only 4-for-12 from the field.

== Rosters ==
=== San Antonio Spurs ===
2013–14 San Antonio Spurs roster
Players

Pos.	No.	Player	Height	Weight	DOB	From
F/C	11	Jeff Ayres	6 ft 9 in (2.06 m)	250 lb (113 kg)	1987–04–29	Arizona State
F/C	16	Aron Baynes	6 ft 10 in (2.08 m)	260 lb (118 kg)	1986–12–09	Washington State
G	3	Marco Belinelli	6 ft 5 in (1.96 m)	195 lb (88 kg)	1986–03–25	Italy
F/C	15	Matt Bonner	6 ft 10 in (2.08 m)	235 lb (107 kg)	1980–04–05	Florida
F	23	Austin Daye	6 ft 11 in (2.11 m)	200 lb (91 kg)	1988–06–05	Gonzaga
F/C	33	Boris Diaw	6 ft 8 in (2.03 m)	235 lb (107 kg)	1982–04–16	France
F/C	21	Tim Duncan	6 ft 11 in (2.11 m)	255 lb (116 kg)	1976–04–25	Wake Forest
G	20	Manu Ginóbili	6 ft 6 in (1.98 m)	205 lb (93 kg)	1977–07–28	Argentina
G/F	4	Danny Green	6 ft 6 in (1.98 m)	210 lb (95 kg)	1987–06–22	North Carolina
F	7	Damion James	6 ft 7 in (2.01 m)	225 lb (102 kg)	1987–10–07	Texas
G	5	Cory Joseph	6 ft 3 in (1.91 m)	185 lb (84 kg)	1991–08–20	Texas
G/F	2	Kawhi Leonard	6 ft 7 in (2.01 m)	225 lb (102 kg)	1991–06–29	San Diego State
G	8	Patty Mills	6 ft 0 in (1.83 m)	185 lb (84 kg)	1988–08–11	Saint Mary's
G	9	Tony Parker	6 ft 2 in (1.88 m)	185 lb (84 kg)	1982–05–17	France
C	22	Tiago Splitter	6 ft 11 in (2.11 m)	240 lb (109 kg)	1985–01–01	Brazil

Coaches
Head coach
- Gregg Popovich
Assistant(s)
- Jim Boylen
- Chip Engelland
- Chad Forcier
- Sean Marks
- Ime Udoka

Legend
- (DP) Unsigned draft pick
- (FA) Free agent
- (S) Suspended
- (DL) On assignment to D-League affiliate
- Injured

Roster
Updated: April 13, 2014

=== Miami Heat ===
2013–14 Miami Heat roster
Players

Pos.	No.	Player	Height	Weight	DOB	From
G	34	Ray Allen	6 ft 5 in (1.96 m)	205 lb (93 kg)	1975–07–20	Connecticut
F/C	11	Chris Andersen	6 ft 10 in (2.08 m)	245 lb (111 kg)	1978–07–07	Blinn
F	31	Shane Battier	6 ft 8 in (2.03 m)	220 lb (100 kg)	1978–09–09	Duke
F	8	Michael Beasley	6 ft 10 in (2.08 m)	235 lb (107 kg)	1989–01–09	Kansas State
F/C	1	Chris Bosh	6 ft 11 in (2.11 m)	235 lb (107 kg)	1984–03–24	Georgia Tech
G	15	Mario Chalmers	6 ft 2 in (1.88 m)	190 lb (86 kg)	1986–05–19	Kansas
G	30	Norris Cole	6 ft 2 in (1.88 m)	175 lb (79 kg)	1988–10–13	Cleveland State
G	0	Toney Douglas	6 ft 2 in (1.88 m)	185 lb (84 kg)	1986–03–16	Florida State
C	7	Justin Hamilton	7 ft 0 in (2.13 m)	260 lb (118 kg)	1990–04–01	LSU
F/C	40	Udonis Haslem	6 ft 8 in (2.03 m)	235 lb (107 kg)	1980–06–09	Florida
F	6	LeBron James	6 ft 8 in (2.03 m)	250 lb (113 kg)	1984–12–30	St. Vincent–St. Mary HS (OH)
G/F	22	James Jones	6 ft 8 in (2.03 m)	215 lb (98 kg)	1980–10–04	Miami (FL)
F	9	Rashard Lewis	6 ft 10 in (2.08 m)	235 lb (107 kg)	1979–08–08	Alief Elsik HS (TX)
C	20	Greg Oden	7 ft 0 in (2.13 m)	273 lb (124 kg)	1988–01–22	Ohio State
G	3	Dwyane Wade	6 ft 4 in (1.93 m)	220 lb (100 kg)	1982–01–17	Marquette

Coaches
Head coach
- Erik Spoelstra
Assistant(s)
- Bob McAdoo
- Ron Rothstein
- David Fizdale
- Juwan Howard (Player Development)
- Dan Craig (Player Development)

Legend
- (DP) Unsigned draft pick
- (FA) Free agent
- (S) Suspended
- (DL) On assignment to D-League affiliate
- Injured

Roster
Updated: March 23, 2014

== Player statistics ==
Legend
GP	Games played	GS	Games started	MPG	Minutes per game
FG%	Field-goal percentage	3P%	3-point field-goal percentage	FT%	Free-throw percentage
RPG	Rebounds per game	APG	Assists per game	SPG	Steals per game
BPG	Blocks per game	PPG	Points per game

San Antonio Spurs

San Antonio Spurs statistics
Player	GP	GS	MPG	FG%	3P%	FT%	RPG	APG	SPG	BPG	PPG
Jeff Ayres	3	0	2.2	1.000	.000	.750	0.7	0.3	0.0	0.0	1.7
Aron Baynes	3	0	2.1	1.000	.000	1.000	0.7	0.0	0.0	0.0	2.0
Marco Belinelli	5	0	11.8	.471	.444	.750	1.2	0.6	0.2	0.0	4.6
Matt Bonner	4	0	6.7	1.000	.000	.750	0.8	1.3	0.3	0.0	1.3
Boris Diaw	5	3	35.2	.364	.333	.500	8.6	5.8	0.8	0.2	6.2
Tim Duncan	5	5	33.1	.569	.000	.679	10.0	2.0	0.4	0.8	15.4
Manu Ginóbili	5	0	28.7	.500	.417	.875	3.0	4.4	1.0	0.2	14.4
Danny Green	5	5	21.1	.531	.450	.750	2.0	1.2	2.0	0.4	9.2
Kawhi Leonard	5	5	33.4	.612	.579	.783	6.4	2.0	1.6	1.2	17.8
Patty Mills	5	0	15.2	.543	.565	.000	1.4	1.6	0.4	0.0	10.2
Cory Joseph	3	0	2.5	.333	.000	.000	0.0	0.0	0.0	0.0	0.7
Tony Parker	5	5	35.2	.479	.417	.750	0.4	4.6	0.8	0.0	18.0
Tiago Splitter	5	2	16.8	.706	.000	.778	3.4	2.0	0.6	0.6	6.2

Miami Heat

Miami Heat statistics
Player	GP	GS	MPG	FG%	3P%	FT%	RPG	APG	SPG	BPG	PPG
Ray Allen	5	1	31.0	.415	.409	.857	3.0	1.8	1.6	0.2	9.8
Chris Andersen	5	0	17.9	.250	.000	.700	5.6	0.0	0.4	0.6	2.6
Shane Battier	4	0	8.2	.000	.000	.000	0.3	0.3	0.3	0.0	0.0
Michael Beasley	1	0	17.0	.571	.000	.333	3.0	1.0	0.0	0.0	9.0
Chris Bosh	5	5	36.3	.549	.385	.818	5.2	1.0	0.8	0.2	14.0
Mario Chalmers	5	4	23.1	.333	.143	.778	1.4	2.8	1.0	0.2	4.4
Norris Cole	5	0	16.7	.316	.143	.750	1.2	1.8	0.4	0.0	3.2
Toney Douglas	3	0	3.4	.250	.250	.500	1.0	0.7	0.0	0.0	1.3
Udonis Haslem	4	0	5.6	.400	.000	.000	1.0	0.0	0.0	0.3	1.0
LeBron James	5	5	37.8	.571	.519	.793	7.8	4.0	2.0	0.4	28.2
James Jones	4	0	3.4	.571	.500	.000	0.5	0.0	0.0	0.0	2.8
Rashard Lewis	5	5	22.9	.500	.455	.500	1.6	0.4	0.0	0.4	8.6
Greg Oden	2	0	1.5	.000	.000	.000	0.0	0.0	0.0	0.0	0.0
Dwyane Wade	5	5	34.5	.438	.333	.692	3.8	2.6	1.6	0.0	15.2

== Broadcast ==
In the United States, the NBA Finals aired on ABC (including for the second straight year local stations KSAT-TV in San Antonio and WPLG in Miami) with Mike Breen (play-by-play) and Jeff Van Gundy (analyst) as commentators. Also beginning this Finals, and for the first time since 2011, Mark Jackson returned as analyst after being fired by the Golden State Warriors early in the season. ESPN Radio aired it as well and had Kevin Calabro and Hubie Brown as commentators.

Game	Ratings (households)	American audience (in millions)
1	9.0	14.85
2	9.0	15.13
3	9.0	14.78
4	9.3	14.96
5	10.3	18.00

== Aftermath ==
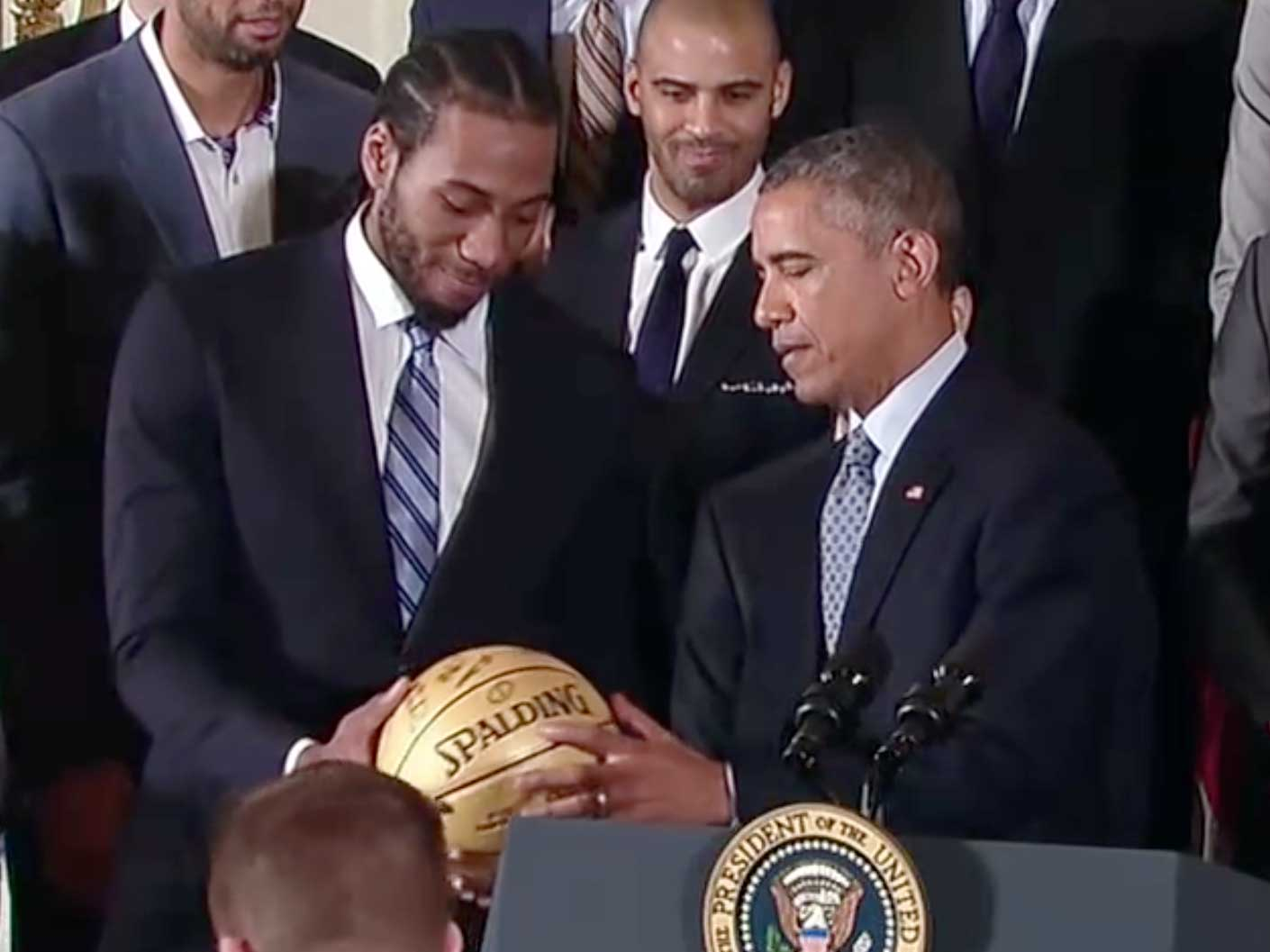
President Obama and Finals MVP Kawhi Leonard

This was an end of the Heatles-era for Miami, who would lose LeBron James in free agency back to the Cleveland Cavaliers. Ray Allen would not officially retire until years later, but he did not play in another game after the 2014 NBA Finals. In 2016, Chris Bosh's career came to an abrupt end after a career-ending blood clotting condition. In that same summer, Dwyane Wade's 12-year tenure with the Heat ended after a contract dispute with team president Pat Riley. Wade signed with his hometown team, the Chicago Bulls, but later reconciled with Riley and finished his career with the Heat. By the time of their next NBA Finals team in 2020, the only Miami Heat player from 2014 was Udonis Haslem. The Heat have lost their last three NBA Finals they have participated in (2014, 2020, and 2023).

"It's the U.N. of basketball teams. And it shows the way that this wonderful sport has become an international sport. Some people have, rightfully, started calling it -- the Spur’s style of basketball “the beautiful game.” And when you look at the passing and guys back-cutting the hoop and sharing the basketball, you see basketball the way it should be played."

— President Barack Obama on the 2013–14 San Antonio Spurs

Although the Spurs remained a competitive team in the following years, even winning a team record 67 games in 2015–16, this was the last NBA Finals for many of the team's players and personnel, such as Tim Duncan, Manu Ginóbili, Tony Parker, and head coach Gregg Popovich. After clashing with the team's medical staff, the Spurs sent Kawhi Leonard (and Danny Green) to the Toronto Raptors just before the start of the 2018–2019 season. With the Raptors, Kawhi would help lead the team to their first franchise championship and win another NBA Finals MVP. The Spurs did not make their next NBA Finals appearance until 2026.

This was the last NBA Finals to date to feature special on-court decals within the playing surface. Due to player safety concerns, the NBA opted not to place any special decals on the court beginning with the 2015 NBA Finals, though starting with the 2018 Finals, the Finals logo returned on the court, albeit in front of the player benches. Starting with the 2026 Finals, specially designed courts will be used, using each team's primary court but with both the Finals logo and the Larry O'Brien Trophy painted at center court (as opposed to sticker decals or virtual ads during TV broadcasts).
