= 2013–14 Miami Heat season =

NBA professional basketball team season

- Conference champions
- Division champions
- Head coach: Erik Spoelstra
- President: Pat Riley
- General manager: Andy Elisburg
- Owner: Micky Arison
- Arena: American Airlines Arena

Results
- Record: 54–28 (.659)
- Place: Division: 1st (Southeast); Conference: 2nd (Eastern)
- Playoff finish: NBA Finals (lost to Spurs 1–4)
- Stats at Basketball Reference

Local media
- Television: Sun Sports
- Radio: 790 The Ticket

The 2013–14 Miami Heat season was the 26th season of the franchise in the National Basketball Association (NBA). They entered the season as three-time defending Eastern Conference champions and as two-time defending NBA champions, having defeated the Oklahoma City Thunder in the 2012 NBA Finals in five games and the San Antonio Spurs in the 2013 NBA Finals in seven games. In defeating the Spurs in 2013, the Heat handed the Spurs their first-ever series loss in the NBA Finals.

The 2013–2014 season was the Heat's fourth and final season playing with the "Big Three" of LeBron James, Dwyane Wade, and Chris Bosh, and ended with a 54–28 record, despite a 43–14 record early in March. It was the lowest record (.659) in the Big Three era (with the exception of the 2011–12 NBA season, which was a shortened season due to a lockout). It was also their sixth season under head coach Erik Spoelstra and Ray Allen's last season in the NBA after 18 years in the league. Although he was a free agent during the 2014–15 and 2015–16 seasons, and despite rumors of a possible return to the league to play for the Milwaukee Bucks, Golden State Warriors, or Boston Celtics, Allen officially announced his retirement on November 1, 2016, and was one of two remaining active players from the 1996 draft, the other being Kobe Bryant, whom announced his retirement the season prior.

The Heat swept the Charlotte Bobcats in the first round and defeated the Brooklyn Nets in five games in the conference semifinals. In a rematch of the previous year's Eastern Conference finals, the Heat defeated the Indiana Pacers in six games (ending the Pacers' season for the third year in a row) to become the first team to win four consecutive Eastern Conference championships since the Boston Celtics did so in the 1984–1987 seasons. Miami's quest for a three-peat ended when the San Antonio Spurs, whom they met in a rematch of the 2013 NBA Finals, won the NBA Finals by a 4–1 margin. Following the season, James left the Heat in free agency to rejoin the Cleveland Cavaliers, whom he previously played for from 2003 to 2010. This would also be the last time the Heat would appear in the Finals until 2020, wherein they lost to the Los Angeles Lakers (led by former Heat player James) 4 games to 2.

== Key dates ==
- June 27: The 2013 NBA draft took place at Barclays Center in Brooklyn, New York.
- July 1: 2013 NBA free agency began.
- March 3: LeBron James had a career-high 61 points against the Charlotte Bobcats. His 61 points were also a franchise-high, breaking Glen Rice's record, who scored 56 points against the Orlando Magic in 1995.
- April 28: The Heat completed a sweep over the Charlotte Bobcats in the Eastern Conference first round, advancing to the conference semi-finals.
- May 14: The Heat avenged their regular-season sweep loss over the Brooklyn Nets in Game 5 of the Eastern Conference Semi-finals, by a game-saving steal by LeBron James from Joe Johnson. They advanced to the Eastern Conference finals for the fourth consecutive year.
- May 30: The Heat defeated the Indiana Pacers in game six of the Eastern Conference finals, to advance to the NBA Finals for the fourth consecutive year.
- June 15: Their season ended when they lost to the San Antonio Spurs in Game 5 of the 2014 NBA Finals, 104–87. Their loss also marked the first time that the Heat have been eliminated from title contention since their loss to the Dallas Mavericks in Game 6 of the 2011 NBA Finals.

== Draft picks ==
The Heat did not have a pick in the 2013 NBA draft.

== Future draft picks ==
=== Credits ===
2014 or 2015 first-round draft pick from Philadelphia

Philadelphia's first-round pick to Miami protected for selections 1–14 in 2014 or 1–14 in 2015; if Philadelphia has not conveyed a first-round pick to Miami by 2015, then Philadelphia will instead convey its 2015 2nd-round pick and 2016 2nd-round pick to Miami [Miami-Philadelphia, 6/28/2012]

=== Debits ===
2015 first-round draft pick to Cleveland

Miami's 1st-round pick to Cleveland protected for selections 1–10 in 2015 or 1–10 in 2016 or unprotected in 2017 [Cleveland-Miami, 7/9/2010]

2017 second-round draft pick to Atlanta

Miami's second-round pick to Atlanta protected for selections 31–40 in 2017 or unprotected in 2018 [Atlanta-Miami, 6/27/2013]

== Roster ==
2013–14 Miami Heat roster
Players

Pos.	No.	Player	Height	Weight	DOB	From
SG	34	Ray Allen	6 ft 5 in (1.96 m)	205 lb (93 kg)	1975-07-20	Connecticut
C	11	Chris Andersen	6 ft 10 in (2.08 m)	245 lb (111 kg)	1978-07-07	Blinn
SF	31	Shane Battier	6 ft 8 in (2.03 m)	220 lb (100 kg)	1978-09-09	Duke
SF	8	Michael Beasley	6 ft 9 in (2.06 m)	235 lb (107 kg)	1989-01-09	Kansas State
C	1	Chris Bosh	6 ft 11 in (2.11 m)	235 lb (107 kg)	1984-03-24	Georgia Tech
PG	15	Mario Chalmers	6 ft 2 in (1.88 m)	190 lb (86 kg)	1986-05-19	Kansas
PG	30	Norris Cole	6 ft 2 in (1.88 m)	175 lb (79 kg)	1988-10-13	Cleveland State
PG	0	Toney Douglas	6 ft 2 in (1.88 m)	185 lb (84 kg)	1986-03-16	Florida State
C	7	Justin Hamilton	7 ft 0 in (2.13 m)	260 lb (118 kg)	1990-04-01	LSU
PF	40	Udonis Haslem	6 ft 8 in (2.03 m)	235 lb (107 kg)	1980-06-09	Florida
PF	6	LeBron James	6 ft 8 in (2.03 m)	250 lb (113 kg)	1984-12-30	St. Vincent–St. Mary HS (OH)
SF	22	James Jones	6 ft 8 in (2.03 m)	215 lb (98 kg)	1980-10-04	Miami (FL)
SF	9	Rashard Lewis	6 ft 10 in (2.08 m)	235 lb (107 kg)	1979-08-08	Alief Elsik HS (TX)
C	20	Greg Oden	7 ft 0 in (2.13 m)	273 lb (124 kg)	1988-01-22	Ohio State
SG	3	Dwyane Wade	6 ft 4 in (1.93 m)	220 lb (100 kg)	1982-01-17	Marquette

Coaches
Head coach
- Erik Spoelstra
Assistant(s)
- Bob McAdoo
- Ron Rothstein
- David Fizdale
- Juwan Howard (Player Development)
- Dan Craig (Player Development)

Legend
- (DP) Unsigned draft pick
- (FA) Free agent
- (S) Suspended
- (DL) On assignment to D-League affiliate
- Injured

Roster
Updated: 2014–03–23

== Pre-season ==
2013 pre-season game log
Total: 5–3 (home: 3–1; road: 2–2)
Pre-season: 5–3 (home: 3–1; road: 2–2)

Game	Date	Team	Score	High points	High rebounds	High assists	Location Attendance	Record
1	October 7	Atlanta	W 92–87	Chris Bosh (21)	Roger Mason, Jr. (6)	LeBron James (5)	American Airlines Arena; 19,600	1–0
2	October 10	@ Detroit	W 112–107	Chris Bosh (28)	Bosh, Wade, & Hamilton (4)	LeBron James (7)	Palace of Auburn Hills; 17,219	2–0
3	October 11	Charlotte	W 86–75	LeBron James (20)	Udonis Haslem (11)	Chalmers & Cole (4)	Sprint Center; 18,770	3–0
4	October 15	@ Washington	L 82–100	Wade & Battier (14)	Chris Bosh (8)	James, Chalmers, & Cole (4)	Verizon Center; 13,678	3–1
5	October 17	@ Brooklyn	L 62–86	James & Bosh (16)	Chris Bosh (9)	James & Chalmers (4)	Barclays Center; 17,732	3–2
6	October 19	San Antonio	W 121–96	Dwyane Wade (25)	Udonis Haslem (8)	Dwyane Wade (7)	American Airlines Arena; 20,080	4–2
7	October 23	@ New Orleans	W 108–95	LeBron James (27)	Chris Bosh (9)	Bosh & Wade (7)	New Orleans Arena; 17,123	5–2
8	October 25	Brooklyn	L 87–108	Udonis Haslem (16)	Michael Beasley (6)	Mario Chalmers (6)	American Airlines Arena; 19,600	5–3

2013–14 season schedule

== Regular season ==
=== Standings ===
Southeast Division	W	L	PCT	GB	Home	Road	Div	GP
y-Miami Heat	54	28	.659	–	32‍–‍9	22‍–‍19	12–4	82
x-Washington Wizards	44	38	.537	10.0	22‍–‍19	22‍–‍19	10–6	82
x-Charlotte Bobcats	43	39	.524	11.0	25‍–‍16	18‍–‍23	6–10	82
x-Atlanta Hawks	38	44	.463	16.0	24‍–‍17	14‍–‍27	8–8	82
Orlando Magic	23	59	.280	31.0	19‍–‍22	4‍–‍37	4–12	82

Eastern Conference
#	Team	W	L	PCT	GB	GP
1	c-Indiana Pacers *	56	26	.683	–	82
2	y-Miami Heat *	54	28	.659	2.0	82
3	y-Toronto Raptors *	48	34	.585	8.0	82
4	x-Chicago Bulls	48	34	.585	8.0	82
5	x-Washington Wizards	44	38	.537	12.0	82
6	x-Brooklyn Nets	44	38	.537	12.0	82
7	x-Charlotte Bobcats	43	39	.524	13.0	82
8	x-Atlanta Hawks	38	44	.463	18.0	82
9	New York Knicks	37	45	.451	19.0	82
10	Cleveland Cavaliers	33	49	.402	23.0	82
11	Detroit Pistons	29	53	.354	27.0	82
12	Boston Celtics	25	57	.305	31.0	82
13	Orlando Magic	23	59	.280	33.0	82
14	Philadelphia 76ers	19	63	.232	37.0	82
15	Milwaukee Bucks	15	67	.183	41.0	82

=== Game log ===
2013–14 game log
Total: 54–28 (home: 32–9; road: 22–19)
October: 1–1 (home: 1–0; road: 0–1)

Game	Date	Team	Score	High points	High rebounds	High assists	Location Attendance	Record
1	October 29	Chicago	W 107–95	LeBron James (17)	Chris Andersen (8)	LeBron James (8)	American Airlines Arena; 19,964	1–0
2	October 30	@ Philadelphia	L 110–114	LeBron James (25)	Chris Bosh (10)	LeBron James (13)	Wells Fargo Center; 19,523	1–1

November : 12–2 (home: 7–1; road: 5–1)

Game	Date	Team	Score	High points	High rebounds	High assists	Location Attendance	Record
3	November 1	@ Brooklyn	L 100–101	LeBron James (26)	LeBron James (7)	LeBron James (6)	Barclays Center; 17,732	1–2
4	November 3	Washington	W 103–93	LeBron James (25)	Chris Bosh (7)	Mario Chalmers (8)	American Airlines Arena; 19,600	2–2
5	November 5	@ Toronto	W 104–95	LeBron James (35)	LeBron James (8)	LeBron James (8)	Air Canada Centre; 18,470	3–2
6	November 7	L.A. Clippers	W 102–97	Dwyane Wade (29)	Chris Bosh (6)	Dwyane Wade (7)	American Airlines Arena; 19,600	4–2
7	November 9	Boston	L 110–111	LeBron James (25)	LeBron James (8)	LeBron James (10)	American Airlines Arena; 19,710	4–3
8	November 12	Milwaukee	W 118–95	LeBron James (33)	Wade & Andersen (7)	Mario Chalmers (7)	American Airlines Arena; 19,600	5–3
9	November 15	Dallas	W 110–104	LeBron James (39)	Chris Andersen (7)	Dwyane Wade (8)	American Airlines Arena; 19,772	6–3
10	November 16	@ Charlotte	W 97–81	LeBron James (30)	Rashard Lewis (9)	LeBron James (7)	Time Warner Cable Arena; 19,084	7–3
11	November 19	Atlanta	W 104–88	Chris Bosh (19)	LeBron James (6)	Norris Cole (9)	American Airlines Arena; 19,600	8–3
12	November 20	@ Orlando	W 120–92	LeBron James (21)	Michael Beasley (7)	Mario Chalmers (8)	Amway Center; 17,256	9–3
13	November 23	Orlando	W 101–99	Dwyane Wade (27)	LeBron James (9)	LeBron James (7)	American Airlines Arena; 19,647	10–3
14	November 25	Phoenix	W 107–92	LeBron James (35)	Chris Andersen (7)	Dwyane Wade (12)	American Airlines Arena; 15,758	11–3
15	November 27	@ Cleveland	W 95–84	LeBron James (28)	Michael Beasley (9)	LeBron James (8)	Quicken Loans Arena; 20,562	12–3
16	November 29	@ Toronto	W 90–83	LeBron James (27)	Dwyane Wade (7)	Mario Chalmers (8)	Air Canada Centre; 18,290	13–3

December : 11–4 (home: 6–1; road: 5–3)

Game	Date	Team	Score	High points	High rebounds	High assists	Location Attendance	Record
17	December 1	Charlotte	W 99–98	LeBron James (26)	Chris Bosh (9)	Mario Chalmers (6)	American Airlines Arena; 19,617	14–3
18	December 3	Detroit	L 97–107	James & Beasley (23)	Bosh & Lewis (6)	James & Chalmers (6)	American Airlines Arena; 19,741	14–4
19	December 5	@ Chicago	L 87–107	LeBron James (21)	Michael Beasley (7)	Norris Cole (6)	United Center; 22,125	14–5
20	December 7	@ Minnesota	W 103–82	LeBron James (21)	LeBron James (14)	LeBron James (8)	Target Center; 19,888	15–5
21	December 8	@ Detroit	W 110–95	LeBron James (24)	Chris Bosh (9)	LeBron James (9)	Palace of Auburn Hills; 18,034	16–5
22	December 10	@ Indiana	L 84–90	James & Wade (17)	LeBron James (14)	James & Wade (6)	Bankers Life Fieldhouse; 18,165	16–6
23	December 14	Cleveland	W 114–107	LeBron James (25)	Chris Bosh (12)	LeBron James (9)	American Airlines Arena; 19,656	17–6
24	December 16	Utah	W 117–94	LeBron James (30)	LeBron James (9)	LeBron James (9)	American Airlines Arena; 19,600	18–6
25	December 18	Indiana	W 97–94	Dwyane Wade (32)	LeBron James (9)	LeBron James (7)	American Airlines Arena; 19,898	19–6
26	December 20	Sacramento	W 122–103	Chris Bosh (25)	Chris Bosh (8)	LeBron James (8)	American Airlines Arena; 19,600	20–6
27	December 23	Atlanta	W 121–119 (OT)	LeBron James (38)	Chris Andersen (9)	LeBron James (6)	American Airlines Arena; 20,204	21–6
28	December 25	@ L.A. Lakers	W 101–95	Bosh & Wade (23)	Chris Bosh (11)	Wade & Chalmers (7)	Staples Center; 18,997	22–6
29	December 27	@ Sacramento	L 103–108 (OT)	LeBron James (33)	LeBron James (8)	Mario Chalmers (10)	Sleep Train Arena; 17,317	22–7
30	December 28	@ Portland	W 108–107	Chris Bosh (37)	Chris Bosh (10)	Mario Chalmers (9)	Moda Center; 20,071	23–7
31	December 30	@ Denver	W 97–94	LeBron James (26)	Ray Allen (7)	LeBron James (10)	Pepsi Center; 19,155	24–7

January : 8–6 (home: 5–2; road: 3–4)

Game	Date	Team	Score	High points	High rebounds	High assists	Location Attendance	Record
32	January 2	Golden State	L 114–123	LeBron James (26)	Mario Chalmers (7)	James & Wade (5)	American Airlines Arena; 20,350	24–8
33	January 4	@ Orlando	W 110–94	Bosh & Wade (20)	LeBron James (8)	LeBron James (8)	Amway Center; 18,846	25–8
34	January 5	Toronto	W 102–97	LeBron James (30)	Chris Bosh (11)	LeBron James (5)	American Airlines Arena; 20,020	26–8
35	January 7	New Orleans	W 107–88	LeBron James (32)	Chris Bosh (9)	Dwyane Wade (8)	American Airlines Arena; 20,097	27–8
36	January 9	@ New York	L 92–102	LeBron James (32)	Chris Bosh (9)	LeBron James (6)	Madison Square Garden; 19,812	27–9
37	January 10	@ Brooklyn	L 95–104 (2OT)	LeBron James (36)	Chris Bosh (10)	Norris Cole (7)	Barclays Center; 17,732	27–10
38	January 15	@ Washington	L 97–114	Chris Bosh (26)	LeBron James (8)	James & Cole (7)	Verizon Center; 20,356	27–11
39	January 17	@ Philadelphia	W 101–86	Chris Bosh (25)	LeBron James (8)	LeBron James (10)	Wells Fargo Center; 19,286	28–11
40	January 18	@ Charlotte	W 104–96 (OT)	LeBron James (34)	Udonis Haslem (10)	LeBron James (6)	Time Warner Cable Arena; 19,631	29–11
41	January 20	@ Atlanta	L 114–121	LeBron James (30)	Bosh & Allen (7)	Norris Cole (8)	Philips Arena; 19,262	29–12
42	January 21	Boston	W 93–86	LeBron James (29)	LeBron James (8)	Chalmers & Cole (6)	American Airlines Arena; 19,619	30–12
43	January 23	L.A. Lakers	W 109–102	Chris Bosh (31)	LeBron James (13)	LeBron James (6)	American Airlines Arena; 19,608	31–12
44	January 26	San Antonio	W 113–101	Chris Bosh (24)	LeBron James (7)	Mario Chalmers (7)	American Airlines Arena; 19,683	32–12
45	January 29	Oklahoma City	L 95–112	LeBron James (34)	Chris Bosh (9)	Mario Chalmers (8)	American Airlines Arena; 19,673	32–13

February : 9–1 (home: 3–0; road: 6–1)

Game	Date	Team	Score	High points	High rebounds	High assists	Location Attendance	Record
46	February 1	@ New York	W 106–91	LeBron James (30)	Chris Bosh (10)	LeBron James (7)	Madison Square Garden; 19,812	33–13
47	February 3	Detroit	W 102–96	Dwyane Wade (30)	Dwyane Wade (10)	LeBron James (11)	American Airlines Arena; 19,802	34–13
48	February 5	@ L.A. Clippers	W 116–112	LeBron James (31)	James & Bosh (8)	LeBron James (12)	Staples Center; 19,672	35–13
49	February 8	@ Utah	L 89–94	Dwyane Wade (19)	James & Bosh (7)	Mario Chalmers (7)	EnergySolutions Arena; 19,911	35–14
50	February 11	@ Phoenix	W 103–97	LeBron James (37)	LeBron James (9)	James, Cole & Allen (3)	US Airways Center; 17,927	36–14
51	February 12	@ Golden State	W 111–110	LeBron James (36)	LeBron James (13)	LeBron James (9)	Oracle Arena; 19,596	37–14
All-Star Break
52	February 18	@ Dallas	W 117–106	LeBron James (42)	LeBron James (9)	Mario Chalmers (9)	American Airlines Center; 20,461	38–14
53	February 20	@ Oklahoma City	W 103–81	LeBron James (33)	Dwyane Wade (10)	Bosh & Andersen (8)	Chesapeake Energy Arena; 18,203	39–14
54	February 23	Chicago	W 93–79	Chris Bosh (28)	Bosh & Wade (10)	Mario Chalmers (9)	American Airlines Arena; 19,848	40–14
55	February 27	New York	W 108–82	LeBron James (31)	Bosh & Andersen (7)	Shane Battier (5)	American Airlines Arena; 19,634	41–14

March : 10–8 (home: 7–2; road: 3–6)

Game	Date	Team	Score	High points	High rebounds	High assists	Location Attendance	Record
56	March 1	Orlando	W 112–98	Dwyane Wade (24)	LeBron James (9)	LeBron James (7)	American Airlines Arena; 19,834	42–14
57	March 3	Charlotte	W 124–107	LeBron James (61)	James & Bosh (7)	Mario Chalmers (7)	American Airlines Arena; 19,727	43–14
58	March 4	@ Houston	L 103–106	Wade & Beasley (24)	Chris Andersen (7)	James & Wade (6)	Toyota Center; 18,523	43–15
59	March 6	@ San Antonio	L 87–111	Chris Bosh (24)	LeBron James (8)	James & Wade (7)	AT&T Center; 18,581	43–16
60	March 9	@ Chicago	L 88–95 (OT)	Dwyane Wade (25)	Chris Andersen (13)	LeBron James (8)	United Center; 22,028	43–17
61	March 10	Washington	W 99–90	LeBron James (23)	James & Bosh (7)	LeBron James (8)	American Airlines Arena; 19,657	44–17
62	March 12	Brooklyn	L 95–96	Chris Bosh (24)	Mario Chalmers (9)	LeBron James (7)	American Airlines Arena; 19,616	44–18
63	March 14	Denver	L 107–111	Ray Allen (22)	Chris Bosh (8)	James, Chalmers & Wade (6)	American Airlines Arena; 19,600	44–19
64	March 16	Houston	W 113–104	Ray Allen (25)	Chris Bosh (8)	Dwyane Wade (7)	American Airlines Arena; 19,666	45–19
65	March 18	@ Cleveland	W 100–96	LeBron James (43)	Chris Andersen (8)	Mario Chalmers (9)	Quicken Loans Arena; 20,562	46–19
66	March 19	@ Boston	L 96–101	Dwyane Wade (17)	Chris Bosh (11)	Mario Chalmers (11)	TD Garden; 18,624	46–20
67	March 21	Memphis	W 91–86	Ray Allen (18)	LeBron James (6)	LeBron James (7)	American Airlines Arena; 20,007	47–20
68	March 22	@ New Orleans	L 95–105	LeBron James (25)	LeBron James (8)	LeBron James (9)	Smoothie King Center; 18,185	47–21
69	March 24	Portland	W 93–91	LeBron James (32)	Chris Andersen (11)	LeBron James (5)	American Airlines Arena; 20,030	48–21
70	March 26	@ Indiana	L 83–84	LeBron James (38)	LeBron James (8)	LeBron James (5)	Bankers Life Fieldhouse; 18,165	48–22
71	March 28	@ Detroit	W 110–78	James & Haslem (17)	LeBron James (10)	LeBron James (12)	Palace of Auburn Hills; 21,231	49–22
72	March 29	@ Milwaukee	W 88–67	Chris Bosh (14)	Chris Andersen (14)	Douglas & Cole (4)	BMO Harris Bradley Center; 17,986	50–22
73	March 31	Toronto	W 93–83	LeBron James (32)	James & Andersen (7)	LeBron James (8)	American Airlines Arena; 19,831	51–22

April : 3–6 (home: 3–3; road: 0–3)

Game	Date	Team	Score	High points	High rebounds	High assists	Location Attendance	Record
74	April 2	Milwaukee	W 96–77	LeBron James (17)	Douglas & Andersen (7)	LeBron James (8)	American Airlines Arena; 19,609	52–22
75	April 4	Minnesota	L 121–122 (2OT)	LeBron James (34)	Chris Bosh (9)	Mario Chalmers (6)	American Airlines Arena; 19,661	52–23
76	April 6	New York	W 102–91	LeBron James (38)	Udonis Haslem (11)	LeBron James (6)	American Airlines Arena; 19,647	53–23
77	April 8	Brooklyn	L 87–88	LeBron James (29)	LeBron James (10)	LeBron James (6)	American Airlines Arena; 19,600	53–24
78	April 9	@ Memphis	L 102–107	LeBron James (37)	James & Bosh (6)	James, Douglas & Cole (5)	FedExForum; 18,119	53–25
79	April 11	Indiana	W 98–86	LeBron James (36)	Udonis Haslem (9)	Mario Chalmers (5)	American Airlines Arena; 20,300	54–25
80	April 12	@ Atlanta	L 85–98	LeBron James (27)	Haslem & James (8)	LeBron James (5)	Philips Arena; 19,287	54–26
81	April 14	@ Washington	L 93–114	Michael Beasley (18)	Udonis Haslem (8)	Norris Cole (7)	Verizon Center; 20,356	54–27
82	April 16	Philadelphia	L 87–100	Dwyane Wade (16)	Udonis Haslem (10)	Douglas & Wade (4)	American Airlines Arena; 20,350	54–28

2013–14 season schedule

== Playoffs ==
=== Game log ===
2014 playoff game log
Total: 13–7 (home: 8–2; road: 5–5)
First Round: 4–0 (home: 2–0; road: 2–0)

Game	Date	Team	Score	High points	High rebounds	High assists	Location Attendance	Series
1	April 20	Charlotte	W 99–88	LeBron James (27)	Chris Andersen (10)	Dwyane Wade (5)	American Airlines Arena; 19,640	1–0
2	April 23	Charlotte	W 101–97	LeBron James (32)	James & Wade (6)	LeBron James (8)	American Airlines Arena; 19,603	2–0
3	April 26	@ Charlotte	W 98–85	LeBron James (30)	LeBron James (10)	James & Wade (6)	Time Warner Cable Arena; 19,633	3–0
4	April 28	@ Charlotte	W 109–98	LeBron James (31)	Chris Bosh (8)	LeBron James (9)	Time Warner Cable Arena; 19,092	4–0

Conference Semifinals: 4–1 (home: 3–0; road: 1–1)

Game	Date	Team	Score	High points	High rebounds	High assists	Location Attendance	Series
1	May 6	Brooklyn	W 107–86	LeBron James (22)	Chris Bosh (11)	Dwyane Wade (5)	American Airlines Arena; 19,470	1–0
2	May 8	Brooklyn	W 94–82	LeBron James (22)	Ray Allen (8)	Dwyane Wade (7)	American Airlines Arena; 19,639	2–0
3	May 10	@ Brooklyn	L 90–104	LeBron James (28)	LeBron James (8)	LeBron James (5)	Barclays Center; 17,732	2–1
4	May 12	@ Brooklyn	W 102–96	LeBron James (49)	Ray Allen (7)	Mario Chalmers (7)	Barclays Center; 17,732	3–1
5	May 14	Brooklyn	W 96–94	LeBron James (29)	LeBron James (9)	Mario Chalmers (7)	American Airlines Arena; 19,615	4–1

Conference Finals: 4–2 (home: 3–0; road: 1–2)

Game	Date	Team	Score	High points	High rebounds	High assists	Location Attendance	Series
1	May 18	@ Indiana	L 96–107	Dwyane Wade (27)	LeBron James (10)	James & Chalmers (5)	Bankers Life Fieldhouse; 18,165	0–1
2	May 20	@ Indiana	W 87–83	Dwyane Wade (23)	Chris Andersen (12)	LeBron James (6)	Bankers Life Fieldhouse; 18,165	1–1
3	May 24	Indiana	W 99–87	LeBron James (26)	Chris Andersen (7)	LeBron James (7)	American Airlines Arena; 20,025	2–1
4	May 26	Indiana	W 102–90	LeBron James (32)	LeBron James (10)	LeBron James (5)	American Airlines Arena; 19,874	3–1
5	May 28	@ Indiana	L 90–93	Chris Bosh (20)	Chris Bosh (10)	Dwyane Wade (7)	Bankers Life Fieldhouse; 18,165	3–2
6	May 30	Indiana	W 117–92	Bosh & James (25)	Chris Andersen (10)	Wade & James (6)	American Airlines Arena; 20,021	4–2

NBA Finals: 1–4 (home: 0–2; road: 1–2)

Game	Date	Team	Score	High points	High rebounds	High assists	Location Attendance	Series
1	June 5	@ San Antonio	L 95–110	LeBron James (25)	Chris Bosh (9)	Norris Cole (5)	AT&T Center; 18,581	0–1
2	June 8	@ San Antonio	W 98–96	LeBron James (35)	LeBron James (10)	Chalmers & Wade (4)	AT&T Center; 18,581	1–1
3	June 10	San Antonio	L 92–111	James & Wade (22)	James & Andersen (5)	LeBron James (7)	American Airlines Arena; 19,900	1–2
4	June 12	San Antonio	L 86–107	LeBron James (28)	LeBron James (8)	Mario Chalmers (5)	American Airlines Arena; 19,900	1–3
5	June 15	@ San Antonio	L 87–104	LeBron James (31)	LeBron James (10)	LeBron James (5)	AT&T Center; 18,581	1–4

2014 playoff schedule

== Player statistics ==
=== Regular season ===
Player	POS	GP	GS	MP	REB	AST	STL	BLK	PTS	MPG	RPG	APG	SPG	BPG	PPG
Norris Cole	PG	82	6	2,014	160	248	77	5	527	24.6	2.0	3.0	.9	.1	6.4
Chris Bosh	C	79	79	2,531	522	87	80	78	1,281	32.0	6.6	1.1	1.0	1.0	16.2
LeBron James	PF	77	77	2,902	533	488	121	26	2,089	37.7	6.9	6.3	1.6	.3	27.1
Mario Chalmers	PG	73	73	2,178	214	357	119	16	716	29.8	2.9	4.9	1.6	.2	9.8
Shane Battier	SF	73	56	1,468	138	63	50	39	298	20.1	1.9	.9	.7	.5	4.1
Ray Allen	SG	73	9	1,936	205	143	54	8	701	26.5	2.8	2.0	.7	.1	9.6
Chris Andersen	C	72	0	1,396	379	19	32	97	477	19.4	5.3	.3	.4	1.3	6.6
Rashard Lewis	SF	60	6	971	110	57	53	8	268	16.2	1.8	1.0	.9	.1	4.5
Michael Beasley	SF	55	2	831	172	42	23	21	436	15.1	3.1	.8	.4	.4	7.9
Dwyane Wade	SG	54	53	1,775	241	252	79	29	1,028	32.9	4.5	4.7	1.5	.5	19.0
Udonis Haslem	PF	46	18	653	175	13	11	15	173	14.2	3.8	.3	.2	.3	3.8
Toney Douglas^{†}	PG	27	17	410	61	49	13	3	114	15.2	2.3	1.8	.5	.1	4.2
Roger Mason Jr.	SG	25	2	260	22	19	6	1	74	10.4	.9	.8	.2	.0	3.0
Greg Oden	C	23	6	212	54	1	7	13	67	9.2	2.3	.0	.3	.6	2.9
James Jones	SF	20	6	236	23	9	3	4	97	11.8	1.2	.5	.2	.2	4.9
Joel Anthony^{†}	C	12	0	37	7	0	0	4	6	3.1	.6	.0	.0	.3	.5
Justin Hamilton^{†}	C	7	0	68	7	0	4	0	26	9.7	1.0	.0	.6	.0	3.7
DeAndre Liggins	SG	1	0	1	1	0	0	0	2	1.0	1.0	.0	.0	.0	2.0

- ^{†} Denotes player spent time with another team in the season. Stats reflect time with the Heat only.

=== Playoffs ===
Player	POS	GP	GS	MP	REB	AST	STL	BLK	PTS	MPG	RPG	APG	SPG	BPG	PPG
LeBron James	PF	20	20	763	141	95	36	11	548	38.2	7.1	4.8	1.8	.6	27.4
Dwyane Wade	SG	20	20	693	77	77	30	5	356	34.7	3.9	3.9	1.5	.3	17.8
Chris Bosh	C	20	20	686	112	21	17	20	298	34.3	5.6	1.1	.9	1.0	14.9
Mario Chalmers	PG	20	19	535	46	72	19	6	128	26.8	2.3	3.6	1.0	.3	6.4
Ray Allen	SG	20	1	527	67	32	14	4	185	26.4	3.4	1.6	.7	.2	9.3
Norris Cole	PG	20	0	404	22	36	9	1	92	20.2	1.1	1.8	.5	.1	4.6
Rashard Lewis	SF	18	8	319	37	5	7	6	95	17.7	2.1	.3	.4	.3	5.3
Chris Andersen	C	18	0	317	107	5	5	18	92	17.6	5.9	.3	.3	1.0	5.1
Shane Battier	SF	16	6	202	10	5	5	1	37	12.6	.6	.3	.3	.1	2.3
Udonis Haslem	PF	16	6	169	41	4	1	3	40	10.6	2.6	.3	.1	.2	2.5
James Jones	SF	15	0	126	11	5	3	2	53	8.4	.7	.3	.2	.1	3.5
Toney Douglas	PG	10	0	29	4	5	0	0	10	2.9	.4	.5	.0	.0	1.0
Michael Beasley	SF	4	0	23	4	2	0	0	11	5.8	1.0	.5	.0	.0	2.8
Greg Oden	C	3	0	7	1	1	1	0	0	2.3	.3	.3	.3	.0	.0
