= 2013–14 Indiana Pacers season =

NBA professional basketball team season

- Division champions
- Head coach: Frank Vogel
- General manager: Larry Bird
- Owners: Herb Simon
- Arena: Bankers Life Fieldhouse

Results
- Record: 56–26 (.683)
- Place: Division: 1st (Central); Conference: 1st (Eastern)
- Playoff finish: Eastern Conference Finals (lost to Heat 2–4)
- Stats at Basketball Reference

Local media
- Television: Fox Sports Indiana
- Radio: WFNI

The 2013–14 Indiana Pacers season was 47th season of the franchise and 38th season in the National Basketball Association (NBA). The Pacers marked their best start in franchise history, 16–1.

The Pacers finished the regular season with a win-loss record of 56–26, their best since 2004. It consisted of a home record of 36–5, their best since 2000, and a road record of 21–20. At the end of the season, they were in first place of the division for the second consecutive season and the Eastern Conference for the first time since 2004.

In the playoffs, the Pacers defeated the Atlanta Hawks in seven games in the First Round in a rematch of last season's First Round in which Indiana won in six games, and the Washington Wizards in six games in the Semi-finals to advance to the conference finals for the second straight year. They were again ultimately stopped by the two-time defending NBA champion Miami Heat in six games, making it the third straight year that the Pacers had their playoff run ended by the Heat. Miami would go on to lose to a rejuvenated San Antonio Spurs team in a five-game NBA Finals series, ending their chances to three-peat. The Pacers did not return to the Conference Finals until 2024.

== Key dates ==
- June 27 – The 2013 NBA draft in New York City.
- July 1 – The free agency period began.
- July 7–12 – The Pacers took part in the 2013 NBA Summer League in Orlando, Florida.
- September 28 – The Pacers began their annual training camp at their practice facility.
- October 5 – The Pacers opened their preseason schedule with an 82–76 loss to the Chicago Bulls.
- October 30 – The Pacers won their regular season opening game at home 97–87 against the Orlando Magic.
- November 22 – The Pacers began their season 11–1, the best season start in franchise history.
- January 24 – Paul George selected as All-Star Game starter.
- January 30 – Roy Hibbert selected as All-Star Reserve.
- February 1 – The Pacers sign Andrew Bynum for rest of the season.
- February 14–16 – The 2014 NBA All-Star Weekend will take place in New Orleans.
- February 20 – Pacers trade Danny Granger to Philadelphia 76ers for Evan Turner and Lavoy Allen
- February 20 – Trade deadline at 3:00 p.m. ET.

== 2013 NBA draft ==
Round	Pick	Player	Position	Nationality	School/club team
1	23	Solomon Hill	Small/Power Forward	United States	Arizona (Sr.)
2	53	Colton Iverson*	Center	United States	Colorado State (Sr.)

* The Pacers traded the draft rights of Iverson to the Boston Celtics for cash.

== Roster ==
2013–14 Indiana Pacers roster
Players

Pos.	No.	Player	Height	Weight	DOB	From
F/C	5	Lavoy Allen	6 ft 9 in (2.06 m)	255 lb (116 kg)	1989–02–04	Temple
G/F	8	Rasual Butler	6 ft 7 in (2.01 m)	215 lb (98 kg)	1979–05–23	La Salle
C	17	Andrew Bynum	7 ft 0 in (2.13 m)	285 lb (129 kg)	1987–10–27	St. Joseph HS (NJ)
F	22	Chris Copeland	6 ft 8 in (2.03 m)	235 lb (107 kg)	1984–03–17	Colorado
G/F	24	Paul George	6 ft 9 in (2.06 m)	220 lb (100 kg)	1990–05–02	Fresno State
C	55	Roy Hibbert	7 ft 2 in (2.18 m)	290 lb (132 kg)	1986–12–11	Georgetown
G	3	George Hill	6 ft 3 in (1.91 m)	188 lb (85 kg)	1986–05–04	IUPUI
F	9	Solomon Hill	6 ft 7 in (2.01 m)	225 lb (102 kg)	1991–03–18	Arizona
C	28	Ian Mahinmi	6 ft 11 in (2.11 m)	250 lb (113 kg)	1986–11–05	France
F	4	Luis Scola	6 ft 9 in (2.06 m)	240 lb (109 kg)	1980–04–30	Argentina
G	15	Donald Sloan	6 ft 3 in (1.91 m)	205 lb (93 kg)	1988–01–15	Texas A&M
G	1	Lance Stephenson	6 ft 5 in (1.96 m)	230 lb (104 kg)	1990–09–05	Cincinnati
G/F	12	Evan Turner	6 ft 7 in (2.01 m)	220 lb (100 kg)	1988–10–27	Ohio State
G	32	C. J. Watson	6 ft 2 in (1.88 m)	175 lb (79 kg)	1984–04–17	Tennessee
F	21	David West	6 ft 9 in (2.06 m)	250 lb (113 kg)	1980–08–29	Xavier

Coaches
Head coach
- Frank Vogel
Assistant(s)
- Nate McMillan
- Dan Burke
- Popeye Jones

Legend
- (DP) Unsigned draft pick
- (FA) Free agent
- (S) Suspended
- (DL) On assignment to D-League affiliate
- Injured

Roster
Updated: 2014–02–20

== Pre-season ==
2013 pre-season game log
Total: 3–5 (home: 0–3; road: 3–2)
Pre-season: 3–5 (home: 0–3; road: 3–2)

Game	Date	Team	Score	High points	High rebounds	High assists	Location Attendance	Record
1	October 5	Chicago	L 76–82	West & George (14)	Roy Hibbert (9)	George Hill (6)	Bankers Life Fieldhouse; 15,273	0–1
2	October 10	Houston	L 96–116	Paul George (17)	Roy Hibbert (8)	George Hill (5)	Mall of Asia Arena; 12,885	0–2
3	October 13	@ Houston	L 98–107	Paul George (19)	Danny Granger (9)	George Hill (4)	Taipei Arena; 13,686	0–3
4	October 16	Dallas	L 85–92	Scola & Johnson (14)	Hilton Armstrong (8)	Donald Sloan (4)	Bankers Life Fieldhouse; 12,735	0–4
5	October 18	@ Chicago	L 98–103	Paul George (22)	Hill & Stephenson (7)	Lance Stephenson (8)	United Center; 21,783	0–5
6	October 19	@ Cleveland	W 102–79	David West (20)	Paul George (6)	George & S. Hill (4)	Quicken Loans Arena; 14,760	1–5
7	October 22	@ Atlanta	W 107–89	David West (24)	David West (7)	Lance Stephenson (8)	Philips Arena; 8,263	2–5
8	October 25	@ Dallas	W 98–77	Paul George (28)	Hibbert & Mahinmi (8)	Paul George (6)	American Airlines Center; 19,107	3–5

2013–14 season schedule

== Regular season ==
=== Game log ===
2013–14 game log
Total: 56–26 (home: 35–6; road: 21–20)
October: 2–0 (home: 1–0; road: 1–0)

Game	Date	Team	Score	High points	High rebounds	High assists	Location Attendance	Record
1	October 29	Orlando	W 97–87	Paul George (24)	Roy Hibbert (16)	George, Stephenson (5)	Bankers Life Fieldhouse – 18,165	1–0
2	October 30	@ New Orleans	W 95–90	Paul George (32)	Lance Stephenson (8)	George, West (5)	New Orleans Arena – 17,803	2–0

November: 13–1 (home: 8–0; road: 5–1)

Game	Date	Team	Score	High points	High rebounds	High assists	Location Attendance	Record
3	November 2	Cleveland	W 89–74	Lance Stephenson (22)	Paul George (13)	C. J. Watson (6)	Bankers Life Fieldhouse – 16,242	3–0
4	November 5	@ Detroit	W 99–91	Paul George (31)	George, Hibbert (10)	Lance Stephenson (7)	Palace of Auburn Hills – 13,401	4–0
5	November 6	Chicago	W 97–80	Paul George (21)	David West (13)	Stephenson, Watson, Sloan (4)	Bankers Life Fieldhouse – 18,165	5–0
6	November 8	Toronto	W 91–84	Paul George (23)	Paul George (8)	Paul George (6)	Bankers Life Fieldhouse – 13,316	6–0
7	November 9	@ Brooklyn	W 96–91	Paul George (24)	Roy Hibbert (11)	Stephenson, Hill (7)	Barclays Center – 17,732	7–0
8	November 11	Memphis	W 95–79	Paul George (23)	Lance Stephenson (11)	Lance Stephenson (12)	Bankers Life Fieldhouse – 13,130	8–0
9	November 15	Milwaukee	W 104–77	Roy Hibbert (24)	Roy Hibbert (10)	George Hill (5)	Bankers Life Fieldhouse – 16,202	9–0
10	November 16	@ Chicago	L 94–110	Roy Hibbert (14)	Roy Hibbert (10)	George Hill (5)	United Center – 22,158	9–1
11	November 20	@ New York	W 103–96 (OT)	Paul George (35)	David West (10)	Lance Stephenson (5)	Madison Square Garden – 19,812	10–1
12	November 22	@ Boston	W 97–82	Paul George (27)	Lance Stephenson (11)	Lance Stephenson (10)	TD Garden – 18,624	11–1
13	November 23	Philadelphia	W 106–98	Roy Hibbert (27)	Roy Hibbert (13)	David West (6)	Bankers Life Fieldhouse – 18,165	12–1
14	November 25	Minnesota	W 98–84	George, Hill (26)	George, Stephenson, Scola (8)	George Hill (7)	Bankers Life Fieldhouse – 16,426	13–1
15	November 27	@ Charlotte	W 99–74	C. J. Watson (18)	Hibbert, Stephenson (10)	George, Hill (4)	Time Warner Cable Arena – 15,170	14–1
16	November 29	Washington	W 93–73	Paul George (23)	Lance Stephenson (11)	Lance Stephenson (10)	Bankers Life Fieldhouse – 18,165	15–1

December: 10–4 (home: 6–1; road: 4–3)

Game	Date	Team	Score	High points	High rebounds	High assists	Location Attendance	Record
17	December 1	@ L.A. Clippers	W 105–100	Paul George (27)	David West (12)	Hill, Stephenson (6)	Staples Center – 19,060	16–1
18	December 2	@ Portland	L 102–106	Paul George (43)	Roy Hibbert (14)	George Hill (11)	Moda Center – 19,023	16–2
19	December 4	@ Utah	W 95–86	Paul George (19)	Roy Hibbert (9)	David West (8)	EnergySolutions Arena – 15,519	17–2
20	December 7	@ San Antonio	W 111–100	Paul George (28)	Hibbert, Scola (10)	Paul George (6)	AT&T Center – 18,581	18–2
21	December 8	@ Oklahoma City	L 94–118	Paul George (32)	Roy Hibbert (9)	West, Stephenson (3)	Chesapeake Energy Arena – 18,203	18–3
22	December 10	Miami	W 90–84	Roy Hibbert (24)	David West (9)	George Hill (6)	Bankers Life Fieldhouse – 18,165	19–3
23	December 13	Charlotte	W 99–94	Lance Stephenson (20)	Hibbert, Stephenson (11)	Lance Stephenson (7)	Bankers Life Fieldhouse – 18,165	20–3
24	December 16	Detroit	L 96–101	Lance Stephenson (23)	Paul George (9)	Lance Stephenson (6)	Bankers Life Fieldhouse – 15,443	20–4
25	December 18	@ Miami	L 94–97	Paul George (25)	Lance Stephenson (9)	Paul George (6)	American Airlines Arena – 19,898	20–5
26	December 20	Houston	W 114–81	Paul George (24)	Paul George (9)	Lance Stephenson (6)	Bankers Life Fieldhouse – 18,165	21–5
27	December 22	Boston	W 106–79	Paul George (24)	Roy Hibbert (12)	Lance Stephenson (10)	Bankers Life Fieldhouse – 18,165	22–5
28	December 23	@ Brooklyn	W 103–86	George, Stephenson (26)	Hibbert, Scola (9)	George, Stephenson (5)	Barclays Center – 17,732	23–5
29	December 28	Brooklyn	W 105–91	Paul George (24)	Lance Stephenson (9)	Lance Stephenson (7)	Bankers Life Fieldhouse – 18,165	24–5
30	December 31	Cleveland	W 91–76	Paul George (21)	Luis Scola (9)	Lance Stephenson (8)	Bankers Life Fieldhouse – 18,165	25–5

January: 10–5 (home: 6–1; road: 4–4)

Game	Date	Team	Score	High points	High rebounds	High assists	Location Attendance	Record
31	January 1	@ Toronto	L 82–95	Roy Hibbert (16)	Paul George (8)	Lance Stephenson (4)	Air Canada Centre – 18,271	25–6
32	January 4	New Orleans	W 99–82	Paul George (24)	Paul George (10)	West, George (5)	Bankers Life Fieldhouse – 18,165	26–6
33	January 5	@ Cleveland	W 82–78	Paul George (16)	Luis Scola (8)	Paul George (6)	Quicken Loans Arena – 17,502	27–6
34	January 7	Toronto	W 86–79	Roy Hibbert (22)	David West (12)	Lance Stephenson (8)	Bankers Life Fieldhouse – 16,147	28–6
35	January 8	@ Atlanta	L 87–97	Paul George (28)	Paul George (12)	six players (3)	Philips Arena – 15,169	28–7
36	January 10	Washington	W 93–66	David West (20)	Paul George (14)	Paul George (6)	Bankers Life Fieldhouse – 18,165	29–7
37	January 14	Sacramento	W 116–92	Paul George (31)	David West (8)	Lance Stephenson (5)	Bankers Life Fieldhouse – 17,530	30–7
38	January 16	New York	W 117–89	Lance Stephenson (28)	Paul George, Luis Scola (7)	George Hill (5)	Bankers Life Fieldhouse – 18,165	31–7
39	January 18	L.A. Clippers	W 106–92	Paul George (36)	Lance Stephenson (12)	Lance Stephenson (7)	Bankers Life Fieldhouse – 18,165	32–7
40	January 20	@ Golden State	W 102–94	Paul George (23)	Roy Hibbert (13)	Lance Stephenson (7)	Oracle Arena – 19,596	33–7
41	January 22	@ Phoenix	L 100–124	Paul George (26)	Paul George (7)	Lance Stephenson (4)	US Airways Center – 16,465	33–8
42	January 24	@ Sacramento	W 116–111 (OT)	Paul George (36)	Roy Hibbert (11)	George Hill (8)	Sleep Train Arena – 17,317	34–8
43	January 25	@ Denver	L 96–109	Lance Stephenson (23)	Paul George (11)	Lance Stephenson (7)	Pepsi Center – 19,155	34–9
44	January 28	@ L.A. Lakers	W 104–92	David West (19)	Lance Stephenson (14)	Lance Stephenson, Paul George (6)	Staples Center – 18,997	35–9
45	January 30	Phoenix	L 94–102	Roy Hibbert (26)	Paul George (12)	Lance Stephenson (10)	Bankers Life Fieldhouse – 16,541	35–10

February: 9–3 (home: 7–1; road: 2–2)

Game	Date	Team	Score	High points	High rebounds	High assists	Location Attendance	Record
46	February 1	Brooklyn	W 97–96	Paul George, Roy Hibbert (20)	Paul George (8)	David West (7)	Bankers Life Fieldhouse – 18,165	36–10
47	February 3	Orlando	W 98–79	Danny Granger (16)	Lance Stephenson (12)	Lance Stephenson (5)	Bankers Life Fieldhouse – 16,266	37–10
48	February 4	@ Atlanta	W 89–85	David West (22)	David West (10)	George Hill (7)	Philips Arena – 15,374	38–10
49	February 7	Portland	W 118–113 (OT)	George Hill (37)	David West (10)	George Hill (8)	Bankers Life Fieldhouse – 18,165	39–10
50	February 9	@ Orlando	L 92–93	Paul George (27)	Lance Stephenson (9)	George Hill (7)	Amway Center – 16,366	39–11
51	February 10	Denver	W 119–80	David West (25)	Roy Hibbert (12)	George Hill (5)	Bankers Life Fieldhouse – 16,124	40–11
52	February 12	Dallas	L 73–81	George Hill (14)	Lance Stephenson (10)	David West (6)	Bankers Life Fieldhouse – 17,663	40–12
All-Star Break
53	February 18	Atlanta	W 108–98	Paul George (26)	David West (6)	Lance Stephenson, George Hill (7)	Bankers Life Fieldhouse – 18,165	41–12
54	February 19	@ Minnesota	L 91–104	Paul George (35)	Paul George (11)	Lance Stephenson (4)	Target Center – 15,109	41–13
55	February 22	@ Milwaukee	W 110–100	Paul George (32)	Lance Stephenson (9)	Lance Stephenson (8)	BMO Harris Bradley Center – 17,165	42–13
56	February 25	L.A. Lakers	W 118–98	Paul George (20)	David West (12)	Paul George (6)	Bankers Life Fieldhouse – 18,165	43–13
57	February 27	Milwaukee	W 101–96	Roy Hibbert (24)	Roy Hibbert (12)	Paul George (6)	Bankers Life Fieldhouse – 17,892	44–13

March : 8–10 (home: 5–2; road: 3–8)

Game	Date	Team	Score	High points	High rebounds	High assists	Location Attendance	Record
58	March 1	@ Boston	W 102–97	Paul George (25)	Lance Stephenson (9)	Lance Stephenson (6)	TD Garden; 18,624	45–13
59	March 2	Utah	W 94–91	David West (25)	Lance Stephenson (8)	Stephenson & Watson (5)	Bankers Life Fieldhouse; 18,165	46–13
60	March 4	Golden State	L 96–98	David West (27)	Paul George (12)	Paul George (4)	Bankers Life Fieldhouse; 18,165	46–14
61	March 5	@ Charlotte	L 87–109	Evan Turner (22)	Lance Stephenson (8)	Evan Turner (5)	Time Warner Cable Arena; 15,372	46–15
62	March 7	@ Houston	L 86–112	David West (15)	David West (10)	Lance Stephenson (6)	Toyota Center; 18,332	46–16
63	March 9	@ Dallas	L 94–105	Paul George (27)	Paul George (11)	West, Stephenson, Hill & Turner (3)	American Airlines Center; 20,361	46–17
64	March 11	Boston	W 94–83	David West (24)	Andrew Bynum (10)	George, Hill & Sloan (4)	Bankers Life Fieldhouse; 18,165	47–17
65	March 14	@ Philadelphia	W 101–94	Paul George (25)	Lance Stephenson (12)	George Hill (9)	Wells Fargo Center; 14,754	48–17
66	March 15	@ Detroit	W 112–104 (OT)	Paul George (30)	Bynum & Stephenson (9)	Paul George (7)	Palace of Auburn Hills; 17,440	49–17
67	March 17	Philadelphia	W 99–90	Lance Stephenson (25)	David West (12)	David West, George Hill (3)	Bankers Life Fieldhouse; 18,165	50–17
68	March 19	@ New York	L 86–92	Lance Stephenson (21)	Lance Stephenson (9)	George Hill (4)	Madison Square Garden; 19,812	50–18
69	March 21	Chicago	W 91–79	Luis Scola (19)	Paul George (12)	Paul George (10)	Bankers Life Fieldhouse; 18,165	51–18
70	March 22	@ Memphis	L 71–82	Lance Stephenson (15)	Lance Stephenson (8)	George Hill (5)	FedExForum; 18,119	51–19
71	March 24	@ Chicago	L 77–89	Paul George (21)	Lance Stephenson (10)	Hill & West (4)	United Center; 21,803	51–20
72	March 26	Miami	W 84–83	Paul George (23)	David West (9)	David West (5)	Bankers Life Fieldhouse; 18,165	52–20
73	March 28	@ Washington	L 78–91	Paul George (19)	Lance Stephenson (14)	George Hill (5)	Verizon Center; 19,708	52–21
74	March 30	@ Cleveland	L 76–90	Paul George (15)	George, Stephenson & Hill (7)	George Hill (6)	Quicken Loans Arena; 17,147	52–22
75	March 31	San Antonio	L 77–103	Paul George (16)	David West (8)	Paul George (5)	Bankers Life Fieldhouse; 18,165	52–23

April : 4–3 (home: 2–1; road: 2–2)

Game	Date	Team	Score	High points	High rebounds	High assists	Location Attendance	Record
76	April 2	Detroit	W 101–94	Paul George (27)	Paul George (13)	Paul George (7)	Bankers Life Fieldhouse; 18,165	53–23
77	April 4	@ Toronto	L 94–102	Paul George (26)	David West (7)	George Hill (5)	Air Canada Centre; 19,800	53–24
78	April 6	Atlanta	L 88–107	Paul George (18)	George & Hill (7)	David West (6)	Bankers Life Fieldhouse; 18,165	53–25
79	April 9	@ Milwaukee	W 104–102	Luis Scola (24)	Luis Scola (9)	Evan Turner (9)	BMO Harris Bradley Center; 13,139	54–25
80	April 11	@ Miami	L 86–98	Paul George (22)	David West (8)	Paul George (5)	American Airlines Arena; 20,300	54–26
81	April 13	Oklahoma City	W 102–97	David West (21)	Paul George (12)	Lance Stephenson (11)	Bankers Life Fieldhouse; 18,165	55–26
82	April 16	@ Orlando	W 101–86	Rasual Butler & Chris Copeland (19)	Lavoy Allen (11)	Evan Turner (6)	Amway Center; 18,846	56–26

2013–14 season schedule

== Playoffs ==
=== Game log ===
2014 playoff game log
Total: 10–9 (home: 5–5; road: 5–4)
First Round: 4–3 (home: 2–2; road: 2–1)

Game	Date	Team	Score	High points	High rebounds	High assists	Location Attendance	Series
1	April 19	Atlanta	L 93–101	Paul George (25)	Paul George (10)	Paul George (5)	Bankers Life Fieldhouse; 18,165	0–1
2	April 22	Atlanta	W 101–85	Paul George (27)	Paul George (10)	George & West (6)	Bankers Life Fieldhouse; 18,165	1–1
3	April 24	@ Atlanta	L 85–98	Lance Stephenson (21)	Paul George (14)	David West (5)	Philips Arena; 18,124	1–2
4	April 26	@ Atlanta	W 91–88	Paul George (24)	Paul George (10)	George & Hill (5)	Philips Arena; 19,043	2–2
5	April 28	Atlanta	L 97–107	Paul George (26)	Paul George (12)	David West (7)	Bankers Life Fieldhouse; 18,165	2–3
6	May 1	@ Atlanta	W 95–88	George & West (24)	David West (11)	David West (6)	Philips Arena; 19,044	3–3
7	May 3	Atlanta	W 92–80	Paul George (30)	Lance Stephenson (14)	Lance Stephenson (5)	Bankers Life Fieldhouse; 18,165	4–3

Conference Semifinals: 4–2 (home: 1–2; road: 3–0)

Game	Date	Team	Score	High points	High rebounds	High assists	Location Attendance	Series
1	May 5	Washington	L 96–102	George & Hill (18)	David West (12)	Paul George (5)	Bankers Life Fieldhouse; 18,165	0–1
2	May 7	Washington	W 86–82	Roy Hibbert (28)	Roy Hibbert (9)	Lance Stephenson (5)	Bankers Life Fieldhouse; 18,165	1–1
3	May 9	@ Washington	W 85–63	Paul George (23)	Paul George (8)	Hill & Stephenson (5)	Verizon Center; 20,356	2–1
4	May 11	@ Washington	W 95–92	Paul George (39)	Paul George (12)	David West (8)	Verizon Center; 20,356	3–1
5	May 13	Washington	L 79–102	David West (17)	David West (6)	Turner, Stephenson, Hibbert & West (3)	Bankers Life Fieldhouse; 18,165	3–2
6	May 15	@ Washington	W 93–80	David West (29)	Roy Hibbert (7)	Lance Stephenson (8)	Verizon Center; 19,502	4–2

Conference Finals: 2–4 (home: 2–1; road: 0–3)

Game	Date	Team	Score	High points	High rebounds	High assists	Location Attendance	Series
1	May 18	Miami	W 107–96	Paul George (24)	Roy Hibbert (9)	Lance Stephenson (8)	Bankers Life Fieldhouse; 18,165	1–0
2	May 20	Miami	L 83–87	Lance Stephenson (25)	Roy Hibbert (13)	Lance Stephenson (7)	Bankers Life Fieldhouse; 18,165	1–1
3	May 24	@ Miami	L 87–99	Paul George (17)	Lance Stephenson (11)	Lance Stephenson (5)	American Airlines Arena; 20,025	1–2
4	May 26	@ Miami	L 90–109	Paul George (23)	David West (12)	West, Stephenson & Hill (4)	American Airlines Arena; 19,874	1–3
5	May 28	Miami	W 93–90	Paul George (37)	Roy Hibbert (13)	Lance Stephenson (5)	Bankers Life Fieldhouse; 18,165	2–3
6	May 30	@ Miami	L 92–117	Paul George (29)	Paul George (8)	Hibbert, Hill & Sloan (3)	American Airlines Arena; 20,021	2–4

2014 playoff schedule

=== Standings ===
Central Division	W	L	PCT	GB	Home	Road	Div	GP
c-Indiana Pacers	56	26	.683	–	35‍–‍6	21‍–‍20	12–4	82
x-Chicago Bulls	48	34	.585	8.0	27‍–‍14	21‍–‍20	11–5	82
Cleveland Cavaliers	33	49	.402	23.0	19‍–‍22	14‍–‍27	7–9	82
Detroit Pistons	29	53	.354	27.0	17‍–‍24	12‍–‍29	6–10	82
Milwaukee Bucks	15	67	.183	41.0	10‍–‍31	5‍–‍36	4–12	82

Eastern Conference
#	Team	W	L	PCT	GB	GP
1	c-Indiana Pacers *	56	26	.683	–	82
2	y-Miami Heat *	54	28	.659	2.0	82
3	y-Toronto Raptors *	48	34	.585	8.0	82
4	x-Chicago Bulls	48	34	.585	8.0	82
5	x-Washington Wizards	44	38	.537	12.0	82
6	x-Brooklyn Nets	44	38	.537	12.0	82
7	x-Charlotte Bobcats	43	39	.524	13.0	82
8	x-Atlanta Hawks	38	44	.463	18.0	82
9	New York Knicks	37	45	.451	19.0	82
10	Cleveland Cavaliers	33	49	.402	23.0	82
11	Detroit Pistons	29	53	.354	27.0	82
12	Boston Celtics	25	57	.305	31.0	82
13	Orlando Magic	23	59	.280	33.0	82
14	Philadelphia 76ers	19	63	.232	37.0	82
15	Milwaukee Bucks	15	67	.183	41.0	82

== Player statistics ==
=== Regular season ===
Player	POS	GP	GS	MP	REB	AST	STL	BLK	PTS	MPG	RPG	APG	SPG	BPG	PPG
Luis Scola	PF	82	2	1,399	391	81	26	16	626	17.1	4.8	1.0	.3	.2	7.6
Roy Hibbert	C	81	81	2,409	538	91	29	182	871	29.7	6.6	1.1	.4	2.2	10.8
Paul George	SF	80	80	2,898	542	283	151	22	1,737	36.2	6.8	3.5	1.9	.3	21.7
David West	PF	80	80	2,472	542	223	61	74	1,118	30.9	6.8	2.8	.8	.9	14.0
Lance Stephenson	SG	78	78	2,752	558	359	54	7	1,080	35.3	7.2	4.6	.7	.1	13.8
Ian Mahinmi	C	77	1	1,248	257	24	41	72	272	16.2	3.3	.3	.5	.9	3.5
George Hill	PG	76	76	2,434	283	265	75	23	781	32.0	3.7	3.5	1.0	.3	10.3
C. J. Watson	PG	63	5	1,193	101	107	60	8	414	18.9	1.6	1.7	1.0	.1	6.6
Rasual Butler	SG	50	2	378	41	17	7	9	136	7.6	.8	.3	.1	.2	2.7
Donald Sloan	SG	48	1	392	44	50	10	1	110	8.2	.9	1.0	.2	.0	2.3
Chris Copeland	SF	41	0	265	32	18	3	7	153	6.5	.8	.4	.1	.2	3.7
Orlando Johnson^{†}	SG	38	0	342	51	16	6	1	91	9.0	1.3	.4	.2	.0	2.4
Danny Granger^{†}	SF	29	2	653	105	33	9	13	242	22.5	3.6	1.1	.3	.4	8.3
Solomon Hill	SF	28	0	226	41	12	5	2	47	8.1	1.5	.4	.2	.1	1.7
Evan Turner^{†}	SF	27	2	571	86	64	11	2	192	21.1	3.2	2.4	.4	.1	7.1
Lavoy Allen^{†}	PF	14	0	112	34	6	2	6	40	8.0	2.4	.4	.1	.4	2.9
Andrew Bynum^{†}	C	2	0	36	19	2	0	1	23	18.0	9.5	1.0	.0	.5	11.5

- ^{†} Denotes player spent time with another team in the season. Stats reflect time with the Pacers only.

=== Playoffs ===
Player	POS	GP	GS	MP	REB	AST	STL	BLK	PTS	MPG	RPG	APG	SPG	BPG	PPG
Paul George	SF	19	19	781	145	73	41	7	429	41.1	7.6	3.8	2.2	.4	22.6
Lance Stephenson	SG	19	19	705	131	80	16	4	259	37.1	6.9	4.2	.8	.2	13.6
David West	PF	19	19	687	128	75	14	15	287	36.2	6.7	3.9	.7	.8	15.1
George Hill	PG	19	19	687	71	57	23	4	230	36.2	3.7	3.0	1.2	.2	12.1
Roy Hibbert	C	19	19	542	105	17	4	26	176	28.5	5.5	.9	.2	1.4	9.3
C. J. Watson	PG	19	0	342	40	18	16	1	107	18.0	2.1	.9	.8	.1	5.6
Ian Mahinmi	C	19	0	241	45	3	5	16	37	12.7	2.4	.2	.3	.8	1.9
Luis Scola	PF	18	0	243	42	9	6	3	110	13.5	2.3	.5	.3	.2	6.1
Evan Turner	SF	12	0	149	26	19	4	0	39	12.4	2.2	1.6	.3	.0	3.3
Chris Copeland	SF	12	0	82	5	1	3	3	36	6.8	.4	.1	.3	.3	3.0
Rasual Butler	SG	11	0	70	6	1	1	1	19	6.4	.5	.1	.1	.1	1.7
Donald Sloan	SG	4	0	15	1	3	1	0	7	3.8	.3	.8	.3	.0	1.8
Lavoy Allen	PF	4	0	15	5	1	0	0	4	3.8	1.3	.3	.0	.0	1.0
Solomon Hill	SF	1	0	1	0	0	0	0	0	1.0	.0	.0	.0	.0	.0
