= Nenê =

Brazilian basketball player (born 1982)

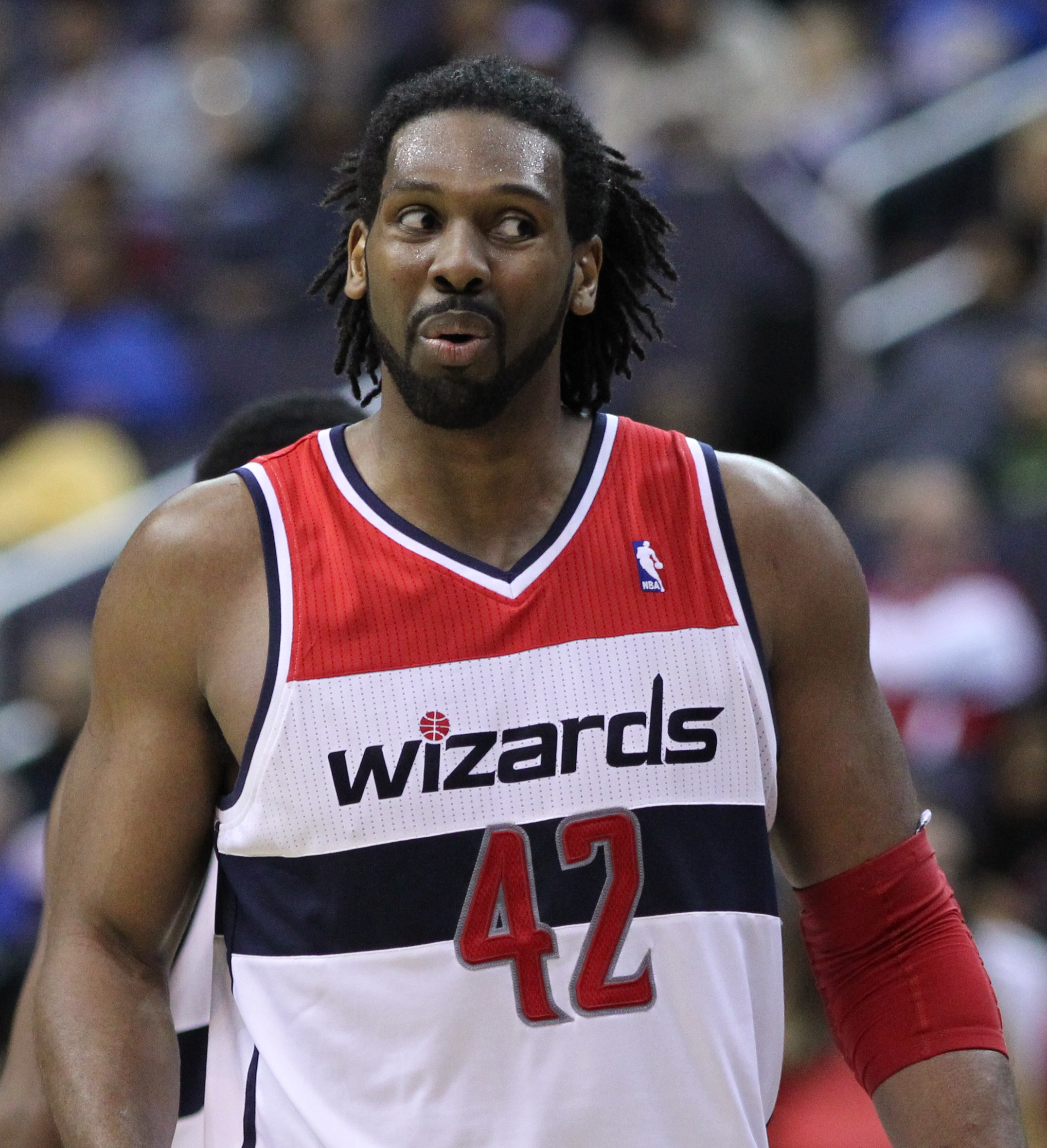
- Nenê with the Washington Wizards in 2012

Personal information
- Born: September 13, 1982 (age 44) São Carlos, Brazil
- Listed height: 6 ft 11 in (2.11 m)
- Listed weight: 250 lb (113 kg)

Career information
- NBA draft: 2002: 1st round, 7th overall pick
- Drafted by: New York Knicks
- Playing career: 1999–2020
- Position: Center / power forward
- Number: 31, 42

Career history
- 1999–2002: Vasco da Gama
- 2002–2012: Denver Nuggets
- 2012–2016: Washington Wizards
- 2016–2020: Houston Rockets

Career highlights
- NBA All-Rookie First Team (2003)

Career NBA statistics
- Points: 10,909 (11.3 ppg)
- Rebounds: 5,828 (6.0 rpg)
- Assists: 1,719 (1.8 apg)
- Stats at NBA.com
- Stats at Basketball Reference
Medals
Men's basketball
Representing Brazil
FIBA AmeriCup
Silver medal – second place	2001 Neuquén
Goodwill Games
Bronze medal – third place	2001 Brisbane

Nenê (Portuguese pronunciation: [neˈne]; born Maybyner Rodney Hilário, September 13, 1982) is a Brazilian former professional basketball player. Known previously as Nenê Hilario, he legally changed his name to simply Nenê in 2003.

== Early life ==
Nenê was born Maybyner Rodney Hilário in São Carlos, Brazil, he was nicknamed "Nenê" (a variation of Brazilian Portuguese for baby) because he was the youngest in both his family and his group of childhood friends. Like most Brazilian children, he played soccer from an early age; due to his skills, he was invited to train with pro clubs. In the mid-1990s, he started playing basketball at Escola de Basquete Meneghelli in his hometown. He later played professionally for Vasco da Gama from 1999 to 2002. In 2001, he joined the Brazilian national team and participated in the Goodwill Games.

== Professional career ==
=== Denver Nuggets (2002–2012) ===
Nenê's successful three-year stint playing in Brazil earned him an NBA pre-draft camp invitation in Chicago in 2002. He was later selected with the seventh overall pick in the 2002 NBA draft by the New York Knicks, who traded him to the Denver Nuggets. He was the first Brazilian ever to be selected in the first round of the NBA draft.

Nenê began the 2002–03 season as a bench player, but ended it as a starter, averaging 10.5 points, 6.1 rebounds and 1.6 steals. He ranked sixth in the NBA in field goal percentage (.519) and 20th in steals. He subsequently earned NBA All-Rookie first team honors.

In his second season, Nenê played and started in 77 games, averaging 11.8 points, 6.5 rebounds and 1.5 steals in 32.5 minutes per games. He ranked fourth in the NBA in field goal percentage (.530).

In his third season, Nenê missed 27 games – 13 games due to a sprained medial collateral ligament in his left knee, two games due to a right hip contusion, eight games due to a strained left hamstring, and four games due to an NBA suspension stemming from an on-court altercation with Minnesota Timberwolves center Michael Olowokandi. He consequently played 55 games in 2004–05, averaging 9.6 points and 5.9 rebounds in 23.9 minutes per game.

In 2005–06, Nenê missed 81 games after suffering a torn ACL in his right knee after just three minutes of action against the San Antonio Spurs in the Denver's season opening game on November 1.

After re-signing with the Nuggets to a six-year, $60 million contract on July 20, 2006, Nenê returned to action in 2006–07, averaging 12.2 points and 7.0 rebounds in 64 games (42 starts).

In 2007–08, Nenê played in just 16 games, averaging 5.3 points and 5.4 rebounds in 16.6 minutes per game. He suffered a torn ulner collateral ligament in his left thumb against the Boston Celtics on November 7 and missed the next 22 games.

On January 11, 2008, Nenê released a statement saying that he was taking an indefinite leave of absence from the Denver Nuggets to address a medical issue. Three days later, he had a malignant testicular tumor removed at a Denver hospital. His right testicle was removed as well. He returned to action on March 27, 2008, in the Nuggets' 118–105 home win over the Dallas Mavericks. Nenê entered the game with 1:17 left in the fourth quarter to a standing ovation.

Nenê missed 37 games between January 11 and March 24, 2008, after his bout with testicular cancer. A right groin strain also forced him to miss the final six games of the season.

In response to his poor run of injuries and missed time, Nenê had a career-best year in 2008–09. He appeared in 77 games (76 starts) and averaged career-highs of 14.6 points, 7.8 rebounds and 1.31 blocks, in addition to 1.23 steals in 32.6 minutes per game. He subsequently finished fifth in voting for the 2008–09 NBA Most Improved Player award. He also ranked second in the NBA in field goal percentage (.604 – 428-of-709), the 2nd best single-season mark in Nuggets' franchise history.

In 2009–10, Nenê played and started all 82 games for the first time in his career and averaged 13.8 points, 7.6 rebounds, a career-high 2.5 assists, 1.4 steals and 1.0 blocks in a career-high 33.6 minutes per game.

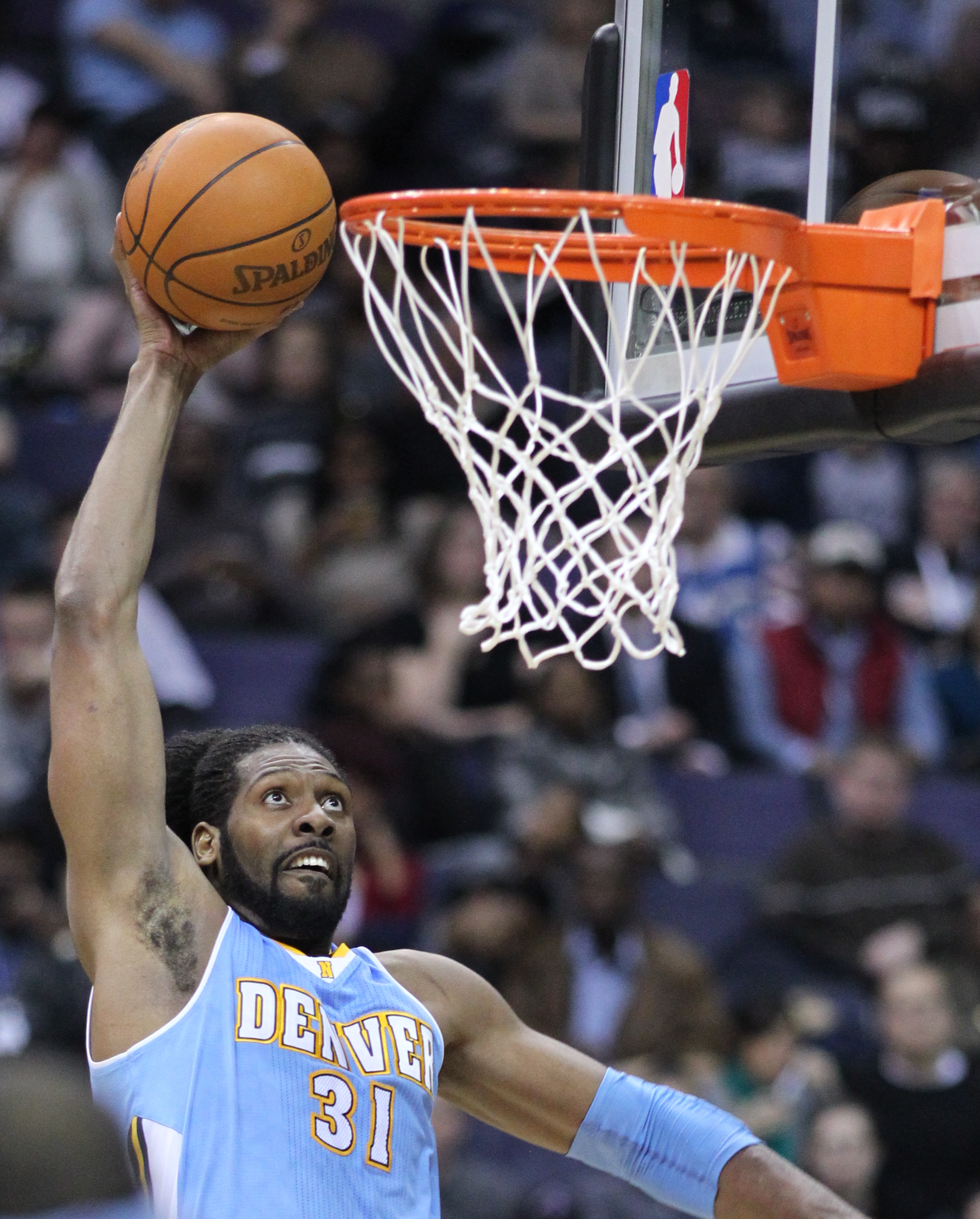
Nenê dunks the ball while playing for the Denver Nuggets in January 2011.

In 2010–11, Nenê appeared in 75 games (starting all 75), averaging 14.5 points, 7.6 rebounds, 2.0 assists, and 1.12 steals while shooting an NBA-leading .615 from the field in 30.5 minutes per game.

On December 14, 2011, Nenê re-signed with the Nuggets to a five-year, $67 million contract.

=== Washington Wizards (2012–2016) ===
On March 15, 2012, Nenê was traded to the Washington Wizards in a three-way trade involving the Nuggets and the Los Angeles Clippers. He averaged 13.7 points and 7.5 rebounds in 39 total games (33 starts) with Washington and Denver during the lockout-shortened 2011–12 season.

In 2012–13, Nenê averaged 12.6 points, 6.7 rebounds and 2.9 assists in 27.2 minutes per game in 61 games (49 starts). On January 21, 2013, he scored a season-high 24 points in a 98–95 win over the Portland Trail Blazers.

On November 26, 2013, Nenê scored a career-high 30 points in a 116–111 win over the Los Angeles Lakers. Later that season, on February 22, Nenê matched that career-high in a 94–93 win over the New Orleans Pelicans.

In 2014–15, various injuries and ailments limited Nenê's ability to produce at an optimum level, though he appeared in the most games (67) in five years. Towards the end of the season, when Nenê was relegated to more a supporting role to Marcin Gortat, he was a better rebounder and did more of the dirty work required. He averaged 11.0 points and 5.1 rebounds on 51.1% shooting during the season.

Nenê appeared in 12 of team's first 13 games to begin the 2015–16 season, but between November 28 and January 3, he missed 19 straight games with a strained left calf. On March 14, 2016, he scored a season-high 20 points off the bench in a 124–81 win over the Detroit Pistons, Washington's largest victory since the 2002–03 season.

=== Houston Rockets (2016–2020) ===
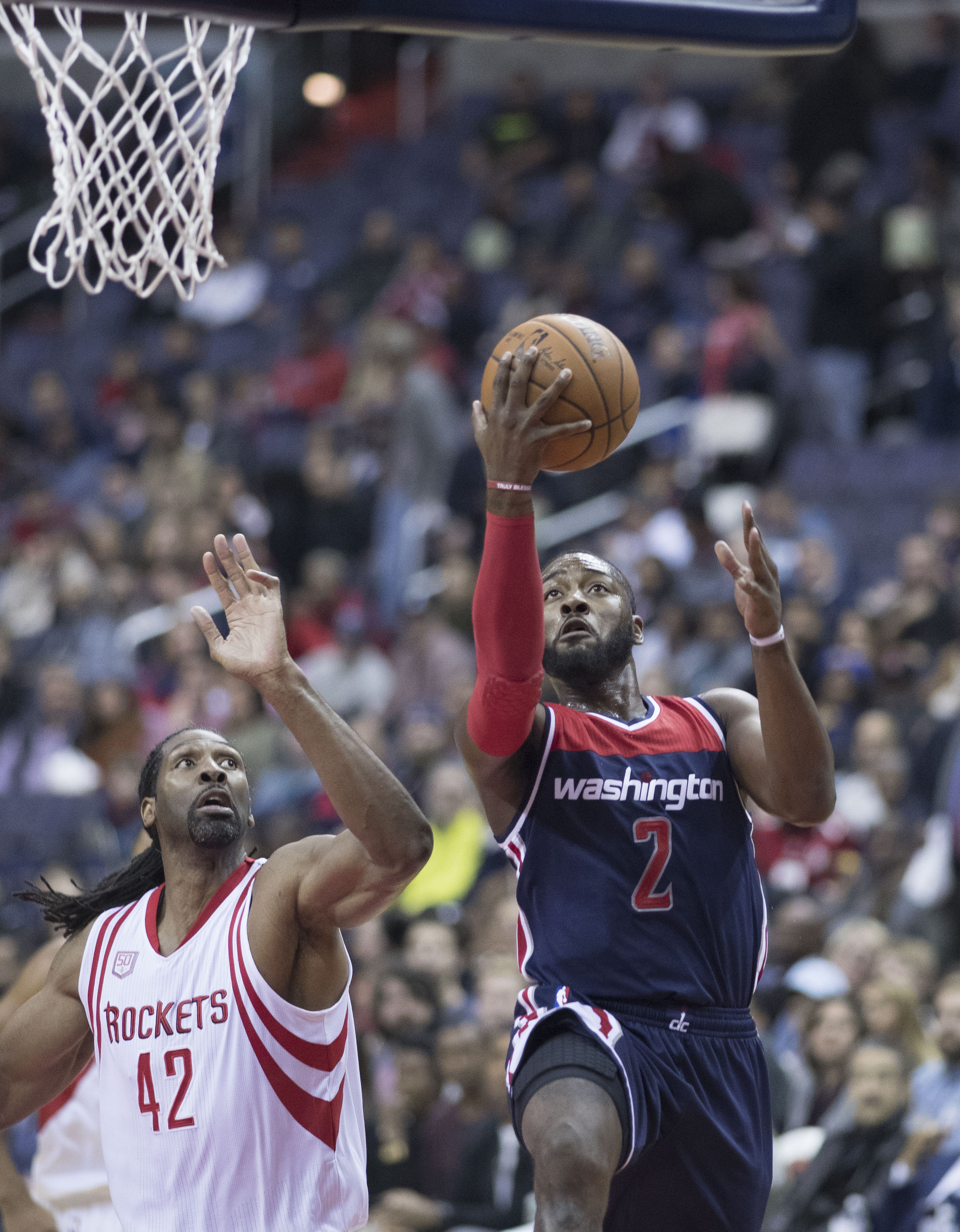
Nenê watches John Wall of the Washington Wizards attempt a lay-up in 2016

On July 20, 2016, Nenê signed with the Houston Rockets. He made his debut for the Rockets in their season opener on October 26, 2016, scoring seven points off the bench in a 120–114 loss to the Los Angeles Lakers. On January 5, 2017, he scored a season-high 18 points for his 12th double-digit game of the season in a 118–116 win over the Oklahoma City Thunder. On April 23, 2017, he scored a playoff career-high 28 points on a perfect 12-of-12 shooting from the field to help the Rockets go up 3–1 in the team's first-round playoff series against the Oklahoma City Thunder. On May 8, 2017, Nenê was ruled out for the remainder of the postseason with a left adductor tear. He suffered the injury the previous day in Game 4 of the Rockets' second-round playoff series against the San Antonio Spurs.

On July 6, 2017, Nenê re-signed with the Rockets. On December 16, 2017, he scored a season-high 16 points in a 115–111 win over the Milwaukee Bucks.

Nenê missed the first 21 games of the 2018–19 season with a strained right calf. Nenê's final NBA game was Game 6 of the 2019 Western Conference Semifinals against the Golden State Warriors on May 10, 2019. In his final game, Nenê recorded 2 points, 2 rebounds, 1 assist and 1 block. He declined his $3.8 million player option, thus making him a free agent.

On September 3, 2019, Nenê re-signed with the Rockets. Most of his 2019-20 salary was non-guaranteed in the form of a likely bonus. The NBA suspected cap circumvention and ruled that Nenê's salary value in a trade would only be the guaranteed $2.6 million and not the full value of $10 million.

Due to a lingering hip injury, Nenê was unable to play in a single game for the Rockets in 2019–20. On February 5, 2020, Nenê was traded to the Atlanta Hawks in a four-team, 12-player trade. The following day, Nenê was waived by the Hawks.

== National team career ==
Nenê has been a member of the senior Brazilian national basketball team. With Brazil, he played at the following major tournaments: the 2001 FIBA AmeriCup, the 2003 FIBA AmeriCup, the 2007 FIBA AmeriCup, the 2012 Summer Olympics, the 2014 FIBA World Cup, and the 2016 Summer Olympics. He won the silver medal at the 2001 FIBA AmeriCup.

== Personal life ==
On January 14, 2008, Nenê had a malignant testicular tumor removed. His right testicle was removed as well. In the years after his cancer scare, Nenê, a Christian, said God used cancer to test him and prepare him for helping others. Upon retiring from basketball, Nenê plans to become involved with church activities in Brazil.

Nenê has three sons with ex-wife Lauren Prothe. He is currently married to Briley Sheppard Hilario.

== NBA career statistics ==
Legend
GP	Games played	GS	Games started	MPG	Minutes per game
FG%	Field goal percentage	3P%	3-point field goal percentage	FT%	Free throw percentage
RPG	Rebounds per game	APG	Assists per game	SPG	Steals per game
BPG	Blocks per game	PPG	Points per game	**Bold**	Career high
*	Led the league

=== Regular season ===
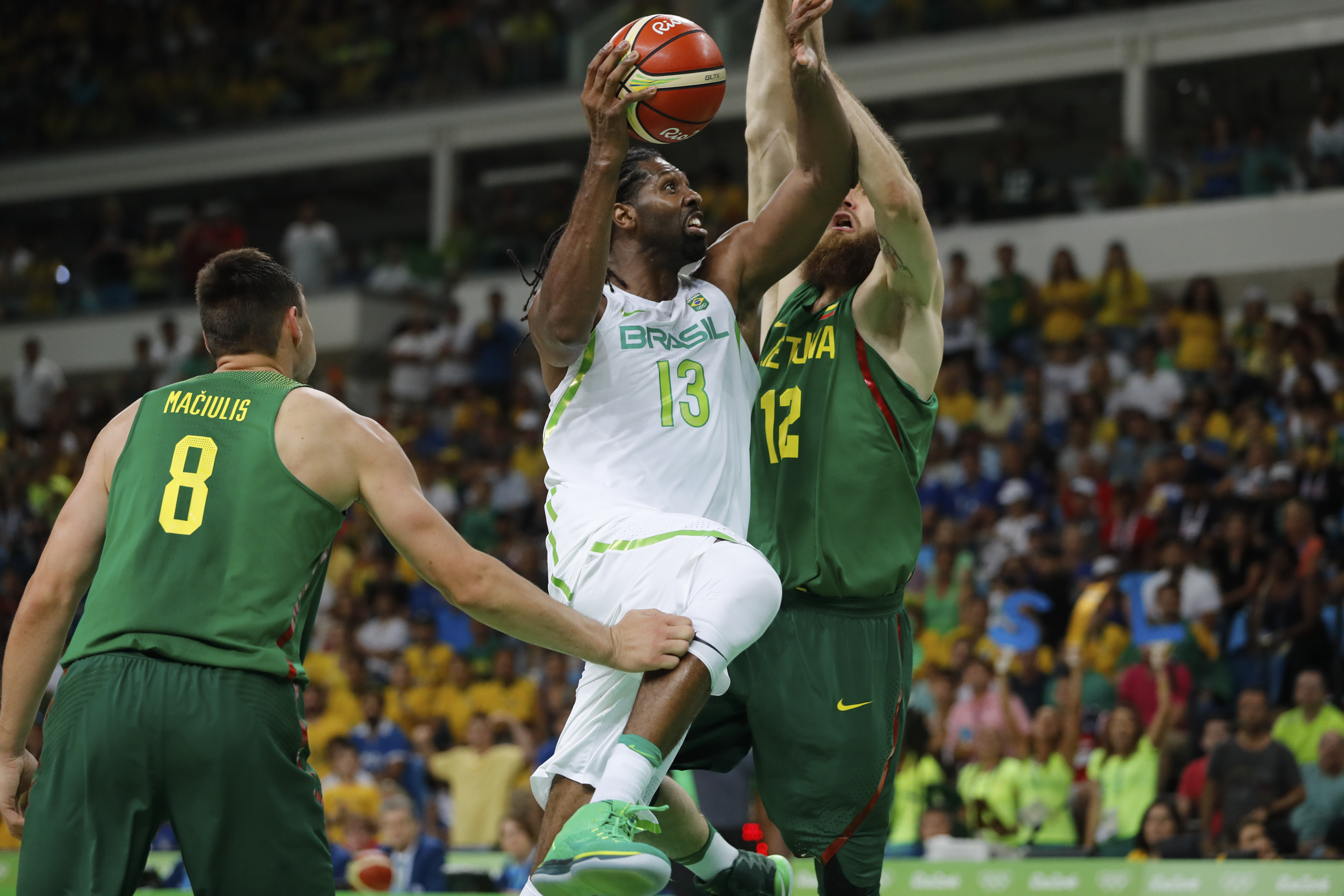
Nenê with the Brazil men's national basketball team in 2016.

Year	Team	GP	GS	MPG	FG%	3P%	FT%	RPG	APG	SPG	BPG	PPG
2002–03	Denver	80	53	28.2	.519	.000	.578	6.1	1.9	**1.6**	.8	10.5
2003–04	Denver	77	77	32.5	.530	.000	.682	6.5	2.2	1.5	.5	11.8
2004–05	Denver	55	18	23.9	.503	.000	.660	5.9	1.5	.9	.9	9.6
2005–06	Denver	1	0	3.0	.000	—	—	.0	.0	.0	.0	.0
2006–07	Denver	64	42	26.8	.570	.000	.689	7.0	1.2	1.0	.9	12.2
2007–08	Denver	16	1	16.6	.408	.000	.551	5.4	.9	.6	.9	5.3
2008–09	Denver	77	76	32.6	.604	.200	.723	**7.8**	1.4	1.2	**1.3**	**14.6**
2009–10	Denver	**82***	**82***	**33.6**	.587	.000	.704	7.6	2.5	1.4	1.0	13.8
2010–11	Denver	75	75	30.5	.615*	.200	.711	7.6	2.0	1.1	1.0	14.5
2011–12	Denver	28	27	29.5	.509	.000	.677	7.4	2.2	1.3	.9	13.4
2011–12	Washington	11	6	25.8	.607	.000	.657	7.5	1.7	.5	1.2	14.5
2012–13	Washington	61	49	27.2	.480	.000	**.729**	6.7	**2.9**	.9	.6	12.6
2013–14	Washington	53	37	29.4	.503	.200	.583	5.5	**2.9**	1.2	.9	14.2
2014–15	Washington	67	58	25.3	.511	.200	.604	5.1	1.8	1.0	.3	11.0
2015–16	Washington	57	11	19.2	.544	.000	.578	4.5	1.7	.9	.5	9.2
2016–17	Houston	67	8	17.9	**.617**	**.333**	.589	4.2	1.0	.8	.6	9.1
2017–18	Houston	52	4	14.6	.569	.000	.636	3.4	0.9	.5	.3	6.5
2018–19	Houston	42	2	13.0	.517	.000	.660	2.9	0.6	.4	.4	3.6
Career		965	626	26.2	.548	.132	.660	6.0	1.8	1.1	.7	11.3

=== Playoffs ===
Year	Team	GP	GS	MPG	FG%	3P%	FT%	RPG	APG	SPG	BPG	PPG
2004	Denver	5	5	26.4	.444	—	.538	5.0	**3.0**	1.0	.6	11.2
2005	Denver	5	0	20.2	.429	—	.652	5.0	.4	.4	.4	6.6
2007	Denver	5	5	**35.8**	.585	—	.778	7.8	2.4	.6	.6	**15.2**
2008	Denver	3	0	10.0	.556	—	**1.000**	2.3	.3	.7	.3	4.3
2009	Denver	**16**	**16**	32.8	.548	—	.657	7.5	2.6	**1.3**	.6	11.5
2010	Denver	5	5	33.8	.621	—	.583	5.8	2.2	1.2	.2	11.4
2011	Denver	5	5	32.4	.478	—	.563	**9.0**	1.6	1.0	.8	14.2
2014	Washington	10	10	32.5	.464	—	.346	5.3	2.6	.9	**1.1**	13.7
2015	Washington	10	10	25.7	.447	—	.478	6.6	1.5	.9	.3	7.9
2017	Houston	9	0	17.9	.706	.000	.581	4.7	.6	.7	.4	10.0
2018	Houston	11	0	9.7	.600	—	.636	2.5	.5	.2	.5	2.8
2019	Houston	7	0	7.6	**1.000**	—	.778	2.0	0.4	0.4	0.3	3.9
Career		91	56	24.2	.530	.000	.595	5.4	1.6	.8	.5	9.2

== See also ==
- List of NBA career field goal percentage leaders
