= 2013–14 Washington Wizards season =

NBA professional basketball team season

- Head coach: Randy Wittman
- General manager: Ernie Grunfeld
- Owners: Monumental Sports & Entertainment
- Arena: Verizon Center

Results
- Record: 44–38 (.537)
- Place: Division: 2nd (Southeast); Conference: 5th (Eastern)
- Playoff finish: Conference Semifinals (lost to Pacers 2–4)
- Stats at Basketball Reference

Local media
- Television: CSN Mid-Atlantic; The CW Washington; TBD TV
- Radio: 106.7 The Fan

The 2013–14 Washington Wizards season is the 53rd season of the franchise in the National Basketball Association (NBA), and the 41st in the Washington, D.C. area. Having a record of 44–38, their best record since the 2004-05 NBA season, including a 22-19 road record, their best since the 1996-97 NBA season as the Washington Bullets, the Wizards clinched playoff berth for the first time since the 2007-08 NBA season. The team beat the Chicago Bulls in the first round of the 2014 NBA playoffs. It was only the third time a Wizards team advanced past the opening round since losing the 1979 NBA Finals. However, they lost to the Indiana Pacers in six games in the Eastern Conference semifinals.

== Key dates ==
- June 27: The 2013 NBA draft took place in Newark, New Jersey.
- July 1: The free agency period begun.

== Draft picks ==
Round	Pick	Player	Position	Nationality	College
1	3	Otto Porter	SF	United States	Georgetown
2	35	Glen Rice Jr.	SG	United States	Rio Grande Valley Vipers (D-League)

== Roster ==
2013–14 Washington Wizards roster
Players

Pos.	No.	Player	Height	Weight	DOB	From
SF	1	Trevor Ariza	6 ft 8 in (2.03 m)	210 lb (95 kg)	1985-06-30	UCLA
SG	3	Bradley Beal	6 ft 3 in (1.91 m)	207 lb (94 kg)	1993-06-28	Florida
PF	35	Trevor Booker	6 ft 8 in (2.03 m)	240 lb (109 kg)	1987-11-25	Clemson
C	90	Drew Gooden	6 ft 10 in (2.08 m)	250 lb (113 kg)	1981-09-24	Kansas
C	4	Marcin Gortat	6 ft 11 in (2.11 m)	240 lb (109 kg)	1984-02-17	Poland
PF	7	Al Harrington	6 ft 9 in (2.06 m)	245 lb (111 kg)	1980-02-17	St. Patrick (NJ)
SG	24	Andre Miller	6 ft 2 in (1.88 m)	200 lb (91 kg)	1976-03-19	Utah
PF	42	Nenê	6 ft 11 in (2.11 m)	250 lb (113 kg)	1982-09-13	Brazil
SF	22	Otto Porter	6 ft 8 in (2.03 m)	198 lb (90 kg)	1993-06-03	Georgetown
SG	14	Glen Rice (DL)	6 ft 6 in (1.98 m)	206 lb (93 kg)	1991-01-01	Georgia Tech
C	13	Kevin Séraphin	6 ft 9 in (2.06 m)	275 lb (125 kg)	1989-12-07	France
SF	31	Chris Singleton	6 ft 8 in (2.03 m)	230 lb (104 kg)	1989-11-21	Florida State
SG	17	Garrett Temple	6 ft 6 in (1.98 m)	195 lb (88 kg)	1986-05-08	LSU
PG	2	John Wall	6 ft 4 in (1.93 m)	195 lb (88 kg)	1990-09-06	Kentucky
SF	9	Martell Webster	6 ft 7 in (2.01 m)	230 lb (104 kg)	1986-12-04	Seattle Preparatory (WA)

Coaches
Head coach
- Randy Wittman
Assistant(s)
- Don Newman
- Don Zierden
- Sam Cassell
- Pat Sullivan
- Ryan Saunders
- Eric Waters (trainer)

Legend
- (DP) Unsigned draft pick
- (FA) Free agent
- (S) Suspended
- (DL) On assignment to D-League affiliate
- Injured

Roster
Updated: April 5, 2014

== Pre-season ==
2013 pre-season game log
Total: 2–5 (home: 1–3; road: 1–2)
Pre-season: 2–5 (home: 1–3; road: 1–2)

Game	Date	Team	Score	High points	High rebounds	High assists	Location Attendance	Record
1	October 8	Brooklyn	L 106–111 (OT)	Nenê (19)	Jan Veselý (12)	John Wall (8)	Verizon Center; 9,743	0–1
2	October 12	Chicago	L 81–83	Bradley Beal (16)	Jan Veselý (9)	Eric Maynor (8)	HSBC Arena (at Rio de Janeiro, Brazil); 13,635	0–2
3	October 15	Miami	W 100–82	Bradley Beal (29)	Trevor Ariza (9)	John Wall (8)	Verizon Center; 13,678	1–2
4	October 17	New York	L 89–98	Bradley Beal (21)	Trevor Booker (9)	John Wall (8)	Baltimore Arena; 12,376	1–3
5	October 19	@ New Orleans	L 89–93	Bradley Beal (30)	Kevin Seraphin (9)	John Wall (11)	Rupp Arena; 14,980	1–4
6	October 22	@ Detroit	L 96–99	Bradley Beal (17)	Kevin Seraphin (11)	Eric Maynor (5)	Palace of Auburn Hills; 9,219	1–5
7	October 23	@ Cleveland	W 101–82	Bradley Beal (21)	Ariza & Maynor (8)	Trevor Ariza (5)	U.S. Bank Arena; 7,528	2–5

2013–14 season schedule

== Regular season ==
=== Season standings ===
Southeast Division	W	L	PCT	GB	Home	Road	Div	GP
y-Miami Heat	54	28	.659	–	32‍–‍9	22‍–‍19	12–4	82
x-Washington Wizards	44	38	.537	10.0	22‍–‍19	22‍–‍19	10–6	82
x-Charlotte Bobcats	43	39	.524	11.0	25‍–‍16	18‍–‍23	6–10	82
x-Atlanta Hawks	38	44	.463	16.0	24‍–‍17	14‍–‍27	8–8	82
Orlando Magic	23	59	.280	31.0	19‍–‍22	4‍–‍37	4–12	82

Eastern Conference
#	Team	W	L	PCT	GB	GP
1	c-Indiana Pacers *	56	26	.683	–	82
2	y-Miami Heat *	54	28	.659	2.0	82
3	y-Toronto Raptors *	48	34	.585	8.0	82
4	x-Chicago Bulls	48	34	.585	8.0	82
5	x-Washington Wizards	44	38	.537	12.0	82
6	x-Brooklyn Nets	44	38	.537	12.0	82
7	x-Charlotte Bobcats	43	39	.524	13.0	82
8	x-Atlanta Hawks	38	44	.463	18.0	82
9	New York Knicks	37	45	.451	19.0	82
10	Cleveland Cavaliers	33	49	.402	23.0	82
11	Detroit Pistons	29	53	.354	27.0	82
12	Boston Celtics	25	57	.305	31.0	82
13	Orlando Magic	23	59	.280	33.0	82
14	Philadelphia 76ers	19	63	.232	37.0	82
15	Milwaukee Bucks	15	67	.183	41.0	82

=== Game log ===
2013–14 game log
Total: 44–38 (home: 22–19; road: 22–19)
October: 0–1 (home: 0–0; road: 0–1)

Game	Date	Team	Score	High points	High rebounds	High assists	Location Attendance	Record
1	October 31	@ Detroit	L 102–113	Trevor Ariza (28)	Trevor Ariza (10)	John Wall (11)	The Palace of Auburn Hills; 18,891	0–1

November: 8–8 (home: 5–2; road: 3–6)

Game	Date	Team	Score	High points	High rebounds	High assists	Location Attendance	Record
2	November 1	Philadelphia	L 102–109	John Wall (26)	Trevor Ariza (14)	Trevor Ariza; John Wall (6)	Verizon Center; 17,160	0–2
3	November 3	@ Miami	L 93–103	Bradley Beal (19)	Marcin Gortat (11)	John Wall (9)	American Airlines Arena; 19,600	0–3
4	November 6	@ Philadelphia	W 116–102	John Wall (24)	Marcin Gortat (12)	John Wall (9)	Wells Fargo Center; 10,117	1–3
5	November 8	Brooklyn	W 112–108 (OT)	Bradley Beal (29)	Marcin Gortat (12)	John Wall (14)	Verizon Center; 17,215	2–3
6	November 10	@ Oklahoma City	L 105–106 (OT)	Bradley Beal (34)	Marcin Gortat (8)	John Wall (8)	Chesapeake Energy Arena; 18,203	2–4
7	November 12	@ Dallas	L 95–105	Trevor Ariza (27)	Marcin Gortat (12)	John Wall (10)	American Airlines Center; 19,627	2–5
8	November 13	@ San Antonio	L 79–92	Martell Webster (21)	Martell Webster (10)	Marcin Gortat; John Wall (3)	AT&T Center; 18,581	2–6
9	November 16	Cleveland	L 96–103 (OT)	Bradley Beal (28)	Marcin Gortat (11)	John Wall (12)	Verizon Center; 18,038	2–7
10	November 19	Minnesota	W 104–100	Bradley Beal (25)	Martell Webster (9)	John Wall (16)	Verizon Center; 14,804	3–7
11	November 20	@ Cleveland	W 98–91	Bradley Beal (26)	Nenê; Jan Veselý (8)	John Wall (8)	Verizon Center; 16,189	4–7
12	November 22	@ Toronto	L 88–96	John Wall (37)	Nenê (10)	Martell Webster (5)	Air Canada Centre; 16,705	4–8
13	November 23	New York	W 98–89	John Wall (31)	Marcin Gortat (17)	John Wall (7)	Verizon Center; 18,089	5–8
14	November 26	L. A. Lakers	W 116–111	John Wall (31)	Martell Webster (9)	John Wall (9)	Verizon Center; 19,204	6–8
15	November 27	@ Milwaukee	W 100–92 (OT)	Marcin Gortat (25)	Marcin Gortat; Nenê (8)	Martell Webster (7)	Bradley Center; 11,584	7–8
16	November 29	@ Indiana	L 73–93	Marcin Gortat (17)	Martell Webster (10)	John Wall (9)	Conseco Fieldhouse; 18,165	7–9
17	November 30	Atlanta	W 108–101	John Wall (26)	Nenê (12)	John Wall (12)	Verizon Center; 14,280	8–9

December : 6–5 (home: 2–3; road: 4–2)

Game	Date	Team	Score	High points	High rebounds	High assists	Location Attendance	Record
18	December 2	Orlando	W 98–80	Trevor Ariza (24)	Trevor Booker (8)	John Wall (13)	Verizon Center; 12,809	9–9
19	December 6	Milwaukee	L 105–109 (OT)	John Wall (30)	Trevor Ariza (12)	John Wall (8)	Verizon Center; 18,194	9–10
20	December 9	Denver	L 74–75	John Wall (20)	Trevor Booker (12)	John Wall (8)	Verizon Center; 13,293	9–11
21	December 13	@ Atlanta	L 99–101 (OT)	Trevor Booker (24)	Trevor Booker (14)	John Wall (11)	Philips Arena; 11,251	9–12
22	December 14	L. A. Clippers	L 97–113	John Wall (24)	Trevor Booker; Marcin Gortat (7)	John Wall (12)	Verizon Center; 16,509	9–13
23	December 16	@ New York	W 102–101	Martell Webster (30)	Bradley Beal; Marcin Gortat (7)	John Wall (8)	Madison Square Garden; 19,033	10–13
24	December 18	@ Brooklyn	W 113–107	John Wall (21)	Trevor Booker (13)	John Wall (6)	Barclays Center; 16,187	11–13
25	December 21	@ Boston	W 106–99	Trevor Ariza (27)	Marcin Gortat (11)	John Wall (9)	TD Garden; 18,169	12–13
26	December 27	@ Minnesota	L 98–120	John Wall (26)	Trevor Booker (9)	John Wall (7)	Target Center; 16,473	12–14
27	December 28	Detroit	W 106–82	John Wall (20)	Trevor Booker (9)	John Wall (11)	Verizon Center; 19,336	13–14
28	December 30	@ Detroit	W 106–99	John Wall (29)	Trevor Ariza (11)	John Wall (7)	The Palace of Auburn Hills; 15,050	14–14

January : 8–9 (home: 3–6; road: 5–3)

Game	Date	Team	Score	High points	High rebounds	High assists	Location Attendance	Record
29	January 1	Dallas	L 78–87	John Wall (22)	Trevor Booker (19)	John Wall (5)	Verizon Center; 15,713	14–15
30	January 3	Toronto	L 88–101	Bradley Beal; Martell Webster (12)	Trevor Booker (13)	John Wall (6)	Verizon Center; 14,940	14–16
31	January 5	Golden State	L 96–112	Bradley Beal; John Wall (14)	Trevor Booker; Marcin Gortat; Jan Veselý (6)	John Wall (10)	Verizon Center; 17,390	14–17
32	January 7	@ Charlotte	W 97–83	Bradley Beal (21)	Marcin Gortat (13)	John Wall (8)	Time Warner Cable Arena; 12,079	15–17
33	January 8	@ New Orleans	W 102–96	Trevor Ariza (21)	Marcin Gortat (14)	Garrett Temple, John Wall (6)	New Orleans Arena; 17,557	16–17
34	January 10	@ Indiana	L 66–93	Bradley Beal (17)	Marcin Gortat (9)	Trevor Ariza (5)	Conseco Fieldhouse; 18,165	16–18
35	January 11	Houston	L 107–114	Trevor Ariza; John Wall (23)	Trevor Ariza (14)	John Wall (10)	Verizon Center; 17,454	16–19
36	January 13	@ Chicago	W 102–88	Nenê; John Wall (19)	Marcin Gortat (11)	John Wall (7)	United Center; 21,287	17–19
37	January 15	Miami	W 114–97	John Wall (25)	Trevor Booker (11)	Nenê; John Wall (9)	Verizon Center; 20,356	18–19
38	January 17	Chicago	W 96–93	John Wall (23)	Trevor Ariza (8)	John Wall (11)	Verizon Center; 17,005	19–19
39	January 18	Detroit	L 98–104	John Wall (34)	Marcin Gortat (12)	Trevor Ariza (7)	Verizon Center; 17,039	19–20
40	January 20	Philadelphia	W 107–99	Bradley Beal (22)	Marcin Gortat (11)	Bradley Beal (8)	Verizon Center; 18,650	20–20
41	January 22	Boston	L 111–113 (OT)	John Wall (28)	Marcin Gortat (13)	John Wall (10)	Verizon Center; 14,492	20–21
42	January 24	@ Phoenix	W 101–95	Trevor Ariza (23)	Nenê (8)	John Wall (12)	US Airways Center; 16,198	21–21
43	January 25	@ Utah	L 101–104	Trevor Ariza (23)	Marcin Gortat (11)	Bradley Beal (8)	EnergySolutions Arena; 17,754	21–22
44	January 28	@ Golden State	W 88–85	Bradley Beal (20)	Marcin Gortat (12)	John Wall (5)	Oracle Arena; 19,596	22–22
45	January 29	@ L.A. Clippers	L 103–110	Bradley Beal (20)	Nenê (8)	John Wall (11)	Staples Center; 19,060	22–23

February : 8–5 (home: 5–3; road: 3–2)

Game	Date	Team	Score	High points	High rebounds	High assists	Location Attendance	Record
46	February 1	Oklahoma City	W 96–81	Trevor Ariza (18)	Marcin Gortat (14)	John Wall (15)	Verizon Center; 20,356	23–23
47	February 3	Portland	W 100–90	John Wall (22)	Marcin Gortat (11)	John Wall (6)	Verizon Center; 13,259	24–23
48	February 5	San Antonio	L 118–125 (2OT)	John Wall (29)	Trevor Ariza (10)	John Wall (9)	Verizon Center; 15,791	24–24
49	February 7	Cleveland	L 113–115	John Wall (32)	Nenê, Marcin Gortat (8)	John Wall (10)	Verizon Center; 16,294	24–25
50	February 9	Sacramento	W 93–84	Nenê (18)	Marcin Gortat (8)	Nenê; Bradley Beal (5)	Verizon Center; 18,173	25–25
51	February 11	@ Memphis	L 89–92	Bradley Beal (37)	Marcin Gortat (6)	John Wall (5)	FedExForum; 15,613	25–26
52	February 12	@ Houston	L 112–113	Trevor Ariza (32)	Trevor Ariza (11)	John Wall (14)	Toyota Center; 18,314	25–27
All-Star Break
53	February 18	Toronto	L 93–103	John Wall (22)	Trevor Ariza; Marcin Gortat (11)	John Wall (7)	Verizon Center; 15,624	25–28
54	February 19	@ Atlanta	W 114–97	John Wall (21)	Marcin Gortat (12)	John Wall (12)	Philips Arena; 13,529	26–28
55	February 22	New Orleans	W 94–93	Nenê (30)	Marcin Gortat (10)	John Wall (12)	Verizon Center; 18,385	27–28
56	February 23	@ Cleveland	W 96–83	John Wall (21)	Marcin Gortat (13)	John Wall (9)	Quicken Loans Arena; 17,238	28–28
57	February 25	Orlando	W 115–106	John Wall (27)	Marcin Gortat (10)	John Wall (7)	Verizon Center; 13,306	29–28
58	February 27	@ Toronto	W 134–129 (3OT)	Marcin Gortat; John Wall (31)	Marcin Gortat (12)	John Wall (9)	Air Canada Centre; 17,758	30–28

March : 8–8 (home: 4–3; road: 4–5)

Game	Date	Team	Score	High points	High rebounds	High assists	Location Attendance	Record
59	March 1	@ Philadelphia	W 122–103	Trevor Ariza (40)	Marcin Gortat (14)	John Wall (16)	Wells Fargo Center; 20,856	31–28
60	March 3	Memphis	L 104–110	John Wall (23)	Marcin Gortat (8)	John Wall (9)	Verizon Center; 14,065	31–29
61	March 5	Utah	W 104–91	Trevor Ariza (26)	Marcin Gortat (9)	John Wall (10)	Verizon Center; 13,911	32–29
62	March 8	@ Milwaukee	W 114–107	Trevor Ariza (28)	Trevor Ariza (7)	John Wall (13)	BMO Harris Bradley Center; 14,839	33–29
63	March 10	@ Miami	L 90–99	Bradley Beal (18)	Marcin Gortat (18)	John Wall (8)	American Airlines Arena; 19,657	33–30
64	March 12	Charlotte	L 85–98	John Wall (23)	Marcin Gortat (10)	Andre Miller (5)	Verizon Center; 17,220	33–31
65	March 14	@ Orlando	W 105–101 (OT)	Ariza & Wall (21)	Marcin Gortat (14)	John Wall (11)	Amway Center; 16,011	34–31
66	March 15	Brooklyn	W 101–94	John Wall (33)	Drew Gooden (9)	John Wall (6)	Verizon Center; 20,356	35–31
67	March 18	@ Sacramento	L 111–117 (OT)	Beal & Gortat (19)	Marcin Gortat (14)	John Wall (8)	Sleep Train Arena; 16,084	35–32
68	March 20	@ Portland	L 103–116	John Wall (24)	Ariza & Gooden (9)	John Wall (14)	Moda Center; 19,571	35–33
69	March 21	@ L.A. Lakers	W 117–107	John Wall (28)	Marcin Gortat (13)	John Wall (14)	Staples Center; 18,112	36–33
70	March 23	@ Denver	L 102–105	Bradley Beal (21)	Marcin Gortat (10)	Marcin Gortat (5)	Pepsi Center; 18,324	36–34
71	March 26	Phoenix	L 93–99	John Wall (29)	Trevor Ariza (8)	John Wall (6)	Verizon Center; 18,805	36–35
72	March 28	Indiana	W 91–78	John Wall (20)	Marcin Gortat (12)	John Wall (8)	Verizon Center; 19,708	37–35
73	March 29	Atlanta	W 101–97	John Wall (25)	Marcin Gortat (11)	John Wall (6)	Verizon Center; 17,996	38–35
74	March 31	@ Charlotte	L 94–100	Bradley Beal (20)	Marcin Gortat (11)	Andre Miller (9)	Time Warner Cable Arena; 14,894	38–36

April : 6–2 (home: 3–2; road: 3–0)

Game	Date	Team	Score	High points	High rebounds	High assists	Location Attendance	Record
75	April 2	Boston	W 118–92	Marcin Gortat (22)	Marcin Gortat (8)	John Wall (10)	Verizon Center; 17,770	39–36
76	April 4	@ New York	W 90–89	Bradley Beal (28)	Marcin Gortat (10)	John Wall (9)	Madison Square Garden; 19,812	40–36
77	April 5	Chicago	L 78–96	John Wall (20)	Marcin Gortat (8)	John Wall (6)	Verizon Center; 19,661	40–37
78	April 9	Charlotte	L 88–94 (OT)	Marcin Gortat (27)	Marcin Gortat (14)	John Wall (11)	Verizon Center; 17,784	40–38
79	April 11	@ Orlando	W 96–86	Nenê (17)	Porter & Harrington (9)	John Wall (12)	Amway Center; 17,009	41–38
80	April 12	Milwaukee	W 104–91	Bradley Beal (26)	Marcin Gortat (13)	John Wall (8)	Verizon Center; 17,278	42–38
81	April 14	Miami	W 114–93	Trevor Ariza (25)	Marcin Gortat (13)	John Wall (13)	Verizon Center; 20,356	43–38
82	April 16	@ Boston	W 118–102	Bradley Beal (27)	Marcin Gortat (10)	John Wall (9)	TD Garden; 18,624	44–38

2013–14 season schedule

== Playoffs ==
=== Game log ===
2014 playoff game log
Total: 6–5 (home: 1–4; road: 5–1)
First Round: 4–1 (home: 1–1; road: 3–0)

Game	Date	Team	Score	High points	High rebounds	High assists	Location Attendance	Series
1	April 20	@ Chicago	W 102–93	Nenê (24)	Marcin Gortat (13)	Bradley Beal (7)	United Center; 21,694	1–0
2	April 22	@ Chicago	W 101–99 (OT)	Bradley Beal (26)	Ariza & Booker (8)	Ariza & Wall (7)	United Center; 21,663	2–0
3	April 25	Chicago	L 97–100	Bradley Beal (25)	Gortat & Ariza (11)	John Wall (7)	Verizon Center; 23,356	2–1
4	April 27	Chicago	W 98–89	Trevor Ariza (30)	Trevor Booker (9)	John Wall (10)	Verizon Center; 20,356	3–1
5	April 29	@ Chicago	W 75–69	John Wall (24)	Marcin Gortat (13)	Nenê, Beal & Wall (4)	United Center; 21,752	4–1

Conference Semifinals: 2–4 (home: 0–3; road: 2–1)

Game	Date	Team	Score	High points	High rebounds	High assists	Location Attendance	Series
1	May 5	@ Indiana	W 102–96	Bradley Beal (25)	Marcin Gortat (15)	John Wall (9)	Bankers Life Fieldhouse; 18,165	1–0
2	May 7	@ Indiana	L 82–86	Marcin Gortat (21)	Marcin Gortat (11)	John Wall (8)	Bankers Life Fieldhouse; 18,165	1–1
3	May 9	Indiana	L 63–85	Bradley Beal (16)	Trevor Ariza (15)	John Wall (6)	Verizon Center; 20,356	1–2
4	May 11	Indiana	L 92–95	Bradley Beal (20)	Trevor Ariza (9)	John Wall (7)	Verizon Center; 20,356	1–3
5	May 13	@ Indiana	W 102–79	Marcin Gortat (31)	Marcin Gortat (16)	Ariza & Wall (5)	Bankers Life Fieldhouse; 18,165	2–3
6	May 15	Indiana	L 80–93	Marcin Gortat (19)	Trevor Ariza (7)	John Wall (9)	Verizon Center; 19,502	2–4

2014 playoff schedule

== Player statistics ==
Legend
GP	Games played	GS	Games started	MPG	Minutes per game
FG%	Field-goal percentage	3P%	3-point field-goal percentage	FT%	Free-throw percentage
RPG	Rebounds per game	APG	Assists per game	SPG	Steals per game
BPG	Blocks per game	PPG	Points per game

=== Regular season ===
Washington Wizards statistics
Player	GP	GS	MPG	FG%	3P%	FT%	RPG	APG	SPG	BPG	PPG
John Wall	82	82	36.3	.433	.351	.805	4.1	8.8	1.8	.5	19.3
Marcin Gortat	81	80	32.8	.542	1.000	.686	9.5	1.7	.5	1.5	13.2
Martell Webster	78	13	27.7	.433	.392	.840	2.8	1.2	.5	.2	9.7
Trevor Ariza	77	77	35.4	.456	.407	.772	6.2	2.5	1.6	.3	14.4
Garrett Temple	75	0	8.5	.362	.207	.698	.9	1.0	.5	.1	1.8
Bradley Beal	73	73	34.7	.419	.402	.788	3.7	3.3	1.0	.2	17.1
Trevor Booker	72	45	21.6	.551	.000	.618	5.3	.9	.6	.6	6.8
Nenê	53	37	29.4	.503	.200	.583	5.5	2.9	1.2	.9	14.2
Kevin Séraphin	53	1	10.9	.505		.871	2.4	.3	.1	.5	4.7
Otto Porter Jr.	37	0	8.6	.363	.190	.667	1.5	.3	.2	.0	2.1
Al Harrington	34	0	15.0	.396	.340	.771	2.4	.8	.4	.0	6.6
Jan Veselý^{†}	33	1	14.2	.522		.267	3.4	.3	.8	.6	3.2
Andre Miller^{†}	28	0	14.7	.460	.667	.833	2.0	3.5	.7	.1	3.8
Chris Singleton	25	0	10.0	.373	.368	.720	2.2	.2	.4	.1	3.0
Eric Maynor^{†}	23	0	9.3	.292	.320	.667	1.0	1.7	.2	.0	2.3
Drew Gooden	22	0	18.0	.531	.412	.889	5.2	.7	.5	.3	8.3
Glen Rice Jr.	11	1	9.9	.297	.294	.714	1.8	.6	.5	.1	2.9

=== Playoffs ===
Washington Wizards statistics
Player	GP	GS	MPG	FG%	3P%	FT%	RPG	APG	SPG	BPG	PPG
Bradley Beal	11	11	41.6	.424	.415	.796	5.0	4.5	1.6	.6	19.2
John Wall	11	11	38.2	.366	.219	.765	4.0	7.1	1.6	.7	16.3
Trevor Ariza	11	11	37.0	.481	.446	.778	8.9	1.7	1.5	.4	13.6
Marcin Gortat	11	11	34.7	.492		.659	9.9	1.5	.5	1.3	13.0
Martell Webster	11	0	17.7	.366	.231	.667	2.3	.5	.4	.5	3.8
Andre Miller	11	0	9.8	.463	.333	.556	1.0	.8	.3	.0	4.0
Nenê	10	10	32.5	.464		.346	5.3	2.6	.9	1.1	13.7
Drew Gooden	10	0	14.6	.368	.000	.750	4.2	.4	.3	.4	3.4
Garrett Temple	10	0	0.9	1.000	1.000		.0	.0	.0	.0	.5
Trevor Booker	9	1	16.2	.448	.000	.667	4.3	.9	.2	1.0	3.3
Al Harrington	7	0	8.4	.400	.000	.714	2.3	.0	.4	.0	2.4
Kevin Séraphin	4	0	1.5	.000			.5	.0	.0	.0	.0
Otto Porter Jr.	3	0	2.0	.333	.000		.0	.0	.0	.0	.7

- ^{†} Denotes player spent time with another team in the season. Stats reflect time with the Wizards only.

== Transactions ==
=== Overview ===
Players Added

Via draft

- Otto Porter
- Glen Rice Jr.

Via free agency

- Eric Maynor

Via trade

- Marcin Gortat
- Al Harrington
- Andre Miller
Players Lost

Via trade

- Emeka Okafor

Via free agency

- A. J. Price

Waived

=== Trades ===
October 25, 2013	To Washington Wizards Marcin Gortat; Kendall Marshall; Shannon Brown; Malcolm Lee	To Phoenix Suns Emeka Okafor; Top 12 protected pick in 2014
February 20, 2014	To Washington Wizards Andre Miller; 2014 second round pick	To Denver Nuggets Jan Veselý	To Philadelphia Sixers Eric Maynor; 2016 second round pick

=== Free agents ===
Additions
Player	Date signed	Former team
Cartier Martin	July 12	Washington Wizards (re-signed)
A. J. Price	July 24	Indiana Pacers
Martell Webster	August 29	Minnesota Timberwolves
Brian Cook	September 19	Washington Wizards (re-signed)
Earl Barron	September 19	Atléticos de San Germán (Puerto Rico)
Steven Gray	September 19	BK Ventspils (Latvia)
Shavlik Randolph	September 19	Piratas de Quebradillas (Puerto Rico)
Jannero Pargo	October 1	Atlanta Hawks

Subtractions
Player	Date signed	New team
Roger Mason, Jr.	August 3	New Orleans Pelicans
Morris Almond	August 19	Red Star Belgrade (Serbia)
James Singleton	September 18	Xinjiang Flying Tigers (China)
Othyus Jeffers	October 1	Phoenix Suns
