= 2013–14 Brooklyn Nets season =

Season of National Basketball Association team the Brooklyn Nets

- Head coach: Jason Kidd
- General manager: Billy King
- Owners: Mikhail Prokhorov
- Arena: Barclays Center

Results
- Record: 44–38 (.537)
- Place: Division: 2nd (Atlantic); Conference: 6th (Eastern)
- Playoff finish: Conference semifinals (lost to Heat 1–4)
- Stats at Basketball Reference

Local media
- Television: YES Network, WWOR
- Radio: WFAN

The 2013–14 Brooklyn Nets season was 47th season of the franchise, its 38th in the National Basketball Association (NBA), and its second season playing in the New York City borough of Brooklyn.

After making the playoffs for the first time in six years during the 2012–13 season, the Nets had a busy off-season which featured the hiring of Jason Kidd (who played for the then-New Jersey Nets from 2001 to 2008 and led the Nets to back-to-back NBA Finals in 2002 and 2003) as the head coach. The Nets also traded Gerald Wallace, Kris Humphries, and three future draft picks to the Celtics for all-stars Kevin Garnett and Paul Pierce, along with Jason Terry. These transactions led to the Nets having the largest payroll in the NBA, and high expectations heading into the season. Despite an underwhelming regular season, the Nets would make the playoffs and upset the Toronto Raptors in seven games in the first round. However, in the Semifinals, the Nets would go on to lose to the two-time defending NBA champion and eventual Eastern Conference champion Miami Heat in five games despite sweeping the Heat, 4 games to 0, in the regular season.

Following the season, Pierce signed with the Washington Wizards.

== Preseason ==
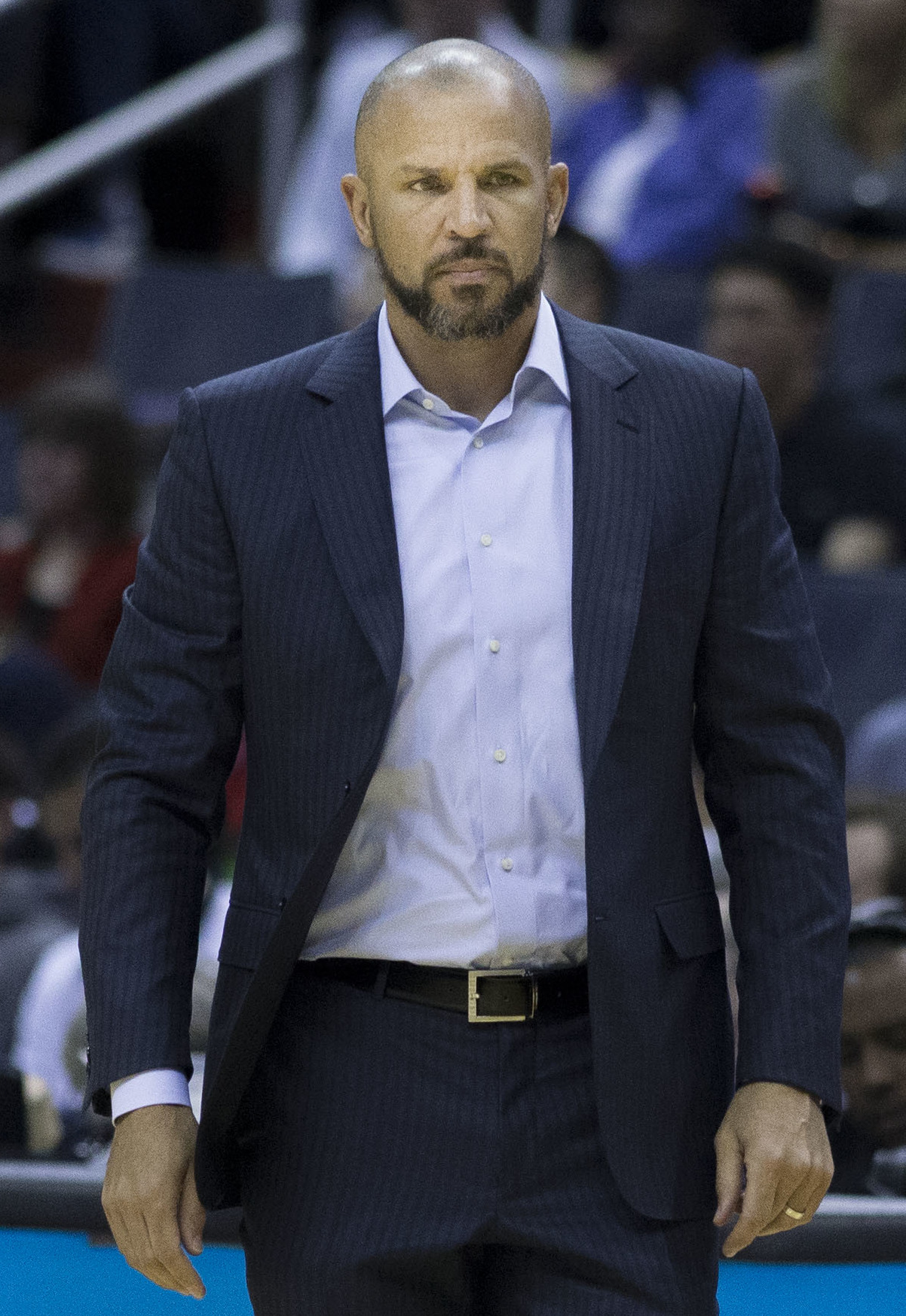
Jason Kidd became head coach on June 12, 2013.

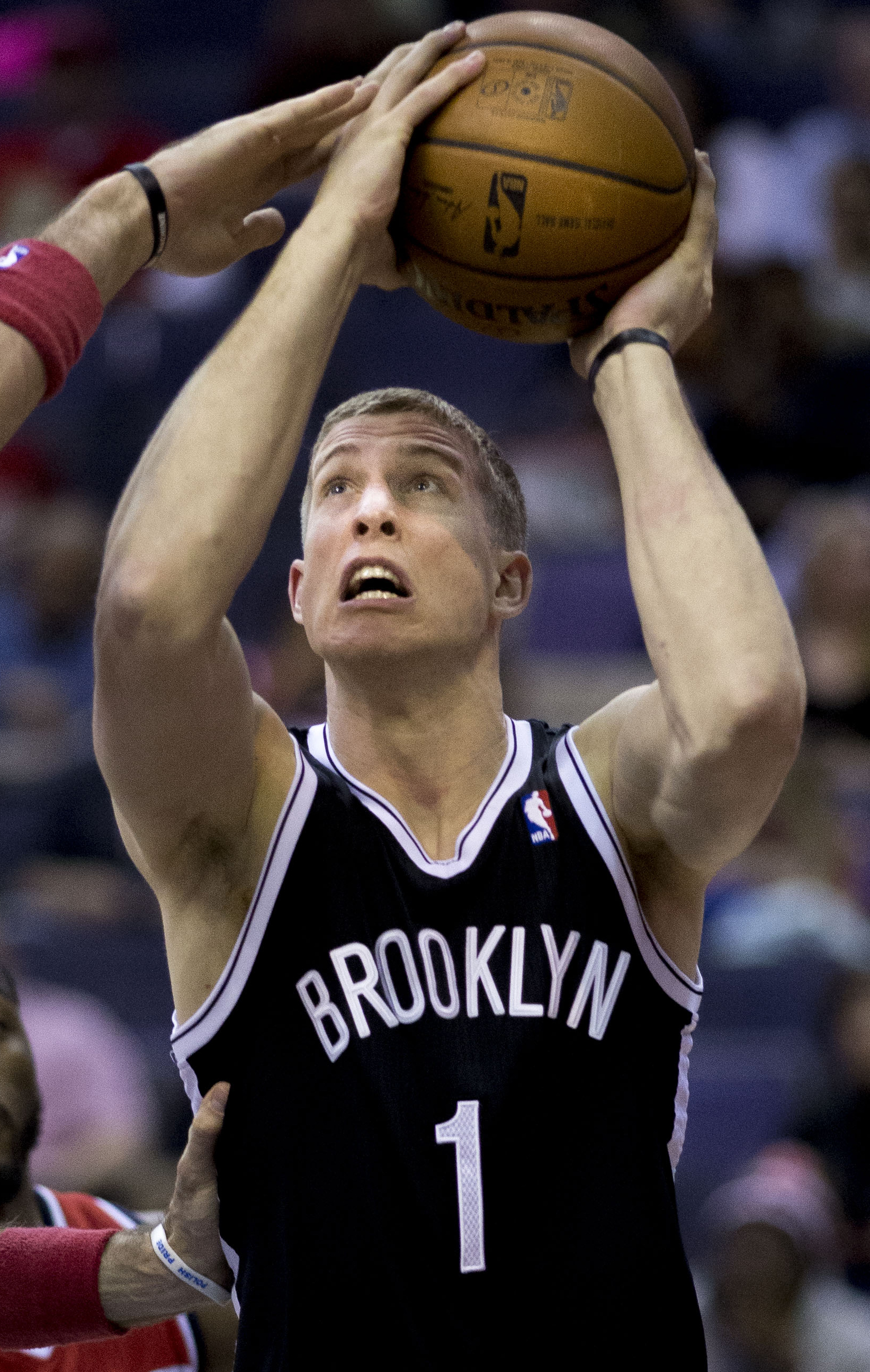
Mason Plumlee was drafted by the Nets on June 27, 2013.

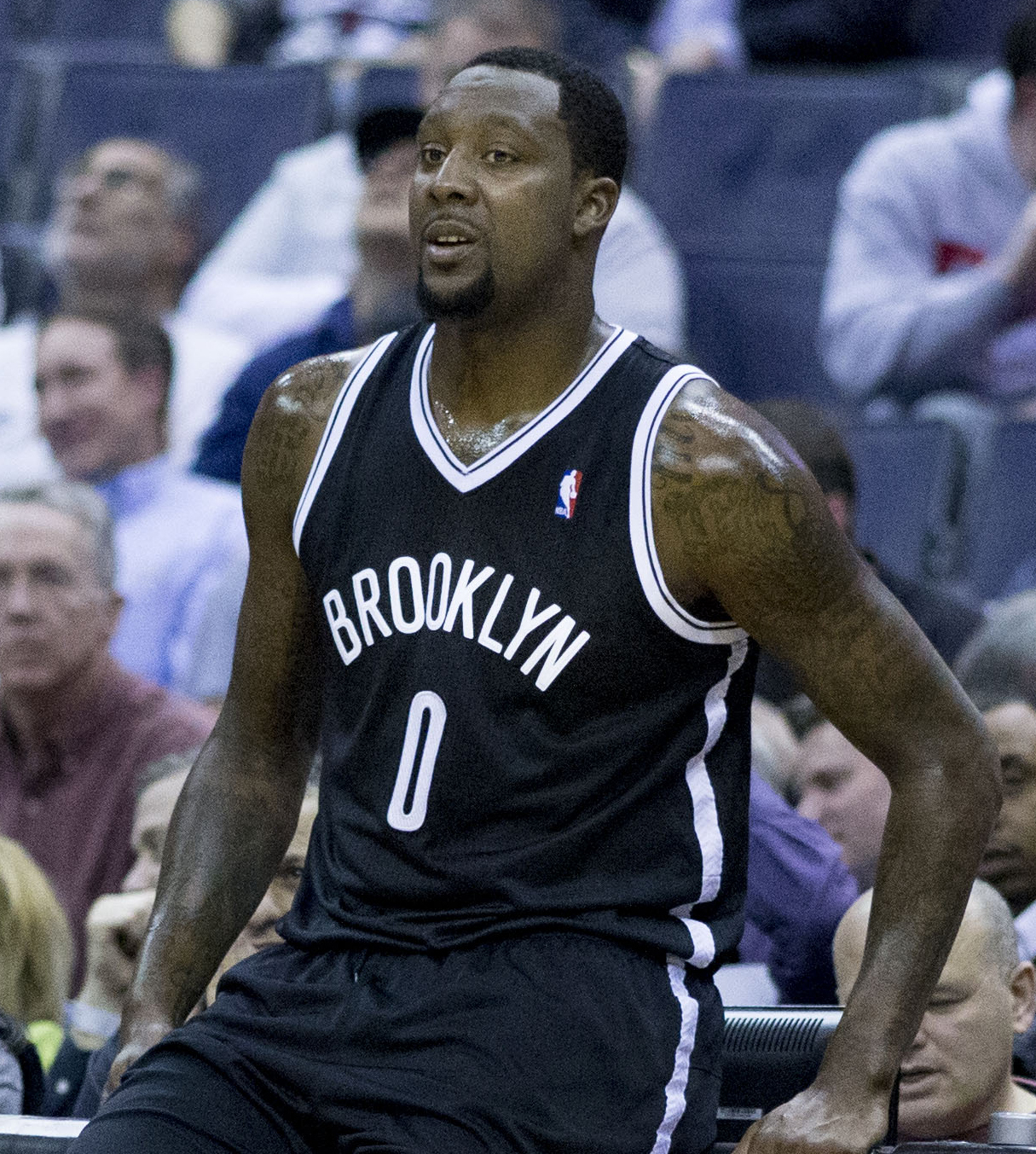
Andray Blatche re-signed with the Nets on July 11, 2013.

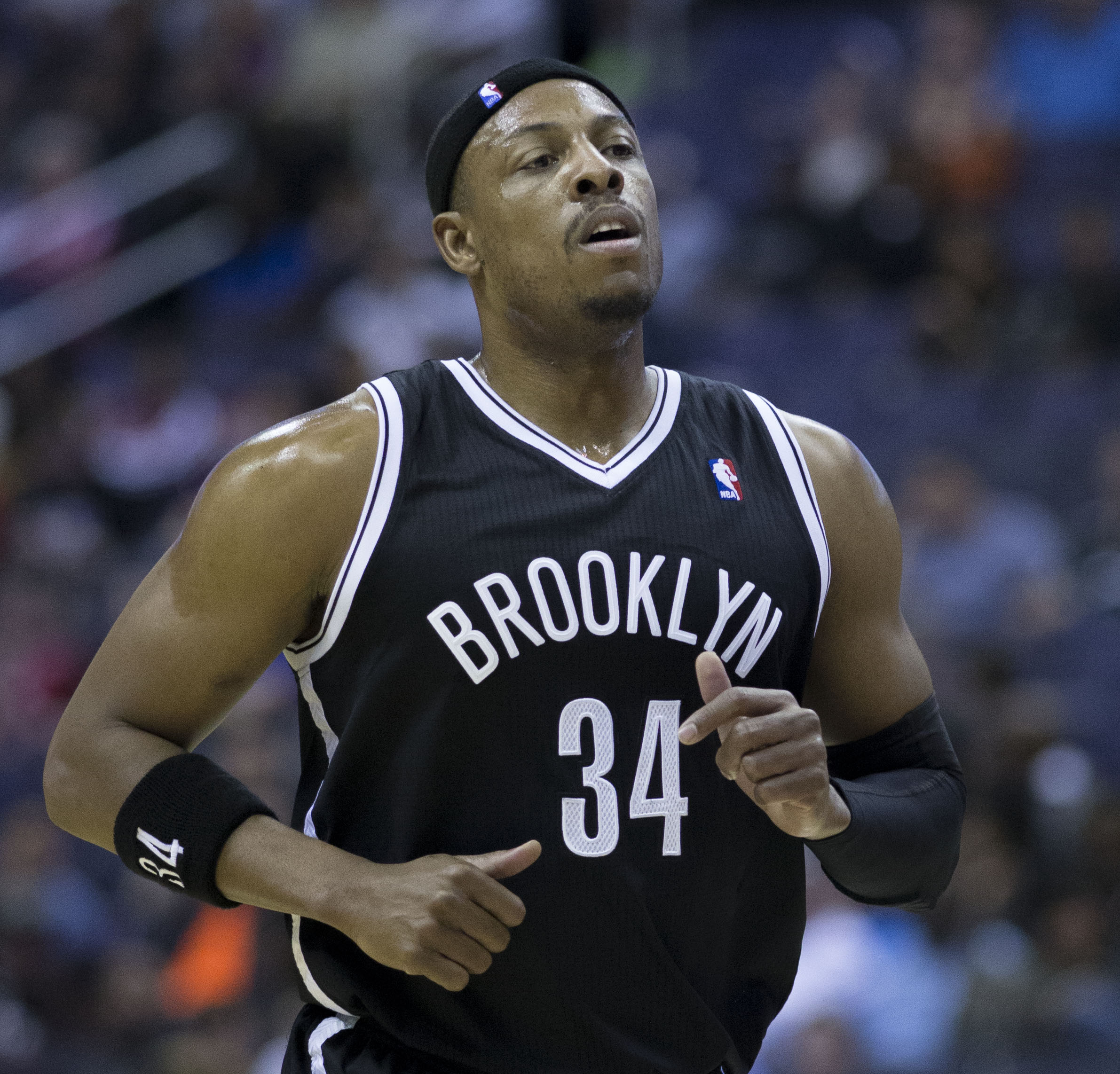
Paul Pierce was traded to the Nets on July 12, 2013.

=== Draft picks ===
Round	Pick	Player	Position	Nationality	College/Team
1	22	Mason Plumlee	C	United States	Duke

== Regular season ==
=== October–November ===
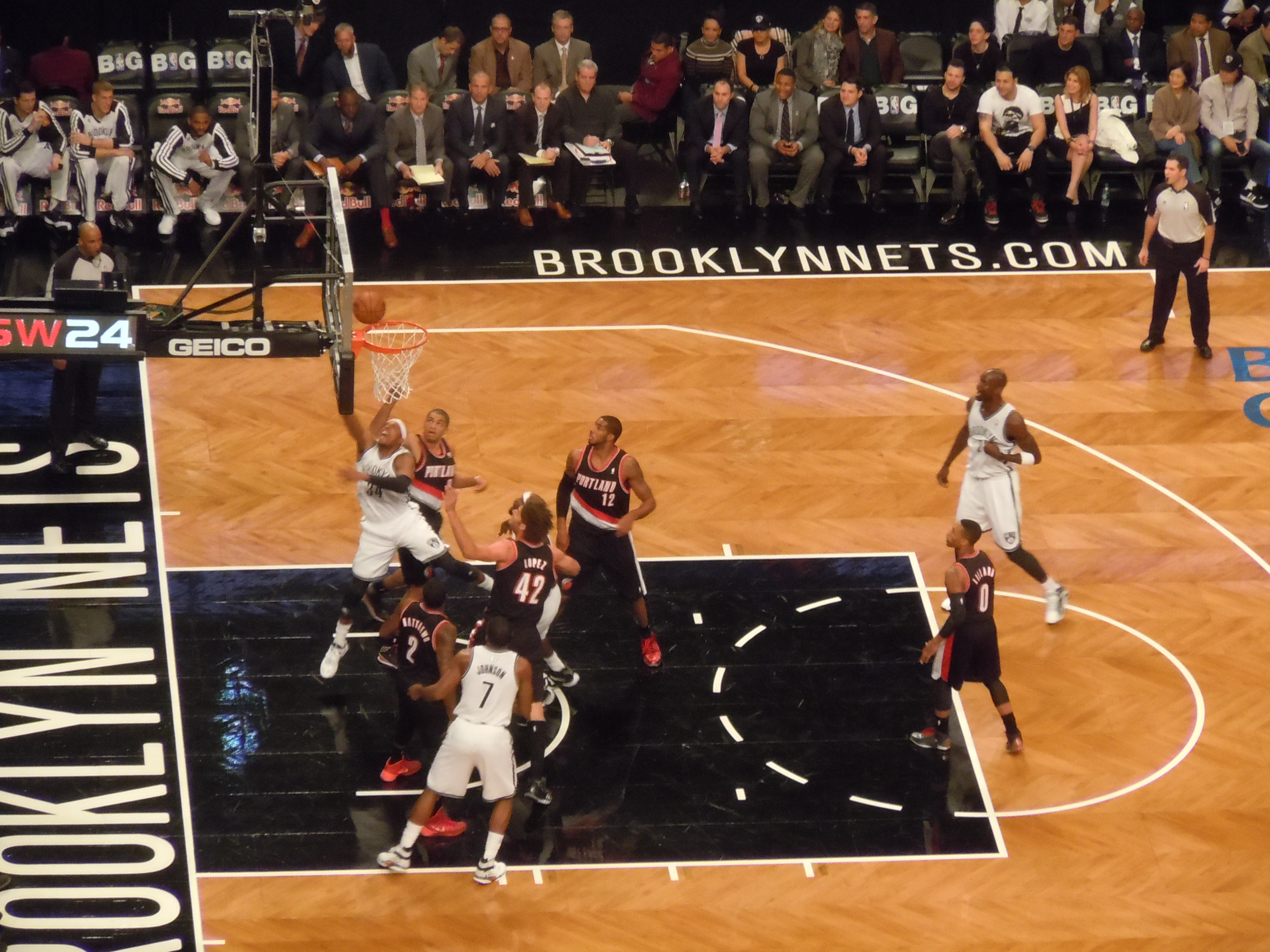
The Nets playing the Portland Trail Blazers on November 18.

The Nets' season began on October 30 with a 94–98 loss to the Cleveland Cavaliers. In their home opener at the Barclays Center, the Nets defeated the Miami Heat, 101–100, on November 1. On November 3, the Nets lost to the Orlando Magic, being downed 1–2 in the regular season. The Nets had defeated the Utah Jazz in a blowout on November 5. In the first game of back-to-backs on November 8, the Nets lost to the Washington Wizards in overtime, 108–112. On November 9, the Nets lost the second game of the back-to-back to the Indiana Pacers, 91–96. The Sacramento Kings defeated the Nets in a blowout on November 13, losing three straight games.

On November 15, the Nets defeated the Phoenix Suns 100–98 in overtime. The Nets lost on November 16 to the Los Angeles Clippers, 103–110. In their game against the Clippers, the Nets were without four of their starters, due to injuries. The Nets lost against the Portland Trail Blazers on November 18. On November 20, the Nets were defeated 91–95 by the Charlotte Bobcats. On November 22, the Nets lost four straight following a loss to the Minnesota Timberwolves. After losing to the Detroit Pistons, their losing streak stretched to five on November 24.

On November 26, the Nets defeated the Toronto Raptors, 102–100, to end their losing streak. However, the Nets lost to the Los Angeles Lakers on November 27. On November 29, the Nets lost against the Houston Rockets. At the end of the month, the Nets defeated the Memphis Grizzlies with a 5–12 record.

=== December ===
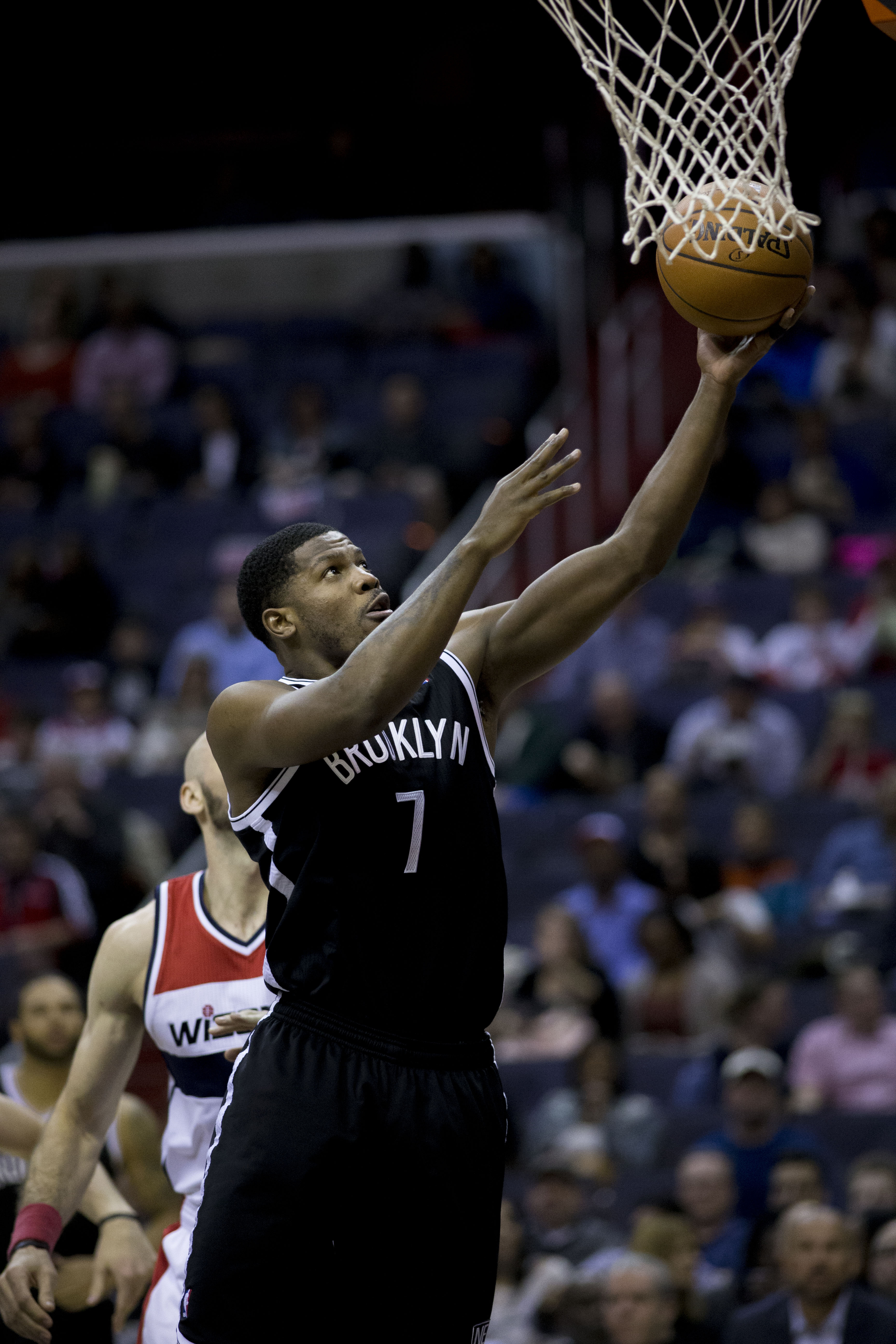
Joe Johnson had tied an NBA record by shooting eight three-point field goals in one quarter on December 16.

The Nets would begin the month of December with a blowout loss to the Denver Nuggets. On December 5, the Nets would continue their losing ways in another blowout loss against the New York Knicks. On December 7, the Nets would defeat the Milwaukee Bucks. Then, the Nets would defeat the Boston Celtics on December 10. The Nets would extend their winning streak to three following a win against the Clippers on December 12. Their brief winning streak would come to an end on December 13 against the Pistons.

On December 16, the Nets easily defeated the Philadelphia 76ers in a 36-point blowout. In that game, Joe Johnson, managed to shoot eight three-point field goals in the third quarter to tie an official NBA record. The Nets would lose against the Wizards on December 18. Two days later, the Nets would lose to the 76ers in overtime, 120–121. The 76ers would win the game with a buzzer beater by Evan Turner. On December 21, Brook Lopez was sidelined with a fractured right foot that ended his season.

On December 23, the Nets would lose their third straight game to the Pacers. Then, the Nets would lose again on Christmas, this time to the Chicago Bulls, stretching their losing streak to four. On December 27, the Nets would finally win by defeating the Bucks. Following the win, the Nets would lose against the Pacers on December 28. To end the calendar year, the Nets would lose against the San Antonio Spurs for the second December 31 in a row. Heading into 2014, the Nets were 10–21.

=== January ===
At the turn of the calendar, the Nets' misfortunes had been lifted on January 2 when Joe Johnson shot a buzzer beater against the Oklahoma City Thunder to win the game 95–93. The Nets would defeat the Cavaliers, 89–82, on January 4. To win their third straight game, the Nets defeated the Atlanta Hawks. On January 8, the Nets then ended the Golden State Warriors' 10-game winning streak, becoming 4–0 in 2014. Then, on January 10, the Nets' winning streak extended to 5 games after a victory against the Heat in double overtime.

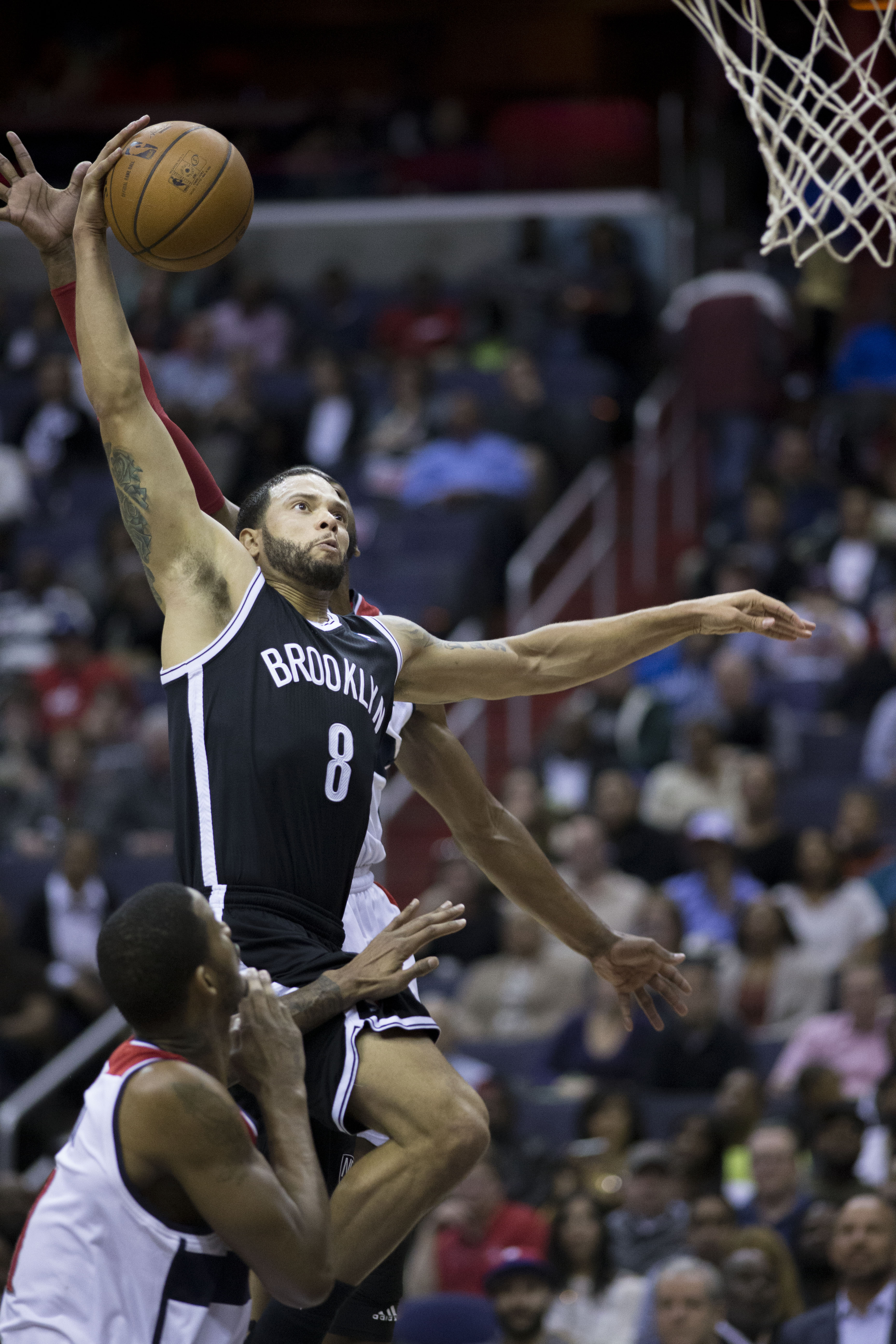
Deron Williams about to attempt a dunk.

The Nets would suffer their first defeat in 2014 to the Raptors on January 11. On January 16, the Nets would defeat the Hawks in The O2 Arena in London. The Nets would head to Madison Square Garden and blowout their cross-city rival, the Knicks, on January 20. On January 21, the Nets would defeat the Magic, winning their third straight game. The Nets would then defeat the Dallas Mavericks by one point, and going 9–1 in 2014. On January 26, Paul Pierce and Kevin Garnett would go back to Boston and win their fifth straight game.

The Nets would suffer their second loss of the year on January 27 to the Raptors, losing by one point (103–104). As the month was coming to a close, the Nets would be handed a third loss by the Thunder on January 31. At the end of the month, the Nets' record would be 20–24.

=== February ===
In their first game of the month, the Nets would lose by one point (96–97) to the Pacers on February 1. On February 3, the Nets defeated the 76ers, 108–102. On the same day, Kidd would be named the Coach of the Month for January, when he coached the team to have a 10–3 record in that month. Playing an injury-plagued Spurs on February 6, the Nets defeated San Antonio. On February 7, the Nets were defeated by the Pistons. With the Nets' rookie, Mason Plumlee, leading the team for the night, Brooklyn defeated the New Orleans Pelicans on February 9.

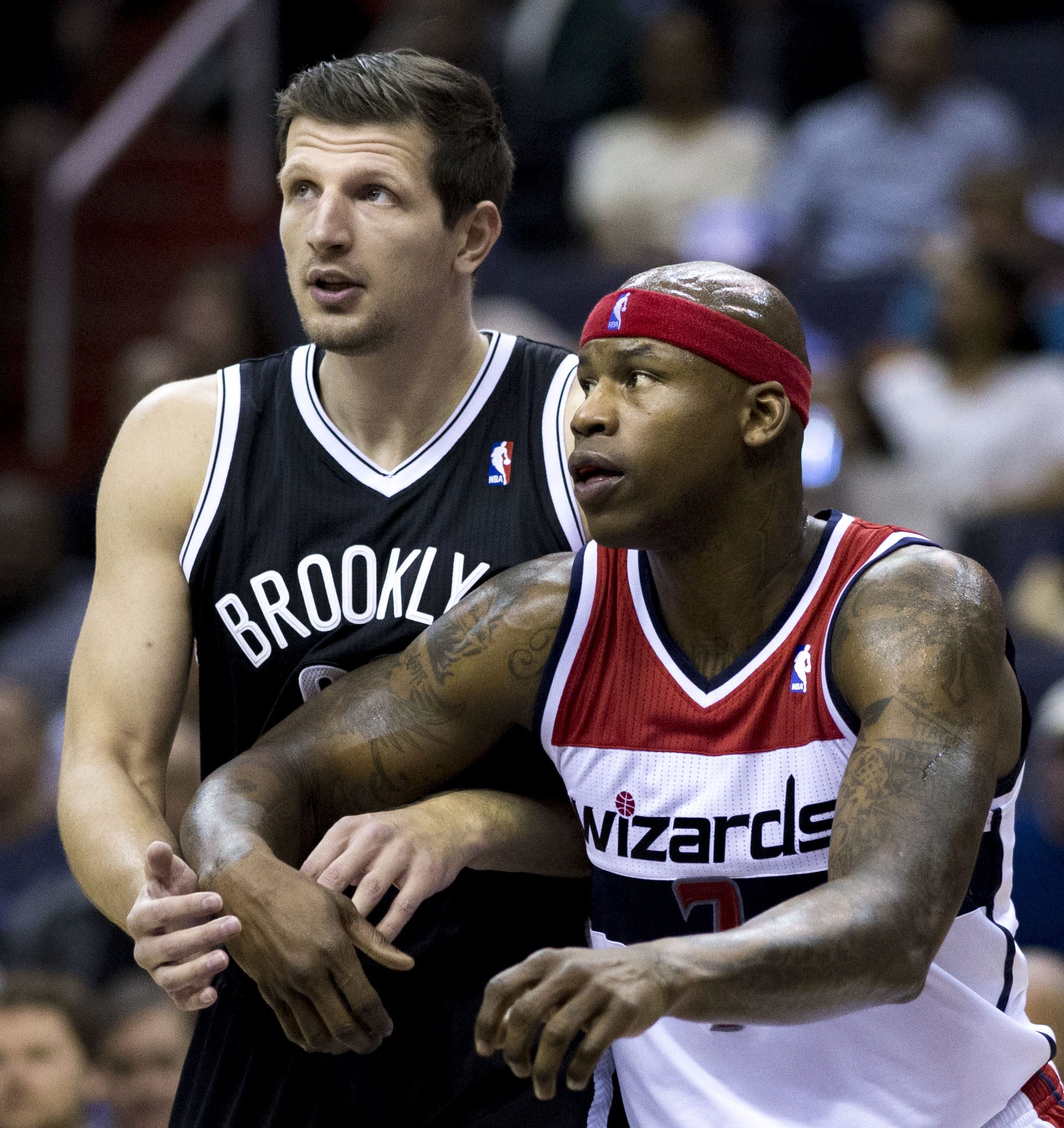
Mirza Teletović guarding Al Harrington in a game against the Washington Wizards.

On February 12, the Nets defeated the Bobcats behind Pierce's 25 points. The Nets were defeated by 16 points against the Bulls on February 13. Representing the Nets, Johnson had scored 5 points, 1 rebound, and 1 assist at the 2014 NBA All-Star Game. Playing the Jazz in the EnergySolutions Arena, the Nets defeated Utah on February 19, 105–99. On February 22, the Nets lost to the Warriors.

The Nets won against the Lakers on February 23, 108–102. In that game, Jason Collins made his debut as the first publicly gay athlete to play in any of four major North American pro sports leagues. On February 26, the Nets were defeated in a 44-point blowout against the Trail Blazers. To respond to their humiliating loss, the Nets defeated the Nuggets by 23 points. The Nets would end the month of February being two games under .500, 27–29.

=== March ===
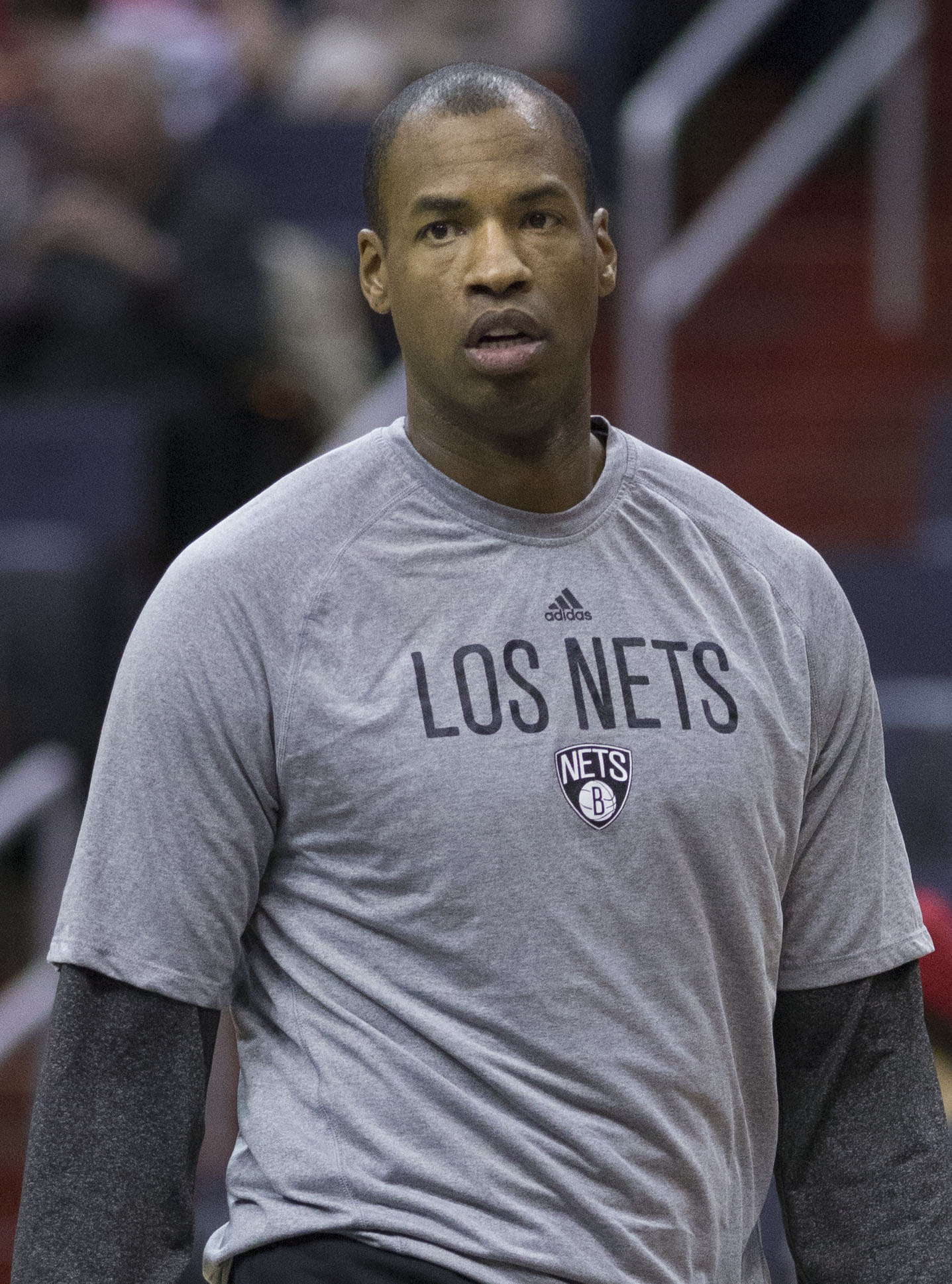
Jason Collins made his debut as the first publicly gay athlete to play in any of four major North American pro sports leagues with the Nets.

To start off the month of March, the Nets defeated the Bucks behind Marcus Thornton's 25 points. The Nets were at the .500 mark (29–29) for the first time since November 5 with a victory against the Bulls on March 3. Two days later, the Nets were above .500 for the first time (30–29) of the season after defeating the Grizzlies and winning their third straight game.

On March 7, the Nets were defeated by the Celtics, ending their 3-game winning streak. The Nets would bounce back to win in a back-to-back against Sacramento and Toronto from March 9–10. To win three straight games once more, the Nets defeated the Heat on March 12, 96–95, due to a bad inbound pass by Chris Bosh. The Nets' winning streak would end against the Wizards on March 15.

On March 17, the Nets defeated the Suns behind Williams' 28 points. To win their tenth straight home game, the Nets defeated the Bobcats on March 19, 104–99. On March 21, the Nets would defeat the Celtics in a blowout. On March 23, the Nets completed a season sweep of the Mavericks for the first time since the 1999–2000 season, by defeating them 107–104 in overtime.

In overtime, the Nets would be defeated by the Pelicans on March 24, 104–109. Playing in their third straight overtime game, the Nets would lose 111–116, to the Bobcats on March 26. On March 28, the Nets defeated the Cavaliers. The Nets would end the month defeating the Timberwolves and tying a franchise-record 13-straight home games on March 30. With the month over, the Nets' record would be at 39–33.

=== April ===
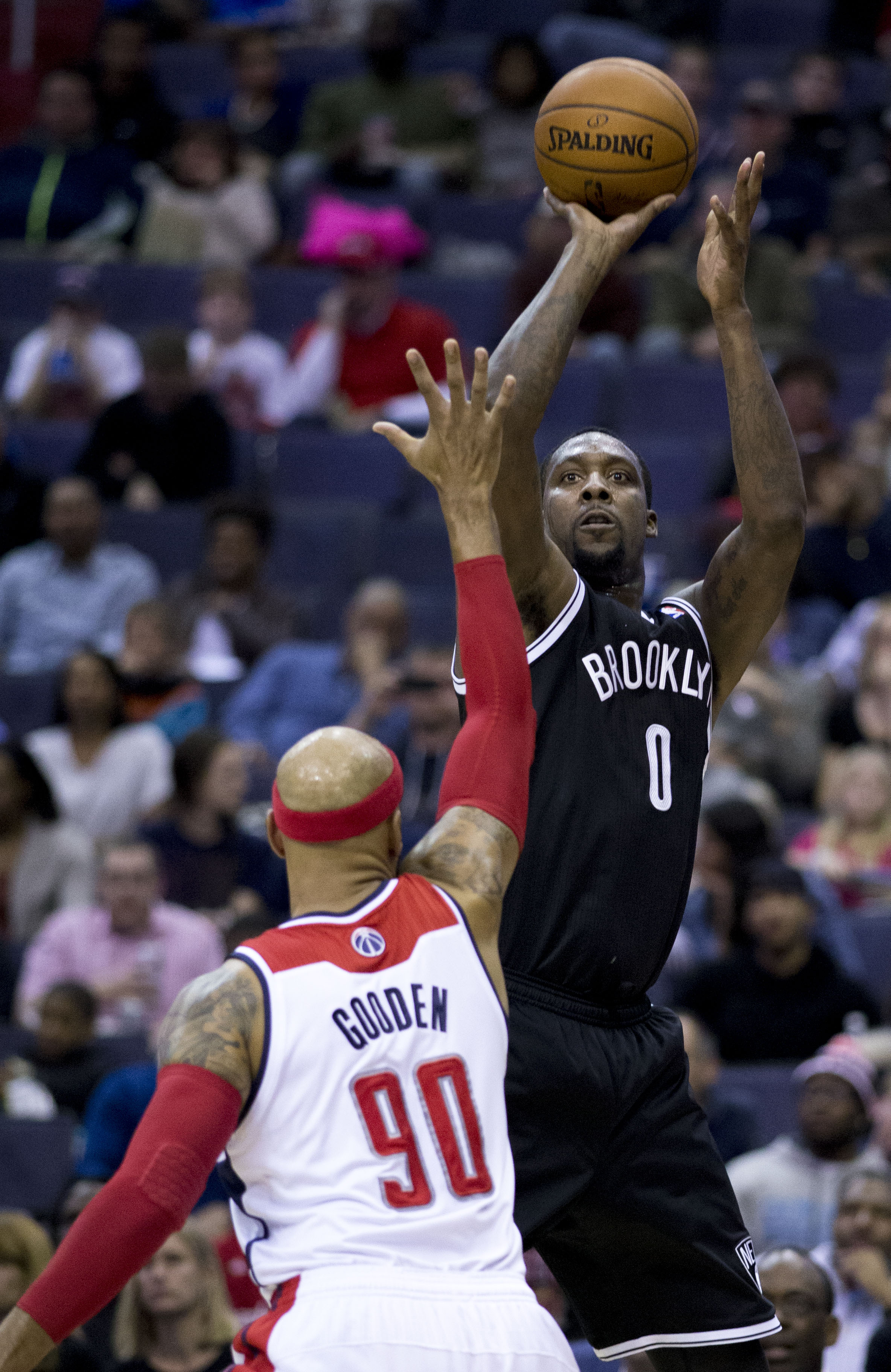
Andray Blatche shooting over Drew Gooden.

The Nets would end their 14-game losing streak versus the Rockets on April 1, extend their home game winning streak to 14, and clinch a playoff berth in the process. On the same day, Kidd was named the Coach of the Month for March, when he coached the team to have a 12–4 record in that month. The Nets would be defeated in a 29-point blowout against the Knicks on April 2. On April 4, the Nets won a franchise record of 15-consecutive home games following a 116–104 win over the Pistons. Brooklyn had defeated the 76ers on April 5, 105–101. The Nets completed a 4-game season sweep against the Heat on April 8, which would be the first time that a team would sweep the Heat during the Miami Big 3 (Chris Bosh, LeBron James, and Dwyane Wade) era.

The Nets would lose 111–115 to the Magic on April 9. On April 11, the Nets were defeated by the Hawks, 88–93. To avenge their earlier loss, the Nets defeated the Magic on April 13. The Nets lost by 11 points to the Knicks on April 15. On April 16, the Nets' regular season ended with an 85–114 loss to the Cavaliers. Following the loss, the Nets finished with a 44–38 record, being the sixth seed in the 2014 NBA Playoffs. It was widely suspected that Brooklyn's late season losses correlated with a preference for facing Toronto in the first round.

=== Standings ===
Atlantic Division	W	L	PCT	GB	Home	Road	Div	GP
y-Toronto Raptors	48	34	.585	–	26‍–‍15	22‍–‍19	11–5	82
x-Brooklyn Nets	44	38	.537	4.0	28‍–‍13	16‍–‍25	9–7	82
New York Knicks	37	45	.451	11.0	19‍–‍22	18‍–‍23	10–6	82
Boston Celtics	25	57	.305	23.0	16‍–‍25	9‍–‍32	5–11	82
Philadelphia 76ers	19	63	.232	29.0	10‍–‍31	9‍–‍32	5–11	82

Eastern Conference
#	Team	W	L	PCT	GB	GP
1	c-Indiana Pacers *	56	26	.683	–	82
2	y-Miami Heat *	54	28	.659	2.0	82
3	y-Toronto Raptors *	48	34	.585	8.0	82
4	x-Chicago Bulls	48	34	.585	8.0	82
5	x-Washington Wizards	44	38	.537	12.0	82
6	x-Brooklyn Nets	44	38	.537	12.0	82
7	x-Charlotte Bobcats	43	39	.524	13.0	82
8	x-Atlanta Hawks	38	44	.463	18.0	82
9	New York Knicks	37	45	.451	19.0	82
10	Cleveland Cavaliers	33	49	.402	23.0	82
11	Detroit Pistons	29	53	.354	27.0	82
12	Boston Celtics	25	57	.305	31.0	82
13	Orlando Magic	23	59	.280	33.0	82
14	Philadelphia 76ers	19	63	.232	37.0	82
15	Milwaukee Bucks	15	67	.183	41.0	82

== Playoffs ==
=== First round ===
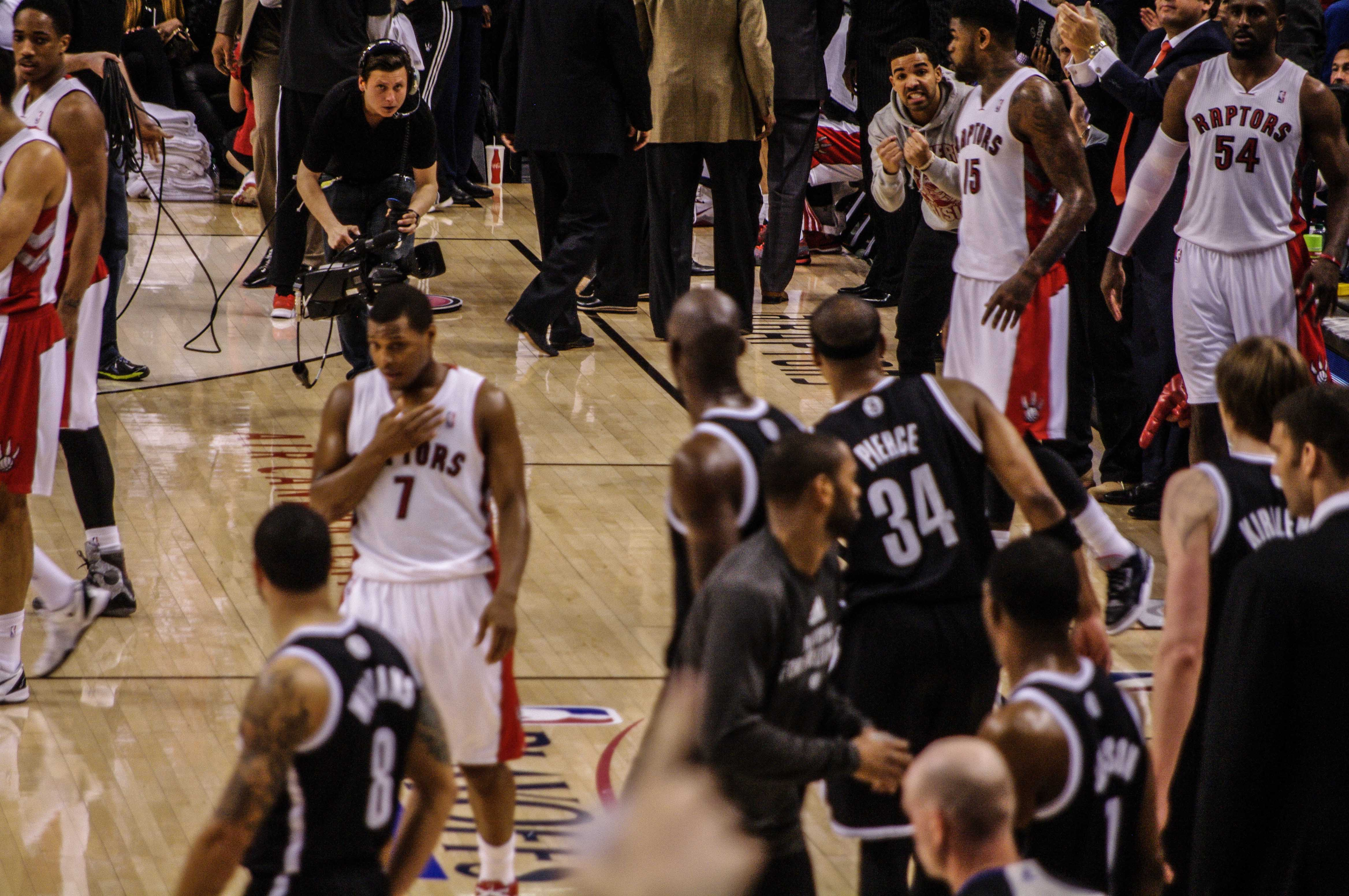
Game 2 of the First Round against the Toronto Raptors.

For the Nets, the 2014 NBA Playoffs began against division-rival Toronto Raptors. The series began on April 19, with the Nets winning Game 1, 94–87. The Raptors responded to the loss with a 100–95 win in Game 2 to even the series 1–1. To take the series lead once more, the Nets came up with a 102–98 victory in Game 3. In Game 4, the Raptors evened the series 2–2, as the Nets lost 79–87. The Nets trailed the series for the first time after a Game 5 loss, despite outscoring the Raptors by 20 points in the fourth quarter. After their disappointing loss in Game 5, the Nets fought for their season as they blew-out the Raptors in Game 6 with a 97–83 victory. The Nets moved on to the conference semifinals with a late game block by Paul Pierce against Raptors' guard Kyle Lowry for a 104–103 victory in the final Game 7.

=== Conference semifinals ===
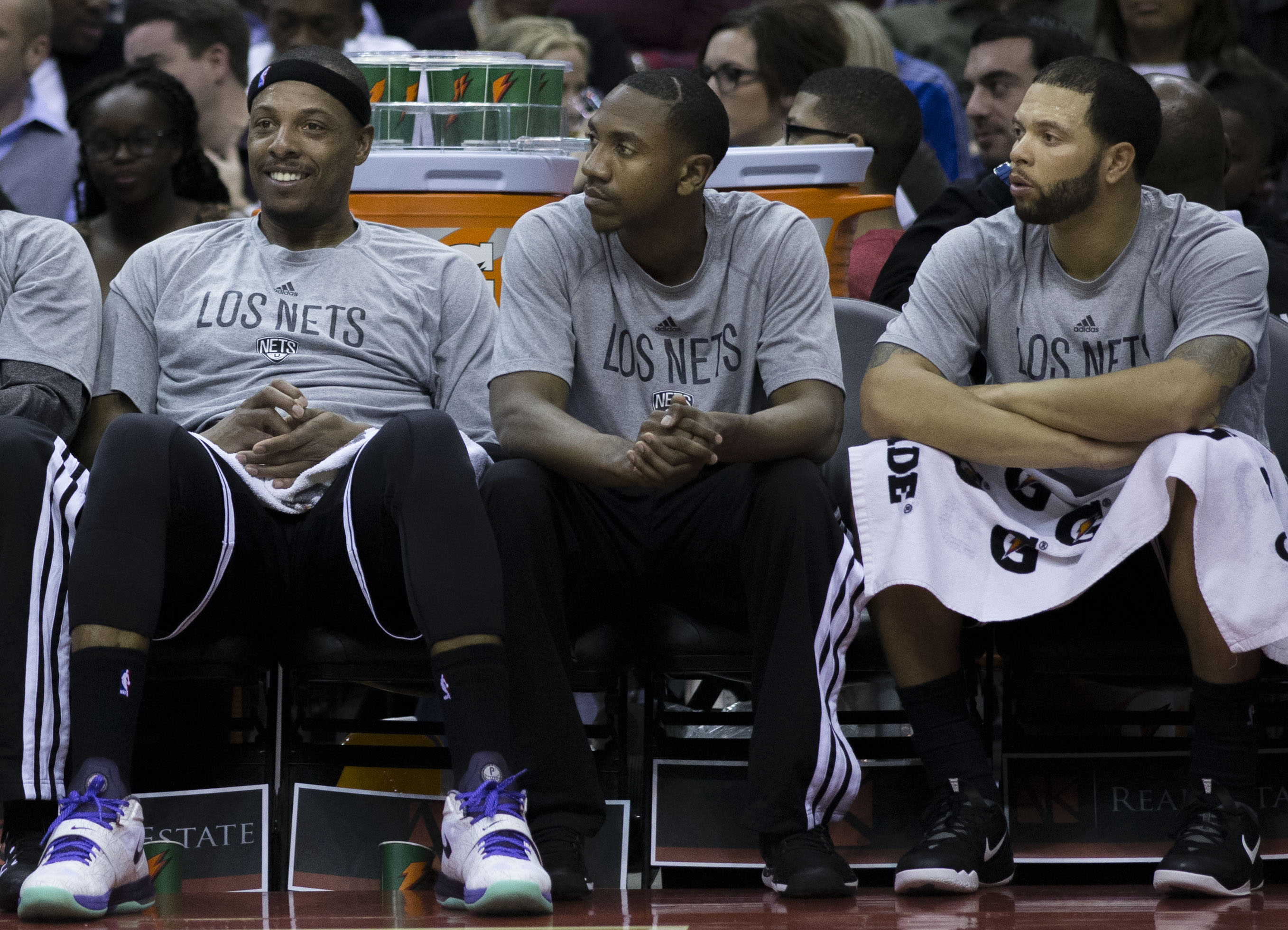
The Nets' season would end in a 1–4 series loss to the Miami Heat.

Going on to the conference semifinals, the Nets were going to meet the Miami Heat, the very team that they had swept in the regular season. In Game 1, the Nets had lost in a 21-point blowout. The Nets would lose Game 2, 82–94. Knowing they would go 0–3 in the series if they lose, the Nets relied on the three-point field goal to defeat the Heat. In Game 4, the Nets fell 1–3 in the series by losing by six points in a game where LeBron James scored a then playoff career-high 49 points. With the opportunity to take Game 5 to overtime, when the Nets were trailing the series 1–3, Joe Johnson had failed to attempt a game-tying shot, losing 96–94, thus ending their 2013–14 season.

== Game log ==
=== Summer League ===
2013 Summer League game log
Total: 0–5 (home: 0–3; road: 0–2)
Summer League: 0–5 (home: 0–3; road: 0–2)

Game	Date	Team	Score	High points	High rebounds	High assists	Location Attendance	Record
1	July 7	Detroit	L 67–76	Tyshawn Taylor (17)	Mason Plumlee (14)	Chris Wright (5)	Amway Center; N/A	0–1
2	July 8	@ Miami	L 86–93	Tyshawn Taylor (25)	Mason Plumlee (9)	Lighty & Shengelia (4)	Amway Center; N/A	0–2
3	July 10	Utah	L 69–98	Chris Wright (20)	James & Shengelia (5)	Damion James (4)	Amway Center; N/A	0–3
4	July 11	Houston	L 76–92	Three players (15)	Keith Benson (6)	Tyshawn Taylor (7)	Amway Center; N/A	0–4
5	July 12	@ Philadelphia	L 86–89	Plumlee & Wright (23)	Keith Benson (16)	Chris Wright (7)	Amway Center; N/A	0–5

2013–14 season schedule

=== Preseason ===
2013 pre-season game log
Total: 5–2 (home: 2–1; road: 3–1)
Pre-season: 5–2 (home: 2–1; road: 3–1)

Game	Date	Team	Score	High points	High rebounds	High assists	Location Attendance	Record
1	October 8	@ Washington	W 111–106 (OT)	Tyshawn Taylor (16)	Evans & Garnett (7)	Tyshawn Taylor (6)	Verizon Center; 9,743	1–0
2	October 12	Detroit	L 88–99	Andray Blatche (15)	Reggie Evans (5)	Shaun Livingston (7)	Barclays Center; 16,331	1–1
3	October 14	@ Philadelphia	W 127–97	Johnson & Teletović (21)	Reggie Evans (10)	Shaun Livingston (8)	Wells Fargo Center; 6,315	2–1
4	October 15	Boston	W 82–80	Brook Lopez (20)	Paul Pierce (10)	Paul Pierce (5)	Barclays Center; 15,554	3–1
5	October 17	Miami	W 86–62	Brook Lopez (14)	Reggie Evans (9)	Paul Pierce (7)	Barclays Center; 17,732	4–1
6	October 23	@ Boston	L 97–101	Tyshawn Taylor (15)	Mason Plumlee (9)	Shaun Livingston (5)	TD Garden; 15,865	4–2
7	October 25	@ Miami	W 108–87	Alan Anderson (17)	Mason Plumlee (10)	Joe Johnson (4)	American Airlines Arena; 19,600	5–2

2013–14 pre-season schedule

=== Regular season ===
2013–14 game log
Total: 44–38 (home: 28–13; road: 16–25)
October: 0–1 (home: 0–0; road: 0–1)

Game	Date	Team	Score	High points	High rebounds	High assists	Location Attendance	Record
1	October 30	@ Cleveland	L 94–98	Brook Lopez (21)	Kevin Garnett (10)	Deron Williams (9)	Quicken Loans Arena; 20,562	0–1

November : 5–11 (home: 2–4; road: 3–7)

Game	Date	Team	Score	High points	High rebounds	High assists	Location Attendance	Record
2	November 1	Miami	W 101–100	Johnson & Pierce (19)	Kevin Garnett (7)	Deron Williams (8)	Barclays Center; 17,732	1–1
3	November 3	@ Orlando	L 86–107	Brook Lopez (21)	Paul Pierce (7)	Livingston & Williams (7)	Amway Center; 15,297	1–2
4	November 5	Utah	W 104–88	Brook Lopez (27)	Brook Lopez (7)	Deron Williams (8)	Barclays Center; 17,732	2–2
5	November 8	@ Washington	L 108–112 (OT)	Brook Lopez (23)	Andray Blatche (13)	Joe Johnson (4)	Verizon Center; 17,215	2–3
6	November 9	Indiana	L 91–96	Johnson & Williams (17)	Garnett & Pierce (8)	Deron Williams (10)	Barclays Center; 17,732	2–4
7	November 13	@ Sacramento	L 86–107	Brook Lopez (16)	Lopez & Pierce (9)	Deron Williams (7)	Sleep Train Arena; 15,122	2–5
8	November 15	@ Phoenix	W 100–98 (OT)	Brook Lopez (27)	Kevin Garnett (14)	Shaun Livingston (6)	US Airways Center; 15,984	3–5
9	November 16	@ L.A. Clippers	L 103–110	Blatche & Plumlee (19)	Reggie Evans (11)	Joe Johnson (6)	Staples Center; 19,349	3–6
10	November 18	Portland	L 98–108	Shaun Livingston (23)	Reggie Evans (9)	Joe Johnson (3)	Barclays Center; 17,732	3–7
11	November 20	@ Charlotte	L 91–95	Andray Blatche (25)	Kevin Garnett (8)	Shaun Livingston (5)	Time Warner Cable Arena; 13,843	3–8
12	November 22	@ Minnesota	L 81–111	Andray Blatche (16)	Kevin Garnett (8)	Joe Johnson (4)	Target Center; 15,551	3–9
13	November 24	Detroit	L 97–109	Joe Johnson (34)	Kevin Garnett (9)	Shaun Livingston (7)	Barclays Center; 17,732	3–10
14	November 26	@ Toronto	W 102–100	Andray Blatche (24)	Kevin Garnett (6)	Shaun Livingston (7)	Air Canada Centre; 16,421	4–10
15	November 27	L.A. Lakers	L 94–99	Joe Johnson (18)	Kevin Garnett (9)	Paul Pierce (5)	Barclays Center; 17,732	4–11
16	November 29	@ Houston	L 95–114	Mirza Teletović (18)	Mirza Teletović (13)	Tyshawn Taylor (12)	Toyota Center; 18,138	4–12
17	November 30	@ Memphis	W 97–88	Joe Johnson (26)	Brook Lopez (9)	Joe Johnson (6)	FedExForum; 17,012	5–12

December : 5–9 (home: 4–5; road: 1–4)

Game	Date	Team	Score	High points	High rebounds	High assists	Location Attendance	Record
18	December 3	Denver	L 87–111	Joe Johnson (22)	Kevin Garnett (6)	Shaun Livingston (4)	Barclays Center; 17,732	5–13
19	December 5	New York	L 83–113	Brook Lopez (24)	Brook Lopez (9)	Andray Blatche (3)	Barclays Center; 17,732	5–14
20	December 7	@ Milwaukee	W 90–82	Brook Lopez (32)	Kevin Garnett (8)	Joe Johnson (5)	BMO Harris Bradley Center; 14,963	6–14
21	December 10	Boston	W 104–96	Deron Williams (25)	Kevin Garnett (9)	Deron Williams (7)	Barclays Center; 15,738	7–14
22	December 12	L.A. Clippers	W 102–93	Joe Johnson (21)	Andray Blatche (9)	Paul Pierce (5)	Barclays Center; 15,563	8–14
23	December 13	@ Detroit	L 99–103	Deron Williams (22)	Andray Blatche (12)	Deron Williams (9)	Palace of Auburn Hills; 15,159	8–15
24	December 16	Philadelphia	W 130–94	Joe Johnson (37)	Mason Plumlee (8)	Deron Williams (13)	Barclays Center; 16,733	9–15
25	December 18	Washington	L 107–113	Paul Pierce (27)	Joe Johnson (7)	Deron Williams (13)	Barclays Center; 16,187	9–16
26	December 20	@ Philadelphia	L 120–121 (OT)	Alan Anderson (26)	Paul Pierce (10)	Deron Williams (14)	Wells Fargo Center; 15,267	9–17
27	December 23	Indiana	L 86–103	Joe Johnson (17)	Andray Blatche (7)	Deron Williams (8)	Barclays Center; 17,732	9–18
28	December 25	Chicago	L 78–95	Deron Williams (18)	Reggie Evans (13)	Deron Williams (4)	Barclays Center; 17,732	9–19
29	December 27	Milwaukee	W 104–93	Shaun Livingston (20)	Reggie Evans (13)	Shaun Livingston (6)	Barclays Center; 17,732	10–19
30	December 28	@ Indiana	L 91–105	Paul Pierce (18)	Kevin Garnett (7)	Deron Williams (6)	Bankers Life Fieldhouse; 18,165	10–20
31	December 31	@ San Antonio	L 92–113	Livingston & Plumlee (15)	Mason Plumlee (13)	Deron Williams (6)	AT&T Center; 17,409	10–21

January : 10–3 (home: 6–2; road: 4–1)

Game	Date	Team	Score	High points	High rebounds	High assists	Location Attendance	Record
32	January 2	@ Oklahoma City	W 95–93	Deron Williams (29)	Kevin Garnett (7)	Livingston & Williams (4)	Chesapeake Energy Arena; 18,203	11–21
33	January 4	Cleveland	W 89–82	Deron Williams (21)	Reggie Evans (11)	Deron Williams (6)	Barclays Center; 17,732	12–21
34	January 6	Atlanta	W 91–86	Joe Johnson (23)	Kevin Garnett (10)	Johnson & Kirilenko (4)	Barclays Center; 15,326	13–21
35	January 8	Golden State	W 102–98	Joe Johnson (27)	Mirza Teletović (10)	Andray Blatche (3)	Barclays Center; 17,732	14–21
36	January 10	Miami	W 104–95 (2OT)	Joe Johnson (32)	Shaun Livingston (11)	Johnson & Livingston (5)	Barclays Center; 17,732	15–21
37	January 11	@ Toronto	L 80–96	Paul Pierce (15)	Joe Johnson (6)	Joe Johnson (6)	Air Canada Centre; 19,800	15–22
38	January 16	@ Atlanta	W 127–110	Joe Johnson (29)	Andray Blatche (14)	Jason Terry (7)	The O2 Arena; 18,689	16–22
39	January 20	@ New York	W 103–80	Joe Johnson (25)	Andray Blatche (12)	Johnson & Pierce (5)	Madison Square Garden; 19,812	17–22
40	January 21	Orlando	W 101–90	Andray Blatche (18)	Paul Pierce (6)	Deron Williams (9)	Barclays Center; 15,482	18–22
41	January 24	Dallas	W 107–106	Mirza Teletović (34)	Kevin Garnett (11)	Deron Williams (11)	Barclays Center; 16,110	19–22
42	January 26	@ Boston	W 85–79	Andray Blatche (17)	Shaun Livingston (8)	Deron Williams (7)	TD Garden; 18,624	20–22
43	January 27	Toronto	L 103–104	Paul Pierce (33)	Kevin Garnett (11)	Deron Williams (11)	Barclays Center; 15,790	20–23
44	January 31	Oklahoma City	L 95–120	Shaun Livingston (16)	Paul Pierce (5)	Mirza Teletović (4)	Barclays Center; 17,732	20–24

February : 7–5 (home: 4–0; road: 3–5)

Game	Date	Team	Score	High points	High rebounds	High assists	Location Attendance	Record
45	February 1	@ Indiana	L 96–97	Shaun Livingston (24)	Kevin Garnett (10)	Deron Williams (6)	Bankers Life Fieldhouse; 18,165	20–25
46	February 3	Philadelphia	W 108–102	Paul Pierce (25)	Kevin Garnett (7)	Shaun Livingston (8)	Barclays Center; 16,727	21–25
47	February 6	San Antonio	W 103–89	Alan Anderson (22)	Kevin Garnett (9)	Deron Williams (8)	Barclays Center; 17,732	22–25
48	February 7	@ Detroit	L 95–111	Jason Terry (18)	Reggie Evans (9)	Marquis Teague (4)	Palace of Auburn Hills; 13,727	22–26
49	February 9	New Orleans	W 93–81	Mason Plumlee (22)	Mason Plumlee (13)	Deron Williams (6)	Barclays Center; 17,732	23–26
50	February 12	Charlotte	W 105–89	Paul Pierce (25)	Mirza Teletović (8)	Deron Williams (7)	Barclays Center; 16,862	24–26
51	February 13	@ Chicago	L 76–92	Paul Pierce (15)	Kevin Garnett (7)	Deron Williams (5)	United Center; 21,500	24–27
All-Star Break
52	February 19	@ Utah	W 105–99	Joe Johnson (27)	Blatche & Pierce (6)	Livingston & Williams (7)	EnergySolutions Arena; 17,386	25–27
53	February 22	@ Golden State	L 86–93	Deron Williams (20)	Andrei Kirilenko (9)	Deron Williams (6)	Oracle Arena; 19,596	25–28
54	February 23	@ L.A. Lakers	W 108–102	Deron Williams (30)	Andrei Kirilenko (10)	Joe Johnson (8)	Staples Center; 18,997	26–28
55	February 26	@ Portland	L 80–124	Deron Williams (12)	Kevin Garnett (7)	Anderson & Williams (3)	Moda Center; 20,015	26–29
56	February 27	@ Denver	W 112–89	Paul Pierce (18)	Andray Blatche (9)	Shaun Livingston (8)	Pepsi Center; 14,826	27–29

March : 12–4 (home: 9–0; road: 3–4)

Game	Date	Team	Score	High points	High rebounds	High assists	Location Attendance	Record
57	March 1	@ Milwaukee	W 107–98	Marcus Thornton (25)	Andray Blatche (13)	Kirilenko & Pierce (5)	BMO Harris Bradley Center; 14,081	28–29
58	March 3	Chicago	W 96–80	Deron Williams (20)	Paul Pierce (7)	Deron Williams (6)	Barclays Center; 17,732	29–29
59	March 5	Memphis	W 103–94	Joe Johnson (21)	Paul Pierce (8)	Deron Williams (7)	Barclays Center; 17,053	30–29
60	March 7	@ Boston	L 84–91	Joe Johnson (21)	Joe Johnson (7)	Deron Williams (4)	TD Garden; 18,195	30–30
61	March 9	Sacramento	W 104–89	Marcus Thornton (27)	Deron Williams (4)	Deron Williams (7)	Barclays Center; 17,732	31–30
62	March 10	Toronto	W 101–97	Livingston & Williams (18)	Mason Plumlee (8)	Deron Williams (5)	Barclays Center; 17,351	32–30
63	March 12	@ Miami	W 96–95	Paul Pierce (29)	Shaun Livingston (7)	Deron Williams (8)	American Airlines Arena; 19,616	33–30
64	March 15	@ Washington	L 94–101	Marcus Thornton (19)	Johnson & Williams (7)	Deron Williams (7)	Verizon Center; 20,356	33–31
65	March 17	Phoenix	W 108–95	Deron Williams (28)	Mason Plumlee (11)	Johnson & Livingston (5)	Barclays Center; 17,401	34–31
66	March 19	Charlotte	W 104–99	Deron Williams (25)	Joe Johnson (8)	Joe Johnson (8)	Barclays Center; 17,222	35–31
67	March 21	Boston	W 114–98	Joe Johnson (27)	Shaun Livingston (7)	Livingston & Williams (6)	Barclays Center; 17,732	36–31
68	March 23	@ Dallas	W 107–104 (OT)	Joe Johnson (22)	Three players (7)	Four players (3)	American Airlines Center; 19,603	37–31
69	March 24	@ New Orleans	L 104–109 (OT)	Paul Pierce (24)	Mason Plumlee (11)	Deron Williams (5)	Smoothie King Center; 14,599	37–32
70	March 26	@ Charlotte	L 111–116 (OT)	Deron Williams (29)	Andray Blatche (7)	Livingston & Williams (7)	Time Warner Cable Arena; 15,943	37–33
71	March 28	Cleveland	W 108–97	Paul Pierce (22)	Mirza Teletović (10)	Shaun Livingston (6)	Barclays Center; 17,732	38–33
72	March 30	Minnesota	W 114–99	Paul Pierce (22)	Mason Plumlee (8)	Deron Williams (5)	Barclays Center; 17,732	39–33

April : 5–5 (home: 3–2; road: 2–3)

Game	Date	Team	Score	High points	High rebounds	High assists	Location Attendance	Record
73	April 1	Houston	W 105–96	Joe Johnson (32)	Mirza Teletović (7)	Deron Williams (6)	Barclays Center; 17,732	40–33
74	April 2	@ New York	L 81–110	Joe Johnson (16)	Pierce & Plumlee (4)	Shaun Livingston (3)	Madison Square Garden; 19,812	40–34
75	April 4	Detroit	W 116–104	Shaun Livingston (23)	Jason Collins (5)	Deron Williams (10)	Barclays Center; 16,754	41–34
76	April 5	@ Philadelphia	W 105–101	Deron Williams (19)	Mason Plumlee (7)	Deron Williams (9)	Wells Fargo Center; 16,133	42–34
77	April 8	@ Miami	W 88–87	Joe Johnson (19)	Mason Plumlee (8)	Deron Williams (6)	American Airlines Arena; 19,600	43–34
78	April 9	@ Orlando	L 111–115	Joe Johnson (31)	Mirza Teletović (9)	Kevin Garnett (6)	Amway Center; 16,085	43–35
79	April 11	Atlanta	L 88–93	Mason Plumlee (17)	Kevin Garnett (10)	Gutierrez & Pierce (4)	Barclays Center; 17,732	43–36
80	April 13	Orlando	W 97–88	Mirza Teletović (20)	Mason Plumlee (11)	Deron Williams (5)	Barclays Center; 17,732	44–36
81	April 15	New York	L 98–109	Marcus Thornton (24)	Mason Plumlee (9)	Five players (4)	Barclays Center; 17,732	44–37
82	April 16	@ Cleveland	L 85–114	Marcus Thornton (20)	Andray Blatche (12)	Mason Plumlee (6)	Quicken Loans Arena; 19,842	44–38

2013–14 season schedule

=== Playoffs ===
2014 playoff game log
Total: 5–7 (home: 3–2; road: 2–5)
First Round: 4–3 (home: 2–1; road: 2–2)

Game	Date	Team	Score	High points	High rebounds	High assists	Location Attendance	Series
1	April 19	@ Toronto	W 94–87	Johnson & Williams (24)	Garnett & Johnson (8)	Johnson & Pierce (4)	Air Canada Centre; 19,800	1–0
2	April 22	@ Toronto	L 95–100	Joe Johnson (18)	Pierce & Plumlee (6)	Livingston & Williams (5)	Air Canada Centre; 20,382	1–1
3	April 25	Toronto	W 102–98	Joe Johnson (29)	Shaun Livingston (6)	Deron Williams (8)	Barclays Center; 17,732	2–1
4	April 27	Toronto	L 79–87	Paul Pierce (22)	Andray Blatche (7)	Deron Williams (6)	Barclays Center; 17,732	2–2
5	April 30	@ Toronto	L 113–115	Joe Johnson (30)	Mirza Teletović (7)	Deron Williams (9)	Air Canada Centre; 20,393	2–3
6	May 2	Toronto	W 97–83	Deron Williams (23)	Alan Anderson (9)	Deron Williams (4)	Barclays Center; 17,732	3–3
7	May 4	@ Toronto	W 104–103	Joe Johnson (26)	Kevin Garnett (11)	Johnson & Williams (4)	Air Canada Centre; 20,457	4–3

Conference Semifinals: 1–4 (home: 1–1; road: 0–3)

Game	Date	Team	Score	High points	High rebounds	High assists	Location Attendance	Series
1	May 6	@ Miami	L 86–107	Johnson & Williams (17)	Paul Pierce (6)	Livingston & Williams (3)	American Airlines Arena; 19,470	0–1
2	May 8	@ Miami	L 82–94	Mirza Teletović (20)	Kevin Garnett (12)	Deron Williams (6)	American Airlines Arena; 19,639	0–2
3	May 10	Miami	W 104–90	Joe Johnson (19)	Andray Blatche (10)	Deron Williams (11)	Barclays Center; 17,732	1–2
4	May 12	Miami	L 96–102	Joe Johnson (18)	Andray Blatche (8)	Deron Williams (7)	Barclays Center; 17,732	1–3
5	May 14	@ Miami	L 94–96	Joe Johnson (34)	Kevin Garnett (8)	Deron Williams (4)	American Airlines Arena; 19,615	1–4

2014 playoff schedule

== Player statistics ==
Statistics (Summer League, preseason, regular season, and postseason)

Legend
GP	Games played	GS	Games started	MPG	Minutes per game
FG%	Field-goal percentage	3P%	3-point field-goal percentage	FT%	Free-throw percentage
RPG	Rebounds per game	APG	Assists per game	SPG	Steals per game
BPG	Blocks per game	PPG	Points per game

=== Summer League ===
Brooklyn Nets statistics
Player	GP	GS	MPG	FG%	3P%	FT%	RPG	APG	SPG	BPG	PPG
Keith Benson	5	1	14.1	.429	.000	.900	5.2	0.0	0.20	0.40	6.6
Jamelle Hagins	4	1	10.1	.333	.000	.000	2.0	0.0	0.00	0.50	1.0
Lawrence Hill	1	0	17.7	.200	.000	.000	7.0	1.0	3.00	1.00	2.0
Damion James	4	1	24.9	.462	.000	1.000	4.5	1.3	1.25	0.75	10.3
Matt Janning	2	2	21.4	.400	.333	.000	0.5	1.0	1.50	1.00	5.0
David Lighty	3	2	26.9	.375	.500	.875	2.0	2.3	0.00	0.00	7.7
Mason Plumlee	5	5	29.4	.458	.000	.688	7.0	2.4	0.80	0.40	13.2
Carleton Scott	4	2	25.9	.345	.455	.000	2.8	0.3	0.75	0.75	7.5
Tornike Shengelia	5	5	26.4	.350	.154	.571	3.8	3.2	2.40	1.00	7.6
Dominique Sutton	2	1	12.7	.000	.000	.833	4.5	0.5	1.50	0.00	2.5
Tyshawn Taylor	4	4	30.1	.386	.100	.846	3.3	3.5	2.25	0.00	16.8
Chris Wright	5	1	24.1	.462	.333	.800	2.6	3.2	0.60	0.00	13.0
Totals	5	—	—	.403	.293	.776	33.2	15.0	9.20	3.60	76.8

Source: RealGM Basketball

=== Preseason ===
Brooklyn Nets statistics
Player	GP	GS	MPG	FG%	3P%	FT%	RPG	APG	SPG	BPG	PPG
Alan Anderson	7	2	22.4	.469	.444	.952	2.4	0.7	0.57	0.14	10.6
Andray Blatche	7	3	22.9	.500	.273	.667	4.1	1.4	0.86	1.00	12.7
Jorge Gutierrez	5	0	12.8	.364	.000	.500	3.0	0.8	0.60	0.00	1.8
Joe Johnson	6	6	22.3	.435	.318	1.000	2.2	2.8	0.67	0.00	9.0
Andrei Kirilenko	2	0	22.0	.625	1.000	.500	3.5	3.0	3.50	2.00	7.5
Shaun Livingston	7	6	20.9	.613	.000	.857	3.3	4.4	1.00	0.14	7.1
Brook Lopez	6	6	20.2	.579	.000	.583	3.2	0.7	0.83	2.00	13.3
Paul Pierce	5	5	19.8	.400	.357	.750	5.2	3.6	0.60	0.40	6.8
Mason Plumlee	7	1	20.1	.409	.000	.593	6.1	1.1	0.86	0.86	4.9
Mirza Teletović	7	0	21.7	.338	.304	.786	3.6	1.7	0.43	0.14	10.4
Deron Williams	1	1	10.0	.800	.750	.000	0.0	2.0	1.00	0.00	11.0
Totals	7	—	—								

=== Regular season ===
Brooklyn Nets statistics
Player	GP	GS	MPG	FG%	3P%	FT%	RPG	APG	SPG	BPG	PPG
Alan Anderson	78	26	22.7	.400	.339	.780	2.2	1.0	0.62	0.14	7.2
Andray Blatche	73	7	22.2	.476	.278	.742	5.3	1.5	1.03	0.52	11.2
Jason Collins	22	1	7.8	.458	.000	.750	0.9	0.2	0.36	0.05	1.1
Reggie Evans (Note: Statistics with the Brooklyn Nets; Evans traded to Sacramento Kings on February 19, 2014.)	30	6	13.3	.390	.000	.540	5.0	0.2	0.43	0.07	2.7
Kevin Garnett	54	54	20.5	.441	.000	.809	6.6	1.5	0.80	0.74	6.5
Jorge Gutierrez	15	2	16.3	.463	.250	.750	1.5	2.0	0.67	0.07	4.1
Joe Johnson	79	79	32.6	.454	.401	.815	3.4	2.7	0.59	0.13	15.8
Andrei Kirilenko	45	4	19.0	.513	.200	.513	3.2	1.6	0.89	0.42	5.0
Shaun Livingston	76	54	26.0	.483	.167	.827	3.2	3.2	1.22	0.41	8.3
Brook Lopez	17	17	31.4	.563	.000	.817	6.0	0.9	0.53	1.76	20.7
Mason Plumlee	70	22	18.2	.659	.000	.626	4.4	0.9	0.70	0.79	7.4
Paul Pierce	75	68	28.0	.451	.373	.826	4.6	2.4	1.15	0.41	13.5
Tornike Shengelia (Note: Statistics with the Brooklyn Nets; Shengelia traded to Chicago Bulls on January 21, 2014.)	17	0	8.1	.458	.000	.380	0.8	0.7	0.12	0.06	1.5
Tyshawn Taylor	23	3	11.7	.341	.250	.800	0.7	1.6	0.52	0.04	3.9
Marquis Teague (Note: Statistics with the Brooklyn Nets; Teague traded from Chicago Bulls on January 21, 2014.)	21	1	9.6	.415	.375	.789	1.0	1.4	0.38	0.05	3.0
Mirza Teletović	72	7	19.4	.418	.390	.710	3.7	0.8	0.40	0.32	8.6
Jason Terry (Note: Statistics with the Brooklyn Nets; Terry traded to Sacramento Kings on February 19, 2014.)	35	0	16.3	.362	.379	.670	1.1	1.6	0.37	0.00	4.5
Marcus Thornton (Note: Statistics with the Brooklyn Nets; Thornton traded from Sacramento Kings on February 19, 2014.)	26	1	23.8	.414	.380	.800	2.8	1.2	1.04	0.12	12.3
Deron Williams	64	58	32.2	.450	.366	.801	2.6	6.1	1.45	0.20	14.3
Totals	82	—	—	.459	.369	.753	38.1	20.9	8.60	3.79	98.5

Sources: Basketball Reference and ESPN

=== Postseason ===
==== First round ====
Brooklyn Nets statistics
Player	GP	GS	MPG	FG%	3P%	FT%	RPG	APG	SPG	BPG	PPG
Alan Anderson	7	2	22.4	.395	.294	.625	3.1	1.4	1.29	0.00	5.7
Andray Blatche	7	0	15.6	.471	.294	.818	5.3	0.4	0.86	0.29	7.1
Kevin Garnett	7	7	20.0	.564	.000	.714	5.4	1.4	0.57	0.71	8.4
Joe Johnson	7	7	40.9	.523	.391	.824	3.6	2.7	0.57	0.29	21.9
Andrei Kirilenko	6	0	12.0	.286	.000	.750	2.0	0.8	1.33	0.33	1.2
Shaun Livingston	7	5	23.9	.523	.000	.722	3.9	3.1	0.14	0.29	8.4
Paul Pierce	7	7	30.0	.465	.333	.850	4.4	2.4	1.43	0.57	13.4
Mason Plumlee	7	0	12.4	.455	.000	.444	2.4	0.1	0.29	0.86	2.6
Mirza Teletović	7	0	18.0	.408	.250	.667	3.6	0.1	0.43	0.14	7.4
Marcus Thornton	6	0	12.2	.345	.286	.714	1.8	0.2	0.33	0.00	5.7
Deron Williams	7	7	36.3	.419	.294	.780	2.1	5.6	1.43	0.14	16.9
Totals	7	—	—	.461	.303	.743	37.1	18.3	8.43	3.57	97.7

Source: Basketball Reference

==== Conference semifinals ====
Brooklyn Nets statistics
Player	GP	GS	MPG	FG%	3P%	FT%	RPG	APG	SPG	BPG	PPG
Alan Anderson	5	0	20.7	.417	.286	.700	2.0	1.0	0.2	0.0	6.2
Andray Blatche	5	0	12.6	.417	.000	.875	4.6	0.2	0.0	0.0	5.4
Kevin Garnett	5	5	21.9	.458	.000	1.000	7.6	1.2	1.0	0.0	4.8
Jorge Gutierrez	2	0	1.7	.000	.000	.500	0.5	0.0	0.0	0.0	1.0
Joe Johnson	5	5	36.7	.548	.433	.889	4.2	3.2	0.4	0.2	20.2
Andrei Kirilenko	4	0	18.2	.625	.000	.615	2.8	1.3	0.5	0.3	4.5
Shaun Livingston	5	5	31.7	.500	1.000	.737	3.0	3.6	0.8	0.6	11.4
Paul Pierce	5	5	31.7	.466	.400	.667	4.6	1.4	0.8	0.0	14.0
Mason Plumlee	3	0	9.2	.400	.000	.000	2.0	0.3	0.3	0.3	1.3
Mirza Teletović	5	0	18.8	.485	.458	.667	3.0	0.4	0.4	0.2	9.4
Marcus Thornton	4	0	12.8	.440	.143	.500	1.7	2.0	0.0	0.3	6.3
Deron Williams	5	5	34.9	.367	.421	1.000	4.6	6.2	0.6	0.2	11.2
Totals	5	—	—	.465	.393	.725	38.8	18.4	4.8	1.8	92.4

Source: Basketball Reference

==== Overall ====
Brooklyn Nets statistics
Player	GP	GS	MPG	FG%	3P%	FT%	RPG	APG	SPG	BPG	PPG
Alan Anderson	12	2	21.8	.403	.290	.667	2.7	1.3	0.83	0.00	5.9
Andray Blatche	12	0	14.3	.448	.000	.833	5.0	0.3	0.50	0.17	6.4
Kevin Garnett	12	12	20.8	.524	.000	.739	6.3	1.3	0.75	0.42	6.9
Jorge Gutierrez	2	0	1.5	.000	.000	.500	0.5	0.0	0.00	0.00	1.0
Joe Johnson	12	12	39.1	.533	.415	.837	3.8	2.9	0.50	0.25	21.2
Andrei Kirilenko	10	0	14.4	.467	.000	.647	2.3	1.0	1.00	0.30	2.5
Shaun Livingston	12	10	27.1	.512	1.000	.730	3.5	3.3	0.42	0.42	9.7
Paul Pierce	12	12	30.7	.465	.358	.781	4.5	2.0	1.17	0.33	13.7
Mason Plumlee	10	0	11.4	.438	.000	.444	2.3	0.2	0.30	0.70	2.2
Mirza Teletović	12	0	18.3	.439	.339	.667	3.3	0.3	0.42	0.17	8.3
Marcus Thornton	10	0	12.4	.389	.238	.667	1.9	0.3	0.20	0.10	5.9
Deron Williams	12	12	35.7	.395	.340	.800	3.2	5.8	1.08	0.17	14.5
Totals	12	—	—	.463	.342	.737	37.8	18.3	6.92	2.83	95.5

Sources: Basketball Reference and ESPN

== Injuries ==
Player	Duration		Injury type	Games missed
Player	Start	End	Injury type	Games missed
Andrei Kirilenko	October 30, 2013	October 30, 2013	Back spasms	1
Andrei Kirilenko	November 9, 2013	December 28, 2013	Back spasms	25
Kevin Garnett	November 16, 2013	November 16, 2013	Sprained right ankle	1
Brook Lopez	November 16, 2013	November 27, 2013	Sprained left ankle	7
Paul Pierce	November 16, 2013	November 16, 2013	Sore left groin	1
Deron Williams	November 16, 2013	November 18, 2013	Sprained left ankle	2
Jason Terry	November 22, 2013	December 20, 2013	Bruised left knee	15
Deron Williams	November 22, 2013	December 7, 2013	Sprained left ankle	9
Paul Pierce	November 30, 2013	November 30, 2013	Bruised right hand	1
Paul Pierce	December 3, 2013	December 7, 2013	Fractured right hand	3
Brook Lopez	December 13, 2013	December 16, 2013	Sprained left ankle	2
Brook Lopez	December 23, 2013	April 16, 2014	Fractured right foot	56
Tyshawn Taylor	December 31, 2013	December 31, 2013	Mild strain of right hamstring	1
Deron Williams	January 6, 2014	January 16, 2014	Sprained left ankle	5
Andrei Kirilenko	January 31, 2014	February 3, 2014	Sore left calf	3
Andray Blatche	February 1, 2014	February 3, 2014	Bruised left hip	2
Joe Johnson	February 3, 2014	February 3, 2014	Right patella tendinitis	1
Marcus Thornton	February 22, 2014	February 23, 2014	Food poisoning	2
Shaun Livingston	February 23, 2014	February 23, 2014	Bruised tailbone	1
Kevin Garnett	March 1, 2014	April 4, 2014	Back spasms	19
Andrei Kirilenko	March 10, 2014	March 12, 2014	Sprained right ankle	2
Andrei Kirilenko	March 24, 2014	April 2, 2014	Sprained left ankle	6
Marcus Thornton	March 26, 2014	March 26, 2014	Bruised lower back	1
Marcus Thornton	April 1, 2014	April 1, 2014	Bruised lower back	1
Andray Blatche	April 8, 2014	April 9, 2014	Illness	2
Shaun Livingston	April 9, 2014	April 16, 2014	Sprained right big toe	5
Paul Pierce	April 9, 2014	April 9, 2014	Right hip pointer	1
Alan Anderson	April 11, 2014	April 16, 2014	Sore abdominal muscle	3
Deron Williams	April 11, 2014	April 11, 2014	Right patella tendinitis	1
Joe Johnson	April 16, 2014	April 16, 2014	Sore right calf	1
Deron Williams	April 16, 2014	April 16, 2014	Right patella tendinitis	1

== Roster ==
2013–14 Brooklyn Nets roster
Players

Pos.	No.	Player	Height	Weight	DOB	From
G/F	6	Alan Anderson	6 ft 7 in (2.01 m)	220 lb (100 kg)	1982-10-16	Michigan State
F/C	0	Andray Blatche	6 ft 11 in (2.11 m)	260 lb (118 kg)	1986-08-22	Henninger HS (NY)
C	98	Jason Collins	7 ft 0 in (2.13 m)	255 lb (116 kg)	1978-12-02	Stanford
F/C	2	Kevin Garnett	6 ft 11 in (2.11 m)	253 lb (115 kg)	1976-05-19	Farragut HS (IL)
G	13	Jorge Gutiérrez	6 ft 3 in (1.91 m)	195 lb (88 kg)	1988-12-27	California
G	7	Joe Johnson	6 ft 7 in (2.01 m)	240 lb (109 kg)	1981-06-29	Arkansas
F	47	Andrei Kirilenko	6 ft 10 in (2.08 m)	235 lb (107 kg)	1981-02-18	Russia
G	14	Shaun Livingston	6 ft 7 in (2.01 m)	175 lb (79 kg)	1985-09-11	Peoria Central HS (IL)
C	11	Brook Lopez	7 ft 0 in (2.13 m)	265 lb (120 kg)	1988-04-01	Stanford
F	34	Paul Pierce	6 ft 7 in (2.01 m)	235 lb (107 kg)	1977-10-13	Kansas
F/C	1	Mason Plumlee	6 ft 11 in (2.11 m)	235 lb (107 kg)	1990-03-05	Duke
G	12	Marquis Teague	6 ft 2 in (1.88 m)	190 lb (86 kg)	1993-02-28	Kentucky
F	33	Mirza Teletović	6 ft 9 in (2.06 m)	255 lb (116 kg)	1985-09-17	Bosnia
G	10	Marcus Thornton	6 ft 4 in (1.93 m)	205 lb (93 kg)	1987-06-05	LSU
G	8	Deron Williams	6 ft 3 in (1.91 m)	209 lb (95 kg)	1984-06-26	Illinois

Coaches
Head coach
- Jason Kidd
Assistant(s)
- Lawrence Frank
- Eric Hughes
- Roy Rogers
- John Welch
- Joe Prunty
- Charles Klask

Legend
- (DP) Unsigned draft pick
- (FA) Free agent
- (S) Suspended
- Injured

Roster
Updated: March 17, 2014

== Transactions ==
=== Trades ===
July 12, 2013	To Brooklyn Nets (United States) Kevin Garnett (United States) Paul Pierce (United States) Jason Terry (United States) D. J. White	To Boston Celtics (United States) Keith Bogans (sign and trade) (United States) MarShon Brooks (United States) Kris Humphries (Canada) Kris Joseph (United States) Gerald Wallace 2014, 2016, & 2018 first-round draft picks Right to swap first-round draft picks in 2017
January 21, 2014	To Brooklyn Nets (United States) Marquis Teague	To Chicago Bulls (Georgia (country)) Tornike Shengelia
January 21, 2014	To Brooklyn Nets Draft rights to (Bosnia and Herzegovina) Edin Bavčić	To New Orleans Pelicans (United States) Tyshawn Taylor Cash considerations
February 19, 2014	To Brooklyn Nets (United States) Marcus Thornton	To Sacramento Kings (United States) Reggie Evans (United States) Jason Terry

=== Free agents ===
==== Re-signed ====
Player	Signed	Contract	Ref.
Andray Blatche	July 11, 2013	Two-year deal	
Jason Collins	March 5, 2014	10-day contract	
Jason Collins	March 15, 2014	Rest of 2013–14 season	
Jorge Gutierrez	March 17, 2014	10-day contract	
Jorge Gutierrez	March 28, 2014	Rest of 2013–14 season	
Player	Signed	Former team	Ref.
Jason Kidd (Note: Kidd was added to the team as its head coach.)	June 12, 2013	New York Knicks (as player)	
Shaun Livingston	July 11, 2013	Cleveland Cavaliers	
Andrei Kirilenko	July 12, 2013	Minnesota Timberwolves	
Alan Anderson	July 30, 2013	Toronto Raptors	
Gary Forbes	September 30, 2013	Zhejiang Lions (CBA)	
Jorge Gutierrez	September 30, 2013	Canton Charge (NBDL)	
Marko Jarić	September 30, 2013	Chicago Bulls	
Chris Johnson	September 30, 2013	Rio Grande Valley Vipers (NBDL)	
Adonis Thomas	October 18, 2013	Atlanta Hawks	
Jason Collins	February 23, 2014	Washington Wizards	
Jorge Gutierrez	March 6, 2014	Canton Charge (NBDL)	

==== Subtractions ====
Player	Reason left	Date	New team	Ref.
P. J. Carlesimo (Note: Carlesimo was the head coach prior to the expiration of his contract.)	Contract expired	June 12, 2013	TBD	
C. J. Watson	Free agency	July 12, 2013	Indiana Pacers	
Keith Bogans	Sign and trade	July 12, 2013	Boston Celtics	
D. J. White	Waived	July 18, 2013	Chicago Bulls	
Marko Jarić	Waived	October 15, 2013	TBD	
Gary Forbes	Waived	October 17, 2013	Springfield Armor (NBDL)	
Jorge Gutierrez	Waived	October 26, 2013	Canton Charge (NBDL)	
Chris Johnson	Waived	October 26, 2013	Rio Grande Valley Vipers (NBDL)	
Adonis Thomas	Waived	October 26, 2013	Atlanta Hawks	

== Awards ==
Player	Award	Date awarded	Ref.
Joe Johnson	NBA All-Star	January 30, 2014	
Jason Kidd	Coach of the Month, January	February 3, 2014	
Joe Johnson	Player of the Week, Mar. 17 – Mar. 23	March 24, 2014	
Jason Kidd	Coach of the Month, March	April 1, 2014	
Mason Plumlee	NBA All-Rookie Team	May 22, 2014	

== See also ==
- 2013–14 NBA season
- 2014 NBA playoffs
