= 2013–14 Toronto Raptors season =

NBA professional basketball team season

- Division champions
- Head coach: Dwane Casey
- Owners: Maple Leaf Sports & Entertainment
- Arena: Air Canada Centre

Results
- Record: 48–34 (.585)
- Place: Division: 1st (Atlantic); Conference: 3rd (Eastern)
- Playoff finish: First Round (lost to Nets 3–4)
- Stats at Basketball Reference

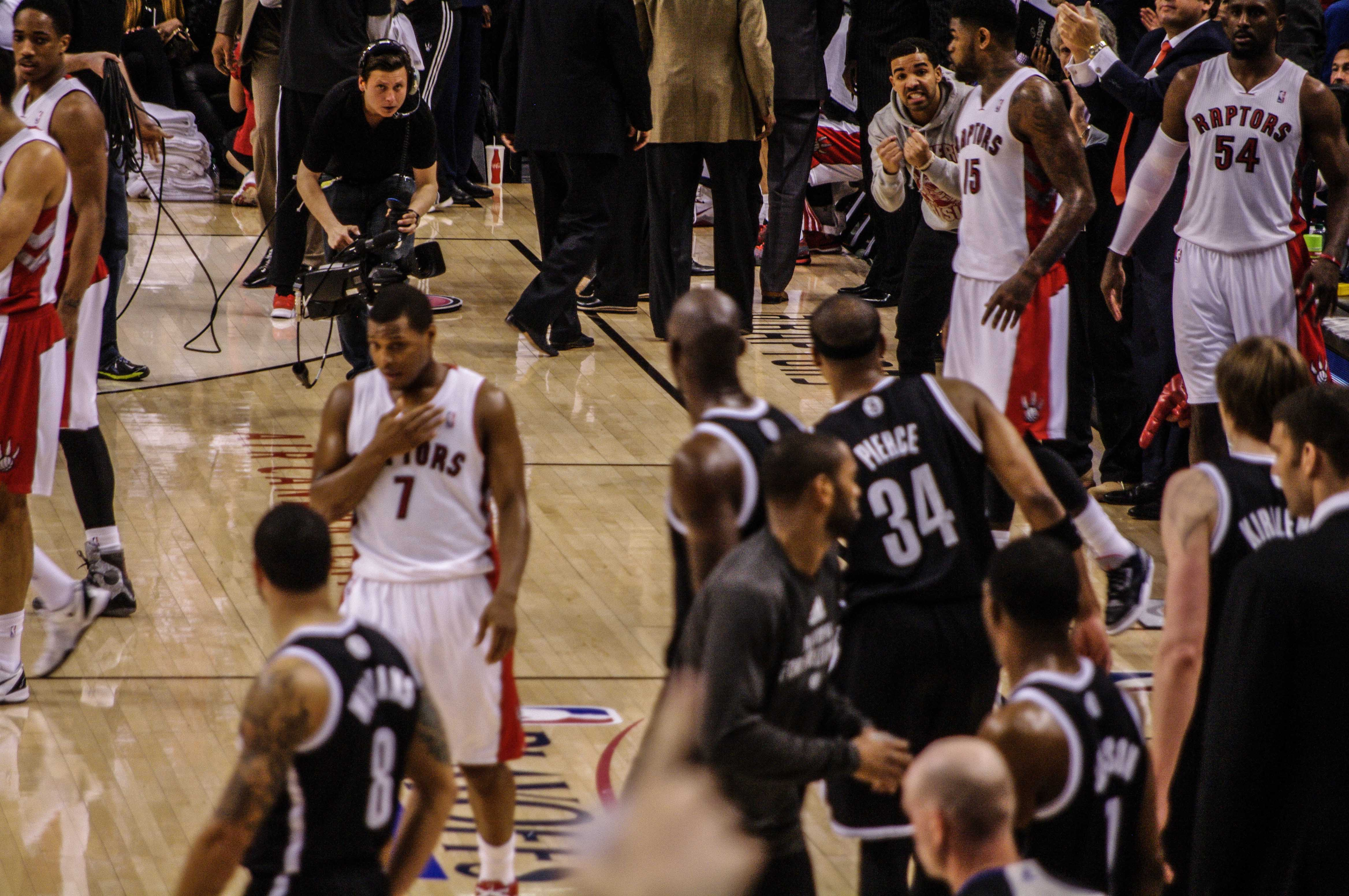
Nets vs Raptors, 2014 playoffs

The 2013–14 Toronto Raptors season is the 19th season of the franchise in the National Basketball Association (NBA). In the offseason, they traded Andrea Bargnani away to the New York Knicks for a 2016 first-round draft pick, a 2014 second-round draft pick, a 2017 second-round draft pick, Steve Novak, Quentin Richardson and Marcus Camby. The Raptors were not expected to make the 2014 playoffs however, with a weak Atlantic Division they found themselves as contenders for the Atlantic Division title despite an early losing record. On December 9, 2013, the Raptors traded Rudy Gay, Quincy Acy, and Aaron Gray to the Sacramento Kings for John Salmons, Greivis Vásquez, Patrick Patterson, and Chuck Hayes. The Rudy Gay trade was marked as a turning point for the Raptors as they went on a 10–2 run from a 6–12 record maintaining their division lead and finishing the season with a 48–34 record, their best in franchise history at that time, qualifying for the playoffs for the first time since 2008. The record consisted of a 26–15 home record, their best since 2001, and a 22-19 road record, their best in franchise history at that time. They also clinched the Atlantic Division title and the No. 3 seed for the first time since 2007. However, the Raptors were eliminated in the first round by the 6-seed Brooklyn Nets led by Paul Pierce and Kevin Garnett in an intense seven game first round series.

== Key dates ==
- June 27: The 2013 NBA draft took place at the Barclays Center in Brooklyn, New York, however the Raptors did not have any selections to make.

== Pre-season ==
2013 pre-season game log
Total: 6–2 (home: 4–1; road: 2–1)
Pre-season: 6–2 (home: 4–1; road: 2–1)

Game	Date	Team	Score	High points	High rebounds	High assists	Location Attendance	Record
1	October 7	@ Boston	W 97–89	Gay & Hansbrough (17)	Jonas Valančiūnas (10)	Kyle Lowry (5)	TD Garden (16,424)	1–0
2	October 9	Minnesota	L 89–101	DeMar DeRozan (17)	Tyler Hansbrough (7)	Kyle Lowry (4)	Air Canada Centre (17,261)	1–1
3	October 11	New York	W 100–91	DeMar DeRozan (20)	Rudy Gay (6)	DeRozan & Buycks (2)	Air Canada Centre (15,357)	2–1
4	October 12	@ Minnesota	W 104–97	Austin Daye (12)	Amir Johnson (7)	Dwight Buycks (7)	Target Center (10,106)	3–1
5	October 16	Boston	W 99–97	Terrence Ross (19)	Quincy Acy (8)	Dwight Buycks (5)	Air Canada Centre (13,331)	4–1
6	October 21	New York	W 123–120 (2OT)	Terrence Ross (27)	Jonas Valančiūnas (9)	Gay, Valančiūnas, Lowry, Fields, Buycks, Stone (3)	Air Canada Centre (15,701)	5–1
7	October 23	Memphis	W 108–72	DeMar DeRozan (21)	Jonas Valančiūnas (9)	Kyle Lowry (10)	Air Canada Centre (14,421)	6–1
8	October 25	@ Milwaukee	L 9–14	Rudy Gay (6)	D. J. Augustin (2)	DeMar DeRozan (1)	BMO Harris Bradley Center	6–2

2013–14 season schedule

== Roster ==
2013–14 Toronto Raptors roster
Players

Pos.	No.	Player	Height	Weight	DOB	From
G	13	Dwight Buycks	6 ft 3 in (1.91 m)	190 lb (86 kg)	1989–03–06	Marquette
G	3	Nando de Colo	6 ft 5 in (1.96 m)	200 lb (91 kg)	1987–06–23	France
G/F	10	DeMar DeRozan	6 ft 7 in (2.01 m)	216 lb (98 kg)	1989–08–07	USC
G/F	2	Landry Fields	6 ft 7 in (2.01 m)	215 lb (98 kg)	1988–06–27	Stanford
F/C	50	Tyler Hansbrough	6 ft 9 in (2.06 m)	250 lb (113 kg)	1985–11–03	North Carolina
F/C	44	Chuck Hayes	6 ft 6 in (1.98 m)	250 lb (113 kg)	1983–06–11	Kentucky
F/C	15	Amir Johnson	6 ft 9 in (2.06 m)	210 lb (95 kg)	1987–05–01	Westchester HS (CA)
G	7	Kyle Lowry	6 ft 0 in (1.83 m)	205 lb (93 kg)	1986–03–25	Villanova
F	16	Steve Novak	6 ft 10 in (2.08 m)	235 lb (107 kg)	1983–06–13	Marquette
F/C	54	Patrick Patterson	6 ft 9 in (2.06 m)	235 lb (107 kg)	1989–03–14	Kentucky
G/F	31	Terrence Ross	6 ft 6 in (1.98 m)	195 lb (88 kg)	1991–02–05	Washington
G/F	25	John Salmons	6 ft 6 in (1.98 m)	207 lb (94 kg)	1979–12–12	Miami (FL)
G	77	Julyan Stone	6 ft 6 in (1.98 m)	200 lb (91 kg)	1988–12–07	UTEP
C	17	Jonas Valančiūnas	6 ft 11 in (2.11 m)	231 lb (105 kg)	1992–05–06	Lithuania
G	21	Greivis Vásquez	6 ft 6 in (1.98 m)	211 lb (96 kg)	1987–01–16	Maryland

Coaches
Head coach
- Dwane Casey
Assistant(s)
- Bill Bayno
- Nick Nurse
- Jama Mahlalela
- Alex McKechnie
- Jesse Mermuys
- Tom Sterner

Legend
- (DP) Unsigned draft pick
- (FA) Free agent
- (S) Suspended
- (DL) On assignment to
  D-League affiliate
- Injured

Roster
Updated: 2014–03–09

== Regular season ==
=== Game log ===
2013–14 game log
Total: 48–34 (home: 26–15; road: 22–19)
October: 1–0 (home: 1–0; road: 0–0)

Game	Date	Team	Score	High points	High rebounds	High assists	Location Attendance	Record
1	October 30	Boston	W 93–87	Rudy Gay (19)	Tyler Hansbrough (12)	Kyle Lowry (8)	Air Canada Centre (20,155)	1–0

November : 5–9 (home: 2–5; road: 3–4)

Game	Date	Team	Score	High points	High rebounds	High assists	Location Attendance	Record
2	November 1	@ Atlanta	L 95–102	DeMar DeRozan (31)	Landry Fields (9)	Lowry & Augustin (4)	Philips Arena (18,118)	1–1
3	November 2	@ Milwaukee	W 97–90	Rudy Gay (18)	Rudy Gay (15)	DeMar DeRozan (5)	BMO Harris Bradley Center (16,046)	2–1
4	November 5	Miami	L 95–104	DeMar DeRozan (21)	Rudy Gay (10)	Kyle Lowry (5)	Air Canada Centre (18,470)	2–2
5	November 6	@ Charlotte	L 90–92	Rudy Gay (20)	Jonas Valančiūnas (10)	Kyle Lowry (6)	Time Warner Cable Arena (11,118)	2–3
6	November 8	@ Indiana	L 84–91	Rudy Gay (30)	Amir Johnson (10)	Kyle Lowry (8)	Bankers Life Fieldhouse (13,316)	2–4
7	November 9	Utah	W 115–91	Tyler Hansbrough (23)	Amir Johnson (11)	Rudy Gay (5)	Air Canada Centre (17,211)	3–4
8	November 11	@ Houston	L 104–110 (2OT)	Rudy Gay (29)	Jonas Valančiūnas (13)	Jonas Valančiūnas (3)	Toyota Center (18,134)	3–5
9	November 13	@ Memphis	W 103–87	Rudy Gay (23)	Jonas Valančiūnas (7)	Kyle Lowry (6)	FedExForum (15,971)	4–5
10	November 15	Chicago	L 80–96	DeMar DeRozan (37)	Rudy Gay (9)	Kyle Lowry (8)	Air Canada Centre (19,800)	4–6
11	November 17	Portland	L 110–118 (OT)	Rudy Gay (30)	Rudy Gay (10)	Kyle Lowry (10)	Air Canada Centre (17,945)	4–7
12	November 20	@ Philadelphia	W 108–98	DeMar DeRozan (33)	Gay & Hansbrough (8)	Kyle Lowry (10)	Wells Fargo Center (10,787)	5–7
13	November 22	Washington	W 96–88	DeRozan & Gay (17)	Jonas Valančiūnas (13)	Kyle Lowry (9)	Air Canada Centre (18,671)	6–7
14	November 26	Brooklyn	L 100–102	DeMar DeRozan (27)	Hansbrough & Valančiūnas (7)	Kyle Lowry (6)	Air Canada Centre (16,421)	6–8
15	November 29	Miami	L 83–90	DeMar DeRozan (25)	Tyler Hansbrough (12)	Kyle Lowry (6)	Air Canada Centre (18,290)	6–9

December: 8–6 (home: 2–3; road: 6–3)

Game	Date	Team	Score	High points	High rebounds	High assists	Location Attendance	Record
16	December 1	Denver	L 98–112	Rudy Gay (23)	Jonas Valančiūnas (11)	Kyle Lowry (7)	Air Canada Centre (16,290)	6–10
17	December 3	@ Golden State	L 103–112	DeMar DeRozan (26)	Amir Johnson (10)	Kyle Lowry (9)	Oracle Arena (19,596)	6–11
18	December 6	@ Phoenix	L 97–106	Amir Johnson (22)	Gay & Valančiūnas (10)	Kyle Lowry (7)	US Airways Center (12,672)	6–12
19	December 8	@ L.A. Lakers	W 106–94	Amir Johnson (32)	Amir Johnson (10)	Kyle Lowry (8)	Staples Center (18,997)	7–12
20	December 10	San Antonio	L 103–116	DeRozan & Johnson (19)	Amir Johnson (9)	DeRozan & Lowry (9)	Air Canada Centre (17,702)	7–13
21	December 13	Philadelphia	W 108–100	DeMar DeRozan (27)	Jonas Valančiūnas (13)	Kyle Lowry (11)	Air Canada Centre (17,133)	8–13
22	December 14	@ Chicago	W 99–77	Kyle Lowry (16)	Jonas Valančiūnas (11)	Lowry & Vásquez (6)	United Center (21,386)	9–13
23	December 18	Charlotte	L 102–104 (OT)	DeMar DeRozan (30)	Amir Johnson (13)	Greivis Vásquez (8)	Air Canada Centre (15,201)	9–14
24	December 20	@ Dallas	W 109–108 (OT)	Kyle Lowry (20)	Jonas Valančiūnas (13)	DeMar DeRozan (9)	American Airlines Center (19,406)	10–14
25	December 22	@ Oklahoma City	W 104–98	Kyle Lowry (22)	Amir Johnson (13)	Kyle Lowry (9)	Chesapeake Energy Arena (18,203)	11–14
26	December 23	@ San Antonio	L 99–112	Ross & Lowry (23)	Jonas Valančiūnas (9)	Kyle Lowry (9)	AT&T Center (18,581)	11–15
27	December 27	@ New York	W 95–83	DeMar DeRozan (25)	Jonas Valančiūnas (18)	Kyle Lowry (11)	Madison Square Garden (19,812)	12–15
28	December 28	New York	W 115–100	Kyle Lowry (32)	Jonas Valančiūnas (10)	Kyle Lowry (11)	Air Canada Centre (19,800)	13–15
29	December 31	@ Chicago	W 85–79	Jonas Valančiūnas (15)	Jonas Valančiūnas (9)	Kyle Lowry (6)	United Center (21,507)	14–15

January : 11–6 (home: 7–2; road: 4–4)

Game	Date	Team	Score	High points	High rebounds	High assists	Location Attendance	Record
30	January 1	Indiana	W 95–82	DeMar DeRozan (26)	DeRozan & Valančiūnas (9)	Kyle Lowry (14)	Air Canada Centre (18,271)	15–15
31	January 3	@ Washington	W 101–88	DeMar DeRozan (20)	Johnson & Valančiūnas (7)	Kyle Lowry (11)	Verizon Center (14,940)	16–15
32	January 5	@ Miami	L 97–102	DeMar DeRozan (26)	Amir Johnson (8)	Kyle Lowry (9)	American Airlines Arena (20,020)	16–16
33	January 7	@ Indiana	L 79–86	DeMar DeRozan (28)	Ross & Valančiūnas (8)	DeMar DeRozan (6)	Bankers Life Fieldhouse (16,147)	16–17
34	January 8	Detroit	W 112–91	Kyle Lowry (21)	Johnson & Valančiūnas (11)	Kyle Lowry (9)	Air Canada Centre (16,194)	17–17
35	January 11	Brooklyn	W 96–80	DeMar DeRozan (26)	Patrick Patterson (12)	DeMar DeRozan (5)	Air Canada Centre (19,800)	18–17
36	January 13	Milwaukee	W 116–94	Kyle Lowry (23)	Jonas Valančiūnas (10)	DeMar DeRozan (7)	Air Canada Centre (15,819)	19–17
37	January 15	@ Boston	L 83–88	DeMar DeRozan (23)	DeRozan & Valančiūnas (8)	Kyle Lowry (12)	TD Garden (17,569)	19–18
38	January 17	Minnesota	W 94–89	Kyle Lowry (24)	Jonas Valančiūnas (11)	Kyle Lowry (6)	Air Canada Centre (19,800)	20–18
39	January 19	L.A. Lakers	L 106–112	DeMar DeRozan (23)	Valančiūnas & Patterson (7)	Kyle Lowry (9)	Air Canada Centre (17,706)	20–19
40	January 20	@ Charlotte	L 95–100	DeMar DeRozan (25)	Chuck Hayes (13)	Greivis Vásquez (9)	Time Warner Cable Arena (14,929)	20–20
41	January 22	Dallas	W 93–85	DeMar DeRozan (40)	Jonas Valančiūnas (10)	Greivis Vásquez (7)	Air Canada Centre (18,179)	21–20
42	January 24	@ Philadelphia	W 104–95	DeMar DeRozan (34)	Kyle Lowry (10)	Kyle Lowry (10)	Wells Fargo Center (11,489)	22–20
43	January 25	L.A. Clippers	L 118–126	Terrence Ross (51)	Jonas Valančiūnas (11)	Kyle Lowry (12)	Air Canada Centre (19,800)	22–21
44	January 27	@ Brooklyn	W 104–103	Kyle Lowry (31)	Jonas Valančiūnas (13)	Kyle Lowry (6)	Barclays Center (15,790)	23–21
45	January 29	Orlando	W 98–83	Kyle Lowry (33)	Jonas Valančiūnas (15)	Kyle Lowry (11)	Air Canada Centre (17,694)	24–21
46	January 31	@ Denver	W 100–90	DeMar DeRozan (19)	Amir Johnson (9)	John Salmons (9)	Pepsi Center (17,131)	25–21

February : 7–5 (home: 4–2; road: 3–3)

Game	Date	Team	Score	High points	High rebounds	High assists	Location Attendance	Record
47	February 1	@ Portland	L 103–106	DeMar DeRozan (36)	Patrick Patterson (9)	DeMar DeRozan (12)	Moda Center (19,996)	25–22
48	February 3	@ Utah	W 94–79	DeMar DeRozan (23)	Amir Johnson (11)	DeRozan, Salmons & Vásquez (4)	EnergySolutions Arena (17,139)	26–22
49	February 5	@ Sacramento	L 101–109	Kyle Lowry (21)	Jonas Valančiūnas (11)	Kyle Lowry (8)	Sleep Train Arena (17,317)	26–23
50	February 7	@ L.A. Clippers	L 105–118	DeMar DeRozan (36)	Jonas Valančiūnas (13)	DeMar DeRozan (8)	Staples Center (19,060)	26–24
51	February 10	New Orleans	W 108–101	DeRozan & Patterson (22)	Jonas Valančiūnas (8)	Kyle Lowry (12)	Air Canada Centre (17,596)	27–24
52	February 12	Atlanta	W 104–83	DeMar DeRozan (31)	Jonas Valančiūnas (14)	Kyle Lowry (13)	Air Canada Centre (17,121)	28–24
All-Star Break
53	February 18	@ Washington	W 103–93	Kyle Lowry (24)	Patrick Patterson (6)	Kyle Lowry (10)	Verizon Center (15,624)	29–24
54	February 19	Chicago	L 92–94	DeMar DeRozan (32)	Tyler Hansbrough (7)	Kyle Lowry (7)	Air Canada Centre (17,704)	29–25
55	February 21	Cleveland	W 98–91	Terrence Ross (20)	Jonas Valančiūnas (8)	Kyle Lowry (9)	Air Canada Centre (18,854)	30–25
56	February 23	Orlando	W 105–90	Kyle Lowry (28)	Jonas Valančiūnas (9)	Kyle Lowry (6)	Air Canada Centre (17,435)	31–25
57	February 25	@ Cleveland	W 99–93	DeMar DeRozan (33)	Patrick Patterson (8)	Kyle Lowry (9)	Quicken Loans Arena (13,758)	32–25
58	February 27	Washington	L 129–134 (3OT)	DeMar DeRozan (34)	Jonas Valančiūnas (10)	Kyle Lowry (10)	Air Canada Centre (17,758)	32–26

March : 10–6 (home: 6–2; road: 4–4)

Game	Date	Team	Score	High points	High rebounds	High assists	Location Attendance	Record
59	March 2	Golden State	W 104–98	DeMar DeRozan (32)	Amir Johnson (9)	Kyle Lowry (8)	Air Canada Centre (18,658)	33–26
60	March 7	Sacramento	W 99–87	Terrence Ross (18)	Amir Johnson (9)	Kyle Lowry (7)	Air Canada Centre (18,188)	34–26
61	March 9	@ Minnesota	W 111–104	DeMar DeRozan (25)	Kyle Lowry (12)	Kyle Lowry (11)	Target Center (13,116)	35–26
62	March 10	@ Brooklyn	L 97–101	Kyle Lowry (21)	Kyle Lowry (8)	Kyle Lowry (7)	Barclays Center (17,351)	35–27
63	March 12	Detroit	W 101–87	DeMar DeRozan (25)	Jonas Valančiūnas (13)	Kyle Lowry (6)	Air Canada Centre (18,247)	36–27
64	March 14	Memphis	W 99–86	Jonas Valančiūnas (23)	Jonas Valančiūnas (9)	Kyle Lowry (12)	Air Canada Centre (18,465)	37–27
65	March 16	Phoenix	L 113–121	Kyle Lowry (28)	Valančiūnas & Lowry (5)	Kyle Lowry (13)	Air Canada Centre (18,717)	37–28
66	March 18	@ Atlanta	L 113–118 (OT)	DeMar DeRozan (29)	Amir Johnson (11)	Kyle Lowry (9)	Philips Arena (11,759)	37–29
67	March 19	@ New Orleans	W 107–100	DeMar DeRozan (31)	Tyler Hansbrough (13)	Kyle Lowry (5)	Smoothie King Center (15,282)	38–29
68	March 21	Oklahoma City	L 118–119 (2OT)	DeMar DeRozan (33)	Jonas Valančiūnas (13)	Johnson, Lowry & Vásquez (4)	Air Canada Centre (19,800)	38–30
69	March 23	Atlanta	W 96–86	Kyle Lowry (25)	Jonas Valančiūnas (13)	Greivis Vásquez (5)	Air Canada Centre (18,140)	39–30
70	March 25	@ Cleveland	L 100–102	Kyle Lowry (22)	Amir Johnson (9)	Kyle Lowry (10)	Quicken Loans Arena (15,497)	39–31
71	March 26	@ Boston	W 99–90	Terrence Ross (24)	Jonas Valančiūnas (14)	Kyle Lowry (4)	TD Garden (18,341)	40–31
72	March 28	Boston	W 105–103	DeMar DeRozan (30)	Valančiūnas & Johnson (8)	Lowry & Vásquez (5)	Air Canada Centre (19,800)	41–31
73	March 30	@ Orlando	W 98–93	DeMar DeRozan (28)	Jonas Valančiūnas (9)	Kyle Lowry (4)	Amway Center (16,018)	42–31
74	March 31	@ Miami	L 83–93	Greivis Vásquez (17)	Jonas Valančiūnas (10)	DeMar DeRozan (7)	American Airlines Arena (19,831)	42–32

April : 6–2 (home: 4–1; road: 2–1)

Game	Date	Team	Score	High points	High rebounds	High assists	Location Attendance	Record
75	April 2	Houston	W 107–103	DeMar DeRozan (29)	Terrence Ross (9)	Greivis Vásquez (8)	Air Canada Centre (18,294)	43–32
76	April 4	Indiana	W 102–94	Terrence Ross (24)	Jonas Valančiūnas (9)	DeMar DeRozan (9)	Air Canada Centre (19,800)	44–32
77	April 5	@ Milwaukee	W 102–98	Greivis Vásquez (26)	Jonas Valančiūnas (12)	Nando de Colo (6)	BMO Harris Bradley Center (16,310)	45–32
78	April 9	Philadelphia	W 125–114	Kyle Lowry (29)	Jonas Valančiūnas (12)	Kyle Lowry (8)	Air Canada Centre (18,789)	46–32
79	April 11	New York	L 100–108	DeMar DeRozan (26)	Jonas Valančiūnas (21)	DeMar DeRozan (5)	Air Canada Centre (19,800)	46–33
80	April 13	@ Detroit	W 116–107	DeMar DeRozan (30)	Chuck Hayes (10)	Kyle Lowry (7)	Palace of Auburn Hills (16,944)	47–33
81	April 14	Milwaukee	W 110–100	Greivis Vásquez (25)	Jonas Valančiūnas (13)	Greivis Vásquez (7)	Air Canada Centre (18,821)	48–33
82	April 16	@ New York	L 92–95	Kyle Lowry (22)	Tyler Hansbrough (9)	Lowry & Vásquez (5)	Madison Square Garden (19,812)	48–34

2013–14 season schedule

=== Standings ===
Atlantic Division	W	L	PCT	GB	Home	Road	Div	GP
y-Toronto Raptors	48	34	.585	–	26‍–‍15	22‍–‍19	11–5	82
x-Brooklyn Nets	44	38	.537	4.0	28‍–‍13	16‍–‍25	9–7	82
New York Knicks	37	45	.451	11.0	19‍–‍22	18‍–‍23	10–6	82
Boston Celtics	25	57	.305	23.0	16‍–‍25	9‍–‍32	5–11	82
Philadelphia 76ers	19	63	.232	29.0	10‍–‍31	9‍–‍32	5–11	82

Eastern Conference
#	Team	W	L	PCT	GB	GP
1	c-Indiana Pacers *	56	26	.683	–	82
2	y-Miami Heat *	54	28	.659	2.0	82
3	y-Toronto Raptors *	48	34	.585	8.0	82
4	x-Chicago Bulls	48	34	.585	8.0	82
5	x-Washington Wizards	44	38	.537	12.0	82
6	x-Brooklyn Nets	44	38	.537	12.0	82
7	x-Charlotte Bobcats	43	39	.524	13.0	82
8	x-Atlanta Hawks	38	44	.463	18.0	82
9	New York Knicks	37	45	.451	19.0	82
10	Cleveland Cavaliers	33	49	.402	23.0	82
11	Detroit Pistons	29	53	.354	27.0	82
12	Boston Celtics	25	57	.305	31.0	82
13	Orlando Magic	23	59	.280	33.0	82
14	Philadelphia 76ers	19	63	.232	37.0	82
15	Milwaukee Bucks	15	67	.183	41.0	82

== Playoffs ==
=== Game log ===
2014 playoff game log
Total: 3–4 (home: 2–2; road: 1–2)
First Round: 3–4 (home: 2–2; road: 1–2)

Game	Date	Team	Score	High points	High rebounds	High assists	Location Attendance	Series
1	April 19	Brooklyn	L 87–94	Kyle Lowry (22)	Jonas Valančiūnas (18)	Kyle Lowry (8)	Air Canada Centre (19,800)	0–1
2	April 22	Brooklyn	W 100–95	DeMar DeRozan (30)	Jonas Valančiūnas (14)	Greivis Vásquez (8)	Air Canada Centre (20,382)	1–1
3	April 25	@ Brooklyn	L 98–102	DeMar DeRozan (30)	Jonas Valančiūnas (10)	Greivis Vásquez (6)	Barclays Center (17,732)	1–2
4	April 27	@ Brooklyn	W 87–79	DeMar DeRozan (24)	Patrick Patterson (9)	Greivis Vásquez (9)	Barclays Center (17,732)	2–2
5	April 30	Brooklyn	W 115–113	Kyle Lowry (36)	Patrick Patterson (8)	Kyle Lowry (6)	Air Canada Centre (20,393)	3–2
6	May 2	@ Brooklyn	L 83–97	DeMar DeRozan (28)	Jonas Valančiūnas (9)	DeRozan & Lowry (4)	Barclays Center (17,732)	3–3
7	May 4	Brooklyn	L 103–104	Kyle Lowry (28)	Amir Johnson (10)	DeMar DeRozan (6)	Air Canada Centre (20,457)	3–4

2014 playoff schedule

== Player statistics ==
=== Regular season ===
Player	POS	GP	GS	MP	REB	AST	STL	BLK	PTS	MPG	RPG	APG	SPG	BPG	PPG
Jonas Valančiūnas	C	81	81	2,282	714	57	24	71	916	28.2	8.8	.7	.3	.9	11.3
Terrence Ross	SG	81	62	2,159	252	79	64	27	879	26.7	3.1	1.0	.8	.3	10.9
DeMar DeRozan	SG	79	79	3,017	343	313	86	28	1,791	38.2	4.3	4.0	1.1	.4	22.7
Kyle Lowry	PG	79	79	2,862	369	586	121	15	1,417	36.2	4.7	7.4	1.5	.2	17.9
Amir Johnson	PF	77	72	2,214	505	115	56	88	799	28.8	6.6	1.5	.7	1.1	10.4
Tyler Hansbrough	PF	64	4	978	287	17	28	19	312	15.3	4.5	.3	.4	.3	4.9
Greivis Vásquez^{†}	PG	61	5	1,314	139	228	25	4	582	21.5	2.3	3.7	.4	.1	9.5
John Salmons^{†}	SG	60	0	1,281	117	103	35	11	298	21.4	2.0	1.7	.6	.2	5.0
Steve Novak	PF	54	1	540	58	13	12	4	178	10.0	1.1	.2	.2	.1	3.3
Patrick Patterson^{†}	PF	48	7	1,118	243	63	42	34	437	23.3	5.1	1.3	.9	.7	9.1
Chuck Hayes^{†}	C	45	0	575	163	29	23	10	99	12.8	3.6	.6	.5	.2	2.2
Landry Fields	SF	30	2	322	59	20	10	3	68	10.7	2.0	.7	.3	.1	2.3
Nando de Colo^{†}	SF	21	0	193	28	33	7	3	65	9.2	1.3	1.6	.3	.1	3.1
Julyan Stone	SG	21	0	120	20	12	3	0	18	5.7	1.0	.6	.1	.0	.9
Rudy Gay^{†}	SF	18	18	639	133	40	28	23	350	35.5	7.4	2.2	1.6	1.3	19.4
Dwight Buycks	PG	14	0	146	23	10	8	0	43	10.4	1.6	.7	.6	.0	3.1
D. J. Augustin^{†}	PG	10	0	82	4	10	1	0	21	8.2	.4	1.0	.1	.0	2.1
Austin Daye^{†}	SF	8	0	33	7	2	0	0	8	4.1	.9	.3	.0	.0	1.0
Quincy Acy^{†}	SF	7	0	61	15	4	4	3	19	8.7	2.1	.6	.6	.4	2.7
Aaron Gray^{†}	C	4	0	20	8	3	0	0	5	5.0	2.0	.8	.0	.0	1.3

- ^{†} Denotes player spent time with another team in the season. Stats reflect time with the Raptors only.

=== Playoffs ===
Player	POS	GP	GS	MP	REB	AST	STL	BLK	PTS	MPG	RPG	APG	SPG	BPG	PPG
DeMar DeRozan	SG	7	7	282	29	25	8	2	167	40.3	4.1	3.6	1.1	.3	23.9
Kyle Lowry	PG	7	7	271	33	33	6	0	148	38.7	4.7	4.7	.9	.0	21.1
Jonas Valančiūnas	C	7	7	200	68	2	0	7	76	28.6	9.7	.3	.0	1.0	10.9
Amir Johnson	PF	7	7	191	42	7	3	4	77	27.3	6.0	1.0	.4	.6	11.0
Terrence Ross	SG	7	7	158	14	2	6	3	35	22.6	2.0	.3	.9	.4	5.0
Patrick Patterson	PF	7	0	199	47	9	3	3	73	28.4	6.7	1.3	.4	.4	10.4
Greivis Vásquez	PG	7	0	190	26	36	4	1	71	27.1	3.7	5.1	.6	.1	10.1
John Salmons	SG	6	0	77	6	5	2	0	13	12.8	1.0	.8	.3	.0	2.2
Chuck Hayes	C	5	0	38	8	2	3	0	6	7.6	1.6	.4	.6	.0	1.2
Steve Novak	PF	4	0	15	5	1	0	0	0	3.8	1.3	.3	.0	.0	.0
Tyler Hansbrough	PF	3	0	29	6	1	0	0	7	9.7	2.0	.3	.0	.0	2.3
Landry Fields	SF	3	0	26	7	1	4	1	0	8.7	2.3	.3	1.3	.3	.0
Nando de Colo	SF	1	0	4	1	0	0	0	0	4.0	1.0	.0	.0	.0	.0

== Transactions ==
=== Trades ===
Players Added

Via trade to Toronto

- Marcus Camby
- Steve Novak
- Quentin Richardson (sign and trade)
- 2016 first-round draft pick
- 2014 second-round draft pick
- 2017 second-round draft pick
Players Lost

Via trade to New York

- Andrea Bargnani

Players Added

Via trade to Toronto

- John Salmons
- Greivis Vásquez
- Patrick Patterson
- Chuck Hayes
Players Lost

Via trade to Sacramento

- Rudy Gay
- Aaron Gray
- Quincy Acy

Players Added

Via trade to Toronto

- Nando de Colo
Players Lost

Via trade to San Antonio

- Austin Daye

=== Waived ===
Player	Date waived	Ref
Linas Kleiza	July 16	
Marcus Camby	July 17	
Quentin Richardson	September 3	
D. J. Augustin	December 9	
