= Marcus Thornton (basketball, born 1987) =

American basketball player (born 1987)

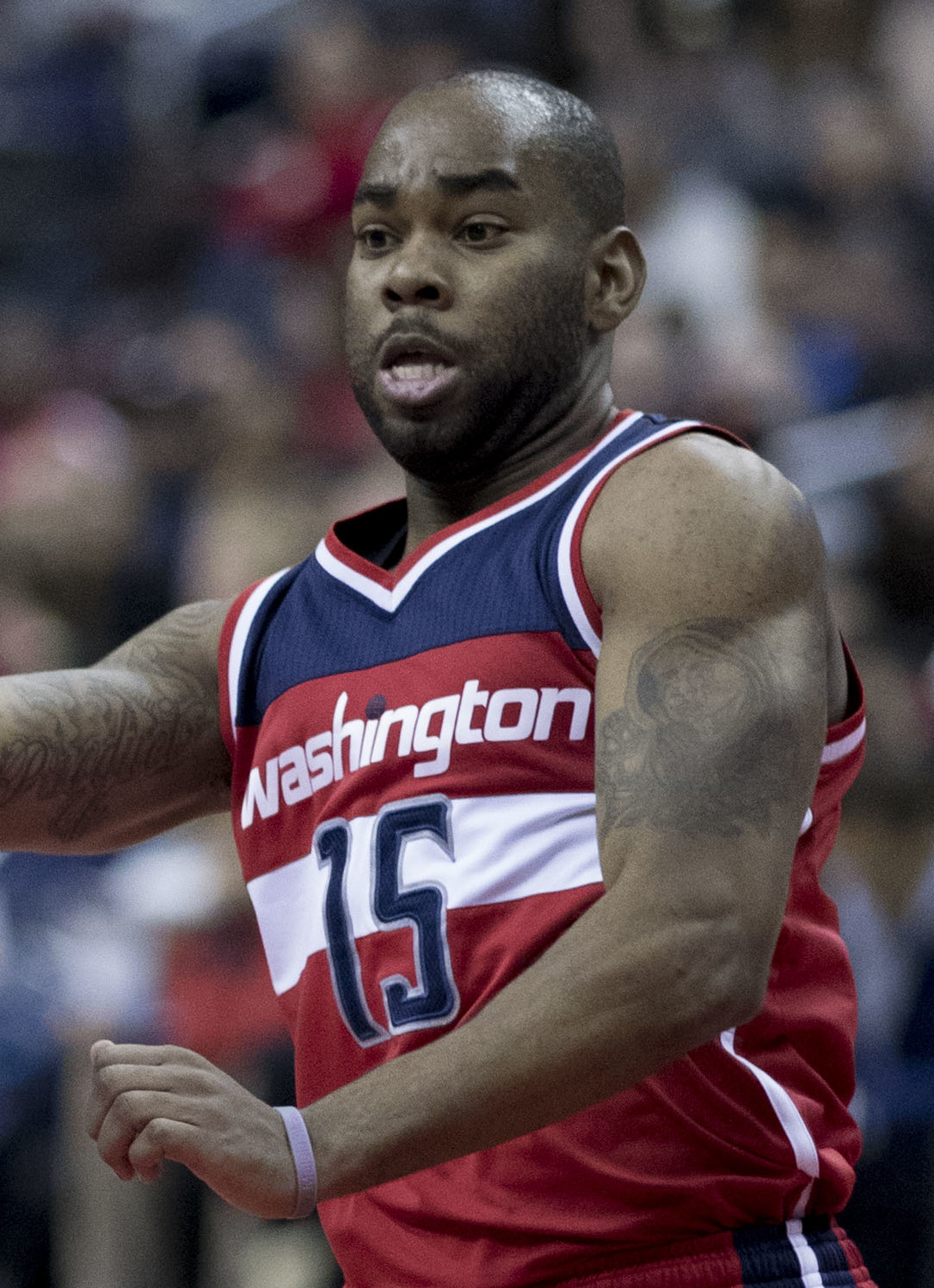
- Thornton with the Washington Wizards in 2016

Personal information
- Born: June 5, 1987 (age 39) Baton Rouge, Louisiana, U.S.
- Listed height: 6 ft 4 in (1.93 m)
- Listed weight: 205 lb (93 kg)

Career information
- High school: Tara (Baton Rouge, Louisiana)
- College: Kilgore (2005–2007); LSU (2007–2009)
- NBA draft: 2009: 2nd round, 43rd overall pick
- Drafted by: Miami Heat
- Playing career: 2009–2019, 2022
- Position: Shooting guard
- Number: 5, 23, 10, 4, 15

Career history
- 2009–2011: New Orleans Hornets
- 2011–2014: Sacramento Kings
- 2014: Brooklyn Nets
- 2014–2015: Boston Celtics
- 2015: Phoenix Suns
- 2015–2016: Houston Rockets
- 2016–2017: Washington Wizards
- 2017–2018: Grand Rapids Drive
- 2018: Beijing Ducks
- 2018–2019: Grand Rapids Drive
- 2022: Motor City Cruise

Career highlights
- NBA All-Rookie Second Team (2010); SEC Player of the Year (2009); First-team All-SEC (2009)
- Stats at NBA.com
- Stats at Basketball Reference

Marcus Terrell Thornton (born June 5, 1987) is an American former professional basketball player. He played college basketball for the LSU Tigers before being selected in the second round of the 2009 NBA draft by the Miami Heat. He played eight seasons in the National Basketball Association (NBA) for the New Orleans Hornets, Sacramento Kings, Brooklyn Nets, Boston Celtics, Phoenix Suns, Houston Rockets and Washington Wizards.

== College career ==
Thornton played two years at Kilgore College, a junior college in Kilgore, Texas. As a freshman in 2005–06, he averaged 14.5 points while shooting at 65 percent from the field. He averaged 26.9 points in his second season at Kilgore in 2006–07, earning first-team Junior College All-American honors and MVP honors for Region XIV. He was inducted into the Kilgore College Athletics Hall of Fame in 2025.

Following his sophomore season, Thornton transferred to Louisiana State University. As a junior in 2007–08 playing for the Tigers, he averaged 19.6 points (second in the SEC) and shot 81.7 percent from the free-throw line, the second-best percentage in the conference. As a senior in 2008–09, he averaged 21.1 points, 5.5 rebounds and 2.1 assists per game, subsequently earning the 2009 Southeastern Conference Men's Basketball Player of the Year. In two seasons at LSU, he finished with 1,347 points, 21st all-time and with a 20.4 scoring average, he ranked sixth all-time. He also finished eighth in school history with 168 three-pointers.

== Professional career ==
=== New Orleans Hornets (2009–2011) ===
Thornton was selected with the 43rd overall pick by the Miami Heat in the 2009 NBA draft, but his rights were traded to the New Orleans Hornets. On February 23, 2010, in a loss to the Cleveland Cavaliers, he tied a Hornets' franchise record for points scored by a rookie (37), and set a franchise record for points in a quarter (23) and points off the bench (previous, 33, Dell Curry). His 37 points also tied for the third most points by an NBA rookie off the bench since the 1976–77 season. He was named to the NBA All-Rookie Second Team in 2009–10 after averaging 14.5 points, 2.9 rebounds, 1.6 assists and 25.6 minutes per game in 73 games (started 17) with New Orleans. He also set a franchise rookie record with 117 three-pointers in a season.

=== Sacramento Kings (2011–2014) ===
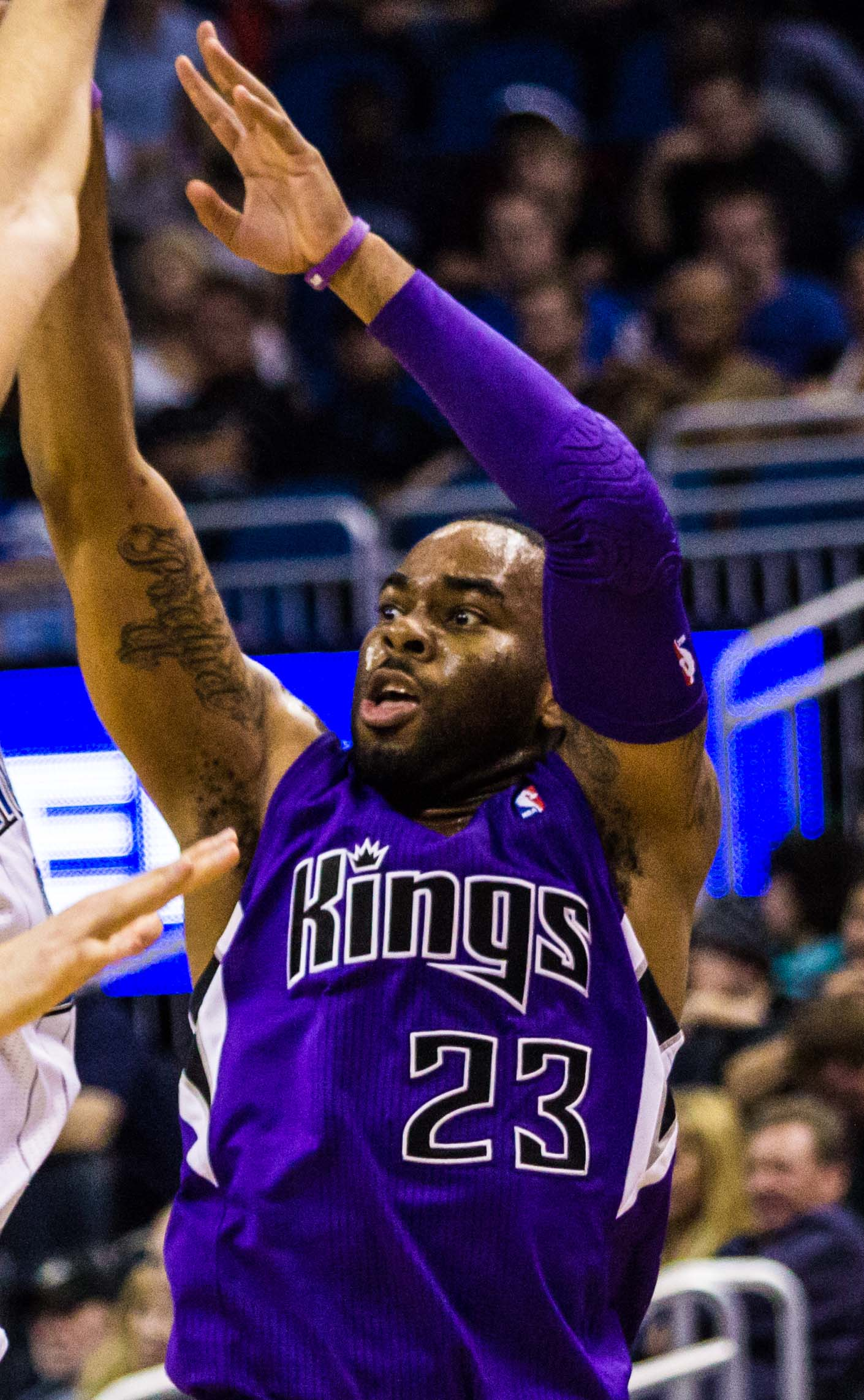
Thornton with the Kings in 2013

On February 23, 2011, Thornton was traded to the Sacramento Kings in exchange for Carl Landry. On March 14, 2011, he scored a career-high 42 points against the Golden State Warriors.

In the lockout-shortened 2011–12 season, Thornton averaged a team-leading 18.7 points, 3.7 rebounds, 1.9 assists, 1.4 steals and 34.9 minutes in starting all 51 games he played in.

On January 24, 2014, Thornton tied his career-high of 42 points in an overtime loss to the Indiana Pacers.

=== Brooklyn Nets (2014) ===
On February 19, 2014, Thornton was traded to the Brooklyn Nets in exchange for Jason Terry and Reggie Evans. His best game for the Nets came on March 9, as he scored 27 points in a win over the Kings.

=== Boston Celtics (2014–2015) ===
On July 10, 2014, Thornton was traded to the Boston Celtics in a three-team deal involving the Nets and the Cleveland Cavaliers. On December 7, he scored a season-high 21 points in the Celtics' 101–93 win over the Washington Wizards.

=== Phoenix Suns (2015) ===
On February 19, 2015, Thornton was traded, along with a 2016 first-round pick, to the Phoenix Suns in exchange for Isaiah Thomas. He completed the 2014–15 season with the Suns playing in just nine games. He did not manage game time in 18 of a possible 27 games with the Suns, largely thanks to an Achilles' tendon injury and being a non-rotation player on a non-playoff team.

=== Houston Rockets (2015–2016) ===
On July 25, 2015, Thornton signed with the Houston Rockets. On December 8, he scored a season-high 32 points in a loss to the Brooklyn Nets. On February 18, 2016, Thornton and Donatas Motiejūnas were traded to the Detroit Pistons in a three-team trade involving the Rockets and the Philadelphia 76ers. However, four days later, the Pistons rescinded their trade following a failed physical by Motiejūnas. Thornton didn't play again following his return to Houston, and on February 26, he was waived by the Rockets.

=== Washington Wizards (2016–2017) ===
On March 9, 2016, Thornton signed with the Washington Wizards. Two days later, he made his debut with the Wizards in a 114–93 loss to the Utah Jazz, recording two points, one assist and one steal in 20 minutes off the bench.

On July 28, 2016, Thornton re-signed with the Wizards.

On February 22, 2017, Thornton was traded, along with Andrew Nicholson and a 2017 first round draft pick, to the Brooklyn Nets in exchange for Bojan Bogdanović and Chris McCullough. He was waived by the Nets the next day.

=== Grand Rapids Drive (2017–2018) ===
On December 13, 2017, Thornton was acquired by the Grand Rapids Drive of the G-League.

=== Beijing Ducks (2018) ===
On February 4, 2018, Thornton signed with the Beijing Ducks of the Chinese Basketball Association.

=== Return to the Drive (2018–2019) ===
On December 11, 2018, Thornton was reacquired by the Grand Rapids Drive of the G-League. On March 3, 2019, Thornton scored 42 points to go along with 5 rebounds, 4 assists and 4 blocks in a 102–97 win over the Maine Red Claws.

=== Motor City Cruise (2022) ===
On January 8, 2022, Thornton was acquired via available player pool by the Motor City Cruise of the NBA G League, but was waived on January 21, after appearing in only 4 games.On February 18, 2025, Thornton was announced by Greek club Lavrio of the A1 division

== NBA career statistics ==
Legend
GP	Games played	GS	Games started	MPG	Minutes per game
FG%	Field goal percentage	3P%	3-point field goal percentage	FT%	Free throw percentage
RPG	Rebounds per game	APG	Assists per game	SPG	Steals per game
BPG	Blocks per game	PPG	Points per game	**Bold**	Career high

=== Regular season ===
Year	Team	GP	GS	MPG	FG%	3P%	FT%	RPG	APG	SPG	BPG	PPG
2009–10	New Orleans	**73**	17	25.6	**.451**	.374	.814	2.9	1.6	.8	**.2**	14.5
2010–11	New Orleans	46	0	16.2	.410	.376	.758	2.8	.9	.4	.1	7.8
2010–11	Sacramento	27	23	**38.1**	.450	.361	.805	**4.7**	**3.4**	**1.7**	**.2**	**21.3**
2011–12	Sacramento	51	**51**	34.9	.438	.345	.865	3.7	1.9	1.4	**.2**	18.7
2012–13	Sacramento	72	8	24.0	.429	.372	**.881**	2.5	1.3	.8	.1	12.7
2013–14	Sacramento	46	26	24.4	.381	.318	.808	2.7	1.0	.7	**.2**	8.3
2013–14	Brooklyn	26	1	23.8	.414	.380	.800	2.8	1.2	1.0	.1	12.3
2014–15	Boston	39	0	16.4	.416	**.419**	.824	1.9	.9	.5	**.2**	8.9
2014–15	Phoenix	9	0	9.0	.325	.105	.800	1.4	.2	.7	.0	3.6
2015–16	Houston	47	6	18.8	.400	.338	.879	2.4	1.4	.7	.1	10.0
2015–16	Washington	14	2	16.0	.393	.333	.762	2.5	1.4	.9	.1	8.4
2016–17	Washington	33	1	17.4	.400	.350	.852	2.3	1.4	.6	.1	6.6
Career		483	135	23.4	.425	.358	.830	2.8	1.4	.8	.1	11.9

=== Playoffs ===
Year	Team	GP	GS	MPG	FG%	3P%	FT%	RPG	APG	SPG	BPG	PPG
2014	Brooklyn	10	0	12.4	.389	.238	.667	1.9	.1	.2	.1	5.9
Career		10	0	12.4	.389	.238	.667	1.9	.1	.2	.1	5.9

== Personal life ==
Thornton's fiancée, Lyndsey Duplessis, gave birth to their first child on January 1, 2016, a daughter named Maleia. Thornton is a cousin of former NBA player Al Thornton.
