= Maurice Harkless =

American-Puerto Rican basketball player (born 1993)

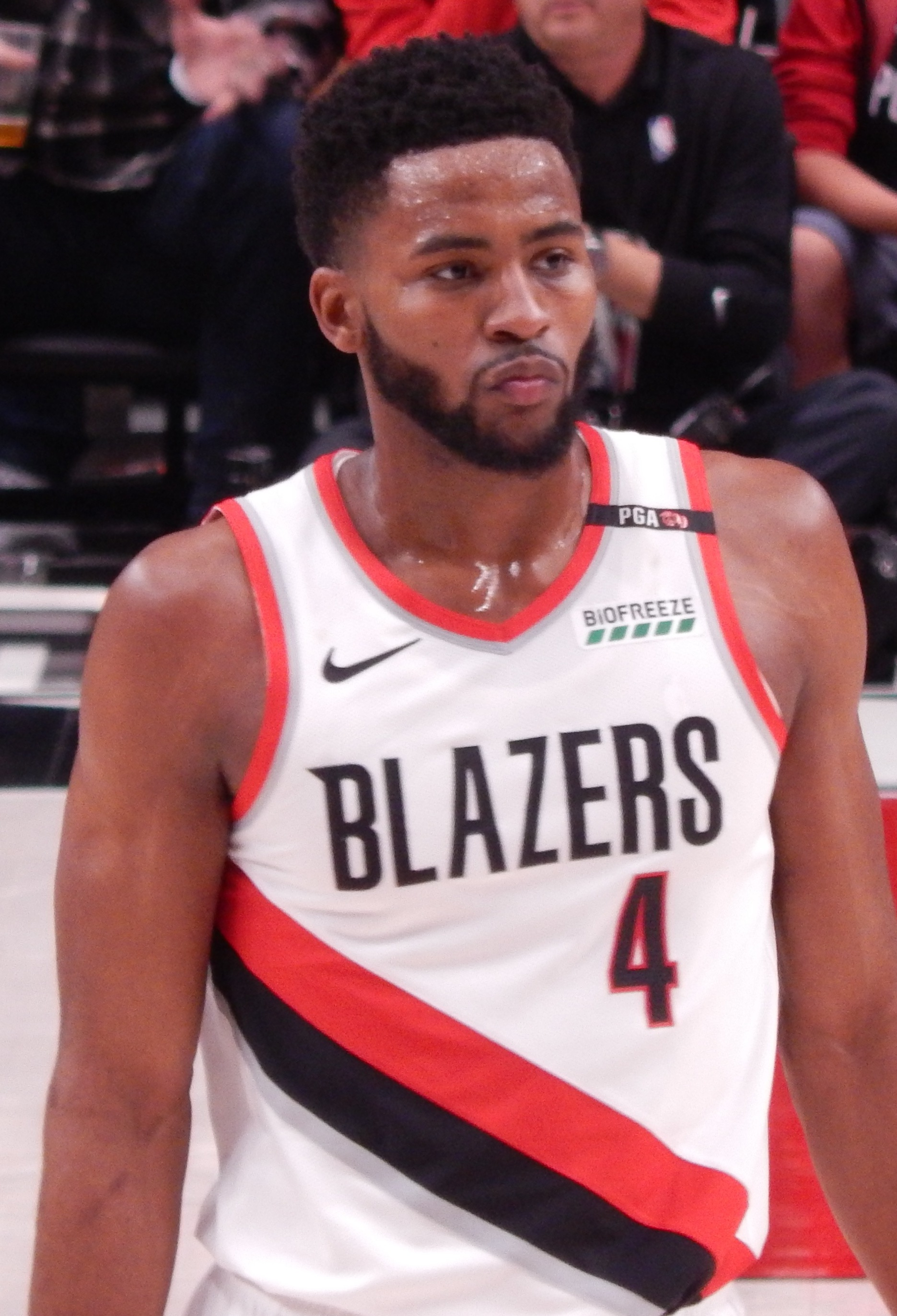
- Harkless with the Portland Trail Blazers in 2019

Personal information
- Born: May 11, 1993 (age 33) New York City, New York, U.S.
- Listed height: 6 ft 7 in (2.01 m)
- Listed weight: 220 lb (100 kg)

Career information
- High school: Forest Hills (New York City, New York); South Kent School (South Kent, Connecticut)
- College: St. John's (2011–2012)
- NBA draft: 2012: 1st round, 15th overall pick
- Drafted by: Philadelphia 76ers
- Playing career: 2012–2024
- Position: Small forward
- Number: 21, 4, 11, 8, 3, 28

Career history
- 2012–2015: Orlando Magic
- 2015–2019: Portland Trail Blazers
- 2019–2020: Los Angeles Clippers
- 2020: New York Knicks
- 2020–2021: Miami Heat
- 2021–2022: Sacramento Kings
- 2023–2024: Rip City Remix

Career highlights
- Big East Rookie of the Year (2012)
- Stats at NBA.com
- Stats at Basketball Reference

Maurice José Harkless (born May 11, 1993) is an American-Puerto Rican former professional basketball player, who played for ten seasons in the National Basketball Association (NBA). He played college basketball for the St. John's Red Storm before being drafted 15th overall, after his freshman season, in the 2012 NBA draft. Harkless has represented the Puerto Rican national team internationally.

== High school career ==
Harkless was born and adopted in New York City. He attended Forest Hills High School in Queens, before transferring to South Kent School in Connecticut prior to his senior season. He earned all-metro honors from both the Chicago Daily News and New York Post in 2008–09 and 2009–10, in addition to being named the New York Daily News's Queens High School Player of the Year in 2009–10 after averaging 16.5 points and 11.5 rebounds. At South Kent in 2010–11, he averaged 27.2 points, 13.6 rebounds, 4.2 assists, 3.1 blocks, and 1.6 steals per game. He was named MVP at the 2011 Yo Mama Classic in Philadelphia.

== College career ==
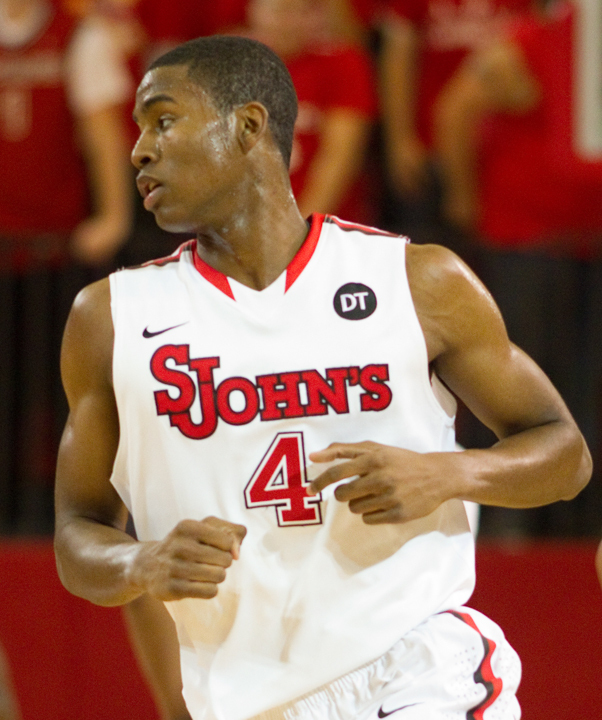
Harkless during his lone season at St. John's

Harkless played and started all 32 games during his freshman season at St. John's University in 2011–12, averaging 15.5 points, 8.6 rebounds, 1.5 assists, 1.59 steals, and 1.41 blocks in 36.1 minutes per game. He led the Red Storm in rebounding, blocked shots and minutes played, while finishing second in scoring and steals. He ranked second in the nation among freshmen in rebounding and sixth in scoring. He was named the Big East Rookie of the Year and earned All-Big East Honorable Mention. He scored in double figures 26 times and had 20-plus points seven times, including a career-high 32 points against Providence on December 27. He also recorded 11 double-doubles.

In March 2012, Harkless declared for the NBA draft, forgoing his final three years of college eligibility.

== Professional career ==
=== Orlando Magic (2012–2015) ===
On June 28, 2012, Harkless was selected with the 15th overall pick in the 2012 NBA draft by the Philadelphia 76ers. On August 10, 2012, he was traded from Philadelphia to the Orlando Magic as part of a four-team, 12-player deal. Harkless impressed in his first NBA season, averaging 8.2 points per game and providing good defense. He scored in double figures 29 times and had 20-plus points four times, including a career-high 28 points on April 1 against the Houston Rockets. He recorded one double-double during the season, registering 19 points and a career-high 14 rebounds on February 2 against the Milwaukee Bucks. He had at least one steal in 50 games and two-or-more steals 22 times, including a career-high six steals on March 15 against the Oklahoma City Thunder.

Harkless began the 2013–14 season starting alongside Arron Afflalo and Jameer Nelson. When Victor Oladipo was inserted into the starting lineup, coach Jacque Vaughn opted to play combinations of Nelson, Oladipo, Afflalo and Tobias Harris on the wing. As a result of the backlogged situation, Harkless' minutes decreased from his rookie season. He scored in double figures 30 times and had 20+ points three times, including a season-high 22 points on January 6 against the Los Angeles Clippers and February 25 against the Washington Wizards. He had one double-double during the season, recording 12 points and a season-high 10 rebounds on March 8 against the San Antonio Spurs. He recorded at least one steal 54 times and had two-or-more steals 31 times, including a season-high five steals on March 5 against Houston. During the 2013–14 season, Harkless averaged 7.4 points, 3.3 rebounds, and 1.0 assists in 24.4 minutes per game. He improved his 3-point shooting, increasing his accuracy from 27.4 percent as a rookie to 38.3 percent in his second year.

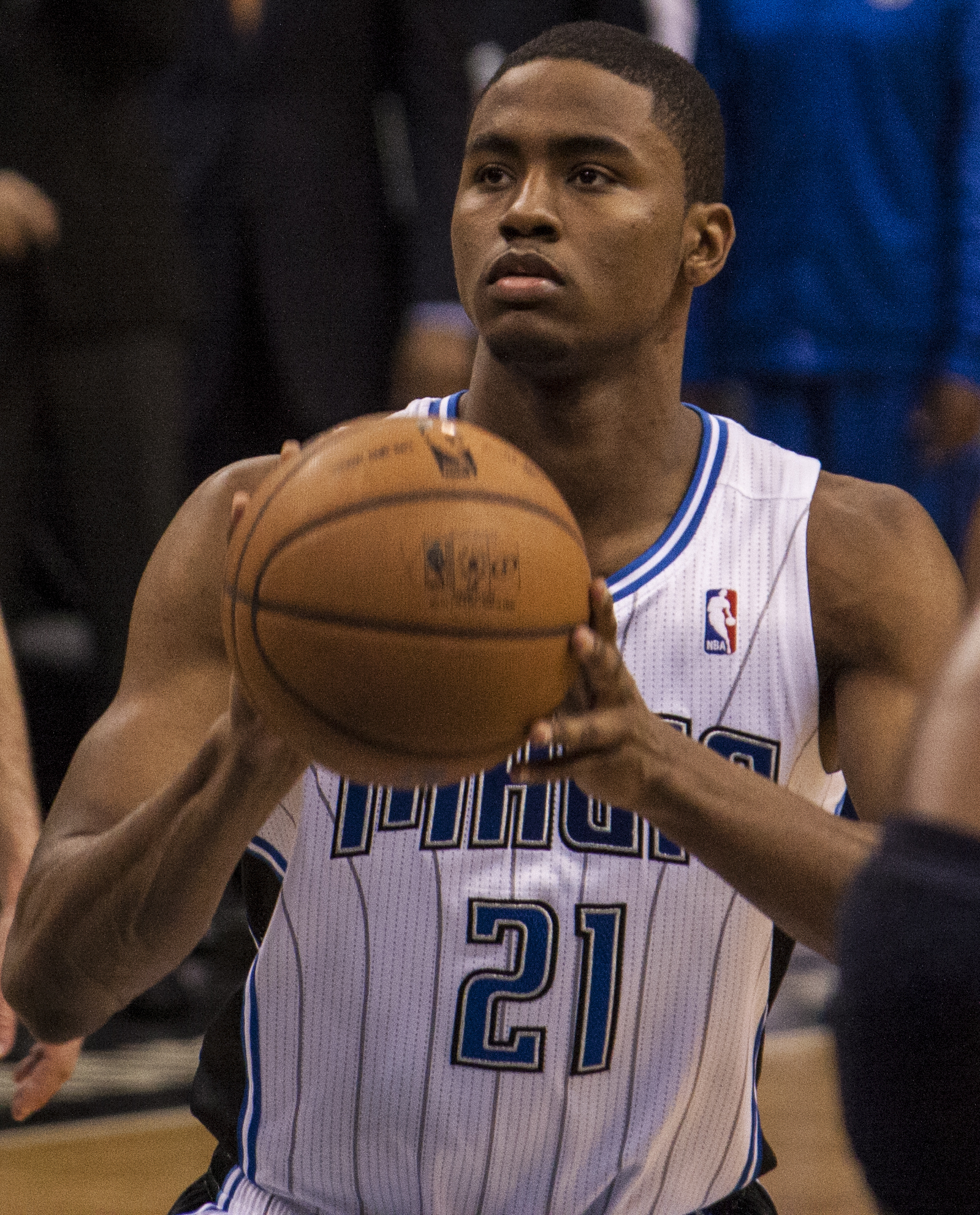
Harkless with the Magic in December 2012

Harkless bottomed out in 2014–15, receiving minimal playing time and creating questions about his future. He played in only a career-low 45 games during his third season in Orlando despite good health. Harkless sat behind fellow forwards Tobias Harris and Aaron Gordon during the 2014–15 season and averaged just 15 minutes per game. On March 18 against the Dallas Mavericks, Harkless started for Harris and played 36 minutes. He scored 18 points on 8-of-15 shooting, including two 3-pointers, grabbed six rebounds and recorded four steals. In the next game however against the Portland Trail Blazers, Harkless missed five of six shots and finished with just two points in 28 minutes. He made little impact the rest of the season.

=== Portland Trail Blazers (2015–2019) ===
On July 14, 2015, Harkless was traded to the Portland Trail Blazers in exchange for a 2020 second round draft pick. He worked his way up from the end of the bench to starter by the end of the 2015–16 season. Portland began to play small late in the season by inserting Harkless into the lineup. After averaging 6.4 points and 3.6 rebounds a game during the regular season, Harkless rode his inspired play into the playoffs, boosting his numbers to 11 points and 5.1 rebounds respectively. On February 10, 2016, he set season highs with 19 points and 13 rebounds in a 116–103 win over the Houston Rockets. On April 5, 2016, he recorded a season-high 20 points and a career-high 16 rebounds in a 115–107 win over the Sacramento Kings.

A restricted free agent over the summer, Harkless was expected to be re-signed, but when the Trail Blazers added Evan Turner and reacquired Allen Crabbe, it appeared Harkless would be heading elsewhere. However, on July 27, 2016, Harkless signed a four-year, $40 million contract to remain with the team. After experimenting with various lineups early in the preseason, coach Terry Stotts quickly settled back on Harkless as the starting small forward, a position he would hold on to for the majority of the season. After a scoreless, single-rebound performance on opening night against the Utah Jazz, Harkless put up 23 points and eight rebounds in the second game of the season against the Los Angeles Clippers on October 27. Harkless scored a season high-tying 23 points on November 30 against the Indiana Pacers. Harkless improved his 3-point shooting during the 2016–17 season, increasing his average from 28 percent to 35 percent. It was reported that Harkless was due a $500,000 bonus if he shot 35 percent or better from the 3-point line. Sitting at .351 with four games to go, Harkless declined to attempt a 3-pointer for the rest of the season, even sitting out one of the four games for unrelated reasons.

Harkless started the 2017–18 season as the starting small forward, before losing the spot after averaging 4.5 points and 3.8 rebounds over his first 18 games. On December 23, he scored a season-high 22 points against the Los Angeles Lakers. He found himself in and out of the rotation until an injury to Evan Turner in February saw Harkless return to the starting line-up. He appeared in 59 games in 2017–18 after surgery in late March to his left knee saw him sit out the last nine games of the regular season and two of Portland's four playoff games.

Over the first half of the 2018–19 season, Harkless missed 14 games because of his troublesome left knee. On April 9, 2019, he scored 26 points and hit a corner 3-pointer at the buzzer to lift the Trail Blazers to a 104–101 win over the Lakers.

=== Los Angeles Clippers (2019–2020) ===
On July 6, 2019, Harkless was traded to the Los Angeles Clippers along with a protected first round pick from the Portland Trail Blazers as part of a four-team trade, in which Miami acquired Jimmy Butler and the Portland Trail Blazers acquired Hassan Whiteside.

=== New York Knicks (2020) ===
On February 6, 2020, Harkless was traded to the New York Knicks in exchange for Marcus Morris in a three-team deal along with the Washington Wizards, with Los Angeles sending Jerome Robinson to Washington in exchange for Isaiah Thomas.

=== Miami Heat (2020–2021) ===
On November 23, 2020, Harkless signed with the Miami Heat.

=== Sacramento Kings (2021–2022) ===
On March 25, 2021, Harkless and Chris Silva were traded to the Sacramento Kings in exchange for Nemanja Bjelica. On August 7, 2021, Harkless re-signed with the Kings.

On July 6, 2022, Harkless was traded to the Atlanta Hawks along with Justin Holiday and a 2024 first-round draft pick in exchange for Kevin Huerter. Later in the off-season, on September 27, he was traded again to the Oklahoma City Thunder with a second-round pick for Vít Krejčí to get Atlanta under the luxury tax. Three days later, on September 30, Harkless was traded again, along with Ty Jerome, Derrick Favors, Théo Maledon and a future second-round pick, to the Houston Rockets in exchange for David Nwaba, Sterling Brown, Trey Burke, and Marquese Chriss. On October 11, he was waived.

=== Rip City Remix (2023–2024) ===
On November 26, 2023, Harkless joined the Rip City Remix of the NBA G League, but was waived on January 30, 2024.

== National team career ==
In January 2014, Harkless declared his interest in playing for Puerto Rico at the 2014 FIBA Basketball World Cup following a series of meetings with coach Paco Olmos. However, he later withdrew his name from contention in July 2014 in favor of preparing for the 2014–15 NBA season. A year later, he debuted for the Puerto Rican national team.

== Career statistics ==
Legend
GP	Games played	GS	Games started	MPG	Minutes per game
FG%	Field goal percentage	3P%	3-point field goal percentage	FT%	Free throw percentage
RPG	Rebounds per game	APG	Assists per game	SPG	Steals per game
BPG	Blocks per game	PPG	Points per game	**Bold**	Career high

=== NBA ===
==== Regular season ====
Year	Team	GP	GS	MPG	FG%	3P%	FT%	RPG	APG	SPG	BPG	PPG
2012–13	Orlando	76	59	26.0	.461	.274	.570	4.4	.7	**1.2**	.8	8.2
2013–14	Orlando	**80**	41	24.4	.464	.383	.594	3.3	1.0	**1.2**	.6	7.4
2014–15	Orlando	45	4	15.0	.399	.179	.537	2.4	.6	.7	.2	3.5
2015–16	Portland	78	14	18.7	.474	.279	.622	3.6	.9	.6	.4	6.4
2016–17	Portland	77	**69**	**28.9**	**.503**	.351	.621	4.4	1.1	1.1	**.9**	**10.0**
2017–18	Portland	59	36	21.4	.495	.415	.712	2.7	.9	.8	.7	6.5
2018–19	Portland	60	53	23.6	.487	.275	.671	**4.5**	1.2	1.1	**.9**	7.7
2019–20	L.A. Clippers	50	38	22.8	.516	.370	.571	4.0	1.0	1.0	.6	5.5
2019–20	New York	12	10	23.8	.455	.280	.625	3.3	**1.7**	.8	.3	6.8
2020–21	Miami	11	3	11.3	.385	**.455**	.000	1.2	.6	.2	.4	1.4
2020–21	Sacramento	26	20	24.9	.421	.247	**.805**	2.9	1.4	1.1	.6	6.9
2021–22	Sacramento	47	24	18.4	.459	.307	.714	2.4	.5	.6	.5	4.6
Career		621	371	22.6	.474	.320	.624	3.5	.9	.9	.6	6.9

==== Playoffs ====
Year	Team	GP	GS	MPG	FG%	3P%	FT%	RPG	APG	SPG	BPG	PPG
2016	Portland	11	11	24.7	.427	.341	.480	**5.1**	.6	.9	.3	**11.0**
2017	Portland	4	4	24.8	.294	.167	**.875**	3.3	.8	**1.3**	**1.3**	7.3
2018	Portland	2	1	**26.5**	**.538**	.333	–	4.0	**2.0**	.0	.5	8.0
2019	Portland	**16**	**16**	24.3	.477	.250	.639	4.9	1.4	1.1	1.0	8.4
Career		33	32	24.6	.436	.289	.609	4.7	1.1	1.0	.8	9.1

=== College ===
Year	Team	GP	GS	MPG	FG%	3P%	FT%	RPG	APG	SPG	BPG	PPG
2011–12	St. John's	32	32	36.1	.452	.215	.676	8.6	1.5	1.6	1.4	15.5

== Personal life ==
Harkless is the son of Rosa Harkless. He has one sister, Shakima Harkless, and a brother, Tyler Rodgers. His maternal grandfather is from Puerto Rico. He was raised by grandmother Barbara Harkless.

== See also ==
- List of Puerto Ricans
