= 2013–14 Orlando Magic season =

NBA professional basketball team season

- Head coach: Jacque Vaughn
- Owners: Orlando Magic, Ltd., a subsidiary of RDV Sports, Inc.
- Arena: Amway Center

Results
- Record: 23–59 (.280)
- Place: Division: 5th (Southeast); Conference: 13th (Eastern)
- Playoff finish: Did not qualify
- Stats at Basketball Reference

Local media
- Television: Fox Sports Florida, Sun Sports
- Radio: WDBO

The 2013–14 Orlando Magic season was the 25th season of the franchise in the National Basketball Association (NBA). The Magic improved upon their league-worst 20–62 record from the previous season, but not by much, finishing 23–59.

== Key dates ==
- June 27: The 2013 NBA draft took place in Newark, New Jersey.
- July 1: The free agency period begun.

== Draft picks ==
Round	Pick	Player	Position	Nationality	College
1	2	Victor Oladipo	SG	United States	Indiana
2	51	Romero Osby	F	United States	Oklahoma

1. On August 10, 2012, the Orlando Magic acquired a 2013 second round pick (the 51st pick) from the Denver Nuggets in a four team trade involving Dwight Howard. Orlando also received draft picks in 2014, 2015, and 2017.

== Roster ==
2013–14 Orlando Magic roster
Players

Pos.	No.	Player	Height	Weight	DOB	From
G/F	4	Arron Afflalo	6 ft 5 in (1.96 m)	215 lb (98 kg)	1985-10-15	UCLA
C	3	Dewayne Dedmon	7 ft 0 in (2.13 m)	255 lb (116 kg)	1989-08-12	USC
F	21	Maurice Harkless	6 ft 9 in (2.06 m)	220 lb (100 kg)	1993-05-11	St. John's
F	12	Tobias Harris	6 ft 9 in (2.06 m)	235 lb (107 kg)	1992-07-15	Tennessee
G	1	Doron Lamb	6 ft 4 in (1.93 m)	200 lb (91 kg)	1991-11-06	Kentucky
F	54	Jason Maxiell	6 ft 7 in (2.01 m)	260 lb (118 kg)	1983-02-18	Cincinnati
G	55	E'Twaun Moore	6 ft 4 in (1.93 m)	191 lb (87 kg)	1989-02-25	Purdue
G	14	Jameer Nelson	6 ft 0 in (1.83 m)	190 lb (86 kg)	1982-02-09	Saint Joseph's
F	44	Andrew Nicholson	6 ft 9 in (2.06 m)	250 lb (113 kg)	1989-12-08	St. Bonaventure
F/C	2	Kyle O'Quinn	6 ft 10 in (2.08 m)	250 lb (113 kg)	1990-03-26	Norfolk State
G	5	Victor Oladipo	6 ft 4 in (1.93 m)	215 lb (98 kg)	1992-05-04	Indiana
G	10	Ronnie Price	6 ft 2 in (1.88 m)	190 lb (86 kg)	1983-06-21	Utah Valley
C	9	Nikola Vučević	7 ft 0 in (2.13 m)	250 lb (113 kg)	1990-10-24	USC

Coaches
Head coach
- Jacque Vaughn
Assistant(s)
- James Borrego
- Wes Unseld, Jr.
- Brett Gunning
- Laron Profit
- Luke Stuckey
- Keon Weise (trainer)

Legend
- (DP) Unsigned draft pick
- (FA) Free agent
- (S) Suspended
- (DL) On assignment to D-League affiliate
- Injured

Roster
Updated: March 18, 2014

== Pre-season ==
2013 pre-season game log
Total: 2–6 (Home: 1–4; Road: 1–2)
Pre-season: 2–6 (home: 1–4; road: 1–2)

Game	Date	Team	Score	High points	High rebounds	High assists	Location Attendance	Record
1	October 9	New Orleans	L 95–99	Vučević & Harris (17)	Jason Maxiell (10)	Victor Oladipo (9)	Veterans Memorial Arena; 9,274	0–1
2	October 11	Cleveland	L 105–110	Victor Oladipo (18)	Victor Oladipo (8)	Jameer Nelson (7)	Amway Center; 13,611	0–2
3	October 14	@ Dallas	W 102–94	Maurice Harkless (16)	Victor Oladipo (11)	Victor Oladipo (4)	American Airlines Center; 17,136	1–2
4	October 16	@ Houston	L 104–108	E'Twaun Moore (17)	Andrew Nicholson (9)	Jameer Nelson (6)	Toyota Center; 12,341	1–3
5	October 18	Memphis	L 91–97	Victor Oladipo (22)	Nikola Vučević (11)	Jameer Nelson (6)	Amway Center; 13,041	1–4
6	October 20	Detroit	W 87–86	E'Twaun Moore (14)	Kyle O'Quinn (9)	Victor Oladipo (7)	Amway Center; 12,967	2–4
7	October 22	@ San Antonio	L 101–123	Victor Oladipo (22)	Kyle O'Quinn (9)	Afflalo & Oladipo (6)	AT&T Center; 16,326	2–5
8	October 25	New Orleans	L 82–101	Tobias Harris (12)	Vučević, Osby, Jones (7)	Ronnie Price (5)	Amway Center; 13,401	2–6

2013–14 season schedule

== Regular season ==
=== Standings ===
Southeast Division	W	L	PCT	GB	Home	Road	Div	GP
y-Miami Heat	54	28	.659	–	32‍–‍9	22‍–‍19	12–4	82
x-Washington Wizards	44	38	.537	10.0	22‍–‍19	22‍–‍19	10–6	82
x-Charlotte Bobcats	43	39	.524	11.0	25‍–‍16	18‍–‍23	6–10	82
x-Atlanta Hawks	38	44	.463	16.0	24‍–‍17	14‍–‍27	8–8	82
Orlando Magic	23	59	.280	31.0	19‍–‍22	4‍–‍37	4–12	82

Eastern Conference
#	Team	W	L	PCT	GB	GP
1	c-Indiana Pacers *	56	26	.683	–	82
2	y-Miami Heat *	54	28	.659	2.0	82
3	y-Toronto Raptors *	48	34	.585	8.0	82
4	x-Chicago Bulls	48	34	.585	8.0	82
5	x-Washington Wizards	44	38	.537	12.0	82
6	x-Brooklyn Nets	44	38	.537	12.0	82
7	x-Charlotte Bobcats	43	39	.524	13.0	82
8	x-Atlanta Hawks	38	44	.463	18.0	82
9	New York Knicks	37	45	.451	19.0	82
10	Cleveland Cavaliers	33	49	.402	23.0	82
11	Detroit Pistons	29	53	.354	27.0	82
12	Boston Celtics	25	57	.305	31.0	82
13	Orlando Magic	23	59	.280	33.0	82
14	Philadelphia 76ers	19	63	.232	37.0	82
15	Milwaukee Bucks	15	67	.183	41.0	82

=== Game log ===
2013–14 game log
Total: 23–59 (Home: 19–22; Road: 4–37)
October: 0–2 (home: 0–0; road: 0–2)

Game	Date	Team	Score	High points	High rebounds	High assists	Location Attendance	Record
1	October 29	@ Indiana	L 87–97	Andrew Nicholson (18)	Nikola Vučević (10)	Jameer Nelson (7)	Bankers Life Fieldhouse; 18,165	0–1
2	October 30	@ Minnesota	L 115–120 (OT)	Arron Afflalo (28)	Nikola Vučević (16)	Jameer Nelson (8)	Target Center; 17,988	0–2

November : 6–8 (home: 5–5; road: 1–3)

Game	Date	Team	Score	High points	High rebounds	High assists	Location Attendance	Record
3	November 1	New Orleans	W 110–90	Arron Afflalo (30)	Maurice Harkless (8)	Victor Oladipo (6)	Amway Center; 18,846	1–2
4	November 3	Brooklyn	W 107–86	Vučević & Oladipo (19)	Nikola Vučević (12)	Arron Afflalo (8)	Amway Center; 15,297	2–2
5	November 6	L.A. Clippers	W 98–90	Nikola Vučević (30)	Nikola Vučević (21)	Jameer Nelson (8)	Amway Center; 15,807	3–2
6	November 8	Boston	L 89–91	Arron Afflalo (23)	Nikola Vučević (13)	Jameer Nelson (7)	Amway Center; 17,555	3–3
7	November 9	@ Atlanta	L 94–104	Arron Afflalo (21)	Vučević & Nicholson (6)	Arron Afflalo (7)	Philips Arena; 15,189	3–4
8	November 11	@ Boston	L 105–120	Arron Afflalo (18)	Nikola Vučević (10)	Arron Afflalo (7)	TD Garden; 18,624	3–5
9	November 13	Milwaukee	W 94–91	Arron Afflalo (36)	Nikola Vučević (11)	Arron Afflalo (6)	Amway Center; 13,588	4–5
10	November 16	Dallas	L 100–108	Arron Afflalo (25)	Nikola Vučević (8)	Victor Oladipo (6)	Amway Center; 15,039	4–6
11	November 20	Miami	L 92–120	Arron Afflalo (30)	Nikola Vučević (6)	Jameer Nelson (5)	Amway Center; 17,526	4–7
12	November 23	@ Miami	L 99–101	Glen Davis (20)	Nikola Vučević (9)	Jameer Nelson (6)	American Airlines Arena; 19,647	4–8
13	November 24	Phoenix	L 96–104	Nikola Vučević (20)	Nikola Vučević (10)	Jameer Nelson (9)	Amway Center; 15,785	4–9
14	November 26	@ Atlanta	W 109–92	Arron Afflalo (26)	Nikola Vučević (15)	Jameer Nelson (10)	Philips Arena; 13,164	5–9
15	November 27	Philadelphia	W 105–94	Nikola Vučević (21)	Nikola Vučević (16)	Oladipo & Vučević (5)	Amway Center; 15,839	6–9
16	November 29	San Antonio	L 91–109	Arron Afflalo (17)	Glen Davis (8)	Lamb & Moore	Amway Center; 15,159	6–10

December : 4–11 (home: 2–5; road: 2–6)

Game	Date	Team	Score	High points	High rebounds	High assists	Location Attendance	Record
17	December 2	@ Washington	L 80–98	Arron Afflalo (21)	Nikola Vučević (8)	Ronnie Price (4)	Verizon Center; 12,809	6–11
18	December 3	@ Philadelphia	L 125–126 (2OT)	Arron Afflalo (43)	Victor Oladipo (10)	Glen Davis (6)	Wells Fargo Center; 10,061	6–12
19	December 6	@ New York	L 83–121	Arron Afflalo (20)	Davis & Oladipo (9)	Jameer Nelson (9)	Madison Square Garden; 19,812	6–13
20	December 8	@ Houston	L 88–98	Glen Davis (18)	Arron Afflalo (9)	Jameer Nelson (4)	Toyota Center; 16,407	6–14
21	December 9	@ Memphis	L 85–94	Nelson & Nicholson (19)	Andrew Nicholson (11)	Jameer Nelson (5)	FedExForum; 13,511	6–15
22	December 11	@ Charlotte	W 92–83	Davis & Nelson (17)	Nikola Vučević (14)	Jameer Nelson (6)	Time Warner Cable Arena; 11,377	7–15
23	December 13	Cleveland	L 100–109	Victor Oladipo (26)	Nikola Vučević (13)	Afflalo & Nelson (5)	Amway Center; 16,119	7–16
24	December 15	@ Oklahoma City	L 98–101	Arron Afflalo (25)	Nikola Vučević (16)	Jameer Nelson (8)	Chesapeake Energy Arena; 18,203	7–17
25	December 16	@ Chicago	W 83–82	Arron Afflalo (23)	Davis & Vučević (11)	Jameer Nelson (7)	United Center; 21,200	8–17
26	December 18	Utah	L 82–86	Jameer Nelson (17)	Nikola Vučević (14)	Jameer Nelson (4)	Amway Center; 15,574	8–18
27	December 21	Sacramento	L 100–105	Arron Afflalo (26)	O'Quinn & Vučević (9)	Davis & Nelson (3)	Amway Center; 14,283	8–19
28	December 23	New York	L 98–103	Arron Afflalo (26)	Nikola Vučević (12)	Jameer Nelson (10)	Amway Center; 15,105	8–20
29	December 27	Detroit	W 109–92	Arron Afflalo (23)	Nikola Vučević (11)	Victor Oladipo (11)	Amway Center; 16,464	9–20
30	December 29	Atlanta	W 109–102	Arron Afflalo (21)	Nikola Vučević (14)	Nelson & Oladipo (8)	Amway Center; 15,415	10–20
31	December 31	Golden State	L 81–94	Arron Afflalo (15)	Tobias Harris (9)	Jameer Nelson (6)	Amway Center; 15,062	10–21

January : 3–15 (home: 3–4; road: 0–11)

Game	Date	Team	Score	High points	High rebounds	High assists	Location Attendance	Record
32	January 2	@ Cleveland	L 81–87 (OT)	Glen Davis (16)	Glen Davis (13)	Jameer Nelson (9)	Quicken Loans Arena; 14,248	10–22
33	January 4	Miami	L 94–110	Jameer Nelson (21)	Tobias Harris (10)	Jameer Nelson (6)	Amway Center; 18,846	10–23
34	January 6	@ L.A. Clippers	L 81–101	Harkless & Oladipo (22)	Glen Davis (11)	Victor Oladipo (5)	Staples Center; 19,060	10–24
35	January 8	@ Portland	L 94–110	Arron Afflalo (22)	Tobias Harris (8)	Jameer Nelson (10)	Moda Center; 18,949	10–25
36	January 10	@ Sacramento	L 83–103	Tobias Harris (16)	Glen Davis (12)	Jameer Nelson (8)	Sleep Train Arena; 15,694	10–26
37	January 11	@ Denver	L 94–120	Tobias Harris (22)	Tobias Harris (9)	Jameer Nelson (7)	Pepsi Center; 17,947	10–27
38	January 13	@ Dallas	L 88–107	Jameer Nelson (21)	Glen Davis (8)	Jameer Nelson (7)	American Airlines Center; 19,695	10–28
39	January 15	Chicago	L 125–128 (3OT)	Victor Oladipo (35)	Tobias Harris (16)	Jameer Nelson (10)	Amway Center; 16,489	10–29
40	January 17	Charlotte	L 101–111	Arron Afflalo (24)	Glen Davis (11)	Victor Oladipo (10)	Amway Center; 16,164	10–30
41	January 19	Boston	W 93–91	Arron Afflalo (20)	Arron Afflalo (13)	Jameer Nelson (10)	Amway Center; 17,548	11–30
42	January 21	@ Brooklyn	L 90–101	Kyle O'Quinn (15)	Kyle O'Quinn (8)	Jameer Nelson (10)	Barclays Center; 15,482	11–31
43	January 22	Atlanta	L 109–112	Victor Oladipo (24)	Tobias Harris (12)	Nelson & Oladipo (7)	Amway Center; 16,713	11–32
44	January 24	L.A. Lakers	W 114–105	Tobias Harris (28)	Tobias Harris (20)	Afflalo & Nelson (6)	Amway Center; 16,101	12–32
45	January 26	@ New Orleans	L 92–100	Arron Afflalo (25)	Tobias Harris (9)	Jameer Nelson (8)	New Orleans Arena; 17,197	12–33
46	January 28	@ Detroit	L 87–103	Victor Oladipo (19)	Kyle O'Quinn (11)	Jameer Nelson (7)	Palace of Auburn Hills; 11,534	12–34
47	January 29	@ Toronto	L 83–98	Nikola Vučević (16)	Tobias Harris (11)	Davis & Nelson (4)	Air Canada Centre; 17,694	12–35
48	January 31	Milwaukee	W 113–102	Arron Afflalo (21)	Kyle O'Quinn (7)	Victor Oladipo (7)	Amway Center; 17,292	13–35

February : 5–7 (home: 4–1; road: 1–6)

Game	Date	Team	Score	High points	High rebounds	High assists	Location Attendance	Record
49	February 2	@ Boston	L 89–96	Arron Afflalo (18)	Nikola Vučević (11)	Victor Oladipo (5)	TD Garden; 18,624	13–36
50	February 3	@ Indiana	L 79–98	Arron Afflalo (20)	Nikola Vučević (13)	Victor Oladipo (11)	Bankers Life Fieldhouse; 16,266	13–37
51	February 5	Detroit	W 112–98	Victor Oladipo (20)	Maurice Harkless (9)	Jameer Nelson (11)	Amway Center; 15,166	14–37
52	February 7	Oklahoma City	W 103–102	Tobias Harris (18)	Nikola Vučević (10)	Afflalo & Harris (5)	Amway Center; 15,595	15–37
53	February 9	Indiana	W 93–92	Victor Oladipo (23)	Nikola Vučević (13)	Victor Oladipo (4)	Amway Center; 16,366	16–37
54	February 12	Memphis	L 81–86	Harris & Vučević (13)	Nikola Vučević (10)	Jameer Nelson (7)	Amway Center; 15,310	16–38
All-Star Break
55	February 18	@ Milwaukee	L 100–104	Arron Afflalo (21)	Harris, O'Quinn, & Vučević (9)	Jameer Nelson (13)	BMO Harris Bradley Center; 11,106	16–39
56	February 19	@ Cleveland	L 93–101	Arron Afflalo (23)	Nikola Vučević (12)	Jameer Nelson (9)	Quicken Loans Arena; 16,539	16–40
57	February 21	New York	W 129–121 (2OT)	Arron Afflalo (32)	Nikola Vučević (15)	Victor Oladipo (14)	Amway Center; 16,498	17–40
58	February 23	@ Toronto	L 90–105	Tobias Harris (28)	Tobias Harris (6)	Jameer Nelson (8)	Air Canada Centre; 17,435	17–41
59	February 25	@ Washington	L 106–115	Victor Oladipo (26)	Nikola Vučević (14)	Jameer Nelson (8)	Verizon Center; 13,306	17–42
60	February 26	@ Philadelphia	W 101–90	Nikola Vučević (21)	Nikola Vučević (13)	Jameer Nelson (12)	Wells Fargo Center; 12,817	18–42

March : 3–11 (home: 3–4; road: 0–7)

Game	Date	Team	Score	High points	High rebounds	High assists	Location Attendance	Record
61	March 1	@ Miami	L 98–112	Tobias Harris (20)	Kyle O'Quinn (15)	Jameer Nelson (11)	American Airlines Arena; 19,834	18–43
62	March 2	Philadelphia	W 92–81	Tobias Harris (31)	Nikola Vučević (17)	Victor Oladipo (4)	Amway Center; 16,704	19–43
63	March 5	Houston	L 89–101	Arron Afflalo (18)	Nikola Vučević (10)	Ronnie Price (5)	Amway Center; 16,012	19–44
64	March 8	@ San Antonio	L 112–121	Tobias Harris (23)	Nikola Vučević (13)	Jameer Nelson (5)	AT&T Center; 18,581	19–45
65	March 10	@ Milwaukee	L 98–105	Maurice Harkless (14)	Nikola Vučević (12)	Jameer Nelson (7)	BMO Harris Bradley Center; 10,114	19–46
66	March 12	Denver	L 112–120	Arron Afflalo (24)	Nikola Vučević (16)	Jameer Nelson (9)	Amway Center; 16,097	19–47
67	March 14	Washington	L 101–105	Tobias Harris (21)	Nikola Vučević (12)	Jameer Nelson (8)	Amway Center; 16,011	19–48
68	March 18	@ Golden State	L 89–103	Nikola Vučević (15)	Tobias Harris (6)	Jameer Nelson (7)	Oracle Arena; 19,596	19–49
69	March 19	@ Phoenix	L 93–109	Arron Afflalo (20)	Kyle O'Quinn (11)	Victor Oladipo (9)	US Airways Center; 17,508	19–50
70	March 22	@ Utah	L 88–89	Victor Oladipo (19)	Nikola Vučević (13)	Arron Afflalo (6)	EnergySolutions Arena; 19,228	19–51
71	March 23	@ L.A. Lakers	L 94–103	Victor Oladipo (21)	Nikola Vučević (11)	Victor Oladipo (10)	Staples Center; 17,803	19–52
72	March 25	Portland	W 95–85	Tobias Harris (25)	Tobias Harris (11)	Victor Oladipo (6)	Amway Center; 17,896	20–52
73	March 28	Charlotte	W 110–105 (OT)	Nikola Vučević (24)	Nikola Vučević (23)	Jameer Nelson (8)	Amway Center; 16,003	21–52
74	March 30	Toronto	L 93–98	Nikola Vučević (22)	Nikola Vučević (10)	Jameer Nelson (5)	Amway Center; 16,018	21–53

April : 2–6 (home: 2–3; road: 0–3)

Game	Date	Team	Score	High points	High rebounds	High assists	Location Attendance	Record
75	April 2	Cleveland	L 98–119	Victor Oladipo (16)	Vučević & Harris (7)	Arron Afflalo (5)	Amway Center; 16,092	21–54
76	April 4	@ Charlotte	L 80–91	Victor Oladipo (16)	Dedmon & Harris (17)	Jameer Nelson (5)	Time Warner Cable Arena; 17,708	21–55
77	April 5	Minnesota	W 100–92	Arron Afflalo (18)	Kyle O'Quinn (13)	Jameer Nelson (12)	Amway Center; 16,992	22–55
78	April 9	Brooklyn	W 115–111	Arron Afflalo (25)	Dewayne Dedmon (9)	Jameer Nelson (7)	Amway Center; 16,085	23–55
79	April 11	Washington	L 86–96	Arron Afflalo (19)	Dewayne Dedmon (10)	Jameer Nelson (11)	Amway Center; 17,009	23–56
80	April 13	@ Brooklyn	L 88–97	Tobias Harris (18)	Nicholson & Harris (7)	Ronnie Price (6)	Barclays Center; 17,732	23–57
81	April 14	@ Chicago	L 95–108	Kyle O'Quinn (20)	Dewayne Dedmon (9)	Ronnie Price (11)	United Center; 22,087	23–58
82	April 16	Indiana	L 86–101	Maurice Harkless (14)	Dewayne Dedmon (13)	Ronnie Price (4)	Amway Center; 18,846	23–59

2013–14 season schedule

== Player statistics ==
=== Ragular season ===
Player	POS	GP	GS	MP	REB	AST	STL	BLK	PTS	MPG	RPG	APG	SPG	BPG	PPG
Victor Oladipo	PG	80	44	2,487	329	327	129	37	1,106	31.1	4.1	4.1	1.6	.5	13.8
Maurice Harkless	SF	80	41	1,950	264	80	97	50	592	24.4	3.3	1.0	1.2	.6	7.4
E'Twaun Moore	SG	79	3	1,506	136	112	60	13	499	19.1	1.7	1.4	.8	.2	6.3
Andrew Nicholson	PF	76	5	1,174	255	25	18	23	435	15.4	3.4	.3	.2	.3	5.7
Arron Afflalo	SG	73	73	2,552	262	248	35	3	1,330	35.0	3.6	3.4	.5	.0	18.2
Kyle O'Quinn	C	69	19	1,188	364	78	39	88	429	17.2	5.3	1.1	.6	1.3	6.2
Jameer Nelson	PG	68	68	2,179	231	476	52	5	820	32.0	3.4	7.0	.8	.1	12.1
Tobias Harris	PF	61	36	1,850	424	82	41	24	893	30.3	7.0	1.3	.7	.4	14.6
Nikola Vučević	C	57	57	1,812	626	104	60	47	811	31.8	11.0	1.8	1.1	.8	14.2
Doron Lamb	SG	53	0	695	49	43	11	1	191	13.1	.9	.8	.2	.0	3.6
Glen Davis^{†}	PF	45	43	1,354	282	70	46	22	545	30.1	6.3	1.6	1.0	.5	12.1
Jason Maxiell	PF	34	13	488	86	9	8	20	109	14.4	2.5	.3	.2	.6	3.2
Ronnie Price	SG	31	2	377	43	66	25	2	74	12.2	1.4	2.1	.8	.1	2.4
Dewayne Dedmon^{†}	C	16	6	234	78	2	7	13	59	14.6	4.9	.1	.4	.8	3.7
Solomon Jones	PF	11	0	85	16	2	2	2	14	7.7	1.5	.2	.2	.2	1.3
Adonis Thomas^{†}	SF	4	0	24	3	2	0	0	7	6.0	.8	.5	.0	.0	1.8

- ^{†} Denotes player spent time with another team in the season. Stats reflect time with the Magic only.

== Transactions ==
=== Free Agency ===
Additions
Player	Date signed	Former team
Jason Maxiell	July 18	Detroit Pistons
Ronnie Price	July 25	Portland Trail Blazers
Mickell Gladness	September 27	Santa Cruz Warriors (D-League)
Manny Harris	September 27	BC Azovmash (Ukraine)
Solomon Jones	September 27	New York Knicks
Kris Joseph	September 27	Boston Celtics

Subtractions
Player	Date signed	New Team
Beno Udrih	August 8	New York Knicks
Al Harrington	August 14	Washington Wizards
DeQuan Jones	September 29	Sacramento Kings

== Awards and honors ==
- Victor Oladipo – All-Rookie 1st Team
