= Victor Oladipo =

American basketball player (born 1992)

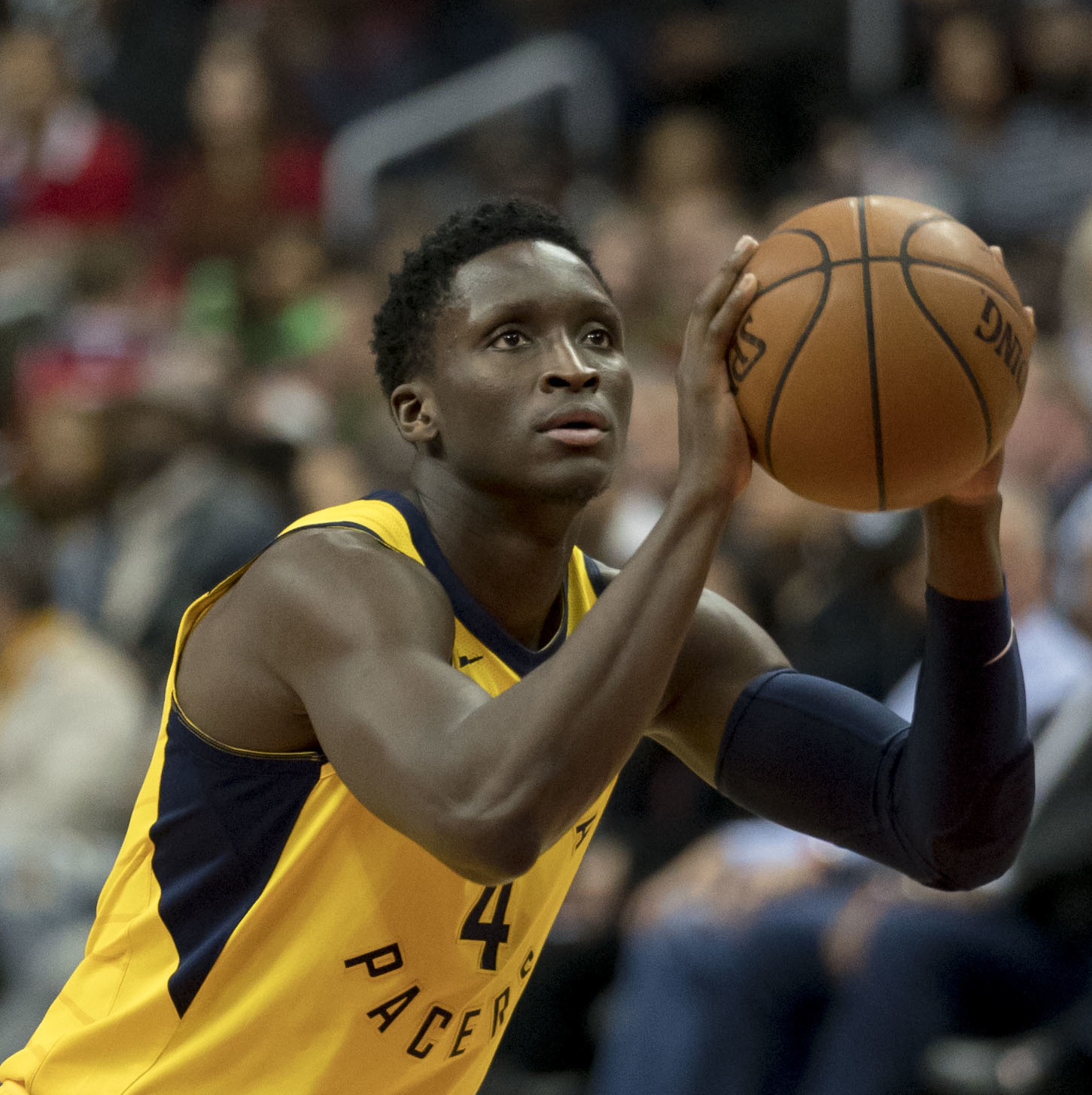
- Oladipo with the Indiana Pacers in 2018

Free agent
- Position: Shooting guard / point guard

Personal information
- Born: May 4, 1992 (age 34) Silver Spring, Maryland, U.S.
- Listed height: 6 ft 3 in (1.91 m)
- Listed weight: 213 lb (97 kg)

Career information
- High school: DeMatha Catholic (Hyattsville, Maryland)
- College: Indiana (2010–2013)
- NBA draft: 2013: 1st round, 2nd overall pick
- Drafted by: Orlando Magic
- Playing career: 2013–present

Career history
- 2013–2016: Orlando Magic
- 2016–2017: Oklahoma City Thunder
- 2017–2021: Indiana Pacers
- 2021: Houston Rockets
- 2021–2023: Miami Heat
- 2025–2026: Wisconsin Herd

Career highlights
- 2× NBA All-Star (2018, 2019); All-NBA Third Team (2018); NBA All-Defensive First Team (2018); NBA Most Improved Player (2018); NBA steals leader (2018); NBA All-Rookie First Team (2014); Sporting News Player of the Year (2013); Adolph Rupp Trophy (2013); Consensus first-team All-American (2013); NABC co-Defensive Player of the Year (2013); Big Ten Defensive Player of the Year (2013); First-team All-Big Ten (2013); 2× Big Ten All-Defensive team (2012, 2013)
- Stats at NBA.com
- Stats at Basketball Reference

Kehinde Babatunde Victor Oladipo (/ˌoʊləˈdiːpoʊ/ OH-lə-DEE-poh; born May 4, 1992) is an American professional basketball player who last played for the Wisconsin Herd of the NBA G League. He played college basketball for the Indiana Hoosiers, where in the 2012–13 season he was named the Sporting News Men's College Basketball Player of the Year, the Co-NABC Defensive Player of the Year, and a first-team All-American by the USBWA and Sporting News. That year, he was also named the winner of the Adolph Rupp Trophy, given annually to the top player in men's NCAA Division I basketball.

Oladipo was drafted with the second overall pick in the 2013 NBA draft by the Orlando Magic and went on to be named to the NBA All-Rookie First Team. He was traded to the Oklahoma City Thunder in 2016 and then traded to the Indiana Pacers in 2017. He became a first-time NBA All-Star, led the league in steals, was named to the All-Defensive First Team and the All-NBA Third Team, and won the NBA Most Improved Player Award in his first season with Indiana. Despite an injury-riddled 2018–19 season, including a season-ending injury in January 2019, Oladipo was named an Eastern Conference All-Star reserve for the second straight year. In January 2021, he was traded to the Houston Rockets, but was dealt to the Miami Heat just two months later. He underwent season-ending surgery after just four games with Miami and made his playing return in March 2022.

Oladipo is also a singer, having released an EP, Songs for You, in 2017, his debut full-length album V.O. in 2018, and an afrobeats-inspired EP, TUNDE, in 2023.

== Early life ==
Oladipo was born in Silver Spring, Maryland, and raised in Upper Marlboro, Maryland. His mother, a nurse, and father are both originally from Nigeria. Oladipo's parents immigrated to the United States in 1985, where they were married. Oladipo has three sisters, including a pair of twins.

== High school career ==
Oladipo played CYO basketball at St. Jerome Academy in Hyattsville, Maryland. While going to DeMatha High School, also in Hyattsville, he was on the basketball team. He remained there until 2010.

College recruiting
| Name | Hometown | School | Height | Weight | Commit date |
|---|---|---|---|---|---|
| Victor Oladipo; SG | Upper Marlboro, Maryland | DeMatha Catholic HS | 6 ft 4 in (1.93 m) | 216 lb (98 kg) | Sep 7, 2009 |
| Victor Oladipo; SG | Recruit ratings: Scout: Rivals: ESPN: (90) | | | | |
Overall recruit ranking: Scout: 6 (school) Rivals: 41 (SG); 144 (national)
Note: In many cases, Scout, Rivals, 247Sports, On3, and ESPN may conflict in their listings of height and weight.; In these cases, the average was taken. ESPN grades are on a 100-point scale.; Sources: "2010 Indiana Basketball Commitment List". Rivals.; "2010 Indiana College Basketball Team Recruiting Prospects". Scout.; "Indiana Hoosiers 2010 player commits". ESPN.; "Scout.com Team Recruiting Rankings". Scout.; "2010 Team Ranking". Rivals.

== College career ==
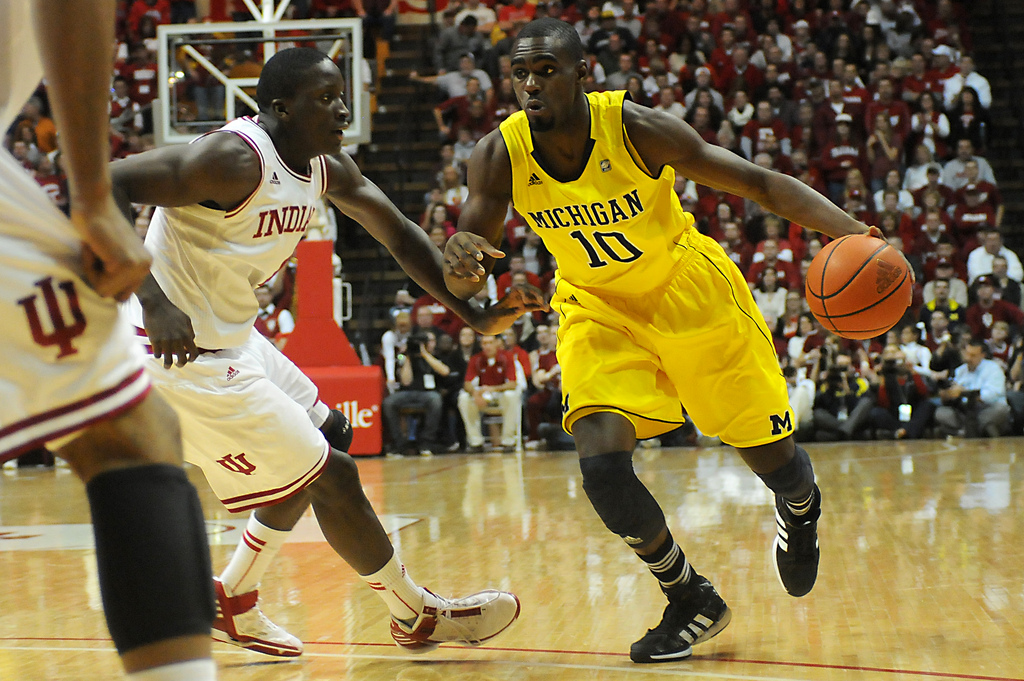
Oladipo (left) guards Tim Hardaway Jr. of the Michigan Wolverines in 2012

Oladipo chose to play basketball at Indiana University, turning down offers from Notre Dame, Maryland, Xavier and others. Upon his commitment to the Hoosiers, he said, "It's like a basketball atmosphere everywhere you go....Bloomington, Indiana is a basketball town. That's perfect." He joined during the 2010–11 season, playing 32 games with five starts as a freshman, averaging 7.4 points, 3.7 rebounds and 1.1 steals in 18.0 minutes per game.

As a sophomore during the 2011–12 season, Justin Albers from Inside the Hall referred him as "Indiana's most improved player this season". In the 2012 NCAA tournament, the Hoosiers lost in the Sweet Sixteen to Kentucky. In 36 games, he made 34 starts and averaged 10.8 points, 3.6 rebounds, 2.0 assists and 1.4 steals in 26.7 minutes per game.

In the 2012–13 season, despite an Indiana roster deep with talent, Oladipo emerged as one of the nation's biggest stars. Midway through the season, ESPN reporter Eamonn Brenann wrote, "In 2½ seasons in Bloomington, Oladipo has morphed from a raw athletic specimen to a defensive specialist/energy glue guy – he became a hit with IU fans for holding his hand in front of his face after dunks at home, typically after a steal he himself created – into a sudden, stunning, bona fide collegiate star." Due in part to Oladipo's leadership, the Indiana Hoosiers finished the 2012–13 season as the outright Big Ten champions. At the end of the regular season, Oladipo ranked fourth in the country in field goal percentage (61.4), on pace to have the highest field goal percentage by any guard since the 1996–97 season. Among Wooden Award finalists, he had the best net rating, which is the difference between points produced and points allowed per 100 possessions. Oladipo produced 42 more points than he allowed per 100 possessions.

In 2012–13, Oladipo played and started in all 36 games, averaging 13.6 points, 6.3 rebounds, 2.1 assists and 2.2 steals in 28.4 minutes per game. He was subsequently named the Sporting News Men's College Basketball Player of the Year, the National Co-Defensive Player of the Year, and a first-team All-American by the USBWA and Sporting News. In conference honors, he was named a unanimous pick to the first-team All-Big Ten by both the coaches and media, and was named Big Ten Defensive Player of the year.

== Professional career ==
=== Orlando Magic (2013–2016) ===
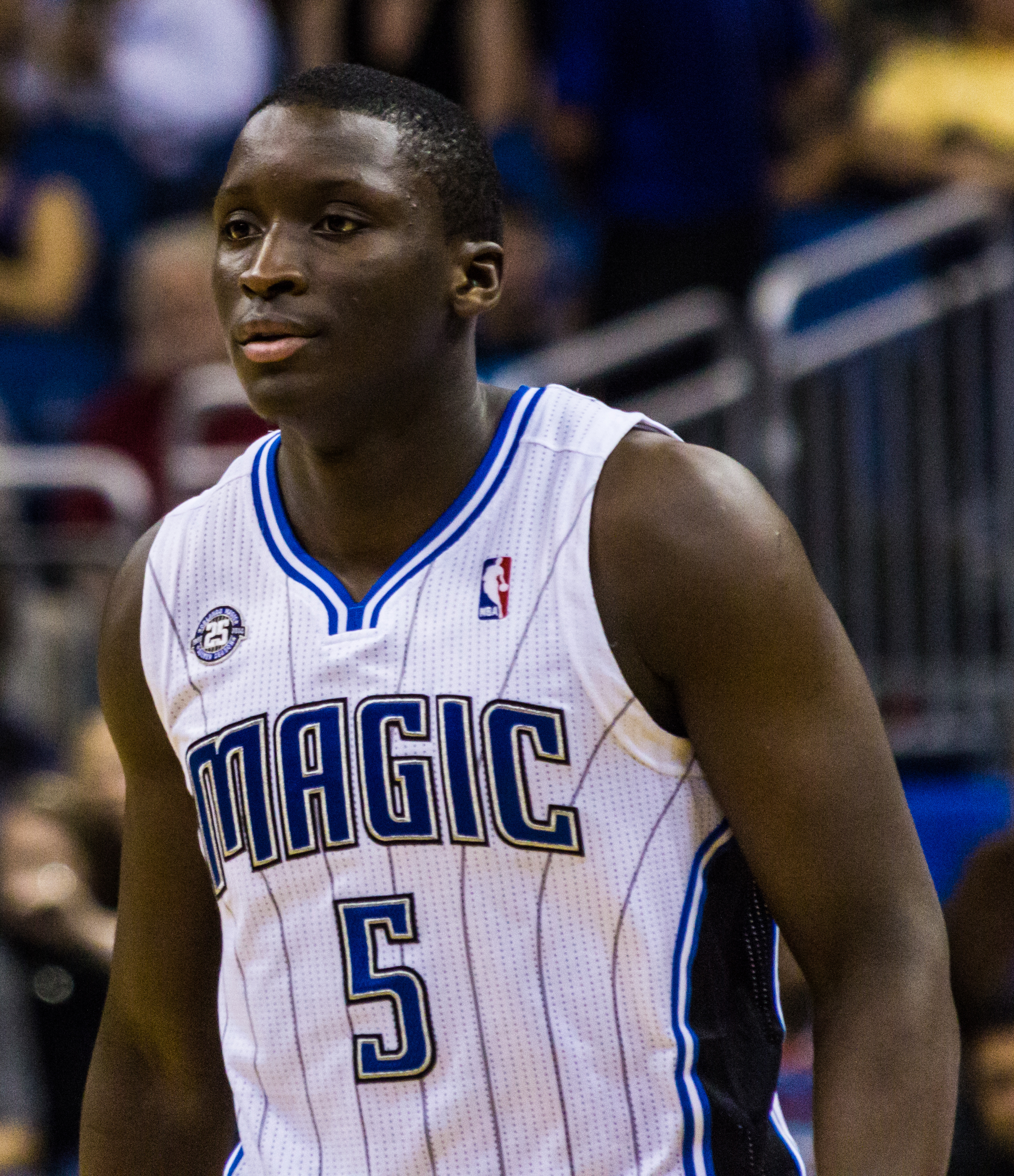
Oladipo with the Magic in 2013

On April 9, 2013, at a press conference with Tom Crean, Oladipo announced his decision to forgo his senior season at Indiana and enter the 2013 NBA draft. He was projected as a top-15 pick by ESPN and CBS Sports. Oladipo was invited to sit in the "green room" during the draft and was selected second overall by the Orlando Magic, later signing his rookie-scale contract with the Magic on July 8.

When the 2013 rookie class convened for its annual photo shoot and filled out its NBA.com Rookie Survey, the class voted Oladipo as the best defender, the co-favorite 2013–14 Rookie of the Year (with CJ McCollum), the co-favorite to have the best career (with Kelly Olynyk) and second-most athletic (behind Tony Mitchell).

On December 3, 2013, Oladipo recorded his first career triple-double with 26 points, 10 rebounds and 10 assists in a double overtime loss to the Philadelphia 76ers. Rookie Michael Carter-Williams of the 76ers also recorded his first career triple-double in the same game, marking the first and only time in NBA history that two rookies have recorded triple-doubles in the same game. The last time that two players had recorded their first career triple-doubles in the same game was when Detroit Pistons' pair Donnie Butcher and Ray Scott did it on March 14, 1964 (they were not rookies). It was also the first time that two opponents had recorded triple-doubles in the same game since Caron Butler and Baron Davis had done so on November 23, 2007. During the month of February, Oladipo participated in the Rising Stars Challenge and the Taco Bell Skills Challenge. Oladipo went on to finish second in the Rookie of the Year voting behind Carter-Williams.

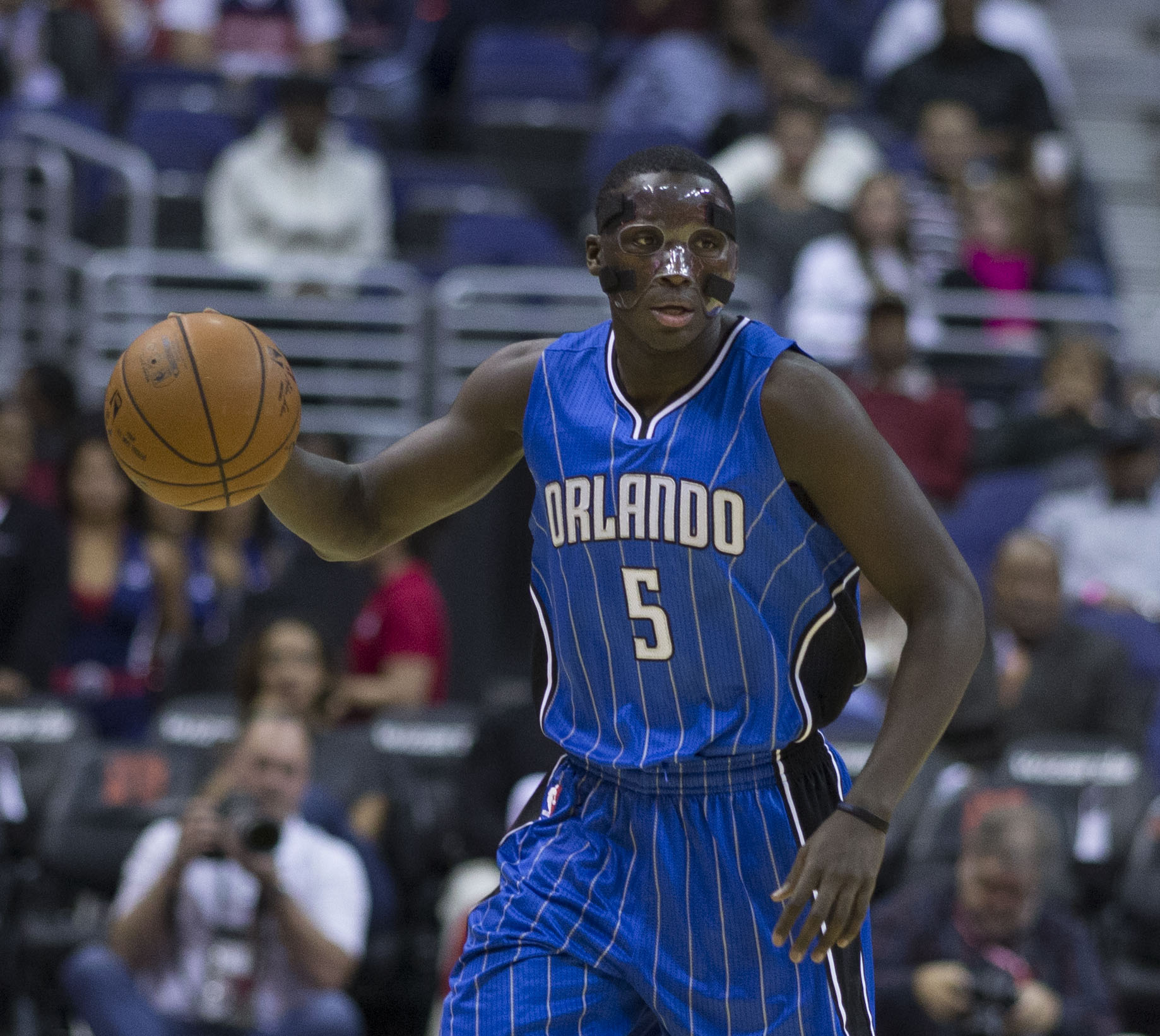
Oladipo with the Magic in 2014

On October 24, 2014, Oladipo was ruled out indefinitely after suffering a facial fracture in practice the previous day. Two days later, the Magic exercised their third-year team option on Oladipo's rookie scale contract, extending the contract through the 2015–16 season. He made his return from injury on November 14 wearing a facial protection mask as he made his season debut against the Milwaukee Bucks. In 25 minutes off the bench, he recorded 13 points, 3 rebounds and 2 assists in a 101–85 win. During the 2015 NBA All-Star Weekend, Oladipo competed in the Rising Stars Challenge and the Slam Dunk Contest, finishing second in the dunk contest behind Zach LaVine. On March 4, 2015, Oladipo scored a career-high 38 points on 15-of-25 shooting in a loss to the Phoenix Suns.

On October 25, 2015, the Magic exercised their fourth-year team option on Oladipo's rookie scale contract, extending the contract through the 2016–17 season. Five days later, he recorded his second career triple-double with 21 points, 13 rebounds and 10 assists in a double-overtime loss to the Oklahoma City Thunder. He also hit a buzzer-beating three-pointer to send the game into double overtime. Oladipo averaged just 12.8 points per game over his first 12 games of the season. Head coach Scott Skiles moved Oladipo to a bench role for the Magic's November 25 game against the New York Knicks. Oladipo continued coming off the bench following this performance, averaging 17.0 points, 5.4 rebounds, 4.5 assists, 1.0 steals and 1.4 blocks over his first eight games off the bench. On January 4, he started for the Magic for the first time since November 23. In 34 minutes of action, he recorded a team-high 18 points, 7 rebounds, 5 assists and 2 steals in a loss to the Detroit Pistons. On March 18, he scored a career-high 45 points in a 109–103 loss to the Cleveland Cavaliers, becoming the ninth player in franchise history to score 40 points in a game and the first Magic player to do so since Arron Afflalo in December 2013. Oladipo missed the final three games of the season with a concussion.

=== Oklahoma City Thunder (2016–2017) ===
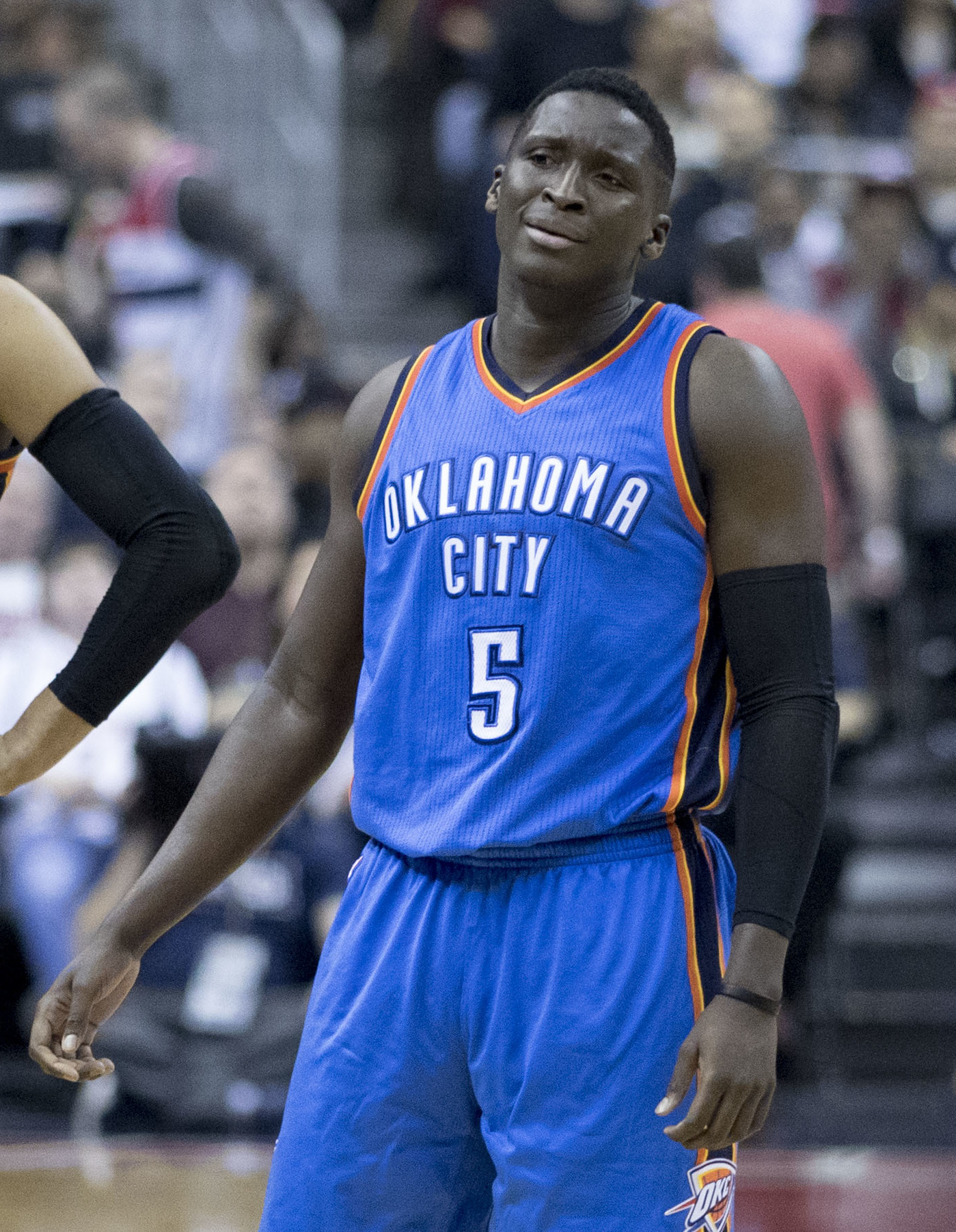
Oladipo with the Thunder in 2017

On June 23, 2016, Oladipo was traded, along with Ersan İlyasova and the draft rights to Domantas Sabonis, to the Oklahoma City Thunder in exchange for Serge Ibaka. He made his debut for the Thunder in their season opener on October 26, scoring 10 points in 26 minutes as a starter in a 103–97 win over the Philadelphia 76ers. On October 31, he signed a four-year, $84 million contract extension with the Thunder. A right wrist injury in mid-December forced Oladipo to miss nine straight games. He returned to action on December 31 and scored 15 points against the Los Angeles Clippers. On March 7, 2017, Oladipo returned to the starting lineup after missing six games with back spasms and scored 16 points in a 126–121 loss to Portland.

=== Indiana Pacers (2017–2021) ===
==== 2017–18 season ====
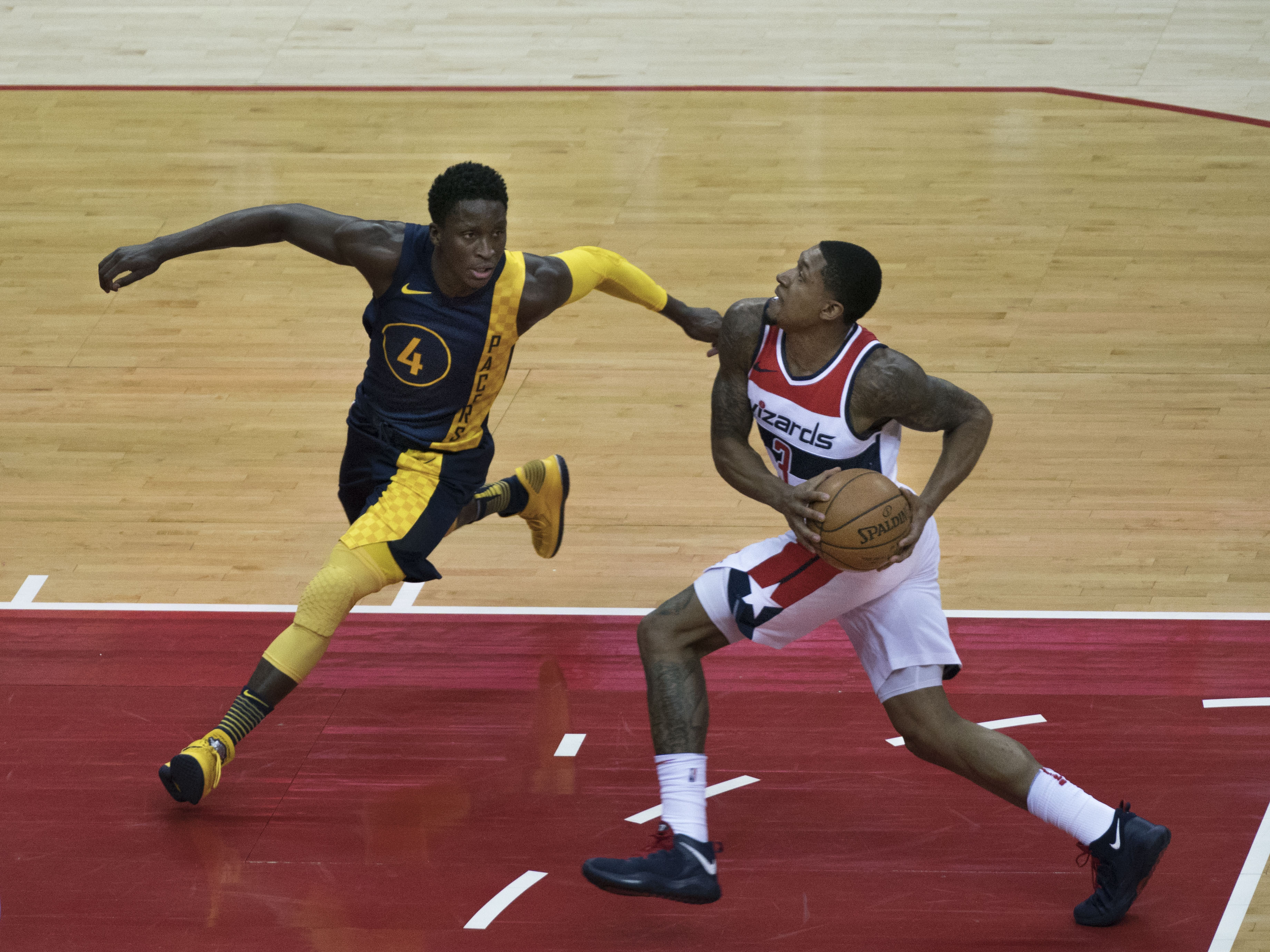
Oladipo (left) with the Pacers, guarding Bradley Beal in 2018

On July 6, 2017, Oladipo and Sabonis were traded to the Indiana Pacers in exchange for Paul George. In his debut for the Pacers in their season opener on October 18, Oladipo had 22 points, five rebounds, four steals and four assists in a 140–131 win over the Brooklyn Nets. On October 25, he scored a game-high 35 points on 11 for 18 shooting in a 114–96 loss to his former team, the Oklahoma City Thunder. On October 29, he had 23 points and five assists and knocked down a step-back 3-pointer with 10 seconds left to propel Indiana a 97–94 victory over the San Antonio Spurs. He was subsequently named Eastern Conference Player of the Week for games played October 23–29. On December 10, he had a career-high 47 points and added seven rebounds and six assists to lead the Pacers to a 126–116 overtime win over the Denver Nuggets. He was subsequently named Eastern Conference Player of the Week for games played December 4–10. On January 23, 2018, he was named an Eastern Conference All-Star reserve. On March 23, in a 109–104 win over the Los Angeles Clippers, Oladipo extended his streak of games with at least one steal to 56 games, breaking a tie with Chris Paul and Gary Payton for the sixth-longest such streak in NBA history.

In Game One of the Pacers' first-round playoff series against the Cavaliers, Oladipo scored 32 points in a 98–80 win. He became the fourth player in Pacers history with at least 30 points and six 3-pointers in a postseason game, joining Reggie Miller, Chuck Person and Paul George. In Game 6, Oladipo recorded his first career postseason triple-double with 28 points, 13 rebounds and 10 assists in a 121–87 win, helping the Pacers force a Game 7. The Pacers went on to lose Game 7 to bow out of the playoffs despite Oladipo's 30 points, 12 rebounds, six assists and three steals.

On June 25, Oladipo was named the NBA Most Improved Player for the 2017–18 season. Oladipo averaged 23.1 points per game (ninth in the NBA), 5.2 rebounds, 4.3 assists and led the NBA in steals at 2.4 per game. He set career highs in nearly every statistical category. Also in 2018, Oladipo was named to the All-NBA Third Team and the NBA All-Defensive First Team.

==== 2018–19 season ====
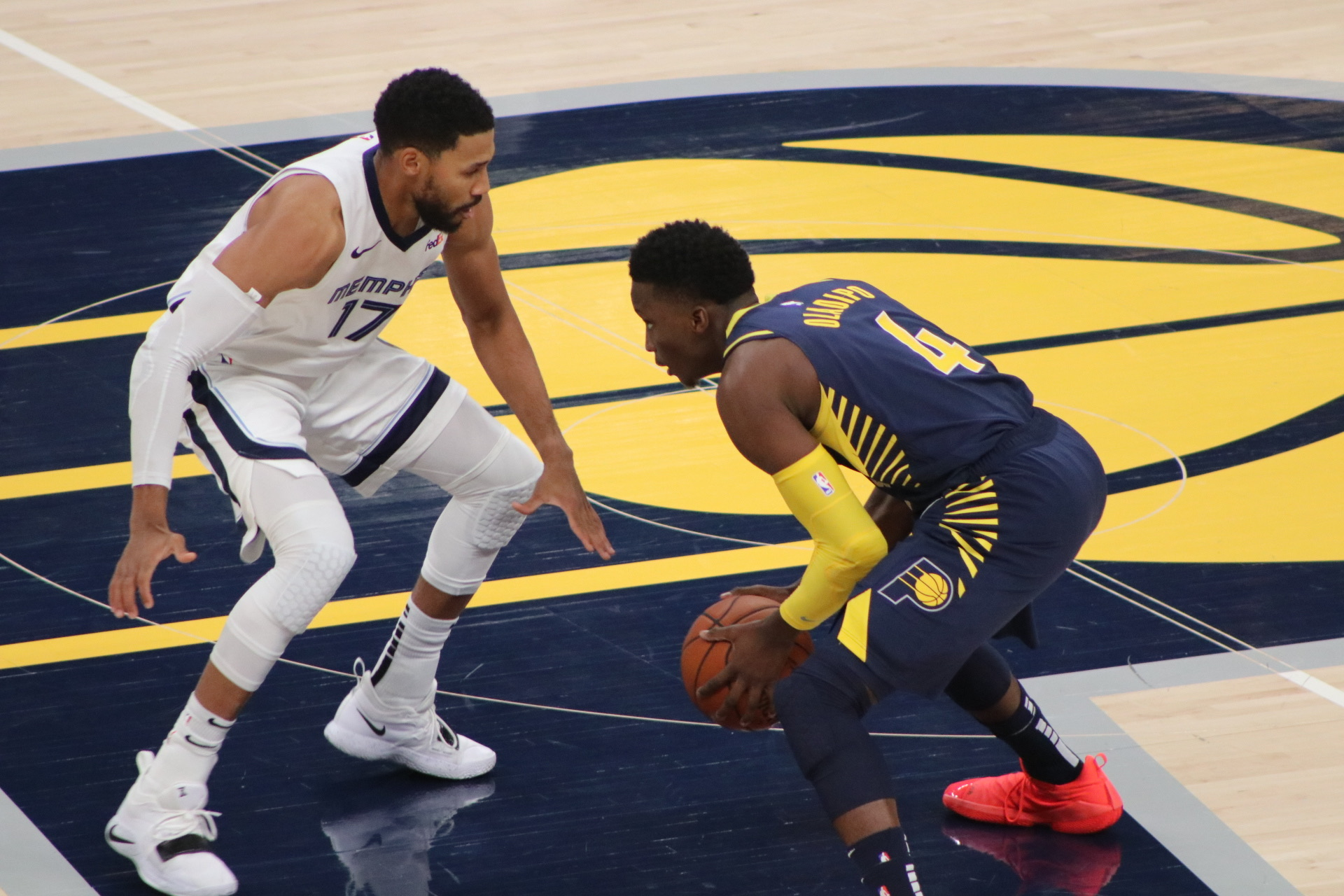
Oladipo against Grizzlies' Garrett Temple in October 2018

On November 3, 2018, Oladipo's 3-pointer with 3.4 seconds remaining gave Indiana a 102–101 comeback victory over the Boston Celtics, as he finished with 24 points and 12 rebounds. On November 17, against the Atlanta Hawks, Oladipo left the game in the first quarter with a right knee injury. He missed 11 games with the injury, returning to action on December 12. On January 4, he scored 36 points and made a 3-pointer from just above the top of the arc with 0.3 seconds left in overtime to lift the Pacers to a 119–116 win over the Chicago Bulls. On January 23 against the Toronto Raptors, Oladipo suffered a ruptured quad tendon in his right knee, which ruled him out for the rest of the season. He underwent successful surgery five days later. Despite the injury-riddled season, Oladipo was selected as an Eastern Conference All-Star reserve.

==== 2019–2021 season ====
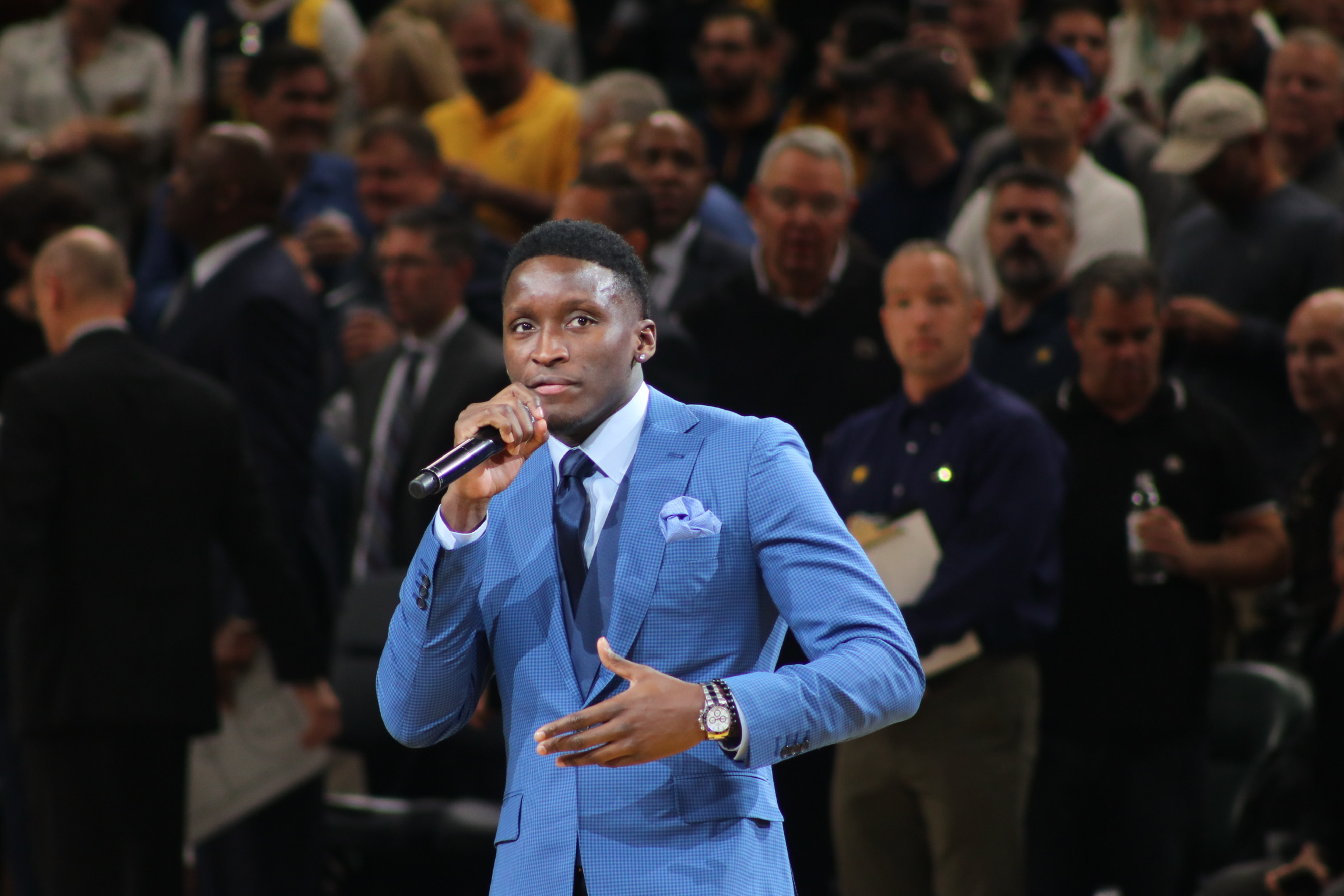
Oladipo in October 2019

On November 12, 2019, the Indiana Pacers announced that they had assigned Oladipo to the Fort Wayne Mad Ants while waiting for his knee to heal; he was recalled to the Pacers the same day, following practice with the Mad Ants.

On January 29, 2020, he made his return to the NBA, 371 days after being injured. Coming off the bench for the Pacers, he scored 9 points in 21 minutes of playing time, including a game-tying three-pointer, in an overtime win over the Chicago Bulls. After the game, an emotional Oladipo dedicated the shot to Kobe Bryant and eight other lives lost in a California helicopter crash, three days prior.

Oladipo initially announced that he would sit out during the restart of the NBA season, but ultimately committed to play after continued rehab of his quadriceps tendon.

=== Houston Rockets (2021) ===
On January 16, 2021, Oladipo was traded to the Houston Rockets as a part of a four-team deal that sent James Harden to the Brooklyn Nets. Two days later, he made his debut and recorded 32 points and 9 assists in a 125–120 loss against Chicago Bulls. In February 2021, Oladipo turned down a two-year, $45.2 million max contract extension, which was the most the Rockets could offer him. Oladipo only played 20 games in total with the Rockets, averaging 21 points, 5 rebounds, and 5 assists.

=== Miami Heat (2021–2023) ===
On March 25, 2021, Oladipo was traded to the Miami Heat, in exchange for Avery Bradley, Kelly Olynyk and a 2022 draft pick swap. On April 1, he made his debut in a 116–109 win over Golden State Warriors, and recorded 6 points, 3 rebounds and 5 assists in 23 minutes. On May 13, Oladipo had season-ending surgery to repair his right quadriceps tendon.

On August 7, 2021, Oladipo re-signed with the Heat on a one-year, veteran's minimum deal. On March 7, 2022, he made his return from injury, putting up 11 points with four assists and one rebound, in a 123–106 win over the Houston Rockets. In the Heat's regular season finale on April 10, Oladipo logged a season-high 40 points, along with 10 rebounds and seven assists, in a 111–125 loss to the Orlando Magic.

On July 7, 2022, Oladipo re-signed with the Heat on a two-year, $18-million deal.

On April 23, 2023, in Game 3 of the first-round playoff series against the Milwaukee Bucks, Oladipo suffered a torn patellar tendon in his left knee, sidelining him for the remainder of the postseason. The Heat would go on to reach the NBA Finals for the second time in four years, losing to the Denver Nuggets in five games.

On July 6, 2023, Oladipo was traded back to the Oklahoma City Thunder, along with two future second-round draft picks, in exchange for cash considerations. The Thunder traded Oladipo and Jeremiah Robinson-Earl to the Houston Rockets on October 17, just before the start of the regular season, for Kevin Porter Jr. and two future second-round draft picks.

On February 1, 2024, before playing for Houston, Oladipo was traded to the Memphis Grizzlies, along with three future second-round picks, in exchange for Steven Adams. One week later, he was waived by the Grizzlies before playing for them.

In October 2025, Oladipo had a brief stint with the Guangzhou Loong Lions of the Chinese Basketball Association, playing in two of the team's games on their NBA preseason tour.

=== Wisconsin Herd (2025–2026) ===
On November 9, 2025, Oladipo joined the Wisconsin Herd of the NBA G League. He was traded to the Cleveland Charge on February 19, 2026, but did not debut for the Charge to finish the 2025–26 season.

== Broadcasting career ==
On October 10, 2024, Oladipo joined ESPN as a sports analyst.

== Career statistics ==
Legend
| GP | Games played | GS | Games started | MPG | Minutes per game |
| FG% | Field goal percentage | 3P% | 3-point field goal percentage | FT% | Free throw percentage |
| RPG | Rebounds per game | APG | Assists per game | SPG | Steals per game |
| BPG | Blocks per game | PPG | Points per game | **Bold** | Career high |
| * | Led the league |

=== NBA ===
==== Regular season ====
| Year | Team | GP | GS | MPG | FG% | 3P% | FT% | RPG | APG | SPG | BPG | PPG |
|---|---|---|---|---|---|---|---|---|---|---|---|---|
| 2013–14 | Orlando | **80** | 44 | 31.1 | .419 | .327 | .780 | 4.1 | 4.1 | 1.6 | .5 | 13.8 |
| 2014–15 | Orlando | 72 | 71 | **35.7** | .436 | .339 | .819 | 4.2 | 4.1 | 1.7 | .3 | 17.9 |
| 2015–16 | Orlando | 72 | 52 | 33.0 | .438 | .348 | **.830** | 4.8 | 3.9 | 1.6 | **.8** | 16.0 |
| 2016–17 | Oklahoma City | 67 | 67 | 33.2 | .442 | .361 | .753 | 4.3 | 2.6 | 1.2 | .3 | 15.9 |
| 2017–18 | Indiana | 75 | **75** | 34.0 | .477 | .371 | .799 | 5.2 | 4.3 | **2.4*** | **.8** | **23.1** |
| 2018–19 | Indiana | 36 | 36 | 31.9 | .423 | .343 | .730 | 5.6 | **5.2** | 1.7 | .3 | 18.8 |
| 2019–20 | Indiana | 19 | 16 | 27.8 | .394 | .317 | .814 | 3.9 | 2.9 | .9 | .2 | 14.5 |
| 2020–21 | Indiana | 9 | 9 | 33.3 | .421 | .362 | .730 | **5.7** | 4.2 | 1.7 | .2 | 20.0 |
| 2020–21 | Houston | 20 | 20 | 33.5 | .407 | .320 | .783 | 4.8 | 5.0 | 1.2 | .5 | 21.2 |
| 2020–21 | Miami | 4 | 4 | 27.8 | .372 | .235 | .667 | 3.5 | 3.5 | 1.8 | .5 | 12.0 |
| 2021–22 | Miami | 8 | 1 | 21.6 | **.479** | **.417** | .737 | 2.9 | 3.5 | .6 | .1 | 12.4 |
| 2022–23 | Miami | 42 | 2 | 26.3 | .397 | .330 | .747 | 3.0 | 3.5 | 1.4 | .3 | 10.7 |
| Career | | 504 | 397 | 32.2 | .436 | .347 | .788 | 4.5 | 3.9 | 1.6 | .5 | 16.9 |
| All-Star | | 1 | 0 | 15.0 | .375 | .167 | .000 | 2.0 | 3.0 | 3.0 | .0 | 7.0 |

==== Playoffs ====
| Year | Team | GP | GS | MPG | FG% | 3P% | FT% | RPG | APG | SPG | BPG | PPG |
|---|---|---|---|---|---|---|---|---|---|---|---|---|
| 2017 | Oklahoma City | 5 | 5 | 36.2 | .344 | .240 | **1.000** | 5.6 | 2.0 | 1.4 | **.6** | 10.8 |
| 2018 | Indiana | 7 | **7** | **37.3** | .417 | **.404** | .732 | **8.3** | **6.0** | **2.4** | .4 | **22.7** |
| 2020 | Indiana | 4 | 4 | 30.8 | .393 | .364 | .938 | 3.3 | 2.5 | 2.3 | .0 | 17.8 |
| 2022 | Miami | **15** | 1 | 24.5 | .368 | .274 | .792 | 3.4 | 2.1 | 1.3 | .3 | 10.6 |
| 2023 | Miami | 2 | 0 | 22.7 | **.526** | .400 | .333 | 3.5 | 1.0 | 1.0 | .5 | 11.5 |
| Career | | 33 | 17 | 29.6 | .391 | .330 | .790 | 4.8 | 2.9 | 1.6 | .3 | 14.1 |

=== College ===
| Year | Team | GP | GS | MPG | FG% | 3P% | FT% | RPG | APG | SPG | BPG | PPG |
|---|---|---|---|---|---|---|---|---|---|---|---|---|
| 2010–11 | Indiana | 32 | 5 | 18.0 | .547 | .308 | .612 | 3.7 | .9 | 1.1 | .2 | 7.4 |
| 2011–12 | Indiana | **36** | 34 | 26.7 | .471 | .208 | **.750** | 5.3 | 2.0 | 1.4 | .6 | 10.8 |
| 2012–13 | Indiana | **36** | **36** | **28.4** | **.599** | **.441** | .746 | **6.3** | **2.1** | **2.2** | **.8** | **13.6** |
| Career | | 104 | 75 | 24.6 | .538 | .338 | .716 | 5.2 | 1.7 | 1.5 | .5 | 10.7 |

== Player profile ==
Oladipo is a shooting guard who is also capable of playing point guard. Indiana coach Tom Crean would frequently attribute Oladipo's success to his extreme work ethic and pre-game preparation of reviewing film. Oladipo is known for entertaining fans with exciting dunks. As announcer Clark Kellogg noted, "Victor Oladipo is like a baby's bottom, smooth and sometimes... explosive."

On offense, Oladipo is capable of aggressively and quickly driving to the basket, aided by his leaping ability. Following a victory by Indiana over #1 ranked Michigan, coach John Beilein remarked, "I've seen a lot of players. I don't know whether I've seen one quicker or faster, more athletic, than Oladipo. It's tough to stay in front of him." His offensive proficiency improved as his outside shooting range improved each year of his collegiate career.

On defense, Oladipo has been described as a "lockdown off-ball defender who can defend multiple positions". He has the quickness to guard point guards and the strength and athleticism to guard a forward if caught in a mismatch. His athleticism and anticipation makes it hard to set a screen on him. He also rebounds well at his position.

== Television appearance ==
In 2019, Oladipo competed in season two of The Masked Singer as "Thingamajig".

== Personal life ==
Oladipo is a devout Catholic. He has a daughter, Naomi, born in 2022.
