= Romero Osby =

American basketball player (born 1990)

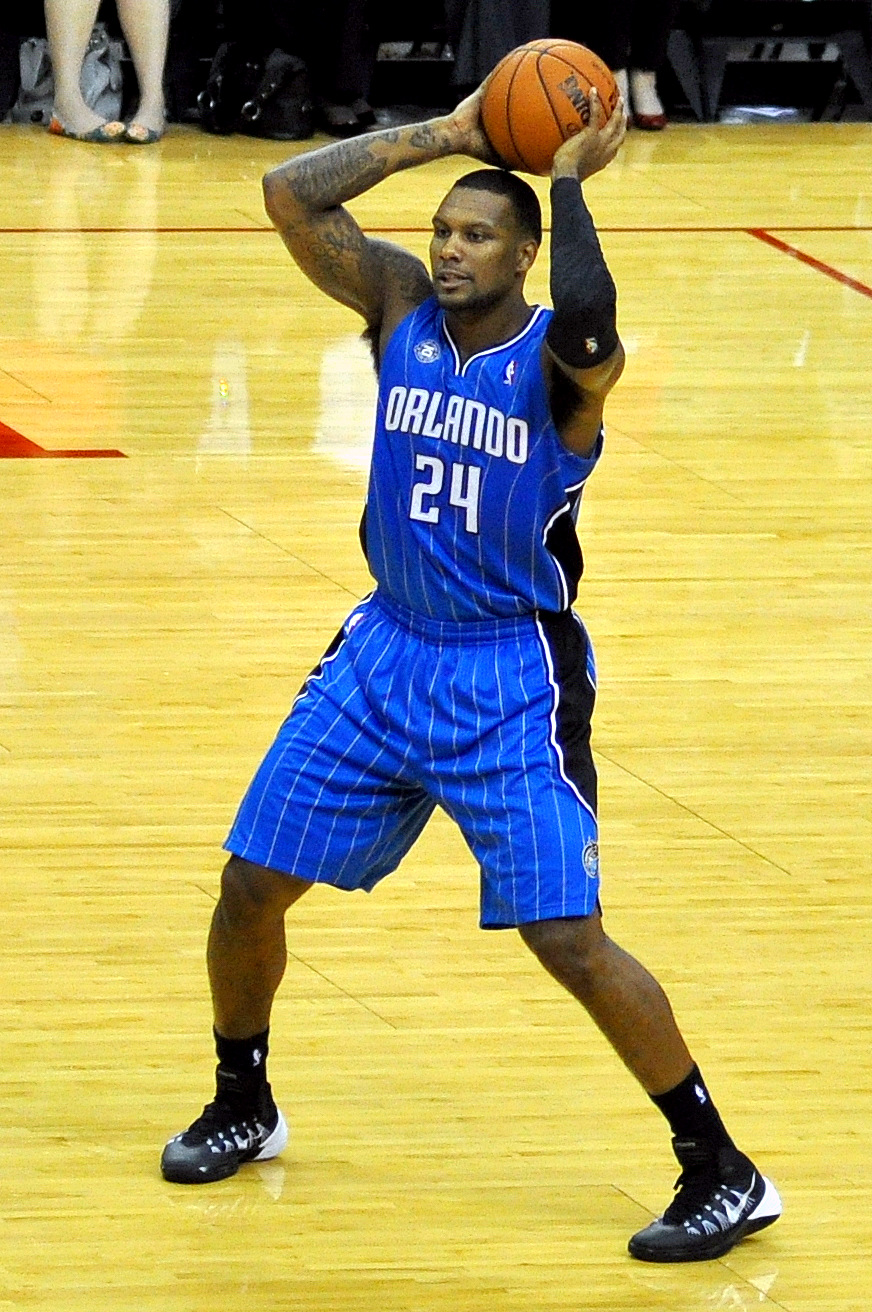
- Osby with the Orlando Magic in 2013

Personal information
- Born: May 7, 1990 (age 36) Frankfurt, West Germany
- Listed height: 6 ft 8 in (2.03 m)
- Listed weight: 232 lb (105 kg)

Career information
- High school: Northeast Lauderdale (Lauderdale, Mississippi)
- College: Mississippi State (2008–2010); Oklahoma (2011–2013)
- NBA draft: 2013: 2nd round, 51st overall pick
- Drafted by: Orlando Magic
- Playing career: 2013–2016
- Position: Small forward

Career history
- 2013–2014: Maine Red Claws
- 2014–2015: Le Mans
- 2015: Maine Red Claws
- 2015: Indios de Mayagüez
- 2015: JSF Nanterre
- 2015: Maccabi Rishon LeZion
- 2015–2016: Maccabi Kiryat Gat

Career highlights
- First-team All-Big 12 (2013)
- Stats at Basketball Reference

Romero Osby (born May 7, 1990) is an American former professional basketball player. He played college basketball for the Mississippi State Bulldogs and Oklahoma Sooners.

== Professional career ==
Osby was selected with the 51st overall pick by the Orlando Magic in the 2013 NBA draft. In July 2013, he joined the Magic for the 2013 NBA Summer League. On September 27, 2013, he signed with the Magic. However, he was later waived on October 25, 2013.

On November 4, 2013, the Fort Wayne Mad Ants, the D-League affiliate of the Magic, traded Osby's rights to the Maine Red Claws. On January 22, 2014, he was waived by the Red Claws due to a season-ending shoulder injury.

In July 2014, Osby re-joined the Orlando Magic for the 2014 NBA Summer League. He later signed with the Le Mans of the LNB Pro A for the 2014–15 season on July 25. After being ruled out for four months in late November with another shoulder injury, Le Mans and Osby finally parted ways on January 5, 2015. On February 5, 2015, he was reacquired by the Maine Red Claws. On April 20, 2015, he signed with Indios de Mayagüez of Puerto Rico for the rest of the 2015 BSN season. On May 29, 2015, he parted ways with Indios de Mayagüez.

On July 28, 2015, he signed with the French club JSF Nanterre. He left Nanterre after appearing in four league games, and on October 21, 2015, he signed with Maccabi Rishon LeZion of Israel. On December 7, 2015, he left Rishon LeZion and signed with Maccabi Kiryat Gat for the rest of the season.
