= Arron Afflalo =

American basketball player (born 1985)

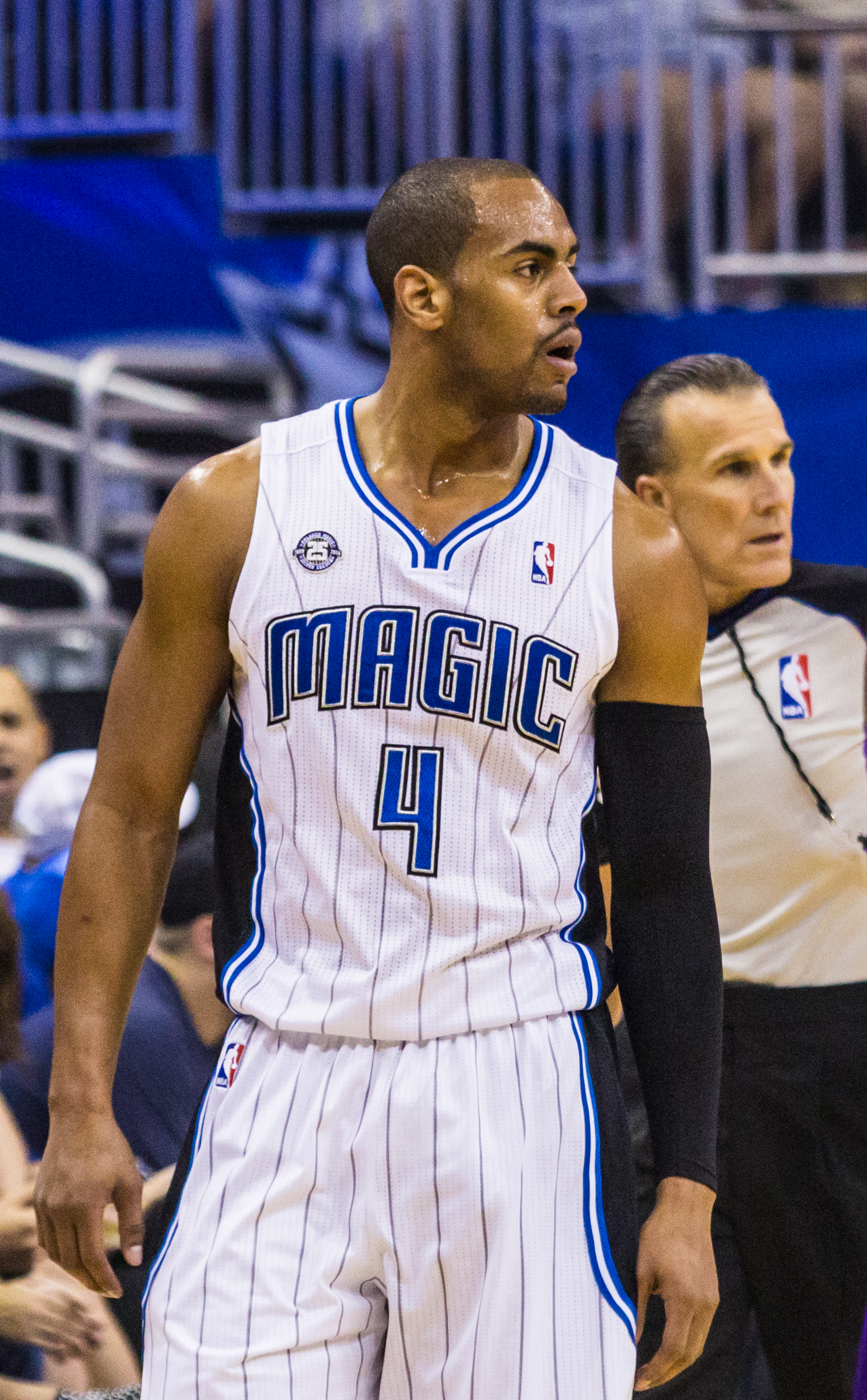
- Afflalo with the Orlando Magic in 2013

Personal information
- Born: October 15, 1985 (age 41) Los Angeles, California, U.S.
- Listed height: 6 ft 5 in (1.96 m)
- Listed weight: 210 lb (95 kg)

Career information
- High school: Centennial (Compton, California)
- College: UCLA (2004–2007)
- NBA draft: 2007: 1st round, 27th overall pick
- Drafted by: Detroit Pistons
- Playing career: 2007–2018
- Position: Shooting guard / small forward
- Number: 28, 6, 4, 10, 40

Career history
- 2007–2009: Detroit Pistons
- 2009–2012: Denver Nuggets
- 2012–2014: Orlando Magic
- 2014–2015: Denver Nuggets
- 2015: Portland Trail Blazers
- 2015–2016: New York Knicks
- 2016–2017: Sacramento Kings
- 2017–2018: Orlando Magic

Career highlights
- Consensus first-team All-American (2007); Pac-10 Player of the Year (2007); 2× First-team All-Pac-10 (2006, 2007); McDonald's All-American (2004); Third-team Parade All-American (2004)

Career statistics
- Points: 8,198 (10.8 ppg)
- Rebounds: 2,176 (2.9 rpg)
- Assists: 1,386 (1.8 apg)
- Stats at NBA.com
- Stats at Basketball Reference

Arron Agustin Afflalo (born October 15, 1985) is an American former professional basketball player in the National Basketball Association (NBA). He played college basketball for the UCLA Bruins. As a junior, he was named a consensus All-American and was voted the player of the year in the Pac-12 Conference. After forgoing his senior year in college, Afflalo was selected in the first round of the 2007 NBA draft by the Detroit Pistons with the 27th overall pick.

== Early life ==
Afflalo was born at the UCLA Medical Center in Los Angeles, California, only a few minutes' walk from Pauley Pavilion, where the UCLA Bruins play their home games. His parents are Benjamin Afflalo and Gwendolyn Washington. He also has a younger sister named Paris. Afflalo has grandparents from Jamaica and is also of Portuguese and Moroccan descent. He is named after the Biblical figure Aaron, but his mother changed the spelling to make it unique.

Afflalo's parents did not marry and separated when he was three. He lived with his mother until the age of 13 and then moved into his father's house in Compton, California. Afflalo grew up as a fan of the Los Angeles Lakers, and his favourite player was Byron Scott; Afflalo wore a #4 jersey in honor of Scott, who used the same number.

As a senior in the 2003–04 season, Afflalo helped lead Centennial High School to a California Division III title.

Considered a five-star recruit by Rivals.com, Afflalo was listed as the No. 6 shooting guard and the No. 26 player in the nation in 2004.

== College career ==
As a collegiate player for UCLA, Afflalo's defensive dominance throughout the 2006–07 season (one example being holding Cal's Ayinde Ubaka to zero points in one of the two teams' matchups), and his 17.4 points per game, led to him being voted the Pac-10 Player of the Year by the other coaches in the conference. He also set the then-school record for most three-point field goals made (87) in a season. (Note: The record stood for eight years until Bryce Alford broke it in 2015.) Commenting on the award, Afflalo said, "It is good that contributions on both ends of the floor are recognized ... If you truly have a love and passion for the game, then you should work at every aspect of it, not just the part that gives you [attention], that being scoring."

=== NCAA tournament ===
In a 2006 NCAA tournament game against Alabama, Afflalo hit the game-winning three-point shot and also defended Alabama point guard Ronald Steele on his errant three-point attempt, which would have given Alabama the lead.

In the Bruins' 2006 Sweet Sixteen comeback victory over Gonzaga, Afflalo and teammate Ryan Hollins, in what was later widely hailed as a classy move, helped the distraught Gonzaga star Adam Morrison off the court after the final buzzer sounded. Against Memphis in the Elite Eight, Afflalo was noted by many to be largely responsible for stopping Rodney Carney and helping UCLA advance to the Final Four.

In the 2007 NCAA Tournament, he was named the West Regional's Most Outstanding Player after scoring 24 points and making several big plays in a 68–55 victory over the Kansas Jayhawks. However, his quick foul trouble against the Florida Gators cost his team the ability to successfully compete, and the Bruins ended up bowing out of the tournament.

== Professional career ==
=== Detroit Pistons (2007–2009) ===
On June 28, 2007, Afflalo was drafted with the 27th overall pick in the 2007 NBA draft by the Detroit Pistons and later signed July 6. In a surprising turn of events, Afflalo made his first career NBA start on November 1, 2007, the opening night of his rookie season, when Richard Hamilton missed the first two games to attend the birth of his son. Afflalo started the team's first and second games during his rookie campaign that culminated with a loss to the Boston Celtics in the Eastern Conference Finals of the 2008 NBA Playoffs.

On February 14, 2009, Afflalo helped Team Detroit to its second victory in three years at the Shooting Stars Competition during the 2009 NBA All-Star Weekend in Phoenix, Arizona. Afflalo teamed with Detroit Shock head coach and former NBA legend Bill Laimbeer, and Shock guard Katie Smith to get the win against Team Phoenix in the final.

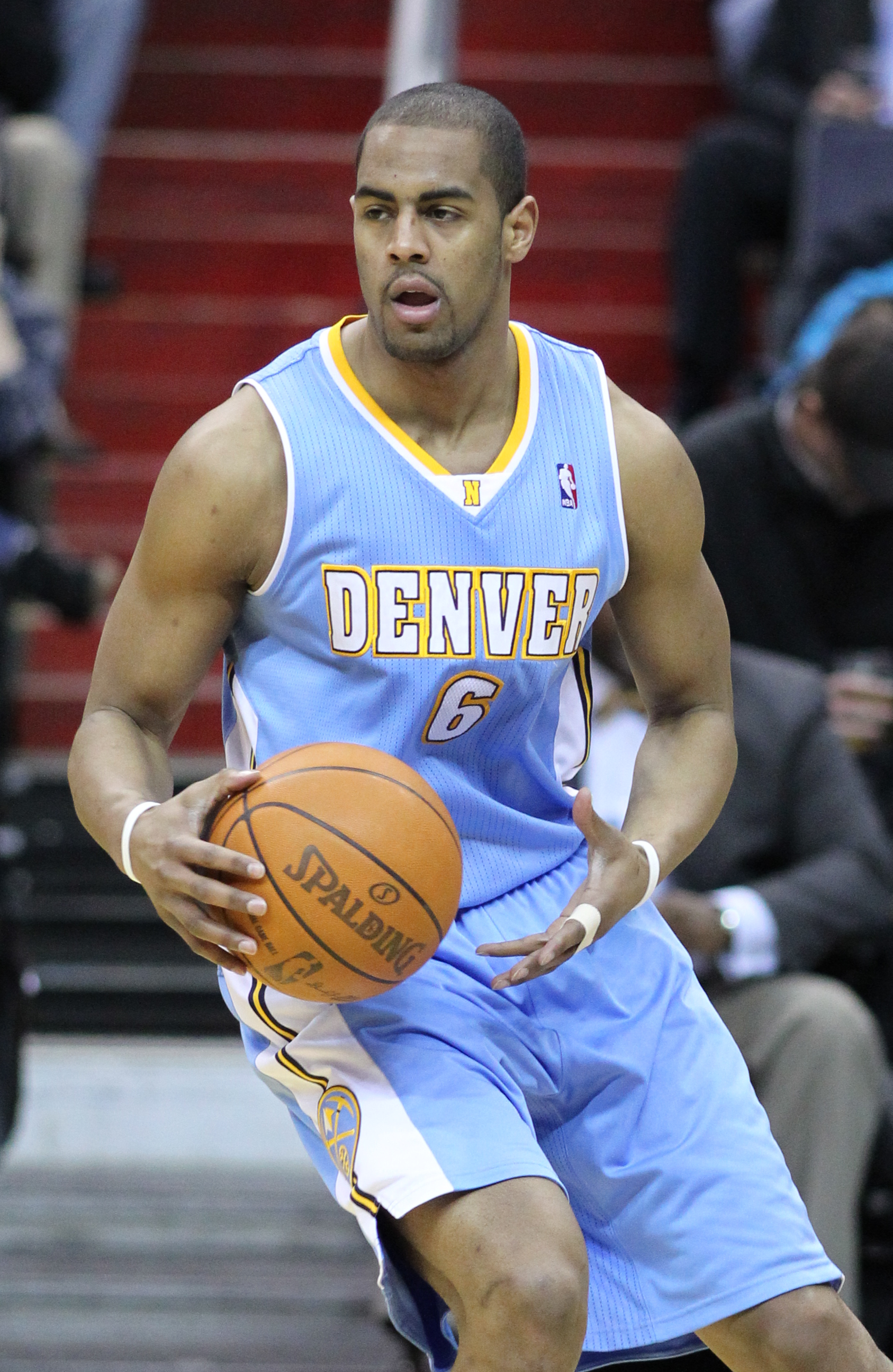
Afflalo with the Denver Nuggets in 2011

=== Denver Nuggets (2009–2012) ===
On July 13, 2009, he was traded along with Walter Sharpe to the Denver Nuggets in exchange for a second-round pick in the 2011 NBA draft and cash. The draft pick became the 52nd overall pick and was used by the Pistons to draft Vernon Macklin.

On February 10, 2011, Afflalo made a 20-foot jump shot at the buzzer over Shawn Marion as the Nuggets defeated the eventual NBA champion Dallas Mavericks 121–120, in a game that would be Carmelo Anthony’s final Denver home game. The Nuggets trailed by as many as 13 in the 4th quarter and were down 119–110 with under 2 minutes to play before pulling off a miraculous upset victory. Afflalo had 19 points in the fourth quarter alone to almost single-handedly power Denver to the win, ending Dallas’ ten game win streak.

=== Orlando Magic (2012–2014) ===
On August 10, 2012, he was traded to the Orlando Magic in a four-team deal which sent Dwight Howard to the Los Angeles Lakers, Andrew Bynum to the Philadelphia 76ers, and Andre Iguodala to the Nuggets.

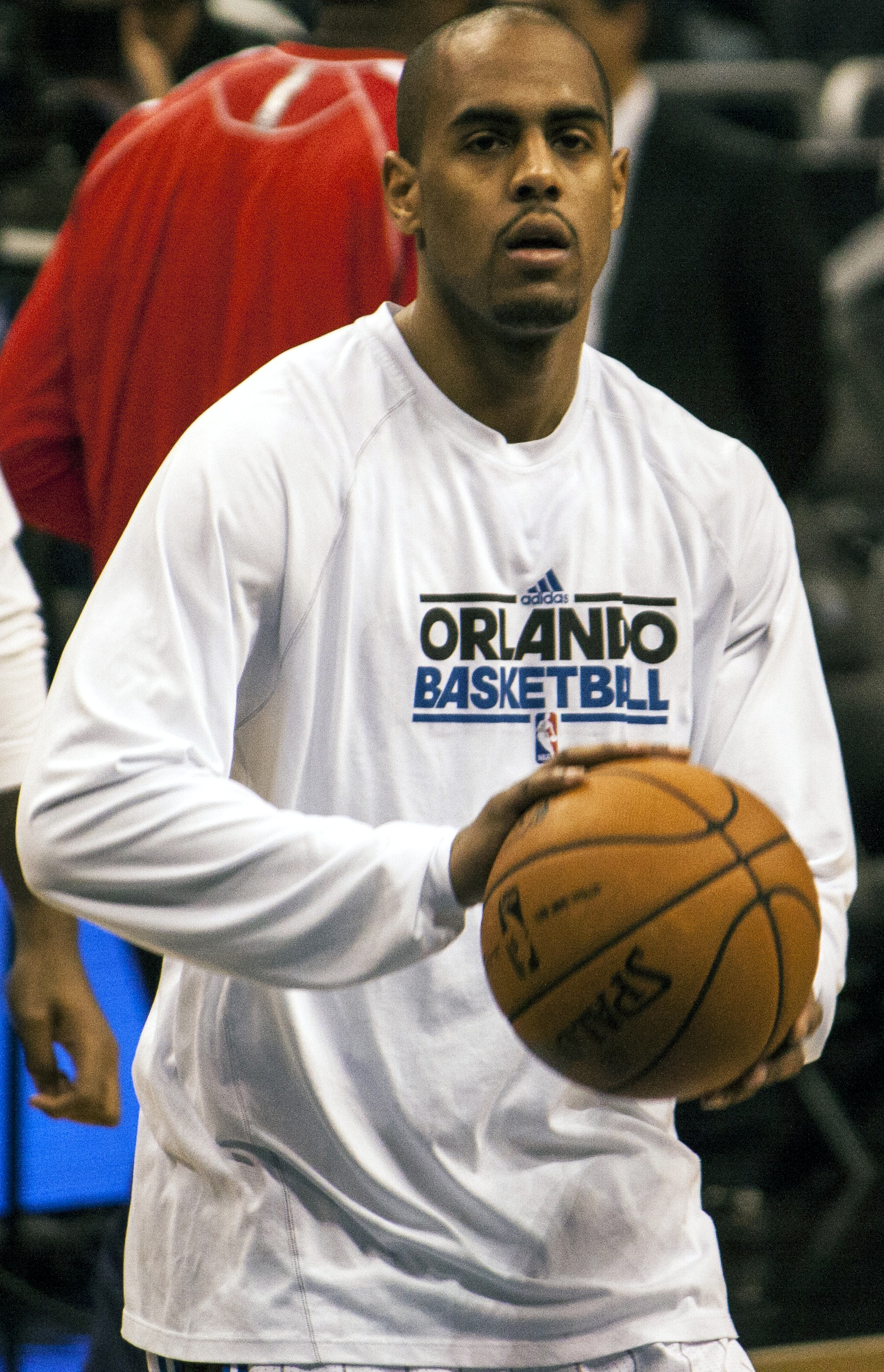
Afflalo with the Orlando Magic in 2012

On December 3, 2013, he recorded a career-high 43 points and minutes with 52, in a double-overtime loss to the Philadelphia 76ers. His previous career-high in points came just less than a month earlier with 36 points against the Milwaukee Bucks on November 13, where he also made a career-high 8 three-point shots.

=== Return to the Nuggets (2014–2015) ===
On June 26, 2014, Afflalo was traded back to the Denver Nuggets in exchange for Evan Fournier and the draft rights to Devyn Marble. Afflalo, arguably Orlando's best player in 2013–14, was dealt to avoid concerns that he would opt out of his contract following the 2014–15 season and assured the Magic value in return. The transaction also cleared $6 million in cap space for the team.

On October 29, 2014, Afflalo made his return for the Nuggets, recording 15 points and four rebounds in the season opening 89–79 win over the Detroit Pistons.

=== Portland Trail Blazers (2015) ===
On February 19, 2015, Afflalo was traded, along with Alonzo Gee, to the Portland Trail Blazers in exchange for Will Barton, Víctor Claver, Thomas Robinson, and a lottery-protected 2016 first-round pick.

=== New York Knicks (2015–2016) ===
On July 9, 2015, Afflalo signed with the New York Knicks. The move reunited him with his former Denver Nuggets teammate Carmelo Anthony. Afflalo missed the first eight games of the regular season with hamstring issues, making his debut for the Knicks on November 11 against the Charlotte Hornets. In 28 minutes as a starter, he recorded 12 points and 6 rebounds in a 95–93 loss. Over his first nine games for the Knicks, Afflalo averaged just 11.2 points per game. He went on to score a season-high 31 points in an overtime loss to the Houston Rockets on November 29. He topped that mark with 38 points against the Atlanta Hawks on January 3, hitting 14-of-17 from the field and 7-of-8 from three-point range.

=== Sacramento Kings (2016–2017) ===
On July 9, 2016, Afflalo signed with the Sacramento Kings. On June 23, 2017, he was waived by the Kings.

=== Return to Orlando (2017–2018) ===
On July 27, 2017, Afflalo signed with the Orlando Magic, returning to the franchise for a second stint. On January 16, 2018, Afflalo was involved in an on-court fight with the Minnesota Timberwolves' Nemanja Bjelica; he took a swing on Bjelica but Bjelica evaded it and put Afflalo in a headlock to calm him down. Afflalo later received a two-game suspension for his actions. Afflalo finished the season with career-lows of 3.4 points, 1.2 rebounds and 0.6 assists over 53 games.

== Career statistics ==
Legend
GP	Games played	GS	Games started	MPG	Minutes per game
FG%	Field goal percentage	3P%	3-point field goal percentage	FT%	Free throw percentage
RPG	Rebounds per game	APG	Assists per game	SPG	Steals per game
BPG	Blocks per game	PPG	Points per game	**Bold**	Career high
*	Led the league

=== NBA ===
==== Regular season ====
Year	Team	GP	GS	MPG	FG%	3P%	FT%	RPG	APG	SPG	BPG	PPG
2007–08	Detroit	75	9	12.9	.411	.208	.782	1.8	.7	.4	.1	3.7
2008–09	Detroit	74	8	16.7	.437	.402	.817	1.8	.6	.4	.2	4.9
2009–10	Denver	**82***	**75**	27.1	.465	**.434**	.735	3.1	1.7	**.6**	**.4**	8.8
2010–11	Denver	69	69	33.7	**.498**	.423	.847	3.6	2.4	.5	**.4**	12.6
2011–12	Denver	62	62	33.6	.471	.398	.798	3.2	2.4	**.6**	.2	15.2
2012–13	Orlando	64	64	**36.0**	.439	.300	.857	**3.7**	3.2	**.6**	.2	16.5
2013–14	Orlando	73	73	35.0	.459	.427	.815	3.6	**3.4**	.5	.0	**18.2**
2014–15	Denver	53	53	33.0	.428	.337	.841	3.4	1.9	**.6**	.1	14.5
2014–15	Portland	25	19	30.1	.414	.400	.851	2.7	1.1	.4	.1	10.6
2015–16	New York	71	57	33.4	.443	.382	.840	**3.7**	2.0	.4	.1	12.8
2016–17	Sacramento	61	45	25.9	.440	.411	**.892**	2.0	1.3	.3	.1	8.4
2017–18	Orlando	53	3	12.9	.401	.386	.846	1.2	.6	.1	.2	3.4
Career		762	537	27.3	.450	.386	.825	2.9	1.8	.4	.2	10.8

==== Playoffs ====
Year	Team	GP	GS	MPG	FG%	3P%	FT%	RPG	APG	SPG	BPG	PPG
2008	Detroit	**12**	0	7.0	.389	.000	.000	.4	.5	.3	.0	1.2
2009	Detroit	4	0	16.5	.476	.200	.600	.8	.3	.0	**.5**	6.3
2010	Denver	6	6	20.0	**.625**	**.429**	.818	2.0	1.2	.2	.3	9.2
2011	Denver	3	3	28.3	.353	.250	**.875**	3.0	2.3	.0	.0	**11.3**
2012	Denver	7	**7**	**32.7**	.405	.200	.800	**3.6**	**2.7**	**.7**	.3	10.9
2015	Portland	3	3	20.0	.167	.250	.000	2.3	.7	.0	.0	1.7
Career		35	19	18.4	.424	.258	.775	1.7	1.2	.3	.2	6.0

=== College ===
Year	Team	GP	GS	MPG	FG%	3P%	FT%	RPG	APG	SPG	BPG	PPG
2004–05	UCLA	29	29	31.3	.442	**.386**	.708	3.3	**2.2**	.6	**.2**	10.8
2005–06	UCLA	**39**	**38**	**33.4**	**.462**	.366	**.806**	**4.2**	1.8	.6	.1	15.8
2006–07	UCLA	36	36	32.9	.461	.375	.802	2.8	1.9	.6	**.2**	**16.9**
Career		104	103	32.7	.457	.373	.781	3.5	1.9	.6	.2	14.8

== Personal life ==
Afflalo attended Centennial High School two years ahead of rapper Kendrick Lamar, who credited Afflalo's academic and athletic achievements in the first verse of the song "Black Boy Fly", a bonus track from his album Good Kid, M.A.A.D City. In the song, Lamar described Afflalo as an example of someone who had the "determination, ambition plus dedication and wisdom" to get out of Compton.

Afflalo nodded towards Lamar's drive in an interview with XXL, saying "I was almost like the golden child in the city of Compton, or at least at Centennial at that time, considering where I was as a basketball player, and all the positivity I had around me, in terms of school and people appreciating me and showing me love for what I did on the court and in the community at that time in my life. So for him to kind of be in the background and who he is today, it showed you the perseverance that he had for so many years."
