= 2013–14 Charlotte Bobcats season =

NBA professional basketball team season

- Head coach: Steve Clifford
- President: Rod Higgins
- General manager: Rich Cho
- Owner: Michael Jordan
- Arena: Time Warner Cable Arena

Results
- Record: 43–39 (.524)
- Place: Division: 3rd (Southeast); Conference: 7th (Eastern)
- Playoff finish: First Round (lost to Heat 0–4)
- Stats at Basketball Reference

Local media
- Television: Fox Sports Carolinas, SportSouth
- Radio: WFNZ

The 2013–14 Charlotte Bobcats season was the 24th season of the franchise in the National Basketball Association (NBA). It was also the 10th and final season under the Bobcats name. The Bobcats reached the playoffs for the first time since 2010 and were swept by the two-time defending champion and eventual Eastern Conference champion Miami Heat in the first round. Like in 2010, the Bobcats were swept in the first round. Starting with the 2014–15 NBA season, the franchise reclaimed the name and history of the city's original NBA franchise, the Hornets.

== Key dates ==
- June 27: The 2013 NBA draft took place at the Barclays Center in Brooklyn, New York.
- July 1: 2013 NBA free agency begins.

== Draft picks ==
Round	Pick	Player	Nationality	Position	College/club team
1	4	Cody Zeller	PF/C	United States	Indiana

The Bobcats entered the draft with one first-round pick. Despite having the second-best odds to land the No. 1 overall pick, the team's pick slid to fourth. They had also previously traded their second-round pick to the Oklahoma City Thunder in 2011. This was the franchise's last draft appearance under the Charlotte Bobcats name as they would be rebranded as the Hornets the following year.

== Future draft picks ==
=== Credits ===
2014 first-round draft pick from Portland

Portland's 1st-round pick to Charlotte (top-12 protected in 2014 and 2015, and unprotected in 2016). [Charlotte–Portland, February 24, 2011]

2014 first-round draft pick from Detroit

Detroit's 1st-round pick to Charlotte (top-8 protected in 2014, top-1 protected in 2015, and unprotected in 2016). [Charlotte–Detroit, June 26, 2012]

=== Debits ===
2014 first-round draft pick to Chicago

Charlotte's 1st-round pick to Chicago (top-10 protected in 2014, top-8 in 2015, and unprotected in 2016). [Charlotte–Chicago, February 18, 2010]

2016 second-round draft pick to San Antonio

Charlotte's 2016 2nd-round pick to San Antonio protected for selections 31 to 55 (if this pick falls within its protected range and is therefore not conveyed, then Charlotte's obligation to San Antonio will be extinguished) [Charlotte–San Antonio, February 18, 2010]

== Roster ==
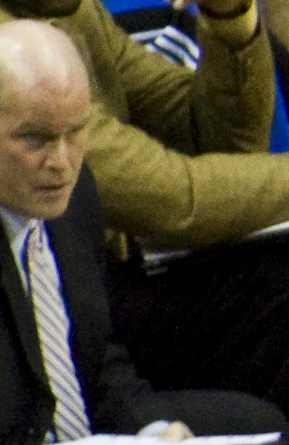
Steve Clifford became the head coach for the Bobcats in the 2013–14 season.

2013–14 Charlotte Bobcats roster
Players

Pos.	No.	Player	Height	Weight	DOB	From
F/C	0	Bismack Biyombo	6 ft 9 in (2.06 m)	245 lb (111 kg)	1992-08-28	DR Congo
G/F	55	Chris Douglas-Roberts	6 ft 7 in (2.01 m)	200 lb (91 kg)	1987-01-08	Memphis
C	33	Brendan Haywood	7 ft 0 in (2.13 m)	263 lb (119 kg)	1979-11-27	North Carolina
G/F	9	Gerald Henderson	6 ft 5 in (1.96 m)	215 lb (98 kg)	1987-12-09	Duke
F/C	25	Al Jefferson	6 ft 10 in (2.08 m)	289 lb (131 kg)	1985-01-04	Prentiss HS (MS)
F	14	Michael Kidd-Gilchrist	6 ft 7 in (2.01 m)	232 lb (105 kg)	1993-09-26	Kentucky
F/C	11	Josh McRoberts	6 ft 10 in (2.08 m)	240 lb (109 kg)	1987-02-28	Duke
G	12	Gary Neal	6 ft 4 in (1.93 m)	210 lb (95 kg)	1984-10-03	Towson
G	5	Jannero Pargo	6 ft 1 in (1.85 m)	185 lb (84 kg)	1979-10-22	Arkansas
G	13	Luke Ridnour	6 ft 2 in (1.88 m)	175 lb (79 kg)	1981-02-13	Oregon
G/F	44	Jeffery Taylor	6 ft 7 in (2.01 m)	225 lb (102 kg)	1989-05-23	Vanderbilt
F	43	Anthony Tolliver	6 ft 8 in (2.03 m)	240 lb (109 kg)	1985-06-01	Creighton
G	15	Kemba Walker	6 ft 1 in (1.85 m)	184 lb (83 kg)	1990-05-08	Connecticut
F	8	D. J. White	6 ft 9 in (2.06 m)	250 lb (113 kg)	1986-08-31	Indiana
F/C	40	Cody Zeller	7 ft 0 in (2.13 m)	240 lb (109 kg)	1992-10-05	Indiana

Coaches
Head coach
- Steve Clifford
Assistant(s)
- Patrick Ewing
- Stephen Silas
- Bob Beyer
- Mark Price
- Bob Weiss

Legend
- (DP) Unsigned draft pick
- (FA) Free agent
- (S) Suspended
- (DL) On assignment to D-League affiliate
- Injured

== Preseason ==
2013 pre-season game log
Total: 5–3 (home: 2–2; road: 3–1)
Pre-season: 5–3 (home: 2–2; road: 3–1)

Game	Date	Team	Score	High points	High rebounds	High assists	Location Attendance	Record
1	October 8	Atlanta	L 85–87	Ramon Sessions (17)	Al Jefferson (9)	Ramon Sessions (6)	U.S. Cellular Center; 4,457	0–1
2	October 11	@ Miami	L 75–86	Al Jefferson (11)	Al Jefferson (7)	Ramon Sessions (6)	Sprint Center; 18,770	0–2
3	October 12	@ Milwaukee	W 83–76	Jannero Pargo (24)	Bismack Biyombo (21)	Ramon Sessions (4)	BMO Harris Bradley Center; 7,839	1–2
4	October 15	@ Cleveland	W 92–74	Kemba Walker (14)	Bismack Biyombo (11)	Kemba Walker (5)	Canton Memorial Civic Center; 4,047	2–2
5	October 17	Philadelphia	W 110–84	Ben Gordon (22)	Bismack Biyombo (7)	Ramon Sessions (6)	Time Warner Cable Arena; 16,283	3–2
6	October 19	Dallas	L 83–89	Cody Zeller (14)	Bismack Biyombo (13)	Ramon Sessions (6)	Greensboro Coliseum; 7,678	3–3
7	October 24	Cleveland	W 105–92	Jeffery Taylor (20)	Cody Zeller (8)	McRoberts, Henderson, Walker (5)	Time Warner Cable Arena; 5,936	4–3
8	October 25	@ New York	W 85–83	Josh McRoberts (19)	Bismack Biyombo (20)	Kemba Walker (6)	Madison Square Garden; 19,812	5–3

2013–14 season schedule

== Regular season ==
=== Season standings ===
Southeast Division	W	L	PCT	GB	Home	Road	Div	GP
y-Miami Heat	54	28	.659	–	32‍–‍9	22‍–‍19	12–4	82
x-Washington Wizards	44	38	.537	10.0	22‍–‍19	22‍–‍19	10–6	82
x-Charlotte Bobcats	43	39	.524	11.0	25‍–‍16	18‍–‍23	6–10	82
x-Atlanta Hawks	38	44	.463	16.0	24‍–‍17	14‍–‍27	8–8	82
Orlando Magic	23	59	.280	31.0	19‍–‍22	4‍–‍37	4–12	82

Eastern Conference
#	Team	W	L	PCT	GB	GP
1	c-Indiana Pacers *	56	26	.683	–	82
2	y-Miami Heat *	54	28	.659	2.0	82
3	y-Toronto Raptors *	48	34	.585	8.0	82
4	x-Chicago Bulls	48	34	.585	8.0	82
5	x-Washington Wizards	44	38	.537	12.0	82
6	x-Brooklyn Nets	44	38	.537	12.0	82
7	x-Charlotte Bobcats	43	39	.524	13.0	82
8	x-Atlanta Hawks	38	44	.463	18.0	82
9	New York Knicks	37	45	.451	19.0	82
10	Cleveland Cavaliers	33	49	.402	23.0	82
11	Detroit Pistons	29	53	.354	27.0	82
12	Boston Celtics	25	57	.305	31.0	82
13	Orlando Magic	23	59	.280	33.0	82
14	Philadelphia 76ers	19	63	.232	37.0	82
15	Milwaukee Bucks	15	67	.183	41.0	82

=== Game log ===
2013–14 game log
Total: 43–39 (home: 25–16; road: 18–23)
October: 0–1 (home: 0–0; road: 0–1)

Game	Date	Team	Score	High points	High rebounds	High assists	Location Attendance	Record
1	October 30	@ Houston	L 83–96	Josh McRoberts (15)	Kidd-Gilchrist & Jefferson (8)	Kemba Walker (5)	Toyota Center; 18,083	0–1

November : 8–8 (home: 4–6; road: 4–2)

Game	Date	Team	Score	High points	High rebounds	High assists	Location Attendance	Record
2	November 1	Cleveland	W 90–84	Kemba Walker (23)	Bismack Biyombo (10)	Josh McRoberts (8)	Time Warner Cable Arena; 18,017	1–1
3	November 2	@ New Orleans	L 84–105	Ramon Sessions (22)	Jeff Adrien (13)	Ramon Sessions (6)	New Orleans Arena; 15,232	1–2
4	November 5	@ New York	W 102–97	Kemba Walker (25)	Kidd-Gilchrist, Henderson, Adrien (8)	Kemba Walker (6)	Madison Square Garden; 19,812	2–2
5	November 6	Toronto	W 92–90	Gerald Henderson (23)	Bismack Biyombo (11)	Kemba Walker (7)	Time Warner Cable Arena; 11,118	3–2
6	November 8	New York	L 91–101	Kemba Walker (25)	Bismack Biyombo (11)	Kemba Walker (5)	Time Warner Cable Arena; 16,465	3–3
7	November 11	Atlanta	L 94–103	Josh McRoberts (19)	Al Jefferson (7)	Josh McRoberts (7)	Time Warner Cable Arena; 13,996	3–4
8	November 13	@ Boston	W 89–83	Al Jefferson (22)	Al Jefferson (11)	Gerald Henderson (5)	TD Garden; 17,032	4–4
9	November 15	@ Cleveland	W 86–80	Michael Kidd-Gilchrist (16)	Bismack Biyombo (12)	Walker & Sessions (7)	Quicken Loans Arena; 18,679	5–4
10	November 16	Miami	L 81–97	Kemba Walker (22)	Bismack Biyombo (8)	Josh McRoberts (9)	Time Warner Cable Arena; 19,084	5–5
11	November 18	@ Chicago	L 81–86	Jeffery Taylor (20)	Gerald Henderson (8)	Gerald Henderson (6)	United Center; 21,628	5–6
12	November 20	Brooklyn	W 95–91	Kemba Walker (31)	Jeff Adrien (10)	Henderson, McRoberts (5)	Time Warner Cable Arena; 13,843	6–6
13	November 22	Phoenix	L 91–98	Gerald Henderson (17)	Cody Zeller (9)	Kemba Walker (6)	Time Warner Cable Arena; 14,916	6–7
14	November 23	@ Milwaukee	W 96–72	Al Jefferson (19)	Jeff Adrien (10)	Ramon Sessions (6)	BMO Harris Bradley Center; 14,871	7–7
15	November 25	Boston	L 86–96	Kemba Walker (28)	Josh McRoberts (7)	Josh McRoberts (5)	Time Warner Cable Arena; 13,558	7–8
16	November 27	Indiana	L 74–99	Al Jefferson (16)	Al Jefferson (9)	Kemba Walker (3)	Time Warner Cable Arena; 15,170	7–9
17	November 29	Milwaukee	W 92–76	Al Jefferson (23)	Bismack Biyombo (14)	Josh McRoberts (4)	Time Warner Cable Arena; 15,081	8–9

December : 6–9 (home: 4–4; road: 2–5)

Game	Date	Team	Score	High points	High rebounds	High assists	Location Attendance	Record
18	December 1	@ Miami	L 98–99	Kemba Walker (27)	Al Jefferson (13)	Kemba Walker (6)	American Airlines Arena; 19,617	8–10
19	December 3	@ Dallas	L 82–89	Al Jefferson (19)	Al Jefferson (12)	Kemba Walker (5)	American Airlines Center; 19,612	8–11
20	December 6	Philadelphia	W 105–88	Jeff Taylor (21)	Al Jefferson (12)	Kemba Walker (10)	Time Warner Cable Arena; 14,088	9–11
21	December 9	Golden State	W 115–111	Kemba Walker (31)	Josh McRoberts (10)	Josh McRoberts (6)	Time Warner Cable Arena; 13,129	10–11
22	December 11	Orlando	L 83–92	Gerald Henderson (12)	Al Jefferson (11)	Ben Gordon (5)	Time Warner Cable Arena; 11,377	10–12
23	December 13	@ Indiana	L 94–99	Al Jefferson (21)	Al Jefferson (9)	Gerald Henderson (4)	Bankers Life Fieldhouse; 18,165	10–13
24	December 14	L.A. Lakers	L 85–88	Kemba Walker (24)	Al Jefferson (9)	Kemba Walker (8)	Time Warner Cable Arena; 17,101	10–14
25	December 17	Sacramento	W 95–87	Kemba Walker (24)	Jefferson & Biyombo (9)	Ramon Sessions (6)	Time Warner Cable Arena; 11,339	11–14
26	December 18	@ Toronto	W 104–102	Kemba Walker (29)	Al Jefferson (11)	Josh McRoberts (7)	Air Canada Centre; 15,201	12–14
27	December 20	@ Detroit	W 116–106	Kemba Walker (34)	Al Jefferson (14)	Josh McRoberts (7)	Palace of Auburn Hills; 12,453	13–14
28	December 21	Utah	L 85–88	Kemba Walker (20)	Al Jefferson (11)	Kemba Walker (4)	Time Warner Cable Arena; 18,078	13–15
29	December 23	Milwaukee	W 111–110 (OT)	Al Jefferson (26)	Jefferson & Walker (9)	Kemba Walker (10)	Time Warner Cable Arena; 13,534	14–15
30	December 27	Oklahoma City	L 85–89	Kemba Walker (18)	Al Jefferson (11)	McRoberts & Walker (7)	Time Warner Cable Arena; 18,129	14–16
31	December 28	@ Atlanta	L 116–118 (OT)	Al Jefferson (24)	Al Jefferson (23)	Josh McRoberts (9)	Philips Arena; 15,180	14–17
32	December 30	@ Utah	L 80–83	Gerald Henderson (19)	Al Jefferson (10)	Kemba Walker (4)	EnergySolutions Arena; 19,125	14–18

January : 7–9 (home: 3–3; road: 4–6)

Game	Date	Team	Score	High points	High rebounds	High assists	Location Attendance	Record
33	January 1	@ L.A. Clippers	L 85–112	Jefferson & Walker (14)	Al Jefferson (12)	McRoberts, Jefferson & Sessions (4)	Staples Center; 19,160	14–19
34	January 2	@ Portland	L 104–134	Chris Douglas-Roberts (20)	Jefferson & Zeller (5)	Walker & Sessions (3)	Moda Center; 20,014	14–20
35	January 4	@ Sacramento	W 113–103	Kemba Walker (30)	Josh McRoberts (11)	Kemba Walker (6)	Sleep Train Arena; 16,410	15–20
36	January 7	Washington	L 83–97	Gerald Henderson (27)	Al Jefferson (10)	Kemba Walker (8)	Time Warner Cable Arena; 12,079	15–21
37	January 10	@ Minnesota	L 92–119	Anthony Tolliver (21)	Jefferson & Biyombo (7)	Kemba Walker (7)	Target Center; 13,767	15–22
38	January 11	@ Chicago	L 97–103	Gerald Henderson Jr. (30)	Al Jefferson (11)	Kemba Walker (5)	United Center; 21,413	15–23
39	January 14	New York	W 108–98	Al Jefferson (35)	Al Jefferson (8)	Kemba Walker & Ramon Sessions (5)	Time Warner Cable Arena; 15,156	16–23
40	January 15	@ Philadelphia	L 92–95	Kemba Walker (26)	Al Jefferson (8)	Kemba Walker (8)	Wells Fargo Center; 10,106	16–24
41	January 17	@ Orlando	W 111–101	Al Jefferson (30)	Al Jefferson (16)	Kemba Walker (10)	Amway Center; 16,164	17–24
42	January 18	Miami	L 96–104 (OT)	Al Jefferson (22)	Al Jefferson (14)	Kemba Walker (8)	Time Warner Cable Arena; 19,631	17–25
43	January 20	Toronto	W 100–95	Ramon Sessions (23)	Al Jefferson (19)	Al Jefferson (7)	Time Warner Cable Arena; 14,929	18–25
44	January 22	L.A. Clippers	W 95–91	Al Jefferson (24)	Al Jefferson (10)	Ramon Sessions (8)	Time Warner Cable Arena; 14,760	19–25
45	January 24	@ New York	L 96–125	Al Jefferson (25)	Al Jefferson (9)	Jannero Pargo (8)	Madison Square Garden; 19,812	19–26
46	January 25	Chicago	L 87–89	Al Jefferson (32)	Al Jefferson (13)	Ramon Sessions (11)	Time Warner Cable Arena; 18,252	19–27
47	January 29	@ Denver	W 101–98	Al Jefferson (35)	Al Jefferson (11)	Ramon Sessions (7)	Pepsi Center; 16,151	20–27
48	January 31	@ L.A. Lakers	W 110–100	Al Jefferson (40)	Al Jefferson (18)	Ramon Sessions (13)	Staples Center; 18,997	21–27

February : 6–4 (home: 4–1; road: 2–3)

Game	Date	Team	Score	High points	High rebounds	High assists	Location Attendance	Record
49	February 1	@ Phoenix	L 95–105	Anthony Tolliver (14)	Al Jefferson (6)	Jannero Pargo (6)	US Airways Center; 16,248	21–28
50	February 4	@ Golden State	W 91–75	Al Jefferson (30)	Al Jefferson (13)	Kemba Walker (7)	Oracle Arena; 19,596	22–28
51	February 8	San Antonio	L 100–104	Al Jefferson (26)	Michael Kidd-Gilchrist (12)	Kemba Walker (8)	Time Warner Cable Arena; 19,084	22–29
52	February 11	Dallas	W 114–89	Al Jefferson (30)	Kemba Walker (9)	Josh McRoberts (13)	Time Warner Cable Arena; 11,467	23–29
53	February 12	@ Brooklyn	L 89–105	Kemba Walker (16)	Al Jefferson (10)	Josh McRoberts (3)	Barclays Center; 16,862	23–30
All-Star Break
54	February 18	@ Detroit	W 108–96	Al Jefferson (32)	Al Jefferson (12)	Jefferson & Henderson (7)	Palace of Auburn Hills; 11,285	24–30
55	February 19	Detroit	W 116–98	Al Jefferson (29)	Jefferson, Henderson & Biyombo (8)	Kemba Walker (16)	Time Warner Cable Arena; 14,400	25–30
56	February 21	New Orleans	W 90–87	Al Jefferson (33)	Al Jefferson (10)	Kemba Walker (8)	Time Warner Cable Arena; 15,867	26–30
57	February 22	Memphis	W 92–89	Kemba Walker (31)	Al Jefferson (9)	Kemba Walker (5)	Time Warner Cable Arena; 18,317	27–30
58	February 28	@ San Antonio	L 82–92	Al Jefferson (20)	Kidd-Gilchrist & Zeller(8)	Josh McRoberts (10)	AT&T Center; 18,581	27–31

March : 9–7 (home: 7–2; road: 2–5)

Game	Date	Team	Score	High points	High rebounds	High assists	Location Attendance	Record
59	March 2	@ Oklahoma City	L 99–116	Al Jefferson (25)	Al Jefferson (7)	Josh McRoberts (6)	Chesapeake Energy Arena; 18,203	27–32
60	March 3	@ Miami	L 107–124	Al Jefferson (38)	Al Jefferson (19)	Kemba Walker (8)	American Airlines Arena; 19,727	27–33
61	March 5	Indiana	W 109–87	Al Jefferson (34)	Al Jefferson (8)	Kemba Walker (9)	Time Warner Cable Arena; 15,372	28–33
62	March 7	Cleveland	W 101–92	Al Jefferson (28)	Chris Douglas-Roberts (9)	Kemba Walker (14)	Time Warner Cable Arena; 15,688	29–33
63	March 8	@ Memphis	L 89–111	Al Jefferson (17)	Cody Zeller (9)	Kemba Walker (5)	FedExForum; 17,298	29–34
64	March 10	Denver	W 105–98	Al Jefferson (26)	Al Jefferson (13)	Kemba Walker (7)	Time Warner Cable Arena; 14,312	30–34
65	March 12	@ Washington	W 98–85	Al Jefferson (26)	Michael Kidd-Gilchrist (12)	Kemba Walker (5)	Verizon Center; 17,220	31–34
66	March 14	Minnesota	W 105–93	Al Jefferson (25)	Al Jefferson (16)	Kemba Walker (7)	Time Warner Cable Arena; 16,983	32–34
67	March 16	@ Milwaukee	W 101–92	Kemba Walker (21)	Al Jefferson (7)	Kemba Walker (8)	BMO Harris Bradley Center; 14,536	33–34
68	March 17	Atlanta	L 83–97	Kemba Walker (20)	Al Jefferson (12)	Kemba Walker (7)	Time Warner Cable Arena; 14,419	33–35
69	March 19	@ Brooklyn	L 99–104	Al Jefferson (18)	Al Jefferson (12)	Kemba Walker (7)	Barclays Center; 17,222	33–36
70	March 22	Portland	W 124–94	Al Jefferson (28)	Gerald Henderson (8)	Jefferson & Walker (6)	Time Warner Cable Arena; 18,706	34–36
71	March 24	Houston	L 89–100	Kemba Walker (22)	Al Jefferson (11)	Josh McRoberts (4)	Time Warner Cable Arena; 15,511	34–37
72	March 26	Brooklyn	W 116–111	Al Jefferson (35)	Al Jefferson (15)	Kemba Walker (12)	Time Warner Cable Arena; 15,943	35–37
73	March 28	@ Orlando	L 105–110 (OT)	McRoberts & Walker (24)	Al Jefferson (8)	Kemba Walker (8)	Amway Center; 16,003	35–38
74	March 31	Washington	W 100–94	Kemba Walker (21)	Al Jefferson (11)	Kemba Walker (10)	Time Warner Cable Arena; 14,894	36–38

April : 7–1 (home: 3–0; road: 4–1)

Game	Date	Team	Score	High points	High rebounds	High assists	Location Attendance	Record
75	April 2	@ Philadelphia	W 123–93	Al Jefferson (25)	Al Jefferson (10)	Walker, Tolliver & Pargo (5)	Wells Fargo Center; 12,136	37–38
76	April 4	Orlando	W 91–80	Al Jefferson (29)	Al Jefferson (16)	Kemba Walker (10)	Time Warner Cable Arena; 17,708	38–38
77	April 5	@ Cleveland	W 96–94 (OT)	Al Jefferson (24)	Al Jefferson (15)	Kemba Walker (7)	Quicken Loans Arena; 18,179	39–38
78	April 9	@ Washington	W 94–88 (OT)	Al Jefferson (20)	Al Jefferson (18)	Kemba Walker (12)	Verizon Center; 17,784	40–38
79	April 11	@ Boston	L 103–106	Al Jefferson (32)	Al Jefferson (10)	Josh McRoberts (10)	TD Garden; 18,624	40–39
80	April 12	Philadelphia	W 111–105	Al Jefferson (29)	Al Jefferson (12)	Luke Ridnour (8)	Time Warner Cable Arena; 17,140	41–39
81	April 14	@ Atlanta	W 95–93	Al Jefferson (27)	Al Jefferson (15)	Kemba Walker (7)	Philips Arena; 11,918	42–39
82	April 16	Chicago	W 91–86 (OT)	Kemba Walker (22)	Al Jefferson (18)	Kemba Walker (8)	Time Warner Cable Arena; 17,627	43–39

2013–14 season schedule

== Playoffs ==
=== Game log ===
2014 playoff game log
Total: 0–4 (home: 0–2; road: 0–2)
First round: 0–4 (home: 0–2; road: 0–2)

Game	Date	Team	Score	High points	High rebounds	High assists	Location Attendance	Series
1	April 20	@ Miami	L 88–99	Kemba Walker (20)	Al Jefferson (10)	Kemba Walker (6)	American Airlines Arena; 19,640	0–1
2	April 23	@ Miami	L 97–101	Michael Kidd-Gilchrist (22)	Al Jefferson (13)	Kemba Walker (8)	American Airlines Arena; 19,603	0–2
3	April 26	Miami	L 85–98	Al Jefferson (20)	Josh McRoberts (9)	Luke Ridnour (6)	Time Warner Cable Arena; 20,367	0–3
4	April 28	Miami	L 98–109	Kemba Walker (29)	Josh McRoberts (10)	Walker & McRoberts (5)	Time Warner Cable Arena; 20,292	0–4

2014 playoff schedule

== Player statistics ==
=== Regular season ===
Player	POS	GP	GS	MP	REB	AST	STL	BLK	PTS	MPG	RPG	APG	SPG	BPG	PPG
Cody Zeller	C	82	3	1,416	353	92	40	41	490	17.3	4.3	1.1	.5	.5	6.0
Josh McRoberts	PF	78	78	2,360	373	333	58	46	661	30.3	4.8	4.3	.7	.6	8.5
Gerald Henderson Jr.	SG	77	77	2,461	310	199	51	32	1,081	32.0	4.0	2.6	.7	.4	14.0
Bismack Biyombo	C	77	9	1,072	366	8	7	86	222	13.9	4.8	.1	.1	1.1	2.9
Kemba Walker	PG	73	73	2,614	306	447	86	32	1,289	35.8	4.2	6.1	1.2	.4	17.7
Al Jefferson	C	73	73	2,553	792	155	67	79	1,594	35.0	10.8	2.1	.9	1.1	21.8
Anthony Tolliver	PF	64	9	1,298	168	42	19	15	393	20.3	2.6	.7	.3	.2	6.1
Michael Kidd-Gilchrist	SF	62	62	1,502	324	52	43	39	448	24.2	5.2	.8	.7	.6	7.2
Ramon Sessions^{†}	PG	55	7	1,305	117	206	33	6	578	23.7	2.1	3.7	.6	.1	10.5
Chris Douglas-Roberts	SF	49	8	1,016	119	51	29	16	339	20.7	2.4	1.0	.6	.3	6.9
Jannero Pargo	PG	29	0	242	20	52	14	1	136	8.3	.7	1.8	.5	.0	4.7
Jeffery Taylor	SF	26	8	629	60	22	13	5	208	24.2	2.3	.8	.5	.2	8.0
Luke Ridnour^{†}	PG	25	2	378	35	54	9	6	100	15.1	1.4	2.2	.4	.2	4.0
Jeff Adrien^{†}	PF	25	0	256	88	7	7	15	57	10.2	3.5	.3	.3	.6	2.3
Gary Neal^{†}	SG	22	1	507	40	37	11	0	247	23.0	1.8	1.7	.5	.0	11.2
Ben Gordon	SG	19	0	279	27	21	10	2	99	14.7	1.4	1.1	.5	.1	5.2
D. J. White	PF	2	0	10	2	0	1	0	0	5.0	1.0	.0	.5	.0	.0
Justin Hamilton^{†}	C	1	0	4	0	0	1	0	0	4.0	.0	.0	1.0	.0	.0
James Southerland^{†}	SF	1	0	3	0	0	0	0	0	3.0	.0	.0	.0	.0	.0

- ^{†} Denotes player spent time with another team in the season. Stats reflect time with the Bobcats only.

=== Playoffs ===
Player	POS	GP	GS	MP	REB	AST	STL	BLK	PTS	MPG	RPG	APG	SPG	BPG	PPG
Josh McRoberts	PF	4	4	154	27	15	4	1	46	38.5	6.8	3.8	1.0	.3	11.5
Kemba Walker	PG	4	4	153	15	24	8	3	78	38.3	3.8	6.0	2.0	.8	19.5
Gerald Henderson Jr.	SG	4	4	119	16	9	4	1	39	29.8	4.0	2.3	1.0	.3	9.8
Michael Kidd-Gilchrist	SF	4	4	91	26	6	0	2	34	22.8	6.5	1.5	.0	.5	8.5
Gary Neal	SG	4	0	104	8	4	0	0	45	26.0	2.0	1.0	.0	.0	11.3
Chris Douglas-Roberts	SF	4	0	70	8	2	0	0	38	17.5	2.0	.5	.0	.0	9.5
Cody Zeller	C	4	0	53	9	2	0	3	8	13.3	2.3	.5	.0	.8	2.0
Luke Ridnour	PG	4	0	36	4	12	0	1	10	9.0	1.0	3.0	.0	.3	2.5
Anthony Tolliver	PF	4	0	21	4	1	0	0	6	5.3	1.0	.3	.0	.0	1.5
Al Jefferson	C	3	3	106	28	2	1	5	56	35.3	9.3	.7	.3	1.7	18.7
Bismack Biyombo	C	3	1	48	11	1	0	2	8	16.0	3.7	.3	.0	.7	2.7
Jannero Pargo	PG	1	0	3	1	1	0	0	0	3.0	1.0	1.0	.0	.0	.0
D. J. White	PF	1	0	3	2	0	0	0	0	3.0	2.0	.0	.0	.0	.0

== Transactions ==
=== Overview ===
Players Added

Via draft

- Cody Zeller

Via free agency

- Al Jefferson
Players Lost

Via free agency

- Reggie Williams
- Byron Mullens
- DeSagana Diop
- Jannero Pargo

Waived

- Tyrus Thomas

=== Free agents ===
Additions
Player	Date signed	Former team
Al Jefferson	July 10	Utah Jazz

Subtractions
Player	Reason left	New team
Reggie Williams	Free agency	Houston Rockets
Byron Mullens	Free agency	Los Angeles Clippers
DeSagana Diop	Free agency	Cleveland Cavaliers
Jannero Pargo	Free agency	Re-signed
Tyrus Thomas	Waived	
