= Gerald Henderson Jr. =

American basketball player (born 1987)

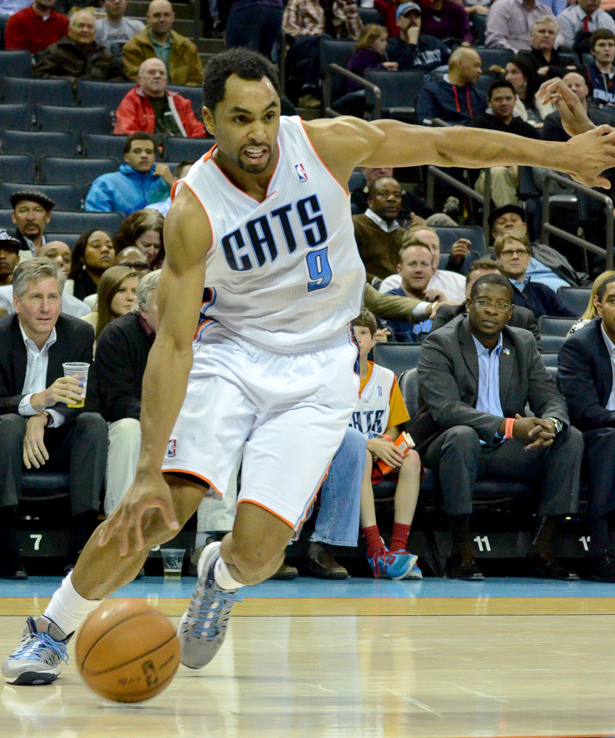
- Henderson with the Bobcats in March 2013

Personal information
- Born: December 9, 1987 (age 38) Caldwell, New Jersey, U.S.
- Listed height: 6 ft 5 in (1.96 m)
- Listed weight: 215 lb (98 kg)

Career information
- High school: Episcopal Academy (Merion, Pennsylvania)
- College: Duke (2006–2009)
- NBA draft: 2009: 1st round, 12th overall pick
- Drafted by: Charlotte Bobcats
- Playing career: 2009–2017
- Position: Shooting guard
- Number: 15, 9, 12

Career history
- 2009–2015: Charlotte Bobcats / Hornets
- 2015–2016: Portland Trail Blazers
- 2016–2017: Philadelphia 76ers

Career highlights
- Third-team All-American – AP, NABC (2009); First-team All-ACC (2009); Second-team Parade All-American (2006); McDonald's All-American (2006)
- Stats at NBA.com
- Stats at Basketball Reference

Jerome McKinley "Gerald" Henderson Jr. (born December 9, 1987) is an American former professional basketball player who played eight seasons in the National Basketball Association (NBA). He played college basketball for the Duke Blue Devils. Henderson was drafted with the 12th overall pick in the 2009 NBA draft by the Charlotte Bobcats. He is the son of former NBA player Gerald Henderson.

== High school career ==
Henderson attended high school at Episcopal Academy in Merion, Pennsylvania, where he teamed up with future UNC basketball player Wayne Ellington. He also lettered and earned all-conference honors in golf as a freshman and scratch golfer, and was two-time league champion in the high jump and triple jump in track and field. Henderson was ranked as the 18th-best high school senior by The Recruiting Services Consensus Index.

== College career ==
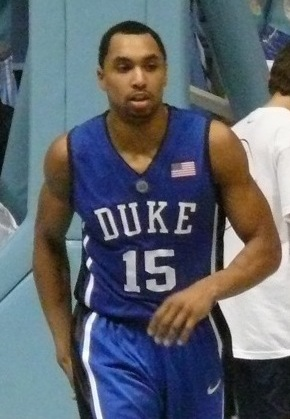
Henderson with Duke in 2009

After seeing limited playing time off the bench during his freshman year, Henderson moved into the starting lineup as a sophomore and averaged 12.7 points per game. During his junior year, Henderson led the team in scoring 16.5 points per game on the way to a First-Team All-ACC award and ACC tournament championship. Duke earned a 2nd seed in the NCAA tournament.

== Professional career ==
=== Charlotte Bobcats / Hornets (2009–2015) ===
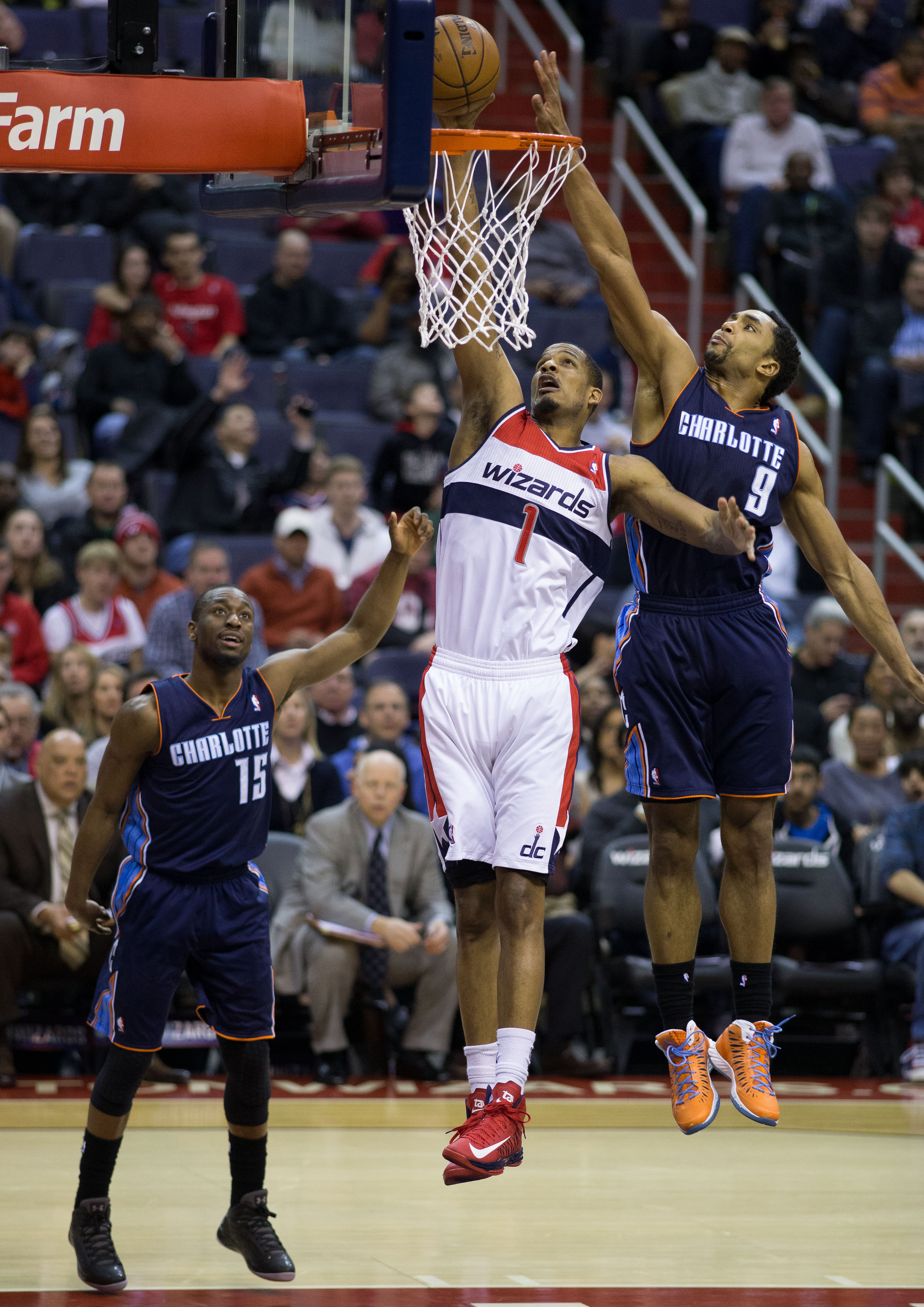
Henderson (No. 9) attempting to block Trevor Ariza's layup in March 2013

Henderson decided to forgo his senior season and enter the 2009 NBA draft where he was drafted 12th overall by the Charlotte Bobcats. On July 8, 2009, Henderson signed a multi-year deal with the Bobcats.

On October 29, 2010, Bobcats picked up the third-year option on Henderson's contract.

The 2011–12 season would be something of a breakout year for Henderson with the Bobcats. Despite finishing with the worst record in the history of the NBA, Henderson proved to be an effective scorer and was one of the lone bright spots on the team. Henderson saw career numbers in minutes per game (33.3), field goal percentage (45.9%), rebounds per game (4.1), assists per game (2.3), and points per game (15.1). He would prove to be the main offensive weapon for the Bobcats, particularly late in the season.

On March 12, 2013, Henderson had a career high in points scored in a win over the Boston Celtics when he scored 35 points. He matched that total against the New York Knicks seventeen days later.

On June 28, 2013, the Bobcats extended a qualifying offer to Henderson, thus making him a restricted free agent. On July 30, 2013, the team officially re-signed Henderson.

On January 8, 2015, Henderson scored a season-high 31 points to help the Hornets win the fourth straight game with a 103–95 victory over the Toronto Raptors.

On June 17, 2015, Henderson exercised his player option with the Hornets for the 2015–16 season.

=== Portland Trail Blazers (2015–2016) ===
On June 24, 2015, Henderson was traded, along with Noah Vonleh, to the Portland Trail Blazers in exchange for Nicolas Batum. On December 15, Henderson scored 19-points, including a career-high-tying 4 three-point shots, in a 105–101 win over the New Orleans Pelicans.

=== Philadelphia 76ers (2016–2017) ===
On July 9, 2016, Henderson signed with the Philadelphia 76ers. On June 30, 2017, he was waived by the 76ers.

=== Injuries and retirement ===
On August 2, 2017, Henderson opted to undergo an operation on his troublesome hip and missed the entire 2017–18 NBA season to fully recover. During the 2018 off-season, Henderson attempted to make a comeback to the NBA after undergoing a third surgical procedure on his hip. He worked out for teams in September 2018, but tore his Achilles tendon during a pickup game in Golden State. In January 2019, he joined the Charlotte Hornets' broadcast team at Fox Sports Southeast for the second half of the 2018–19 season. On April 30, 2019, he officially retired from the NBA.

== NBA career statistics ==
Legend
GP	Games played	GS	Games started	MPG	Minutes per game
FG%	Field goal percentage	3P%	3-point field goal percentage	FT%	Free throw percentage
RPG	Rebounds per game	APG	Assists per game	SPG	Steals per game
BPG	Blocks per game	PPG	Points per game	**Bold**	Career high

=== Regular season ===
Year	Team	GP	GS	MPG	FG%	3P%	FT%	RPG	APG	SPG	BPG	PPG
2009–10	Charlotte	43	0	8.3	.356	.157	.745	1.3	.3	.2	.2	2.6
2010–11	Charlotte	68	30	24.4	.454	.194	.785	3.0	1.5	.7	**.5**	9.6
2011–12	Charlotte	55	55	**33.3**	**.459**	.234	.760	**4.1**	2.3	.9	.4	15.1
2012–13	Charlotte	68	58	31.4	.447	.330	.824	3.7	**2.6**	**1.0**	**.5**	**15.5**
2013–14	Charlotte	77	**77**	32.0	.433	.348	.761	4.0	**2.6**	.7	.4	14.0
2014–15	Charlotte	**80**	72	28.9	.437	.331	**.848**	3.4	**2.6**	.6	.3	12.1
2015–16	Portland	72	0	19.9	.439	**.353**	.767	2.9	1.0	.5	.3	8.7
2016–17	Philadelphia	72	41	23.2	.423	**.353**	.806	2.6	1.6	.6	.2	9.2
Career		535	333	25.9	.440	.327	.793	3.2	1.9	.7	.3	11.2

=== Playoffs ===
Year	Team	GP	GS	MPG	FG%	3P%	FT%	RPG	APG	SPG	BPG	PPG
2014	Charlotte	4	**4**	**29.8**	**.378**	.000	.647	**4.0**	**2.3**	**1.0**	**.3**	**9.8**
2016	Portland	**11**	0	21.3	.366	**.368**	**.750**	3.2	1.5	.5	**.3**	6.9
Career		15	4	23.5	.370	.250	.690	3.4	1.7	.7	.3	7.7

== See also ==
- 2009 NCAA Men's Basketball All-Americans
- 2006 high school boys basketball All-Americans
- List of second-generation National Basketball Association players
