= Al Jefferson =

American basketball player (born 1985)

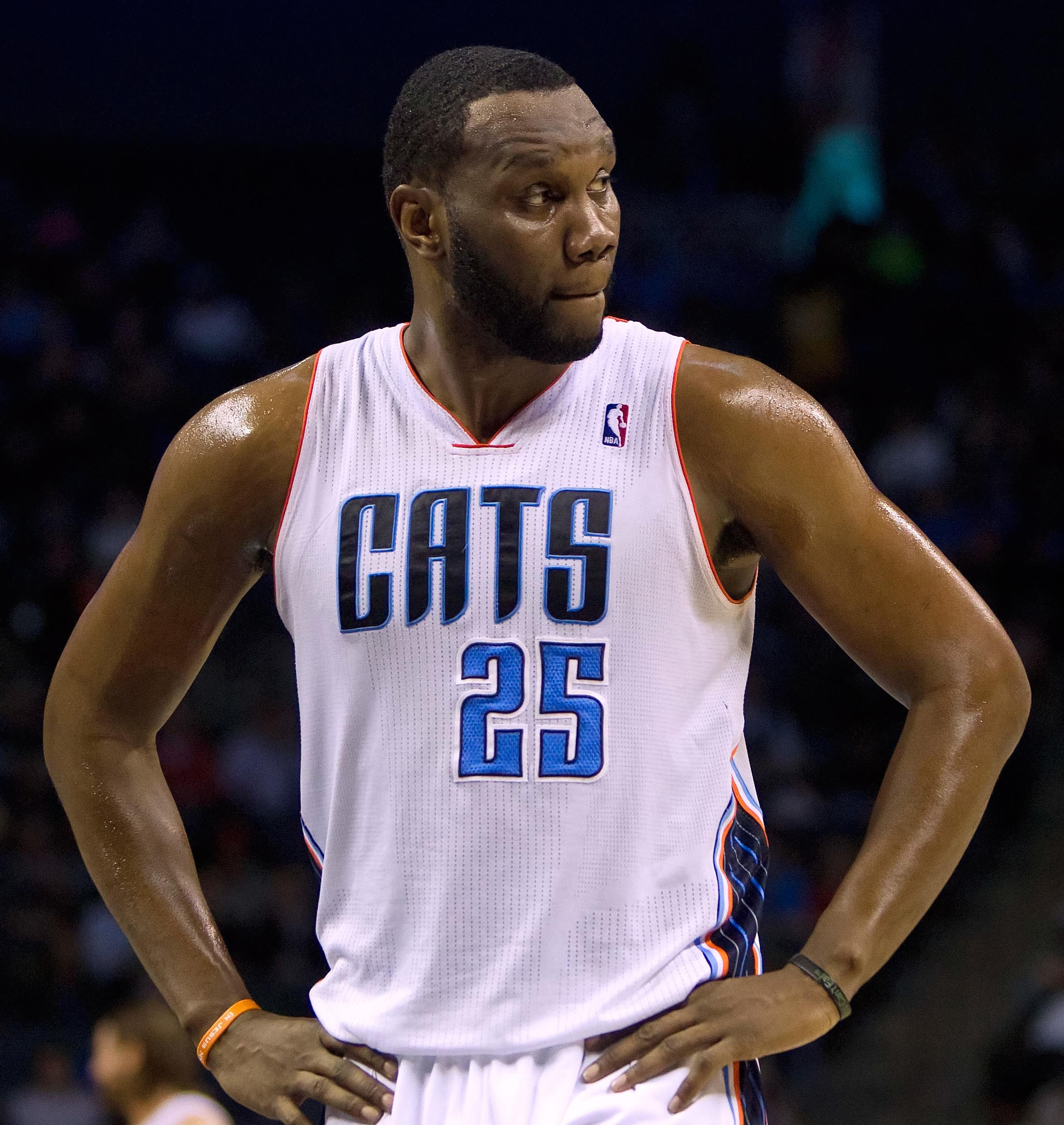
- Jefferson with the Charlotte Bobcats in 2014

Personal information
- Born: January 4, 1985 (age 41) Monticello, Mississippi, U.S.
- Listed height: 6 ft 10 in (2.08 m)
- Listed weight: 280 lb (127 kg)

Career information
- High school: Prentiss (Prentiss, Mississippi)
- NBA draft: 2004: 1st round, 15th overall pick
- Drafted by: Boston Celtics
- Playing career: 2004–2018
- Position: Center / power forward
- Number: 8, 7, 25

Career history
- 2004–2007: Boston Celtics
- 2007–2010: Minnesota Timberwolves
- 2010–2013: Utah Jazz
- 2013–2016: Charlotte Bobcats / Hornets
- 2016–2018: Indiana Pacers
- 2018: Xinjiang Flying Tigers

Career highlights
- All-NBA Third Team (2014); NBA All-Rookie Second Team (2005); McDonald's All-American (2004); First-team Parade All-American (2004); Mississippi Mr. Basketball (2004)

Career NBA statistics
- Points: 14,343 (15.7 ppg)
- Rebounds: 7,690 (8.4 rpg)
- Blocks: 1,093 (1.5 bpg)
- Stats at NBA.com
- Stats at Basketball Reference

Al Ricardo Jefferson (born January 4, 1985) is an American former professional basketball player. A center/power forward, he was a high school All-American for Prentiss High School in Mississippi before skipping college to enter the 2004 NBA draft, where he was drafted 15th overall by the Boston Celtics. He played 14 seasons in the National Basketball Association (NBA) for the Celtics, Minnesota Timberwolves, Utah Jazz, Charlotte Hornets and Indiana Pacers, earning third-team All-NBA honors in 2014 with the Hornets.

== High school career ==
Born in Monticello, Mississippi, Jefferson attended Prentiss High School in the small nearby town of Prentiss from 2000 to 2004. After starting for his varsity team as a freshman at Prentiss, he became one of the elite players in the country as a junior, drawing the attention of both college coaches around the country, and the scouts of the NBA. In his senior year for the Bulldogs, he averaged an astounding 42.6 points, 18 rebounds and seven blocks per game as his Bulldogs team went on to lose in the Mississippi state class 3A semi-finals to Byhalia High School 88–73, in which Jefferson finished with 56 points.

Considered a five-star recruit by Rivals.com, Jefferson was listed as the No. 1 center and the No. 4 player in the nation in 2004. He had originally committed to Arkansas, but opted instead to make the jump to the NBA straight out of high school.

== Professional career ==
=== Boston Celtics (2004–2007) ===
Jefferson was drafted with the 15th overall pick by the Boston Celtics in the 2004 NBA draft, becoming the first high school player to be drafted by the Celtics (Kendrick Perkins was drafted by the Grizzlies, then traded to Boston on draft day in the 2003 NBA draft). He played primarily as a power forward and averaged 6.7 points and 4.4 rebounds in 14.8 minutes per game during his rookie season. Jefferson initially wore #8 for the Celtics, but shortly after the team reacquired Antoine Walker midway through the season, he left the #8 for Walker and switched to #7 as homage to his idol, Indiana Pacers all-star Jermaine O'Neal.

Jefferson's 2005–06 season was widely considered a disappointment, mostly due to a series of ankle injuries and a torn meniscus in his right knee which limited him to playing in 59 games. He averaged 7.9 points and 5.1 rebounds in 18.0 minutes per game during his sophomore season.

In the off-season prior to the 2006–07 season, Jefferson hired a personal chef and lost about 30 pounds. After experiencing lingering pain after participating in the Las Vegas Summer League, a CAT scan revealed bone spurs. On August 2, 2006, he underwent ankle surgery to remove the bone spurs. On November 8, 2006, prior to the fourth game of the season, Jefferson had appendectomy surgery at New England Baptist Hospital and subsequently missed seven games as he returned to the lineup on November 22, 2006.

While already playing increased minutes (9.3 points and 7.0 rebounds in 22.0 minutes per game over nine games as a reserve), Jefferson's role expanded due to an injury to starting center Kendrick Perkins. With backup centers Michael Olowokandi and Theo Ratliff already on the injured list, Celtics' coach Doc Rivers started Jefferson at center on December 6, 2006, against the Memphis Grizzlies. Over the next seven games, Jefferson averaged 16.3 points and 11.1 rebounds in 33.7 minutes per game. In what some considered a breakout performance against the New Jersey Nets on December 9, 2006, he scored a career-high 29 points and grabbed 14 rebounds, which tied a career high (set on May 5, 2005, in a playoff game against the Indiana Pacers). It was the second time he had scored more than 20 points in a game. The previous occasion was on December 10, 2005, against the Dallas Mavericks where he scored 21 points. His third and fourth 20-point game came six and seven days after the second, on December 15 and 16, when he scored 28 against the Denver Nuggets and 22 against the Charlotte Bobcats. These efforts punctuated a five-game win streak by the Boston Celtics.

On March 3, 2007, Jefferson scored a career-high 32 points to go along with 18 rebounds against the New Jersey Nets, against whom he had previously set his career high in points against earlier in the season. On March 5, Jefferson was named the NBA's Eastern Conference Player of the Week for the week starting February 26 through March 4.

=== Minnesota Timberwolves (2007–2010) ===
On July 31, 2007, Jefferson was traded, along with Gerald Green, Ryan Gomes, Theo Ratliff, Sebastian Telfair and draft picks, to the Minnesota Timberwolves in exchange for Kevin Garnett. After landing in Minnesota, Jefferson quickly signed a large contract extension before the season. At $65 million over five years, Jefferson considered it satisfactory in spite of having fallen short of a max deal. He chose not to pursue one, due to "having not really proved" himself.

In his first season with the Timberwolves, Jefferson was the team's scoring leader. Playing in all 82 games, he ranked 20th in the NBA in points per game (11th in total points), averaging 21.0 points per game while shooting .500 from the field. Jefferson also defined himself as one of the premier big men in the NBA by being only one of four players to average 20 points and 10 rebounds (the others being Dwight Howard, Carlos Boozer and Antawn Jamison). Jefferson ranked 5th in the NBA in rebounding, averaging 11.1 (4th in total rebounds) and 2nd in offensive rebounds per game (3.8), only behind Tyson Chandler (4.1). Jefferson is ranked 12th in the NBA efficiency and is 3rd in the NBA in double-doubles.

In January 2008, Jefferson won Western Conference Player of the Week honors after averaging 33.3 points and 15.3 rebounds and leading the Timberwolves to a 3–1 record from January 21 to 27. On November 10, 2008, Jefferson’s first son, Tyeric Randolph, was born in Jackson, Mississippi.

Jefferson scored a career-high 40 points against the New Jersey Nets on January 27, 2008 and repeated such a performance against the Charlotte Bobcats on April 8, 2008.

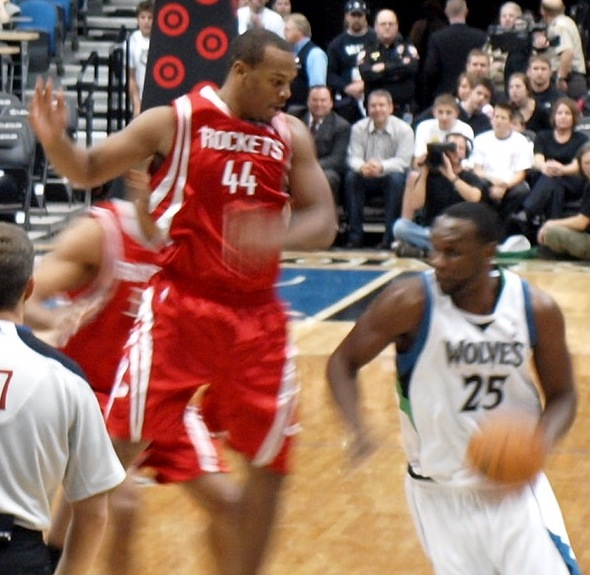
Jefferson driving against Chuck Hayes of the Houston Rockets

Jefferson was having a career best year, averaging 23.1 points, 11.0 rebounds and 1.7 blocks per game in the first 50 games of the season, until suffering a serious right knee injury after landing awkwardly on one leg in a game at New Orleans. Jefferson claimed that he felt a pop in his knee and the injury resulted in a complete tear to the ACL which required reconstructive surgery that ended his season. At the time the Wolves were 17–33 and showing signs of improvement, but with Jefferson out, they went 7–25 over their remaining games, and were a lottery team once again.

On January 13, 2010, Jefferson set a single-game franchise record with 26 rebounds in a triple overtime loss to the Houston Rockets. The record was later surpassed by Kevin Love in November 2010.

Coming off knee surgery, Jefferson had a solid season in 2009–10 as he played 76 games while averaging 17.1 points, 9.3 rebounds and a career-high 1.8 assists in 32.4 minutes per game.

=== Utah Jazz (2010–2013) ===
On July 13, 2010, Jefferson was traded to the Utah Jazz for two future first-round picks and center Kosta Koufos. It gave him the chance to play alongside All-Star point guard Deron Williams. His first season in Utah brought numerous ups and downs, including the in-season departures of Williams and coach Jerry Sloan. Jefferson saw the need for a new leader and stepped up to become part of the foundation for a young team to build on.

In what was an injury-riddled season for the Jazz, Jefferson started in all 82 games during the regular season and regained some of his explosiveness in 2011, showing he was fully recovered from the devastating knee injury he suffered in 2009. His return to form contributed 37 double-doubles during the season and 794 total rebounds – the second highest total of his career. He finished the 2010–11 season with averages of 18.6 points and 9.7 rebounds per game.

In the lockout shortened 2011–12 season, Jefferson furthered his improvement, transitioning into his role as team leader while continuing to put up impressive numbers. He showed energy and tenacity as well as an improved defensive game, and heading into the All-Star break, many were calling for him to be selected to his first All-Star team, including Brian T. Smith of The Salt Lake Tribune who noted, "If the Jazz keep winning during January and Jefferson keeps producing, the eight-year veteran could finally be in the running for an All-Star spot."

Despite not receiving an All-Star selection, Jefferson ended the season tied for seventh in the league with 31 double doubles and led his team back to the playoffs. Behind Jefferson's strong season, the young Jazz finished 36–30 and secured the eighth seed in the West where they faced the San Antonio Spurs in the first round. While Jefferson did his best to contain Spurs' superstar Tim Duncan, Utah simply couldn't measure up against San Antonio. The Spurs swept the Jazz in four games and would eventually go on to reach the conference finals.

Throughout the 2012–13 season, Jefferson was the driving force for the Jazz, leading the team again in scoring and rebounding and finishing in the top ten in the league in double doubles yet again with 37 compiled throughout the course of the season. He posted a career-high 40 points late in the season against the Minnesota Timberwolves and was poised to be the catalyst for the Jazz to make a return trip to the playoffs. Unfortunately, the Jazz narrowly missed out on returning to the playoffs, falling just two games shy of the No. 8 seed with a 43–39 record. Despite the season ending early, Jefferson again established himself as a force down low and figured to be one of the most valued free agents heading into the offseason.

=== Charlotte Bobcats / Hornets (2013–2016) ===
==== 2013–14 season ====
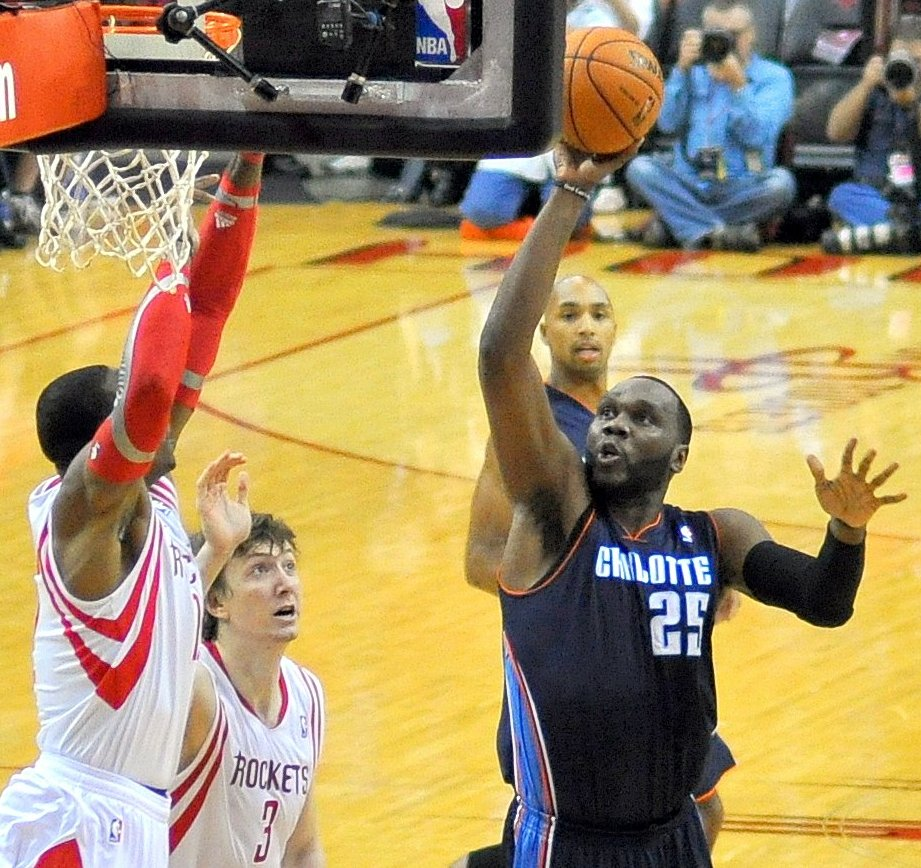
Jefferson takes a shot during his debut game for the Charlotte Bobcats on October 30, 2013

On July 10, 2013, Jefferson signed a three-year, $40.5 million contract with the Charlotte Bobcats. However, despite the big contract with a new team, Jefferson's arrival was delayed by a right ankle sprain that caused him to miss the entire preseason and nine of the team's first 12 games. Though he was slowed by the ankle injury, upon his return, Jefferson showed glimpses of promise while working himself back into rhythm as by the time January rolled around, he was finally healthy and ready to dominate. On January 31, 2014, Jefferson tied a career high with 40 points in a win against the Los Angeles Lakers. He continued his high level of play en route to winning the Eastern Conference Player of the Month for his performance in March 2014. He averaged 24.7 points and 10.6 rebounds while shooting 55% from the floor during the month of March, and went on to win the Eastern Conference Player of the Month for April 2014 as well.

On April 20, 2014, Jefferson suffered a plantar fasciitis injury during Game 1 of the Bobcats' first round playoff series against the Miami Heat and later missed Game 4 because of the injury. On June 4, 2014, Jefferson was named to the 2014 All-NBA third team.

==== 2014–15 season ====
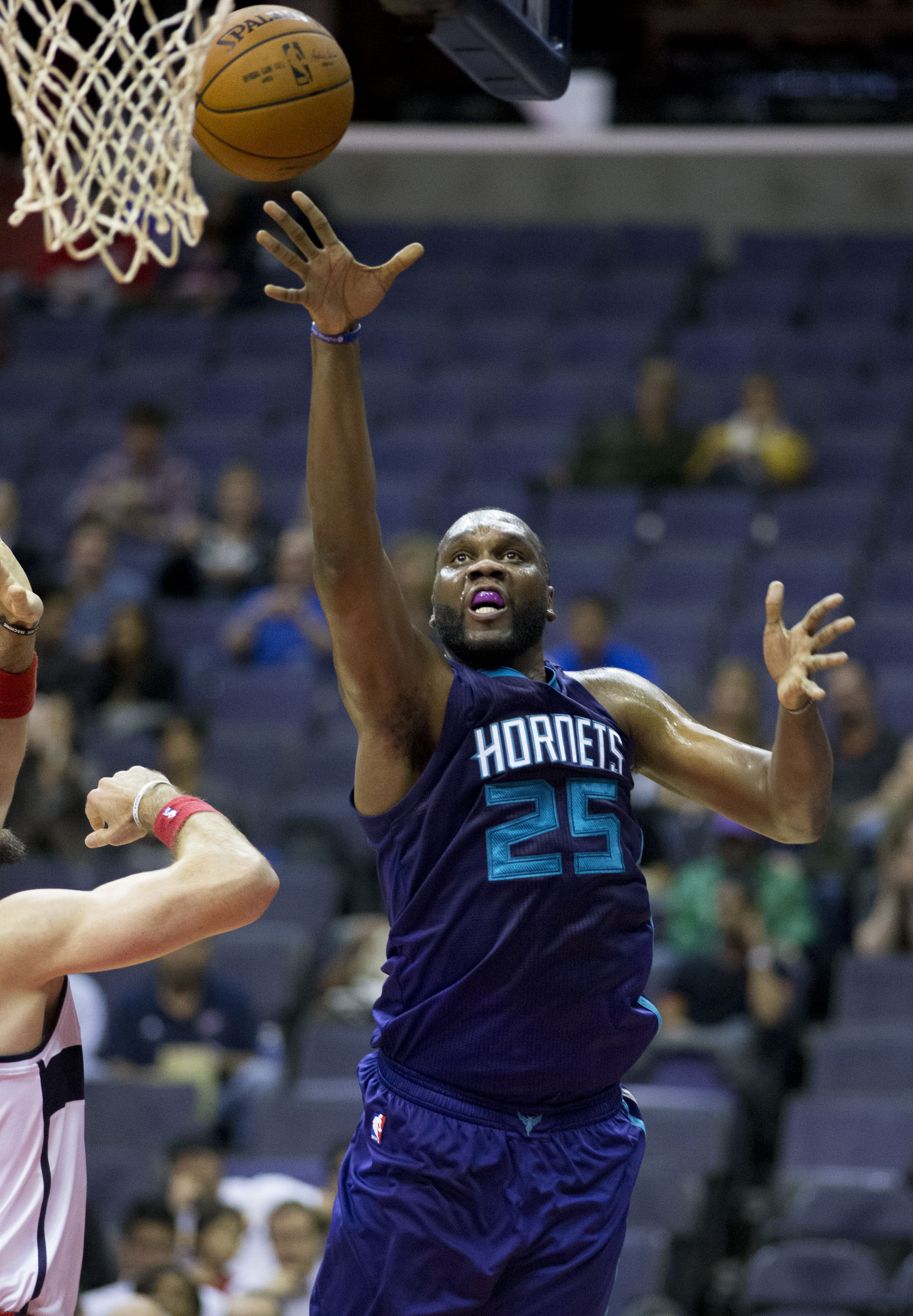
Jefferson with the Charlotte Hornets in 2014

After kicking back into form in 2013–14 with his best averages since 2008–09, Jefferson continued to thrive with the young, newly named Charlotte Hornets in 2014–15. On November 7, 2014, Jefferson scored a season-high 34 points in the Hornets' 122–119 double overtime win over the Atlanta Hawks to move to a record of 3–3. Despite the great win and a promising start to the season, the Hornets went on to lose the next 12 out of 13 games, with a 10-game losing streak expanding from November 15 to December 3. The team finally broke the streak on December 5 against the New York Knicks, as Jefferson recorded 16 points and 13 rebounds in the 103–102 win.

During the fourth quarter of the Hornets' 104–86 win over the Utah Jazz on December 20, Jefferson had nearly registered his third straight game with at least 20 points and 10 rebounds but left the game with six minutes remaining with a mild groin strain and did not return. In 27 minutes of action, he recorded 19 points and 10 rebounds. Despite the injury scare, Jefferson played the following game against the Denver Nuggets on December 22, recording 22 points and 7 rebounds to help the Hornets win their third straight game. His recurring groin injury flared up again on December 29 against the Milwaukee Bucks as he left the game during the fourth quarter and did not return after managing just 6 points and 8 rebounds. The Hornets went on to lose the game in overtime. He was subsequently ruled out for four weeks the following day after he was diagnosed with a strained adductor muscle in his left groin. After missing nine games with the injury, Jefferson returned on January 19, recording 8 points and 5 rebounds in a Hornets win over the Minnesota Timberwolves. Coming off the bench, it marked the first time since December 4, 2006 – a span of 544 games – that Jefferson didn't start in a game in which he played. He came off the bench for a further three games before reclaiming his starting spot on January 28 against San Antonio and subsequently recorded 17 points and 16 rebounds in a loss to the Spurs.

On March 11, in a loss to the Sacramento Kings, Jefferson left the game late in the third quarter due to a strained right calf after managing 9 points and 6 rebounds in 24 minutes of action. He returned after sitting out one game to score 10 points in a blowout loss to the Utah Jazz. On March 22, he recorded his 20th double-double of the season with 18 points and a team-high 11 rebounds in a 109–98 win over the Minnesota Timberwolves.

On June 15, 2015, Jefferson exercised his player option with the Hornets for the 2015–16 season.

==== 2015–16 season ====
Jefferson averaged just 12.8 points and 7.3 rebounds over the Hornets' first four games of the 2015–16 season, with the team winning just one of those four games. He found his rhythm on November 5 against the Dallas Mavericks, recording 31 points and 9 rebounds to help lead the Hornets to a 108–94 win. On November 20, he recorded his third double-double of the season with 26 points, 10 rebounds and a season-high 5 blocks in a 113–88 win over the Philadelphia 76ers. On November 29, he exited the Hornets' game against the Milwaukee Bucks with a left calf strain with 5:09 remaining in the first quarter, and did not return.

On December 9, 2015, Jefferson was suspended without pay for five games for violating the terms of the NBA/NBPA Anti-Drug Program. He missed 11 games between December 2 and 23 due to injury and suspension, returning to action on December 26 against the Memphis Grizzlies, coming off the bench for the first time since January 24, 2015. He finished with two points on 1-of-8 shooting and four rebounds in 17 minutes, and fouled out with 8:10 remaining in the fourth quarter. He managed just two games following his suspension before a tear in the lateral meniscus of his right knee was discovered on December 30. The injury subsequently ruled him out for six weeks. Jefferson returned to action on February 19 after missing 22 games. He scored six points and grabbed five rebounds in 23 minutes off the bench in a 98–95 win over the Milwaukee Bucks. In the team's regular season finale on April 13, Jefferson scored 26 points off the bench in a 117–103 win over the Orlando Magic, helping the Hornets finish as the sixth seed in the Eastern Conference with a 48–34 record.

In Game 2 of the Hornets' first round playoff series match-up with the Miami Heat, Jefferson scored 16 second-quarter points to finish with 25 on 12-of-17 shooting off the bench in a 115–103 loss. The Hornets went on to lose the series in seven games.

=== Indiana Pacers (2016–2018) ===
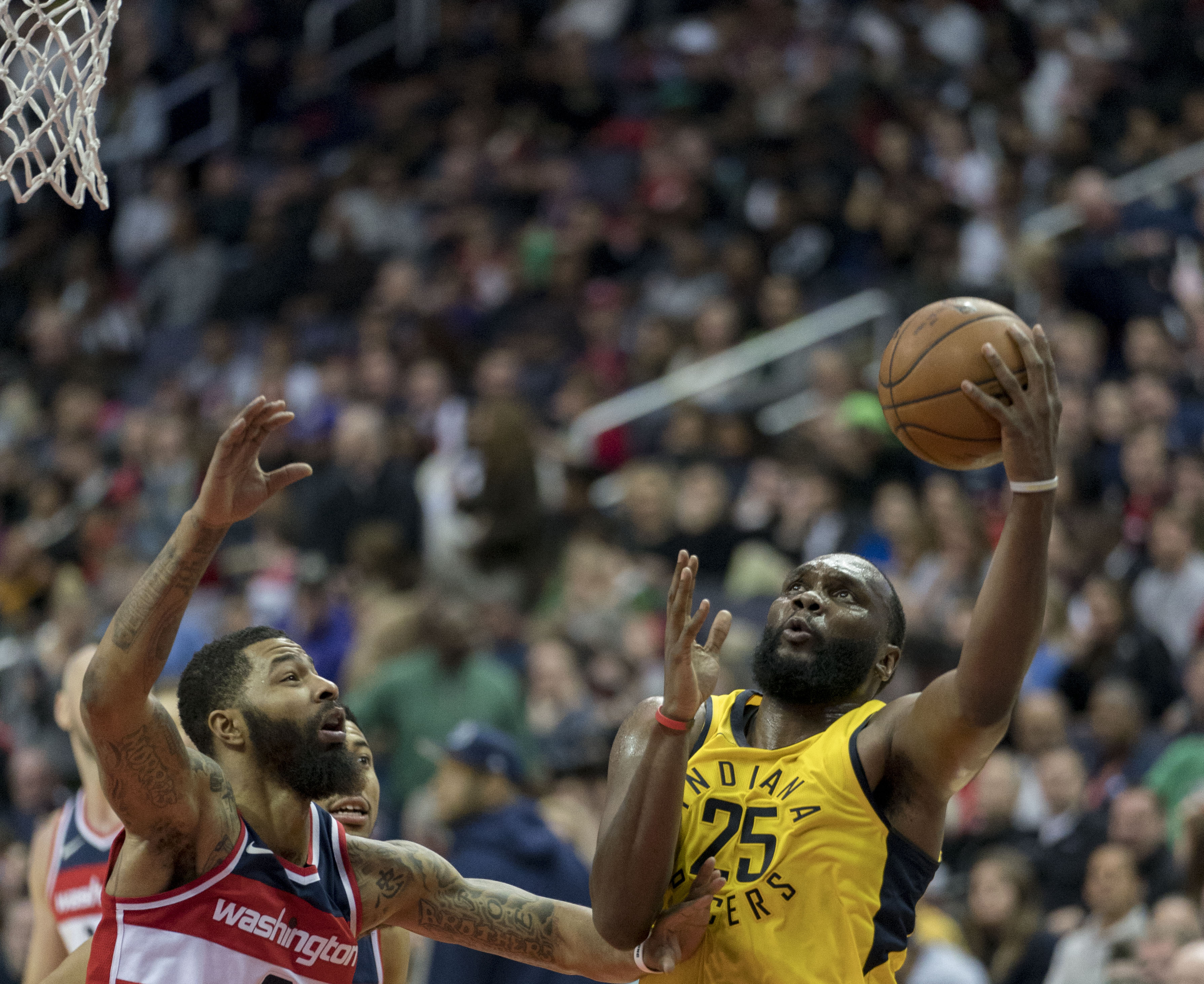
Jefferson with the Indiana Pacers in 2018

On July 9, 2016, Jefferson signed a three-year, $30 million contract with the Indiana Pacers. He made his debut for the Pacers in their season opener on October 26, 2016, recording seven points and six rebounds off the bench in a 130–121 overtime win over the Dallas Mavericks. After averaging just 5.7 points per game over the first seven games of the 2016–17 season, Jefferson scored a season-high 18 points on November 9 against the Philadelphia 76ers. On January 18, 2017, he set a new season high with 20 points against the Sacramento Kings. Two days later against the Los Angeles Lakers, Jefferson had his second straight 20-point game. Jefferson missed the final eight games of the regular season with a sprained left ankle.

On November 8, 2017, Jefferson had a 19-point effort against the Detroit Pistons. On March 15, 2018, he scored a season-high 20 points to go with a season-high 12 rebounds in a 106–99 loss to the Toronto Raptors. On April 10, in what was his final NBA game, Jefferson recorded 12 points and five rebounds against the Charlotte Hornets.

On July 2, 2018, Jefferson was waived by the Pacers.

=== Xinjiang Flying Tigers (2018) ===
In July 2018, Jefferson signed with the Xinjiang Flying Tigers of the Chinese Basketball Association. He left the team in November 2018. In 10 games, he averaged 15.1 points, 7.5 rebounds and 1.1 assists per game.

== Retirement and Big3 ==
On March 23, 2019, Jefferson announced his retirement from the NBA. Earlier that month, he signed to play in the BIG3.

== NBA career statistics ==
Legend
GP	Games played	GS	Games started	MPG	Minutes per game
FG%	Field goal percentage	3P%	3-point field goal percentage	FT%	Free throw percentage
RPG	Rebounds per game	APG	Assists per game	SPG	Steals per game
BPG	Blocks per game	PPG	Points per game	**Bold**	Career high
*	Led the league

=== Regular season ===
Year	Team	GP	GS	MPG	FG%	3P%	FT%	RPG	APG	SPG	BPG	PPG
2004–05	Boston	71	1	14.8	.528	.000	.630	4.4	.3	.3	.8	6.7
2005–06	Boston	59	7	18.0	.499	.000	.642	5.1	.5	.5	.8	7.9
2006–07	Boston	69	60	33.6	.514	.000	.681	11.0	1.3	.7	1.5	16.0
2007–08	Minnesota	**82***	**82***	35.6	.500	.000	.721	**11.1**	1.4	.9	1.5	21.0
2008–09	Minnesota	50	50	**36.7**	.497	.000	.738	11.0	1.6	.8	1.7	**23.1**
2009–10	Minnesota	76	76	32.4	.498	.000	.680	9.3	1.8	.8	1.3	17.1
2010–11	Utah	**82**	**82***	35.9	.496	–	.761	9.7	1.8	.6	**1.9**	18.6
2011–12	Utah	61	61	34.0	.492	.250	.774	9.6	**2.2**	.8	1.7	19.2
2012–13	Utah	78	78	33.1	.494	.118	.770	9.2	2.1	**1.0**	1.1	17.8
2013–14	Charlotte	73	73	35.0	.509	.200	.690	10.8	2.1	.9	1.1	21.8
2014–15	Charlotte	65	61	30.6	.481	**.400**	.655	8.4	1.7	.7	1.3	16.6
2015–16	Charlotte	47	18	23.3	.485	–	.649	6.4	1.5	.6	.9	12.0
2016–17	Indiana	66	1	14.1	.499	.000	.765	4.2	.9	.3	.2	8.1
2017–18	Indiana	36	1	13.4	**.534**	.000	**.833**	4.0	.8	.4	.6	7.0
Career		915	651	28.7	.499	.121	.711	8.4	1.5	.7	1.2	15.7

=== Playoffs ===
Year	Team	GP	GS	MPG	FG%	3P%	FT%	RPG	APG	SPG	BPG	PPG
2005	Boston	**7**	0	19.4	.415	–	.750	6.4	.3	.6	1.1	6.1
2012	Utah	4	4	**35.3**	**.529**	.000	.250	8.5	**2.5**	**1.3**	.8	18.3
2014	Charlotte	3	3	**35.3**	.491	–	**.800**	**9.3**	.7	.3	**1.7**	**18.7**
2016	Charlotte	**7**	**5**	24.0	.506	–	.692	6.1	1.1	.6	.4	13.3
Career		21	12	26.2	.494	.000	.676	7.1	1.0	.7	.9	12.6
