= 2013–14 NBA season =

68th NBA season

- League: National Basketball Association
- Sport: Basketball
- Duration: October 29, 2013 – April 16, 2014; April 19, 2014 – May 31, 2014 (Playoffs); June 5 – 15, 2014 (Finals)
- Games: 82
- Teams: 30
- TV partner(s): ABC, TNT, ESPN, NBA TV

Draft
- Top draft pick: Anthony Bennett
- Picked by: Cleveland Cavaliers

Regular season
- Top seed: San Antonio Spurs
- Season MVP: Kevin Durant (Oklahoma City)
- Top scorer: Kevin Durant (Oklahoma City)

Playoffs
- Eastern champions: Miami Heat
- Eastern runners-up: Indiana Pacers
- Western champions: San Antonio Spurs
- Western runners-up: Oklahoma City Thunder

Finals
- Champions: San Antonio Spurs
- Runners-up: Miami Heat
- Finals MVP: Kawhi Leonard (San Antonio)

NBA seasons
- ← 2012–13 2014–15 →

The 2013–14 NBA season was the 68th season of the National Basketball Association (NBA). The regular season began on October 29, 2013, with the Indiana Pacers hosting a game against the Orlando Magic followed by the 2012–13 NBA champions Miami Heat hosting a game against the Chicago Bulls followed by the Los Angeles Lakers hosting a game against the Los Angeles Clippers. The 2014 NBA All-Star Game was played on February 16, 2014, at the Smoothie King Center in New Orleans. Cleveland's Kyrie Irving won the NBA All-Star Game Most Valuable Player Award. The regular season ended on April 16, 2014, and the playoffs began on April 19, 2014, and ended on June 15, 2014, with the San Antonio Spurs defeating the Miami Heat in five games to win the 2014 NBA Finals.

The season has notoriety attached for the fact that heralded big-market franchises Lakers, Knicks and Celtics all failed to make the playoffs for the first time in NBA history.

== Transactions ==
=== Free agency ===
Free agency negotiation started on July 1, 2013, with players being able to sign starting July 10, after the July moratorium ended.

=== Coaching changes ===
Coaching changes
Off-season
Team	2012–13 season	2013–14 season
Atlanta Hawks	Larry Drew	Mike Budenholzer
Boston Celtics	Doc Rivers	Brad Stevens
Brooklyn Nets	P. J. Carlesimo (interim)	Jason Kidd
Charlotte Bobcats	Mike Dunlap	Steve Clifford
Cleveland Cavaliers	Byron Scott	Mike Brown
Denver Nuggets	George Karl	Brian Shaw
Detroit Pistons	Lawrence Frank	Maurice Cheeks
Los Angeles Clippers	Vinny Del Negro	Doc Rivers
Memphis Grizzlies	Lionel Hollins	David Joerger
Milwaukee Bucks	Jim Boylan (interim)	Larry Drew
Philadelphia 76ers	Doug Collins	Brett Brown
Phoenix Suns	Lindsey Hunter (interim)	Jeff Hornacek
Sacramento Kings	Keith Smart	Michael Malone
In-season
Team	Outgoing coach	Incoming coach
Detroit Pistons	Maurice Cheeks	John Loyer (interim)

==== Off-season ====
- On April 18, 2013, Byron Scott was fired by the Cleveland Cavaliers after three years with the team.
- On April 18, 2013, Lawrence Frank was fired by the Detroit Pistons after two years with the team.
- On April 18, 2013, Doug Collins resigned from the Philadelphia 76ers after three years with the team.
- On April 22, 2013, the Phoenix Suns fired GM Lance Blanks after three years with the team.
- On April 23, 2013, Mike Dunlap was fired by the Charlotte Bobcats after one season with the team.
- On April 24, 2013, Mike Brown was rehired by the Cleveland Cavaliers as head coach.
- On May 1, 2013, the Milwaukee Bucks announced that interim head coach Jim Boylan was not offered the full-time job.
- On May 5, 2013, the Brooklyn Nets announced that interim head coach P. J. Carlesimo was not offered the full-time position.
- On May 7, 2013, the Phoenix Suns named former Boston Celtics assistant general manager Ryan McDonough as the new general manager.
- On May 21, 2013, the Los Angeles Clippers announced that Vinny Del Negro will not return as head coach after three years with the team.
- On May 21, 2013, the Toronto Raptors announced that GM Bryan Colangelo will not be returning as general manager after several seasons with the team.
- On May 28, 2013, the Phoenix Suns replaced interim head coach Lindsey Hunter with former Suns player and Utah Jazz assistant coach Jeff Hornacek.
- On May 28, 2013, the Atlanta Hawks replaced Larry Drew, whose contract was not renewed, with former San Antonio Spurs assistant coach Mike Budenholzer.
- On May 31, 2013, the Sacramento Kings announced that Keith Smart was fired as head coach.
- On May 31, 2013, the Milwaukee Bucks announced that Larry Drew replaced Jim Boylan as head coach.
- On June 2, 2013, the Sacramento Kings announced that Michael Malone will be the head coach for the 2013–14 season.
- On June 6, 2013, the Denver Nuggets announced that George Karl would not be returning as the head coach for 2013–14.
- On June 10, 2013, the Memphis Grizzlies announced that Lionel Hollins's contract was not renewed for 2013–14.
- On June 10, 2013, the Detroit Pistons named Maurice Cheeks the head coach for the 2013–14 season.
- On June 12, 2013, the Brooklyn Nets named Jason Kidd the head coach for the 2013–14 season.
- On June 25, 2013, the Denver Nuggets named Brian Shaw the head coach for the 2013–14 season.
- On June 25, 2013, the NBA approved a trade of an unprotected 2015 NBA first round draft pick, which included an anti-trade clause prohibiting the Clippers and Celtics from engaging in future transactions between each other, including the exchanging of players for the duration of the 2013–14 season, for the release of the contract of Doc Rivers from the Boston Celtics, freeing him up to sign with the Los Angeles Clippers.
- On June 27, 2013, the Memphis Grizzlies named Dave Joerger the head coach for the 2013–14 season.
- On July 3, 2013, the Boston Celtics named Brad Stevens the head coach for the 2013–14 season.
- On August 14, 2013, the Philadelphia 76ers named Brett Brown the head coach for the 2013–14 season.

==== In-season ====
- On February 9, 2014, the Detroit Pistons fired Maurice Cheeks of his head coaching duties and replaced him with John Loyer on an interim basis for the remainder of the season.

== Preseason ==
The Preseason began on October 5, 2013, and ended on October 25, 2013. Earlier in March 2013, Commissioner David J. Stern announced that the NBA would be playing its first preseason game in the Philippines on October 10, 2013, at the Mall of Asia Arena in Manila featuring the Houston Rockets versus the Indiana Pacers. The arena was also the venue of the 2013 FIBA Asia Championship.

== Regular season ==
The regular season began on October 29, 2013, with the Indiana Pacers hosting a game against the Orlando Magic. The regular season ended on April 16, 2014. The season featured the unveiling of national television games such as on Christmas Day along with Chicago Bulls at Brooklyn Nets, Oklahoma City Thunder at New York Knicks, Miami Heat at Los Angeles Lakers, Houston Rockets at San Antonio Spurs and Los Angeles Clippers at Golden State Warriors, along with other highly anticipated games.

=== Standings ===
==== By division ====
Eastern Conference

Atlantic Division	W	L	PCT	GB	Home	Road	Div	GP
y-Toronto Raptors	48	34	.585	–	26‍–‍15	22‍–‍19	11–5	82
x-Brooklyn Nets	44	38	.537	4.0	28‍–‍13	16‍–‍25	9–7	82
New York Knicks	37	45	.451	11.0	19‍–‍22	18‍–‍23	10–6	82
Boston Celtics	25	57	.305	23.0	16‍–‍25	9‍–‍32	5–11	82
Philadelphia 76ers	19	63	.232	29.0	10‍–‍31	9‍–‍32	5–11	82

Central Division	W	L	PCT	GB	Home	Road	Div	GP
c-Indiana Pacers	56	26	.683	–	35‍–‍6	21‍–‍20	12–4	82
x-Chicago Bulls	48	34	.585	8.0	27‍–‍14	21‍–‍20	11–5	82
Cleveland Cavaliers	33	49	.402	23.0	19‍–‍22	14‍–‍27	7–9	82
Detroit Pistons	29	53	.354	27.0	17‍–‍24	12‍–‍29	6–10	82
Milwaukee Bucks	15	67	.183	41.0	10‍–‍31	5‍–‍36	4–12	82

Southeast Division	W	L	PCT	GB	Home	Road	Div	GP
y-Miami Heat	54	28	.659	–	32‍–‍9	22‍–‍19	12–4	82
x-Washington Wizards	44	38	.537	10.0	22‍–‍19	22‍–‍19	10–6	82
x-Charlotte Bobcats	43	39	.524	11.0	25‍–‍16	18‍–‍23	6–10	82
x-Atlanta Hawks	38	44	.463	16.0	24‍–‍17	14‍–‍27	8–8	82
Orlando Magic	23	59	.280	31.0	19‍–‍22	4‍–‍37	4–12	82

Western Conference

Northwest Division	W	L	PCT	GB	Home	Road	Div	GP
y-Oklahoma City Thunder	59	23	.720	–	34‍–‍7	25‍–‍16	11–5	82
x-Portland Trail Blazers	54	28	.659	5.0	31‍–‍10	23‍–‍18	13–3	82
Minnesota Timberwolves	40	42	.488	19.0	24‍–‍17	16‍–‍25	7–9	82
Denver Nuggets	36	46	.439	23.0	22‍–‍19	14‍–‍27	5–11	82
Utah Jazz	25	57	.305	34.0	16‍–‍25	9‍–‍32	4–12	82

Pacific Division	W	L	PCT	GB	Home	Road	Div	GP
y-Los Angeles Clippers	57	25	.695	–	34‍–‍7	23‍–‍18	12–4	82
x-Golden State Warriors	51	31	.622	6.0	27‍–‍14	24‍–‍17	11–5	82
Phoenix Suns	48	34	.585	9.0	26‍–‍15	22‍–‍19	8–8	82
Sacramento Kings	28	54	.341	29.0	17‍–‍24	11‍–‍30	3–13	82
Los Angeles Lakers	27	55	.329	30.0	14‍–‍27	13‍–‍28	6–10	82

Southwest Division	W	L	PCT	GB	Home	Road	Div	GP
z-San Antonio Spurs	62	20	.756	–	32‍–‍9	30‍–‍11	12–4	82
x-Houston Rockets	54	28	.659	8.0	33‍–‍8	21‍–‍20	11–5	82
x-Memphis Grizzlies	50	32	.610	12.0	27‍–‍14	23‍–‍18	4–12	82
x-Dallas Mavericks	49	33	.598	13.0	26‍–‍15	23‍–‍18	9–7	82
New Orleans Pelicans	34	48	.415	28.0	22‍–‍19	12‍–‍29	4–12	82

==== By conference ====
Eastern Conference
#	Team	W	L	PCT	GB	GP
1	c-Indiana Pacers *	56	26	.683	–	82
2	y-Miami Heat *	54	28	.659	2.0	82
3	y-Toronto Raptors *	48	34	.585	8.0	82
4	x-Chicago Bulls	48	34	.585	8.0	82
5	x-Washington Wizards	44	38	.537	12.0	82
6	x-Brooklyn Nets	44	38	.537	12.0	82
7	x-Charlotte Bobcats	43	39	.524	13.0	82
8	x-Atlanta Hawks	38	44	.463	18.0	82
9	New York Knicks	37	45	.451	19.0	82
10	Cleveland Cavaliers	33	49	.402	23.0	82
11	Detroit Pistons	29	53	.354	27.0	82
12	Boston Celtics	25	57	.305	31.0	82
13	Orlando Magic	23	59	.280	33.0	82
14	Philadelphia 76ers	19	63	.232	37.0	82
15	Milwaukee Bucks	15	67	.183	41.0	82

Western Conference
#	Team	W	L	PCT	GB	GP
1	z-San Antonio Spurs *	62	20	.756	–	82
2	y-Oklahoma City Thunder *	59	23	.720	3.0	82
3	y-Los Angeles Clippers *	57	25	.695	5.0	82
4	x-Houston Rockets	54	28	.659	8.0	82
5	x-Portland Trail Blazers	54	28	.659	8.0	82
6	x-Golden State Warriors	51	31	.622	11.0	82
7	x-Memphis Grizzlies	50	32	.610	12.0	82
8	x-Dallas Mavericks	49	33	.598	13.0	82
9	Phoenix Suns	48	34	.585	14.0	82
10	Minnesota Timberwolves	40	42	.488	22.0	82
11	Denver Nuggets	36	46	.439	26.0	82
12	New Orleans Pelicans	34	48	.415	28.0	82
13	Sacramento Kings	28	54	.341	34.0	82
14	Los Angeles Lakers	27	55	.329	35.0	82
15	Utah Jazz	25	57	.305	37.0	82

Notes

- z – Clinched home court advantage for the entire playoffs
- c – Clinched home court advantage for the conference playoffs
- y – Clinched division title
- x – Clinched playoff spot
- * – Division champion

==== Tiebreakers ====
===== Eastern Conference =====
- Toronto clinched #3 seed over Chicago as the Raptors won the Atlantic Division and the Bulls finished second in the Central Division.
- Washington clinched #5 seed over Brooklyn based on head-to-head record (3–0).

===== Western Conference =====
- Houston clinched #4 seed over Portland based on head-to-head record (3–1).

== Playoffs ==
The 2014 NBA playoffs began on April 19, 2014, and concluded with the 2014 NBA Finals which began June 5, 2014. ESPN broadcast the Eastern Conference Finals, and TNT broadcast the Western Conference Finals.

=== Bracket ===
First Round	Conference Semifinals
E1	Indiana*	4
E8	Atlanta	3
E1	Indiana*	4
E5	Washington	2
E4	Chicago	1
E5	Washington	4
Eastern Conference
E3	Toronto*	3
E6	Brooklyn	4
E6	Brooklyn	1
E2	Miami*	4
E2	Miami*	4
E7	Charlotte	0
W1	San Antonio*	4
W8	Dallas	3
W1	San Antonio*	4
W5	Portland	1
W4	Houston	2
W5	Portland	4
Western Conference
W3	LA Clippers*	4
W6	Golden State	3
W3	LA Clippers*	2
W2	Oklahoma City*	4
W2	Oklahoma City*	4
W7	Memphis	3

Conference Finals
E1	Indiana*	2
E2	Miami*	4
W1	San Antonio*	4
W2	Oklahoma City*	2

NBA Finals
E2	Miami*	1
W1	San Antonio*	4

- * Division winner
- Bold Series winner
- Italics Team with home-court advantage

== Statistics leaders ==
=== Individual statistic leaders ===
Category	Player	Team	Statistics
Points per game	Kevin Durant	Oklahoma City Thunder	32.0
Rebounds per game	DeAndre Jordan	Los Angeles Clippers	13.6
Assists per game	Chris Paul	Los Angeles Clippers	10.7
Steals per game	Chris Paul	Los Angeles Clippers	2.48
Blocks per game	Anthony Davis	New Orleans Pelicans	2.82
Turnovers per game	Stephen Curry	Golden State Warriors	3.8
Fouls per game	DeMarcus Cousins	Sacramento Kings	3.8
Minutes per game	Carmelo Anthony	New York Knicks	38.7
FG%	DeAndre Jordan	Los Angeles Clippers	67.6%
FT%	Brian Roberts	New Orleans Pelicans	94.0%
3FG%	Kyle Korver	Atlanta Hawks	47.2%
Efficiency per game	Kevin Durant	Oklahoma City Thunder	29.9
Double-doubles	Kevin Love	Minnesota Timberwolves	65
Triple-doubles	Lance Stephenson	Indiana Pacers	5

=== Individual game highs ===
Category	Player	Team	Statistics
Points	Carmelo Anthony	New York Knicks	62
Rebounds	Timofey Mozgov	Denver Nuggets	29
Assists	Brandon Jennings	Detroit Pistons	18
Assists	Rajon Rondo	Boston Celtics	18
Steals	Michael Carter-Williams	Philadelphia 76ers	9
Blocks	Anthony Davis	New Orleans Pelicans	9
Blocks	DeAndre Jordan	Los Angeles Clippers	9
Three Pointers	Terrence Ross	Toronto Raptors	10
Three Pointers	Joe Johnson	Brooklyn Nets	10
Three Pointers	C. J. Miles	Cleveland Cavaliers	10
Three Pointers	Chandler Parsons	Houston Rockets	10
Three Pointers	Trevor Ariza	Washington Wizards	10
Three Pointers	J.R. Smith	New York Knicks	10

=== Team statistic leaders ===
Category	Team	Statistics
Points per game	Los Angeles Clippers	107.9
Rebounds per game	Portland Trail Blazers	46.4
Assists per game	San Antonio Spurs	25.2
Steals per game	Philadelphia 76ers	9.3
Blocks per game	New Orleans Pelicans	6.4
Turnovers per game	Philadelphia 76ers	16.9
Fouls per game	Denver Nuggets	23.0
FG%	Miami Heat	50.1%
FT%	Portland Trail Blazers	81.5%
3FG%	San Antonio Spurs	39.7%
±	San Antonio Spurs	7.7

== Awards ==
=== Yearly awards ===
- Most Valuable Player: Kevin Durant, Oklahoma City Thunder
- Defensive Player of the Year: Joakim Noah, Chicago Bulls
- Rookie of the Year: Michael Carter-Williams, Philadelphia 76ers
- Sixth Man of the Year: Jamal Crawford, Los Angeles Clippers
- Most Improved Player: Goran Dragić, Phoenix Suns
- Coach of the Year: Gregg Popovich, San Antonio Spurs
- Executive of the Year: R. C. Buford, San Antonio Spurs
- Sportsmanship Award: Mike Conley Jr., Memphis Grizzlies
- J. Walter Kennedy Citizenship Award: Luol Deng, Cleveland Cavaliers
- Twyman–Stokes Teammate of the Year Award: Shane Battier, Miami Heat

- All-NBA First Team:
  - F Kevin Durant, Oklahoma City Thunder
  - F LeBron James, Miami Heat
  - C Joakim Noah, Chicago Bulls
  - G James Harden, Houston Rockets
  - G Chris Paul, Los Angeles Clippers
- All-NBA Second Team:
  - F Blake Griffin, Los Angeles Clippers
  - F Kevin Love, Minnesota Timberwolves
  - C Dwight Howard, Houston Rockets
  - G Stephen Curry, Golden State Warriors
  - G Tony Parker, San Antonio Spurs
- All-NBA Third Team:
  - F Paul George, Indiana Pacers
  - F LaMarcus Aldridge, Portland Trail Blazers
  - C Al Jefferson, Charlotte Bobcats
  - G Goran Dragić, Phoenix Suns
  - G Damian Lillard, Portland Trail Blazers

- NBA All-Defensive First Team:
  - F Paul George, Indiana Pacers
  - F Serge Ibaka, Oklahoma City Thunder
  - C Joakim Noah, Chicago Bulls
  - G Andre Iguodala, Golden State Warriors
  - G Chris Paul, Los Angeles Clippers
- NBA All-Defensive Second Team:
  - F Kawhi Leonard, San Antonio Spurs
  - F LeBron James, Miami Heat
  - C Roy Hibbert, Indiana Pacers
  - G Jimmy Butler, Chicago Bulls
  - G Patrick Beverley, Houston Rockets

- NBA All-Rookie First Team:
  - Michael Carter-Williams, Philadelphia 76ers
  - Victor Oladipo, Orlando Magic
  - Trey Burke, Utah Jazz
  - Mason Plumlee, Brooklyn Nets
  - Tim Hardaway Jr., New York Knicks
- NBA All-Rookie Second Team:
  - Kelly Olynyk, Boston Celtics
  - Giannis Antetokounmpo, Milwaukee Bucks
  - Gorgui Dieng, Minnesota Timberwolves
  - Cody Zeller, Charlotte Bobcats
  - Steven Adams, Oklahoma City Thunder

=== Players of the week ===
The following players were named the Eastern and Western Conference Players of the Week.

Week	Eastern Conference	Western Conference	Ref.
Oct. 29 – Nov. 3	Michael Carter-Williams (Philadelphia 76ers) (1/1)	Kevin Love (Minnesota Timberwolves) (1/2)	
Nov. 4 – Nov. 10	Paul George (Indiana Pacers) (1/2)	Markieff Morris (Phoenix Suns) (1/1)	
Nov. 11 – Nov. 17	LeBron James (Miami Heat) (1/2)	Blake Griffin (Los Angeles Clippers) (1/3)	
Nov. 18 – Nov. 24	John Wall (Washington Wizards) (1/2)	LaMarcus Aldridge (Portland Trail Blazers) (1/3)	
Nov. 25 – Dec. 1	LeBron James (Miami Heat) (2/2)	Kevin Durant (Oklahoma City Thunder) (1/6)	
Dec. 2 – Dec. 8	Jordan Crawford (Boston Celtics) (1/1)	LaMarcus Aldridge (Portland Trail Blazers) (2/3)	
Dec. 9 – Dec. 15	Kyrie Irving (Cleveland Cavaliers) (1/1)	LaMarcus Aldridge (Portland Trail Blazers) (3/3)	
Dec. 16 – Dec. 22	Dwyane Wade (Miami Heat) (1/1)	Blake Griffin (Los Angeles Clippers) (2/3)	
Dec. 23 – Dec. 29	Chris Bosh (Miami Heat) (1/1)	Kevin Durant (Oklahoma City Thunder) (2/6)	
Dec. 30 – Jan. 5	Thaddeus Young (Philadelphia 76ers) (1/1)	David Lee (Golden State Warriors) (1/1)	
Jan. 6 – Jan. 12	Carmelo Anthony (New York Knicks) (1/2)	DeMarcus Cousins (Sacramento Kings) (1/1)	
Jan. 13 – Jan. 19	Paul George (Indiana Pacers) (2/2)	Kevin Durant (Oklahoma City Thunder) (3/6)	
Jan. 20 – Jan. 26	Paul Millsap (Atlanta Hawks) (1/1)	Kevin Durant (Oklahoma City Thunder) (4/6)	
Jan. 27 – Feb. 2	Kyle Lowry (Toronto Raptors) (1/1)	Goran Dragić (Phoenix Suns) (1/1)	
Feb. 3 – Feb. 9	Jared Sullinger (Boston Celtics) (1/1)	Kevin Durant (Oklahoma City Thunder) (5/6)	
Feb. 18 – Feb. 23	Kemba Walker (Charlotte Bobcats) (1/1)	Kevin Love (Minnesota Timberwolves) (2/2)	
Feb. 24 – Mar. 2	John Wall (Washington Wizards) (2/2)	James Harden (Houston Rockets) (1/2)	
Mar. 3 – Mar. 9	Carmelo Anthony (New York Knicks) (2/2)	James Harden (Houston Rockets) (2/2)	
Mar. 10 – Mar. 16	Al Jefferson (Charlotte Bobcats) (1/2)	Blake Griffin (Los Angeles Clippers) (3/3)	
Mar. 17 – Mar. 23	Joe Johnson (Brooklyn Nets) (1/1)	Kevin Durant (Oklahoma City Thunder) (6/6)	
Mar. 24 – Mar. 30	Nikola Vučević (Orlando Magic) (1/1)	Tim Duncan (San Antonio Spurs) (1/1)	
Mar. 31 – Apr. 6	Al Jefferson (Charlotte Bobcats) (2/2)	Dirk Nowitzki (Dallas Mavericks) (1/1)	
Apr. 7 – Apr. 13	Jeff Teague (Atlanta Hawks) (1/1)	Monta Ellis (Dallas Mavericks) (1/1)	

=== Players of the month ===
The following players were named the Eastern and Western Conference Players of the Month.

Month	Eastern Conference	Western Conference	Ref.
October – November	Paul George (Indiana Pacers) (1/1)	Kevin Durant (Oklahoma City Thunder) (1/4)	
December	LeBron James (Miami Heat) (1/2)	Kevin Durant (Oklahoma City Thunder) (2/4)	
January	Carmelo Anthony (New York Knicks) (1/1)	Kevin Durant (Oklahoma City Thunder) (3/4)	
February	LeBron James (Miami Heat) (2/2)	Blake Griffin (Los Angeles Clippers) (1/1)	
March	Al Jefferson (Charlotte Bobcats) (1/2)	Kevin Durant (Oklahoma City Thunder) (4/4)	
April	Al Jefferson (Charlotte Bobcats) (2/2)	Stephen Curry (Golden State Warriors) (1/1)	

=== Rookies of the month ===
The following players were named the Eastern and Western Conference Rookies of the Month.

Month	Eastern Conference	Western Conference	Ref.
October – November	Michael Carter-Williams (Philadelphia 76ers) (1/4)	Ben McLemore (Sacramento Kings) (1/1)	
December	Victor Oladipo (Orlando Magic) (1/2)	Trey Burke (Utah Jazz) (1/3)	
January	Michael Carter-Williams (Philadelphia 76ers) (2/4)	Trey Burke (Utah Jazz) (2/3)	
February	Victor Oladipo (Orlando Magic) (2/2)	Nick Calathes (Memphis Grizzlies) (1/1)	
March	Michael Carter-Williams (Philadelphia 76ers) (3/4)	Gorgui Dieng (Minnesota Timberwolves) (1/1)	
April	Michael Carter-Williams (Philadelphia 76ers) (4/4)	Trey Burke (Utah Jazz) (3/3)	

=== Coaches of the month ===
The following coaches were named the Eastern and Western Conference Coaches of the Month.

Month	Eastern Conference	Western Conference	Ref.
October – November	Frank Vogel (Indiana Pacers) (1/1)	Terry Stotts (Portland Trail Blazers) (1/1)	
December	Dwane Casey (Toronto Raptors) (1/1)	Jeff Hornacek (Phoenix Suns) (1/1)	
January	Jason Kidd (Brooklyn Nets) (1/2)	David Joerger (Memphis Grizzlies) (1/2)	
February	Erik Spoelstra (Miami Heat) (1/1)	Kevin McHale (Houston Rockets) (1/1)	
March	Jason Kidd (Brooklyn Nets) (2/2)	Gregg Popovich (San Antonio Spurs) (1/1)	
April	Steve Clifford (Charlotte Bobcats) (1/1)	David Joerger (Memphis Grizzlies) (2/2)	

== Notable occurrences ==
- The New Orleans Hornets officially renamed their franchise to New Orleans Pelicans to begin the 2013–14 season.
- The Charlotte Bobcats officially announced that the franchise would be renamed to the Charlotte Hornets for the 2014–15 season. This returned the Hornets name to Charlotte for the first time since the team now known as the Pelicans moved from Charlotte to New Orleans after the 2001–02 season.
- The Cleveland Cavaliers win the #1 pick in the NBA draft for the second time in three years, as well as the fifth time in franchise history (1971, 1986, 2003, and 2011 were the previous four times), and selected Canadian forward Anthony Bennett of UNLV.
- The NBA officially implements a tournament system in both of their Summer League systems; the Oklahoma City Thunder and Golden State Warriors were the inaugural champions of the Orlando and Las Vegas Summer League Tournaments, beating out the Houston Rockets and Phoenix Suns respectively.
- The Portland Trail Blazers officially announced that the Rose Garden would be renamed to the Moda Center before the start of the season.
- The NBA Finals returned to the 2–2–1–1–1 format for the 2014 Finals, with the owners approving the format on October 23. The NBA originally decided to have the NBA Finals enter a 2–3–2 format starting in the 1985 NBA Finals in order to accommodate commercial travelling from the east to the west and vice versa, as well as bring up economic advantages for marketing and newspapers at the time.
- The NBA experiments with on-court advertising beginning this season. The Indiana Pacers court at Bankers Life Fieldhouse was sponsored by the Indiana Economic Development Corporation with the slogan A State That Works. The Toronto Raptors court at Air Canada Centre was sponsored by the Bank of Montreal, while the New York Knicks court at Madison Square Garden was sponsored by Chase. The Miami Heat's American Airlines Arena court in November 2013, and the Golden State Warriors' Oracle Arena court on March 7, 2014, added Samsung Electronics as its on-court sponsor promoting the Samsung Galaxy. On January 11, 2014, the Philadelphia 76ers' Wells Fargo Center added PartyPoker.com as its on-court sponsor.
- On October 29, the regular season opened with a record of 92 international players on the opening night rosters. The San Antonio Spurs set an NBA record of 10 international players.
- The Brooklyn Nets start out their season with Joe Prunty coaching their games against the Cleveland Cavaliers and Miami Heat instead of their original head coach Jason Kidd. The reason why Prunty was coaching at the start of the Nets' season instead of Kidd was due to Kidd serving a coaching suspension for having a DUI in July 2013. Prunty would start the year off with 1–1 for the Nets before Kidd came back and coached the team for the rest of the season.
- Patrick Ewing coaches his first game ever as an interim head coach for the Charlotte Bobcats. He ended up coaching the Bobcats on November 8, 2013, against his former team, the New York Knicks, due to their coach Steve Clifford having heart surgery around that time period. He would end up losing that game 101–91.
- In a double overtime game on December 3, 2013, rookies Victor Oladipo of the Orlando Magic and Michael Carter-Williams of the Philadelphia 76ers recorded triple-doubles in the same game. Oladipo recorded 26 points, 10 rebounds and 10 assists in 52 minutes, while Carter-Williams recorded 27 points, 12 rebounds and 10 assists in 47 minutes. These were the first career triple-doubles for both players. This marked the first and only time in NBA history that two rookies have recorded triple-doubles in the same game. The last time that two players had recorded their first career triple-doubles in the same game was when Detroit Pistons Donnie Butcher and Ray Scott did it on March 14, 1964 (they were not rookies). It was also the first time that two opponents had recorded triple-doubles in the same game since Caron Butler and Baron Davis had done so on November 23, 2007. Philadelphia won the game 126–125.
- The planned regular season game in Mexico City between the San Antonio Spurs and Minnesota Timberwolves on December 4 was postponed after a generator malfunction inside the Mexico City Arena. The rescheduled game was played on April 8, 2014, at Target Center in Minneapolis.
- On December 6, 2013, Kyle Korver of the Atlanta Hawks set a new NBA record for most consecutive (regular season) games with a three-point field goal made with 90. The previous record holder was Dana Barros. The streak ended at 127.
- On December 11, 2013, Antawn Jamison of the Los Angeles Clippers became the 39th player in NBA history to reach 20,000 career points.
- On December 13, 2013, Kevin Garnett of the Brooklyn Nets surpassed 14,000 career rebounds, becoming only the tenth player in NBA history to do so. In reaching the milestone, Garnett also joined Kareem Abdul-Jabbar and Karl Malone as the only players to reach 25,000 points, 14,000 rebounds and 5,000 assists. He reached the milestone in the third quarter of a 99–103 road loss to the Detroit Pistons.
- On December 16, 2013, Joe Johnson of the Brooklyn Nets scored 29 points in the third quarter of a 130–94 win over the Philadelphia 76ers. In the quarter Johnson made 10 of 13 shots from the field and tied an NBA record with 8 of 10 three-pointers.
- On December 23, 2013, Dirk Nowitzki of the Dallas Mavericks passed Alex English for 13th place on the NBA's all-time scoring list with a 13-foot jumper in the opening minute of the third quarter of a 111–104 road win over the Houston Rockets.
- On December 25, 2013, Russell Westbrook of the Oklahoma City Thunder recorded the eighth triple-double on Christmas Day in NBA history. He recorded 14 points, 13 rebounds and 10 assists in 29 minutes in a 123–94 road victory over the New York Knicks. The win was also the largest margin of victory in a Christmas Day game in NBA history.
- On December 27, 2013, LeBron James of the Miami Heat passed Larry Bird and Gary Payton for 29th on the NBA's all-time scoring list. James did so in a 108–103 loss versus the Sacramento Kings.
- On January 16, 2014, the Houston Rockets scored a season-high 73 points in the first half, and a season-low 19 points in the second half. That 54-point disparity is the largest by a team in a game in NBA history. They ended up losing to the Oklahoma City Thunder 104–92.
- On January 24, 2014, Carmelo Anthony of the New York Knicks scored a career, franchise, and league season-high 62 points against the Charlotte Bobcats.
- On January 25, 2014, Terrence Ross of the Toronto Raptors scored a career-high 51 points against the Los Angeles Clippers. His 51 points tied a franchise-high. Ross recorded the lowest season scoring average the year of a 50-point game, averaging only 10.9 points.
- On January 31, 2014, the Brooklyn Nets recorded an all-time low of 17 rebounds in a 125–90 blowout loss to the Oklahoma City Thunder. This broke a record low of 18 rebounds that was originally recorded by the Detroit Pistons in a November 28, 2001 game against the Charlotte Hornets.
- David Stern officially retires as commissioner of the NBA on February 1, 2014. Adam Silver would end up taking his place as commissioner in the process, with Mark Tatum taking on the role of deputy commissioner in the process.
- The New Orleans Arena that the New Orleans Pelicans played under was re-branded as the Smoothie King Center on February 5, 2014. Therefore, while some of the earlier games played in New Orleans were under the New Orleans Arena name, further home Pelicans games, as well as the All-Star break that happened from February 14–16, 2014, ended up being mentioned as the Smoothie King Center from now until at least 10 more NBA seasons.
- On February 23, Jason Collins signed a 10-day contract with the Brooklyn Nets, becoming the first openly gay athlete in North America's four major professional sports.
- On March 3, LeBron James scored a career-high 61 points against the Charlotte Bobcats. His 61 points was also a franchise-high.
- On March 4, Russell Westbrook recorded the fastest triple-double since 1955. He recorded 13 points, 14 assists and 10 rebounds while playing only 20 minutes and 17 seconds against the Philadelphia 76ers.
- On March 16, 2014, with a 122–104 victory over the Utah Jazz, the San Antonio Spurs notched their 50th win of the season and extended their 50+ wins in a season streak to 15 seasons.
- The New York Knicks would assign former player and Chicago Bulls and Los Angeles Lakers coach Phil Jackson as the team's newest president of basketball operations on March 18, 2014.
- On March 27, The Philadelphia 76ers tied a league record of 26 consecutive losses. This mark is currently tied with the 2010–11 Cleveland Cavaliers.
- On April 11, 2014, Corey Brewer of the Minnesota Timberwolves scored a franchise record-tying and career-high 51 points against the Houston Rockets. He also joined Allen Iverson, Michael Jordan & Rick Barry as only players with 50 points & 6 steals in a game.
- The San Antonio Spurs won their franchise-record 18th straight win against the Indiana Pacers. The Spurs also finished March with a 16–0 record, the second time in franchise history that they recorded a perfect month going back to the 1995–96 NBA season during the same month.
- The Boston Celtics and the Los Angeles Lakers failed to qualify for the playoffs. This marked the first time in 20 seasons that both teams missed the playoffs in the same season. For the Lakers, it marked the first time in nine seasons that they missed the playoffs. With the New York Knicks also missing the playoffs, this marked the first time in NBA history that none of the three teams qualified for the playoffs.
- On April 25, 2014, TMZ leaked an audio recording of Los Angeles Clippers owner Donald Sterling allegedly making racist comments to his girlfriend, causing the NBA to launch an investigation. The team held a meeting the following day to discuss the incident. Both coaches and players reportedly expressed anger toward the comment and they briefly raised the possibility of boycotting Game 4 of their series against the Golden State Warriors before deciding against it. On April 29, 2014, Commissioner Adam Silver banned Sterling for life as well as fining him $2.5 million. Silver also began proceeding of forcing Sterling out of the league.
- On April 29, 2014, the Memphis Grizzlies and Oklahoma City Thunder played in their fourth straight overtime game, the first time in NBA playoff history that there have been four straight overtime games.

== See also ==
- List of NBA regular season records
