= Prentiss High School =

Coordinates: 31°36′15″N 89°52′2″W

Location
- 2429 Mississippi Avenue; Prentiss, Mississippi 39474; United States

Information
- Principal: Pete Howell
- Faculty: 47
- Grades: 7-12
- Enrollment: 619 (2008-2009)
- Colours: Black, red and white
- Fight song: Go Mighty Bulldogs
- Athletics conference: Mississippi Southeastern Conference
- Sports: Basketball, softball, track, baseball, football, volleyball, band, golf
- Mascot: Bulldog
- Nickname: PHS
- Team name: Bulldogs
- Rival: Bassfield Yellowjackets

Prentiss High School was a high school located in Prentiss, Mississippi, United States. It was a part of the Jefferson Davis County School District. It ceased operations at the end of the 2016–17 school year.

== Notable alumni ==
- Al Jefferson, basketball player for the Indiana Pacers of the NBA; while at Prentiss High he earned the Mississippi Mr. Basketball award
- John A. Polk, member of Mississippi State Senate
