= 2013 NBA draft =

Basketball player selection

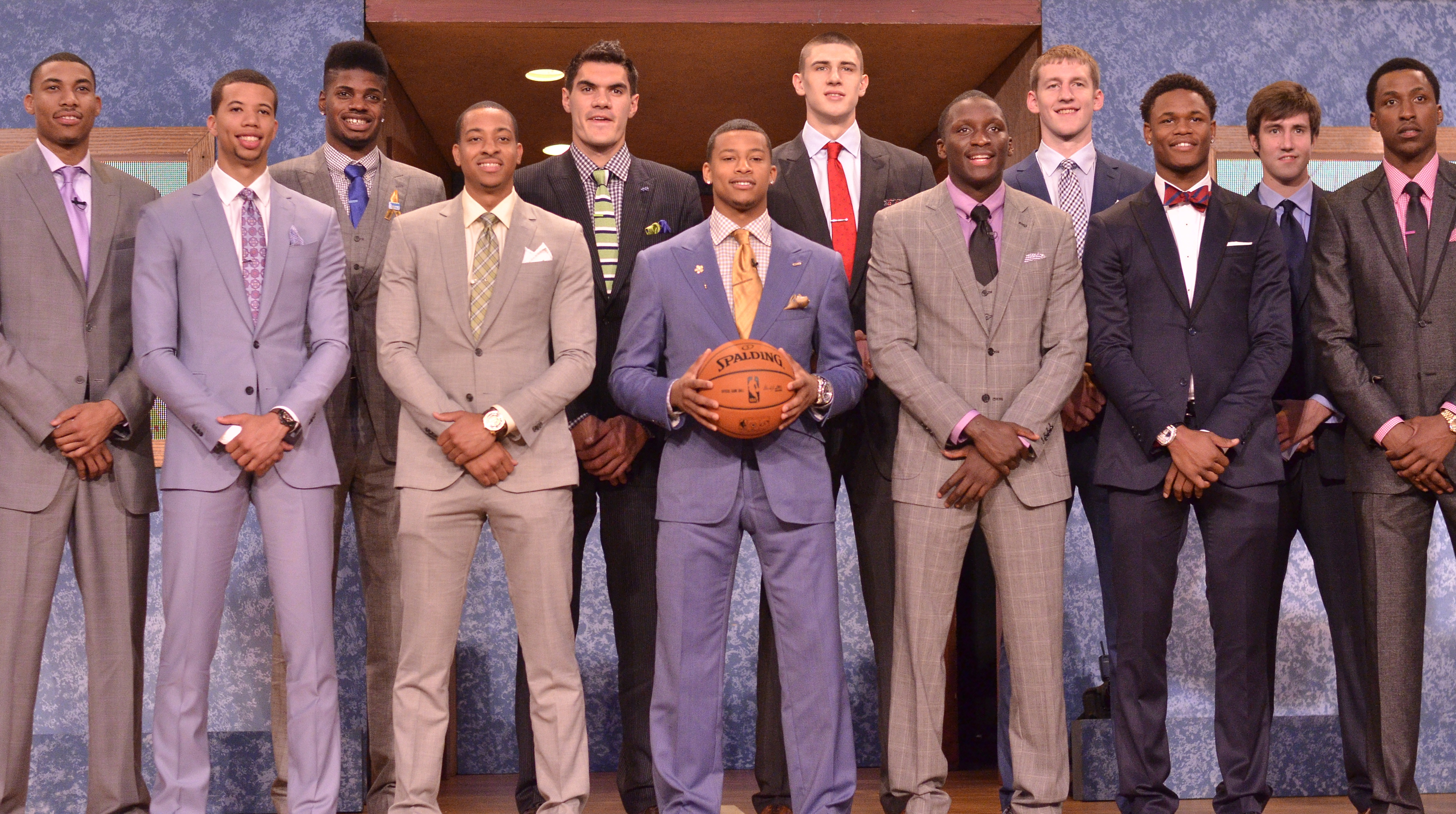

General information
- Sport: Basketball
- Date: June 27, 2013
- Location: Barclays Center (Brooklyn, New York)
- Network: ESPN

Overview
- 60 total selections in 2 rounds
- League: NBA
- First selection: Anthony Bennett (Cleveland Cavaliers)

The 2013 NBA draft was held on June 27, 2013, at the Barclays Center in Brooklyn, New York. National Basketball Association (NBA) teams took turns selecting amateur U.S. college basketball players and other eligible players, including international players. State Farm was the presenting sponsor. The lottery took place on May 21, 2013. This was the first draft for New Orleans under their new Pelicans name after playing as the New Orleans Hornets previously. It would also be the last draft for the Charlotte Bobcats under their old name, as they resumed playing under their old Hornets moniker that they last used in 2002 once the 2013–14 NBA season was over. Anthony Bennett, the first pick in the draft, had a very limited amount of media outlets considering him as a potential #1 pick in the draft. He bounced around the league and then was finally released by the Brooklyn Nets in January 2017 after averaging just 5.2 PPG.

The highlight of the draft was the Milwaukee Bucks’ selection of Giannis Antetokounmpo with the 15th overall pick, eventually becoming the best player of this class with two NBA MVP awards, one Defensive Player of the Year award, and an NBA championship in 2021. Another player from this draft, Rudy Gobert, won four Defensive Player of the Year awards. Michael Carter-Williams won the Rookie of the Year award that season. The draft also included the first Canadian number one overall selection (Anthony Bennett), the first Canadian pair of lottery picks (Bennett and Kelly Olynyk), the first Iranian draft choice (Arsalan Kazemi), the first New Zealander first round pick (Steven Adams), and the final first round draft selections announced by then-NBA commissioner David Stern, the last of which included a visit by Hakeem Olajuwon, the first pick Stern ever announced from the 1984 NBA draft. He was replaced by current commissioner Adam Silver beginning with the 2014 NBA draft.

== Draft selections ==
PG	Point guard	SG	Shooting guard	SF	Small forward	PF	Power forward	C	Center

*	Denotes player who has been selected for at least one All-Star Game and All-NBA Team
^{#}	Denotes player who has never appeared in an NBA regular-season or playoff game
^{~}	Denotes player who has been selected as Rookie of the Year

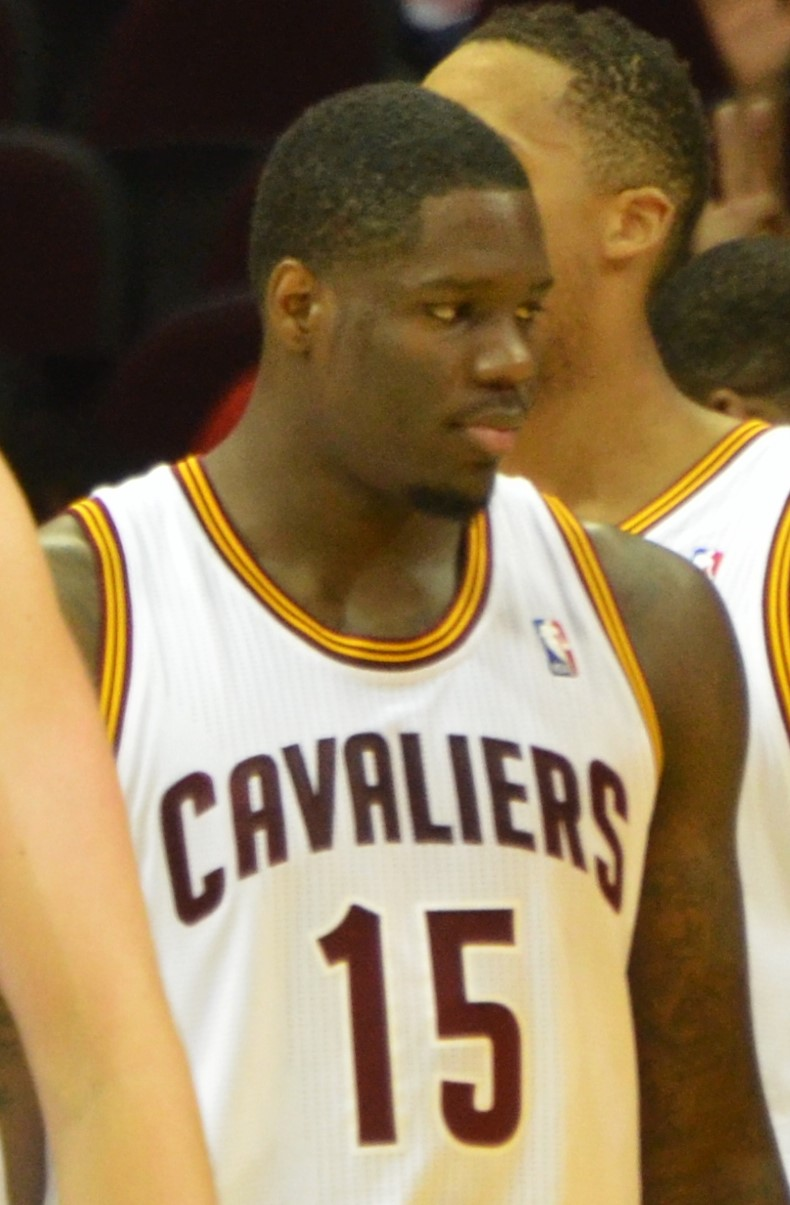
Anthony Bennett was selected as the #1 overall pick by the Cleveland Cavaliers.

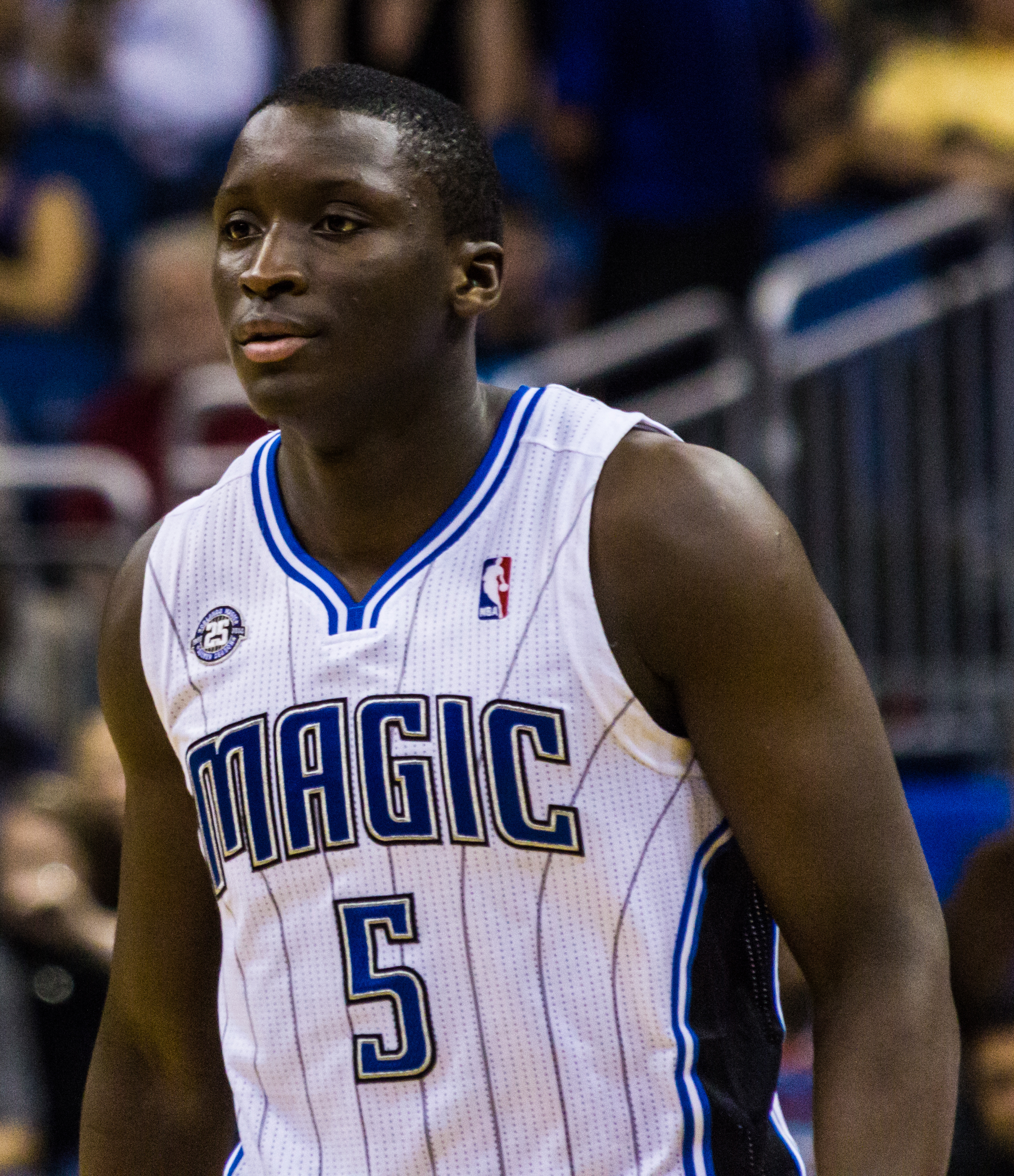
Victor Oladipo was selected 2nd overall by the Orlando Magic.

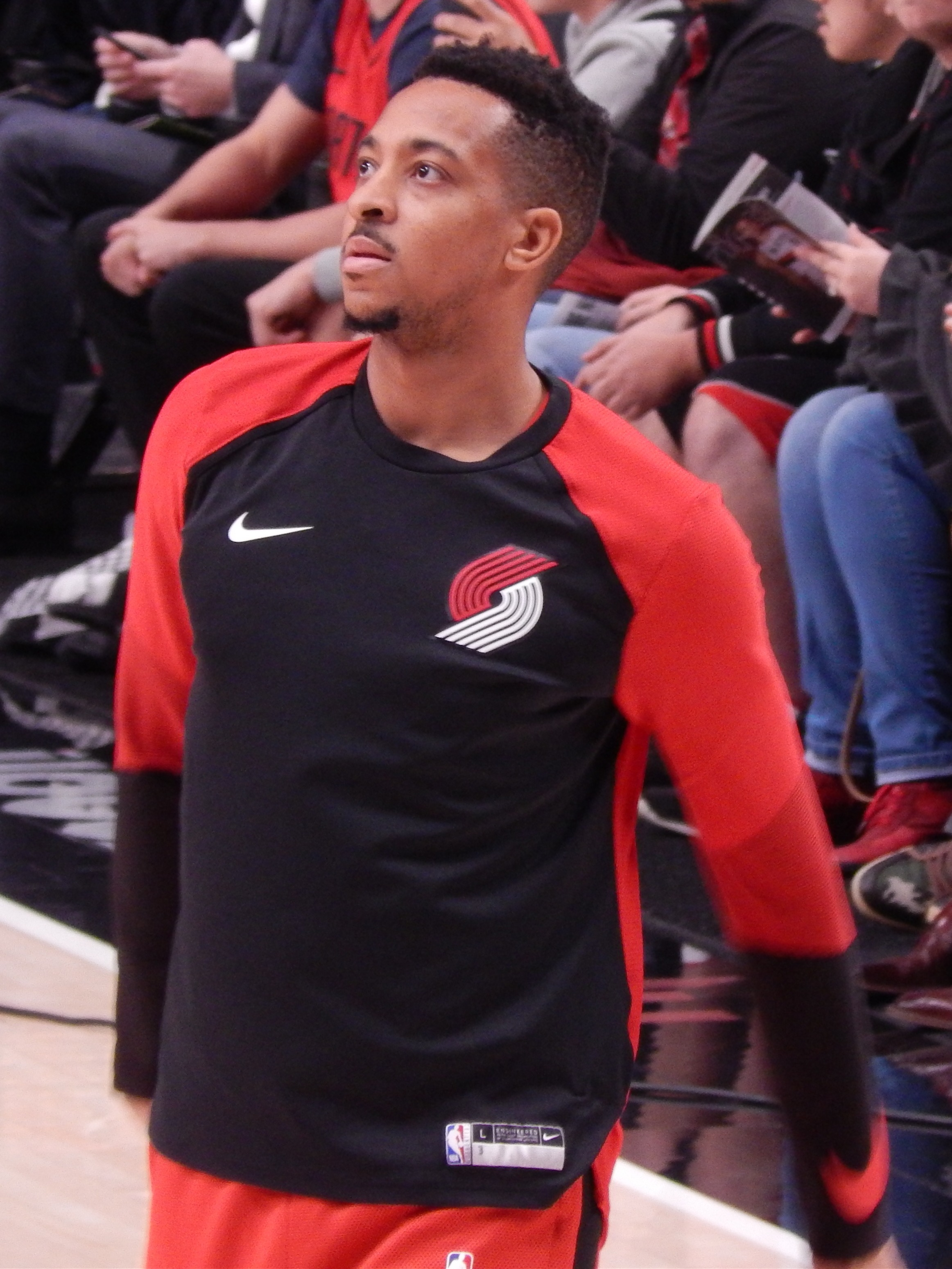
CJ McCollum was selected 10th overall by the Portland Trail Blazers.

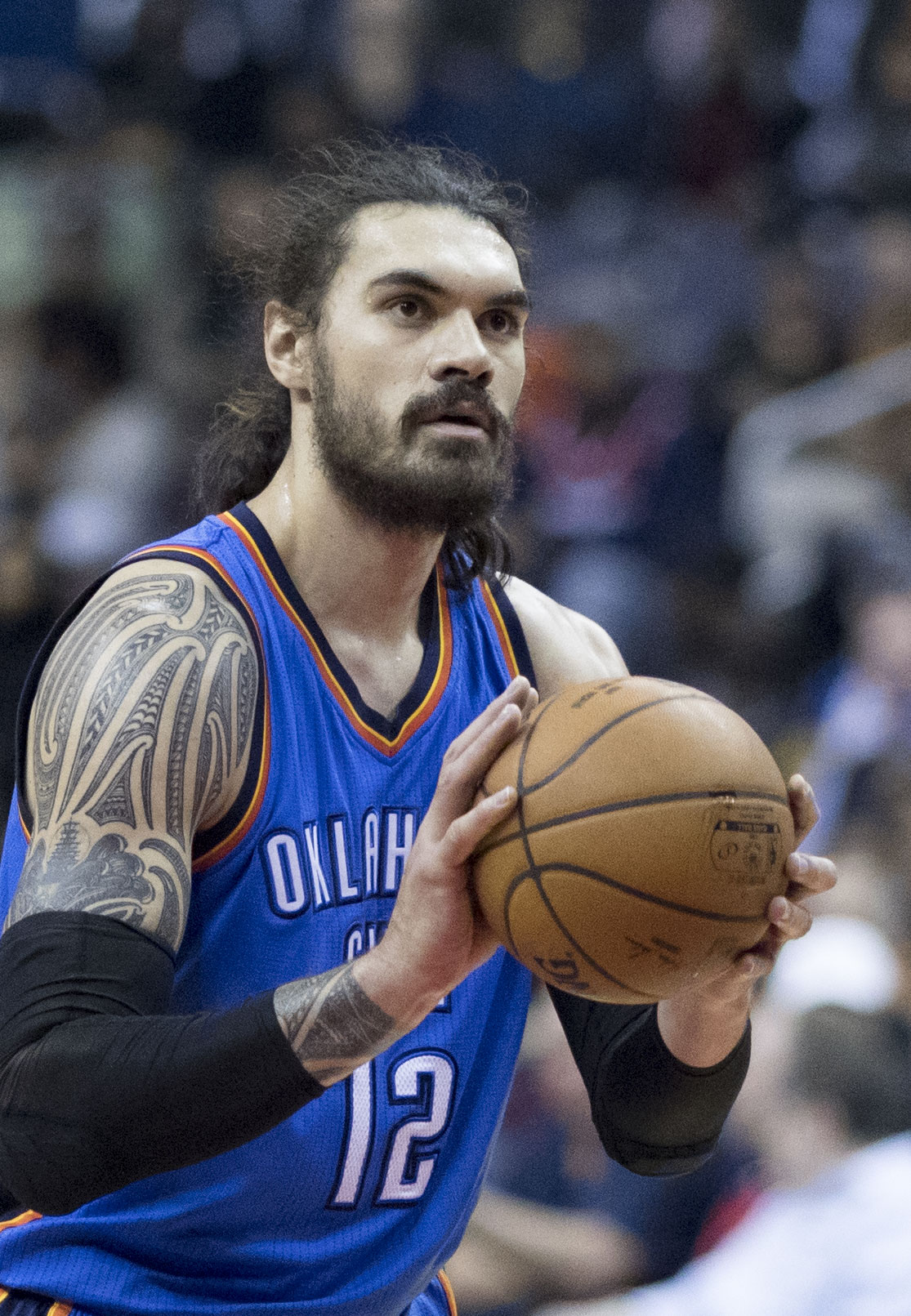
Steven Adams was selected 12th overall by the Oklahoma City Thunder.

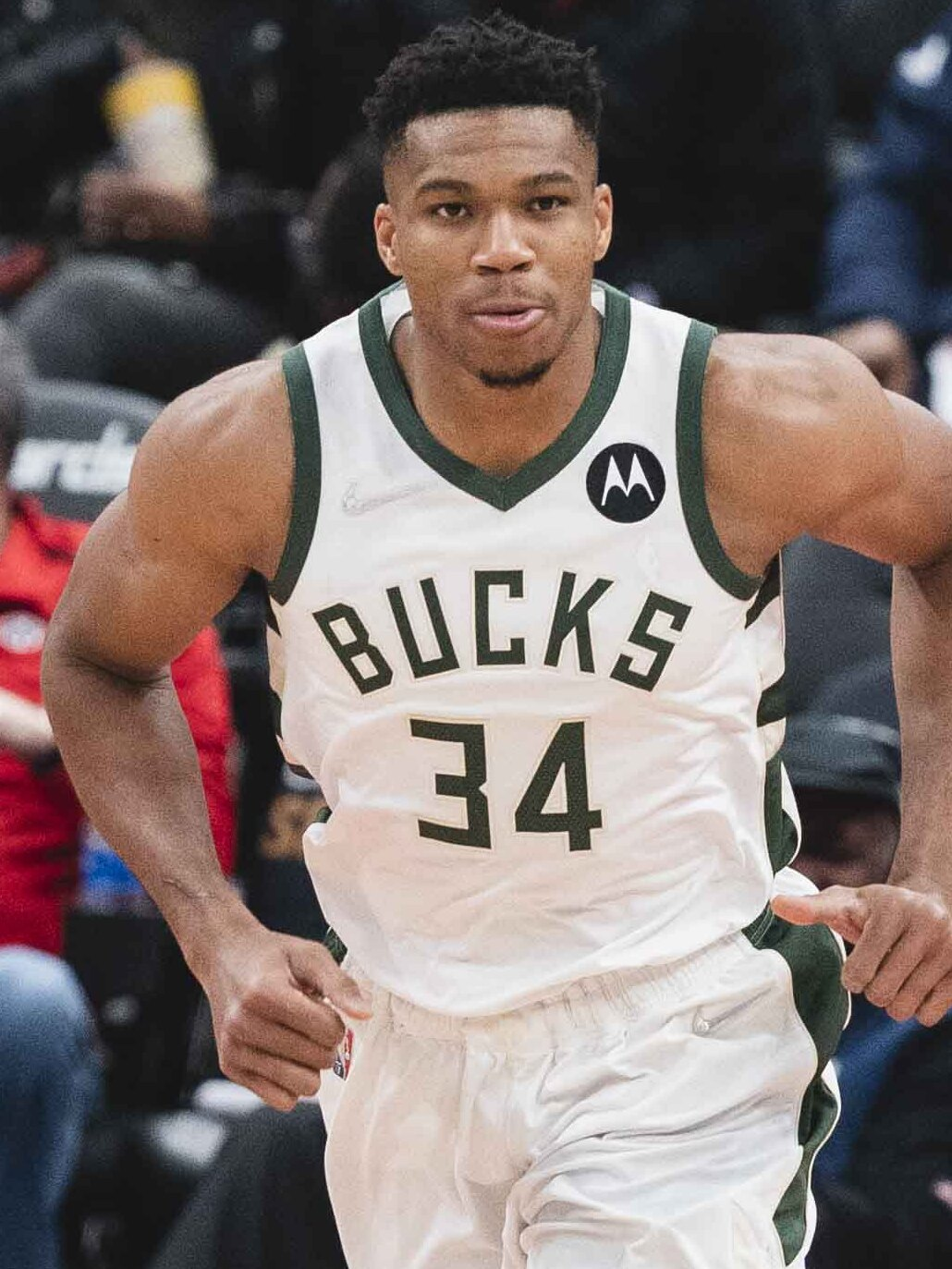
Giannis Antetokounmpo was selected 15th overall by the Milwaukee Bucks.

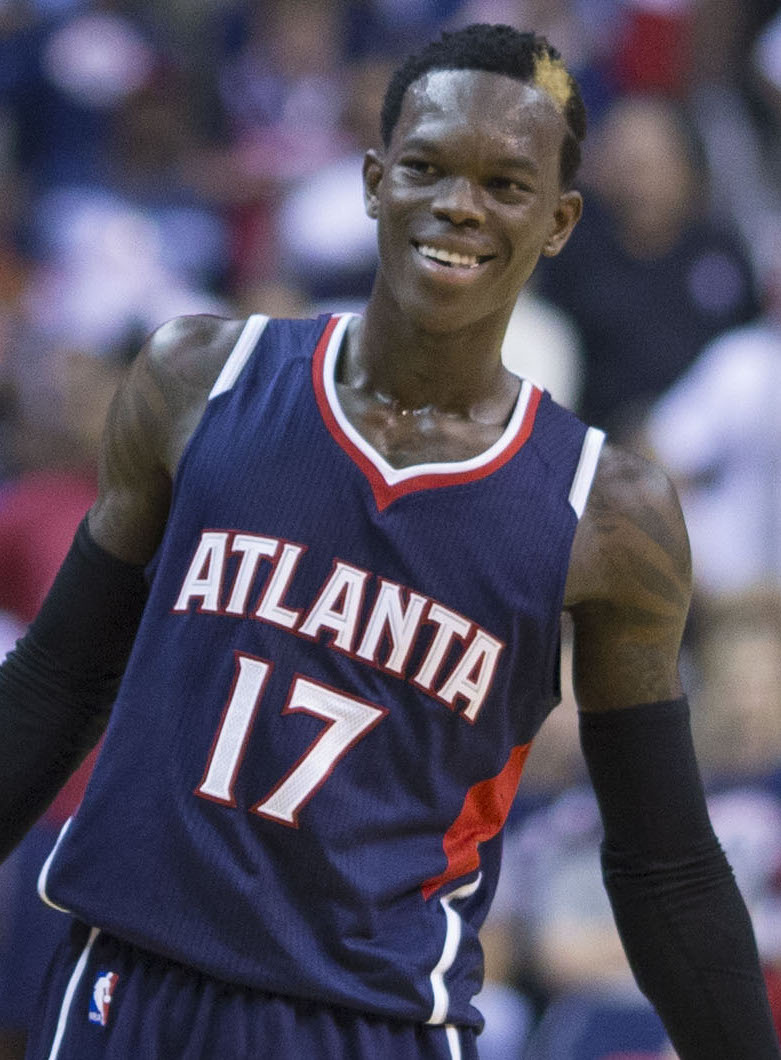
Dennis Schröder was selected 17th overall by the Atlanta Hawks.

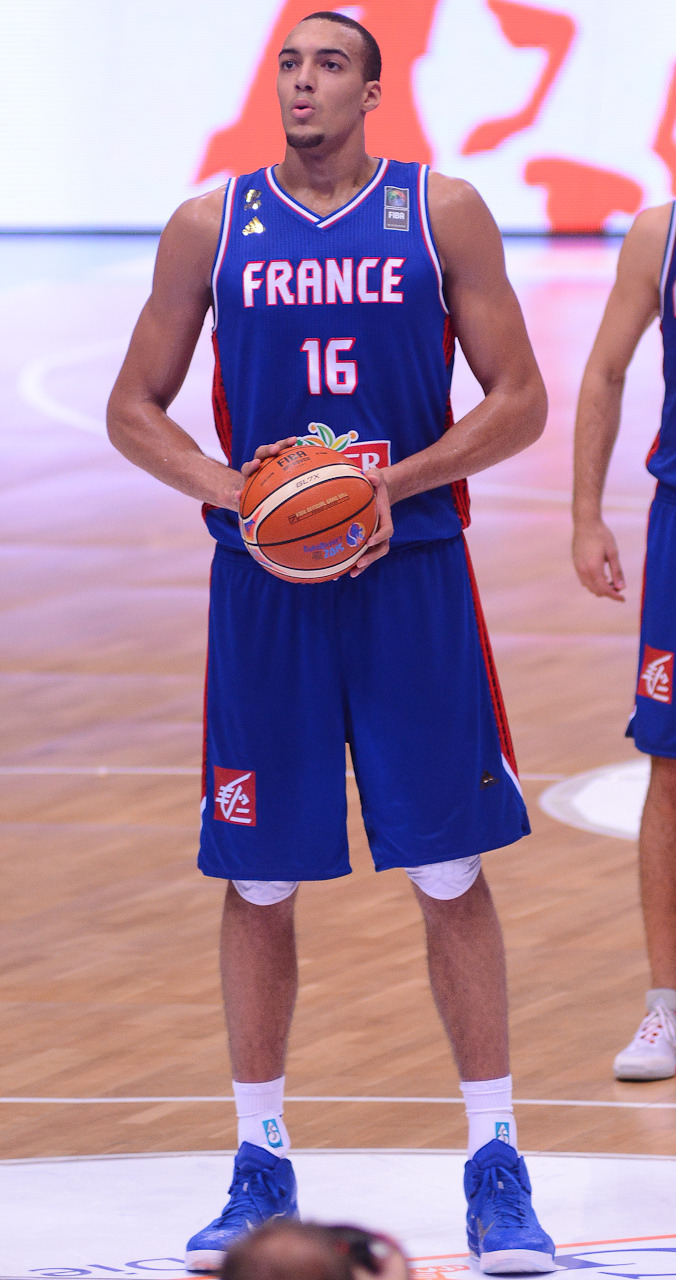
Rudy Gobert was selected 27th overall by the Denver Nuggets (traded to the Utah Jazz).

Rnd.	Pick	Player	Pos.	Nationality (Note: Nationality indicates the player's national team or representative nationality. If a player has not competed at the international level, then the nationality indicates the national team which the player is eligible to represent according to FIBA rules.)	Team	School / club team
1	1	Anthony Bennett	PF/SF	Canada	Cleveland Cavaliers	UNLV (Fr.)
1	2	Victor Oladipo^{*}	SG/PG	United States	Orlando Magic	Indiana (Jr.)
1	3	Otto Porter Jr.	SF	United States	Washington Wizards	Georgetown (So.)
1	4	Cody Zeller	C/PF	United States	Charlotte Bobcats	Indiana (So.)
1	5	Alex Len	C	Ukraine	Phoenix Suns	Maryland (So.)
1	6	Nerlens Noel	C	United States	New Orleans Pelicans (traded to Philadelphia) (Note: The New Orleans Pelicans traded 6th pick Nerlens Noel and a 2014 protected first-round pick to the Philadelphia 76ers in exchange for Jrue Holiday and 42nd pick Pierre Jackson.)	Kentucky (Fr.)
1	7	Ben McLemore	SG	United States	Sacramento Kings	Kansas (Fr.)
1	8	Kentavious Caldwell-Pope	SG	United States	Detroit Pistons	Georgia (So.)
1	9	Trey Burke	PG	United States	Minnesota Timberwolves (traded to Utah) (Note: The Minnesota Timberwolves traded 9th pick Trey Burke to the Utah Jazz in exchange for the 14th pick Shabazz Muhammad and the 21st pick Gorgui Dieng.)	Michigan (So.)
1	10	CJ McCollum	SG	United States	Portland Trail Blazers	Lehigh (Sr.)
1	11	Michael Carter-Williams^{~}	PG	United States	Philadelphia 76ers	Syracuse (So.)
1	12	Steven Adams	C	New Zealand	Oklahoma City Thunder (from Toronto via Houston) (Note: On July 5, 2012, the Oklahoma City Thunder acquired the 2013 first round pick (the 12th pick), a 2013 second-round pick (the 32nd pick), a future top-20 protected 1st-round pick (from the Dallas Mavericks), Kevin Martin, and Jeremy Lamb from the Houston Rockets in exchange for James Harden, Cole Aldrich, Daequan Cook, and Lazar Hayward. Previously, on July 5, 2012, Houston acquired Gary Forbes and a 2013 first-round draft pick (the 12th pick) from the Toronto Raptors in exchange for Kyle Lowry. Previously, on July 20, 2012, Houston acquired JaJuan Johnson, E'Twaun Moore, Sean Williams and the 32nd pick from the Boston Celtics in a sign-and-trade deal involving Courtney Lee. Previously, on June 26, 2012, Oklahoma City was forced to give Boston the 32nd pick in compensation for Jeff Green's heart problems. Previously, on December 19, 2011, Oklahoma City acquired the 32nd pick from the Charlotte Bobcats in exchange for Byron Mullens.)	Pittsburgh (Fr.)
1	13	Kelly Olynyk	C	Canada	Dallas Mavericks (traded to Boston) (Note: The Dallas Mavericks traded 13th pick Kelly Olynyk to the Boston Celtics in exchange for the draft rights to the 16th pick Lucas Nogueira and a pair of 2014 second-round picks.)	Gonzaga (Jr.)
1	14	Shabazz Muhammad	SG/SF	United States	Utah Jazz (traded to Minnesota)	UCLA (Fr.)
1	15	Giannis Antetokounmpo^{*}	PF	Greece (Note: Antetokounmpo was born in Greece to Nigerian parents. He holds dual citizenship and plays for the Greece national basketball team.)	Milwaukee Bucks	Filathlitikos (Greece)
1	16	Lucas Nogueira	C	Brazil	Boston Celtics (traded to Atlanta via Dallas) (Note: The Dallas Mavericks traded 16th pick Lucas Nogueira, guard Jared Cunningham and the No. 44 pick (Mike Muscala) to the Atlanta Hawks for the No. 18 pick, Shane Larkin.)	Estudiantes (Spain)
1	17	Dennis Schröder	PG	Germany	Atlanta Hawks	Phantoms Braunschweig (Germany)
1	18	Shane Larkin	PG	United States (Note: Larkin was granted Turkish citizenship in 2020 and plays for the Turkey national basketball team.)	Atlanta Hawks (from Houston via Brooklyn, (Note: On July 11, 2012, the Atlanta Hawks acquired the 2013 first round pick (the 18th pick) from the Brooklyn Nets as a part of Joe Johnson trade. Previously, on December 15, 2010, the Nets acquired Sasha Vujacic, and a conditional first-round draft pick from the Houston Rockets in a three-team trade.) traded to Dallas)	Miami (FL) (So.)
1	19	Sergey Karasev	SG/SF	Russia	Cleveland Cavaliers (from LA Lakers) (Note: On March 15, 2012, the Cleveland Cavaliers acquired Luke Walton, Jason Kapono, a conditional 2012 first round pick and the rights to swap the least favorable of 2013 first round picks in exchange for Ramon Sessions and Christian Eyenga. Cavaliers had their own pick (the 1st pick) and the Miami Heat's first round pick (the 30th pick), hence the option is exercised as Cavaliers received the Lakers' 19th pick and the Lakers received the Heat's 30th pick. Previously, on July 10, 2010, the Cavaliers received the 30th pick in a sign-and-trade deal with Miami for LeBron James.)	Triumph Lyubertsy (Russia)
1	20	Tony Snell	SF	United States	Chicago Bulls	New Mexico (Jr.)
1	21	Gorgui Dieng	C	Senegal	Utah Jazz (from Golden State via Brooklyn, (Note: On February 23, 2011, the Utah Jazz acquired Devin Harris, Derrick Favors, 2011 round pick and the 2013 first round pick (the 21st pick) from the Brooklyn Nets in exchange for Deron Williams. Previously, on July 22, 2008, the Nets acquired a conditional first-round draft pick (the 21st pick) from the Golden State Warriors in exchange for Marcus Williams.) traded to Minnesota)	Louisville (Jr.)
1	22	Mason Plumlee	C	United States	Brooklyn Nets	Duke (Sr.)
1	23	Solomon Hill	SF	United States	Indiana Pacers	Arizona (Sr.)
1	24	Tim Hardaway Jr.	SG	United States	New York Knicks	Michigan (Jr.)
1	25	Reggie Bullock	SF	United States	Los Angeles Clippers	North Carolina (Jr.)
1	26	André Roberson	SG/SF	United States	Minnesota Timberwolves (from Memphis via Houston, (Note: On June 23, 2011, the Minnesota Timberwolves acquired Brad Miller, rights to Nikola Mirotić and Chandler Parsons and a 2013 first round pick (the 26th pick) from the Houston Rockets in exchange for Jonny Flynn, rights to Donatas Motiejūnas and a 2012 second-round pick. Previously, on February 24, 2011, the Rockets acquired Hasheem Thabeet, DeMarre Carroll and a 2013 first-round draft pick from the Memphis in exchange for Shane Battier and Ish Smith.) traded to Oklahoma City via Golden State) (Note: The Minnesota Timberwolves traded 26th pick Andre Roberson and Malcolm Lee to the Golden State Warriors in exchange for a 2014 second-round pick and cash. Golden State then traded Roberson to the Oklahoma City Thunder in exchange for the 29th pick (Archie Goodwin) and cash.)	Colorado (Jr.)
1	27	Rudy Gobert^{*}	C	France	Denver Nuggets (traded to Utah) (Note: The Denver Nuggets traded 27th pick Rudy Gobert to the Utah Jazz in exchange for the 46th pick, Erick Green, and cash.)	Cholet Basket (France)
1	28	Livio Jean-Charles^{#}	SF	France	San Antonio Spurs	ASVEL Basket (France)
1	29	Archie Goodwin	SG	United States	Oklahoma City Thunder (traded to Phoenix via Golden State) (Note: The Golden State Warriors traded 29th pick Archie Goodwin and Malcolm Lee to the Phoenix Suns in exchange for 30th pick Nemanja Nedovic.)	Kentucky (Fr.)
1	30	Nemanja Nedović	SG	Serbia	Phoenix Suns (from Miami via Cleveland and LA Lakers, (Note: On June 11, 2012, the Phoenix Suns received the Los Angeles Lakers' 2013 first round pick (the 30th pick), a 2013 second round pick (the 57th pick), 2014 second round pick, and 2015 first round pick in a sign-and-trade deal for Steve Nash. Previously, on June 23, 2011, the Lakers acquired a future second round pick (the 57th pick) from the Denver Nuggets in exchange for the draft rights to Chukwudiebere Maduabum.) traded to Golden State)	Lietuvos Rytas (Lithuania)
2	31	Allen Crabbe	SG	United States	Cleveland Cavaliers (from Orlando, (Note: On June 24, 2011, the Cleveland Cavaliers acquired two future second round picks (including the 31st pick) from the Orlando Magic in exchange for Justin Harper.) traded to Portland) (Note: The Cleveland Cavaliers traded 31st pick Allen Crabbe to the Portland Trail Blazers for two future second round picks.)	California (Jr.)
2	32	Álex Abrines	SG/SF	Spain	Oklahoma City Thunder (from Charlotte via Oklahoma City, Boston and Houston)	FC Barcelona (Spain)
2	33	Carrick Felix	SG	United States	Cleveland Cavaliers	Arizona State (Sr.)
2	34	Isaiah Canaan	PG	United States	Houston Rockets (from Phoenix) (Note: On February 21, 2013, the Houston Rockets acquired the Phoenix Suns' 2013 second round pick (the 34th pick) in exchange for Marcus Morris.)	Murray State (Sr.)
2	35	Glen Rice Jr.	SG	United States	Philadelphia 76ers (from New Orleans, (Note: On January 4, 2012, the Philadelphia 76ers acquired the Memphis Grizzlies' 2012 second round pick and the New Orleans Hornets' 2013 second round pick (the 35th pick) in a three team trade involving Marreese Speights.) traded to Washington) (Note: The Philadelphia 76ers traded 35th pick Glen Rice Jr. to the Washington Wizards in exchange for 38th pick Nate Wolters and 54th pick Arsalan Kazemi.)	Rio Grande Valley Vipers (NBA D-League)
2	36	Ray McCallum Jr.	PG	United States	Sacramento Kings	Detroit (Jr.)
2	37	Tony Mitchell	PF	United States	Detroit Pistons	North Texas (So.)
2	38	Nate Wolters	PG	United States	Washington Wizards (traded to Milwaukee via Philadelphia) (Note: The Philadelphia 76ers traded 38th pick Nate Wolters to the Milwaukee Bucks in exchange for 43rd pick Ricky Ledo and a future second round draft pick.)	South Dakota State (Sr.)
2	39	Jeff Withey	C	United States	Portland Trail Blazers (from Minnesota via Cleveland and Boston) (Note: On July 20, 2012, the Portland Trail Blazers acquired Sasha Pavlovic, the 39th pick and the 45th pick from the Boston Celtics in a three team sign-and-trade deal involving Courtney Lee. Previously, on February 24, 2011, Boston acquired the 39th pick from the Cleveland Cavaliers in exchange for Semih Erden and Luke Harangody. Previously, on July 27, 2010, Cleveland acquired the 39th pick from the Minnesota Timberwolves along with Ramon Sessions and Ryan Hollins in exchange for Delonte West and Sebastian Telfair.)	Kansas (Sr.)
2	40	Grant Jerrett	PF	United States	Portland Trail Blazers (traded to Oklahoma City) (Note: The Portland Trail Blazers traded 40th pick Grant Jerrett to the Oklahoma City Thunder for cash.)	Arizona (Fr.)
2	41	Jamaal Franklin	SG	United States	Memphis Grizzlies (from Toronto via Dallas and Toronto) (Note: On June 30, 2013, the Memphis Grizzlies acquired Ed Davis, José Calderón, and a 2013 second round pick (the 41st pick) from the Toronto Raptors in a four team trade involving Rudy Gay. Previously, on January 23, 2011, Toronto acquired Alexis Ajinca and the 41st pick from the Dallas Mavericks in exchange for the draft rights to Giorgos Printezis. This pick was reacquired from a 2010 draft deal in which Toronto sent this pick to Dallas in exchange for the draft rights to Solomon Alabi.)	San Diego State (Jr.)
2	42	Pierre Jackson	PG	United States	Philadelphia 76ers (traded to New Orleans)	Baylor (Sr.)
2	43	Ricky Ledo	SG	United States	Milwaukee Bucks (traded to Dallas via Philadelphia) (Note: The Philadelphia 76ers traded 43rd pick Ricky Ledo to the Dallas Mavericks in exchange for a 2014 second round pick (Boston's 2014 pick in the Kelly Olynyk-Lucas Nogueira trade).)	Providence (Fr.)
2	44	Mike Muscala	C	United States	Dallas Mavericks (traded to Atlanta)	Bucknell (Sr.)
2	45	Marko Todorović^{#}	PF/C	Montenegro	Portland Trail Blazers (from Boston)	FC Barcelona (Spain)
2	46	Erick Green	PG	United States	Utah Jazz (traded to Denver)	Virginia Tech (Sr.)
2	47	Raul Neto	PG	Brazil (Note: Neto was born in Brazil and is of Italian descent. He holds dual citizenship and plays for the Brazil national basketball team.)	Atlanta Hawks (traded to Utah)	Gipuzkoa Basket (Spain)
2	48	Ryan Kelly	PF	United States	Los Angeles Lakers	Duke (Sr.)
2	49	Erik Murphy	PF	Finland (Note: Erik Murphy was born in France to an American father and a Finnish mother. He has dual U.S. and Finnish citizenship, but has chosen to represent Finland internationally.)	Chicago Bulls	Florida (Sr.)
2	50	James Ennis	SF	United States	Atlanta Hawks (from Houston, traded to Miami) (Note: The Atlanta Hawks traded 50th pick James Ennis to the Miami Heat for a future second-round pick.)	Long Beach State (Sr.)
2	51	Romero Osby^{#}	PF	United States	Orlando Magic (from Golden State via Denver) (Note: On August 10, 2012, the Orlando Magic acquired a 2013 second round pick (the 51st pick) from the Denver Nuggets in a four team trade involving Dwight Howard. Orlando also received draft picks in 2014, 2015, and 2017.)	Oklahoma (Sr.)
2	52	Lorenzo Brown	PG	United States	Minnesota Timberwolves (from Brooklyn via Minnesota and New Orleans) (Note: On June 23, 2011, the Minnesota Timberwolves acquired a 2013 second round pick (the 52nd pick) from the New Jersey Nets in exchange for the draft rights to Bojan Bogdanovic.)	NC State (Jr.)
2	53	Colton Iverson^{#}	C	United States	Indiana Pacers (traded to Boston) (Note: The Indiana Pacers traded 53rd pick Colton Iverson to the Boston Celtics for cash.)	Colorado State (Sr.)
2	54	Arsalan Kazemi^{#}	PF	Iran	Washington Wizards (from New York, (Note: On December 10, 2011, the Washington Wizards acquired Ronny Turiaf, a 2012 second round pick from the Dallas Mavericks and a 2013 second round pick (the 54th pick) from the New York Knicks in a three-team trade involving Tyson Chandler.) traded to Philadelphia)	Oregon (Sr.)
2	55	Joffrey Lauvergne	C	France	Memphis Grizzlies (traded to Denver) (Note: The Memphis Grizzlies traded Darrell Arthur and 55th pick Joffrey Lauvergne to the Nuggets for Kosta Koufos.)	Partizan Belgrade (Serbia)
2	56	Peyton Siva	PG	United States	Detroit Pistons (from Los Angeles Clippers) (Note: On February 16, 2009, the Detroit Pistons acquired the Los Angeles Clippers' 2013 second round pick (the 56th pick) in exchange for Detroit's 2011 second round pick and Alex Acker.)	Louisville (Sr.)
2	57	Alex Oriakhi^{#}	C	United States	Phoenix Suns (from Denver via LA Lakers)	Missouri (Sr.)
2	58	Deshaun Thomas^{#}	SF	United States	San Antonio Spurs	Ohio State (Jr.)
2	59	Bojan Dubljević^{#}	PF	Montenegro	Minnesota Timberwolves (from Oklahoma City) (Note: On December 13, 2011, the Minnesota Timberwolves acquired Robert Vaden, a 2012 second round pick and a future conditional second round draft pick (the 59th pick) from the Oklahoma City Thunder in exchange for Lazar Hayward.)	Valencia Basket (Spain)
2	60	Jānis Timma^{#}	SF	Latvia	Memphis Grizzlies (from Miami) (Note: On February 21, 2013, Memphis acquired Dexter Pittman and the Miami Heat's 2013 second round pick (the 60th pick) in exchange for the draft rights to Ricky Sánchez.)	BK Ventspils (Latvia)

== Notable undrafted players ==
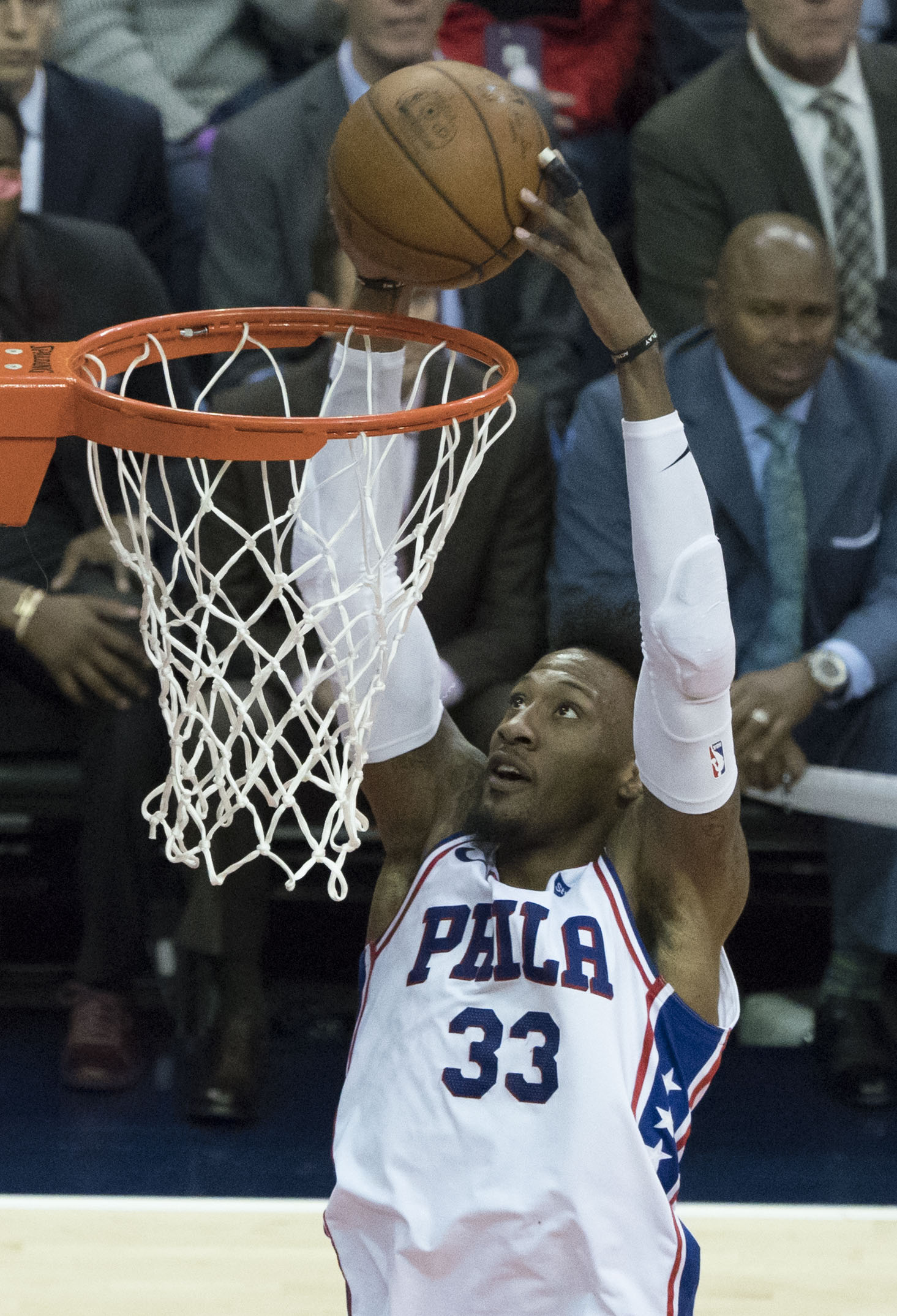
Robert Covington went undrafted, but went on to become a starter for the Philadelphia 76ers, and was later named to the NBA All-Defensive First Team in 2018.

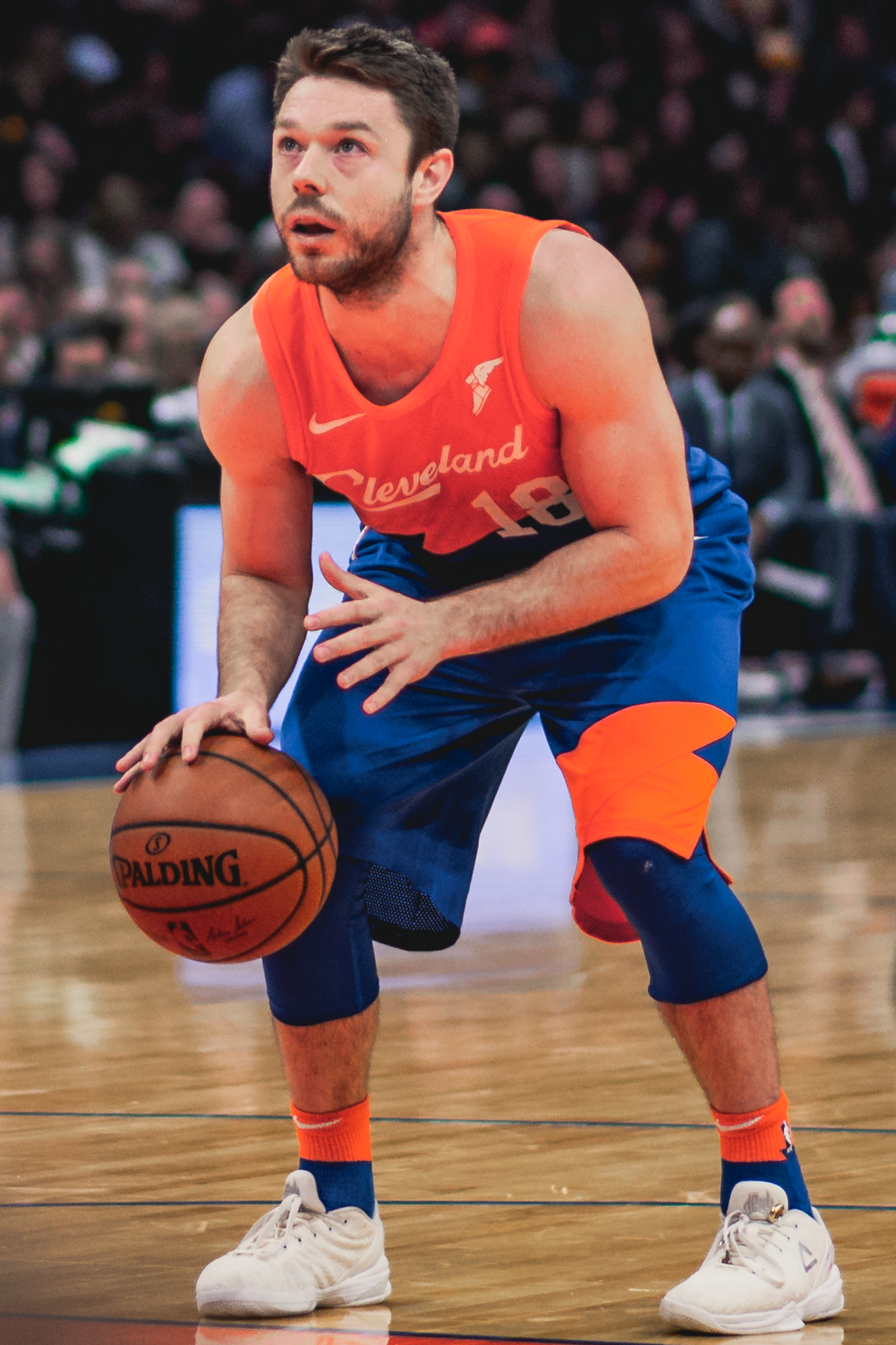
Matthew Dellavedova went undrafted, but played meaningful minutes with the Cleveland Cavaliers as their defensive specialist in back-to-back Finals appearances, winning the championship in 2016

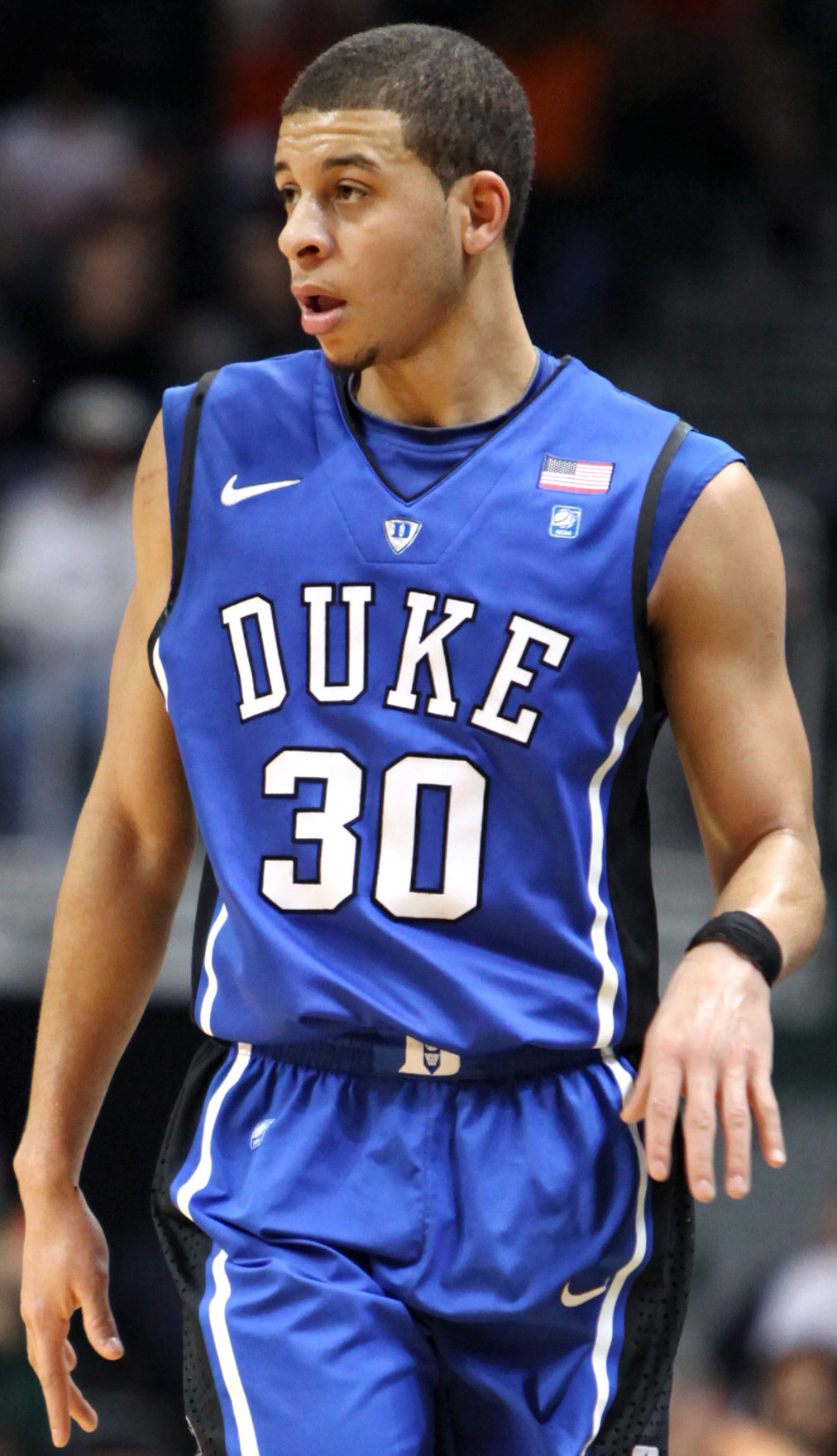
Seth Curry went undrafted, but was named a D-League All Star his first two seasons, eventually becoming a starter for the Philadelphia 76ers

These players were not selected in the 2013 NBA draft but have played at least one game in the NBA.

Player	Position	Nationality	School/club team
Chris Babb	SG	United States	Iowa State (Sr.)
Vander Blue	SG	United States	Marquette (Jr.)
Ryan Broekhoff	SF/SG	Australia	Valparaiso (Sr.)
Facundo Campazzo	PG	Argentina	Peñarol de Mar del Plata (Argentina)
Will Cherry	PG	United States	Montana (Sr.)
Ian Clark	SG	United States	Belmont (Sr.)
Jack Cooley	PF	United States	Notre Dame (Sr.)
Robert Covington	SF	United States	Tennessee State (Sr.)
Seth Curry	PG	United States	Duke (Sr.)
Troy Daniels	SG	United States	VCU (Sr.)
Brandon Davies	PF	United States	BYU (Sr.)
Dewayne Dedmon	C	United States	USC (Jr.)
Matthew Dellavedova	PG	Australia	Saint Mary's (Sr.)
Larry Drew II	PG	United States	UCLA (Sr.)
Elias Harris	F	Germany	Gonzaga (Sr.)
Reggie Hearn	SG	United States	Northwestern (Sr.)
Rodney McGruder	SG	United States	Kansas State (Sr.)
Trey McKinney-Jones	SG	United States	Miami (Florida) (Sr.)
Nicolò Melli	PF/C	Italy (Note: Melli was born in Italy to an American mother. He plays for the Italy national basketball team.)	Olimpia Milano (Italy)
Brandon Paul	SG	United States	Illinois (Sr.)
Phil Pressey	PG	United States	Missouri (Jr.)
James Southerland	SF	United States	Syracuse (Sr.)
D. J. Stephens	SF/SG	United States	Memphis (Sr.)
Daniel Theis	PF/C	Germany	Ratiopharm Ulm (Germany)
Adonis Thomas	SF/SG	United States	Memphis (So.)

== Eligibility and entrants ==
The draft is conducted under the eligibility rules established in the league's new 2011 collective bargaining agreement (CBA) with its players union. The CBA that ended the 2011 lockout instituted no immediate changes to the draft, but called for a committee of owners and players to discuss future changes. As of 2012, the basic eligibility rules for the draft are listed below.

- All drafted players must be at least 19 years old during the calendar year of the draft. In terms of dates, players eligible for the 2013 draft must be born on or before December 31, 1994.
- Any player who is not an "international player", as defined in the CBA, must be at least one year removed from the graduation of his high school class. The CBA defines "international players" as players who permanently resided outside the U.S. for three years prior to the draft, did not complete high school in the U.S., and have never enrolled at a U.S. college or university.

=== Early entrants ===
Player who are not automatically eligible must declare their eligibility for the draft by notifying the NBA offices in writing no later than 60 days before the draft. For the 2013 draft, this date fell on April 28. Under NCAA rules, players will only have until April 16 to withdraw from the draft and maintain their college eligibility.

A player who has hired an agent will forfeit his remaining college eligibility, regardless of whether he is drafted. Also, while the CBA allows a player to withdraw from the draft twice, the NCAA mandates that a player who has declared twice loses his college eligibility.

==== College underclassmen ====
Forty-five college players declared for the draft.

- (New Zealand) Steven Adams – C, Pittsburgh (freshman)
- (United States) C. J. Aiken – F, Saint Joseph's (junior)
- (Canada) Anthony Bennett – F, UNLV (freshman)
- (United States) Vander Blue – G, Marquette (junior)
- (United States) Lorenzo Brown – G, North Carolina State (junior)
- (United States) Reggie Bullock – F, North Carolina (junior)
- (United States) Trey Burke – G, Michigan (sophomore)
- (United States) Kentavious Caldwell-Pope – G, Georgia (sophomore)
- (United States) Michael Carter-Williams – G, Syracuse (sophomore)
- (United States) Adrien Coleman – G/F, Bethune-Cookman (junior)
- (United States) Allen Crabbe – G, California (junior)
- (United States) Dewayne Dedmon – C, USC (junior)
- (Senegal) Gorgui Dieng – C, Louisville (junior)
- (United States) Jamaal Franklin – G, San Diego State (junior)
- (United States) Kiwi Gardner – G, Midland College (sophomore)
- (United States) Archie Goodwin – G, Kentucky (freshman)
- (United States) Tim Hardaway Jr. – G, Michigan (junior)
- (United States) Grant Jerrett – F, Arizona (freshman)
- (Canada) Christian Kabongo – G, Morgan State (junior)
- (Canada) Myck Kabongo – G, Texas (sophomore)
- (United States) Shane Larkin – G, Miami (Florida) (sophomore)
- (United States) Ricky Ledo – G, Providence (freshman)
- (Ukraine) Alex Len – C, Maryland (sophomore)
- (United States) C. J. Leslie – F, North Carolina State (junior)
- (United States) Nurideen Lindsey – G, Rider (junior)
- (France) Amath M'Baye – F, Oklahoma (junior)
- (United States) Ray McCallum Jr. – G, Detroit (junior)
- (United States) Ben McLemore – G, Kansas (freshman)
- (United States) Tony Mitchell – F, North Texas (sophomore)
- (United States) Shabazz Muhammad – G/F, UCLA (freshman)
- (United States) Nerlens Noel – C, Kentucky (freshman)
- (United States) Victor Oladipo – G/F, Indiana (junior)
- (Canada) Kelly Olynyk – C, Gonzaga (junior)
- (United States) Otto Porter – F, Georgetown (sophomore)
- (United States) Marshawn Powell – F, Arkansas (junior)
- (United States) Phil Pressey – G, Missouri (junior)
- (United States) André Roberson – F, Colorado (junior)
- (United States) Trevis Simpson – G, UNC Greensboro (junior)
- (United States) Tony Snell – F, New Mexico (junior)
- (United States) Tahj Tate – G, Delaware State (sophomore)
- (United States) John Taylor – G, Fresno Pacific (junior)
- (United States) Adonis Thomas – G/F, Memphis (sophomore)
- (United States) Deshaun Thomas – F, Ohio State (junior)
- (United States) B. J. Young – G, Arkansas (sophomore)
- (United States) Cody Zeller – F/C, Indiana (sophomore)

==== International players ====
Fifteen players who did not attend college in the US or Canada between the ages of 18 and 22 declared for the draft.

- Álex Abrines – G/F, FC Barcelona (Spain)
- Giannis Antetokounmpo – G/F, Filathlitikos B.C. (Greece)
- (Hungary) László Dobos – C, Basket Zaragoza (Spain)
- Rudy Gobert – C, Cholet Basket (France)
- Livio Jean-Charles – F, ASVEL Basket (France)
- Sergey Karasev – G/F, BC Triumph Lyubertsy (Russia)
- (Brazil) Raulzinho Neto – G, Gipuzkoa BC (Spain)
- (Brazil) Lucas Nogueira – C, CB Estudiantes (Spain)
- Alexandre Paranhos – F, CR Flamengo (Brazil)
- (Croatia) Bogdan Radosavljević – C, FC Bayern Munich (Germany)
- Dennis Schröder – G, Basketball Löwen Braunschweig (Germany)
- Strahinja Stojačić – G, KK Smederevo (Serbia)
- Daniel Theis – F/C, Basketball Ulm (Germany)
- Jānis Timma – F, BK Ventspils (Latvia)
- (Montenegro) Marko Todorović – C, FC Barcelona (Spain)

=== Automatically eligible entrants ===
Players who do not meet the criteria for "international" players are automatically eligible if they meet any of the following criteria:

- They have completed 4 years of their college eligibility.
- If they graduated from high school in the U.S., but did not enroll in a U.S. college or university, four years have passed since their high school class graduated.
- They have signed a contract with a professional basketball team outside of the NBA, anywhere in the world, and have played under that contract.

Players who meet the criteria for "international" players are automatically eligible if they meet any of the following criteria:

- They are least 22 years old during the calendar year of the draft. In terms of dates, players born on or before December 31, 1991, are automatically eligible for the 2013 draft.
- They have signed a contract with a professional basketball team outside of the NBA within the United States, and have played under that contract.

In addition to every college players who has completed their college eligibility and every "international" players who was born on or before December 31, 1991, the following player would also be eligible for selection in the 2013 NBA draft:

- (United States) Glen Rice Jr. – G, Rio Grande Valley Vipers (NBA D-League)

== Draft lottery ==
The first 14 picks in the draft belong to teams that miss the playoffs; the order was determined through a lottery. The lottery determined the three teams that will obtain the first three picks on the draft. The remaining first-round picks and the second-round picks were assigned to teams in reverse order of their win–loss record in the previous season.

Below were the chances for each team to get specific picks in the 2013 draft lottery, rounded to three decimal places.

^	Denotes the actual lottery results

Team	2012–13 record	Lottery chances	Pick													
Team	2012–13 record	Lottery chances	1st	2nd	3rd	4th	5th	6th	7th	8th	9th	10th	11th	12th	13th	14th
Orlando Magic	20–62	250	.250	.215^	.178	.358	—	—	—	—	—	—	—	—	—	—
Charlotte Bobcats	21–61	199	.199	.188	.171	.319^	.123	—	—	—	—	—	—	—	—	—
Cleveland Cavaliers	24–58	156	.156^	.157	.156	.226	.265	.040	—	—	—	—	—	—	—	—
Phoenix Suns	25–57	119	.119	.126	.133	.099	.351^	.161	.013	—	—	—	—	—	—	—
New Orleans Pelicans	27–55	88	.088	.097	.107	—	.262	.360^	.161	.012	—	—	—	—	—	—
Sacramento Kings	28–54	63	.063	.071	.081	—	—	.440	.304^	.040	.001	—	—	—	—	—
Detroit Pistons	29–53	36	.036	.042	.049	—	—	—	.599	.253^	.021	.000	—	—	—	—
Washington Wizards	29–53	35	.035	.041	.048^	—	—	—	—	.703	.165	.008	.000	—	—	—
Minnesota Timberwolves	31–51	17	.017	.020	.024	—	—	—	—	—	.813^	.122	.004	.000	—	—
Portland Trail Blazers	33–49	11	.011	.013	.016	—	—	—	—	—	—	.870^	.089	.002	.000	—
Philadelphia 76ers	34–48	8	.008	.010	.012	—	—	—	—	—	—	—	.907^	.063	.001	.000
Toronto Raptors	34–48	7	.007	.008	.010	—	—	—	—	—	—	—	—	.935^	.039	.000
Dallas Mavericks	41–41	6	.006	.007	.009	—	—	—	—	—	—	—	—	—	.960^	.018
Utah Jazz	43–39	5	.005	.006	.007	—	—	—	—	—	—	—	—	—	—	.982^

1: Toronto Raptors' pick was conveyed to the Oklahoma City Thunder.

== Invited attendees ==
The 2013 NBA draft is considered to be the 35th NBA draft to have utilized what is properly considered the "green room" experience for NBA prospects. The NBA's green room is a staging area where anticipated draftees often sit with their families and representatives, waiting for their names to be called on draft night. Often being positioned either in front of or to the side of the podium (in this case, being positioned somewhere within the Barclays Center following what became the first season of the Brooklyn Nets under their new team name), once a player heard his name, he would walk to the podium to shake hands and take promotional photos with the NBA commissioner. From there, the players often conducted interviews with various media outlets while backstage. From there, the players often conducted interviews with various media outlets while backstage. However, once the NBA draft started to air nationally on TV starting with the 1980 NBA draft, the green room evolved from players waiting to hear their name called and then shaking hands with these select players who were often called to the hotel to take promotional pictures with the NBA commissioner a day or two after the draft concluded to having players in real-time waiting to hear their names called up and then shaking hands with David Stern, the NBA's commissioner at the time for the final time he would announce the names being selected by the drafting teams in question during the NBA draft.

The NBA compiled its list of green room invites through collective voting by the NBA's team presidents and general managers alike, which in this year's case belonged to only what they believed were the top 14 prospects at the time. Despite having an equal number of invites for this year's draft with the previous year's draft, there would still be some notable discrepancies involved between the invite for Sergey Karasev (the #19 pick) retrospectively going to future Hall of Famer Giannis Antetokounmpo (the #15 pick) alongside having an invite sent out to Shabazz Muhammad (the #14 pick) for a perfect top 15 listing and a missing invitation for future All-Star and All-NBA Team member Rudy Gobert (the #27 pick) to go with the aforementioned invite for Giannis Antetokounmpo for good measure. With that in mind, the following players were invited to attend this year's draft festivities live and in person.

- (New Zealand) Steven Adams, Pittsburgh
- (Canada) Anthony Bennett, UNLV
- (United States) Trey Burke, Michigan
- (United States) Kentavious Caldwell-Pope, Georgia
- (United States) Michael Carter-Williams, Syracuse
- Sergey Karasev, Triumph Lyubertsy (Russia)
- (Ukraine) Alex Len, Maryland
- (United States) CJ McCollum, Lehigh
- (United States) Ben McLemore, Kansas
- (United States) Nerlens Noel, Kentucky
- (United States) Victor Oladipo, Indiana
- (United States) Otto Porter, Georgetown
- (United States) Cody Zeller, Indiana

== Trades involving draft picks ==
=== Pre-draft trades ===
Prior to the day of the draft, the following trades were made and resulted in exchanges of draft picks between the teams.

=== Draft-day trades ===
The following trades involving drafted players were made on the day of the draft.

== See also ==
- List of first overall NBA draft picks
