= Christian Kabongo =

Canadian basketball player

Free agent
- Position: Point guard

Personal information
- Born: October 9, 1990 (age 36) Montreal, Quebec
- Listed height: 6 ft 5 in (1.96 m)
- Listed weight: 200 lb (91 kg)

Career information
- High school: Central Commerce Collegiate (Toronto, Ontario); God's Academy (Dallas, Texas)
- College: New Mexico State (2010–2012)
- NBA draft: 2013: undrafted
- Playing career: 2013–present

Career history
- 2013–2014: Idaho Stampede
- 2015: London Lightning

Kalenda Christian Kabongo (born October 9, 1990) is a Canadian professional basketball player who last played for the London Lightning of the National Basketball League of Canada (NBL). He played college basketball at New Mexico State University.

== High school career ==
Kabongo attended Central Commerce Institute in Toronto for his first three years of high school. He then transferred to God's Academy in Dallas, Texas for his senior year. Hoopscoop.com listed him as the fourth-best fifth-year player in the nation for the 2010 class. In 2008, his AAU team won the Adidas Super 64 Tournament.

College recruiting
| Name | Hometown | School | Height | Weight | Commit date |
|---|---|---|---|---|---|
| Christian Kabongo; PG | Toronto, Ontario | God's Academy | 6 ft 4 in (1.93 m) | 200 lb (91 kg) | May 10, 2010 |
| Christian Kabongo; PG | Recruit ratings: Scout: Rivals: 247Sports: ESPN: (87) | | | | |

== Collegiate career ==
In his freshman season at New Mexico State, Kabongo played in 33 games while making 14 starts. He averaged 8.9 points a game and had 82 assists and 29 steals as well. In his first career start, he had a career high 14 points. In his sophomore season, he averaged 14.6 points in just 11 games after sustaining an injury. In 2012, he transferred to Morgan State but had to sit out the 2012–13 season due to NCAA transfer rules. After the season, he decided to forgo his final 2 years of eligibility and declared for the NBA draft, despite a very low draft stock.

== Professional career ==
Kabongo went undrafted in 2013 NBA draft. On November 4, 2013, he was acquired by the Idaho Stampede. However, he was later waived by the Stampede on November 20, 2013. On December 18, 2013, he was re-acquired by the Stampede. On January 10, 2014, he was again waived by the Stampede after playing just 8 games.

== Personal ==
Kabongo is the son of Freddy Kelenda Kabongo and Yala Niemba.
