= 2009–10 Chicago Bulls season =

NBA professional basketball team season

- Head coach: Vinny Del Negro
- General manager: Gar Forman
- Owners: Jerry Reinsdorf
- Arena: United Center

Results
- Record: 41–41 (.500)
- Place: Division: 3rd (Central); Conference: 8th (Eastern)
- Playoff finish: First Round (lost to Cavaliers 1–4)
- Stats at Basketball Reference

Local media
- Television: CSN Chicago (42 games); CSN Chicago Plus (3 games); WGN America (14 games); WGN (24 games); WCIU (9 games)
- Radio: WMVP

The 2009–10 Chicago Bulls season was the 44th season of the franchise in the National Basketball Association (NBA). They finished with a record of 41-41 (.500) for the third time in their past five seasons.

In the playoffs, the Bulls lost to the Cleveland Cavaliers in five games in the First Round.

== Key dates ==
- June 25: The 2009 NBA draft took place in New York City.
- July 1: Start of the free agency period.

== Offseason ==
On May 20, the Bulls promoted Gar Forman to General Manager. Former GM John Paxson accepted a new role as executive vice president of basketball operations. Forman's top priority for the offseason was to re-sign Ben Gordon. Ben Gordon signed with the Detroit Pistons on July 1, 2009.

=== NBA draft ===
Round	Pick	Player	Position	Nationality	School/Club team
1	16	James Johnson	F	United States	Wake Forest
1	26	Taj Gibson	F	United States	USC

=== Free agency ===
On July 13, 2009, the Bulls signed guard Jannero Pargo to a one-year deal, helping to fill the void Ben Gordon made in leaving the team. On July 14, the Bulls re-signed guard Lindsey Hunter with a one-year contract.

== Regular season summary ==
On January 25, 2010, the Bulls traded center Aaron Gray for guard Devin Brown of the New Orleans Hornets. On February 18, 2010, the Bulls traded guard John Salmons for forwards Hakim Warrick and Joe Alexander of the Milwaukee Bucks. Meanwhile, the Bulls traded forward Tyrus Thomas for guards Ronald Murray and Acie Law of the Charlotte Bobcats.

== Roster ==
2009–10 Chicago Bulls roster
Players

Pos.	No.	Player	Height	Weight	DOB	From
F	20	Joe Alexander	6 ft 8 in (2.03 m)	230 lb (104 kg)	1986–12–26	West Virginia
G/F	32	Devin Brown	6 ft 5 in (1.96 m)	220 lb (100 kg)	1978–12–30	Texas–San Antonio
F	9	Luol Deng	6 ft 9 in (2.06 m)	220 lb (100 kg)	1985–04–16	Duke
F	22	Taj Gibson	6 ft 9 in (2.06 m)	225 lb (102 kg)	1985–06–24	USC
G	12	Kirk Hinrich	6 ft 3 in (1.91 m)	190 lb (86 kg)	1981–01–02	Kansas
F	16	James Johnson	6 ft 9 in (2.06 m)	245 lb (111 kg)	1987–02–20	Wake Forest
F	31	Rob Kurz	6 ft 9 in (2.06 m)	230 lb (104 kg)	1985–03–05	Notre Dame
G	0	Acie Law	6 ft 3 in (1.91 m)	195 lb (88 kg)	1985–01–25	Texas A&M
F/C	52	Brad Miller	7 ft 0 in (2.13 m)	261 lb (118 kg)	1976–04–12	Purdue
G	6	Ronald Murray	6 ft 3 in (1.91 m)	200 lb (91 kg)	1979–07–29	Shaw
F/C	13	Joakim Noah	6 ft 11 in (2.11 m)	232 lb (105 kg)	1985–02–25	Florida
G	2	Jannero Pargo	6 ft 1 in (1.85 m)	185 lb (84 kg)	1979–10–22	Arkansas
F/C	35	Chris Richard	6 ft 9 in (2.06 m)	256 lb (116 kg)	1984–12–25	Florida
G	1	Derrick Rose	6 ft 3 in (1.91 m)	190 lb (86 kg)	1988–10–04	Memphis
F/C	21	Hakim Warrick	6 ft 9 in (2.06 m)	219 lb (99 kg)	1982–07–08	Syracuse

Coaches
Head coach
- Vinny Del Negro
Assistant(s)
- Bernie Bickerstaff
- Pete Myers
- Bob Ociepka
- Dave Severns
- Mike Wilhelm
- Fred Tedeschi (trainer)

Legend
- (DP) Unsigned draft pick
- (FA) Free agent
- (S) Suspended
- (DL) On assignment to D-League affiliate
- Injured

Roster
Updated: April 9, 2010

== Pre-season ==
2009 pre-season game log
October: 5–2 (home: 2–1; road: 3–1)

Game	Date	Team	Score	High points	High rebounds	High assists	Location Attendance	Record
1	October 2	@Indiana Pacers	104–95				11,255 (Indianapolis, USA)	1–0 recap
2	October 6	Utah Jazz	102–101				18,689 (London, UK)	2–0 recap
3	October 10	Milwaukee Bucks	86–98				5,642 (Milwaukee, USA)	2–1 recap
4	October 13	@Milwaukee Bucks	87–86				18,119 (Chicago, USA)	3–1 recap
5	October 14	Minnesota Timberwolves	99–94				11,955 (Minneapolis, USA)	4–1 recap
6	October 19	@Orlando Magic	98–101				20,688 (Chicago, USA)	4–2 recap
7	October 23	@Washington Wizards	93–70				20,981 (Chicago, USA)	5–2 recap

2009–10 pre-season schedule

== Regular season ==
=== Standings ===
Central Division	W	L	PCT	GB	Home	Road	Div
z-Cleveland Cavaliers	61	21	.744	–	35–6	26–15	12–4
x-Milwaukee Bucks	46	36	.561	15	28–13	18–23	10–6
x-Chicago Bulls	41	41	.500	20	24–17	17–24	10–6
Indiana Pacers	32	50	.390	29	23–18	9–32	6–10
Detroit Pistons	27	55	.329	34	17–24	10–31	2–14

#	Eastern Conference				
#	Team	W	L	PCT	GB
1	z-Cleveland Cavaliers	61	21	.744	–
2	y-Orlando Magic	59	23	.720	2
3	x-Atlanta Hawks	53	29	.646	8
4	y-Boston Celtics	50	32	.610	11
5	x-Miami Heat	47	35	.573	14
6	x-Milwaukee Bucks	46	36	.561	15
7	x-Charlotte Bobcats	44	38	.537	17
8	x-Chicago Bulls	41	41	.500	20
9	Toronto Raptors	40	42	.488	21
10	Indiana Pacers	32	50	.390	29
11	New York Knicks	29	53	.354	32
12	Philadelphia 76ers	27	55	.329	34
13	Detroit Pistons	27	55	.329	34
14	Washington Wizards	26	56	.317	35
15	New Jersey Nets	12	70	.146	49

=== Game log ===
2009–10 game log
Total: 41–41 (home: 24–17; road: 17–24)
October: 1–1 (home: 1–0; road: 0–1)

Game	Date	Team	Score	High points	High rebounds	High assists	Location Attendance	Record
1	October 29	San Antonio	W 92–85	Luol Deng (17)	Joakim Noah (10)	Derrick Rose (10)	United Center; 21,412	1–0
2	October 30	@ Boston	L 90–118	Joakim Noah (16)	Joakim Noah (10)	Kirk Hinrich (7)	TD Garden; 18,624	1–1

November: 5–8 (home: 3–1; road: 2–7)

Game	Date	Team	Score	High points	High rebounds	High assists	Location Attendance	Record
3	November 1	@ Miami	L 87–95	Luol Deng (26)	Luol Deng (8)	Derrick Rose (5)	American Airlines Arena; 15,865	1–2
4	November 3	Milwaukee	W 83–81	Luol Deng (24)	Luol Deng (20)	Derrick Rose (5)	United Center; 19,789	2–2
5	November 5	@ Cleveland	W 86–85	Luol Deng (15)	Joakim Noah (11)	Derrick Rose (11)	Quicken Loans Arena; 20,562	3–2
6	November 7	Charlotte	W 93–90	John Salmons (27)	Joakim Noah (16)	Kirk Hinrich (7)	United Center; 21,108	4–2
7	November 10	Denver	L 89–90	Derrick Rose (22)	Joakim Noah (21)	Luol Deng, John Salmons, Derrick Rose (7)	United Center; 21,409	4–3
8	November 11	@ Toronto	L 88–99	Luol Deng, Taj Gibson (18)	Joakim Noah (11)	Derrick Rose (6)	Air Canada Centre; 16,310	4–4
9	November 14	Philadelphia	W 94–88	Luol Deng, Kirk Hinrich (19)	Joakim Noah (12)	Kirk Hinrich (7)	United Center; 21,837	5–4
10	November 17	@ Sacramento	W 101–87	John Salmons (23)	Joakim Noah (14)	Derrick Rose (7)	ARCO Arena; 12,634	6–4
11	November 19	@ Los Angeles	L 93–108	Derrick Rose (20)	Joakim Noah (15)	Derrick Rose (6)	Staples Center; 18,997	6–5
12	November 21	@ Denver	L 93–108	Derrick Rose (28)	Taj Gibson (12)	Kirk Hinrich (5)	Pepsi Center; 15,823	6–6
13	November 23	@ Portland	L 98–122	Luol Deng (25)	Joakim Noah (8)	Derrick Rose (5)	Rose Garden; 20,383	6–7
14	November 26	@ Utah	L 86–105	Luol Deng (25)	Joakim Noah (9)	John Salmons (5)	EnergySolutions Arena; 19,911	6–8
15	November 30	@ Milwaukee	L 97–99	John Salmons (23)	Joakim Noah (17)	Derrick Rose (7)	Bradley Center; 13,684	6–9

December: 7–8 (home: 6–5; road: 1–3)

Game	Date	Team	Score	High points	High rebounds	High assists	Location Attendance	Record
16	December 2	Detroit	W 92–85	John Salmons (22)	Joakim Noah (14)	Derrick Rose, Brad Miller (6)	United Center; 21,523	7–9
17	December 4	@ Cleveland	L 87–101	Taj Gibson (14)	Taj Gibson (13)	Derrick Rose (7)	Quicken Loans Arena; 20,562	7–10
18	December 5	Toronto	L 78–110	John Salmons, Jannero Pargo (13)	Joakim Noah (7)	Derrick Rose (5)	United Center; 20,481	7–11
19	December 8	New Jersey	L 101–103	Luol Deng, Derrick Rose (27)	Luol Deng, Joakim Noah (9)	Derrick Rose (10)	United Center; 17,872	7–12
20	December 9	@ Atlanta	L 83–118	Derrick Rose (19)	Joakim Noah (11)	Derrick Rose (7)	Philips Arena; 16,808	7–13
21	December 11	Golden State	W 96–91 (OT)	Luol Deng (21)	Joakim Noah (14)	Luol Deng (6)	United Center; 18,803	8–13
22	December 12	Boston	L 80–106	Derrick Rose (19)	Joakim Noah (13)	John Salmons (9)	United Center; 21,257	8–14
23	December 15	L.A. Lakers	L 87–96	Luol Deng, Derrick Rose (21)	Joakim Noah (20)	Derrick Rose, Brad Miller (6)	United Center; 21,416	8–15
24	December 17	New York	W 98–89	Luol Deng (24)	Luol Deng (13)	Derrick Rose (6)	United Center; 19,791	9–15
25	December 19	Atlanta	W 101–98 (OT)	Derrick Rose (32)	Luol Deng (12)	Derrick Rose, Luol Deng (6)	United Center; 21,381	10–15
26	December 21	Sacramento	L 98–102	Luol Deng (26)	Joakim Noah (10)	Derrick Rose (7)	United Center; 19,631	10–16
27	December 22	@ New York	L 81–88	Derrick Rose (26)	Joakim Noah (21)	Derrick Rose (4)	Madison Square Garden; 19,763	10–17
28	December 26	New Orleans	W 96–85	Tyrus Thomas (21)	Joakim Noah (18)	Derrick Rose (9)	United Center; 22,008	11–17
29	December 29	Indiana	W 104–95	Derrick Rose (28)	Tyrus Thomas (15)	Derrick Rose (6)	United Center; 21,887	12–17
30	December 31	@ Detroit	W 98–97	Derrick Rose (22)	Joakim Noah (21)	Kirk Hinrich (6)	The Palace of Auburn Hills; 22,076	13–17

January: 10–5 (home: 4–1; road: 6–4)

Game	Date	Team	Score	High points	High rebounds	High assists	Location Attendance	Record
31	January 2	Orlando	W 101–93	Derrick Rose (30)	Taj Gibson (12)	Derrick Rose (7)	United Center; 21,162	14–17
32	January 4	Oklahoma	L 85–98	Derrick Rose (19)	Joakim Noah (14)	Derrick Rose, Kirk Hinrich (7)	United Center; 18,838	14–18
33	January 5	@ Charlotte	L 108–113	Derrick Rose (24)	Luol Deng (9)	Derrick Rose (9)	Time Warner Cable Arena; 13,749	14–19
34	January 8	@ Milawaukee	L 93–96	Derrick Rose (25)	Joakim Noah (18)	Derrick Rose (9)	Bradley Center; 18,717	14–20
35	January 9	Minnesota	W 110–96	Joakim Noah, Kirk Hinrich (20)	Joakim Noah, Taj Gibson (9)	Derrick Rose, Kirk Hinrich (7)	United Center; 20,255	15–20
36	January 11	Detroit	W 120–87	Luol Deng (27)	Joakim Noah (11)	Derrick Rose (9)	United Center; 21,014	16–20
37	January 14	@ Boston	W 96–83	Luol Deng (25)	Joakim Noah (11)	Kirk Hinrich (6)	TD Garden; 18,624	17–20
38	January 15	Washington	W 121–119 (2OT)	Derrick Rose (37)	Joakim Noah (15)	Derrick Rose (6)	United Center; 20,304	18–20
39	January 18	@ Golden State	L 97–114	John Salmons (37)	Joakim Noah (16)	Derrick Rose, John Salmons, Jannero Pargo (4)	Oracle Arena; 19,208	18–21
40	January 20	@ L.A. Clippers	L 97–104	Derrick Rose (23)	Joakim Noah (15)	Derrick Rose (7)	Staples Center; 16,794	18–22
41	January 22	@ Phoenix	W 115–104	Derrick Rose (32)	Joakim Noah, Taj Gibson (8)	Derrick Rose, Kirk Hinrich (5)	US Airways Center; 18422	19–22
42	January 23	@ Houston	W 104–97	Brad Miller (25)	Taj Gibson (14)	Kirk Hinrich (7)	Toyota Center; 18,119	20–22
43	January 25	@ San Antonio	W 98–95	Derrick Rose (27)	Luol Deng (9)	Derrick Rose (6)	AT&T Center; 18,581	21–22
44	January 27	@ Oklahoma	W 96–86	Derrick Rose (26)	Taj Gibson (15)	Derrick Rose (7)	Ford Center; 17,562	22–22
45	January 29	@ New Orleans	W 108–106 (OT)	Luol Deng (26)	Joakim Noah (18)	Kirk Hinrich (6)	New Orleans Arena; 16,578	23–22

February: 8–6 (home: 5–2; road: 3–4)

Game	Date	Team	Score	High points	High rebounds	High assists	Location Attendance	Record
46	February 2	L.A. Clippers	L 82–90	Luol Deng (18)	Tyrus Thomas (9)	Derrick Rose (4)	United Center; 19,335	23–23
47	February 3	@ Philadelphia	L 103–106	Derrick Rose (30)	Luol Deng (11)	Derrick Rose (9)	Wachovia Center; 13,295	23–24
48	February 5	@ Atlanta	L 81–91	Luol Deng (20)	Kirk Hinrich (9)	Derrick Rose (6)	Philips Arena; 18,729	23–25
49	February 6	Miami	W 95–91	Luol Deng (25)	Brad Miller (8)	John Salmons (5)	United Center; 22,352	24–25
50	February 9	@ Indiana	W 109–101	Luol Deng (23)	Luol Deng (11)	Derrick Rose (7)	Conseco Fieldhouse; 12,945	25–25
51	February 10	Orlando	L 87–107	Luol Deng (23)	Luol Deng (7)	Kirk Hinrich, Tyrus Thomas (4)	United Center; 21,566	25–26
52	February 16	New York	W 118–85	Derrick Rose (29)	Taj Gibson (10)	Kirk Hinrich, Derrick Rose, John Salmons (6)	United Center; 20,989	26–26
53	February 17	@ New York	W 115–109	Derrick Rose (27)	Taj Gibson (16)	Derrick Rose (6)	Madison Square Garden; 19,763	27–26
54	February 19	@ Minnesota	W 100–94	Kirk Hinrich (20)	Brad Miller (10)	Kirk Hinrich, Derrick Rose (5)	Target Center; 18,183	28–26
55	February 20	Philadelphia	W 122–90	Taj Gibson (20)	Taj Gibson (13)	Derrick Rose (6)	United Center; 22,147	29–26
56	February 22	@ Washington	L 95–101	Derrick Rose (22)	Taj Gibson (8)	Derrick Rose (6)	Verizon Center; 14,113	29–27
57	February 24	Indiana	W 120–110	Luol Deng (31)	Taj Gibson (11)	Derrick Rose (8)	United Center; 20,363	30–27
58	February 26	Portland	W 115–111 (OT)	Derrick Rose (33)	Joakim Noah (11)	Derrick Rose, Kirk Hinrich, Joakim Noah (4)	United Center; 21,508	31–27
59	February 27	@ Indiana	L 90–100	Derrick Rose (27)	Luol Deng (18)	Derrick Rose (4)	Conseco Fieldhouse; 18,165	31–28

March: 4–11 (home: 2–7; road: 2–4)

Game	Date	Team	Score	High points	High rebounds	High assists	Location Attendance	Record
60	March 1	Atlanta	L 92–116	Derrick Rose (24)	Taj Gibson (13)	Kirk Hinrich (6)	United Center; 19,011	31–29
61	March 4	Memphis	L 96–105	Luol Deng (23)	Brad Miller (7)	Kirk Hinrich (4)	United Center; 19,187	31–30
62	March 6	Dallas	L 116–122	Derrick Rose (34)	Taj Gibson (11)	Derrick Rose (8)	United Center; 21,737	31-31
63	March 9	Utah	L 108–132	Derrick Rose (25)	Kirk Hinrich, Hakim Warrick (5)	Derrick Rose (13)	United Center; 18,451	31–32
64	March 11	@ Orlando	L 82–111	James Johnson (13)	Taj Gibson (9)	Kirk Hinrich (6)	Amway Arena; 17,461	31–33
65	March 12	@ Miami	L 95–108	James Johnson, Jannero Pargo (20)	Brad Miller (11)	Kirk Hinrich (6)	AmericanAirlines Arena; 19,600	31–34
66	March 16	@ Memphis	L 97–104	Ronald Murray (25)	Brad Miller (11)	Jannero Pargo (8)	FedEx Forum; 15,413	31–35
67	March 17	@ Dallas	L 106–113	Acie Law (22)	Chris Richard (9)	Brad Miller, Jannero Pargo (4)	American Airlines Center; 20,406	31–36
68	March 19	Cleveland	L 85–92	Taj Gibson (20)	Taj Gibson (13)	Kirk Hinrich (11)	United Center; 23,129	31–37
69	March 20	@ Philadelphia	W 98–84	Derrick Rose (23)	Taj Gibson (7)	Kirk Hinrich (11)	Wachovia Center; 16,098	32–37
70	March 22	Houston	W 98–88	Derrick Rose (27)	Brad Miller, Taj Gibson (12)	Derrick Rose (8)	United Center; 19,834	33–37
71	March 25	Miami	L 74–103	Hakim Warrick (14)	Taj Gibson (10)	Derrick Rose (5)	United Center; 21,592	33–38
72	March 27	New Jersey	W 106–83	Jannero Pargo (27)	Taj Gibson (13)	Derrick Rose (9)	United Center; 20,592	34–38
73	March 28	@ Detroit	W 110–103	Ronald Murray (23)	Taj Gibson (10)	Derrick Rose (9)	Palace of Auburn Hills; 22,076	35–38
74	March 30	Phoenix	L 105–111	Ronald Murray, Derrick Rose (23)	Joakim Noah, Taj Gibson (10)	Derrick Rose (10)	United Center; 21,169	35–39

April: 6–2 (home: 3–1; road: 3–1)

Game	Date	Team	Score	High points	High rebounds	High assists	Location Attendance	Record
75	April 2	@ Washington	W 95–87	Derrick Rose (24)	Taj Gibson (16)	Derrick Rose, Kirk Hinrich (5)	Verizon Center; 18,002	36–39
76	April 3	Charlotte	W 96–88	Derrick Rose (26)	Joakim Noah (16)	Brad Miller (5)	United Center; 20,996	37–39
77	April 6	Milwaukee	L 74–79	Luol Deng (16)	Joakim Noah (11)	Derrick Rose (11)	United Center; 20,268	37–40
78	April 8	Cleveland	W 109–108	Derrick Rose (24)	Joakim Noah (15)	Derrick Rose (10)	United Center; 21,707	38–40
79	April 9	@ New Jersey	L 116–127	Brad Miller (27)	Brad Miller (10)	Kirk Hinrich (9)	Izod Center; 15,909	38–41
80	April 11	@ Toronto	W 104–88	Derrick Rose (26)	Joakim Noah (19)	Derrick Rose, Joakim Noah (7)	Air Canada Centre; 19,515	39–41
81	April 13	Boston	W 101–93	Derrick Rose (39)	Joakim Noah (16)	Derrick Rose (7)	United Center; 20,649	40–41
82	April 14	@ Charlotte	W 98–89	Derrick Rose (27)	Joakim Noah, Taj Gibson (13)	Derrick Rose (5)	Time Warner Cable Arena; 17,439	41-41

2009–10 season schedule

== Playoffs ==
The Bulls managed to clinch the 8th seed in the Eastern Conference over the Toronto Raptors near the final day of the regular season. This marked the fifth time in six years Chicago has made the playoffs. With the lowest seed they faced the number one ranked Cleveland Cavaliers. Poised to win a championship LeBron James and the Cavs defeated the Bulls 4 games to 1 with the over-matched Bulls making a valiant effort in game 5, losing 96–94.

=== Game log ===
2010 playoff game log
Total: 1–4 (home: 1–1; road: 0–3)
First Round: 1–4 (home: 1–1; road: 0–3)

Game	Date	Team	Score	High points	High rebounds	High assists	Location Attendance	Series
1	April 17	@ Cleveland	L 83–96	Derrick Rose (28)	Kirk Hinrich, Joakim Noah (8)	Derrick Rose (10)	Quicken Loans Arena; 20,562	0–1
2	April 19	@ Cleveland	L 102–112	Joakim Noah (25)	Joakim Noah (13)	Derrick Rose (8)	Quicken Loans Arena; 20,562	0–2
3	April 22	Cleveland	W 108–106	Derrick Rose (31)	Joakim Noah (15)	Derrick Rose (7)	United Center; 22,991	1–2
4	April 25	Cleveland	L 98–121	Joakim Noah, Derrick Rose (21)	Joakim Noah (20)	Derrick Rose (5)	United Center; 22,991	1–3
5	April 27	@ Cleveland	L 94–96	Derrick Rose (31)	Taj Gibson (11)	Derrick Rose (6)	Quicken Loans Arena; 20,562	1–4

2010 playoff schedule

== Player statistics ==
Legend
GP	Games played	GS	Games started	MPG	Minutes per game
FG%	Field-goal percentage	3P%	3-point field-goal percentage	FT%	Free-throw percentage
RPG	Rebounds per game	APG	Assists per game	SPG	Steals per game
BPG	Blocks per game	PPG	Points per game

=== Season ===
Player	GP	GS	MPG	FG%	3P%	FT%	RPG	APG	SPG	BPG	PPG
Joe Alexander^{1}	8	0	3.6	.167	.000	.667	.6	.3	.1	.1	.5
Devin Brown^{1}	11	0	8.5	.222	.235	.000	1.4	.6	.3	.1	1.8
Luol Deng	70	69	37.9	.466	.386	.764	7.3	2.0	.9	.9	17.6
Taj Gibson	82	70	26.9	.494	0.0	.646	7.5	0.9	0.6	1.3	9.0
Kirk Hinrich	74	53	33.5	.409	.371	.752	3.5	4.5	1.2	.3	10.9
James Johnson	65	11	11.6	.452	.326	.729	2.0	.7	.3	.7	3.9
Acie Law^{1}	12	1	11.3	.467	.333	.741	1.2	1.3	.3	.0	5.5
Brad Miller	82	37	23.8	.430	.280	.827	4.9	1.9	.5	.4	8.8
Ronald Murray^{1}	29	1	23.4	.397	.311	.762	2.9	1.8	.6	.1	10.1
Joakim Noah	64	54	30.1	.504	.000	.744	11.0	2.1	.5	1.6	10.7
Jannero Pargo	63	5	13.2	.346	.275	.933	1.2	1.4	.5	.0	5.5
Chris Richard	18	0	12.4	.517	.000	.636	3.3	.4	.4	.2	2.1
Derrick Rose	78	78	36.8	.489	.267	.766	3.8	6.0	.7	.4	20.8
Hakim Warrick^{1}	28	0	19.0	.483	.000	.755	3.6	.6	.2	.3	8.7

^{1}Stats with the Bulls.

=== Playoffs ===
Player	GP	GS	MPG	FG%	3P%	FT%	RPG	APG	SPG	BPG	PPG
Joe Alexander	0	0	0	.000	.000	.000	.0	.0	.0	.0	0
Devin Brown	1	0	2.0	1.000	.000	.000	1.0	.0	.0	.0	2.0
Luol Deng	5	5	40.6	.463	.083	.731	5.0	1.4	1.4	.8	18.8
Taj Gibson	5	5	29.0	.421	0.0	.545	7.0	.6	.2	.8	7.6
Kirk Hinrich	5	5	39.2	.423	.500	.714	4.4	4.0	1.4	.0	12.4
James Johnson	4	0	5.0	.000	.000	.000	.3	.3	.0	.0	.0
Acie Law	0	0	0	.000	.000	.000	.0	.0	.0	.0	0
Brad Miller	5	0	18.6	.370	.000	1.000	3.6	.8	.0	.0	5.4
Ronald Murray	5	0	19.4	.405	.333	1.000	2.6	2.0	.4	.0	8.4
Joakim Noah	5	5	36.6	.528	.000	.947	13.0	2.6	1.4	1.4	14.8
Jannero Pargo	2	0	4.0	.200	.500	.000	.0	.5	.0	.0	1.5
Chris Richard	2	0	2.5	.000	.000	.000	1.5	.0	.0	.0	.0
Derrick Rose	5	5	42.4	.456	.333	.818	3.4	7.2	.8	.0	26.8
Hakim Warrick	3	0	10.3	.182	.000	.833	1.7	.0	.0	.0	3.0

== Awards, records and milestones ==
=== Awards ===
==== Week/Month ====
- Joakim Noah was named the Bulls CDW/HP Solutions Player of the Month for November.
- Derrick Rose was named Eastern Conference Player of the Week for the week of December 28.
- Derrick Rose was named Eastern Conference Player of the Month for April. During this month, he averaged 25.4 points, 4.1 rebounds and 7 assists.

==== All-Star ====
- Derrick Rose selected to Eastern Conference All-Star Team as a reserve.

==== Season ====
- Taj Gibson was named to the NBA All-Rookie First Team.

=== Milestones ===
First team to win five consecutive games over opponents over .500 on the road

== Injuries and surgeries ==
- On September 29, Aaron Gray suffered a stress fracture of his left fibula. This was determined after he developed a lower leg pain the week of September 26 and he was projected to miss six-eight weeks. On November 16, Gray, still out because of the stress fracture, was admitted to the hospital because of fluid build-up in his right knee. Gray returned to the line-up to make his season début November 26 against the Utah Jazz.
- On November 6, Tyrus Thomas fractured his left radius during a weight training session. He underwent surgery on November 7 and is projected to miss four to six weeks of the season.
- On November 25, Kirk Hinrich sprained his left thumb during practice. Though initially feared to be a similar injury the previous season where he tore the ligaments of his right thumb, an MRI and subsequent examinations confirmed it to only be a sprain and he will only miss one to two weeks.

== Transactions ==
Chicago Bulls	Players Added Via Draft: James Johnson; Taj Gibson; Via Free Agency: Jannero Pargo (From Greece); Lindsey Hunter (From Re-signed); Via Trade: Joe Alexander (From Bucks); Hakim Warrick (From Bucks)	Players Lost Via Free Agency: Ben Gordon (To Pistons); Waived: Anthony Roberson; Via Buyout: Tim Thomas; Via Trade: John Salmons (To Bucks)

== See also ==
- 2009–10 NBA season
