= 2009–10 Milwaukee Bucks season =

NBA professional basketball team season

- Head coach: Scott Skiles
- General manager: John Hammond
- Owners: Herb Kohl
- Arena: Bradley Center

Results
- Record: 46–36 (.561)
- Place: Division: 2nd (Central); Conference: 6th (Eastern)
- Playoff finish: First Round (lost to Hawks 3–4)
- Stats at Basketball Reference

Local media
- Television: Fox Sports North
- Radio: WTMJ

The 2009–10 Milwaukee Bucks season was the 42nd season of the franchise in the National Basketball Association (NBA).

The Bucks made the playoffs for the first time in four seasons, though they would lose in the first round to the Atlanta Hawks in seven games after three games to two lead they lost the final two games of the playoff series. It was during this season in which the slogan "Fear the Deer" was coined, which the fans adopted on the Internet. Five years after it was introduced, the Bucks used the slogan as part of their new jersey design and on the sidelines of the court. The team's also used the phrase as their official Twitter hashtag since 2018. The phrase was also engraved onto the Bucks' 2021 NBA Championship rings.

The 46-win total was the most games the Bucks had won since 2001 and the most they would win until 2019.

== Key dates ==
- June 25 – The 2009 NBA draft took place in New York City.
- July 8 – The free agency period started.

== Draft picks ==
Round	Pick	Player	Position	Nationality	College/Team
1	10	Brandon Jennings	PG	United States	Lottomatica Roma (Italy)
2	41	Jodie Meeks	SG	United States	Kentucky (Jr.)

== Roster ==
2009–10 Milwaukee Bucks roster
Players

Pos.	No.	Player	Height	Weight	DOB	From
G	42	Charlie Bell	6 ft 3 in (1.91 m)	200 lb (91 kg)	1979–03–12	Michigan State
C	6	Andrew Bogut (injured) (IN)	7 ft 0 in (2.13 m)	260 lb (118 kg)	1984–11–28	Utah
C	9	Primož Brezec	7 ft 1 in (2.16 m)	255 lb (116 kg)	1979–10–02	Slovenia
G/F	10	Carlos Delfino	6 ft 6 in (1.98 m)	230 lb (104 kg)	1982–08–29	Argentina
C	50	Dan Gadzuric	6 ft 11 in (2.11 m)	245 lb (111 kg)	1978–02–02	UCLA
F	7	Ersan İlyasova	6 ft 10 in (2.08 m)	235 lb (107 kg)	1987–05–15	Turkey
G	11	Royal Ivey	6 ft 4 in (1.93 m)	215 lb (98 kg)	1981–12–20	Texas
F	00	Darnell Jackson (IN)	6 ft 9 in (2.06 m)	235 lb (107 kg)	1985–11–07	Kansas
G	3	Brandon Jennings	6 ft 1 in (1.85 m)	169 lb (77 kg)	1989–09–23	Oak Hill Academy
F	12	Luc Mbah a Moute	6 ft 8 in (2.03 m)	230 lb (104 kg)	1986–09–09	UCLA
G	22	Michael Redd (injured) (IN)	6 ft 6 in (1.98 m)	215 lb (98 kg)	1979–08–24	Ohio State
G	13	Luke Ridnour	6 ft 2 in (1.88 m)	175 lb (79 kg)	1981–02–13	Oregon
G/F	15	John Salmons	6 ft 6 in (1.98 m)	207 lb (94 kg)	1979–12–12	Miami (FL)
G/F	24	Jerry Stackhouse	6 ft 6 in (1.98 m)	218 lb (99 kg)	1975–11–05	North Carolina
C	40	Kurt Thomas	6 ft 9 in (2.06 m)	230 lb (104 kg)	1972–10–04	TCU

Coaches
Head coach
- Scott Skiles
Assistant(s)
- Jim Boylan
- Bill Peterson
- Kelvin Sampson
- Joe Wolf
- Adrian Griffin

Legend
- (DP) Unsigned draft pick
- (FA) Free agent
- (S) Suspended
- Injured

== Regular season ==
=== Standings ===
Central Division	W	L	PCT	GB	Home	Road	Div
z-Cleveland Cavaliers	61	21	.744	–	35–6	26–15	12–4
x-Milwaukee Bucks	46	36	.561	15	28–13	18–23	10–6
x-Chicago Bulls	41	41	.500	20	24–17	17–24	10–6
Indiana Pacers	32	50	.390	29	23–18	9–32	6–10
Detroit Pistons	27	55	.329	34	17–24	10–31	2–14

#	Eastern Conference				
#	Team	W	L	PCT	GB
1	z-Cleveland Cavaliers	61	21	.744	–
2	y-Orlando Magic	59	23	.720	2
3	x-Atlanta Hawks	53	29	.646	8
4	y-Boston Celtics	50	32	.610	11
5	x-Miami Heat	47	35	.573	14
6	x-Milwaukee Bucks	46	36	.561	15
7	x-Charlotte Bobcats	44	38	.537	17
8	x-Chicago Bulls	41	41	.500	20
9	Toronto Raptors	40	42	.488	21
10	Indiana Pacers	32	50	.390	29
11	New York Knicks	29	53	.354	32
12	Philadelphia 76ers	27	55	.329	34
13	Detroit Pistons	27	55	.329	34
14	Washington Wizards	26	56	.317	35
15	New Jersey Nets	12	70	.146	49

=== Game log ===
2009–10 game log
Total: 46–36 (home: 28–13; road: 18–23)
October: 1–1 (home: 1–0; road: 0–1)

Game	Date	Team	Score	High points	High rebounds	High assists	Location Attendance	Record
1	October 30	Philadelphia	L 86–99	Brandon Jennings, Michael Redd (17)	Brandon Jennings (9)	Brandon Jennings (9)	Wachovia Center; 14,638	0–1
2	October 31	@ Detroit	W 96–85	Brandon Jennings (24)	Luc Richard Mbah a Moute, Andrew Bogut (8)	Hakim Warrick, Charlie Bell, Brandon Jennings, Michael Redd (3)	Bradley Center; 15,095	1–1

November: 8–5 (home: 6–1; road: 2–4)

Game	Date	Team	Score	High points	High rebounds	High assists	Location Attendance	Record
3	November 3	@ Chicago	L 81–83	Brandon Jennings (25)	Andrew Bogut (13)	Carlos Delfino, Brandon Jennings (4)	United Center; 19,789	1–2
4	November 6	@ Minnesota	W 87–72	Andrew Bogut (17)	Andrew Bogut (10)	Charlie Bell (5)	Target Center; 13,758	2–2
5	November 7	New York	W 102–87	Andrew Bogut (22)	Ersan İlyasova (13)	Andrew Bogut, Ersan İlyasova, Luke Ridnour (4)	Bradley Center; 15,486	3–2
6	November 11	Denver	W 108–102	Brandon Jennings (32)	Andrew Bogut (10)	Charlie Bell (5)	Bradley Center; 12,987	4–2
7	November 14	Golden State	W 129–125	Brandon Jennings (55)	Luc Richard Mbah a Moute (12)	Charlie Bell (6)	Bradley Center; 14,978	5–2
8	November 16	Dallas	L 113–115 (OT)	Brandon Jennings (25)	Ersan İlyasova (12)	Luke Ridnour (12)	Bradley Center; 13,683	5–3
9	November 18	New Jersey	W 99–85	Carlos Delfino, Andrew Bogut (21)	Andrew Bogut (11)	Brandon Jennings (8)	Bradley Center; 13,479	6–3
10	November 20	Charlotte	W 95–88	Brandon Jennings (29)	Hakim Warrick (9)	Brandon Jennings (7)	Bradley Center; 15,578	7–3
11	November 21	@ Memphis	W 103–98	Brandon Jennings (26)	Ersan İlyasova (12)	Luke Ridnour (12)	FedEx Forum; 11,209	8–3
12	November 23	@ San Antonio	L 98–112	Ersan İlyasova (20)	Kurt Thomas (5)	Brandon Jennings (7)	AT&T Center; 17,677	8–4
13	November 25	@ New Orleans	L 99–102 (OT)	Luke Ridnour (23)	Hakim Warrick (10)	Luke Ridnour (10)	New Orleans Arena; 14,315	8–5
14	November 27	@ Oklahoma City	L 90–108	Hakim Warrick, Carlos Delfino (15)	Ersan İlyasova (12)	Luke Ridnour (4)	Ford Center; 18,203	8–6
15	November 28	Orlando	L 98–100	Luke Ridnour, Ersan İlyasova (20)	Ersan İlyasova (16)	Luke Ridnour (6)	Bradley Center; 16,128	8–7
16	November 30	Chicago	W 99–97	Andrew Bogut (22)	Andrew Bogut (15)	Brandon Jennings (8)	Bradley Center; 13,684	9–7

December: 3–11 (home: 2–5; road: 1–6)

Game	Date	Team	Score	High points	High rebounds	High assists	Location Attendance	Record
17	December 2	@ Washington	L 102–104	Luke Ridnour, Hakim Warrick (20)	Carlos Delfino (8)	Brandon Jennings (7)	Verizon Center; 12,272	9–8
18	December 4	@ Detroit	L 96–105	Luke Ridnour (21)	Carlos Delfino (7)	Luke Ridnour (9)	The Palace of Auburn Hills; 16,557	9-9
19	December 6	Cleveland	L 86–101	Brandon Jennings (24)	Hakim Warrick, Ersan İlyasova (9)	Brandon Jennings (4)	Bradley Center; 16,625	9–10
20	December 8	@ Boston	L 89–98	Andrew Bogut (25)	Andrew Bogut (14)	Andrew Bogut, Carlos Delfino (5)	TD Garden; 18,624	9–11
21	December 9	Toronto	W 117–95	Brandon Jennings (22)	Ersan İlyasova (9)	Brandon Jennings, Luke Ridnour (7)	Bradley Center; 12,637	10–11
22	December 12	Portland	W 108–101 (2OT)	Andrew Bogut (27)	Andrew Bogut (9)	Brandon Jennings (11)	Bradley Center; 15,973	11-11
23	December 16	LA Lakers	L 106–107 (OT)	Michael Redd (25)	Andrew Bogut (12)	Brandon Jennings (7)	Bradley Center; 16,309	11–12
24	December 18	@ Cleveland	L 82–85	Ersan İlyasova, Brandon Jennings (18)	Andrew Bogut (8)	Brandon Jennings (8)	Quicken Loans Arena; 20,562	11–13
25	December 19	Sacramento	L 95–96	Carlos Delfino (17)	Andrew Bogut (13)	Brandon Jennings (9)	Bradley Center; 13,745	11–14
26	December 21	@ Indiana	W 84–81	Andrew Bogut (31)	Andrew Bogut (18)	Brandon Jennings (6)	Conseco Fieldhouse; 12,836	12–14
27	December 23	Washington	L 97–109	Michael Redd (32)	Andrew Bogut (9)	Michael Redd, Luc Richard Mbah a Moute, Carlos Delfino, Jodie Meeks (3)	Bradley Center; 13,113	12–15
28	December 26	San Antonio	L 97–112	Hakim Warrick (23)	Andrew Bogut (8)	Brandon Jennings (8)	Bradley Center; 14,864	12–16
29	December 28	@ Charlotte	L 84–94	Brandon Jennings (24)	Luc Richard Mbah a Moute (10)	Brandon Jennings (7)	Time Warner Cable Arena; 15,473	12–17
30	December 30	@ Orlando	L 92–117	Brandon Jennings (20)	Andrew Bogut (10)	Brandon Jennings (4)	Amway Arena; 17,461	12–18

January: 8–7 (home: 6–0; road: 2–7)

Game	Date	Team	Score	High points	High rebounds	High assists	Location Attendance	Record
31	January 2	Oklahoma City	W 103–97 (OT)	Michael Redd (27)	Andrew Bogut (15)	Brandon Jennings (5)	Bradley Center; 15,264	13–18
32	January 5	@ New Jersey	W 98–76	Andrew Bogut (18)	Luc Richard Mbah a Moute, Kurt Thomas (9)	Luke Ridnour (5)	IZOD Center; 11,101	14–18
33	January 8	Chicago	W 96–93 L 84–94	Andrew Bogut (27)	Andrew Bogut (13)	Brandon Jennings (8)	Bradley Center; 18,717	15–18
34	January 10	@ LA Lakers	L 77–95	Hakim Warrick (14)	Andrew Bogut (11)	Luke Ridnour (6)	Staples Center; 18,997	15–19
35	January 11	@ Phoenix	L 101–105	Hakim Warrick (21)	Andrew Bogut (13)	Brandon Jennings (8)	US Airways Center; 15,116	15–20
36	January 13	@ Portland	L 108–120	Ersan İlyasova (24)	Andrew Bogut (11)	Luke Ridnour (8)	Rose Garden; 20,465	15–21
37	January 15	@ Golden State	W 113–104	Brandon Jennings (25)	Andrew Bogut (16)	Luke Ridnour (8)	Oracle Arena; 17,455	16–21
38	January 16	@ Utah	L 95–112	Carlos Delfino (28)	Ersan İlyasova, Andrew Bogut (11)	Brandon Jennings (11)	EnergySolutions Arena; 19,669	16–22
39	January 18	@ Houston	L 98–101 (OT)	Brandon Jennings (25)	Andrew Bogut (17)	Brandon Jennings (7)	Toyota Center; 17,187	16–23
40	January 20	Toronto	W 113–107	Andrew Bogut (27)	Andrew Bogut (12)	Brandon Jennings (6)	Bradley Center; 12,724	17–23
41	January 22	@ Toronto	L 96–101	Luke Ridnour (27)	Carlos Delfino (11)	Luke Ridnour (4)	Air Canada Centre; 17,819	17–24
42	January 23	Minnesota	W 127–94	Carlos Delfino (24)	Carlos Delfino (8), Ersan İlyasova (8)	Brandon Jennings (13)	Bradley Center; 17,742	18–24
43	January 26	@ Dallas	L 107–108	Andrew Bogut (32)	Andrew Bogut (9)	Brandon Jennings (7)	American Airlines Center; 19,799	18–25
44	January 27	Philadelphia	W 91–88	Brandon Jennings (18), Charlie Bell (18)	Andrew Bogut (9)	Brandon Jennings (7)	Bradley Center; 12,685	19–25
45	January 30	Miami	W 95–84	Hakim Warrick (22)	Andrew Bogut (15)	Andrew Bogut (5)	Bradley Center; 18,717	20–25

February: 10–4 (home: 3–2; road: 7–2)

Game	Date	Team	Score	High points	High rebounds	High assists	Location Attendance	Record
46	February 1	@ Miami	W 97–81	Andrew Bogut (22)	Andrew Bogut (11)	Andrew Bogut (8)	American Airlines Arena; 15,858	21–25
47	February 2	@ Orlando	L 82–99	Luke Ridnour (13), Charlie Bell (13)	Andrew Bogut (10)	Brandon Jennings (4), Luke Ridnour (4)	Amway Arena; 17,461	21–26
48	February 5	@ New York	W 114–107	Ersan İlyasova (25)	Ersan İlyasova (9), Carlos Delfino (9)	Brandon Jennings (8)	Madison Square Garden; 19,274	22–26
49	February 6	Indiana	W 93–81	Andrew Bogut (21)	Luc Mbah a Moute (11)	Brandon Jennings (7)	Bradley Center	23–26
50	February 9	Detroit	L 81–93	Brandon Jennings (18)	Andrew Bogut (18)	Brandon Jennings (5)	Bradley Center; 12,724	23–27
51	February 10	@ New Jersey	W 97–77	Andrew Bogut (22)	Luc Mbah a Moute (12)	Luke Ridnour (8)	Izod Center; 12,724	24–27
52	February 17	Houston	L 99–127	Luc Mbah a Moute (18)	Luc Mbah a Moute (8), Carlos Delfino (8)	Luke Ridnour (6)	Bradley Center; 12,724	24–28
53	February 19	@ Detroit	W 91–85	John Salmons (19)	Andrew Bogut (12), Ersan İlyasova (12)	Carlos Delfino (6)	The Palace of Auburn Hills; 12,724	25–28
54	February 20	Charlotte	W 93–88	Brandon Jennings (19), John Salmons (19)	Andrew Bogut (13)	John Salmons (7)	Bradley Center; 12,724	26–28
55	February 22	@ New York	W 83–67	Andrew Bogut (24)	Andrew Bogut (20)	Brandon Jennings (7)	Madison Square Garden; 12,724	27–28
56	February 24	New Orleans	W 115–95	Andrew Bogut (26)	Andrew Bogut (13)	Luke Ridnour (6)	Bradley Center; 12,724	28-28
57	February 25	@ Indiana	W 112–110	John Salmons (20)	Andrew Bogut (10)	Luke Ridnour (8)	Conseco Fieldhouse; 12,724	29–28
58	February 27	@ Miami	W 94–71	John Salmons (18)	Andrew Bogut (10)	Brandon Jennings (8)	American Airlines Arena; 18,883	30–28
59	February 28	@ Atlanta	L 102–106	John Salmons (32)	Andrew Bogut (9)	Brandon Jennings (5)	Philips Arena; 16,381	30–29

March: 11–4 (home: 8–2; road: 3–2)

Game	Date	Team	Score	High points	High rebounds	High assists	Location Attendance	Record
60	March 3	Washington	W 100–87	John Salmons (22)	Carlos Delfino (11)	Luke Ridnour (6), Ersan İlyasova (6)	Bradley Center; 13,247	31–29
61	March 5	@ Washington	W 102–74	Andrew Bogut (19), Carlos Delfino (19)	Andrew Bogut (10)	Brandon Jennings (9)	Verizon Center; 16,963	32–29
62	March 6	Cleveland	W 92–85	Brandon Jennings (25)	Carlos Delfino (13)	Brandon Jennings (6)	Bradley Center; 18,717	33–29
63	March 9	Boston	W 86–84	Andrew Bogut (25)	Andrew Bogut (17)	Brandon Jennings (4), John Salmons (4)	Bradley Center; 14,316	34–29
64	March 12	Utah	W 95–87	John Salmons (24)	Andrew Bogut (12)	Carlos Delfino (8)	Bradley Center; 14,917	35–29
65	March 14	Indiana	W 98–94	Jerry Stackhouse (20)	Andrew Bogut (11)	Brandon Jennings (8)	Bradley Center; 15,107	36–29
66	March 17	@ LA Clippers	L 93–101	Brandon Jennings (21)	Andrew Bogut (11)	Brandon Jennings (5)	Staples Center; 15,241	36–30
67	March 19	@ Sacramento	W 114–108	Brandon Jennings (35)	Andrew Bogut (11), Ersan İlyasova (11)	Brandon Jennings (8)	ARCO Arena; 12,098	37–30
68	March 20	@ Denver	W 102–97	Carlos Delfino (26)	Ersan İlyasova (10)	Brandon Jennings (4), John Salmons (4)	Pepsi Center; 19,390	38–30
69	March 22	Atlanta	W 98–95	John Salmons (32)	Andrew Bogut (11)	Luke Ridnour (8)	Bradley Center; 14,186	39–30
70	March 24	Philadelphia	L 86–101	Jerry Stackhouse (15)	Ersan İlyasova (11)	Luke Ridnour (4)	Bradley Center; 12,675	39–31
71	March 26	Miami	L 74–87	John Salmons (23)	Luc Richard Mbah a Moute (11)	Brandon Jennings (2), Luc Richard Mbah a Moute (2), Kurt Thomas (2)	Bradley Center; 17,841	39–32
72	March 28	Memphis	W 108–103	Brandon Jennings (29)	Andrew Bogut (11)	Brandon Jennings (8)	Bradley Center; 17,008	40–32
73	March 30	LA Clippers	W 107–89	Ersan İlyasova (20)	Kurt Thomas (9)	Brandon Jennings (6)	Bradley Center; 12,724	41–32
74	March 31	@ Cleveland	L 98–101	John Salmons (28)	Andrew Bogut (12)	Brandon Jennings (11)	Quicken Loans Arena; 12,724	41–33

April: 5–3 (home: 2–2; road: 3–1)

Game	Date	Team	Score	High points	High rebounds	High assists	Location Attendance	Record
75	April 2	@ Charlotte	L 86–87	John Salmons (28)	Andrew Bogut (12)	Brandon Jennings (5)	Time Warner Cable Arena; 12,724	41–34
76	April 3	Phoenix	W 107–98	Brandon Jennings (23)	Carlos Delfino (9)	Luke Ridnour (6)	Bradley Center; 12,724	42–34
77	April 6	@ Chicago	W 79–74	John Salmons (26)	Kurt Thomas (14)	Brandon Jennings (8)	United Center; 12,724	43–34
78	April 7	New Jersey	W 108–89	Devin Harris (25)	Yi Jianlian (8)	Brook Lopez (7)	Bradley Center; 16,037	44–34
79	April 9	@ Philadelphia	W 95–90	Carlos Delfino (23)	Ersan İlyasova, Luc Richard Mbah a Moute (9)	Andrew Bogut (7)	Oracle Arena; 14,217	45–34
80	April 10	Boston	L 90–105	John Salmons (21)	Kurt Thomas (10)	John Salmons (4)	Bradley Center; 18,717	45–35
81	April 12	Atlanta	L 96–104	John Salmons (28)	Kurt Thomas (10)	Brandon Jennings, Luke Ridnour (5)	Bradley Center; 14,186	45–36
82	April 14	@ Boston	W 106–95	Luke Ridnour, Jerry Stackhouse (17)	Dan Gadzuric (9)	Luke Ridnour (8)	TD Banknorth Garden; 18,624	46–36

2009–10 schedule

== Playoffs ==
=== Game log ===
2010 playoff game log
First Round: 3–4 (home: 2–1; road: 1–3)

Game	Date	Team	Score	High points	High rebounds	High assists	Location Attendance	Series
1	April 17	@ Atlanta	L 92–102	Brandon Jennings (34)	Kurt Thomas (9)	Brandon Jennings (3)	Philips Arena; 18,729	0–1
2	April 20	@ Atlanta	L 86–96	John Salmons (21)	Ersan İlyasova (15)	Carlos Delfino, John Salmons (4)	Philips Arena; 18,938	0–2
3	April 24	Atlanta	W 107–89	John Salmons (22)	Kurt Thomas (13)	John Salmons (7)	Bradley Center; 18,717	1–2
4	April 26	Atlanta	W 111–104	Brandon Jennings (23)	Kurt Thomas (9)	Brandon Jennings (6)	Bradley Center; 18,717	2–2
5	April 28	@ Atlanta	W 91–87	Brandon Jennings (25)	Ersan İlyasova (7)	John Salmons (5)	Philips Arena; 19,304	3–2
6	April 30	Atlanta	L 69–83	Carlos Delfino (20)	Kurt Thomas (9)	John Salmons (4)	Bradley Center; 18,717	3–3
7	May 2	@ Atlanta	L 74–95	Brandon Jennings (15)	Ersan İlyasova (11)	Brandon Jennings (5)	Philips Arena; 19,241	3–4

2010 playoff schedule

== Player statistics ==
=== Season ===
Player	GP	GS	MPG	FG%	3FG%	FT%	RPG	APG	SPG	BPG	PPG
Charlie Bell	71	39	22.7	.381	.365	.716	1.9	1.5	.6	.2	6.5
Andrew Bogut	69	69	32.3	.520	.000	.629	10.2	1.8	.6	2.5	15.9
Primož Brezec^{1}	14	0	4.2	.538	.000	.000	.9	.1	.0	.1	1.0
Carlos Delfino	75	66	30.4	.408	.367	.782	5.3	2.7	1.1	.3	11.0
Dan Gadzuric	32	6	9.8	.438	.000	.400	2.9	.4	.3	.4	2.8
Ersan İlyasova	81	31	23.4	.443	.336	.715	6.4	1.0	.6	.3	10.4
Royal Ivey^{1}	18	0	5.0	.321	.182	.600	.4	.6	.5	.0	1.3
Darnell Jackson^{1}	1	0	9.0	.200	.0	.000	2.0	.0	.0	.0	2.0
Brandon Jennings	82	82	32.6	.371	.374	.817	3.4	5.7	1.3	.2	15.5
Luc Mbah a Moute	73	62	25.6	.480	.353	.699	5.5	1.1	.8	.5	6.2
Michael Redd	18	12	27.3	.352	.300	.712	3.0	2.2	1.1	.1	11.9
Luke Ridnour	82	0	21.5	.478	.381	.907	1.7	4.0	0.7	.1	10.4
John Salmons^{1}	30	28	37.6	.467	.385	.867	3.2	3.3	1.1	.1	19.9
Jerry Stackhouse	42	0	20.4	.408	.346	.797	2.4	1.7	.5	.2	8.5
Kurt Thomas	70	9	15.0	.476	.000	.800	4.2	.7	.4	.7	3.0

^{1}Stats with the Bucks.

=== Playoffs ===
Player	GP	GS	MPG	FG%	3FG%	FT%	RPG	APG	SPG	BPG	PPG
Charlie Bell	3	0	2.7	.000	.000	.000	.0	.0	.0	.0	.0
Andrew Bogut	0	0	0	.000	.000	.000	.0	.0	.0	.0	.0
Primož Brezec	4	0	6.3	.571	.000	.500	.8	.0	.2	.0	2.3
Carlos Delfino	7	7	32.3	.356	.405	.750	4.0	2.6	.7	.3	10.0
Dan Gadzuric	7	0	10.9	.529	.000	.250	3.4	.1	.1	.7	2.7
Ersan İlyasova	7	0	22.4	.480	.357	.833	7.6	.4	.7	.1	9.7
Royal Ivey	3	0	3.7	.333	.000	.000	.0	.7	.0	.3	1.3
Darnell Jackson	0	0	0	.000	.000	.000	.0	.0	.0	.0	.0
Brandon Jennings	7	7	35.6	.408	.293	.808	3.0	3.6	1.1	.6	18.7
Luc Mbah a Moute	7	7	25.4	.520	.000	.600	5.6	.7	.3	.0	9.1
Michael Redd	0	0	0	.000	.000	.000	.0	.0	.0	.0	.0
Luke Ridnour	7	0	17.3	.467	.357	.833	1.9	1.9	.6	.1	8.1
John Salmons	7	7	40.7	.404	.174	.964	3.7	4.0	1.4	.6	17.0
Jerry Stackhouse	7	0	20.6	.326	.333	.900	1.7	1.1	.7	.1	7.3
Kurt Thomas	7	7	28.4	.486	.000	.800	7.9	1.6	.4	.6	5.4

== Awards, records and milestones ==
=== All-Star ===
- Brandon Jennings Represented the Bucks in the Skills Challenge in which he came in 3rd, and he participated in the Rookie/Sophomore Challenge as well.

=== Records ===
- Most Points by a Bucks Rookie (55 by Brandon Jennings)

== Injuries and surgeries ==
- Andrew Bogut – Broken right hand
- Michael Redd – Torn ACL

== Transactions ==
=== Trades ===
June 23, 2009
To Milwaukee Bucks----
- Bruce Bowen
- Kurt Thomas
- Fabricio Oberto
To San Antonio Spurs----
- Richard Jefferson
June 23, 2009
To Milwaukee Bucks----
- Amir Johnson
To Detroit Pistons----
- Fabricio Oberto
July 31, 2009
To Milwaukee Bucks----
- Sonny Weems
To Denver Nuggets----
- Malik Allen
August 18, 2009
To Milwaukee Bucks----
- Carlos Delfino (via sign and trade)
- Roko Ukić
To Toronto Raptors----
- Amir Johnson
- Sonny Weems
February 18, 2010
To Milwaukee Bucks----
- John Salmons
- 2011 & 2012 second-round picks and option to switch to 2010 first-round picks
To Chicago Bulls----
- Hakim Warrick
- Joe Alexander
February 18, 2010
To Milwaukee Bucks----
- Royal Ivey
- Primož Brezec
- 2010 second-round draft pick
To Philadelphia 76ers----
- Francisco Elson
- Jodie Meeks

=== Free agents ===
Additions
Player	Date signed	Former team
Ersan İlyasova	July 23, 2009	FC Barcelona Regal
Hakim Warrick	July 31, 2009	Memphis Grizzlies
Jerry Stackhouse	January 18, 2010	Memphis Grizzlies

Subtractions
Player	Date signed	New team
Charlie Villanueva	July 8, 2009	Detroit Pistons
Ramon Sessions	September 14, 2009	Minnesota Timberwolves
Keith Bogans	September 23, 2009	San Antonio Spurs
Salim Stoudamire		Idaho Stampede
Bruce Bowen	N/A	Retired
Roko Ukić		Fenerbahçe Ülker
