= Royal Ivey =

American basketball player (born 1981)

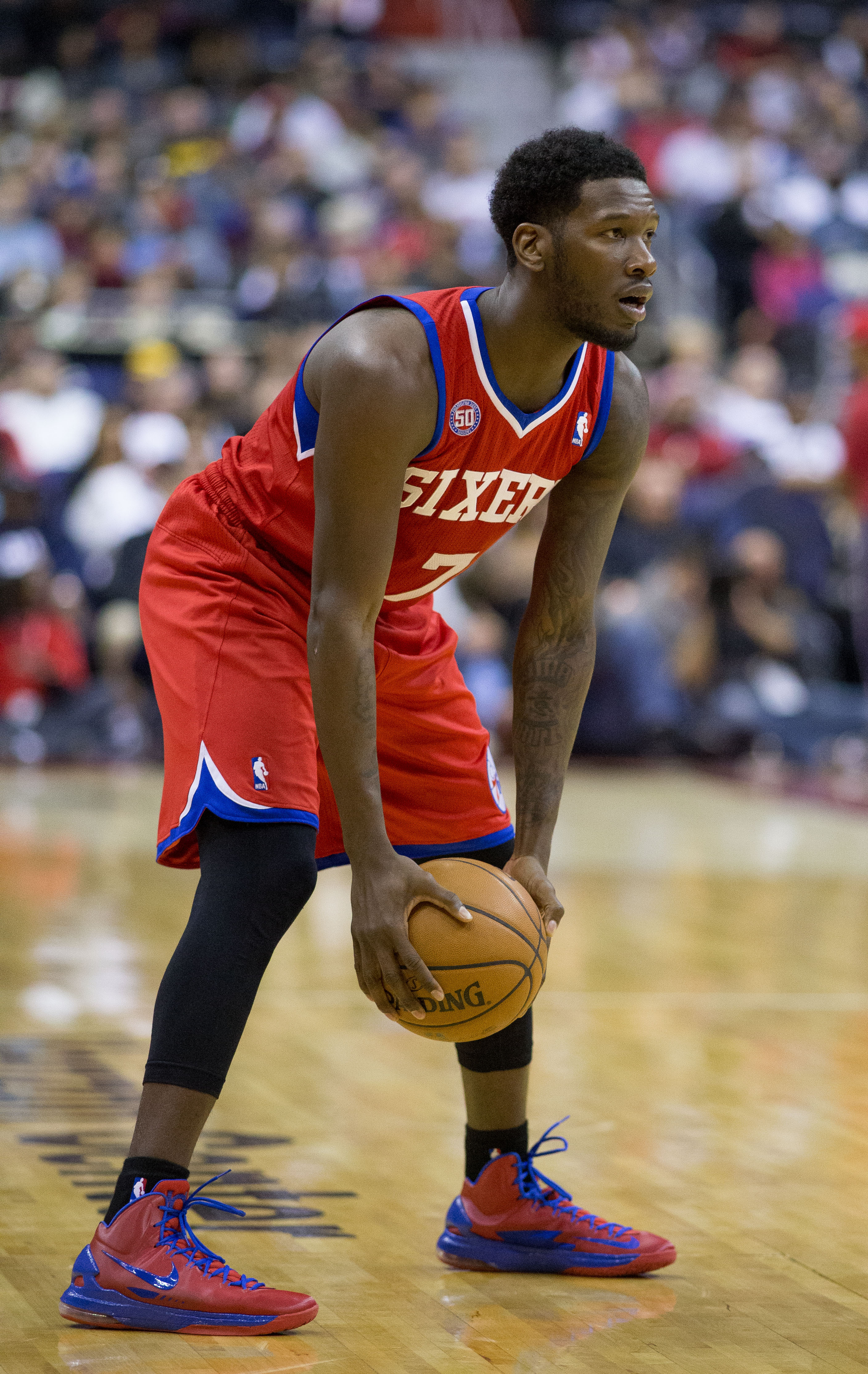
- Ivey with the Philadelphia 76ers in 2013

Houston Rockets
- Title: Assistant coach
- League: NBA

Personal information
- Born: December 20, 1981 (age 44) Harlem, New York, U.S.
- Listed height: 6 ft 4 in (1.93 m)
- Listed weight: 200 lb (91 kg)

Career information
- High school: Benjamin N. Cardozo (Queens, New York); Blair Academy (Blairstown, New Jersey)
- College: Texas (2000–2004)
- NBA draft: 2004: 2nd round, 37th overall pick
- Drafted by: Atlanta Hawks
- Playing career: 2004–2014
- Position: Shooting guard / point guard
- Number: 36, 12, 11, 7
- Coaching career: 2014–present

Career history

Playing
- 2004–2007: Atlanta Hawks
- 2007–2008: Milwaukee Bucks
- 2008–2010: Philadelphia 76ers
- 2010: Milwaukee Bucks
- 2010–2012: Oklahoma City Thunder
- 2012–2013: Philadelphia 76ers
- 2014: Oklahoma City Thunder
- 2014: Guangdong Southern Tigers

Coaching
- 2014–2016: Oklahoma City Blue (assistant)
- 2016–2018: Oklahoma City Thunder (assistant)
- 2018–2020: New York Knicks (assistant)
- 2020–2023: Brooklyn Nets (assistant)
- 2023–present: Houston Rockets (assistant)
- 2021–present: South Sudan

Career highlights
- 2× Big 12 All-Defensive Team (2003, 2004)
- Stats at NBA.com
- Stats at Basketball Reference

Royal Terence Ivey (/rɔɪˈæl/ roy-AL; born December 20, 1981) is an American professional basketball coach and former player who is an assistant coach for the Houston Rockets of the National Basketball Association (NBA). He is also the head coach of the South Sudan national team, who he coached at the 2023 World Cup and 2024 Olympics. He played college basketball for the Texas Longhorns before spending 10 years in the NBA.

== Early life and college ==
Ivey was born in Harlem in the Manhattan borough of New York City and started on the basketball team of Benjamin N. Cardozo High School, leading the team to a PSAL championship. He attended Blair Academy for a post-graduate year.

Ivey played college basketball at the University of Texas at Austin, in which he finished as the school's all-time career leader in games started (126).

== Professional career ==
Ivey was selected with the 37th overall pick in the 2004 NBA draft by the Atlanta Hawks.

On September 18, 2007, Ivey signed a one-year contract with the Bucks.

On July 24, 2008, Ivey agreed to terms with the Philadelphia 76ers.

On June 15, 2009, Philadelphia announced that Ivey declined the player option on his contract for the 2009–10 season, making him an unrestricted free agent. However, he re-signed with the 76ers in August 2009.

On February 18, 2010, Ivey was traded to the Milwaukee Bucks along with Primoz Brezec in exchange for Jodie Meeks and Francisco Elson.

On July 21, 2010, Ivey signed with the Oklahoma City Thunder. He reached the NBA Finals with the Thunder in 2012, but the team lost to the Miami Heat.

On July 27, 2012, Ivey returned to the 76ers.

On September 30, 2013, he signed with the Atlanta Hawks. However, he was waived on October 25.

On January 16, 2014, he signed a 10-day contract with the Oklahoma City Thunder. On January 26, 2014, his 10-day contract expired and the Thunder chose not to offer him a second 10-day contract.

On January 29, 2014, he signed with the Guangdong Southern Tigers of China for rest of the 2013–14 season.

== Coaching career ==
On September 29, 2014, Ivey was named an assistant coach for the Oklahoma City Blue of the NBA Development League for the 2014–15 season, effectively ending his 10-year playing career.

On July 1, 2016, Ivey was elevated from a player development assistant with the Blue to an assistant coach with the Oklahoma City Thunder.

On June 7, 2018, Ivey joined the New York Knicks as an assistant coach to David Fizdale. Ivey remained with the Knicks after Fizdale's firing and served under interim head coach Mike Miller.

On November 11, 2020, the Brooklyn Nets hired Ivey as an assistant coach under Steve Nash.

On July 3, 2023, Ivey was hired by the Houston Rockets as an assistant coach.

=== South Sudan national team ===
On May 3, 2021, Ivey signed a contract to become the head coach of the South Sudan national team, representing the youngest country in the world. He coached the team at AfroBasket 2021, the country's first major tournament. Ivey and South Sudan won the country's first AfroBasket game against Uganda, and eventually reached the quarterfinals where the team was eliminated by defending champions Tunisia.

Under Ivey's coaching, South Sudan qualified for their first ever World Cup in 2023 after going undefeated in first round qualifying. They went on to earn a first ever Olympic berth at the 2024 games by finishing as the best African team at the 2023 World Cup.

Ivey and South Sudan participated at the 2024 Olympics, where they won their first game over Puerto Rico, but went on to lose to Serbia and United States, thus ending their campaign in the preliminary round. Despite their elimination, the team was widely praised by media and competitors for their play.

== Personal life ==
Ivey is named after his grandfather, Roy Allen, who was one of the first African-American stage directors to work in television.

During the 2011 NBA lockout, Ivey returned to the University of Texas to finish his degree in applied learning and development. He got married in 2023 to Deanna Herrington.

== NBA career statistics ==
Legend
GP	Games played	GS	Games started	MPG	Minutes per game
FG%	Field goal percentage	3P%	3-point field goal percentage	FT%	Free throw percentage
RPG	Rebounds per game	APG	Assists per game	SPG	Steals per game
BPG	Blocks per game	PPG	Points per game	**Bold**	Career high

=== Regular season ===
Year	Team	GP	GS	MPG	FG%	3P%	FT%	RPG	APG	SPG	BPG	PPG
2004–05	Atlanta	62	5	13.0	.429	.333	.701	1.4	1.7	**.6**	**.1**	3.5
2005–06	Atlanta	73	**66**	13.4	.439	.400	.727	1.3	1.0	.3	**.1**	3.6
2006–07	Atlanta	53	18	10.2	.448	.313	.686	1.0	.8	.5	**.1**	3.0
2007–08	Milwaukee	**75**	20	**19.2**	.394	.327	.726	**1.6**	**2.1**	**.6**	**.1**	**5.6**
2008–09	Philadelphia	71	0	12.1	.332	.342	.791	1.1	.6	.5	**.1**	3.0
2009–10	Philadelphia	26	0	9.1	**.473**	**.500**	.857	1.0	.7	.4	**.1**	2.7
2009–10	Milwaukee	18	0	5.0	.321	.182	.600	.4	.6	.5	.0	1.3
2010–11	Oklahoma City	25	0	6.2	.421	.438	**1.000**	.6	.3	.2	.0	1.6
2011–12	Oklahoma City	34	0	10.4	.356	.340	.125	.7	.3	.4	.0	2.1
2012–13	Philadelphia	53	5	13.2	.431	.420	.563	1.1	.6	.4	**.1**	3.2
2013–14	Oklahoma City	2	0	2.5	.000	.000	.000	.5	.0	.0	.0	.0
Career		492	114	12.5	.406	.361	.706	1.1	1.0	.5	.1	3.3

=== Playoffs ===
Year	Team	GP	GS	MPG	FG%	3P%	FT%	RPG	APG	SPG	BPG	PPG
2009	Philadelphia	**6**	0	**7.5**	.273	.286	**.750**	**.7**	.0	**.5**	.0	1.8
2010	Milwaukee	3	0	3.7	.333	.000	.000	.0	**.7**	.0	**.3**	1.3
2011	Oklahoma City	2	0	3.0	**1.000**	**1.000**	.000	.5	.5	.0	.0	**3.0**
2012	Oklahoma City	5	0	4.2	.364	.400	.500	.6	.2	.4	.0	2.2
Career		16	0	5.1	.367	.375	.667	.5	.3	.3	.1	2.0
