= Dan Gadzuric =

Dutch basketball player (born 1978)

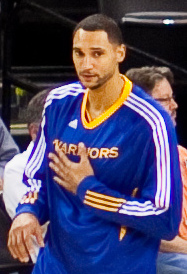
- Gadzuric with the Golden State Warriors in 2010

Personal information
- Born: February 2, 1978 (age 48) The Hague, Netherlands
- Listed height: 6 ft 11 in (2.11 m)
- Listed weight: 240 lb (109 kg)

Career information
- High school: Governor Dummer Academy (Byfield, Massachusetts)
- College: UCLA (1998–2002)
- NBA draft: 2002: 2nd round, 34th overall pick
- Drafted by: Milwaukee Bucks
- Playing career: 2002–2014
- Position: Center

Career history
- 2002–2010: Milwaukee Bucks
- 2010–2011: Golden State Warriors
- 2011: New Jersey Nets
- 2011: Jiangsu Dragons
- 2012: Texas Legends
- 2012: New York Knicks
- 2013: Marinos de Anzoátegui
- 2014: Petrochimi Bandar Imam

Career highlights
- First-team Parade All-American (1998); McDonald's All-American (1998)

Career NBA statistics
- Points: 2,465 (4.7 ppg)
- Rebounds: 2,326 (4.4 rpg)
- Assists: 196 (0.4 apg)
- Stats at NBA.com
- Stats at Basketball Reference

Daniel Gadzuric (Serbian: Даниел Гаџурић, romanized: Daniel Gadžurić; born February 2, 1978) is a Dutch-Serbian former professional basketball player. A center, Gadzuric attended preparatory school at The Governor's Academy in Byfield, Massachusetts, before playing college basketball for the Bruins at University of California, Los Angeles (UCLA). He was drafted by the Milwaukee Bucks in the 2002 NBA draft.

== Professional career ==
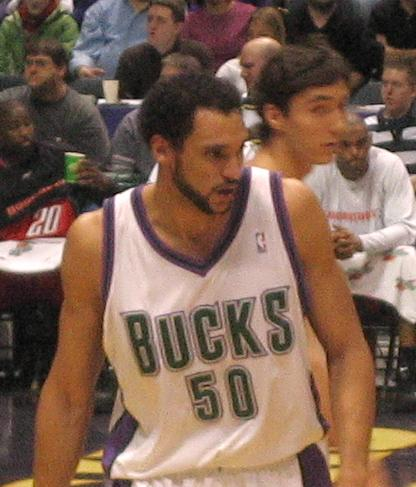
Gadzuric with the Milwaukee Bucks in 2006

Gadzuric was drafted as the 34th overall pick by the Milwaukee Bucks during the 2002 NBA draft.

On June 22, 2010, Gadzuric and Charlie Bell were traded to the Golden State Warriors for Corey Maggette after spending eight years with the Bucks.

On February 23, 2011, Gadzuric was traded to the New Jersey Nets along with Brandan Wright in exchange for Troy Murphy and a second round pick.

In October 2011, he signed with the Jiangsu Dragons in China.

He was signed by the New York Knicks on April 20, 2012. This ended up being his final season in the NBA, as Gadzuric's final game was on April 26, 2012, in a 104–84 win over the Charlotte Bobcats where he recorded 3 rebounds, 1 steal and 1 block.

On July 16, 2012, Gadzuric, Jared Jeffries, the rights to Giorgos Printezis and Kostas Papanikolaou and a 2016 second round pick were traded to the Portland Trail Blazers for Kurt Thomas and Raymond Felton.

On July 19, 2012, Gadzuric was waived by the Portland Trail Blazers. In September 2012, he joined the Philadelphia 76ers for their training camp. However, he did not make their final roster.

In February 2013, he joined the Marinos de Anzoátegui of the Venezuelan Liga Profesional de Baloncesto (LPB). With Marinos, he went on to lose the LPB finals to Cocodrilos de Caracas after a seven-game series.

On September 27, 2013, he signed with the Los Angeles Lakers. However, he was waived on October 9.

== National team career ==
Gadzuric played for the Netherlands. He made his debut on December 26, 1997, in an exhibition game against Cuba at the Haarlem Basketball Week. He went scoreless in 10 minutes of play, and it took ten years until he played another game with the Netherlands. In 2011, he played in another friendly game at the EuroJam 2011 tournament. Gadzuric only played a few FIBA official games for his national team.

== Family ==
Gadzuric's mother is from Belgrade, Serbia and his father is from Kingstown, St. Vincent and the Grenadines.

== Accomplishments ==
Gadzuric was named to the McDonald's All-American Team.

== NBA career statistics ==
Legend
GP	Games played	GS	Games started	MPG	Minutes per game
FG%	Field goal percentage	3P%	3-point field goal percentage	FT%	Free throw percentage
RPG	Rebounds per game	APG	Assists per game	SPG	Steals per game
BPG	Blocks per game	PPG	Points per game	**Bold**	Career high

=== Regular season ===
Year	Team	GP	GS	MPG	FG%	3P%	FT%	RPG	APG	SPG	BPG	PPG
2002–03	Milwaukee	49	30	15.5	.483	.000	.518	4.0	.2	.4	1.1	3.4
2003–04	Milwaukee	75	0	16.8	.524	.000	.492	4.6	.4	**.7**	**1.4**	5.7
2004–05	Milwaukee	**81**	**81**	**22.0**	.539	.000	.538	**8.3**	.4	.6	1.3	**7.3**
2005–06	Milwaukee	74	0	12.0	**.553**	.000	.461	3.1	.3	.3	.6	5.2
2006–07	Milwaukee	54	8	15.6	.474	.000	.467	4.6	.5	.4	.6	4.8
2007–08	Milwaukee	51	4	10.5	.416	.000	.524	2.8	.2	.4	.5	3.2
2008–09	Milwaukee	67	26	14.0	.480	.000	**.544**	3.8	**.6**	.5	.6	4.0
2009–10	Milwaukee	32	6	9.8	.438	.000	.400	2.9	.4	.3	.4	2.8
2010–11	Golden State	28	4	10.6	.420	.000	.357	3.1	.4	.4	.6	2.8
2010–11	New Jersey	14	5	11.9	.415	.000	.385	3.5	.2	.2	.8	2.8
2011–12	New York	2	0	6.5	.000	.000	.000	2.5	.0	.5	.5	.0
Career		527	164	14.8	.500	.000	.498	4.4	.4	.5	.9	4.7

=== Playoffs ===
Year	Team	GP	GS	MPG	FG%	3P%	FT%	RPG	APG	SPG	BPG	PPG
2004	Milwaukee	1	0	9.0	.500	.000	.000	1.0	**2.0**	**1.0**	.0	4.0
2006	Milwaukee	4	0	4.0	**.889**	.000	**.500**	1.0	.0	.0	.3	**4.3**
2010	Milwaukee	**7**	0	**10.9**	.529	.000	.250	**3.4**	.1	.1	**.7**	2.7
Career		12	0	8.3	.633	.000	.286	2.4	.3	.2	.5	3.3

== See also ==
- List of European basketball players in the United States
