= Charlie Bell (basketball) =

American basketball player (born 1979)

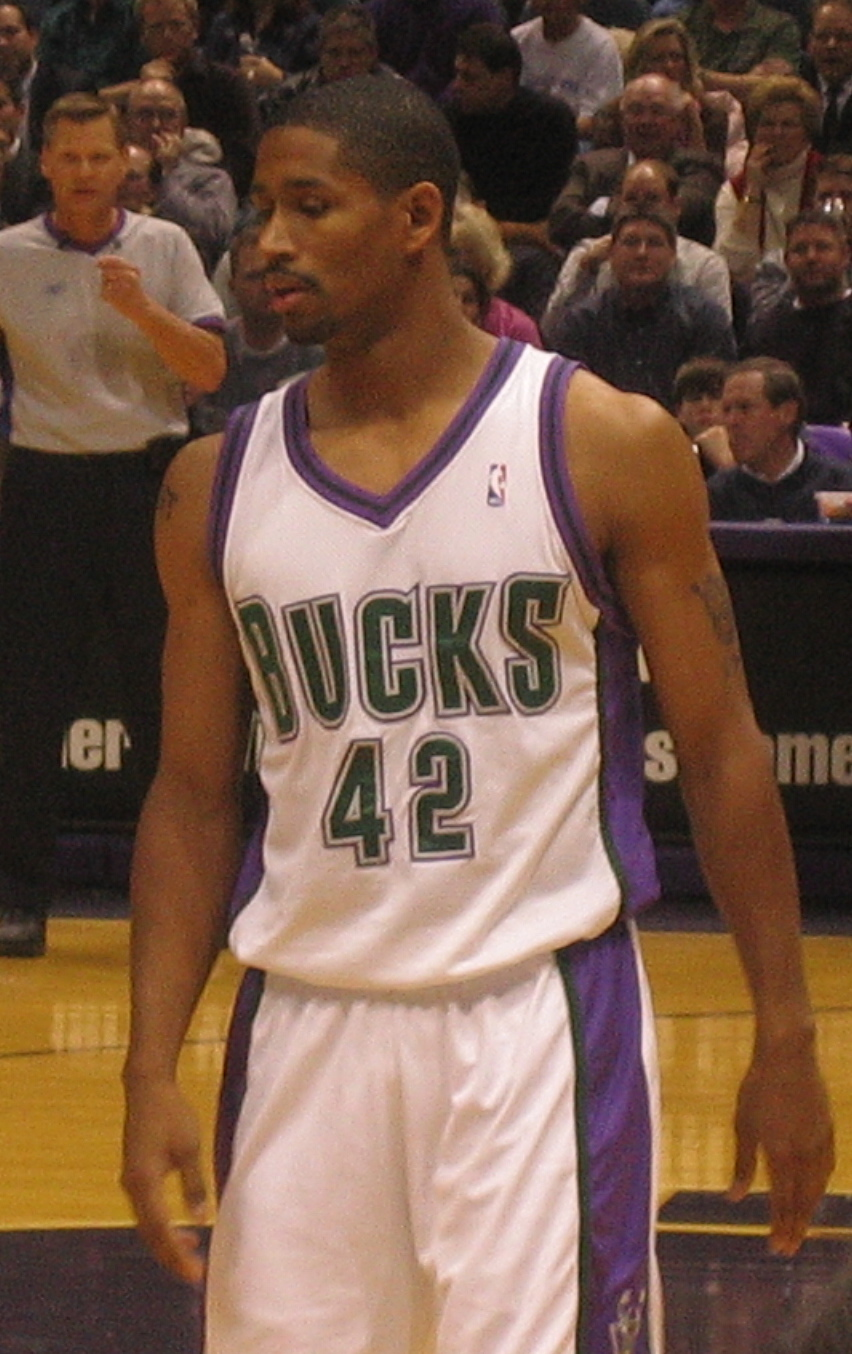
- Bell with the Milwaukee Bucks in 2005

Personal information
- Born: March 12, 1979 (age 47) Flint, Michigan, U.S.
- Listed height: 6 ft 3 in (1.91 m)
- Listed weight: 200 lb (91 kg)

Career information
- High school: Flint Southwestern (Flint, Michigan)
- College: Michigan State (1997–2001)
- NBA draft: 2001: undrafted
- Playing career: 2001–2012
- Position: Shooting guard
- Number: 14, 3, 42, 34
- Coaching career: 2016–2019

Career history

Playing
- 2001: Phoenix Suns
- 2001–2002: Phoenix Eclipse
- 2002: Dallas Mavericks
- 2002: Benetton Basket
- 2002–2003: Virtus Bologna
- 2003–2004: Mabo Livorno
- 2004–2005: Leche Río Breogán
- 2005–2010: Milwaukee Bucks
- 2010–2011: Golden State Warriors
- 2012: Otto Caserta

Coaching
- 2016–2017: Texas Legends (assistant)
- 2017–2019: Iowa Wolves (assistant)

Career highlights
- As player: Italian League champion (2002); Italian League Top Scorer (2004); Spanish League Top Scorer (2005); All-Spanish League First Team (2005); NCAA champion (2000); Second-team All-American – NABC (2001); Third-team All-American – AP (2001); Fourth-team Parade All-American (1997)
- Stats at NBA.com
- Stats at Basketball Reference

Charlie Will Bell III (born March 12, 1979) is an American professional former basketball player and coach. He played college basketball for the Michigan State Spartans, and then played parts of eight seasons in the NBA. He also served as an assistant coach for the Iowa Wolves of the NBA G League. and as an assistant coach for the Texas Legends of the NBA G League.

== High school ==
Bell played high school basketball at Flint Southwestern Academy High School, in Flint, Michigan.

== College career ==
Bell had an excellent college basketball career at Michigan State, appearing in three straight NCAA Final Fours, and being named Michigan State Defensive Player of the Year in each of the four years he played there. He was a starter for the Spartans in their 2000 National Championship season.

== Professional playing career ==
Bell wasn't selected in the NBA draft, but he was signed by the Phoenix Suns, on July 23, 2001, as a free agent, and played five games for them. After being released by the Suns, he signed with the Phoenix Eclipse of the ABA and played four games for them. He initially signed a 10-day contract with the Dallas Mavericks on January 10, 2002, and was then signed for the remainder of the season on January 15, but only appeared in two games.

After a rather brief stint in the NBA, Bell took his career to Europe to play in the Italian and Spanish Leagues where he was regarded as a star. In March 2002, he signed with Benetton Treviso, of the Italian League, and he won the Italian League championship with Treviso. In the 2002–03 season, he played with Virtus (Kinder) Bologna, but he was injured in December 2002, and was sidelined for most of the season. In August 2003, he signed with Mabo Livorno, also of the Italian League. In July 2004, he signed with Leche Rio Breogan Lugo, of the Spanish League, and he was named to the All-Spanish League First team for the 2004–05 season. He was also the top scorer of the Spanish league, and he was a three time Spanish League player of the month.

Bell signed with the Milwaukee Bucks for the 2005–06 season, and on March 28, 2006, had his best performance since entering the league, recording his first career triple-double in the Bucks' 132–110 win over the Suns. Bell had then-career highs of 19 points, 13 assists, and 10 rebounds to lead Milwaukee. Bell, who played only seven games in his prior NBA season in 2001–02, appeared in 59 games (starting in six) for the Bucks in the 2005–2006 regular season, and finished with averages of 8.4 points, 2.2 assists, and 2.0 rebounds in 21.7 minutes per game. That postseason, Bell led the Bucks in scoring with a postseason career-high 13 points in 24 minutes of playing time during their first game, a 92-74 Game 1 loss to the Detroit Pistons. The Bucks would end up losing the series four games to one.

The following season, to 13 points, 3 rebounds and 3 assists per games in 35 minutes on average, while appearing in all 82 games.

On September 17, 2007, being a restricted free agent, Bell signed an offer sheet from the Miami Heat worth $18,500,000 over five years. Although he stated that he did not want to play for Milwaukee, they decided to match the offer three days later.

On June 22, 2010, Bell, along with Dan Gadzuric, was traded to the Golden State Warriors for Corey Maggette. He was waived by the Warriors under the amnesty clause prior to the 2011–12 NBA season.

Bell's final NBA game was on February 22, 2011, in a 93 - 115 loss to the Boston Celtics where Bell played for only 2 minutes and recorded no stats.

In January 2012, he signed with Pepsi Caserta.

== Coaching career ==
On November 3, 2016, Bell was hired by the Texas Legends of the NBA Development League to be an assistant coach. Later, Bell was hired by the Iowa Wolves to become an Assistant Coach, this is where he will be for a few years.

== Off the court ==
Bell stars in a popular series of webisodes titled, "Hey Charlie, Do My Job!" in which he takes up a fan's occupation (e.g. working at Wendy's, or being an interior decorator) for a day, and currently works for UWM (United Wholesale Mortgage) as an Account Executive.

== Career statistics ==
Legend
GP	Games played	GS	Games started	MPG	Minutes per game
FG%	Field goal percentage	3P%	3-point field goal percentage	FT%	Free throw percentage
RPG	Rebounds per game	APG	Assists per game	SPG	Steals per game
BPG	Blocks per game	PPG	Points per game	**Bold**	Career high
*	Led the league

=== College ===
Year	Team	GP	GS	MPG	FG%	3P%	FT%	RPG	APG	SPG	BPG	PPG
1997–98	Michigan State	30	30	24.2	.435	.339	.793	4.4	1.3	0.6	0.0	9.2
1998–99	Michigan State	38	34	22.7	**.477**	'**.356**	.754	3.8	1.3	0.6	0.1	7.8
1999–2000	Michigan State	**39**	**38**	27.6	.453	.342	**.802**	**4.9**	3.2	**1.2**	**0.2**	11.5
2000–01	Michigan State	33	33	**31.3**	.402	.342	.770	4.7	**5.1**	1.0	**0.2**	**13.5**
Career		140	135	26.4	.439	.343	.782	4.5	2.7	0.9	0.1	10.5

=== NBA ===
==== Regular season ====
Year	Team	GP	GS	MPG	FG%	3P%	FT%	RPG	APG	SPG	BPG	PPG
2001–02	Phoenix	5	0	8.4	.273	.000	**1.000**	.8	.4	.0	.0	1.6
2001–02	Dallas	2	0	1.0	.000	.000	.000	.5	.0	.0	.0	.0
2005–06	Milwaukee	59	6	21.7	**.439**	**.423**	.708	2.0	2.2	1.0	.1	8.4
2006–07	Milwaukee	**82***	**64**	**34.7**	.437	.352	.780	**2.9**	3.0	**1.2**	.1	**13.5**
2007–08	Milwaukee	68	5	23.9	.381	.341	.805	2.5	**3.1**	.8	.0	7.6
2008–09	Milwaukee	70	23	25.5	.414	.363	.825	1.9	2.2	.7	.1	8.4
2009–10	Milwaukee	71	39	22.7	.381	.365	.716	1.9	1.5	.6	**.2**	6.5
2010–11	Golden State	19	0	9.0	.279	.286	.500	.9	.7	.3	.0	1.7
Career		376	137	24.9	.412	.361	.769	2.2	2.3	.8	.1	8.5

==== NBA playoffs ====
Year	Team	GP	GS	MPG	FG%	3P%	FT%	RPG	APG	SPG	BPG	PPG
2006	Milwaukee	**5**	0	**21.6**	**.395**	**.455**	**1.000**	**.6**	**1.4**	**.6**	**.4**	**9.2**
2010	Milwaukee	3	0	2.7	.000	.000	.000	.0	.0	.0	.0	.0
Career		8	0	14.5	.378	.417	1.000	.4	.9	.4	.2	5.8
