= Darnell Jackson =

American basketball player (born 1985)

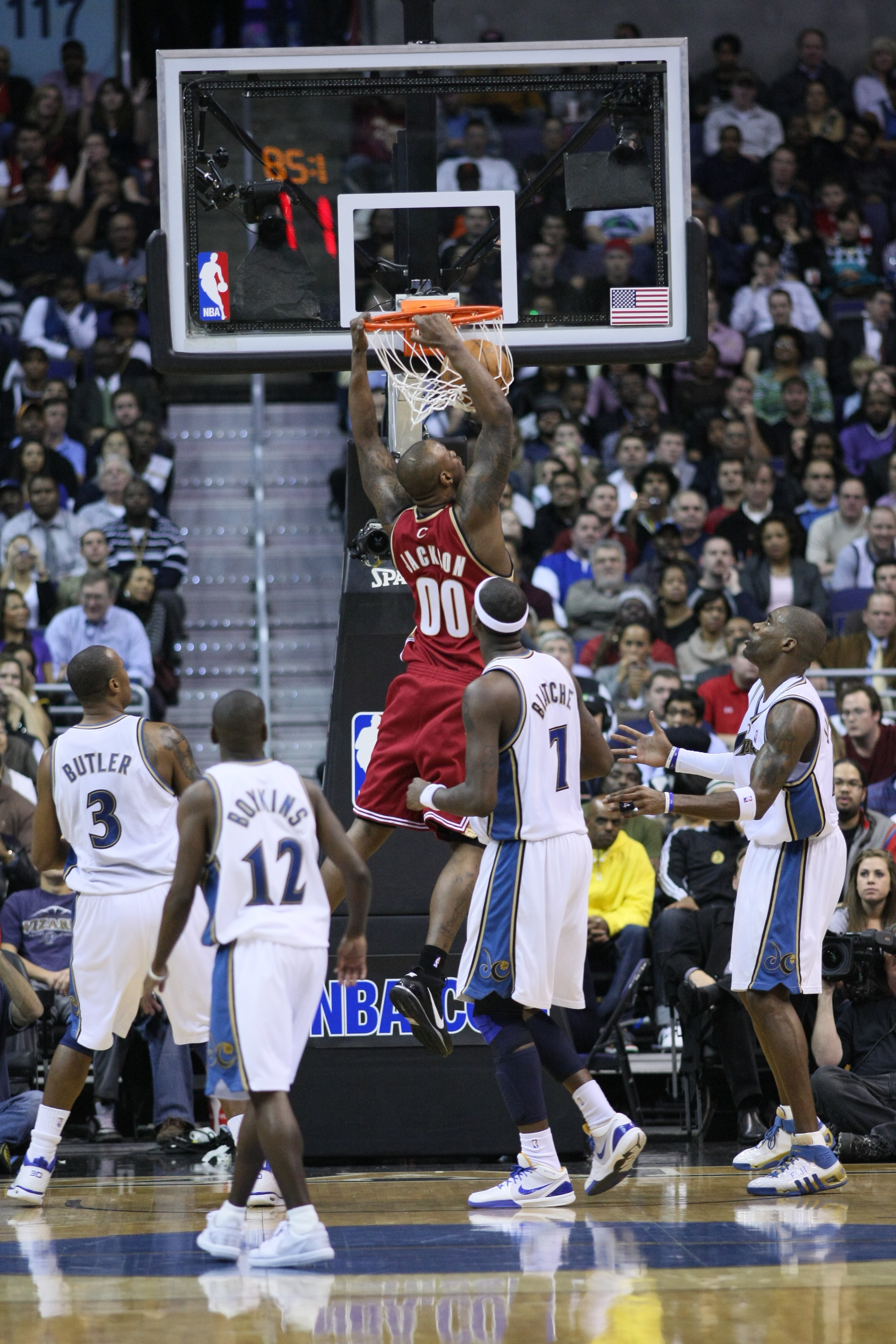
- Jackson dunking during his time with Cleveland

San Diego Clippers
- Title: Assistant coach
- League: NBA G League

Personal information
- Born: November 7, 1985 (age 41) Oklahoma City, Oklahoma, U.S.
- Listed height: 6 ft 9 in (2.06 m)
- Listed weight: 253 lb (115 kg)

Career information
- High school: Midwest City (Midwest City, Oklahoma)
- College: Kansas (2004–2008)
- NBA draft: 2008: 2nd round, 52nd overall pick
- Drafted by: Miami Heat
- Playing career: 2008–2020
- Position: Power forward

Career history

Playing
- 2008–2010: Cleveland Cavaliers
- 2009–2010: →Erie BayHawks
- 2010: Milwaukee Bucks
- 2010–2011: Sacramento Kings
- 2011–2012: Donetsk
- 2012–2013: Reno Bighorns
- 2013: Xinjiang Flying Tigers
- 2013: Reno Bighorns
- 2013–2014: Shanghai Sharks
- 2014: Meralco Bolts
- 2014–2015: Westchester Knicks
- 2015: Anhui Dragons
- 2015–2016: Yeşilgiresun Belediye
- 2016: Marinos de Anzoátegui
- 2016–2017: Rosa Radom
- 2017: Boulazac
- 2017–2018: PAOK
- 2018–2019: Eisbären Bremerhaven
- 2019–2020: Spójnia Stargard
- 2020: Stal Ostrów Wielkopolski

Coaching
- 2019–present: Big 3 - Detroit Amplifiers

Career highlights
- NCAA champion (2008)
- Stats at NBA.com
- Stats at Basketball Reference

Darnell Edred Jackson (born November 7, 1985) is an American former professional basketball player, who is currently an assistant coach for the San Diego Clippers of the NBA G League and plays in the Big 3 League for the Detroit Amplifiers. He played college basketball for the University of Kansas for four seasons, including the 2008 national championship team. He did not become a regular starter at Kansas until the 2007–08 season (his senior year), when he replaced Sasha Kaun in the starting lineup.

== High school career ==
Jackson began playing organized basketball for the first time as a ninth grader at Midwest City High School.

Considered a four-star recruit by Rivals.com, Jackson was listed as the No. 12 power forward and the No. 54 player in the nation in 2004.

== College career ==
He was called one of the most improved players in the nation after averaging 6.7 rebounds during his senior season at Kansas in 2007–08. He attracted some attention from NBA scouts after several breakout performances, including a 25-point, 9-rebound effort against Boston College. After this performance, he was named the co-winner of the Phillips 66 Big 12 Conference Player of the Week.

In 2005, Jackson's sophomore year, Jackson was suspended for nine games for accepting payments from Kansas booster Don Davis, a family friend. This was part of a rough year for him, as his grandmother had been killed by a drunk driver earlier in 2005. After scoring, Jackson often thumped his chest three times. Symbolically, one of the thumps was for Jackson's grandmother, one was for his mother, and one was for Davis.

He played a big role in the Jayhawks' 2008 championship season, leading the team in rebounds and shooting percentage.

== Professional career ==
=== Drafted and signed by Cleveland ===
Jackson was selected as the 52nd overall pick in the 2008 NBA draft by the Miami Heat on June 26. He was traded to the Cavaliers on the same day. Sasha Kaun, his former Jayhawks teammate and fellow 2008 draft pick, was also acquired by the Cavaliers (from the Seattle SuperSonics). Kaun was acquired by Cleveland during the 2015–2016 season, played in 25 games, and won a championship with the team. Jackson was signed by the team on September 6, 2008.

=== 2008 NBA Summer League ===
Jackson played for the Cavaliers during the NBA (National Basketball Association) Summer League in Las Vegas, Nevada. In five games (four starts) he averaged 5.8 points and 5.4 rebounds in 24.6 minutes per game.

=== 2008–09 ===
Jackson broke his wrist during the preseason and was inactive for the first 13 games of the Cavaliers' regular season. Jackson made his professional debut on November 25, 2008, against the New York Knicks. In six minutes of play, he scored four points on a perfect 2–2 from the field and grabbed two rebounds. On February 9, 2009, Jackson was assigned by the Cavs to their affiliate D-League team, the Erie Bayhawks. He played one game before being recalled back to the Cavs, a day later. In his only game with Erie, Jackson scored a game-high 24 points (on 10-of-14 field goals) in 26 minutes in a 101–89 win over Utah.

=== 2009–10 ===
On February 24, 2010, Jackson was assigned to the Erie BayHawks of the NBA D-League. On February 26, 2010, Jackson was recalled by the Cavaliers after Shaquille O'Neal sustained a significant thumb injury against the Boston Celtics on February 25. Jackson was sent down again on March 20, and recalled the next day. On March 23, he was waived by Cleveland due to the return of star center Zydrunas Ilgauskas. He was then claimed off waivers by the Milwaukee Bucks.

=== 2010–11 ===
On July 21, 2010, Jackson was traded to the Sacramento Kings for forward Jon Brockman.

=== 2011–12 ===
During the 2011 NBA lockout, he signed with BC Donetsk of the Ukrainian Basketball SuperLeague.

=== 2012–13 ===
On November 1, 2012, Jackson was acquired by the Reno Bighorns of the NBA D-League. He left in January 2013 to sign in China. In March 2013, he rejoined the Bighorns.

=== 2013–14 ===
On September 10, 2013, he signed with the Indiana Pacers. However, he was waived on October 17. Later that month, he signed with the Shanghai Sharks of China.

In March 2014, he signed with the Meralco Bolts of the Philippine Basketball Association.

=== 2014–15 ===
On October 31, 2014, Jackson's rights were traded from Reno to the Westchester Knicks in exchange for a first-round pick and the rights to Stefhon Hannah. He officially joined the Knicks on November 3, 2014.

=== 2015–16 ===
In May 2015, Jackson signed with the Anhui Dragons of the Chinese National Basketball League (NBL). In November 2015, he signed with Yeşilgiresun Belediye of the Turkish League. He averaged 16.2 points and 6.7 rebounds per game.

On April 28, 2016, Jackson signed with Marinos de Anzoátegui of the Venezuelan League.

=== 2016–17 ===
On September 5, 2016, Jackson signed with Polish club Rosa Radom for the 2016–17 season.

=== 2019–20 ===
On October 24, 2019, he has signed with Spójnia Stargard of the PLK.

On February 1, 2020, he has signed with BM Slam Ostrów Wielkopolski of the PLK.

== Career statistics ==
=== College ===
Legend
GP	Games played	GS	Games started	MPG	Minutes per game
FG%	Field goal percentage	3P%	3-point field goal percentage	FT%	Free throw percentage
RPG	Rebounds per game	APG	Assists per game	SPG	Steals per game
BPG	Blocks per game	PPG	Points per game	**Bold**	Career high

Denotes seasons in which Jackson won an NCAA championship
Led the NCAA

Year	Team	GP	GS	MPG	FG%	3P%	FT%	RPG	APG	SPG	BPG	PPG
2004–05	Kansas	24		7.0	.548		.583	1.7	0.1	0.2	0.1	2.0
2005–06	Kansas	23		15.3	.505		**.769**	4.9	0.3	0.6	0.1	6.3
2006–07	Kansas	38		15.3	.550		.657	5.1	0.3	0.4	**0.6**	5.5
2007–08	Kansas	**40**		**24.3**	**.626**	**.333**	.691	**6.7**	**1.1**	**0.8**	0.5	**11.2**

=== NBA ===
==== Regular season ====
Year	Team	GP	GS	MPG	FG%	3P%	FT%	RPG	APG	SPG	BPG	PPG
2008–09	Cleveland	51	**2**	8.4	.430	.000	**.686**	1.7	**.2**	**.2**	**.1**	1.9
2009–10	Cleveland	27	0	4.2	.320	**.333**	.667	.7	.1	.1	**.1**	.8
2009–10	Milwaukee	1	0	**9.0**	.200	.0	.000	**2.0**	.0	.0	.0	2.0
2010–11	Sacramento	**59**	**2**	8.2	**.487**	.273	.612	1.6	**.2**	**.2**	**.1**	**3.2**
Career		138	4	7.5	.449	.235	.644	1.5	.2	.2	.1	2.2

==== Playoffs ====
Year	Team	GP	GS	MPG	FG%	3P%	FT%	RPG	APG	SPG	BPG	PPG
2009	Cleveland	5	0	5.0	.200	–	.000	1.0	.2	.0	.0	.4
