= Primož Brezec =

Slovenian basketball player (born 1979)

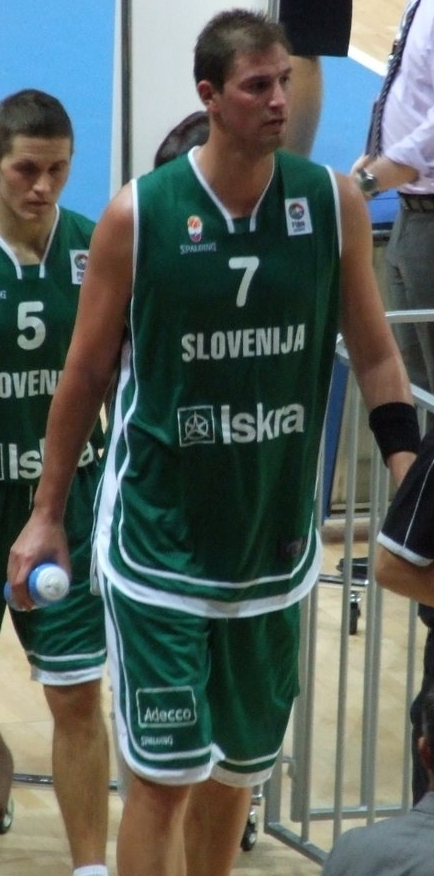
- Brezec in 2009.

Cleveland Cavaliers
- Title: Scout
- League: NBA

Personal information
- Born: October 2, 1979 (age 47) Postojna, SR Slovenia, Yugoslavia
- Listed height: 7 ft 1 in (2.16 m)
- Listed weight: 255 lb (116 kg)

Career information
- NBA draft: 2000: 1st round, 27th overall pick
- Drafted by: Indiana Pacers
- Playing career: 1996–2017
- Position: Center
- Number: 27, 7, 1, 9

Career history
- 1996–1998: Kraski Zidar
- 1998–2001: Union Olimpija
- 2001–2004: Indiana Pacers
- 2004–2007: Charlotte Bobcats
- 2007–2008: Detroit Pistons
- 2008: Toronto Raptors
- 2008–2009: Lottomatica Roma
- 2009–2010: Philadelphia 76ers
- 2010: Milwaukee Bucks
- 2010–2011: Krasnye Krylya
- 2011–2012: Lokomotiv Kuban
- 2012–2014: Nizhny Novgorod
- 2015: AEK Larnaca
- 2015: Al Kuwait
- 2015–2017: AEK Larnaca
- 2017: Al-Ahli Manama

Career highlights
- 2× Slovenian League champion (1999, 2001); 3× Slovenian Cup winner (1999–2001); 2× Slovenian All-Star (1999, 2001); Cypriot League champion (2015); EuroLeague records since the 2000–01 season: Most 2-point field goals made in a game without a miss
- Stats at NBA.com
- Stats at Basketball Reference

Primož Brezec (born October 2, 1979) is a Slovenian former professional basketball player. He is a 7 ft 1 in (2.16 m) tall center. Brezec has played eight seasons in the NBA.

== Professional career ==
=== Europe/Asia ===
Brezec grew up in Sežana, where he also made his professional debut with the local team Kraski Zidar. During his high school years, he was a member of the basketball team and a major star of the ŠKL League, the national high school league. As a professional, he played for the Slovenian Premier A League club Union Olimpija Ljubljana from 1998 until 2001.

Brezec spent the next 7 seasons playing in the NBA in the United States and Canada. He returned to Europe on July 20, 2008, when he signed a 2-year contract with Lottomatica Roma of the Italian league.

On September 26, 2010, Brezec signed with BC Krasnye Krylya Samara of the Russian Professional Basketball League.

In July 2011, he signed with Lokomotiv Kuban for one season, but he was waived in February 2012.

In March 2012, he signed with BC Nizhny Novgorod.

On February 10, 2015, he signed a two-month deal with AEK Larnaca of the Cyprus Basketball Division 1. He won the title in Cyprus with AEK Larnaca averaging 14.9 points and 7 rebounds per game.

On May 7, 2015, after his contract expired, he signed with Al Kuwait of the Kuwaiti Division I Basketball League.

On June 18, 2015, he re-signed with AEK Larnaca.

On September 2, 2017, he announced his retirement from professional basketball, and joined the Cleveland Cavaliers as international scout.

=== NBA ===
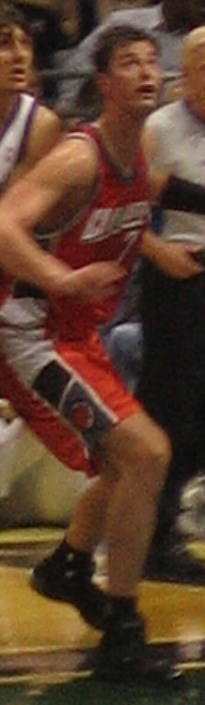
Brezec with the Charlotte Bobcats in 2006.

Brezec was chosen by the Indiana Pacers with the 27th overall pick of the 2000 NBA draft. After he spent three years in Indiana with little playing time, he was picked up in the 2004 NBA expansion draft by the Charlotte Bobcats. As the Bobcats' starting center, Brezec averaged career-highs of 13.0 points and 7.4 rebounds per game during the 2004–05 NBA season. He also scored the first points, made the first turnover, and hit the first free-throws in the history of the franchise. After the season, he would re-sign on a three-year, $8.25 million contract.

On December 14, 2007, Brezec, along with Bobcats teammate Wálter Herrmann, was traded to the Detroit Pistons in exchange for center Nazr Mohammed.

At the 2008 NBA trade deadline, which was on February 21, Brezec, along with cash considerations, was traded to the Toronto Raptors in exchange for Juan Dixon. During his Raptors debut, he hit all five of his shots and finished with 11 points, three rebounds and a block in 13 minutes off the bench against the New York Knicks in a February 24 win.

In August 2009, he returned to the NBA when he signed with the Philadelphia 76ers.

On February 18, 2010, Brezec was traded to the Milwaukee Bucks along with Royal Ivey in exchange for Jodie Meeks and Francisco Elson. His final NBA game was played on May 2, in Game 7 of the Eastern Conference First Round against the Atlanta Hawks. The Bucks lost the game 74–95, (thus losing the series) with Brezec recording five points and two rebounds.

== National team career ==
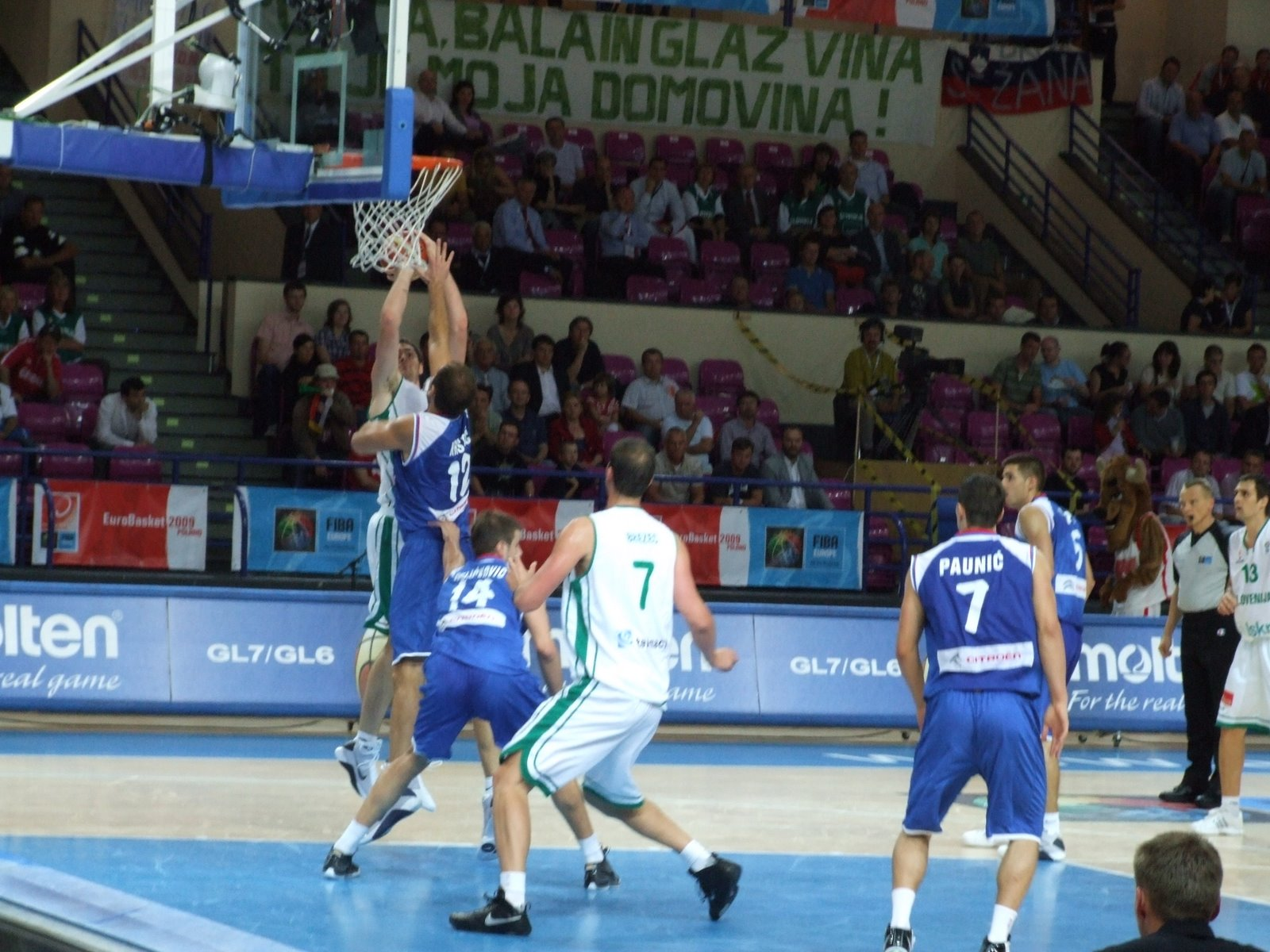
Brezec (#7) at EuroBasket 2009

Brezec was also a member of the senior Slovenia national team during his playing career. He played for Slovenia at two EuroBasket tournaments, in 2003 and 2005, while also appearing at two World Cups, in 2006 and 2010.

== NBA career statistics ==
Legend
GP	Games played	GS	Games started	MPG	Minutes per game
FG%	Field goal percentage	3P%	3-point field goal percentage	FT%	Free throw percentage
RPG	Rebounds per game	APG	Assists per game	SPG	Steals per game
BPG	Blocks per game	PPG	Points per game	**Bold**	Career high

=== Regular season ===
Year	Team	GP	GS	MPG	FG%	3P%	FT%	RPG	APG	SPG	BPG	PPG
2001–02	Indiana	22	4	7.3	.483	.000	.600	1.3	.3	.0	.3	2.0
2002–03	Indiana	22	1	5.0	.395	.000	.600	1.0	.2	.1	.2	1.9
2003–04	Indiana	18	0	4.0	.462	.000	.667	.8	.2	.0	.2	1.6
2004–05	Charlotte	72	72	**31.6**	.512	.000	**.745**	**7.4**	**1.2**	**.5**	**.8**	**13.0**
2005–06	Charlotte	**79**	**79**	27.4	.517	.000	.732	5.6	.6	.2	.4	12.4
2006–07	Charlotte	58	40	14.4	.445	**.333**	.632	3.2	.4	.2	.4	5.0
2007–08	Charlotte	20	18	13.4	.395	.000	.600	2.2	.3	.0	.2	1.9
2007–08	Detroit	17	0	5.8	**.769**	.000	.500	1.1	.2	.1	.1	1.6
2007–08	Toronto	13	0	8.5	.447	.000	.667	1.4	.1	.1	.2	3.7
2009–10	Philadelphia	7	0	5.1	.154	.000	.500	1.7	.0	.1	.1	.7
2009–10	Milwaukee	14	0	4.2	.538	.000	.000	.9	.1	.0	.1	1.0
Career		342	214	18.1	.498	.167	.701	3.9	.5	.2	.4	7.2

=== Playoffs ===
Year	Team	GP	GS	MPG	FG%	3P%	FT%	RPG	APG	SPG	BPG	PPG
2010	Milwaukee	4	0	6.3	.571	.000	.500	.8	.0	.3	.0	2.3
