= 2009–10 Cleveland Cavaliers season =

NBA professional basketball team season

- Division champions
- Head coach: Mike Brown
- General manager: Danny Ferry
- Owner: Dan Gilbert
- Arena: Quicken Loans Arena

Results
- Record: 61–21 (.744)
- Place: Division: 1st (Central); Conference: 1st (Eastern)
- Playoff finish: Conference Semifinals (lost to Celtics 2–4)
- Stats at Basketball Reference

Local media
- Television: Fox Sports Ohio; WUAB
- Radio: WTAM

Commemorative logo celebrating the Cavaliers' 40th season

The 2009–10 Cleveland Cavaliers season was the 40th season of the franchise in the National Basketball Association (NBA). The Cavaliers finished with the best record in the NBA at 61–21, earning them first place in the East. The season saw LeBron James win the MVP Award for the second straight year. This also was the last season LeBron James playing for the Cavaliers until the 2014-15 season. The Cavaliers had the fifth best team offensive rating in the NBA.

After defeating the Derrick Rose-led Chicago Bulls in the first round in five games, the Cavs faced the 4th-seeded Boston Celtics in the Semifinals where the Cavaliers were favored to beat them, but were upset in six games despite being up 2–1, marking their second straight upset loss in the playoffs after finishing with the best record in the NBA. The Celtics would advance to the NBA Finals and lose to the Los Angeles Lakers in seven games. Following the season, Danny Ferry stepped down as general manager, head coach Mike Brown was fired, James signed as a free agent with the Miami Heat, Shaquille O'Neal signed as a free agent for his final season with the Boston Celtics, and Zydrunas Ilgauskas left to play his final season with the Heat.

After LeBron's departure, the Cavaliers struggled greatly without him for four seasons, and entered a state of rebuilding. The Cavaliers did not make the playoffs again until 2015, when LeBron returned to the Cavaliers, who drafted All-Star Kyrie Irving and traded for All-Star Kevin Love.

Until 2025, this was the last time that the Cavaliers had won 60 or more games. This was also the last time that LeBron did not appear in the NBA Finals until 2019, and the last time his team would be eliminated before the Finals until 2021, when the Los Angeles Lakers lost to the Phoenix Suns in six games in the first round, which was also the first time in James' career that he exited in the first round.

== Key dates ==
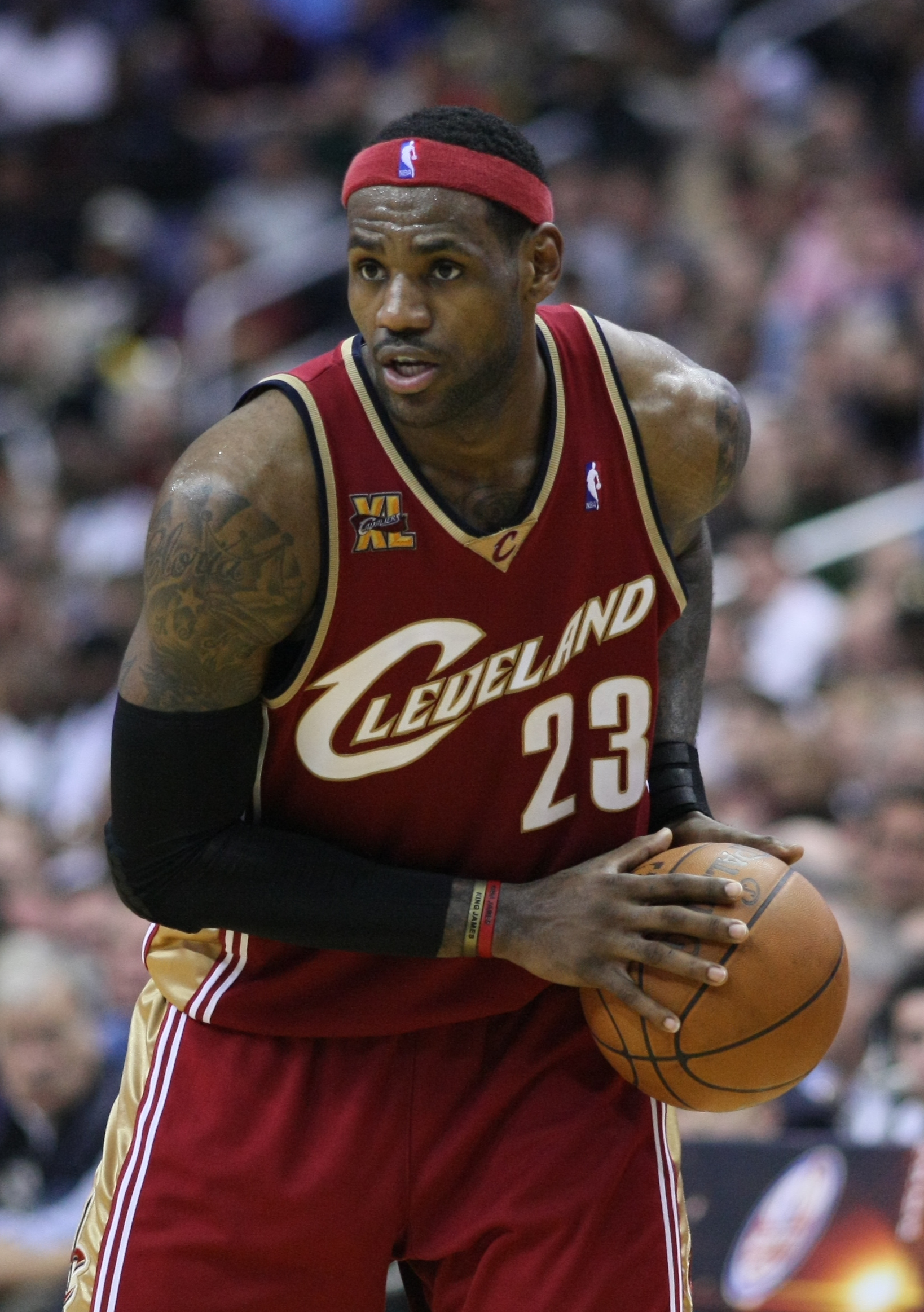
LeBron James in a game against the Wizards. James was the 2009–10 MVP.

- June 25 – The 2009 NBA draft took place in New York City. The Cavs also acquire Shaquille O'Neal, in a trade with the Phoenix Suns.
- July 8 – The free agency period started.
- July 13 – The Cavs sign with Anthony Parker.
- July 19 – Jamario Moon signs with the Cleveland Cavaliers.
- August 12 – The Cavaliers sign with Leon Powe.
- October 6 – The Cavs open the Pre-Season, with a victory over the Charlotte Bobcats, in The Q.
- October 21 – The Cavs close the Pre-Season, losing to the Boston Celtics, in the Value City Arena.
- October 27 – The Cleveland Cavaliers open the Regular Season, and are defeated by the Boston Celtics, in Quicken Loans Arena.
- February 17 – The Cavs acquire Antawn Jamison and Sebastian Telfair, in a three-team trade, with the Washington Wizards and the Los Angeles Clippers.
- March 17 – The Cavaliers clinched the Central Division title for the second straight year, and the third time in franchise history.
- March 23 – The Cavs waive Darnell Jackson and sign with Žydrūnas Ilgauskas.
- April 2 – The Cavaliers clinched best record in the Eastern Conference for the second straight year, and the second time in franchise history.
- April 4 – The Cavaliers clinched the best record in the league, and thus home court advantage throughout the playoffs for the second straight year, and the second time in franchise history.
- April 14 – The Cavs close the Regular Season, with a loss against the Atlanta Hawks and a 61–21 record.
- April 17 – The Cleveland Cavaliers open the First Round of the Playoffs, with a 96–83 victory, over the Chicago Bulls, in The Q.
- April 27 – The Cavaliers close the First Round Series at 4–1, with a 96–94 victory over the Bulls, in The Q.
- May 1 – The Cavs open the Eastern Conference semifinals, with a 101–93 victory, over the Celtics, in the Quicken Loans Arena.
- May 13- The Cavaliers lose in the Eastern Conference semifinals, at 4–2 to the underdog Boston Celtics.
- May 24 – Head Coach Mike Brown was fired.

== Draft picks ==
Round	Pick	Player	Position	Nationality	College/Club Team
1	30	Christian Eyenga	G/F	(Democratic Republic of the Congo) DR Congo	CB Prat
2	46	Danny Green	G/F	United States	North Carolina

== Roster ==
2009–10 Cleveland Cavaliers roster
Players

Pos.	No.	Player	Height	Weight	DOB	From
PG	1	Daniel Gibson	6 ft 2 in (1.88 m)	190 lb (86 kg)	1986–02–27	Texas
SG	14	Danny Green	6 ft 6 in (1.98 m)	210 lb (95 kg)	1987–06–22	North Carolina
PF	21	JJ Hickson	6 ft 9 in (2.06 m)	242 lb (110 kg)	1988–09–04	NC State
C	11	Zydrunas Ilgauskas	7 ft 3 in (2.21 m)	260 lb (118 kg)	1975–06–05	Lithuania
SF	23	LeBron James	6 ft 8 in (2.03 m)	250 lb (113 kg)	1984–12–30	St. Vincent–St. Mary HS (OH)
PF	4	Antawn Jamison	6 ft 9 in (2.06 m)	235 lb (107 kg)	1976–06–12	North Carolina
SF	15	Jamario Moon	6 ft 8 in (2.03 m)	200 lb (91 kg)	1980–06–13	Meridian CC
C	33	Shaquille O'Neal	7 ft 1 in (2.16 m)	350 lb (159 kg)	1972–03–06	LSU
SG	18	Anthony Parker	6 ft 6 in (1.98 m)	215 lb (98 kg)	1975–06–19	Bradley
SF	44	Leon Powe	6 ft 8 in (2.03 m)	240 lb (109 kg)	1984–01–22	California
PG	3	Sebastian Telfair	6 ft 0 in (1.83 m)	175 lb (79 kg)	1985–06–09	Lincoln HS (NY)
PF	17	Anderson Varejão	6 ft 11 in (2.11 m)	260 lb (118 kg)	1982–09–28	Brazil
SG	13	Delonte West	6 ft 3 in (1.91 m)	180 lb (82 kg)	1983–07–26	Saint Joseph's
PG	31	Jawad Williams	6 ft 9 in (2.06 m)	218 lb (99 kg)	1983–02–19	North Carolina
PG	2	Mo Williams	6 ft 1 in (1.85 m)	198 lb (90 kg)	1982–12–19	Alabama

Coaches
Head coach
- Mike Brown
Assistant(s)
- Hank Egan
- Melvin Hunt
- Chris Jent
- Michael Malone

Legend
- (DP) Unsigned draft pick
- (FA) Free agent
- (S) Suspended
- Injured

Roster
Updated: March 25, 2010

== Pre-season ==
2009 pre-season game log
October: 4–4 (home: 3–2; road: 1–2)

Game	Date	Team	Score	High points	High rebounds	High assists	Location Attendance	Record
1	October 6	Charlotte Bobcats	87 – 92				Quicken Loans Arena; 20,403	1-0 recap
2	October 10	@Charlotte Bobcats	102 – 96				North Charleston Coliseum; 11,489	2-0 recap
3	October 12	Olympiacos Piraeus (Greece)	94 – 111				Quicken Loans Arena; 19,791	3-0 recap
4	October 14	Washington Wizards	109 – 104				Quicken Loans Arena; 19,672	3-1 recap
5	October 16	@San Antonio Spurs	98 – 105				AT&T Center; 17,186	3-2 recap
6	October 17	@Dallas Mavericks	82 – 93				American Airlines Center; 18,525	3-3 recap
7	October 20	Dallas Mavericks	66 – 96				Petersen Events Center; 10,011	4-3 recap
8	October 21	Boston Celtics	96 – 82				Value City Arena; 18,021	4-4 recap

2009–10 pre-season schedule

== Regular season ==
=== Standings ===
Central Division	W	L	PCT	GB	Home	Road	Div
z-Cleveland Cavaliers	61	21	.744	–	35–6	26–15	12–4
x-Milwaukee Bucks	46	36	.561	15	28–13	18–23	10–6
x-Chicago Bulls	41	41	.500	20	24–17	17–24	10–6
Indiana Pacers	32	50	.390	29	23–18	9–32	6–10
Detroit Pistons	27	55	.329	34	17–24	10–31	2–14

#	Eastern Conference				
#	Team	W	L	PCT	GB
1	z-Cleveland Cavaliers	61	21	.744	–
2	y-Orlando Magic	59	23	.720	2
3	x-Atlanta Hawks	53	29	.646	8
4	y-Boston Celtics	50	32	.610	11
5	x-Miami Heat	47	35	.573	14
6	x-Milwaukee Bucks	46	36	.561	15
7	x-Charlotte Bobcats	44	38	.537	17
8	x-Chicago Bulls	41	41	.500	20
9	Toronto Raptors	40	42	.488	21
10	Indiana Pacers	32	50	.390	29
11	New York Knicks	29	53	.354	32
12	Philadelphia 76ers	27	55	.329	34
13	Detroit Pistons	27	55	.329	34
14	Washington Wizards	26	56	.317	35
15	New Jersey Nets	12	70	.146	49

=== Game log ===
2009–10 game log
Total: 61–21 (home: 35–6; road: 26–15)
October: 2–2 (home: 1–1; road: 1–1)

Game	Date	Team	Score	High points	High rebounds	High assists	Location Attendance	Record
1	October 27	Boston	L 89–95	LeBron James (38)	Shaquille O'Neal (10)	LeBron James (8)	Quicken Loans Arena; 20,562	0–1
2	October 28	@ Toronto	L 91–101	LeBron James (23)	LeBron James (11)	LeBron James (12)	Air Canada Centre; 20,152	0–2
3	October 30	@ Minnesota	W 104–87	LeBron James (24)	Anderson Varejão (11)	LeBron James, Mo Williams (6)	Target Center; 19,356	1–2
4	October 31	Charlotte	W 90–79	Mo Williams (24)	Anderson Varejão (8)	LeBron James (9)	Quicken Loans Arena; 20,562	2–2

November : 10–3 (home: 5–1; road: 5–2)

Game	Date	Team	Score	High points	High rebounds	High assists	Location Attendance	Record
5	November 3	Washington	W 102–90	LeBron James (27)	Anderson Varejão (10)	LeBron James, Mo Williams (6)	Quicken Loans Arena; 20,562	3–2
6	November 5	Chicago	L 85–86	LeBron James (25)	Anderson Varejão (13)	LeBron James, Mo Williams (6)	Quicken Loans Arena; 20,562	3–3
7	November 6	@ New York	W 100–91	LeBron James (33)	Anderson Varejão (14)	LeBron James (9)	Madison Square Garden; 19,763	4–3
8	November 11	@ Orlando	W 102–93	LeBron James (36)	LeBron James (8)	Mo Williams (6)	Amway Arena; 17,461	5–3
9	November 12	@ Miami	W 111–104	LeBron James (34)	Jamario Moon (6)	LeBron James (7)	American Airlines Arena; 19,600	6–3
10	November 14	Utah	W 107–103	LeBron James, Mo Williams (21)	LeBron James, Zydrunas Ilgauskas (6)	LeBron James (9)	Quicken Loans Arena; 20,562	7–3
11	November 17	Golden State	W 114–108	LeBron James (31)	J.J. Hickson (9)	LeBron James (12)	Quicken Loans Arena; 20,562	8–3
12	November 18	@ Washington	L 91–108	LeBron James (34)	Zydrunas Ilgauskas (9)	LeBron James (8)	Verizon Center; 20,173	8–4
13	November 20	@ Indiana	W 105–95	LeBron James (40)	Zydrunas Ilgauskas (11)	LeBron James (7)	Conseco Fieldhouse; 18,165	9–4
14	November 21	Philadelphia	W 97–91	LeBron James (32)	Zydrunas Ilgauskas (8)	LeBron James (9)	Quicken Loans Arena; 20,562	10–4
15	November 25	@ Detroit	W 98–88	LeBron James (34)	LeBron James, Anderson Varejão (8)	Mo Williams (8)	The Palace of Auburn Hills; 22,076	11–4
16	November 27	@ Charlotte	L 87–94	LeBron James (25)	Anderson Varejão (11)	Mo Williams (6)	Time Warner Cable Arena; 19,168	11–5
17	November 28	Dallas	W 111–95	LeBron James, Mo Williams (25)	Jamario Moon, Anderson Varejão (9)	LeBron James (12)	Quicken Loans Arena; 20,562	12–5

December : 14–3 (home: 7–0; road: 7–3)

Game	Date	Team	Score	High points	High rebounds	High assists	Location Attendance	Record
18	December 2	Phoenix	W 107–90	Zydrunas Ilgauskas (14)	Shaquille O'Neal (9)	LeBron James (10)	Quicken Loans Arena; 20,562	13–5
19	December 4	Chicago	W 101–87	LeBron James (23)	Zydrunas Ilgauskas, Shaquille O'Neal (7)	LeBron James (11)	Quicken Loans Arena; 20,562	14–5
20	December 6	@ Milwaukee	W 101–86	Delonte West (21)	Anderson Varejão (12)	LeBron James (10)	Bradley Center; 16,625	15–5
21	December 8	@ Memphis	L 109–111 (OT)	LeBron James (43)	LeBron James (13)	Mo Williams (8)	FedEx Forum; 16,325	15–6
22	December 9	@ Houston	L 85–95	LeBron James (27)	Shaquille O'Neal, J. J. Hickson (10)	LeBron James (7)	Toyota Center; 18,200	15–7
23	December 11	Portland	W 104–99	LeBron James (33)	Shaquille O'Neal (11)	Mo Williams (10)	Quicken Loans Arena; 20,562	16–7
24	December 13	@ Oklahoma City	W 102–89	LeBron James (44)	Anderson Varejão (10)	LeBron James (6)	Ford Center; 18,203	17–7
25	December 15	New Jersey	W 99–89	LeBron James (23)	Mo Williams, Jamario Moon (8)	LeBron James (7)	Quicken Loans Arena; 20,562	18–7
26	December 16	@ Philadelphia	W 108–101	LeBron James (36)	Shaquille O'Neal (9)	LeBron James (7)	Wachovia Center; 19,517	19–7
27	December 18	Milwaukee	W 85–82	LeBron James (26)	LeBron James (10)	LeBron James (8)	Quicken Loans Arena; 20,562	20–7
28	December 20	@ Dallas	L 95–102	LeBron James (25)	Anderson Varejão, Shaquille O'Neal (8)	LeBron James (6)	American Airlines Center; 20,346	20–8
29	December 21	@ Phoenix	W 109–91	LeBron James (29)	Mo Williams, LeBron James, J.J. Hickson (6)	Delonte West (6)	US Airways Center; 18,221	21–8
30	December 23	@ Sacramento	W 117–104 (OT)	LeBron James (34)	LeBron James (16)	LeBron James (10)	ARCO Arena; 16,407	22–8
31	December 25	@ L.A. Lakers	W 102–87	Mo Williams (28)	Anderson Varejão, Zydrunas Ilgauskas (9)	LeBron James (9)	Staples Center; 18,997	23–8
32	December 27	Houston	W 108–83	LeBron James (29)	Shaquille O'Neal (11)	LeBron James (6)	Quicken Loans Arena; 20,562	24–8
33	December 29	@ Atlanta	W 95–84	Mo Williams (20)	LeBron James, Anderson Varejão, Shaquille O'Neal (8)	LeBron James (10)	Philips Arena; 20,150	25–8
34	December 30	Atlanta	W 106–101	LeBron James (48)	LeBron James (10)	Mo Williams (10)	Quicken Loans Arena; 20,562	26–8

January : 12–3 (home: 6–1; road: 6–2)

Game	Date	Team	Score	High points	High rebounds	High assists	Location Attendance	Record
35	January 2	@ New Jersey	W 94–86	LeBron James (28)	Anderson Varejão (12)	LeBron James (7)	Izod Center; 17,569	27–8
36	January 3	Charlotte	L 88–91	LeBron James (29)	LeBron James, Shaquille O'Neal (7)	LeBron James, Mo Williams (6)	Quicken Loans Arena; 20,562	27–9
37	January 6	Washington	W 121–98	LeBron James (23)	Anderson Varejão, Zydrunas Ilgauskas (8)	LeBron James (8)	Quicken Loans Arena; 20,562	28–9
38	January 8	@ Denver	L 97–99	LeBron James (35)	Anderson Varejão (15)	LeBron James (7)	Pepsi Center; 19,996	28–10
39	January 10	@ Portland	W 106–94	LeBron James (41)	Shaquille O'Neal (11)	LeBron James (8)	Rose Garden Arena; 20,614	29–10
40	January 11	@ Golden State	W 117–114	LeBron James (37)	Anderson Varejão, Zydrunas Ilgauskas (9)	LeBron James (11)	Oracle Arena; 19,596	30–10
41	January 14	@ Utah	L 96–97	LeBron James (36)	LeBron James, Anderson Varejão (9)	LeBron James (6)	EnergySolutions Arena; 19,911	30–11
42	January 16	@ L.A. Clippers	W 102–101	LeBron James (32)	Anderson Varejão (9)	Mo Williams (6)	Staples Center; 19,277	31–11
43	January 19	Toronto	W 108–100	LeBron James (28)	LeBron James (9)	LeBron James (11)	Quicken Loans Arena; 20,562	32–11
44	January 21	L.A. Lakers	W 93–87	LeBron James (37)	J.J. Hickson (14)	LeBron James (9)	Quicken Loans Arena; 20,562	33–11
45	January 23	Oklahoma City	W 100–99	LeBron James (37)	LeBron James, J.J. Hickson (9)	LeBron James (12)	Quicken Loans Arena; 20,562	34–11
46	January 25	@ Miami	W 92–91	LeBron James (32)	Anderson Varejão (10)	LeBron James (4)	AmericanAirlines Arena; 19,600	35–11
47	January 27	Minnesota	W 109–95	J.J. Hickson (23)	Anderson Varejão (10)	LeBron James (11)	Quicken Loans Arena; 20,562	36–11
48	January 29	@ Indiana	W 92–91	LeBron James, Shaquille O'Neal (22)	LeBron James, Anderson Varejão (9)	LeBron James (13)	Conseco Fieldhouse; 18,165	37–11
49	January 31	L.A. Clippers	W 114–89	LeBron James (32)	Shaquille O'Neal (12)	LeBron James (11)	Quicken Loans Arena; 20,562	38–11

February : 8–3 (home: 6–1; road: 2–2)

Game	Date	Team	Score	High points	High rebounds	High assists	Location Attendance	Record
50	February 2	Memphis	W 105–89	LeBron James (22)	Shaquille O'Neal (13)	LeBron James (15)	Quicken Loans Arena; 20,562	39–11
51	February 4	Miami	W 102–86	LeBron James (36)	Shaquille O'Neal (8)	LeBron James (8)	Quicken Loans Arena; 20,562	40–11
52	February 6	New York	W 113–106	LeBron James (47)	LeBron James (8)	LeBron James (8)	Quicken Loans Arena; 20,562	41–11
53	February 9	New Jersey	W 104–97	LeBron James (32)	Anderson Varejão (9)	LeBron James (11)	Quicken Loans Arena; 20,562	42–11
54	February 11	Orlando	W 115–106	LeBron James (32)	LeBron James (8)	LeBron James (13)	Quicken Loans Arena; 20,562	43–11
All-Star Break
55	February 18	Denver	L 116–118	LeBron James (43)	LeBron James (13)	LeBron James (15)	Quicken Loans Arena; 20,562	43–12
56	February 19	@ Charlotte	L 93–110	LeBron James (22)	J.J. Hickson, Shaquille O'Neal, Antawn Jamison (7)	LeBron James (9)	Time Warner Cable Arena; 19,568	43–13
57	February 21	@ Orlando	L 95–101	LeBron James (33)	LeBron James (9)	LeBron James (6)	Amway Arena; 17,461	43–14
58	February 23	New Orleans	W 105–95	LeBron James, Shaquille O'Neal (20)	LeBron James (13)	Shaquille O'Neal, Anderson Varejão (7)	Quicken Loans Arena; 20,562	44–14
59	February 25	@ Boston	W 108–88	LeBron James (36)	Anderson Varejão (10)	LeBron James (9)	TD Garden; 18,624	45–14
60	February 26	@ Toronto	W 126–118 (OT)	LeBron James (36)	Antawn Jamison (11)	LeBron James (9)	Air Canada Centre; 20,107	46–14

March : 13–2 (home: 8–0; road: 5–2)

Game	Date	Team	Score	High points	High rebounds	High assists	Location Attendance	Record
61	March 1	New York	W 124–93	LeBron James (22)	Antawn Jamison (12)	Mo Williams (10)	Quicken Loans Arena; 20,562	47–14
62	March 3	@ New Jersey	W 111–92	LeBron James (26)	J. J. Hickson (13)	LeBron James (14)	Izod Center; 17,502	48–14
63	March 5	Detroit	W 99–92	LeBron James (40)	LeBron James (13)	Delonte West (7)	Quicken Loans Arena; 20,562	49–14
64	March 6	@ Milwaukee	L 85–92	Antawn Jamison (30)	Antawn Jamison (11)	Delonte West (6)	Bradley Center; 18,717	49–15
65	March 8	San Antonio	W 97–95	Antawn Jamison, Mo Williams (17)	Anderson Varejão (9)	Mo Williams (8)	Quicken Loans Arena; 20,562	50–15
66	March 12	@ Philadelphia	W 100–95	LeBron James (23)	Anderson Varejão (12)	LeBron James (10)	Wachovia Center; 20,433	51–15
67	March 14	Boston	W 104–93	LeBron James (30)	Antawn Jamison (12)	LeBron James (7)	Quicken Loans Arena; 20,562	52–15
68	March 16	@ Detroit	W 113–101	LeBron James (29)	LeBron James (12)	LeBron James (12)	The Palace of Auburn Hills; 22,076	53–15
69	March 17	Indiana	W 99–94	LeBron James (32)	LeBron James, Antawn Jamison (9)	LeBron James (9)	Quicken Loans Arena; 20,562	54–15
70	March 19	@ Chicago	W 92–85	LeBron James (29)	LeBron James (11)	LeBron James (7)	United Center; 23,129	55–15
71	March 21	Detroit	W 104–79	Leon Powe (16)	Anderson Varejão (9)	Mo Williams (8)	Quicken Loans Arena; 20,562	56–15
72	March 24	@ New Orleans	W 105–92	LeBron James (38)	Antawn Jamison (11)	LeBron James (9)	New Orleans Arena; 18,008	57–15
73	March 26	@ San Antonio	L 97–102	LeBron James (27)	Antawn Jamison (9)	LeBron James (10)	AT&T Center; 18,581	57–16
74	March 28	Sacramento	W 97–90	LeBron James (34)	Antawn Jamison (9)	LeBron James (8)	Quicken Loans Arena; 20,562	58–16
75	March 31	Milwaukee	W 101–98	LeBron James (23)	Antawn Jamison (12)	LeBron James (7)	Quicken Loans Arena; 20,562	59–16

April : 2–5 (home: 2–2; road: 0–3)

Game	Date	Team	Score	High points	High rebounds	High assists	Location Attendance	Record
76	April 2	Atlanta	W 93–88	LeBron James (27)	J. J. Hickson (16)	LeBron James (6)	Quicken Loans Arena; 20,562	60–16
77	April 4	@ Boston	L 113–117	LeBron James (42)	J. J. Hickson (11)	LeBron James (9)	TD Garden; 18,624	60–17
78	April 6	Toronto	W 113–101	Antawn Jamison (20)	Anthony Parker (8)	LeBron James (13)	Quicken Loans Arena; 20,562	61–17
79	April 8	@ Chicago	L 108–109	Mo Williams (35)	Antawn Jamison, Anthony Parker (6)	Mo Williams (10)	United Center; 21,707	61–18
80	April 9	Indiana	L 113–116	J. J. Hickson, Sebastian Telfair (21)	J. J. Hickson (10)	Delonte West (12)	Quicken Loans Arena; 20,562	61–19
81	April 11	Orlando	L 92–98	Delonte West (21)	Žydrūnas Ilgauskas (12)	Mo Williams (9)	Quicken Loans Arena; 20,562	61–20
82	April 14	@ Atlanta	L 83–99	Jamario Moon (15)	Jamario Moon (7)	Sebastian Telfair (5)	Philips Arena; 19,069	61–21

2009–10 season schedule

== Playoffs ==
2010 playoff game log
First Round: 4–1 (home: 3–0; road: 1–1)

Game	Date	Team	Score	High points	High rebounds	High assists	Location Attendance	Series
1	April 17	Chicago	W 96–83	LeBron James (24)	Anderson Varejão (15)	Mo Williams (10)	Quicken Loans Arena; 20,562	1–0
2	April 19	Chicago	W 112–102	LeBron James (40)	LeBron James (8)	LeBron James (8)	Quicken Loans Arena; 20,562	2–0
3	April 22	@ Chicago	L 106–108	LeBron James (39)	Antawn Jamison (11)	LeBron James (8)	United Center; 22,991	2–1
4	April 25	@ Chicago	W 121–98	LeBron James (37)	LeBron James (12)	LeBron James (11)	United Center; 22,991	3–1
5	April 27	Chicago	W 96–94	Antawn Jamison (25)	LeBron James (10)	LeBron James (9)	Quicken Loans Arena; 20,562	4–1

Conference Semifinals: 2–4 (home: 1–2; road: 1–2)

Game	Date	Team	Score	High points	High rebounds	High assists	Location Attendance	Series
1	May 1	Boston	W 101–93	LeBron James (35)	Antawn Jamison (9)	LeBron James (7)	Quicken Loans Arena; 20,562	1–0
2	May 3	Boston	L 86–104	LeBron James (24)	James, Varejão (7)	Mo Williams (7)	Quicken Loans Arena; 20,562	1–1
3	May 7	@ Boston	W 124–95	LeBron James (38)	Antawn Jamison (12)	James, Williams (7)	TD Garden; 18,624	2–1
4	May 9	@ Boston	L 87–97	LeBron James (22)	LeBron James (9)	LeBron James (8)	TD Garden; 18,624	2–2
5	May 11	Boston	L 88–120	Shaquille O'Neal (21)	Anderson Varejão (8)	LeBron James (7)	Quicken Loans Arena; 20,562	2–3
6	May 13	@ Boston	L 85–94	LeBron James (27)	LeBron James (19)	LeBron James (10)	TD Garden; 18,624	2–4

2010 schedule

== Player statistics ==
Legend
GP	Games played	GS	Games started	MPG	Minutes per game
FG%	Field-goal percentage	3P%	3-point field-goal percentage	FT%	Free-throw percentage
RPG	Rebounds per game	APG	Assists per game	SPG	Steals per game
BPG	Blocks per game	PPG	Points per game

=== Regular season ===
Player	GP	GS	MPG	FG%	3P%	FT%	RPG	APG	SPG	BPG	PPG
Daniel Gibson	56	10	19.1	.466	.477	.694	1.3	1.3	.4	.1	6.3
Danny Green	20	0	5.8	.385	.273	.667	.9	.3	.3	.2	2.0
J. J. Hickson	81	73	20.9	.554	.000	.681	4.9	.5	.4	.5	8.5
Žydrūnas Ilgauskas	64	6	20.9	.443	.478	.743	5.4	.8	.2	.8	7.4
LeBron James	76	76	39.0	.503	.333	.767	7.3	8.6	1.6	1.0	29.7
Cedric Jackson^{1}	5	0	2.0	.000	.000	.250	.2	.4	.0	.0	.2
Darnell Jackson	27	0	4.2	.320	.333	.667	.7	.1	.1	.1	.8
Antawn Jamison^{1}	25	23	32.4	.485	.342	.506	7.7	1.3	1.1	.5	15.8
Coby Karl	3	0	1.7	.	.	.	.7	.0	.0	.0	.0
Jamario Moon	61	2	17.2	.462	.320	.800	3.1	.5	.3	.2	4.9
Shaquille O'Neal	53	53	23.4	.566	.000	.496	6.7	1.5	.3	1.2	12.0
Anthony Parker	81	81	27.5	.434	.414	.789	2.9	1.9	0.8	.2	7.3
Leon Powe	20	2	11.8	.429	.000	.587	3.0	.0	.3	.1	4.0
Sebastian Telfair^{1}	4	0	19.3	.457	.222	.833	1.0	3.0	.5	.0	9.8
Anderson Varejão	76	7	28.5	.572	.200	.663	7.6	1.1	.9	.9	8.6
Delonte West	60	3	25.0	.445	.325	.810	2.8	3.3	0.9	.5	8.8
Jawad Williams	54	6	13.7	.393	.323	.711	1.5	.6	.2	.1	4.1
Mo Williams	69	68	34.2	.442	.429	.894	3.0	5.3	1.0	.3	15.8

Stats with the Cavaliers
^{1}Did not start or finish the season with the Cavs.

=== Playoffs ===
Player	GP	GS	MPG	FG%	3P%	FT%	RPG	APG	SPG	BPG	PPG
Daniel Gibson	5	0	4.6	.286	.250	1.000	.6	.2	.0	.0	1.4
J. J. Hickson	11	0	7.2	.626	.000	.688	.8	.1	.0	.0	3.5
Žydrūnas Ilgauskas	6	0	9.0	.364	.000	.667	1.8	.3	.0	1.0	1.7
LeBron James	11	11	41.8	.502	.400	.733	9.3	7.6	1.7	1.8	29.1
Antawn Jamison	11	11	34.1	.467	.256	.732	7.4	1.3	.6	1.0	15.3
Jamario Moon	11	0	10.3	.583	.500	.667	1.5	.5	.4	.4	3.5
Shaquille O'Neal	11	11	22.1	.516	.000	.660	5.5	1.4	0.2	1.2	11.5
Anthony Parker	11	11	30.1	.436	.455	.733	2.4	1.3	.8	.3	8.3
Leon Powe	3	0	3.0	.250	.000	.750	.7	.0	.0	.0	1.7
Sebastian Telfair	0	0	0	.000	.000	.000	.0	.0	.0	.0	0
Anderson Varejão	11	0	23.2	.417	.000	.742	6.5	.6	1.0	.8	5.7
Delonte West	11	0	24.5	.418	.158	.938	1.9	2.6	.8	.9	6.7
Mo Williams	11	11	37.4	.409	.327	.804	3.1	5.4	.6	.2	14.4

== Awards, Records and Milestones ==
=== Awards ===
- LeBron James – NBA Most Valuable Player (2x)
- LeBron James – All-NBA First Team (4x)
- LeBron James – NBA All-Defensive First Team (2x)
- Anderson Varejão – NBA All-Defensive Second Team (1x)

==== Week/Month ====
- LeBron James – Player of the Week (6x)
- LeBron James – Player of the Month (4x)
- Mike Brown – Coach of the Month (December)

==== All-Star ====
- LeBron James – NBA All-Star Game Selection (6x)

=== Records ===
- December 2, 2009: Zydrunas Ilgauskas set the record for most games played as a Cavalier with 771 and moved into third place on the Cavaliers' all-time scoring list behind LeBron James and Brad Daugherty.
- On March 19, 2010, LeBron James set a record as the youngest player in NBA history to record 15,000 career points.
- At the end of the season, LeBron James was the all-time scoring leader of the Cavs, with 15,251 points.

=== Team Records ===
- On May 11, the Cavaliers suffered their worst playoffs defeat, against the Boston Celtics, by a margin of 32 points, 88–120.
- On December 23, the Cavaliers set a franchise record and tied with the NBA record of fewest points allowed in an OT period, against Sacramento Kings.

=== Milestones ===
- Daniel Gibson reached 200 career games and 5,000 minutes.*
- Danny Green played his first season in the NBA.*
- J.J. Hickson reached 100 career games and 2,000 minutes.*
- Zydrunas Ilgauskas reached 21,000 minutes and 4,000 field goals made.*
- LeBron James reached 15,000 career points, 500 career games, 22,000 minutes, 5,000 field goals made, 11,000 field goals attempted, 2,000 three-point shots attempted, 3,000 defensives rebounds, 1,000 fouls and 2,000 Playoffs points.*
- Cedric Jackson played his first season in the NBA.*
- Antawn Jamison reached 17,000 career points and 31,000 minutes.
- Jamario Moon reached 200 career games, 5,000 minutes and 1,000 rebounds.
- Shaquille O'Neal reached 41,000 minutes, 11,000 field goals made, 19,000 field goals attempted, 11,000 free-throws attempted, 3,000 assists and 4,000 fouls.
- Anthony Parker reached 300 career games, 10,000 minutes, 1,000 three-point shots attempted, 1,000 defensives rebounds, 1,000 rebounds and 3,000 career points.
- Leon Powe reached 200 career games.
- Anderson Varejão reached 9,000 minutes, 1,000 field goals made, 2,000 field goals attempted, 1,000 free throws attempted and 1,000 fouls.*
- Delonte West reached 10,000 minutes, 3,000 field goals attempted and 1,000 rebounds.
- Mo Williams reached 14,000 minutes, 5,000 field goals attempted, 1,000 free-throws attempted, 2,000 assists, 1,000 turnovers and 6,000 points.

*Spent the entire NBA Career with the Cleveland Cavaliers, until reach these Milestones.

=== Team Milestones ===
- On December 30, the Cavs reached 3,200 regular seasons games, against the Atlanta Hawks.
- On February 4, the Cavs reached 1,500 regular seasons victories against the Miami Heat.
- On April 14, the Cavs reached 1,800 combined regular and post-seasons defeats, against the Atlanta Hawks
- On May 7, the Cavs reached 70 post-season wins, against the Boston Celtics.
- The Cavaliers reached 30 playoff series, against the Boston Celtics.

== Injuries, Surgeries, and Absences ==
- Leon Powe – Knee surgery (before arriving Cleveland)
- Jamario Moon – Abdominal (Side) Injury
- Mo Williams – Left Shoulder Injury
- Anderson Varejão – Left Hamstring Injury
- Shaquille O'Neal – Right Thumb Surgery
- LeBron James – Right Elbow Injury

== Transactions ==
=== Free agents ===
==== Additions ====
Date	Player	Signed	Former Team
July 13, 2009	Anthony Parker	Free agent	Toronto Raptors
July 17, 2009	Jamario Moon	Free agent	Miami Heat
August 12, 2009	Leon Powe	Free agent	Boston Celtics
October 22, 2009	Coby Karl	Free agent	Joventut Badalona

==== Subtractions ====
Date	Player	Reason Left	New Team
August 25, 2009	Tarence Kinsey	Free agent	Fenerbahçe Ülker
March 23, 2010	Darnell Jackson	Waived	Milwaukee Bucks

=== Trades ===
June 25, 2009
To Cleveland Cavaliers----
- (United States) Shaquille O'Neal
To Phoenix Suns----
- (Serbia) Aleksandar Pavlović
- (United States) Ben Wallace
- $500,000
- 2010 Second-Round Draft Pick
February 17, 2010
To Cleveland Cavaliers----
- (United States) Antawn Jamison
To Washington Wizards----
- (Lithuania) Zydrunas Ilgauskas
- (Turkey) Emir Preldžič
- 2010 First-Round Draft Pick
February 17, 2010
To Cleveland Cavaliers----
- (United States) Sebastian Telfair
To Los Angeles Clippers----

On February 17, the Cavaliers completed a three-team trade with the Washington Wizards and the Los Angeles Clippers, acquiring Antawn Jamison from Washington and Sebastian Telfair from L.A. The Cavs sent Zydrunas Ilgauskas to the Wizards, plus a first round draft pick in 2010 and the rights to Emir Preldžić.

On March 23, the Cavaliers re-signed Ilgauskas for the remainder of the season after his contract was bought out by the Wizards. The Cavaliers also waived Darnell Jackson to make room on the roster.
