= Chris Richard (basketball) =

American basketball player (born 1984)

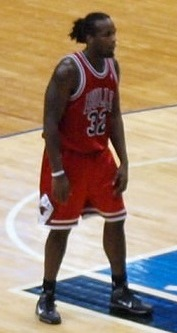

Personal information
- Born: December 25, 1984 (age 41) Lakeland, Florida, U.S.
- Listed height: 6 ft 9 in (2.06 m)
- Listed weight: 255 lb (116 kg)

Career information
- High school: Kathleen (Lakeland, Florida)
- College: Florida (2003–2007)
- NBA draft: 2007: 2nd round, 41st overall pick
- Drafted by: Minnesota Timberwolves
- Playing career: 2007–2011
- Position: Power forward / center
- Number: 32, 35

Career history
- 2007–2008: Minnesota Timberwolves
- 2008: →Sioux Falls Skyforce
- 2008–2010: Tulsa 66ers
- 2010: Chicago Bulls
- 2010–2011: Liaoning Dinosaurs

Career highlights
- 2× NCAA champion (2006, 2007); Florida Mr. Basketball (2003)
- Stats at NBA.com
- Stats at Basketball Reference

Chris Richard (born December 25, 1984) is an American former professional basketball player. Richard, a power forward, played college basketball for the Florida Gators. He has a wingspan of 7'4½". His role was that of the sixth man that came off the bench for the Florida Gators national championship men's team during the 2006–07 season. He is a former Mr. Basketball in the state of Florida (2002) and scored 8 points to go along with 8 rebounds (5 offensive) in his final game of his college career. He was taken 1st overall in 2008 D-League draft by the Tulsa 66ers.

In the 2007–08 NBA season, Richard played 52 games with the Minnesota Timberwolves. Richard signed with the Chicago Bulls during the 2009–10 NBA season. He played 18 regular season games, and was waived on June 30, 2010.

== NBA career statistics ==
Legend
GP	Games played	GS	Games started	MPG	Minutes per game
FG%	Field goal percentage	3P%	3-point field goal percentage	FT%	Free throw percentage
RPG	Rebounds per game	APG	Assists per game	SPG	Steals per game
BPG	Blocks per game	PPG	Points per game	**Bold**	Career high

=== Regular season ===
Year	Team	GP	GS	MPG	FG%	3P%	FT%	RPG	APG	SPG	BPG	PPG
2007–08	Minnesota	**52**	**3**	10.7	.471	.000	.593	2.6	.3	.2	**.2**	1.9
2009–10	Chicago	18	0	**12.4**	**.517**	.000	**.636**	**3.3**	**.4**	**.4**	**.2**	**2.1**
Career		70	3	11.1	.4u3	.000	.605	2.8	.4	.3	.2	1.9

=== Playoffs ===
Year	Team	GP	GS	MPG	FG%	3P%	FT%	RPG	APG	SPG	BPG	PPG
2010	Chicago	2	0	2.5	.000	.000	.000	1.5	.0	.0	.0	.0
Career		2	0	2.5	.000	.000	.000	1.5	.0	.0	.0	.0

== See also ==
- List of Florida Gators in the NBA
