= Martell Webster =

American basketball player (born 1986)

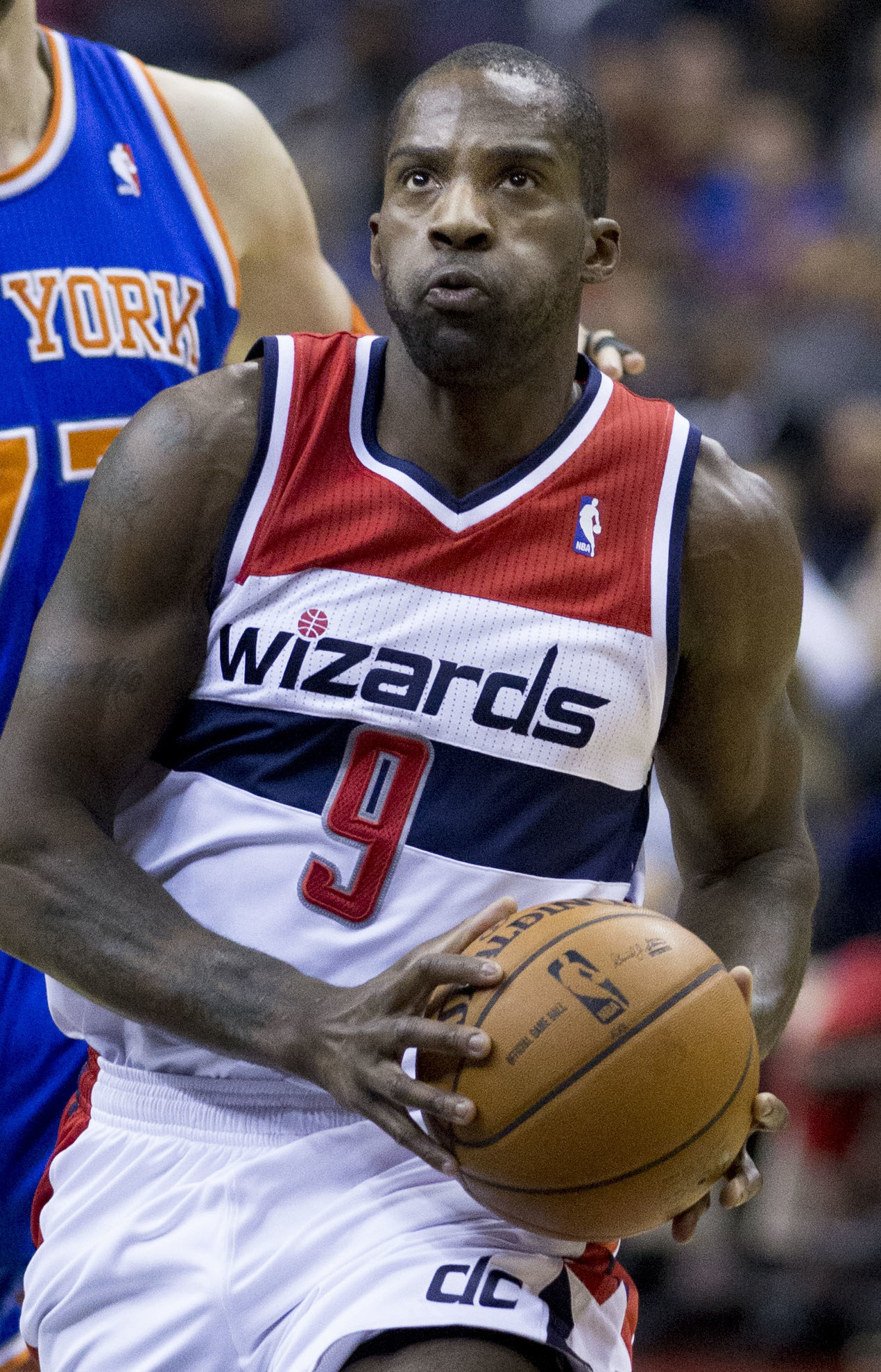
- Webster with the Washington Wizards in 2013

Personal information
- Born: December 4, 1986 (age 39) Edmonds, Washington, U.S.
- Listed height: 6 ft 7 in (2.01 m)
- Listed weight: 230 lb (104 kg)

Career information
- High school: Seattle Preparatory School (Seattle, Washington)
- NBA draft: 2005: 1st round, 6th overall pick
- Drafted by: Portland Trail Blazers
- Playing career: 2005–2015
- Position: Small forward / shooting guard
- Number: 8, 23, 5, 9

Career history
- 2005–2010: Portland Trail Blazers
- 2006: →Fort Worth Flyers
- 2010–2012: Minnesota Timberwolves
- 2012–2015: Washington Wizards

Career highlights
- First-team Parade All-American (2005); McDonald's All-American (2005)

Career statistics
- Points: (8.7 ppg)
- Rebounds: (3.1 rpg)
- Assists: (1.0 apg)
- Stats at NBA.com
- Stats at Basketball Reference

Martell Webster (born December 4, 1986) is an American former professional basketball player who played ten seasons in the National Basketball Association (NBA). The sixth player taken in the 2005 NBA draft, Webster played for Portland, Minnesota and Washington between 2005 and 2015. His best season came in 2012–13 when he started 62 games for the Wizards and averaged 11.4 points per game.

== High school career ==
Considered a five-star recruit by Rivals.com, Webster was listed as the No. 4 shooting guard and the No. 5 player in the nation in 2005. He had made a commitment to the University of Washington, but opted to go prep-to-pro.

== Professional career ==
=== Portland Trail Blazers (2005–2010) ===
Webster was selected by the Blazers with the sixth pick in the 2005 NBA draft after the Blazers' traded their third pick to the Utah Jazz just hours before the draft. He was assigned to the Fort Worth Flyers of the NBA Development League by the Blazers in January 2006, and in doing so became highest-drafted player (6th overall) to be assigned to the D-League until Hasheem Thabeet. He later returned to the Portland Trail Blazers in February 2006. He scored a season-high 26 points in a January 5, 2008, win over the Utah Jazz, with 24 of them scored in the third quarter. He is one of the last-ever high school players to be chosen in an NBA draft due to new draft eligibility rules introduced in 2006. In October 2008, Webster signed a four-year, $20 million contract extension.

On February 20, 2009, it was announced by Trail Blazers athletic trainer Jay Jensen that Webster would likely miss the rest of the 2008–09 NBA season with a left foot injury, having only played 5 minutes during the season.

On January 23, 2010, he scored a season-high 28 points in a win against the Detroit Pistons.

=== Minnesota Timberwolves (2010–2012) ===
Webster was traded on June 24, 2010, to the Minnesota Timberwolves in exchange for Ryan Gomes and the rights to draft pick Luke Babbitt.

Webster underwent back surgery in October 2010 and missed nearly half the 2010–11 NBA season, leading Timberwolves general manager David Kahn to charge the Trail Blazers with failure to adequately disclose a known injury. Another back surgery followed in September 2011, limiting Webster to just 47 games for the Wolves in the 2011–12 season. In spring 2013 Kahn's complaint was reportedly settled by the Blazers for $1.5 million just before the matter was brought to a formal hearing before the NBA. It was said to be among the largest cash settlements in such a case. Both teams were sworn to secrecy about the exact terms of the deal, according to basketball journalist Henry Abbott of ESPN.

On July 13, 2012, Webster was waived by the Timberwolves.

=== Washington Wizards (2012–2015) ===
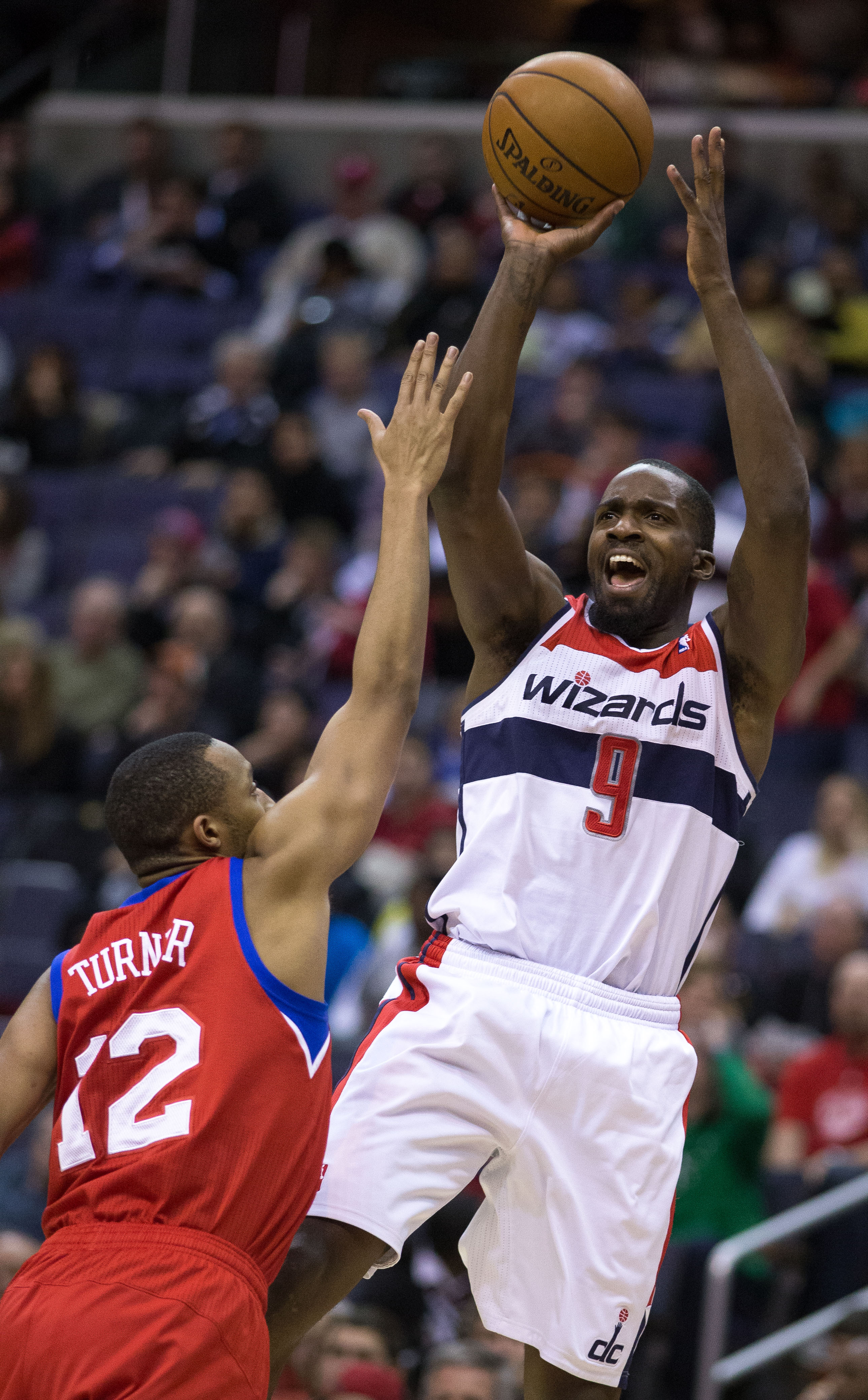
Webster shooting a jumpshot over Evan Turner, 2013

Webster signed with the Washington Wizards on August 29, 2012, on a one-year, $1.6 million contract. On March 16, 2013, Webster scored a career-high 34 points in a win over the Phoenix Suns, also tying another career high with seven three-pointers.

On July 10, 2013, Webster re-signed with the Wizards. In 2014–15, Webster missed the first 30 games of the season after he underwent surgery in June 2014 to repair a herniated disk in his lower back. He was ruled out for three to five months, as he returned to action on December 30, 2014, against the Dallas Mavericks.

On November 20, 2015, Webster was ruled out for the 2015–16 season after undergoing successful surgery to repair the labrum and damaged cartilage in his right hip. He was subsequently waived by the Wizards ten days later.

=== Retirement ===
On September 25, 2017, Webster was added to the New Orleans Pelicans' training camp roster. However, five days later, he decided to leave training camp and retire from basketball.

== NBA career statistics ==
Legend
GP	Games played	GS	Games started	MPG	Minutes per game
FG%	Field goal percentage	3P%	3-point field goal percentage	FT%	Free throw percentage
RPG	Rebounds per game	APG	Assists per game	SPG	Steals per game
BPG	Blocks per game	PPG	Points per game	**Bold**	Career high
*	Led the league

=== Regular season ===
Year	Team	GP	GS	MPG	FG%	3P%	FT%	RPG	APG	SPG	BPG	PPG
2005–06	Portland	61	18	17.5	.399	.357	**.859**	2.1	.6	.3	.2	6.6
2006–07	Portland	**82***	27	21.5	.396	.364	.705	2.9	.6	.4	.2	7.0
2007–08	Portland	75	**70**	28.4	.422	.388	.735	**3.9**	1.2	.6	.4	10.7
2008–09	Portland	1	0	5.0	.000	.000	.000	.0	.0	.0	.0	.0
2009–10	Portland	**82***	49	24.5	.405	.373	.813	3.3	.8	.5	**.5**	9.4
2010–11	Minnesota	46	1	23.8	**.447**	.417	.770	3.2	1.2	.6	.2	9.8
2011–12	Minnesota	47	26	24.3	.423	.339	.792	3.6	.9	**.7**	.4	6.9
2012–13	Washington	76	62	**28.9**	.442	**.422**	.848	**3.9**	**1.9**	.6	.2	**11.4**
2013–14	Washington	78	13	27.7	.433	.392	.840	2.8	1.2	.5	.2	9.7
2014–15	Washington	32	0	11.0	.264	.233	.750	1.4	.5	.2	.0	3.3
Career		580	266	24.0	.418	.382	.791	3.1	1.0	.5	.3	8.7

=== Playoffs ===
Year	Team	GP	GS	MPG	FG%	3P%	FT%	RPG	APG	SPG	BPG	PPG
2010	Portland	6	0	**25.3**	**.423**	**.294**	.556	**4.3**	**0.7**	**0.8**	**0.5**	**9.8**
2014	Washington	**11**	0	17.7	.366	.231	**.667**	2.3	0.5	0.4	0.5	3.8
Career		17	0	20.4	.398	.256	.593	3.0	0.5	0.5	0.5	5.9

== Personal life ==
Webster's mother, Cora McGuirk, disappeared in 1990, when he was four years old. Although her body was never found, Gary Ridgway, known as the "Green River Killer", a serial killer who murdered dozens of women and girls in Washington during the 1980s and 1990s, is thought to be responsible for killing her.

His cousin is former NBA veteran Jason Terry.

In 2015, Webster co-founded EYRST, an independent record label focusing on hip hop, based in Portland, Oregon. He released his first mixtape, ARTT, on July 14, 2016, and his first EP on August 12, 2016, entitled Emerald District, which was produced by Seattle hip hop producer Jake One.
