= Eric Maynor =

American basketball player (born 1987)

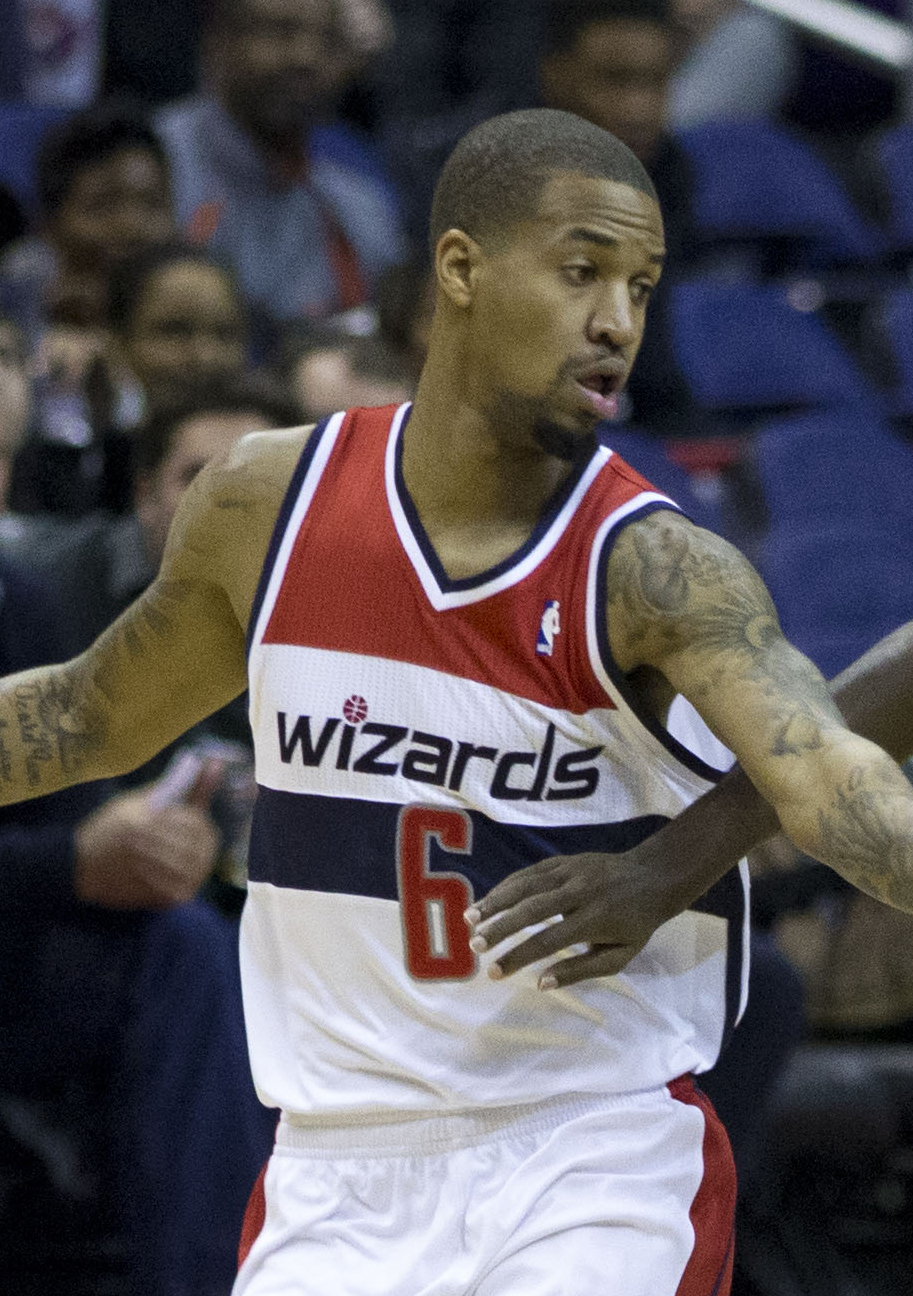
- Maynor with the Washington Wizards in 2013

Oklahoma City Thunder
- Title: Assistant coach
- League: NBA

Personal information
- Born: June 11, 1987 (age 39) Raeford, North Carolina, U.S.
- Listed height: 6 ft 3 in (1.91 m)
- Listed weight: 175 lb (79 kg)

Career information
- High school: Hoke County (Raeford, North Carolina); Westover (Fayetteville, North Carolina)
- College: VCU (2005–2009)
- NBA draft: 2009: 1st round, 20th overall pick
- Drafted by: Utah Jazz
- Playing career: 2009–2018
- Position: Point guard
- Number: 3, 6, 11
- Coaching career: 2019–present

Career history

Playing
- 2009: Utah Jazz
- 2009–2013: Oklahoma City Thunder
- 2013: Portland Trail Blazers
- 2013–2014: Washington Wizards
- 2014: Philadelphia 76ers
- 2015: Varese
- 2015–2016: Nizhny Novgorod
- 2016–2017: Varese
- 2017–2018: Orlandina

Coaching
- 2019–2021: Oklahoma City Blue (assistant)
- 2021–present: Oklahoma City Thunder (player development)

Career highlights
- As assistant coach: NBA champion (2025); As player: 2× CAA Player of the Year (2008, 2009); 3× First-team All-CAA (2007–2009); No. 3 jersey retired by VCU Rams
- Stats at NBA.com
- Stats at Basketball Reference

Eric Demarqua Maynor (born June 11, 1987) is an American former professional basketball player and current assistant coach for the Oklahoma City Thunder of the National Basketball Association. He played college basketball for Virginia Commonwealth University. As a senior, he averaged 22.4 points, 6.2 assists, 3.6 rebounds and 1.7 steals per game in the 2008–09 season.

Maynor was drafted by the Utah Jazz of the NBA in 2009. He has also played for the Oklahoma City Thunder, Portland Trail Blazers, Washington Wizards and Philadelphia 76ers.

== Early years ==
Eric Demarqua Maynor was born June 11, 1987, in Raeford, North Carolina, the third of four children of George Maynor and Barbara Robinson. Maynor's father was a former collegiate basketball player at East Carolina University and was a fourth-round selection of the Chicago Bulls in the 1979 NBA draft.

== High school career ==
Maynor began at Hoke County High School in Raeford, then transferred to Westover High School in neighboring Fayetteville for his senior year to play alongside his friend and AAU teammate De'shaune Griffin. Maynor led the team to the North Carolina state championship game, scoring 25 points in a loss to North Mecklenburg High School on March 14, 2005. For his outstanding performance during the season Maynor was named to the 2004/05 North Carolina All State Basketball team by the sports website NCPreps.com.

== College career ==
Eric Maynor was a four-year player in the men's basketball program at Virginia Commonwealth University (VCU). He graduated from VCU with a degree in Sports Management.

=== Freshman season (2005–06) ===
Maynor played in 29 games as a freshman at VCU, cracking the team's starting lineup by the end of the season. Maynor averaged 4.7 points and 2.2 assists in an average of 15.7 minutes per game during this first collegiate campaign.

=== Sophomore season (2006–07) ===
On March 15, 2007, Maynor scored 22 points, including the game-winning shot, in VCU's victory over Duke in the first round of the 2007 NCAA Division I men's basketball tournament. Maynor's last-minute heroics are also what helped VCU to overcome George Mason in the 2007 Colonial Athletic Association (CAA) championship game.

Over the summer of 2007, Maynor was selected to represent the United States in the Pan American Games, alongside D. J. White and Michael Beasley. Maynor was only able to play two games for the American Pan-Am team, however, before he was forced from further action by a hip injury. Maynor was also named one of the 50 pre-season candidates for the men's 2007–08 John R. Wooden Award, the nation's most prestigious college basketball honor.

=== Junior season (2007–08) ===
Maynor helped VCU win the CAA regular-season title, though the team fell in the semi-finals of the conference tournament to William & Mary. He was selected as the CAA Player of the Year and selected to the All-CAA first team. The Rams failed to reach the NCAA Tournament and went on to play in the NIT, where they lost in the first round against the University of Alabama at Birmingham.

=== Senior season (2008–09) ===
During the 2008–09 season, Eric Maynor became VCU's all-time leader in assists and in made free throws. On February 28, 2009, Maynor became the leading scorer in VCU history with a floater against Georgia State. As of March 10, 2009, he had scored a school record 1,929 points. Maynor also led VCU to a second CAA title during his career, scoring 25 points in a 71–50 victory over George Mason on March 9, 2009, at the Richmond Coliseum. The Rams went on to the 2009 NCAA Tournament but lost to UCLA when Maynor missed a buzzer-beater to win the game.

== Professional career ==
=== NBA ===
==== Utah Jazz (2009) ====
Maynor was drafted 20th overall by the Utah Jazz in the 2009 NBA draft. He became the first VCU player ever selected in the first round of the NBA draft.

Maynor signed a two-year contract with the Jazz on July 1, 2009, and made $1.3 million in his rookie season. Although he was to back up Deron Williams, Maynor had a positive outlook on the situation. When asked in an interview with RealCollegeBasketball.com what he thought about coming off the bench in Utah, Maynor replied, "Feel real good about it... I'm getting a chance to learn from some of the best".

==== Oklahoma City Thunder (2009–2013) ====
On December 22, 2009, Maynor, along with Matt Harpring, was traded to the Oklahoma City Thunder for the rights to Peter Fehse. According to a statement made by Jazz general manager Kevin O'Connor at the time of the deal, the trade of Maynor along with the $6.5 million contract of the injured power forward Harpring was made for financial reasons, in an effort to reduce the team's liability under the NBA's punitive "luxury tax" on teams with excessive salaries.

"Trading Eric was a difficult decision," O'Connor acknowledged, while noting that the team remained strong at the point guard position with star Deron Williams and Ronnie Price as a capable and proven reserve player.

Maynor wound up as the backup point guard on the young Thunder team behind the emerging superstar Russell Westbrook, drafted by the franchise as the #4 overall pick one year prior to Maynor coming into the NBA.

On January 7, 2012, the Thunder reported that Maynor had torn his right anterior cruciate ligament (ACL) in the fourth quarter of Oklahoma City's 98–95 win over the Houston Rockets and would miss the remainder of the season. Without Maynor the Thunder reached the 2012 NBA Finals, but lost in five games to the Miami Heat.

==== Portland Trail Blazers (2013) ====
In a deal concluded just 30 minutes before the noon trade deadline on February 21, 2013, Maynor was traded to the Portland Trail Blazers for the NBA rights to Georgios Printezis. Maynor was averaging just 2.8 points and 2.0 assists in an average of about 10.6 minutes per game playing for the Thunder and had fallen to number three on the team's depth chart for point guards, with second-year player Reggie Jackson emerging to capture most of the team's backup PG minutes. The Blazers were forced to waive reserve point guard Ronnie Price to make room on the team's 15-man roster for Maynor.

Portland general manager Neil Olshey was effusive about Maynor's style of play and his fit for the club, calling Maynor "a great guy to run our second unit while being able to play with our starters." Olshey noted that Maynor was known for making excellent decisions with the basketball while playing at a steady and reliable pace and offered the possibility that Maynor might potentially share time in the backcourt with Blazer rookie star Damian Lillard.

Olshey expressed hope that Maynor would mesh well with the team and make a solid long-term addition to the roster, declaring:

"You don't make moves just for 28 games, but clearly there's going to be an evaluation curve for us where we're going to have to evaluate Eric, see how he fits in with our team, our style of play, our culture.... We'll see what kind of opportunities present themselves."

==== Washington Wizards (2013–2014) ====
On July 10, 2013, Maynor signed with the Washington Wizards.

==== Philadelphia 76ers (2014) ====
On February 20, 2014, Maynor was traded to the Philadelphia 76ers in a three-team trade involving the Nuggets and the Wizards. On March 17, 2014, he was waived by the 76ers.

=== Europe ===
On January 14, 2015, Maynor signed a contract with Pallacanestro Varese of Italy for the rest of the 2014–15 Lega Basket Serie A season.

On July 23, 2015, he signed a one-year contract with the Russian club Nizhny Novgorod.

On July 27, 2016, Maynor returned to Pallacanestro Varese, signing a contract for the 2016–17 season.

On November 20, 2017, Maynor signed with Italian club Orlandina Basket for the rest of the 2017–18 season.

=== The Basketball Tournament ===
In 2017, Maynor participated in The Basketball Tournament for Ram Nation, a team of VCU alumni. Maynor averaged 13.5 PPG, 7.3 APG, and 5.5 RPG to help Ram Nation reach the Elite 8. In the Elite 8, Ram Nation lost a close game to the eventual tournament champs, Overseas Elite. The Basketball Tournament is an annual $2 million winner-take-all tournament broadcast on ESPN.

== Coaching career ==
In September 2019, Maynor was named assistant coach of the Oklahoma City Blue.

In August 2021, Maynor was moved from the Blue staff to the Thunder as a player development coach.

== NBA career statistics ==
Legend
GP	Games played	GS	Games started	MPG	Minutes per game
FG%	Field goal percentage	3P%	3-point field goal percentage	FT%	Free throw percentage
RPG	Rebounds per game	APG	Assists per game	SPG	Steals per game
BPG	Blocks per game	PPG	Points per game	**Bold**	Career high

=== Regular season ===
Year	Team	GP	GS	MPG	FG%	3P%	FT%	RPG	APG	SPG	BPG	PPG
2009–10	Utah	26	**2**	14.0	.391	.208	.758	1.5	3.1	.5	.1	5.2
2009–10	Oklahoma City	55	0	16.5	**.434**	.362	.692	1.7	3.4	.5	.1	4.5
2010–11	Oklahoma City	**82**	0	14.6	.402	**.385**	.729	1.5	2.9	.4	.1	4.2
2011–12	Oklahoma City	9	0	15.2	.359	.353	**1.000**	1.4	2.4	**.6**	.0	4.2
2012–13	Oklahoma City	37	0	10.6	.313	.326	.810	.5	2.0	.3	.0	2.8
2012–13	Portland	27	0	**21.2**	.422	.380	.683	1.0	**4.0**	.4	.0	**6.9**
2013–14	Washington	23	0	9.3	.292	.320	.667	1.0	1.7	.2	.0	2.3
2013–14	Philadelphia	8	0	14.0	.379	.333	.500	**1.9**	1.5	.5	**.3**	3.8
Career		267	2	14.6	.392	.350	.721	1.3	2.8	.4	.1	4.3

=== Playoffs ===
Year	Team	GP	GS	MPG	FG%	3P%	FT%	RPG	APG	SPG	BPG	PPG
2010	Oklahoma City	6	0	12.7	.300	.167	**.818**	**1.5**	1.5	.2	**.2**	3.7
2011	Oklahoma City	**17**	0	**12.9**	**.377**	**.360**	.789	1.3	**2.2**	**.5**	.0	**4.8**
Career		23	0	12.9	.361	.323	.800	1.3	2.0	.4	.0	4.5
