= Kevin Ollie =

American basketball player and coach (born 1972)

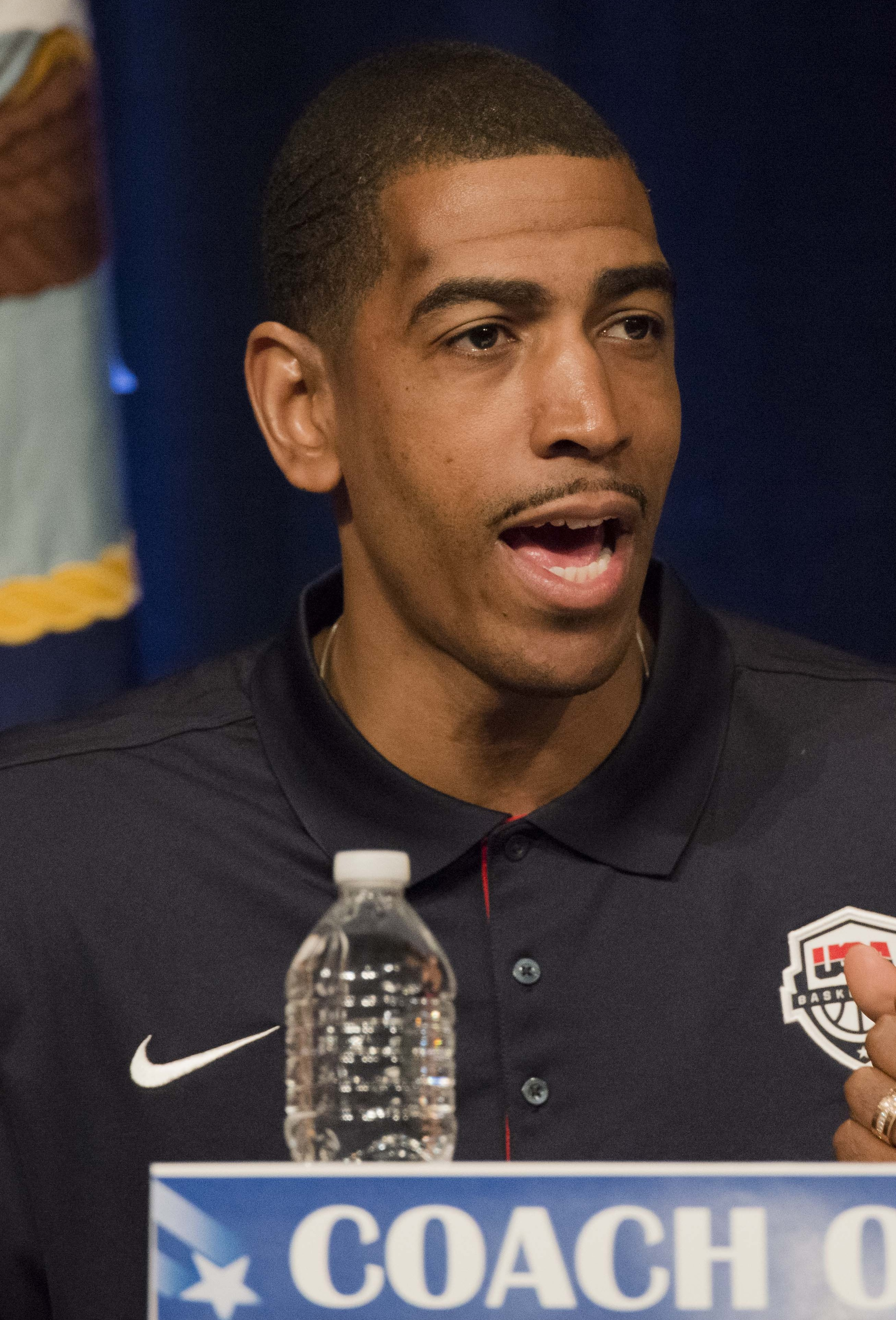
- Ollie in 2014

Personal information
- Born: December 27, 1972 (age 53) Dallas, Texas, U.S.
- Listed height: 6 ft 2 in (1.88 m)
- Listed weight: 195 lb (88 kg)

Career information
- High school: Crenshaw (Los Angeles, California)
- College: UConn (1991–1995)
- NBA draft: 1995: undrafted
- Playing career: 1995–2010
- Position: Point guard
- Number: 3, 15, 5, 2, 12, 8, 7
- Coaching career: 2012–present

Career history

Playing
- 1995–1997: Connecticut Pride
- 1997: Dallas Mavericks
- 1998: Orlando Magic
- 1999: Sacramento Kings
- 1999: Orlando Magic
- 1999–2000: Philadelphia 76ers
- 2000: New Jersey Nets
- 2000–2001: Philadelphia 76ers
- 2001–2002: Chicago Bulls
- 2002: Indiana Pacers
- 2002–2003: Milwaukee Bucks
- 2003: Seattle SuperSonics
- 2003–2004: Cleveland Cavaliers
- 2004–2008: Philadelphia 76ers
- 2008–2009: Minnesota Timberwolves
- 2009–2010: Oklahoma City Thunder

Career highlights
- As player: Third-team All-Big East (1995); As coach: NCAA champion (2014); NCAA Division I Regional – Final Four appearance (2014); AAC tournament champion (2016); Ben Jobe Award (2013)

Career NBA statistics
- Points: 2,496 (3.8 ppg)
- Rebounds: 1,018 (1.5 rpg)
- Assists: 1,501 (2.3 apg)
- Stats at NBA.com
- Stats at Basketball Reference

Kevin Jermaine Ollie (born December 27, 1972) is an American basketball coach and former player who most recently was the interim head coach for the Brooklyn Nets of the National Basketball Association (NBA).

He is the former head coach of the University of Connecticut men's basketball team and one of only four African-American coaches to ever win an NCAA men's basketball championship. Ollie graduated from UConn in 1995 with a degree in communications. He played for twelve NBA franchises, most prominently in three stints with the Philadelphia 76ers, in thirteen seasons from 1997 to 2010 after beginning his career with the CBA in 1995.

After retiring from professional basketball in 2010, Ollie joined UConn as an assistant coach; in 2012 he was promoted to head coach following the retirement of Jim Calhoun (who coached Ollie when he was a player). In his second year as Huskies head coach, they won the 2014 NCAA Division I men's basketball tournament. He was fired in 2018.

== Early life ==
Ollie was born in Dallas, Texas to parents Fletcher and Dorothy Ollie and grew up in the rough neighborhood of South Central Los Angeles. When Ollie was seven years old, his parents divorced and his father moved to Dallas. He spent summers there, cutting lawns and doing other odd jobs so he could be with him for some length of time. His mother, a school teacher and ordained minister, raised him and his older sisters, Vita and Rhonda, by herself.

== Playing career ==
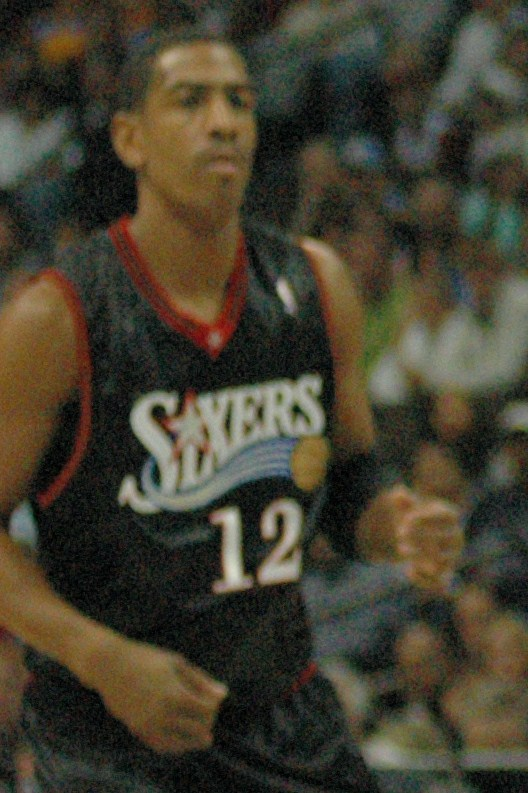
Ollie with the 76ers in 2007

Ollie attended and played basketball at Crenshaw High School in Los Angeles, California. He then starred for four seasons (1991–95) at the University of Connecticut. After his college graduation, he joined the Connecticut Pride of the Continental Basketball Association, playing with them from 1995 to 1997. After that, he began playing in the NBA.

The Minnesota Timberwolves made Ollie their captain during the 2008–09 season. He was then signed by the Oklahoma City Thunder on August 1, 2009, for the veteran's minimum. After the season Ollie retired to join the Connecticut Huskies as an assistant coach.

NBA player Kevin Durant in an interview with Grantland said that Ollie (who played for the Oklahoma City Thunder during the 2009–10 season) "taught him the ropes", and "changed the culture of Oklahoma City". He also said, "Kevin Ollie, he was a game changer for us. I think he changed the whole culture in Oklahoma City. Just his mind set, professionalism, every single day. And we all watched that, and we all wanted to be like that. It rubbed off on Russell Westbrook, myself, Jeff Green, James Harden. And then everybody who comes through now, it's the standard that you've got to live up to as a Thunder player. And it all started with Kevin Ollie."

Ollie had previously played a similar role with the Cleveland Cavaliers. Jim Paxson, Cavaliers GM at the time, recalled his motivation for signing Ollie: "We thought he could come in and be a bridge for us at the point guard position," Paxson recalled, "and also be a good influence on our younger players, the primary one being LeBron James." Paxson cited Ollie's "professionalism and approach to the game" as qualities the team valued.

== Coaching career ==
In 2012, Ollie was named the head basketball coach at Connecticut, replacing longtime hall of fame coach Jim Calhoun. During his college career, Ollie had played under Calhoun. He also served as an assistant coach for Calhoun's final two seasons at UConn. As an assistant coach in 2011, Ollie helped guide the Huskies to a record eleven straight postseason wins which included winning five games in five nights to win the Big East tournament championship and winning the 2011 NCAA men's basketball championship. On December 29, 2012, UConn and Ollie agreed to a five-year deal.

The Huskies ended their first season under Ollie 20–10 overall and 8th in Big East play (10–8). The team was ineligible for postseason play because of an NCAA ban resulting from a low Academic Progress Rate score several seasons prior.

On December 2, 2013, the Huskies defeated Florida, after which they were ranked #9. The Huskies finished 3rd in the AAC, and defeated Memphis and Cincinnati before losing to Louisville in the AAC Championship game. Connecticut earned an at-large bid to the NCAA tournament with a #7 seed, and defeated #10-seeded Saint Joseph's, #2-seeded Villanova, #3-seeded Iowa State, and #4-seeded Michigan State to become the first #7 seed to reach the Final Four since the tournament expanded in 1985.

On April 5, 2014, the Huskies defeated top-ranked Florida in the Final Four national semifinal of the NCAA tournament 63–53. The Huskies then defeated Kentucky 60–54 in the championship game on April 7 for UConn's fourth NCAA men's championship in fifteen years.

On May 22, 2014, Ollie signed a new five-year contract with UConn, worth $2.8 million per year. He was fired with just cause on March 10, 2018, due to an investigation by the NCAA which led to a three-year show-cause order from the NCAA for violations that took place over a four-year period ending in 2017. Ollie was charged with "failure to monitor" his program and not promoting an atmosphere of compliance. Connecticut also lost one scholarship for the 2019–20 class, was put on two years' probation, fined $5,000 and received various minor recruiting restrictions. The team also had to vacate victories in which an ineligible player participated during the 2016–17 and 2017–18 seasons (none were vacated for 2016–17).

Ollie was charged with three Level I violations stemming from the following: summer pick-up games that should have counted toward allowable team activities, a video coordinator engaging in impermissible coaching instruction and a booster providing extra benefits to student-athletes. The extra benefits were provided by a private trainer and included training, lodging, meals and local transportation. Ollie filed a grievance following his firing, seeking to get $10 million in back pay.

Should a school have sought to hire Ollie before his show-cause order expired on July 2, 2022, it would have had to meet before the NCAA committee on infractions to justify the move. Ollie filed a claim under the university's grievance process, alleging disparate treatment due as his predecessor was retained despite committing NCAA violations. UConn then refused to continue with the contractual grievance process when Ollie filed a separate claim through the courts. As of February 2019, Ollie and UConn administration were in arbitration related to his filing of the original grievance. On January 20, 2022, an arbitrator ruled that UConn improperly fired Ollie and ordered the university to pay him back pay.

On April 12, 2021, Overtime Elite announced Ollie's hiring as head of coaching and basketball development.

On June 3, 2023, it was reported that Ollie would be hired as an assistant coach with the Brooklyn Nets of the NBA. Ollie joined the Nets coaching staff under head coach Jacque Vaughn. After Vaughn was fired during the 2024 NBA All-Star break, the Nets promoted Ollie to fill the role of head coach on an interim basis.

== Awards and honors ==
In 2014, ESPN did a series on the Top 50 college hoops coaches—the best NCAA men's basketball coaches right now. Ollie was tenth best on the list. Although he was only in his second year of coaching, he started with a team subject to sanctions, unable to compete in the NCAA tournament, and still managed to complete the season with a 20–10 record, and followed that with a national championship.

== Personal life ==
Ollie is a Christian. During his NBA career, Ollie was actively involved with the Fellowship of Christian Athletes. Ollie's FCA chaplain stated, "There are very few guys in the NBA who are really sold out to the Lord like Kevin."

Ollie and his ex-wife, Stephanie, have two children: son Jalen and daughter Cheyenne. Stephanie Ollie filed for divorce in January 2015.

== NBA career statistics ==
Legend
GP	Games played	GS	Games started	MPG	Minutes per game
FG%	Field goal percentage	3P%	3-point field goal percentage	FT%	Free throw percentage
RPG	Rebounds per game	APG	Assists per game	SPG	Steals per game
BPG	Blocks per game	PPG	Points per game	**Bold**	Career high

=== Regular season ===
Year	Team	GP	GS	MPG	FG%	3P%	FT%	RPG	APG	SPG	BPG	PPG
1997–98	Dallas	16	0	13.4	.333	—	.720	1.3	2.0	.4	.0	2.9
1997–98	Orlando	19	0	11.4	.411	.000	.689	.9	1.7	.4	.0	4.1
1998–99	Sacramento	7	0	9.7	.308	—	.800	.9	.4	.4	**.1**	1.7
1998–99	Orlando	1	0	4.0	.000	—	.500	1.0	.0	.0	.0	1.0
1999–00	Philadelphia	40	0	7.3	.449	—	.757	.8	1.2	.3	.0	1.8
2000–01	New Jersey	19	0	8.5	.185	—	.632	1.2	1.3	.3	.0	1.2
2000–01	Philadelphia	51	4	15.0	.430	.333	.729	1.4	2.4	.5	.0	3.8
2001–02	Chicago	52	17	22.0	.383	.500	.838	2.5	3.7	.7	.0	5.8
2001–02	Indiana	29	0	19.9	.400	—	.804	1.9	3.4	.9	.0	5.4
2002–03	Milwaukee	53	4	21.3	**.459**	.200	.747	1.9	3.4	.7	**.1**	5.7
2002–03	Seattle	29	1	**26.6**	.441	**1.000**	.759	**2.9**	**3.8**	**1.1**	.0	**8.0**
2003–04	Cleveland	**82**	7	17.1	.370	.444	.835	2.1	2.9	.6	**.1**	4.2
2004–05	Philadelphia	26	0	6.1	.355	—	.667	.7	.7	.2	.0	1.1
2005–06	Philadelphia	70	**23**	15.3	.431	.333	.837	1.4	1.4	.5	.0	2.7
2006–07	Philadelphia	53	**23**	17.3	.433	.100	.822	1.4	2.5	.4	.0	3.8
2007–08	Philadelphia	40	0	7.5	.420	.000	.800	.5	1.0	.3	.0	1.8
2008–09	Minnesota	50	21	17.0	.407	.000	.833	1.5	2.3	.4	**.1**	4.0
2009–10	Oklahoma City	25	0	10.5	.400	.000	**1.000**	1.0	0.8	.4	.0	1.8
Career		662	100	15.6	.410	.310	.792	1.5	2.3	.5	.0	3.8

=== Playoffs ===
Year	Team	GP	GS	MPG	FG%	3P%	FT%	RPG	APG	SPG	BPG	PPG
2000	Philadelphia	10	0	6.5	**.500**	.000	.889	.5	1.2	.2	.0	2.0
2001	Philadelphia	**23**	0	5.3	.370	.000	.929	.4	1.0	.0	.0	1.4
2002	Indiana	5	0	**23.6**	.423	**.500**	**1.000**	**2.4**	**4.6**	.6	.0	**5.8**
2008	Philadelphia	3	0	6.3	.250	.000	**1.000**	.3	1.0	**.7**	.0	1.3
2010	Oklahoma City	1	0	5.0	.000	.000	.000	.0	.0	.0	.0	.0
Career		42	0	7.9	.406	.500	.935	.7	1.5	.2	.0	2.1

== Head coaching record ==
=== College ===
Ollie's victories from the 2016–17 and 2017–18 seasons have been vacated.

Record table
Season	Team	Overall	Conference	Standing	Postseason
Connecticut Huskies (Big East Conference) (2012–2013)
2012–13	Connecticut	20–10	10–8	T–7th	Ineligible
UConn Huskies (American Athletic Conference) (2013–2018)
2013–14	UConn	32–8	12–6	T–3rd	NCAA Division I champion
2014–15	UConn	20–15	10–8	T–5th	NIT first round
2015–16	UConn	25–11	11–7	6th	NCAA Division I Round of 32
2016–17	UConn	16–17	9–9	Vacated	
2017–18	UConn	0–18	0–11	Vacated	
Connecticut/UConn:		97–79 (.551)	43–49 (.467)		
Total:		97–79 (.551)			
National champion Postseason invitational champion Conference regular season champion Conference regular season and conference tournament champion Division regular season champion Division regular season and conference tournament champion Conference tournament champion

=== NBA ===
Legend
Regular season	G	Games coached	W	Games won	L	Games lost	W–L %	Win–loss %
Playoffs	PG	Playoff games	PW	Playoff wins	PL	Playoff losses	PW–L %	Playoff win–loss %

Team	Year	G	W	L	W–L%	Finish	PG	PW	PL	PW–L%	Result
Brooklyn	2023–24	28	11	17	.393	4th in Atlantic	—	—	—	—	Missed playoffs
Career		28	11	17	.393		—	—	—	—	

== See also ==
- List of NCAA Division I men's basketball tournament Final Four appearances by coach
