= 2009–10 Oklahoma City Thunder season =

NBA professional basketball team season

- Head coach: Scott Brooks
- General manager: Sam Presti
- Owners: Professional Basketball Club LLC
- Arena: Ford Center

Results
- Record: 50–32 (.610)
- Place: Division: 4th (Northwest); Conference: 8th (Western)
- Playoff finish: First Round (lost to Lakers 2–4)
- Stats at Basketball Reference

Local media
- Television: KSBI; Fox Sports Oklahoma
- Radio: WWLS-AM; FM

The 2009–10 Oklahoma City Thunder season was the 2nd season of the franchise's existence in Oklahoma City as a member of the National Basketball Association (NBA).

With NBA scoring champion Kevin Durant, second-year point guard Russell Westbrook, and forward Jeff Green leading the way, the Thunder made the playoffs as the youngest team in the NBA with the 28th highest total salary in the league. The team became the youngest NBA playoff team (23.19, using data going back to 1952) based on average age weighted by minutes played. The Thunder were then eliminated by the defending and eventual NBA champions, the Los Angeles Lakers in six games in the First Round. The 2009–10 Oklahoma City Thunder and the 2007–08 Denver Nuggets are tied at 50–32 for having the best 8th seed record in NBA history. This was also the first season for James Harden. The Thunder clinched their first playoff spot since 2005, and their first in Oklahoma City.

From a business perspective, the team began to show positive financial performance after years of losses in Seattle and a transition-cost laden 2008–09 season. In December 2009, Forbes magazine estimated the team's operating profit at $12.7 million, and estimated the overall franchise value at $310 million, good for 20th in the NBA.

== Key dates ==
- June 25, 2009: The 2009 NBA draft took place in New York City.
- July 8, 2009: The free agency period started.
- October 28, 2009: The Thunder play their first regular-season game, and achieve their first regular-season victory, in a 102–89 home win over the Sacramento Kings.
- January 2, 2010 Kevin Durant scored more than 30 points in his seventh consecutive game, breaking the franchise record set by Spencer Haywood in January 1972.
- January 20, 2010: The Thunder surpass their win total from 2008 to 2009 with their 24th season victory, a 94–92 win at the Minnesota Timberwolves.
- February 24, 2010: Kevin Durant's 21 points in a loss to the San Antonio Spurs ends his streak of 29 consecutive games with 25 or more points.
- March 2, 2010: The Thunder surpass the 500,000 season home attendance figure in a 113–107 victory over the Sacramento Kings at the Ford Center.
- March 12, 2010: Durant had his 36th game with 30 or more points this season, breaking the franchise record set by Spencer Haywood in the 1972–73 season. Durant ended the regular season with 41 games of 30 points or more.
- April 3, 2010: The Thunder clinch a playoff spot for the first time in city franchise history with a 121–116 victory over the Dallas Mavericks.
- April 14, 2010: Durant becomes the youngest scoring leader at the age of 21, taking the distinction from Max Zaslofsky (1947–48 BAA scoring leader at the age of 22). The Thunder also end the season on a positive note, beating the Memphis Grizzlies 114-105 – their 27th season home sellout, bringing total home attendance to 738,149 (an average of 18,003 per game, 12th in the NBA).
- April 22, 2010: The Thunder win their first-ever Oklahoma City franchise playoff game with a 101–96 victory over the Los Angeles Lakers at the Ford Center.

== Draft picks ==
Round	Pick	Player	Position	Nationality	College/club team
1	3	James Harden	SG	United States	Arizona State
1	25	Rodrigue Beaubois	PG	France	Cholet (France)

The franchise entered the draft for the first time as the Thunder with two first-round picks: their own (3rd) and an additional selection from the San Antonio Spurs (25th) acquired in 2008 as the Seattle SuperSonics. The team had previously traded its original second-round pick to the Denver Nuggets in January 2009.

== Roster ==
2009–10 Oklahoma City Thunder roster
Players

Pos.	No.	Player	Height	Weight	DOB	From
C	4	Nick Collison	6 ft 10 in (2.08 m)	255 lb (116 kg)	1980-10-26	Kansas
SF	35	Kevin Durant	6 ft 9 in (2.06 m)	215 lb (98 kg)	1988-09-29	Texas
PF	22	Jeff Green	6 ft 9 in (2.06 m)	235 lb (107 kg)	1986-08-28	Georgetown
SG	13	James Harden	6 ft 5 in (1.96 m)	220 lb (100 kg)	1989-08-26	Arizona State
PF	9	Serge Ibaka	6 ft 10 in (2.08 m)	235 lb (107 kg)	1989-09-18	Republic of the Congo
C	12	Nenad Krstić	7 ft 0 in (2.13 m)	240 lb (109 kg)	1983-07-25	Serbia
PG	6	Eric Maynor	6 ft 3 in (1.91 m)	175 lb (79 kg)	1987-06-11	VCU
PF	23	Byron Mullens	7 ft 0 in (2.13 m)	275 lb (125 kg)	1989-02-14	Ohio State
PG	7	Kevin Ollie	6 ft 2 in (1.88 m)	195 lb (88 kg)	1972-12-27	Connecticut
SG	2	Thabo Sefolosha	6 ft 7 in (2.01 m)	215 lb (98 kg)	1984-05-02	Switzerland
SG	11	Mustafa Shakur	6 ft 3 in (1.91 m)	190 lb (86 kg)	1984-08-18	Arizona
C	36	Etan Thomas	6 ft 10 in (2.08 m)	260 lb (118 kg)	1978-04-01	Syracuse
SG	5	Kyle Weaver	6 ft 5 in (1.96 m)	201 lb (91 kg)	1986-02-18	Washington State
PG	0	Russell Westbrook	6 ft 3 in (1.91 m)	187 lb (85 kg)	1988-11-12	UCLA
PF	3	D. J. White	6 ft 9 in (2.06 m)	251 lb (114 kg)	1986-08-31	Indiana

Coaches
Head coach
- Scott Brooks
Assistant(s)
- Mark Bryant
- Maurice Cheeks
- Rex Kalamian
- Brian Keefe

Legend
- (DP) Unsigned draft pick
- (FA) Free agent
- (S) Suspended
- (DL) On assignment to D-League affiliate
- Injured

Roster
Updated: April 17, 2010

=== Salaries ===
Player	Salary
Etan Thomas	$7,350,000
Earl Watson	$6,600,000
Matt Harpring	$6,500,000
Nick Collison	$6,250,000
Nenad Krstić	$5,400,000
Kevin Durant	$4,796,880
James Harden	$4,004,160
Russell Westbrook	$3,755,640
Jeff Green	$3,516,960
Thabo Sefolosha	$2,759,627
Eric Maynor	$1,318,920
Kevin Ollie	$1,306,455
Byron Mullens	$1,120,200
Serge Ibaka	$1,120,200
DJ White	$1,036,440
Kyle Weaver	$870,968
Shaun Livingston	$296,695
Ryan Bowen	$209,592
Mike Wilks	$175,908

Source: HoopsHype

== Game log ==
=== Preseason ===
2009 preseason game log
Total: 2–5 (Home: 1–1; Road: 0–3; Neutral 1–1)
Preseason: 1–4 (home: 1–1; road: 0–3)

Game	Date	Team	Score	High points	High rebounds	High assists	Location Attendance	Record
1	October 7	at Memphis	L 91–99				FedExForum; 7,217	0–1
2	October 10	at New Orleans	L 79–88				New Orleans Arena; 11,568	0–2
3	October 12	Phoenix	W 110–105 (OT)				Ford Center; 15,223	1–2
4	October 14	vs. Miami	W 96–91				BOK Center (Tulsa, OK); 10,427	2–2
5	October 19	at Houston	L 85–105				Toyota Center; 11,992	2–3
6	October 20	vs. San Antonio	L 102–119				Frank Erwin Center (Austin, TX); 10,290	2–4
7	October 22	Sacramento	L 89–104				Ford Center; 16,014	2–5

2009–10 preseason schedule

== Regular season ==
=== Standings ===
==== Division ====
Northwest Division	W	L	PCT	GB	Home	Road	Div
y-Denver Nuggets	53	29	.646	–	34–7	19–22	12–4
x-Utah Jazz	53	29	.646	–	32–9	21–20	8–8
x-Portland Trail Blazers	50	32	.610	3	26–15	24–17	8–8
x-Oklahoma City Thunder	50	32	.610	3	27–14	23–18	9–7
Minnesota Timberwolves	15	67	.183	38	10–31	5–36	3–13

==== Conference ====
#	Western Conference				
#	Team	W	L	PCT	GB
1	c-Los Angeles Lakers	57	25	.695	–
2	y-Dallas Mavericks	55	27	.671	2
3	x-Phoenix Suns	54	28	.659	3
4	y-Denver Nuggets	53	29	.646	4
5	x-Utah Jazz	53	29	.646	4
6	x-Portland Trail Blazers	50	32	.610	7
7	x-San Antonio Spurs	50	32	.610	7
8	x-Oklahoma City Thunder	50	32	.610	7
9	Houston Rockets	42	40	.512	15
10	Memphis Grizzlies	40	42	.488	17
11	New Orleans Hornets	37	45	.451	20
12	Los Angeles Clippers	29	53	.354	28
13	Golden State Warriors	26	56	.317	31
14	Sacramento Kings	25	57	.305	32
15	Minnesota Timberwolves	15	67	.183	42

=== Game log ===
2009–10 game log
October: 2–0 (home: 1–0; road: 1–0)

Game	Date	Team	Score	High points	High rebounds	High assists	Location Attendance	Record
1	October 28	Sacramento	W 102–89	Kevin Durant (25)	Kevin Durant (11)	Russell Westbrook (13)	Ford Center; 18,203	1–0
2	October 30	@ Detroit	W 91–83	Kevin Durant (25)	Kevin Durant (12)	Russell Westbrook (10)	The Palace of Auburn Hills; 22,076	2–0

November: 7–8 (home: 3–4; road: 4–4)

Game	Date	Team	Score	High points	High rebounds	High assists	Location Attendance	Record
3	November 1	Portland	L 74–83	Russell Westbrook (23)	Jeff Green (11)	Russell Westbrook, James Harden (2)	Ford Center; 16,920	2–1
4	November 3	L.A. Lakers	L 98–101	Kevin Durant (28)	Etan Thomas (11)	Russell Westbrook (7)	Ford Center; 18,203	2–2
5	November 6	@ Houston	L 94–105	Russell Westbrook (33)	Kevin Durant (9)	Russell Westbrook (7)	Toyota Center; 14,911	2–3
6	November 8	Orlando	W 102–74	Kevin Durant (28)	Thabo Sefolosha (10)	Russell Westbrook (10)	Ford Center; 18,203	3–3
7	November 10	@ Sacramento	L 98–101	Kevin Durant (37)	Nenad Krstić (8)	Russell Westbrook, Thabo Sefolosha (6)	ARCO Arena; 10,523	3–4
8	November 11	@ L.A. Clippers	W 83–79	Kevin Durant (30)	Kevin Durant (10)	James Harden (8)	Staples Center; 14,248	4–4
9	November 14	@ San Antonio	W 101–98	Kevin Durant (25)	Jeff Green (10)	Russell Westbrook (11)	AT&T Center; 17,947	5–4
10	November 15	L.A. Clippers	L 93–101	Kevin Durant (40)	Russell Westbrook (9)	Russell Westbrook (7)	Ford Center; 17,715	5–5
11	November 17	@ Miami	W 100–87	Kevin Durant (32)	Kevin Durant, Thabo Sefolosha (9)	Russell Westbrook (7)	American Airlines Arena; 14,443	6–5
12	November 18	@ Orlando	L 94–108	James Harden (24)	Serge Ibaka (9)	Kyle Weaver, Kevin Ollie (4)	Amway Arena; 17,461	6–6
13	November 20	Washington	W 127–108	Kevin Durant (35)	Jeff Green (14)	Russell Westbrook (7)	Ford Center; 18,203	7–6
14	November 22	@ L.A. Lakers	L 85–101	Kevin Durant (19)	Serge Ibaka (13)	Russell Westbrook (7)	Staples Center; 18,997	7–7
15	November 24	@ Utah	W 104–94	Kevin Durant (28)	Jeff Green, Nenad Krstić (6)	Kevin Durant (8)	EnergySolutions Arena; 17,937	8–7
16	November 27	Milwaukee	W 108–90	Kevin Durant (33)	Kevin Durant (12)	Russell Westbrook (7)	Ford Center; 18,203	9–7
17	November 29	Houston	L 91–100	Kevin Durant (25)	Kevin Durant (9)	Kevin Durant (6)	Ford Center; 18,203	9–8

December: 9–6 (home: 5–3; road: 4–3)

Game	Date	Team	Score	High points	High rebounds	High assists	Location Attendance	Record
18	December 2	Philadelphia	W 117–106	Kevin Durant (33)	Nick Collison (7)	Russell Westbrook (15)	Ford Center; 17,332	10–8
19	December 4	Boston	L 87–105	Kevin Durant (36)	Kevin Durant (5)	Russell Westbrook (4)	Ford Center; 18,203	10–9
20	December 7	Golden State	W 104–88	Kevin Durant (28)	Jeff Green (13)	James Harden (5)	Ford Center; 17,334	11–9
21	December 11	@ Memphis	W 102–94	Kevin Durant (32)	Kevin Durant (10)	Russell Westbrook (7)	FedExForum; 13,048	12–9
22	December 13	Cleveland	L 89–102	Kevin Durant (29)	Nenad Krstić (8)	Russell Westbrook (5)	Ford Center; 18,203	12–10
23	December 14	@ Denver	L 93–102	Kevin Durant (32)	Kevin Durant (10)	Russell Westbrook (6)	Pepsi Center; 16,022	12–11
24	December 16	Dallas	L 86–100	Russell Westbrook (16)	Jeff Green (11)	Russell Westbrook (5)	Ford Center; 18,203	12–12
25	December 18	Detroit	W 109–98	Kevin Durant (27)	Nenad Krstić (8)	James Harden (8)	Ford Center; 17,774	13–12
26	December 19	@ Houston	L 90–95	Jeff Green (21)	Jeff Green, Thabo Sefolosha, Serge Ibaka (8)	Russell Westbrook (7)	Toyota Center; 15,095	13–13
27	December 22	@ L.A. Lakers	L 108–111	Kevin Durant (30)	Jeff Green, Russell Westbrook (7)	Russell Westbrook (13)	Staples Center; 18,997	13–14
28	December 23	@ Phoenix	W 117–113	Kevin Durant (38)	Jeff Green (9)	Russell Westbrook (7)	US Airways Center; 15,953	14–14
29	December 26	Charlotte	W 98–91	Kevin Durant (30)	Nenad Krstić (10)	Russell Westbrook (6)	Ford Center; 17,961	15–14
30	December 28	@ New Jersey	W 105–89	Kevin Durant (40)	Nick Collison (10)	Russell Westbrook (10)	Izod Center; 15,335	16–14
31	December 29	@ Washington	W 110–98	Kevin Durant (35)	Kevin Durant (11)	Russell Westbrook (10)	Verizon Center; 17,152	17–14
32	December 31	Utah	W 87–86	Kevin Durant (31)	Kevin Durant (8)	Russell Westbrook (10)	Ford Center; 18,203	18–14

January: 8–7 (home: 5–3; road: 3–4)

Game	Date	Team	Score	High points	High rebounds	High assists	Location Attendance	Record
33	January 2	@ Milwaukee	L 97–103	Kevin Durant (31)	Thabo Sefolosha, Russell Westbrook (9)	Russell Westbrook (13)	Bradley Center; 15,264	18–15
34	January 4	@ Chicago	W 98–85	Russell Westbrook (29)	Thabo Sefolosha (9)	Russell Westbrook (6)	United Center; 18,838	19–15
35	January 6	New Orleans	L 92–97	Kevin Durant (27)	Thabo Sefolosha, Nick Collison (7)	Russell Westbrook (9)	Ford Center; 17,836	19–16
36	January 9	Indiana	W 108–102	Kevin Durant (40)	Kevin Durant (12)	Russell Westbrook (6)	Ford Center; 18,203	20–16
37	January 11	New York	W 106–88	Kevin Durant (30)	Nenad Krstić, Thabo Sefolosha (8)	Russell Westbrook (5)	Ford Center; 17,152	21–16
38	January 13	San Antonio	L 108–109	Kevin Durant (35)	Jeff Green (10)	Russell Westbrook (13)	Ford Center; 17,886	21–17
39	January 15	@ Dallas	L 98–99	Kevin Durant (30)	Kevin Durant (13)	Russell Westbrook (6)	American Airlines Center; 20,064	21–18
40	January 16	Miami	W 98–80	Kevin Durant (36)	Kevin Durant, Serge Ibaka (10)	Russell Westbrook (11)	Ford Center; 18,203	22–18
41	January 18	@ Atlanta	W 94–91	Kevin Durant (29)	Jeff Green (11)	Russell Westbrook (9)	Philips Arena; 14,666	23–18
42	January 20	@ Minnesota	W 94–92	Kevin Durant (31)	Kevin Durant (10)	Russell Westbrook (9)	Target Center; 12,995	24–18
43	January 22	@ Memphis	L 84–86	Kevin Durant (30)	Kevin Durant, Jeff Green (8)	Eric Maynor (6)	FedEx Forum; 12,948	24–19
44	January 23	@ Cleveland	L 99–100	Kevin Durant (34)	Kevin Durant (10)	Russell Westbrook (5)	Quicken Loans Arena; 20,562	24–20
45	January 27	Chicago	L 86–96	Kevin Durant (28)	Kevin Durant (11)	Russell Westbrook (7)	Ford Center; 17,562	24–21
46	January 29	Denver	W 101–84	Kevin Durant (30)	Serge Ibaka (8)	Russell Westbrook (8)	Ford Center; 18,203	25–21
47	January 31	Golden State	W 112–104	Kevin Durant (45)	Kevin Durant (11)	Russell Westbrook (8)	Ford Center; 17,565	26–21

February: 9–2 (home: 4–1; road: 5–1)

Game	Date	Team	Score	High points	High rebounds	High assists	Location Attendance	Record
48	February 2	Atlanta	W 106–99	Kevin Durant (33)	Kevin Durant (11)	Russell Westbrook (9)	Ford Center; 17,360	27–21
49	February 3	@ New Orleans	W 103–99	Kevin Durant (30)	Nick Collison (10)	Russell Westbrook (10)	New Orleans Arena; 12,884	28–21
50	February 6	@ Golden State	W 104–95	Kevin Durant (29)	Nick Collison (10)	Russell Westbrook (10)	Oracle Arena; 17,825	29–21
51	February 9	@ Portland	W 89–77	Kevin Durant (33)	Kevin Durant (11)	Russell Westbrook (7)	Rose Garden Arena; 20,460	30–21
52	February 16	Dallas	W 99–86	Kevin Durant (25)	Kevin Durant (14)	Russell Westbrook (8)	Ford Center; 18,203	31–21
53	February 20	@ New York	W 121–118	Kevin Durant (36)	Jeff Green (11)	Russell Westbrook (10)	Madison Square Garden; 19,763	32–21
54	February 21	@ Minnesota	W 109–107	Kevin Durant (32)	Jeff Green (14)	Russell Westbrook (14)	Target Center; 14,202	33–21
55	February 23	Phoenix	L 102–104	Kevin Durant (36)	Kevin Durant (8)	Russell Westbrook (10)	Ford Center; 18,203	33–22
56	February 24	@ San Antonio	L 87–95	Kevin Durant (21)	Thabo Sefolosha (13)	Russell Westbrook (7)	AT&T Center; 18,400	33–23
57	February 26	Minnesota	W 109–92	Kevin Durant (25)	Kevin Durant (9)	Russell Westbrook (15)	Ford Center; 18,203	34–23
58	February 28	Toronto	W 119–99	Kevin Durant (29)	Serge Ibaka (10)	Russell Westbrook (10)	Ford Center; 18,203	35–23

March: 11–5 (home: 6–2; road: 5–3)

Game	Date	Team	Score	High points	High rebounds	High assists	Location Attendance	Record
59	March 2	Sacramento	W 113–107	Kevin Durant (39)	Kevin Durant (10)	Russell Westbrook (13)	Ford Center; 17,677	36–23
60	March 3	@ Denver	L 90–119	Kevin Durant, James Harden (19)	Serge Ibaka (13)	Russell Westbrook (6)	Pepsi Center; 18,822	36–24
61	March 5	@ L.A. Clippers	W 104–87	Kevin Durant (32)	Nenad Kristic (11)	Russell Westbrook (9)	Staples Center; 18,497	37–24
62	March 7	@ Sacramento	W 108–102	Kevin Durant (27)	Nenad Krstić (10)	Kevin Durant (5)	ARCO Arena; 12,081	38–24
63	March 10	New Orleans	W 98–83	Kevin Durant (29)	Jeff Green, Serge Ibaka (9)	Russell Westbrook (9)	Ford Center; 18,203	39–24
64	March 12	New Jersey	W 104–102	Kevin Durant (32)	Kevin Durant (12)	Russell Westbrook (10)	Ford Center; 18,203	40–24
65	March 14	Utah	W 119–111	Kevin Durant (35)	Serge Ibaka, Thabo Sefolosha (6)	Russell Westbrook (11)	Ford Center; 18,203	41–24
66	March 17	@ Charlotte	L 92–100	Kevin Durant (26)	Kevin Durant (10)	Russell Westbrook (10)	Time Warner Cable Arena; 16,179	41–25
67	March 19	@ Toronto	W 115–89	Kevin Durant (31)	Nenad Krstić, Nick Collison (8)	Russell Westbrook (10)	Air Canada Centre; 19,351	42–25
68	March 21	@ Indiana	L 101–121	Jeff Green (20)	Serge Ibaka (12)	Eric Maynor (11)	Conseco Fieldhouse; 14,701	42–26
69	March 22	San Antonio	L 96–99	Kevin Durant (45)	Kevin Durant, Serge Ibaka (8)	Eric Maynor (5)	Ford Center; 18,203	42–27
70	March 24	Houston	W 122–104	Kevin Durant (25)	Nick Collison (9)	Eric Maynor (9)	Ford Center; 18,203	43–27
71	March 26	L.A. Lakers	W 91–75	Kevin Durant (26)	Nenad Krstić (10)	Russell Westbrook (6)	Ford Center; 18,203	44–27
72	March 28	Portland	L 87–92	Kevin Durant (29)	Kevin Durant (13)	Russell Westbrook (6)	Ford Center; 18,203	44–28
73	March 30	@ Philadelphia	W 111–93	Kevin Durant (26)	Kevin Durant (10)	Russell Westbrook (14)	Wachovia Center; 14,809	45–28
74	March 31	@ Boston	W 109–104	Kevin Durant (37)	Kevin Durant, Nenad Krstić (8)	Russell Westbrook (10)	TD Garden; 18,624	46–28

April: 4–4 (home: 3–1; road: 1–3)

Game	Date	Team	Score	High points	High rebounds	High assists	Location Attendance	Record
75	April 3	@ Dallas	W 121–116	Kevin Durant (23)	Nenad Krstić (6)	Russell Westbrook (6)	American Airlines Center; 20,329	47–28
76	April 4	Minnesota	W 116–108	Kevin Durant (40)	Jeff Green (10)	Russell Westbrook (16)	Ford Center; 18,203	48–28
77	April 6	@ Utah	L 139–140	Kevin Durant (45)	Kevin Durant, Jeff Green (7)	Russell Westbrook (9)	EnergySolutions Arena; 19,911	48–29
78	April 7	Denver	L 94–98	Kevin Durant (33)	Kevin Durant (11)	Jeff Green (5)	Ford Center; 18,332	48–30
79	April 9	Phoenix	W 96–91	Kevin Durant (35)	Kevin Durant, Serge Ibaka (9)	Russell Westbrook (10)	Ford Center; 18,334	49–30
80	April 11	@ Golden State	L 117–120	Kevin Durant (40)	Nick Collison, Serge Ibaka (12)	Russell Westbrook (9)	Oracle Arena; 18,940	49–31
81	April 12	@ Portland	L 95–103	Kevin Durant (30)	Thabo Sefolosha (8)	Eric Maynor (5)	Rose Garden Arena; 20,691	49–32
82	April 14	Memphis	W 114–105	Kevin Durant (31)	Serge Ibaka (9)	Eric Maynor (10)	Ford Center; 18,334	50–32

2009–10 season schedule

== Playoffs ==
=== Game log ===
2010 playoff game log
First Round: 2–4 (home: 2–1; road: 0–3)

Game	Date	Team	Score	High points	High rebounds	High assists	Location Attendance	Series
1	April 18	@ L.A. Lakers	L 79–87	Kevin Durant (24)	Nick Collison (8)	Russell Westbrook (8)	Staples Center; 18,997	0–1
2	April 20	@ L.A. Lakers	L 92–95	Kevin Durant (33)	Kevin Durant (8)	Thabo Sefolosha, Russell Westbrook (3)	Staples Center; 18,997	0–2
3	April 22	L.A. Lakers	W 101–96	Kevin Durant (29)	Kevin Durant (19)	Kevin Durant, Russell Westbrook (4)	Ford Center; 18,342	1–2
4	April 24	L.A. Lakers	W 110–89	Kevin Durant (22)	Jeff Green (9)	Russell Westbrook (6)	Ford Center; 18,342	2–2
5	April 27	@ L.A. Lakers	L 87–111	Kevin Durant (17)	Serge Ibaka (9)	Russell Westbrook (6)	Staples Center; 18,997	2–3
6	April 30	L.A. Lakers	L 94–95	Kevin Durant (26)	Nenad Krstić (11)	Russell Westbrook (9)	Ford Center; 18,342	2–4

2010 playoff schedule

== Player statistics ==
Legend
GP	Games played	GS	Games started	MPG	Minutes per game
FG%	Field-goal percentage	3P%	3-point field-goal percentage	FT%	Free-throw percentage
RPG	Rebounds per game	APG	Assists per game	SPG	Steals per game
BPG	Blocks per game	PPG	Points per game

=== Season ===
Player	GP	GS	MPG	FG%	3P%	FT%	RPG	APG	SPG	BPG	PPG
Antonio Anderson	1	0	15.0	.333	.000	.000	1.0	.0	.0	.0	1.0
Ryan Bowen	1	0	8.0	1.000	.000	1.000	2.0	.0	1.0	.0	4.0
Nick Collison	75	5	20.8	.589	.250	.692	5.1	.5	.5	.6	5.9
Kevin Durant	82	82	39.5	.476	.365	.900	7.6	2.8	1.4	1.0	30.1
Jeff Green	82	82	37.1	.453	.333	.740	6.0	1.6	1.3	.9	15.1
James Harden	76	0	22.9	.403	.375	.808	3.2	1.8	1.0	.2	9.9
Serge Ibaka	73	0	18.1	.543	.500	.630	5.4	.1	.3	1.3	6.3
Nenad Krstić	76	76	22.9	.502	.200	.717	5.0	.7	.4	.6	8.4
Shaun Livingston	10	0	13.0	.313	.000	.000	2.0	1.4	.5	.2	1.0
Eric Maynor^{1}	55	0	16.5	.434	.362	.692	1.7	3.4	.5	.2	4.5
Byron Mullens	13	0	4.2	.368	.000	.000	.8	.1	.2	.0	1.1
Kevin Ollie	25	0	10.5	.400	.000	1.000	1.0	.8	.4	.0	1.8
Thabo Sefolosha	82	82	28.6	.440	.313	.674	4.7	1.8	1.2	.6	6.0
Etan Thomas	23	1	14.0	.456	.000	.591	2.8	.0	.2	.7	3.3
Kyle Weaver	12	0	12.0	.364	.368	.833	1.5	.9	.5	.5	3.0
Russell Westbrook	82	82	34.3	.418	.221	.780	4.9	8.0	1.3	.4	16.1
D. J. White	12	0	8.5	.610	.000	.900	1.9	.3	.4	.2	4.9
Mike Wilks	4	0	14.8	.500	.667	.500	1.0	1.0	.0	.0	4.0

^{1}Stats with the Thunder.

=== Playoffs ===
Player	GP	GS	MPG	FG%	3P%	FT%	RPG	APG	SPG	BPG	PPG
Nick Collison	6	0	21.5	.333	.000	.429	4.7	.3	.8	.2	3.2
Kevin Durant	6	6	38.5	.350	.286	.871	7.7	2.3	.5	1.3	25.0
Jeff Green	6	6	37.3	.329	.296	.850	4.7	1.7	.7	.5	11.8
James Harden	6	0	20.0	.387	.375	.842	2.5	1.8	1.0	.2	7.7
Serge Ibaka	6	0	25.5	.571	.000	.700	6.5	.3	.3	2.0	7.8
Nenad Krstić	6	6	21.5	.405	.000	.929	5.8	.7	.5	.7	7.2
Eric Maynor	6	0	12.7	.300	.167	.818	1.5	1.5	.2	.2	3.7
Byron Mullens	1	0	4.0	.000	.000	.500	.0	.0	.0	.0	1.0
Kevin Ollie	1	0	5.0	.000	.000	.000	.0	.0	.0	.0	.0
Thabo Sefolosha	6	6	21.2	.296	.231	.889	3.0	1.2	.8	1.0	4.5
Etan Thomas	2	0	8.5	.833	.000	1.000	2.0	0.0	0.0	0.0	6.0
Kyle Weaver	1	0	12.0	.250	.000	.000	2.0	2.0	.0	.0	2.0
Russell Westbrook	6	6	35.3	.473	.417	.842	6.0	6.0	1.7	.2	20.5
D. J. White	0	0	0	.000	.000	.000	.0	.0	.0	.0	.0

==== 2010 NBA Western Conference First Round vs. L.A. Lakers ====
2010 Western Conference First Round
Oklahoma City lost 2–4 in the 2010 NBA Western Conference First Round

April 18, 2010

Recap

Oklahoma City Thunder 79, Los Angeles Lakers 87

Staples Center, Los Angeles, California

April 20, 2010

Recap

Oklahoma City Thunder 92, Los Angeles Lakers 95

Staples Center, Los Angeles, California

April 22, 2010

Recap

Los Angeles Lakers 96, Oklahoma City Thunder 101

Ford Center, Oklahoma City, Oklahoma

April 24, 2010

Recap

Los Angeles Lakers 89, Oklahoma City Thunder 110

Ford Center, Oklahoma City, Oklahoma

April 27, 2010

Recap

Oklahoma City Thunder 87, Los Angeles Lakers 111

Staples Center, Los Angeles, California

April 30, 2010

Recap

Los Angeles Lakers 95, Oklahoma City Thunder 94

Ford Center, Oklahoma City, Oklahoma

Team	Games played	Minutes played	Field goals	3–point field goals	Free throws	Rebounds	Assists	Steals	Blocks	Points
Thunder	6	288	184	33	162	260	97	39	37	563
Lakers	6	288	216	45	96	260	125	37	37	573

== Awards and honors ==
=== Weekly ===
- Kevin Durant was named Western Conference Player of the Week for December 28–January 3.
- Kevin Durant was named Western Conference Player of the Week for January 25–31.
- Russell Westbrook was named Western Conference Player of the Week for February 1–7.
- Kevin Durant was named Western Conference Player of the Week for March 29–April 4.

=== Monthly ===
- Scott Brooks was named Western Conference Coach of the Month for February 2010.
- Kevin Durant was named Western Conference Player of the Month for April 2010.

=== All-Star ===
- Kevin Durant was selected as an All-Star for the first time in his career, representing the Western Conference.
- Rookie James Harden was named to the Rookie Team roster in the T-Mobile Rookie Challenge.
- Second-year player Russell Westbrook was named to the Sophomore Team roster in the T-Mobile Rookie Challenge.
- Kevin Durant defended his title as H-O-R-S-E competition champion.
- Russell Westbrook was selected to replace the injured Derrick Rose in the 2010 Taco Bell Skills Challenge.

=== Season ===
- Scott Brooks was named NBA Coach of the Year.
- Kevin Durant won the NBA scoring title.
- James Harden was named to the NBA All-Rookie Second Team.
- Thabo Sefolosha was named to the NBA All-Defensive Second Team.
- Kevin Durant was named to the All-NBA First Team.

== Transactions ==
=== Overview ===
Players Added

Via draft

- James Harden

Via trade

- Byron Mullens
  (Draft rights)
- Etan Thomas

Via free agency

- Ryan Bowen
- Serge Ibaka
  (Draft rights)
- Kevin Ollie
Players Lost

Via trade

- Chucky Atkins
- Damien Wilkins

Via free agency

- Desmond Mason
- Malik Rose
- Robert Swift

Waived

- Earl Watson

=== Trades ===
June 25, 2009	To Oklahoma City Thunder Draft rights to Byron Mullens	To Dallas Mavericks Draft rights to Rodrigue Beaubois; 2010 second-round pick
June 25, 2009	To Oklahoma City Thunder Draft rights to Robert Vaden	To Charlotte Bobcats Cash considerations
July 27, 2009	To Oklahoma City Thunder Etan Thomas; Two 2010 second-round picks	To Minnesota Timberwolves Chucky Atkins; Damien Wilkins
December 22, 2009	To Oklahoma City Thunder Matt Harpring; Eric Maynor	To Utah Jazz Draft rights to Peter Fehse

=== Free agency ===
==== Re-signed ====
Date	Player	Contract
October 28, 2009	Thabo Sefolosha	Multi-Year Extension

==== Additions ====
Date	Player	Contract	Former team
July 11, 2009	Serge Ibaka	Standard	(Spain) Manresa
August 1, 2009	Kevin Ollie	Standard	Minnesota Timberwolves
September 28, 2009	Ryan Bowen	Standard	New Orleans Hornets
November 26, 2009	Mike Wilks	Standard	Seattle SuperSonics
February 22, 2010	Antonio Anderson	10-Day	Rio Grande Valley Vipers (D-League)
March 16, 2010	Mustafa Shakur	10-Day	Tulsa 66ers (D-League)
March 31, 2010	Mustafa Shakur	Standard	Tulsa 66ers (D-League)

==== Subtractions ====
Date	Player	Reason left	New team
July 1, 2009	Robert Swift	Free Agency	Bakersfield Jam (D-League)
July 1, 2009	Malik Rose	Free Agency	N/A
July 17, 2009	Earl Watson	Waived	Indiana Pacers
September 17, 2009	Desmond Mason	Free Agency	Sacramento Kings
November 25, 2009	Ryan Bowen	Waived	N/A
December 22, 2009	Shaun Livingston	Waived	Washington Wizards
December 22, 2009	Mike Wilks	Waived	(Poland) Asseco Prokom Gdynia
February 22, 2010	Matt Harpring	Waived	N/A
March 25, 2010	Mustafa Shakur	Waived	Oklahoma City Thunder
