= 2012–13 Washington Wizards season =

NBA professional basketball team season

- Head coach: Randy Wittman
- Owners: Ted Leonsis
- Arena: Verizon Center

Results
- Record: 29–53 (.354)
- Place: Division: 3rd (Southeast); Conference: 11th (Eastern)
- Playoff finish: Did not qualify
- Stats at Basketball Reference

Local media
- Television: CSN Mid-Atlantic, The CW Washington, TBD TV
- Radio: 106.7 The Fan

The 2012–13 Washington Wizards season was the 52nd season of the franchise in the National Basketball Association (NBA), and the 40th in the Washington, D.C. area. Jason Collins was on this team when he became the first active NBA player to publicly come out as gay.

== Key dates ==
- June 28: The 2012 NBA draft took place in Newark, New Jersey.
- July 1: The free agency period begun.

== Draft picks ==
Round	PickO	Player	Position	Nationality	College
1	3	Bradley Beal	SG	United States	Florida
2	32	Tomáš Satoranský	SG	Czech Republic	Liga ACB (Spain)

== Roster ==
2012–13 Washington Wizards roster
Players

Pos.	No.	Player	Height	Weight	DOB	From
F	1	Trevor Ariza	6 ft 8 in (2.03 m)	210 lb (95 kg)	1985-06-30	UCLA
G	28	Leandro Barbosa	6 ft 3 in (1.91 m)	194 lb (88 kg)	1982-11-28	Brazil
G	3	Bradley Beal	6 ft 3 in (1.91 m)	207 lb (94 kg)	1993-06-28	Florida
F	35	Trevor Booker	6 ft 8 in (2.03 m)	240 lb (109 kg)	1987–11–25	Clemson
C	98	Jason Collins	7 ft 0 in (2.13 m)	255 lb (116 kg)	1978–12–02	Stanford
F	20	Cartier Martin	6 ft 7 in (2.01 m)	220 lb (100 kg)	1984-11-20	Kansas State
F/C	42	Nenê	6 ft 11 in (2.11 m)	250 lb (113 kg)	1982–09–13	Brazil
C	50	Emeka Okafor	6 ft 10 in (2.08 m)	255 lb (116 kg)	1982-09-28	Connecticut
G	12	A.J. Price	6 ft 2 in (1.88 m)	185 lb (84 kg)	1986-10-07	Connecticut
F/C	13	Kevin Seraphin	6 ft 9 in (2.06 m)	275 lb (125 kg)	1989–12–07	France
F	31	Chris Singleton	6 ft 8 in (2.03 m)	230 lb (104 kg)	1989–11–21	Florida State
G	17	Garrett Temple	6 ft 6 in (1.98 m)	195 lb (88 kg)	1986–05–08	LSU
F	24	Jan Vesely	6 ft 11 in (2.11 m)	240 lb (109 kg)	1990–04–24	Czech Republic
G	2	John Wall	6 ft 4 in (1.93 m)	195 lb (88 kg)	1990–09–06	Kentucky
F	9	Martell Webster	6 ft 7 in (2.01 m)	230 lb (104 kg)	1986–12–04	Seattle Preparatory School

Coaches
Head coach
- Randy Wittman
Assistant(s)
- Don Newman
- Don Zierden
- Sam Cassell
- Ryan Saunders
- Jerry Sichting

Legend
- (DP) Unsigned draft pick
- (FA) Free agent
- (S) Suspended
- Injured

== Pre-season ==
2012 pre-season game log
Pre-season: 3–5 (home: 0–1; road: 3–4)

Game	Date	Team	Score	High points	High rebounds	High assists	Location Attendance	Record
1	October 7	@ Charlotte	L 88–100	Bradley Beal, Martell Webster (18)	Chris Singleton (9)	Shelvin Mack (7)	Time Warner Cable Arena; 6,213	0–1
2	October 11	New York	L 101–108	Jordan Crawford (17)	Martell Webster (10)	Bradley Beal, Jannero Pargo (5)	Verizon Center; 9,627	0–2
3	October 13	@ Cleveland	W 99–95	Three players (14)	Shavlik Randolph (9)	Jordan Crawford (7)	Quicken Loans Arena; 10,140	1–2
4	October 15	@ Brooklyn	L 88–98	Martell Webster (18)	Emeka Okafor (6)	Three players (3)	Barclays Center; 14,219	1–3
5	October 17	@ Toronto	L 101–104	Trevor Booker (12)	Earl Barron (8)	A. J. Price (8)	Air Canada Centre; 11,750	1–4
6	October 20	@ Milwaukee	W 102–94	Trevor Booker (22)	Trevor Booker, Emeka Okafor (7)	A. J. Price (11)	BMO Harris Bradley Center; 9,967	2–4
7	October 24	@ Miami	W 101–94	Martell Webster (23)	Jan Veselý (11)	Jannero Pargo (6)	Sprint Center; 16,143	3–4
8	October 26	@ San Antonio	L 85–100	A. J. Price, Jan Veselý (13)	Earl Barron (10)	Jordan Crawford, Shelvin Mack (4)	AT&T Center; 17,842	3–5

2012–13 season schedule

== Regular season ==
=== Season standings ===
Southeast Division	W	L	PCT	GB	Home	Road	Div	GP
z-Miami Heat	66	16	.805	–	37–4	29–12	15–1	82
x-Atlanta Hawks	44	38	.537	22	25–16	19–22	11–5	82
Washington Wizards	29	53	.354	37	22–19	7–34	5–11	82
Charlotte Bobcats	21	61	.256	45	15–26	6–35	6–10	82
Orlando Magic	20	62	.244	46	12–29	8–33	3–13	82

Eastern Conference
#	Team	W	L	PCT	GB	GP
1	z-Miami Heat *	66	16	.805	–	82
2	y-New York Knicks *	54	28	.659	12.0	82
3	y-Indiana Pacers *	49	32	.605	16.5	81
4	x-Brooklyn Nets	49	33	.598	17.0	82
5	x-Chicago Bulls	45	37	.549	21.0	82
6	x-Atlanta Hawks	44	38	.537	22.0	82
7	x-Boston Celtics	41	40	.506	24.5	81
8	x-Milwaukee Bucks	38	44	.463	28.0	82
9	Philadelphia 76ers	34	48	.415	32.0	82
10	Toronto Raptors	34	48	.415	32.0	82
11	Washington Wizards	29	53	.354	37.0	82
12	Detroit Pistons	29	53	.354	37.0	82
13	Cleveland Cavaliers	24	58	.293	42.0	82
14	Charlotte Bobcats	21	61	.256	45.0	82
15	Orlando Magic	20	62	.244	46.0	82

=== Game log ===
2012–13 game log
Total: 29–53 (Home: 22–19; Road: 7–34)
October: 0–1 (home: 0–0; road: 0–1)

Game	Date	Team	Score	High points	High rebounds	High assists	Location Attendance	Record
1	October 30	@ Cleveland	L 84–94	Jordan Crawford (11)	Earl Barron (8)	A.J. Price (6)	Quicken Loans Arena; 20,562	0–1

November : 1–12 (home: 1–6; road: 0–6)

Game	Date	Team	Score	High points	High rebounds	High assists	Location Attendance	Record
2	November 3	Boston	L 86–89	Jordan Crawford (21)	Trevor Booker (10)	Pargo, Price & Webster (4)	Verizon Center; 20,308	0–2
3	November 7	@ Boston	L 94–100	Beal, Seraphin & Webster (16)	Kevin Seraphin (9)	A.J. Price (7)	TD Garden; 18,624	0–3
4	November 9	Milwaukee	L 91–101	Bradley Beal (22)	Trevor Ariza (8)	A.J. Price (9)	Verizon Center; 14,531	0–4
5	November 10	@ Indiana	L 85–89	Okafor & Beal (17)	Emeka Okafor (8)	A.J. Price (14)	Conseco Fieldhouse; 12,036	0–5
6	November 13	@ Charlotte	L 76–92	Trevor Ariza (19)	Crawford & Okafor (9)	A.J. Price (6)	Time Warner Cable Arena; 11,139	0–6
7	November 14	@ Dallas	L 101–107	Jordan Crawford (21)	Trevor Booker (6)	Jordan Crawford (7)	American Airlines Center; 19,560	0–7
8	November 17	Utah	L 76–83	Jordan Crawford (20)	Emeka Okafor (14)	Jordan Crawford (8)	Verizon Center; 16,210	0–8
9	November 19	Indiana	L 89–96	Bradley Beal (18)	Trevor Booker (8)	Shaun Livingston (4)	Verizon Center; 14,426	0–9
10	November 21	@ Atlanta	L 100–101	Kevin Seraphin (21)	Trevor Ariza (15)	A.J. Price (7)	Philips Arena; 11,338	0–10
11	November 24	Charlotte	L 106–108	Martell Webster (21)	Chris Singleton (12)	Jordan Crawford (6)	Verizon Center; 13,077	0–11
12	November 26	San Antonio	L 92–118	Jordan Crawford (19)	Kevin Seraphin (7)	A.J. Price (7)	Verizon Center; 13,879	0–12
13	November 28	Portland	W 84–82	Jordan Crawford (19)	Kevin Seraphin (10)	A.J. Price (6)	Verizon Center; 14,114	1–12
14	November 30	@ New York	L 87–108	Jordan Crawford (17)	Kevin Seraphin (10)	Jordan Crawford (4)	Madison Square Garden; 19,033	1–13

December : 3–11 (home: 2–5; road: 1–6)

Game	Date	Team	Score	High points	High rebounds	High assists	Location Attendance	Record
15	December 4	Miami	W 105–101	Jordan Crawford (22)	Kevin Seraphin (10)	Jordan Crawford (6)	Verizon Center; 17,761	2–13
16	December 7	@ Atlanta	L 95–104	Kevin Seraphin (19)	Kevin Seraphin (7)	A.J. Price (6)	Philips Arena; 13,067	2–14
17	December 8	Golden State	L 97–101	Jordan Crawford (22)	Jordan Crawford (7)	Jordan Crawford (8)	Verizon Center; 15,176	2–15
18	December 11	@ New Orleans	W 77–70	Jordan Crawford (26)	Nenê (10)	Beal & Crawford (20)	New Orleans Arena; 10,076	3–15
19	December 12	@ Houston	L 93–99	Bradley Beal (20)	Nenê (9)	Bradley Beal (6)	Toyota Center; 13,351	3–16
20	December 14	L. A. Lakers	L 96–102	Cartier Martin (21)	Martin, Nenê, & Seraphin (8)	Jordan Crawford (6)	Verizon Center; 20,308	3–17
21	December 15	@ Miami	L 72–102	Bradley Beal (19)	Emeka Okafor (10)	Jordan Crawford (6)	American Airlines Arena; 19,724	3–18
22	December 18	Atlanta	L 95–100	Jordan Crawford (27)	Earl Barron (14)	Jordan Crawford (11)	Verizon Center; 15,123	3–19
23	December 19	@ Orlando	L 83–90	Nenê (20)	Emeka Okafor (12)	Jordan Crawford (6)	Amway Center; 16,893	3-20
24	December 21	@ Detroit	L 68–100	Jordan Crawford (20)	Martell Webster (9)	Jordan Crawford (7)	The Palace of Auburn Hills; 13,489	3-21
25	December 22	Detroit	L 87–96	Jordan Crawford (21)	Emeka Okafor (14)	Jordan Crawford (6)	Verizon Center; 13,104	3-22
26	December 26	Cleveland	L 84–87	Crawford & Okafor (17)	Okafor & Webster (10)	Shelvin Mack (7)	Verizon Center; 13,846	3-23
27	December 28	Orlando	W 105–97	Jordan Crawford (27)	Nenê & Okafor (11)	Crawford & Temple (6)	Verizon Center; 15,789	4-23
28	December 29	@ Chicago	L 77–87	Bradley Beal (14)	Emeka Okafor (18)	Mack & Temple (5)	United Center; 22,447	4–24

January : 7–9 (home: 5–3; road: 2–6)

Game	Date	Team	Score	High points	High rebounds	High assists	Location Attendance	Record
29	January 1	Dallas	L 94–103	Bradley Beal (22)	Emeka Okafor (11)	Shelvin Mack (6)	Verizon Center; 14,456	4-25
30	January 2	@ Indiana	L 81–89	Jordan Crawford (20)	Okafor & Seraphin (9)	Crawford & Temple (7)	Conseco Fieldhouse; 11,182	4-26
31	January 4	Brooklyn	L 113–115	Bradley Beal (24)	Okafor & Temple (7)	Garrett Temple (11)	Verizon Center; 16,006	4-27
32	January 6	@ Miami	L 71–99	Kevin Seraphin (14)	Emeka Okafor (9)	Garrett Temple (7)	American Airlines Arena; 20,228	4-28
33	January 7	Oklahoma City	W 101–99	Beal & Webster (22)	Emeka Okafor (12)	A.J. Price (5)	Verizon Center; 16,917	5-28
34	January 12	Atlanta	W 93–83	Beal & Price (16)	Nenê & Okafor (10)	John Wall (4)	Verizon Center; 15,331	6-28
35	January 14	Orlando	W 120–91	Emeka Okafor (19)	Emeka Okafor (11)	Wall & Price (6)	Verizon Center; 14,648	7-28
36	January 16	@ Sacramento	L 94–95	Bradley Beal (26)	Nenê & Webster (9)	John Wall (10)	Power Balance Pavilion; 11,611	7-29
37	January 18	@ Denver	W 112–108	Bradley Beal (23)	Trevor Booker (8)	John Wall (12)	Pepsi Center; 16,523	8-29
38	January 19	@ L. A. Clippers	L 87–94	John Wall (24)	Emeka Okafor (12)	John Wall (6)	Staples Center; 19,188	8-30
39	January 21	@ Portland	W 98–95	Nenê & Webster (24)	Emeka Okafor (13)	Martell Webster (6)	Rose Garden; 17,366	9-30
40	January 23	@ Utah	L 88–92	Martell Webster (15)	Emeka Okafor (17)	John Wall (8)	EnergySolutions Arena; 18,158	9-31
41	January 25	Minnesota	W 114–101	Jordan Crawford (19)	Emeka Okafor (8)	John Wall (5)	Verizon Center; 14,095	10–31
42	January 26	Chicago	W 86–73	Nenê (16)	Emeka Okafor (16)	John Wall (7)	Verizon Center; 20,308	11–31
43	January 28	Sacramento	L 94–96	Emeka Okafor (23)	Emeka Okafor (15)	John Wall (6)	Verizon Center; 13,422	11–32
44	January 30	@ Philadelphia	L 84–92	Nenê (16)	Emeka Okafor (17)	John Wall (6)	Wells Fargo Center; 15,101	11-33

February : 7–5 (home: 5–2; road: 2–3)

Game	Date	Team	Score	High points	High rebounds	High assists	Location Attendance	Record
45	February 1	@ Memphis	L 76–85	Nenê (14)	Emeka Okafor (10)	Wall & Nenê (6)	FedExForum; 15,017	11–34
46	February 2	@ San Antonio	L 86–96	John Wall (21)	Emeka Okafor (9)	John Wall (9)	AT&T Center; 18,581	11–35
47	February 4	L. A. Clippers	W 98–90	Martell Webster (21)	Emeka Okafor (14)	John Wall (8)	Verizon Center; 16,246	12–35
48	February 6	New York	W 106–96	John Wall (21)	Nenê (10)	John Wall (9)	Verizon Center; 18,263	13–35
49	February 8	Brooklyn	W 89–74	Nenê (20)	Nenê (11)	John Wall (9)	Verizon Center; 19,614	14–35
50	February 11	@ Milwaukee	W 102–90	Bradley Beal (28)	Nenê (13)	John Wall (10)	Bradley Center; 13,842	15–35
51	February 13	@ Detroit	L 85–96	Emeka Okafor (20)	Emeka Okafor (9)	John Wall (9)	The Palace of Auburn Hills; 11,095	15–36
All-Star Break
52	February 19	Toronto	L 88–96	Bradley Beal (25)	Emeka Okafor (9)	John Wall (6)	Verizon Center; 13,923	15–37
53	February 22	Denver	W 119–113	Emeka Okafor (17)	Emeka Okafor (13)	John Wall (10)	Verizon Center; 16,527	16–37
54	February 23	Houston	W 105–103	Bradley Beal (21)	Emeka Okafor (11)	John Wall (11)	Verizon Center; 20,308	17–37
55	February 25	@ Toronto	W 90–84	Bradley Beal (20)	Emeka Okafor (13)	John Wall (7)	Air Canada Centre; 16,705	18-37
56	February 27	Detroit	L 95–96	Trevor Ariza (22)	Chris Singleton (8)	A.J. Price (8)	Verizon Center; 14,298	18–38

March : 9–8 (home: 7–1; road: 2–7)

Game	Date	Team	Score	High points	High rebounds	High assists	Location Attendance	Record
57	March 1	New York	L 88–96	Bradley Beal (29)	Bradley Beal (11)	John Wall (6)	Verizon Center; 20,308	18–39
58	March 3	Philadelphia	W 90–87	Martell Webster (16)	Emeka Okafor (16)	John Wall (6)	Verizon Center; 17,370	19–39
59	March 6	@ Minnesota	L 82–87	John Wall (19)	Emeka Okafor (14)	John Wall (7)	Target Center; 13,233	19–40
60	March 8	@ Brooklyn	L 78–95	John Wall (16)	Emeka Okafor (9)	A.J. Price (4)	Barclays Center; 17,732	19–41
61	March 9	Charlotte	W 104–87	Trevor Ariza (26)	Emeka Okafor (10)	John Wall (6)	Verizon Center; 16,357	20–41
62	March 12	@ Cleveland	L 90–95	John Wall (27)	Emeka Okafor (11)	John Wall (14)	Quicken Loans Arena; 14,689	20–42
63	March 13	Milwaukee	W 106–93	John Wall (23)	Nenê (13)	John Wall (10)	Verizon Center; 14,506	21–42
64	March 15	New Orleans	W 96–87	John Wall (29)	Trevor Booker (13)	John Wall (9)	Verizon Center; 14,942	22–42
65	March 16	Phoenix	W 127–105	Martell Webster (34)	Emeka Okafor (10)	John Wall (11)	Verizon Center; 16,882	23–42
66	March 18	@ Charlotte	L 114–119	John Wall (25)	Emeka Okafor (9)	Nenê (7)	Time Warner Cable Arena; 10,141	23–43
67	March 20	@ Phoenix	W 88–79	John Wall (19)	Nenê (8)	John Wall (8)	US Airways Center; 14,819	24–43
68	March 22	@ L. A. Lakers	W 103–100	Trevor Ariza (25)	Garrett Temple (6)	John Wall (16)	Staples Center; 18,997	25–43
69	March 23	@ Golden State	L 92–101	Cartier Martin (23)	Kevin Seraphin (6)	Garrett Temple (6)	Oracle Arena; 19,596	25–44
70	March 25	Memphis	W 107–94	John Wall (47)	Emeka Okafor (9)	John Wall (8)	Verizon Center; 17,868	26–44
71	March 27	@ Oklahoma City	L 80–103	John Wall (18)	Emeka Okafor (10)	John Wall (12)	Chesapeake Energy Arena; 18,203	26–45
72	March 29	@ Orlando	L 92–97	John Wall (35)	Emeka Okafor (13)	Martell Webster & Garrett Temple (3)	Amway Center; 17,998	26–46
73	March 31	Toronto	W 109–92	Bradley Beal (24)	Emeka Okafor (10)	John Wall (10)	Verizon Center; 14,360	27–46

April : 2–5 (home: 2–2; road: 0–3)

Game	Date	Team	Score	High points	High rebounds	High assists	Location Attendance	Record
74	April 2	Chicago	W 90–86	John Wall (27)	Emeka Okafor (9)	John Wall (9)	Verizon Center; 17,319	28–46
75	April 3	@ Toronto	L 78–88	John Wall (20)	Emeka Okafor (8)	John Wall (5)	Air Canada Centre; 15,783	28–47
76	April 6	Indiana	W 104–85	John Wall (37)	Emeka Okafor (9)	John Wall (5)	Verizon Center; 19,360	29–47
77	April 7	@ Boston	L 96–107	John Wall (16)	Emeka Okafor (9)	John Wall (10)	TD Garden; 18,624	29–48
78	April 9	@ New York	L 99–120	John Wall (33)	Emeka Okafor (8)	Nenê (5)	Madison Square Garden; 19,033	29–49
79	April 10	Miami	L 98–103	A.J. Price (23)	John Wall (9)	John Wall (11)	Verizon Center; 20,308	29–50
80	April 12	Philadelphia	L 86–97	John Wall (24)	Nenê (10)	John Wall (7)	Verizon Center; 18,476	29–51
81	April 15	@ Brooklyn	L 101–106	John Wall (18)	Trevor Booker (13)	John Wall (12)	Barclays Center; 16,774	29–52
82	April 17	@ Chicago	L 92–95	A.J. Price (24)	Kevin Seraphin (9)	Garrett Temple (5)	United Center; 22421	29–53

2012–13 season schedule

== Injuries and surgeries ==
On September 28, 2012, the Wizards announced that John Wall would be sidelined for about eight weeks after being diagnosed with the early stages of what could become a stress fracture in his left knee. No surgery was required, but Wall had to begin rehabilitation immediately.

== Player statistics ==
Legend
GP	Games played	GS	Games started	MPG	Minutes per game
FG%	Field-goal percentage	3P%	3-point field-goal percentage	FT%	Free-throw percentage
RPG	Rebounds per game	APG	Assists per game	SPG	Steals per game
BPG	Blocks per game	PPG	Points per game

=== Regular season ===
Washington Wizards statistics
Player	GP	GS	MPG	FG%	3P%	FT%	RPG	APG	SPG	BPG	PPG
Emeka Okafor	79	77	26.0	.477		.571	8.8	1.2	.6	1.0	9.7
Kevin Séraphin	79	8	21.8	.461		.693	4.4	.7	.3	.7	9.1
Martell Webster	76	62	28.9	.442	.422	.848	3.9	1.9	.6	.2	11.4
Nenê	61	49	27.2	.480	.000	.729	6.7	2.9	.9	.6	12.6
A. J. Price	57	22	22.4	.390	.350	.790	2.0	3.6	.6	.1	7.7
Chris Singleton	57	11	16.2	.382	.194	.571	3.2	.6	.7	.4	4.1
Bradley Beal	56	46	31.2	.410	.386	.786	3.8	2.4	.9	.5	13.9
Trevor Ariza	56	15	26.3	.417	.364	.821	4.8	2.0	1.3	.4	9.5
Garrett Temple	51	36	22.7	.407	.325	.703	2.4	2.3	1.0	.3	5.1
Jan Veselý	51	4	11.8	.500	.000	.308	2.4	.5	.3	.3	2.5
John Wall	49	42	32.7	.441	.267	.804	4.0	7.6	1.3	.8	18.5
Trevor Booker	48	14	18.5	.491	.000	.556	5.0	.8	.7	.3	5.3
Jordan Crawford^{†}	43	12	26.2	.415	.345	.821	3.1	3.7	.6	.1	13.2
Cartier Martin	41	3	16.9	.381	.397	.714	2.4	.5	.5	.1	6.6
Shaun Livingston^{†}	17	4	18.8	.364	.000	1.000	2.2	2.2	.6	.1	3.7
Earl Barron^{†}	11	1	11.1	.351		.400	3.9	.3	.5	.5	2.5
Shelvin Mack^{†}	7	2	20.1	.400	.308	.500	2.3	3.3	.9	.0	5.3
Jannero Pargo^{†}	7	0	14.6	.250	.150	1.000	.9	2.0	.0	.1	3.0
Jason Collins^{†}	6	2	9.0	.167		1.000	1.3	.3	.3	.7	.7

- ^{†} Denotes player spent time with another team in the season. Stats reflect time with the Wizards only.

== Transactions ==
=== Overview ===
Players Added

Via draft

- Bradley Beal

Via free agency

- Earl Barron
- Steven Gray
- Jannero Pargo
- A. J. Price
- Shavlik Randolph
- Martell Webster

Via trade

- Trevor Ariza
- Emeka Okafor
Players Lost

Via trade

- Rashard Lewis

Via free agency

- Morris Almond
- Othyus Jeffers
- Roger Mason, Jr.
- James Singleton

Waived

- Andray Blatche

=== Trades ===
June 20, 2012	To Washington Wizards Trevor Ariza; Emeka Okafor	To New Orleans Hornets Rashard Lewis; The 46th pick in 2012

=== Free agents ===
Additions
Player	Date signed	Former team
Cartier Martin	July 12	Washington Wizards (re-signed)
A. J. Price	July 24	Indiana Pacers
Martell Webster	August 29	Minnesota Timberwolves
Brian Cook	September 19	Washington Wizards (re-signed)
Earl Barron	September 19	Atléticos de San Germán (Puerto Rico)
Steven Gray	September 19	BK Ventspils (Latvia)
Shavlik Randolph	September 19	Piratas de Quebradillas (Puerto Rico)
Jannero Pargo	October 1	Atlanta Hawks

Subtractions
Player	Date signed	New team
Roger Mason, Jr.	August 3	New Orleans Hornets
Morris Almond	August 19	Red Star Belgrade (Serbia)
James Singleton	September 18	Xinjiang Flying Tigers (China)
Othyus Jeffers	October 1	Phoenix Suns
