= 2009–10 Portland Trail Blazers season =

NBA professional basketball team season

- Head coach: Nate McMillan
- General manager: Kevin Pritchard; Tom Penn (assistant)
- Owner: Paul Allen
- Arena: Rose Garden

Results
- Record: 50–32 (.610)
- Place: Division: 3rd (Northwest); Conference: 6th (Western)
- Playoff finish: First round (lost to Suns 2–4)
- Stats at Basketball Reference

Local media
- Television: CSN Northwest; KGW
- Radio: KXTG

The 2009–10 Portland Trail Blazers season was the 40th season of the franchise in the National Basketball Association (NBA). In the playoffs, the Trail Blazers lost to the Phoenix Suns in six games in the First Round.

The team's roster has been featured in each NBA 2K game since NBA 2K20.

== Key dates ==
- June 25 – The 2009 NBA draft took place in New York City.
- July 8 – The free agency period started.
- September 28 – Training camp begins
- October 6 – First preseason game
- October 14 – Commemorative 40-year anniversary game at Memorial Coliseum
- October 27 – First regular-season game
- March 16 – Tom Penn is relieved of his assistant general manager duties by owner Paul Allen.
- April 18 – Blazers begin playoff series with the Phoenix Suns.
- April 29 – Phoenix Suns defeat the Blazers in Game 6 of the playoff series.
- June 24, 2010 – Kevin Pritchard is relieved of his general manager duties by owner Paul Allen.

== NBA draft ==
Round	Pick	Player	Position	Nationality	College / Club Team
1	22	Víctor Claver	Forward	Spain	Valencia (Spain)
2	33	Dante Cunningham	Power Forward	United States	Villanova
2	38	Jon Brockman (traded to Sacramento)	Power Forward	United States	Washington
2	55	Patrick Mills	Point Guard	Australia	Saint Mary's

=== Free agency ===
- Signed Andre Miller to a three-year deal
- Signed Juwan Howard to a one-year deal

== Roster ==
2009–10 Portland Trail Blazers roster
Players

Pos.	No.	Player	Height	Weight	DOB	From
F/C	12	LaMarcus Aldridge	6 ft 11 in (2.11 m)	240 lb (109 kg)		Texas
F	88	Nicolas Batum	6 ft 8 in (2.03 m)	200 lb (91 kg)		France
G	4	Jerryd Bayless	6 ft 3 in (1.91 m)	200 lb (91 kg)		Arizona
F/C	21	Marcus Camby	6 ft 11 in (2.11 m)	235 lb (107 kg)		UMass
F	33	Dante Cunningham	6 ft 8 in (2.03 m)	230 lb (104 kg)		Villanova
G	27	Travis Diener	6 ft 1 in (1.85 m)	175 lb (79 kg)		Marquette
G	5	Rudy Fernández	6 ft 6 in (1.98 m)	185 lb (84 kg)		Spain
F/C	6	Juwan Howard	6 ft 9 in (2.06 m)	253 lb (115 kg)		Michigan
G	24	Andre Miller	6 ft 2 in (1.88 m)	200 lb (91 kg)		Utah
G	8	Patrick Mills	6 ft 0 in (1.83 m)	185 lb (84 kg)		Saint Mary's
C	52	Greg Oden	7 ft 0 in (2.13 m)	285 lb (129 kg)		Ohio State
F	31	Jeff Pendergraph	6 ft 10 in (2.08 m)	240 lb (109 kg)		Arizona State
C	10	Joel Przybilla	7 ft 1 in (2.16 m)	245 lb (111 kg)		Minnesota
G	7	Brandon Roy	6 ft 6 in (1.98 m)	211 lb (96 kg)		Washington
G/F	23	Martell Webster	6 ft 7 in (2.01 m)	235 lb (107 kg)		Seattle Prep HS (WA)

Coaches
Head coach
- Nate McMillan
Assistant(s)
- Dean Demopoulos
- Maurice Lucas
- Monty Williams
- Joe Prunty
- Kaleb Canales

Legend
- (DP) Unsigned draft pick
- (FA) Free agent
- (S) Suspended
- Injured

== Pre-season ==
As part of the team's 40th-year celebration, the Blazers played a pre-season game at Memorial Coliseum on October 14, 2009, against the Phoenix Suns. Team founder Harry Glickman, former players Jerome Kersey, Terry Porter, and Bob Gross, as well as broadcaster Bill Schonely attended the game. The Suns defeated the Blazers, 110–104 with 11,740 tickets sold. All tickets for this game were $19.70 to represent the team's inaugural 1970 season.

2009 Pre-season game log: 4–4 (home: 2–2; road: 2–2)
#	Date	Opponent	Score	Attendance	Record	Recap	Time (PST)	TV
1	October 6	vs. Sacramento Kings	W 98–86		1–0		7pm	n/a
2	October 7	at Sacramento Kings	W 89–86		2–0		7pm	n/a
3	October 9	at Los Angeles Clippers	L 85–97		2–1		7:30 pm	n/a
4	October 14	vs. Phoenix Suns	L 104–110		2–2		7pm	n/a
5	October 15	at Utah Jazz	L 96–99		2–3		6pm	n/a
6	October 18	vs. Denver Nuggets	W 98–96		3–3		6pm	n/a
7	October 20	vs. Utah Jazz	L 97–108		3–4		7pm	n/a
8	October 22	at Phoenix Suns	W 113–93		4–4		7pm	n/a

== Regular season ==
=== Standings ===
Northwest Division	W	L	PCT	GB	Home	Road	Div
y-Denver Nuggets	53	29	.646	–	34–7	19–22	12–4
x-Utah Jazz	53	29	.646	–	32–9	21–20	8–8
x-Portland Trail Blazers	50	32	.610	3	26–15	24–17	8–8
x-Oklahoma City Thunder	50	32	.610	3	27–14	23–18	9–7
Minnesota Timberwolves	15	67	.183	38	10–31	5–36	3–13

#	Western Conference				
#	Team	W	L	PCT	GB
1	c-Los Angeles Lakers	57	25	.695	–
2	y-Dallas Mavericks	55	27	.671	2
3	x-Phoenix Suns	54	28	.659	3
4	y-Denver Nuggets	53	29	.646	4
5	x-Utah Jazz	53	29	.646	4
6	x-Portland Trail Blazers	50	32	.610	7
7	x-San Antonio Spurs	50	32	.610	7
8	x-Oklahoma City Thunder	50	32	.610	7
9	Houston Rockets	42	40	.512	15
10	Memphis Grizzlies	40	42	.488	17
11	New Orleans Hornets	37	45	.451	20
12	Los Angeles Clippers	29	53	.354	28
13	Golden State Warriors	26	56	.317	31
14	Sacramento Kings	25	57	.305	32
15	Minnesota Timberwolves	15	67	.183	42

=== Game log ===
2009–10 game log
Total: 50–32 (home: 26–15; road: 24–17)
October: 1–2 (home: 1–1; road: 0–1)

Game	Date	Team	Score	High points	High rebounds	High assists	Location Attendance	Record
1	October 27	Houston	W 96–87	Travis Outlaw (23)	Greg Oden (12)	Andre Miller (7)	Rose Garden; 20,403	1–0
2	October 29	Denver	L 94–97	Brandon Roy (30)	Greg Oden (9)	Brandon Roy, Andre Miller (5)	Rose Garden; 20,218	1–1
3	October 31	@ Houston	L 107–111	Brandon Roy (42)	Greg Oden (9)	Steve Blake (6)	Toyota Center; 18,100	1–2

November: 10–5 (home: 5–3; road: 5–2)

Game	Date	Team	Score	High points	High rebounds	High assists	Location Attendance	Record
4	November 1	@ Oklahoma City	W 83–74	Steve Blake (18)	Greg Oden (10)	Brandon Roy (5)	Ford Center; 16,920	2–2
5	November 3	Atlanta	L 91–97	LaMarcus Aldridge (20)	LaMarcus Aldridge (14)	Andre Miller (11)	Rose Garden; 20,325	2–3
6	November 6	San Antonio	W 96–84	Brandon Roy (24)	Joel Przybilla (13)	Andre Miller (4)	Rose Garden; 20,498	3–3
7	November 8	Minnesota	W 116–93	Andre Miller (21)	Joel Przybilla (13)	Brandon Roy (7)	Rose Garden; 20,306	4–3
8	November 10	@ Memphis	W 93–79	Brandon Roy (20)	LaMarcus Aldridge (12)	Brandon Roy, Andre Miller (7)	FedEx Forum; 10,589	5–3
9	November 11	@ Minnesota	W 107–84	Martell Webster (16)	Joel Przybilla, Greg Oden (11)	Brandon Roy, Andre Miller (10)	Target Center; 13,555	6–3
10	November 13	@ New Orleans	W 86–78	LaMarcus Aldridge (20)	LaMarcus Aldridge (13)	Brandon Roy (6)	New Orleans Arena; 14,742	7–3
11	November 14	@ Charlotte	W 80–74	Brandon Roy (25)	LaMarcus Aldridge, Rudy Fernandez, Brandon Roy (7)	Brandon Roy (5)	Time Warner Cable Arena; 15,872	8–3
12	November 16	@ Atlanta	L 95–99	Rudy Fernandez (19)	LaMarcus Aldridge, Brandon Roy (9)	Steve Blake (11)	Philips Arena; 12,977	8–4
13	November 18	Detroit	W 87–81	Brandon Roy, LaMarcus Aldridge (19)	Greg Oden (10)	Andre Miller (11)	Rose Garden; 20,391	9–4
14	November 20	@ Golden State	L 94–108	Rudy Fernandez (19)	Joel Przybilla (9)	Rudy Fernandez, Steve Blake (5)	Oracle Arena; 18,630	9–5
15	November 21	Minnesota	W 106–78	Martell Webster (21)	Martell Webster (13)	Steve Blake (9)	Rose Garden; 20,453	10–5
16	November 23	Chicago	W 122–98	Greg Oden, LaMarcus Aldridge (24)	LaMarcus Aldridge (13)	Brandon Roy (7)	Rose Garden; 20,383	11–5
17	November 25	New Jersey	W 93–83	Greg Oden (18)	Joel Przybilla (10)	Andre Miller (6)	Rose Garden; 20,322	12–5
18	November 27	Memphis	L 96–106	Brandon Roy (26)	Greg Oden (10)	Brandon Roy (9)	Rose Garden; 20,540	12–6
19	November 28	@ Utah	L 92–108	Brandon Roy (19)	Dante Cunningham, Joel Przybilla, Martell Webster (5)	Brandon Roy, Steve Blake (4)	EnergySolutions Arena; 18,051	12–7

December: 9–6 (home: 6–2; road: 3–4)

Game	Date	Team	Score	High points	High rebounds	High assists	Location Attendance	Record
20	December 1	Miami	L 100–107	Brandon Roy (25)	Greg Oden (20)	Andre Miller (6)	Rose Garden; 20,417	12–8
21	December 5	Houston	W 90–89	Brandon Roy (28)	Joel Przybilla (12)	Andre Miller, Steve Blake, Brandon Roy, LaMarcus Aldridge (3)	Rose Garden; 20,555	13–8
22	December 7	@ New York	L 84–93	Brandon Roy (27)	LaMarcus Aldridge (13)	Steve Blake (4)	Madison Square Garden; 19,763	13–9
23	December 9	@ Indiana	W 102–91	Brandon Roy (29)	LaMarcus Aldridge, Joel Przybilla (8)	Steve Blake (6)	Conseco Fieldhouse; 11,487	14–9
24	December 11	@ Cleveland	L 99–104	Brandon Roy (23)	Joel Przybilla (11)	Steve Blake (8)	Quicken Loans Arena; 20,562	14–10
25	December 12	@ Milwaukee	L 101–108 (2OT)	LaMarcus Aldridge (31)	LaMarcus Aldridge (11)	Andre Miller (7)	Bradley Center; 15,973	14–11
26	December 15	Sacramento	W 95–88	Brandon Roy, LaMarcus Aldridge (25)	Joel Przybilla (10)	Brandon Roy (10)	Rose Garden; 20,588	15–11
27	December 17	Phoenix	W 105–102	Jerryd Bayless (29)	Joel Przybilla (10)	Andre Miller (5)	Rose Garden; 20,559	16–11
28	December 19	@ Orlando	L 83–92	Brandon Roy (33)	Joel Przybilla (10)	Miller, Roy, Webster, Blake, Bayless, Howard, Aldridge (1)	Amway Arena; 17,461	16–12
29	December 20	@ Miami	W 102–95	Brandon Roy (28)	Joel Przybilla (12)	Brandon Roy (8)	American Airlines Arena; 16,500	17–12
30	December 22	@ Dallas	W 85–81	Brandon Roy (23)	LaMarcus Aldridge (12)	Brandon Roy (6)	American Airlines Center; 19,863	18–12
31	December 23	@ San Antonio	W 98–94	Jerryd Bayless (31)	Juwan Howard (12)	Jerryd Bayless (7)	AT&T Center; 18,581	19–12
32	December 25	Denver	W 107–96	Brandon Roy (41)	LaMarcus Aldridge (13)	Andre Miller (8)	Rose Garden; 20,664	20–12
33	December 28	Philadelphia	L 93–104	Brandon Roy (24)	LaMarcus Aldridge (12)	Andre Miller (7)	Rose Garden; 20,640	20–13
34	December 30	Los Angeles Clippers	W 103–99	Brandon Roy (25)	Jeff Pendergraph (13)	Jerryd Bayless (8)	Rose Garden; 20,505	21–13

January: 5–8 (home: 4–4; road: 1–4)

Game	Date	Team	Score	High points	High rebounds	High assists	Location Attendance	Record
35	January 2	Golden State	W 105–89	Brandon Roy (37)	Martell Webster (11)	Andre Miller (6)	Rose Garden; 20,507	22–13
36	January 4	@ Los Angeles Clippers	L 95–105	Martell Webster (25)	Jeff Pendergraph (7)	Andre Miller (16)	Staples Center; 15,104	22–14
37	January 5	Memphis	L 105–109	Brandon Roy (27)	Andre Miller (10)	Brandon Roy (9)	Rose Garden; 20,278	22–15
38	January 8	Lakers	W 107–98	Brandon Roy (32)	Juwan Howard (10)	Andre Miller (7)	Rose Garden; 20,629	23–15
39	January 10	Cleveland	L 94–106	Brandon Roy (34)	LaMarcus Aldridge (13)	Andre Miller (8)	Rose Garden; 20,614	23–16
40	January 13	Milwaukee	W 120–108	Brandon Roy (22)	LaMarcus Aldridge, Juwan Howard (7)	LaMarcus Aldridge, Andre Miller (6)	Rose Garden; 20,465	24–16
41	January 15	Orlando	W 102–87	Martell Webster (24)	LaMarcus Aldridge (14)	Andre Miller (9)	Rose Garden; 20,650	25–16
42	January 18	@ Washington	L 92–97	LaMarcus Aldridge, Andre Miller (22)	LaMarcus Aldridge (15)	Jerryd Bayless (8)	Verizon Center; 12,209	25–17
43	January 20	@ Philadelphia	W 98–90	Andre Miller (24)	LaMarcus Aldridge (9)	Steve Blake (5)	Wachovia Center; 12,607	26–17
44	January 22	@ Boston	L 95–98	Andre Miller (28)	Juwan Howard (12)	Andre Miller (8)	TD Garden; 18,624	26–18
45	January 23	@ Detroit	W 97–93	Martell Webster (28)	LaMarcus Aldridge (8)	Andre Miller (13)	Palace of Auburn Hills; 19,114	27–18
46	January 25	New Orleans	L 97–98	LaMarcus Aldridge, Juwan Howard (16)	Juwan Howard, Rudy Fernandez (7)	Andre Miller (10)	Rose Garden; 20,249	27–19
47	January 27	Utah	L 95–106	LaMarcus Aldridge (25)	Juwan Howard (11)	Andre Miller, Jerryd Bayless (4)	Rose Garden; 20,384	27–20
48	January 29	@ Houston	L 100–104	Rudy Fernandez (25)	Nicolas Batum (9)	Steve Blake (9)	Toyota Center; 16,129	27–21
49	January 30	@ Dallas	W 114–112	Andre Miller (52)	Juwan Howard (12)	Steve Blake (3)	American Airlines Arena; 20,078	28–21

February: 7–6 (home: 3–4; road: 4–2)

Game	Date	Team	Score	High points	High rebounds	High assists	Location Attendance	Record
50	February 1	Charlotte	W 98–79	LaMarcus Aldridge (17)	Nicolas Batum (9)	Andre Miller (10)	Rose Garden; 20,106	29–21
51	February 3	@ Utah	L 105–118	LaMarcus Aldridge (27)	LaMarcus Aldridge (12)	LaMarcus Aldridge (5)	EnergySolutions Arena; 19,911	29–22
52	February 4	San Antonio	W 96–93	LaMarcus Aldridge (28)	LaMarcus Aldridge (13)	Andre Miller (10)	Rose Garden; 20,572	30–22
53	February 6	LA Lakers	L 82–99	LaMarcus Aldridge (16)	Juwan Howard (7)	Steve Blake (7)	Rose Garden; 20,688	30–23
54	February 9	Oklahoma City	L 77–89	Andre Miller (22)	LaMarcus Aldridge (15)	Andre Miller (6)	Rose Garden; 20,460	30–24
55	February 10	@ Phoenix	W 108–101	LaMarcus Aldridge (22)	Andre Miller (7)	Steve Blake (12)	US Airways Center; 18,190	31–24
56	February 16	LA Clippers	W 109–87	Martell Webster (28)	LaMarcus Aldridge (9)	Andre Miller (12)	Rose Garden; 20,265	32–24
57	February 19	Boston	L 76–96	Andre Miller (16)	LaMarcus Aldridge (9)	Martell Webster, Andre Miller (2)	Rose Garden; 20,618	32–25
58	February 21	Utah	L 89–93 (OT)	Brandon Roy (23)	Marcus Camby (18)	Andre Miller (5)	Rose Garden; 20,565	32–26
59	February 23	@ New Jersey	W 102–93	Brandon Roy (28)	LaMarcus Aldridge (7)	Andre Miller (7)	IZOD Center; 11,138	33–26
60	February 24	@ Toronto	W 101–87	Brandon Roy (20)	Andre Miller, Rudy Fernandez (7)	Andre Miller (10)	Air Canada Centre; 16,161	34–26
61	February 26	@ Chicago	L 111–115 (OT)	LaMarcus Aldridge (32)	Marcus Camby (11)	Andre Miller (7)	United Center; 21,508	34–27
62	February 27	@ Minnesota	W 110–91	Nicolas Batum (31)	Nicolas Batum, LaMarcus Aldridge, Martell Webster (7)	Brandon Roy (9)	Target Center; 19,266	35–27

March: 11–2 (home: 6–0; road: 5–2)

Game	Date	Team	Score	High points	High rebounds	High assists	Location Attendance	Record
63	March 1	@ Memphis	W 103–93	Brandon Roy (25)	Brandon Roy, Marcus Camby (22)	Andre Miller (11)	FedEx Forum; 11,123	36–27
64	March 3	Indiana	W 102–79	Brandon Roy (22)	Dante Cunningham (8)	Rudy Fernandez (5)	Rose Garden; 20,623	37–27
65	March 7	@ Denver	L 106–118	Jerryd Bayless (24)	Juwan Howard, LaMarcus Aldridge (7)	Brandon Roy, Jerryd Bayless (5)	Pepsi Center; 17,266	37–28
66	March 9	Sacramento	W 88–81	Brandon Roy (19)	Brandon Roy, Marcus Camby, Juwan Howard (8)	Andre Miller (5)	Rose Garden; 20,587	38–28
67	March 11	@ Golden State	W 110–105	Brandon Roy (41)	Marcus Camby (17)	Andre Miller (7)	Oracle Arena; 17,308	39–28
68	March 12	@ Sacramento	W 110–94	Brandon Roy (28)	Marcus Camby (7)	Brandon Roy (4)	ARCO Arena; 12,110	40–28
69	March 14	Toronto	W 109–98	Nicolas Batum, LaMarcus Aldridge (22)	LaMarcus Aldridge (12)	Brandon Roy, Andre Miller (5)	Rose Garden; 20,639	41–28
70	March 19	Washington	W 76–74	LaMarcus Aldridge (19)	Marcus Camby (19)	Rudy Fernandez, Andre Miller (3)	Rose Garden; 20,592	42–28
71	March 21	@ Phoenix	L 87–93	Brandon Roy (23)	Marcus Camby (16)	Andre Miller (9)	US Airways Center; 18,422	42–29
72	March 25	Dallas	W 101–89	LaMarcus Aldridge (20)	Marcus Camby (11)	Andre Miller (10)	Rose Garden; 20,611	43–29
73	March 27	@ New Orleans	W 112–101	Brandon Roy (28)	Marcus Camby (14)	Andre Miller (8)	New Orleans Arena; 16,475	44–29
74	March 28	@ Oklahoma City	W 92–87	Andre Miller (26)	Marcus Camby (12)	Brandon Roy (7)	Ford Center; 18,203	45–29
75	March 31	NY Knicks	W 118–90	LaMarcus Aldridge (21)	Marcus Camby (10)	Jerryd Bayless, Andre Miller (7)	Rose Garden; 20,636	46–29

April: 4–3 (home: 1–1; road: 3–2)

Game	Date	Team	Score	High points	High rebounds	High assists	Location Attendance	Record
76	April 1	@ Denver	L 92–109	Andre Miller (24)	Marcus Camby (8)	LaMarcus Aldridge, Brandon Roy, Juwan Howard, Jerryd Bayless (3)	Pepsi Center; 19,155	46–30
77	April 3	@ Sacramento	W 98–87	Brandon Roy (24)	Marcus Camby (15)	Brandon Roy (6)	ARCO Arena; 12,875	47–30
78	April 7	@ LA Clippers	W 93–85	LaMarcus Aldridge (27)	LaMarcus Aldridge (12)	Brandon Roy (6)	Staples Center; 16,790	48–30
79	April 9	Dallas	L 77–83	LaMarcus Aldridge (27)	Marcus Camby (18)	Brandon Roy (6)	Rose Garden; 20,693	48–31
80	April 11	@ LA Lakers	W 91–88	LaMarcus Aldridge (24)	Marcus Camby (17)	Andre Miller (7)	Staples Center; 18,997	49–31
81	April 12	Oklahoma City	W 103–95	Marcus Camby (30)	Marcus Camby (13)	Andre Miller (7)	Rose Garden; 20,691	50–31
82	April 14	Golden State	L 116–122	Jeff Pendergraph (23)	Nicolas Batum (12)	Rudy Fernandez, Jerryd Bayless (9)	Rose Garden; 20,482	50–32

2009–10 season schedule

== Playoffs ==
2010 playoff game log
First Round: 2–4 (home: 1–2; road: 1–2)

Game	Date	Team	Score	High points	High rebounds	High assists	Location Attendance	Series
1	April 18	@ Phoenix	W 105–100	Andre Miller (31)	Marcus Camby (17)	Andre Miller (8)	US Airways Center; 18,422	1–0
2	April 20	@ Phoenix	L 90–119	Martell Webster (16)	Marcus Camby (10)	Andre Miller (3)	US Airways Center; 18,422	1–1
3	April 22	Phoenix	L 89–108	LaMarcus Aldridge (17)	Marcus Camby (10)	Andre Miller (9)	Rose Garden; 20,271	1–2
4	April 24	Phoenix	W 96–87	LaMarcus Aldridge (31)	LaMarcus Aldridge (11)	Andre Miller (8)	Rose Garden; 20,151	2–2
5	April 26	@ Phoenix	L 88–107	Andre Miller (21)	Marcus Camby (11)	Marcus Camby (5)	US Airways Center; 18,422	2–3
6	April 29	Phoenix	L 90–99	Martell Webster (19)	LaMarcus Aldridge (9)	Jerryd Bayless (7)	Rose Garden; 20,313	2–4

2010 playoff schedule

== Team statistics ==
=== Season ===
	1	2	3	4	Total
Opponents	47	36	35	66	184
Blazers	40	57	45	48	190

Average Points Scored: 98.4

Average Points Allowed: 95.2

Average Point Spread: + 3.2

Quarter-by-Quarter Scoring: 24.6

1st in the NBA in attendance at 716,666 (20,476 per game)

== Player statistics ==
Legend
GP	Games played	GS	Games started	MPG	Minutes per game
FG%	Field-goal percentage	3P%	3-point field-goal percentage	FT%	Free-throw percentage
RPG	Rebounds per game	APG	Assists per game	SPG	Steals per game
BPG	Blocks per game	PPG	Points per game

=== Season ===
Portland Trail Blazers statistics
Player	GP	GS	MPG	FG%	3P%	FT%	RPG	APG	SPG	BPG	PPG
LaMarcus Aldridge	78	78	37.5	.495	.313	.757	8.0	2.1	.9	.6	17.9
Nicolas Batum	37	25	24.8	.519	.409	.843	3.8	1.2	.6	.7	10.1
Jerryd Bayless	74	11	17.6	.414	.315	.831	1.6	2.3	.4	.1	8.5
Marcus Camby	23	23	31.2	.497	.000	.581	11.1	1.5	1.1	2.0	7.0
Dante Cunningham	63	2	11.2	.495	.000	.646	2.5	.2	.4	.3	3.9
Travis Diener	5	0	5.2	.250	.200	.500	.2	.8	.2	.0	.6
Rudy Fernández	62	2	23.2	.378	.368	.867	2.6	2.0	1.0	.2	8.1
Juwan Howard	73	27	22.4	.509	.000	.786	4.6	.8	.4	.1	6.0
Andre Miller	82	66	30.5	.445	.200	.821	3.2	5.4	1.1	.1	14.0
Patrick Mills	10	0	3.8	.417	.500	.571	.2	.5	.0	.0	2.6
Greg Oden	21	21	23.9	.605	.000	.766	8.5	.9	.4	2.3	11.1
Jeff Pendergraph	39	4	10.4	.662	.000	.900	2.5	.0	.2	.4	2.7
Joel Przybilla	30	9	22.7	.523	.000	.647	7.9	.3	.3	1.4	4.1
Brandon Roy	65	65	37.2	.473	.330	.780	4.4	4.7	.9	.2	21.5
Martell Webster	82	49	24.5	.405	.373	.813	3.3	.8	.6	.5	9.4

=== Playoffs ===
Portland Trail Blazers statistics
Player	GP	GS	MPG	FG%	3P%	FT%	RPG	APG	SPG	BPG	PPG
LaMarcus Aldridge	6	6	38.2	.430	.500	.750	6.0	2.2	1.2	1.8	19.0
Nicolas Batum	6	6	23.2	.459	.429	.750	3.2	.8	.3	.0	8.2
Jerryd Bayless	6	2	27.7	.431	.400	.792	2.7	3.8	.3	.0	13.5
Marcus Camby	6	6	29.7	.421	.000	.500	10.0	2.3	.7	1.2	5.8
Dante Cunningham	5	0	8.4	.600	.00	.833	2.6	.0	1.0	.0	4.6
Travis Diener	2	0	3.5	.000	.000	.000	.0	1.0	.0	.0	.0
Rudy Fernández	6	3	19.8	.444	.478	.750	1.7	1.3	.2	.0	6.8
Juwan Howard	6	0	14.5	.526	.000	.000	2.7	.7	.2	.2	3.3
Andre Miller	6	6	35.0	.405	.429	.775	3.2	5.8	1.2	.2	15.7
Patrick Mills	3	0	4.0	.500	1.000	1.000	.0	1.0	.0	.0	2.0
Greg Oden	0	0	.0	.000	.000	.000	.0	.0	.0	.0	.0
Jeff Pendergraph	3	0	5.7	.500	.00	.750	.7	.0	.7	1.0	2.3
Joel Przybilla	0	0	.0	.000	.000	.000	.0	.0	.0	.0	.0
Brandon Roy	3	1	27.7	.303	.167	.778	2.3	1.7	.0	.0	9.7
Martell Webster	6	0	25.3	.423	.294	.556	4.3	.7	.8	.5	9.8

== Awards, records and milestones ==
=== Awards ===
==== Week/Month ====
- Brandon Roy was named Western Conference Player of the Week for games played March 8–March 14.

==== All-Star ====
- Brandon Roy was selected as an All-Star reserve (third All-Star appearance; did not play due to injury).

== Injuries and surgeries ==
- July 9: Patrick Mills – broken foot; returned to active roster January 4
- September 9: Jeff Pendergraph – surgery to repair congenital hip disorder; returned to active roster December 21
- October 30: Nicolas Batum – surgery to repair right shoulder muscle tear; returned to active roster January 25
- November 14: Travis Outlaw – broken left foot; traded February 16
- December 5: Greg Oden – broken left patella; out for season
- December 5: Coach Nate McMillan – ruptured right Achilles tendon; returned to the bench December 15
- December 8: Rudy Fernández – surgery to repair sciatic nerve damage; returned to active roster January 13
- December 22: Joel Przybilla – dislocated right patella and ruptured patellar tendon; out for season
- January 2: Brandon Roy – strained hamstring; returned to active roster February 16
- April 11: Brandon Roy – right knee meniscus tear, arthroscopic knee surgery; returned to active roster April 24

== Transactions ==
Portland Trail Blazers
Players Added

Draft

- Víctor Claver
- Dante Cunningham
- Jon Brockman
- Patrick Mills

Trades

- Jeff Pendergraph (From Kings)
- Marcus Camby (From Clippers)

Free agency

- Juwan Howard (From Bobcats)
- Andre Miller (From 76ers)
- Travis Diener (From Pacers)
Players lost

Via trade

- Jon Brockman (To Kings)
- Sergio Rodríguez (To Kings)
- Steve Blake (To Clippers)
- Travis Outlaw (To Clippers)

Via Free Agency

- Channing Frye (To Suns)
- Raef LaFrentz
- Shavlik Randolph
- Michael Ruffin
