= Dante Cunningham =

American basketball player (born 1987)

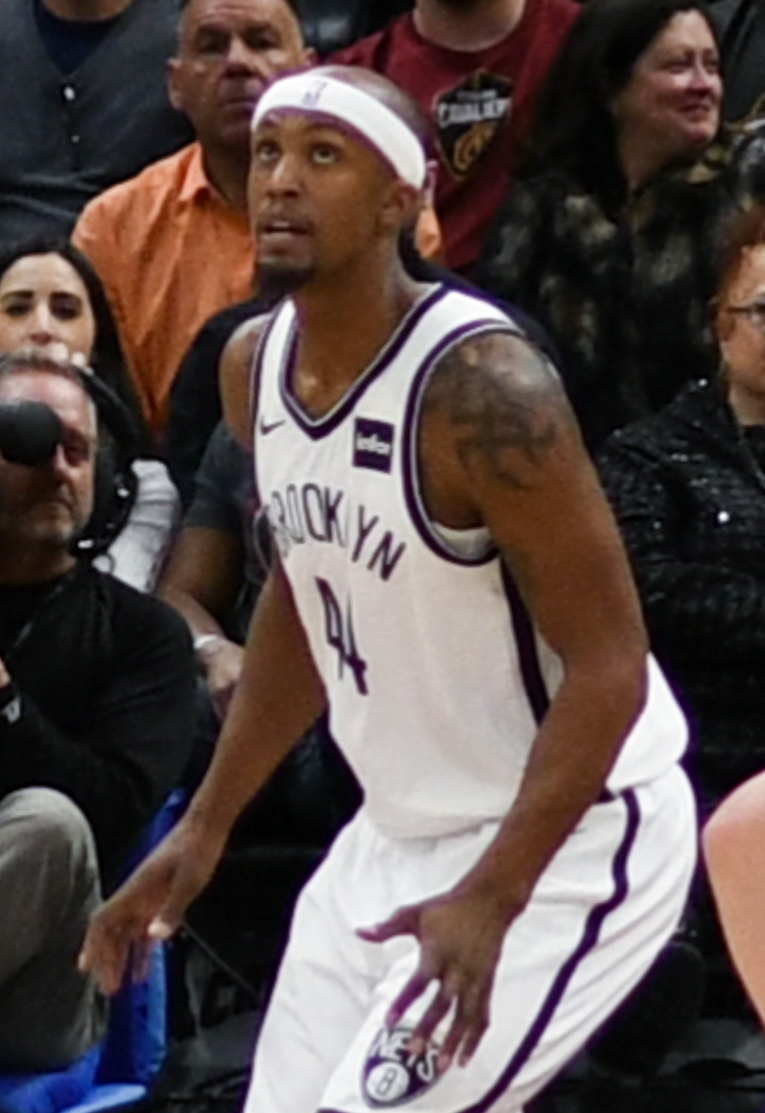
- Cunningham with the Brooklyn Nets in 2018

Personal information
- Born: April 22, 1987 (age 39) Clinton, Maryland, U.S.
- Listed height: 6 ft 8 in (2.03 m)
- Listed weight: 230 lb (104 kg)

Career information
- High school: St. John's (Washington D.C.); Potomac (Oxon Hill, Maryland)
- College: Villanova (2005–2009)
- NBA draft: 2009: 2nd round, 33rd overall pick
- Drafted by: Portland Trail Blazers
- Playing career: 2009–2024
- Position: Power forward / small forward
- Number: 33, 44

Career history
- 2009–2011: Portland Trail Blazers
- 2011: Charlotte Bobcats
- 2011–2012: Memphis Grizzlies
- 2012–2014: Minnesota Timberwolves
- 2014–2018: New Orleans Pelicans
- 2018: Brooklyn Nets
- 2018–2019: San Antonio Spurs
- 2019–2020: Fujian Sturgeons
- 2021: Cangrejeros de Santurce
- 2021–2022: Le Mans Sarthe Basket
- 2022–2024: Changwon LG Sakers
- Stats at NBA.com
- Stats at Basketball Reference

Dante Lamar Cunningham (born April 22, 1987) is an American former professional basketball player. He played college basketball for the Villanova Wildcats before being selected with the 33rd overall pick in the 2009 NBA draft by the Portland Trail Blazers.

== Early life ==
Cunningham was born in Clinton, Maryland, to Searcy Blankenship and Ron Cunningham. His older sister Davalyn played in the WNBA.

== High school career ==
Cunningham began his prep career at St. John's College High School in Washington, D.C. While a junior, he averaged 10 points per game and 7.4 rebounds. One of his teammates, Dwayne Anderson, would later play at Villanova with Cunningham.

As a senior, Cunningham transferred to Potomac High School, which he led to a 27–0 season under Head Coach Rico Reed. He averaged 13 rebounds, 20 points, and four blocked shots per game at Potomac. He was honored as The Washington Post Metropolitan Player of the Year.

== College career ==
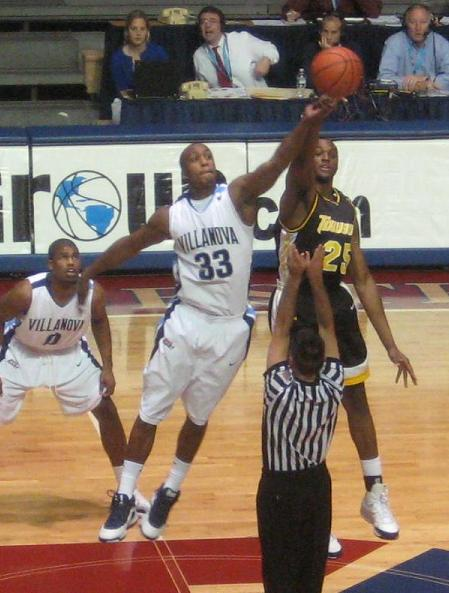
Dante Cunningham at the Palestra in Philadelphia in November 2008

At Villanova Cunningham played in all 33 games and was a starter in four during his freshman year.

In his senior year, Cunningham would go on to lead the team in scoring with 16.1 points and take home the Big East Most Improved Player award. He led the Wildcats to their first Final Four appearance since 1985. Cunningham was named to the 2008–2009 All Big East second team and the 2009 NCAA Tournament All Region .

== Professional career ==
=== Portland Trail Blazers (2009–2011) ===
Cunningham was drafted 33rd overall by the Portland Trail Blazers in the 2009 NBA draft. He played for Portland's Las Vegas Summer League team where he averaged over 18 points and 5 rebounds per game in four contests. On August 21, 2009, Cunningham signed his rookie scale contract with the Trail Blazers.

=== Charlotte Bobcats (2011) ===
On February 24, 2011, Cunningham was traded, along with Joel Przybilla, Sean Marks and two future first-round draft picks, to the Charlotte Bobcats in exchange for Gerald Wallace.

=== Memphis Grizzlies (2011–2012) ===
On December 20, 2011, Cunningham received a three-year, $7 million offer sheet from the Memphis Grizzlies. The Bobcats declined to match the offer and subsequently signed the contract with the Grizzlies.

=== Minnesota Timberwolves (2012–2014) ===
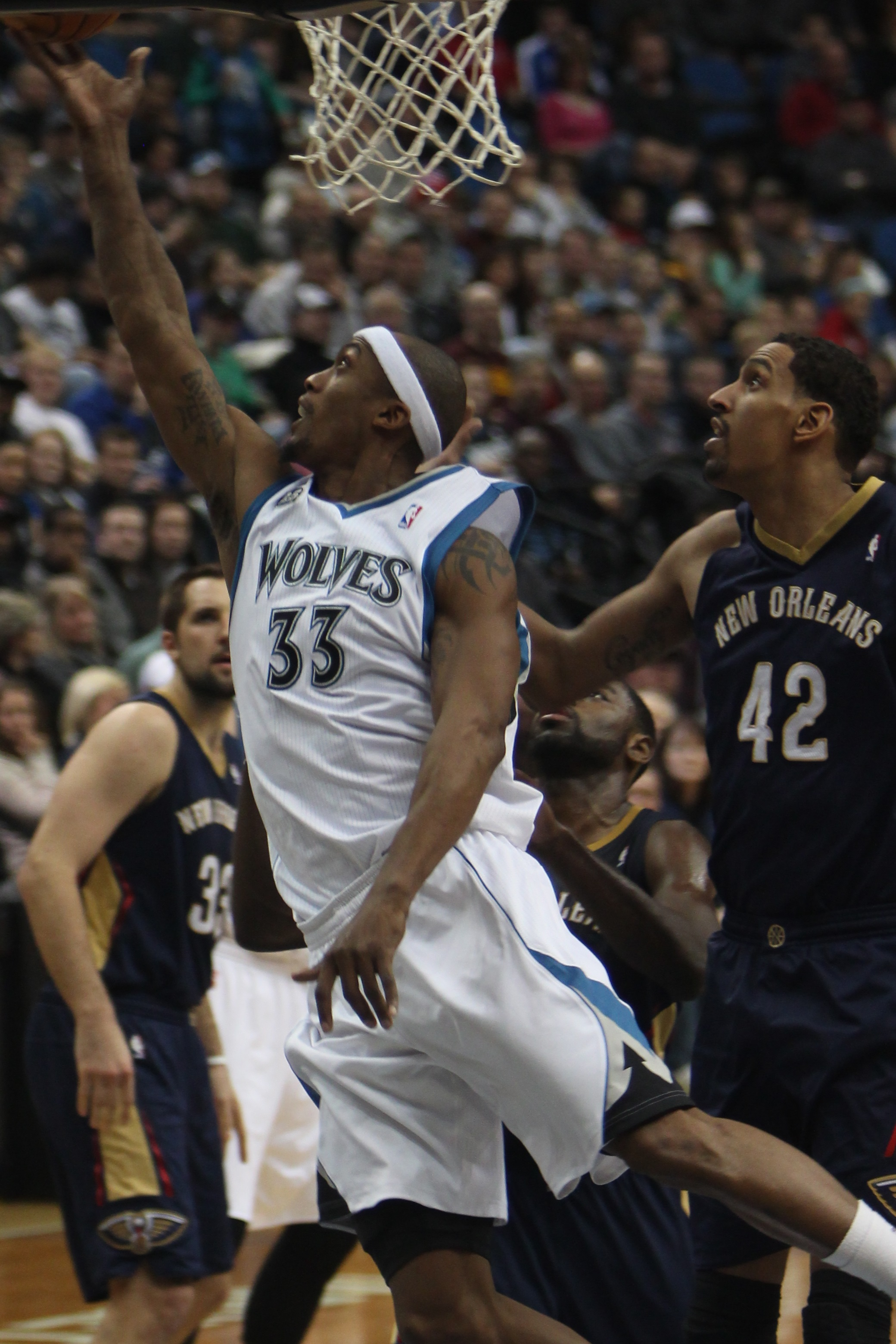
Cunningham with the Timberwolves in January 2014

On July 24, 2012, Cunningham was traded to the Minnesota Timberwolves in exchange for Wayne Ellington.

=== New Orleans Pelicans (2014–2018) ===
On December 4, 2014, Cunningham signed with the New Orleans Pelicans. On July 9, 2015, he re-signed with the Pelicans. On September 25, 2017, he re-signed with the Pelicans.

=== Brooklyn Nets (2018) ===
On February 8, 2018, Cunningham was traded to the Brooklyn Nets in exchange for Rashad Vaughn.

=== San Antonio Spurs (2018–2019) ===
On July 20, 2018, Cunningham signed with the San Antonio Spurs.

=== Fujian Sturgeons (2019–2020) ===
On December 11, 2019, Cunningham was listed in the squad of Fujian Sturgeons and made his debut for Fujian Sturgeons on the next day, scoring fourteen points and collecting eight rebounds in a 111–107 win over the Beijing Ducks. He averaged 15 points and 7 rebounds per game.

=== Cangrejeros de Santurce (2021) ===
On July 7, 2021, Cunningham signed with the Cangrejeros de Santurce of the Baloncesto Superior Nacional. In 10 games, he averaged 11.5 points, 6.1 rebounds, 1.6 steals and 1.1 assists per game.

=== Le Mans Sarthe Basket (2021–2022) ===
On August 27, 2021, Cunningham signed with Le Mans Sarthe Basket of the LNB Pro A.

== NBA career statistics ==
Legend
GP	Games played	GS	Games started	MPG	Minutes per game
FG%	Field goal percentage	3P%	3-point field goal percentage	FT%	Free throw percentage
RPG	Rebounds per game	APG	Assists per game	SPG	Steals per game
BPG	Blocks per game	PPG	Points per game	**Bold**	Career high

=== Regular season ===
Year	Team	GP	GS	MPG	FG%	3P%	FT%	RPG	APG	SPG	BPG	PPG
2009–10	Portland	63	2	11.2	.495	–	.646	2.5	.2	.4	.4	3.9
2010–11	Portland	56	9	19.8	.433	.000	.711	3.4	.5	.7	.6	5.1
2010–11	Charlotte	22	9	24.0	.508	.111	.765	4.0	.6	.7	.5	**9.0**
2011–12	Memphis	64	5	17.6	**.516**	–	.652	3.8	.6	.7	.5	5.2
2012–13	Minnesota	80	9	**25.1**	.468	.000	.650	**5.1**	.8	**1.1**	.5	8.7
2013–14	Minnesota	**81**	7	20.2	.464	.000	.567	4.1	**1.0**	.8	**.7**	6.3
2014–15	New Orleans	66	27	25.0	.457	.100	.617	3.9	.8	.7	.6	5.2
2015–16	New Orleans	80	**46**	24.6	.451	.316	.695	3.0	**1.0**	.5	.4	6.1
2016–17	New Orleans	66	35	25.0	.485	.392	.593	4.2	.6	.6	.4	6.6
2017–18	New Orleans	51	24	21.9	.440	.324	.556	3.8	.5	.5	.3	5.0
2017–18	Brooklyn	22	1	20.3	.468	.383	.688	4.8	**1.0**	.5	.6	7.5
2018–19	San Antonio	64	21	14.5	.475	**.462**	**.778**	2.9	.8	.4	.2	3.0
Career		715	195	20.8	.469	.345	.649	3.7	.7	.6	.5	5.8

=== Playoffs ===
Year	Team	GP	GS	MPG	FG%	3P%	FT%	RPG	APG	SPG	BPG	PPG
2010	Portland	5	0	8.4	.600	.000	.833	2.6	.0	**1.0**	.0	4.6
2012	Memphis	**7**	0	7.0	.364	–	–	1.6	.0	.1	.3	1.1
2015	New Orleans	4	0	**18.8**	**.818**	–	**1.000**	**4.5**	**.5**	.8	**1.0**	**5.3**
2019	San Antonio	5	0	2.6	.667	**1.000**	–	1.2	.0	.0	.0	1.2
Career		21	0	8.5	.600	.667	.889	2.3	.1	.4	.3	2.8

== Personal life ==
On April 3, 2014, Cunningham was arrested for allegedly choking his girlfriend with whom he lived. Three days later, he was arrested on alleged domestic abuse charges. By August 18, 2014, charges were dropped, due to evidence Cunningham's then girlfriend had fabricated her accusations.

Cunningham was included on a preliminary list for Great Britain's Eurobasket 2009 qualifying matches in 2008. However, he was later ruled ineligible to compete for Britain after an investigation by British Basketball officials into his ancestral ties failed to prove his case to receive UK citizenship.
