= 2009–10 Orlando Magic season =

NBA professional basketball team season

- Division champions
- Head coach: Stan Van Gundy
- President: Bob Vander Weide
- General manager: Otis Smith
- Owner: Richard DeVos
- Arena: Amway Arena

Results
- Record: 59–23 (.720)
- Place: Division: 1st (Southeast); Conference: 2nd (Eastern)
- Playoff finish: Eastern Conference Finals (lost to Celtics 2–4)
- Stats at Basketball Reference

Local media
- Television: Fox Sports Florida, Sun Sports
- Radio: WDBO

The 2009–10 Orlando Magic season was the Magic's 21st season in the National Basketball Association (NBA).

The Magic were coming off of an NBA Finals defeat to the Los Angeles Lakers in five games.

The season was significant as it signaled the conclusion of the Magic's tenure at the Amway Arena as their designated home venue.

The team traded for Vince Carter before the 2009-10 season. The inclusion of Carter aimed to provide the Magic with a seasoned NBA perimeter superstar to complement Dwight Howard's abilities. This was in response to the 2009 NBA Finals defeat at the hands of the Kobe Bryant-led Los Angeles Lakers.

The Magic would replicate their previous regular season performance and boasted the NBA's fourth highest offensive rating among all teams.

During the playoffs, the Magic swept the Charlotte Bobcats in four games in the First Round and swept the Atlanta Hawks in four games in the semi-finals. In the conference finals the Magic were favoured but ultimately lost to the Boston Celtics in six games. The Celtics would go on to lose to the Lakers in the Finals.

As of 2026, this was the last season the Magic won a playoff series.

== Key dates ==
- June 25 – The 2009 NBA draft took place in New York City.
- July 8 – The free agency period started.
- October 28 – The Magic began the season with a game against the Philadelphia 76ers.
- November 16 – Rashard Lewis made his season debut after serving a 10-game suspension for testing positive for DHEA, a banned substance.
- November 17 – It was announced that Jameer Nelson needed surgery after injuring his knee in the previous night's game.
- December 21 – Nelson returned from his injury.
- January 21 – Dwight Howard was named the starting center for the Eastern Conference in the 2010 NBA All-Star Game.
- January 31 – Stan Van Gundy was named the coach of the East's all-stars in the 2010 NBA All-Star Game.
- March 3 – The Magic clinched their third consecutive winning season with a win over the Golden State Warriors.
- March 16 – By virtue of the Charlotte Bobcats losing that night, the Magic clinched a playoff berth.
- April 6 – By virtue of the Atlanta Hawks losing that night, the Magic clinched their third consecutive Southeast Division title.
- April 14 – The regular season ended. The Magic finished with the same win–loss record as the previous season.
- April 20 – Dwight Howard was awarded the NBA Defensive Player of the Year Award for the second consecutive season.
- April 26 – The Magic won their first round series in the playoffs by sweeping the Charlotte Bobcats. It was the first sweep of a 7-game series for the Magic in franchise history.
- May 10 – The Magic completed a sweep of the Atlanta Hawks in the conference semi-finals.
- May 28 – After losing the first three games of the series, the Magic won the next two before losing Game 6 on the road against the Boston Celtics.

== Summary ==
=== NBA Draft 2009 ===
As a result of previous trades made by the Orlando Magic, they did not have any draft choices. However, the NBA still had Adidas make a Draft Cap, which would have been given to a potential draft choice. The hat was available for public purchase on the NBA's official webstore.

==== Transactions ====
The Magic have been involved in the following transactions during the 2009–10 season.

Orlando Magic
Players Added

Via Trade

- Vince Carter (From Nets)
- Ryan Anderson (From Nets)

Via Free Agency

- Matt Barnes (To Suns)
- Brandon Bass (To Mavericks)
- Marcin Gortat (From Re-signed)
Players Lost

Via Sign & Trade

- Hedo Türkoğlu (To Raptors)

Trade

- Tony Battie (To Nets)
- Rafer Alston (To Nets)
- Courtney Lee (To Nets)

==== Trades ====
Date	Details
June 25, 2009	To New Jersey Nets Rafer Alston; Tony Battie; Courtney Lee	To Orlando Magic Vince Carter; Ryan Anderson
July 9, 2009	To Toronto Raptors Hedo Türkoğlu; Devean George; Antoine Wright	To Dallas Mavericks Shawn Marion; Kris Humphries; Nathan Jawai; Greg Buckner; Cash Considerations	To Memphis Grizzlies Future Second Round NBA draft Choice; Cash Considerations	To Orlando Magic Cash Considerations

==== Free agents acquired ====
Player	Former team	Contract terms
Brandon Bass	Dallas Mavericks	Four Years, $16,000,000
Matt Barnes	Phoenix Suns	Two Years
Jason Williams	Miami Heat	One Year, $1,300,000
Morris Almond	Utah Jazz	Waived
Linton Johnson III	Chicago Bulls	Waived pre-season

==== Players re-signed ====
Player	Contract terms
Marcin Gortat	Five Years, $34,000,000
Adonal Foyle	One Year

==== Miscellaneous ====
Player	Date	Transaction
Rashard Lewis	August 6, 2009	Suspended by NBA for 10 games.

== Roster ==
2009–10 Orlando Magic roster
Players

Pos.	No.	Player	Height	Weight	DOB	From
F	33	Ryan Anderson	6 ft 10 in (2.08 m)	240 lb (109 kg)	1988–05–06	California
F	22	Matt Barnes	6 ft 7 in (2.01 m)	226 lb (103 kg)	1980–03–09	UCLA
F	30	Brandon Bass	6 ft 8 in (2.03 m)	250 lb (113 kg)	1985–04–30	LSU
G/F	15	Vince Carter	6 ft 6 in (1.98 m)	220 lb (100 kg)	1977–01–26	North Carolina
C	31	Adonal Foyle	6 ft 10 in (2.08 m)	270 lb (122 kg)	1975–03–09	Colgate
F/C	13	Marcin Gortat	6 ft 11 in (2.11 m)	240 lb (109 kg)	1984–02–17	Poland
C	12	Dwight Howard	6 ft 11 in (2.11 m)	265 lb (120 kg)	1985–12–08	SW Atlanta Christian Academy HS (GA)
G	8	Anthony Johnson	6 ft 3 in (1.91 m)	195 lb (88 kg)	1974–10–02	College of Charleston
F	9	Rashard Lewis	6 ft 10 in (2.08 m)	230 lb (104 kg)	1979–08–08	Alief Elsik HS (TX)
G	14	Jameer Nelson	6 ft 0 in (1.83 m)	190 lb (86 kg)	1982–02–09	Saint Joseph's
G/F	20	Mickaël Piétrus	6 ft 6 in (1.98 m)	215 lb (98 kg)	1982–02–07	Guadeloupe
G	7	JJ Redick	6 ft 4 in (1.93 m)	190 lb (86 kg)	1984–06–24	Duke
G	44	Jason Williams	6 ft 1 in (1.85 m)	180 lb (82 kg)	1975–11–18	Florida

Coaches
Head coach
- Stan Van Gundy
Assistant(s)
- Ahmad Ajami
- Bob Beyer
- Steve Clifford
- Patrick Ewing
- Brendan Malone

Legend
- (DP) Unsigned draft pick
- (FA) Free agent
- (S) Suspended
- Injured

Roster
Updated: August 9, 2009

== Preseason ==
2009 Pre-season game log: 8–0 (home: 4–0; road: 3–0; Neutral: 1–0)
#	Date	Visitor	Score	Home	OT	High Scorer	Attendance	Record	Recap
1	October 5	Orlando Magic	110–105	Dallas Mavericks		Vince Carter (21)	16,596	1–0
2	October 7	Miami Heat	86–90	Orlando Magic		Ryan Anderson (16)	16,101	2–0
3	October 9	Houston Rockets	104–113	Orlando Magic		Rashard Lewis (22)	16,344	3–0
4	October 12	Orlando Magic	102–83	Memphis Grizzlies		Mickaël Piétrus (19)	7,681	4–0
5	October 13 (in Wichita, Kansas)	Orlando Magic	121–86	New Orleans Hornets		Ryan Anderson (22)		5–0
6	October 19	Orlando Magic	101–98	Chicago Bulls		Ryan Anderson, Dwight Howard (18)	20,688	6–0
7	October 21	Indiana Pacers	87–117	Orlando Magic		Vince Carter (21)	16,218	7–0
8	October 23	Atlanta Hawks	86-123	Orlando Magic		Vince Carter (26)	17,343	8–0

== Regular season ==
=== Standings ===
Southeast Division	W	L	PCT	GB	Home	Road	Div
y-Orlando Magic	59	23	.720	–	34–7	25–16	10–6
x-Atlanta Hawks	53	29	.646	6	34–7	19–22	8–8
x-Miami Heat	47	35	.573	12	24–17	23–18	9–7
x-Charlotte Bobcats	44	38	.537	15	31–10	13–28	10–6
Washington Wizards	26	56	.317	33	15–26	11–30	3–13

#	Eastern Conference				
#	Team	W	L	PCT	GB
1	z-Cleveland Cavaliers	61	21	.744	–
2	y-Orlando Magic	59	23	.720	2
3	x-Atlanta Hawks	53	29	.646	8
4	y-Boston Celtics	50	32	.610	11
5	x-Miami Heat	47	35	.573	14
6	x-Milwaukee Bucks	46	36	.561	15
7	x-Charlotte Bobcats	44	38	.537	17
8	x-Chicago Bulls	41	41	.500	20
9	Toronto Raptors	40	42	.488	21
10	Indiana Pacers	32	50	.390	29
11	New York Knicks	29	53	.354	32
12	Philadelphia 76ers	27	55	.329	34
13	Detroit Pistons	27	55	.329	34
14	Washington Wizards	26	56	.317	35
15	New Jersey Nets	12	70	.146	49

z – clinched home court advantage through NBA Finals
y – clinched division title
x – clinched playoff spot

=== Game log ===
2009–10 game log
Total: 59–23 (home: 34–7; road: 25–16)
October: 2–0 (home: 1–0; road: 1–0)

Game	Date	Team	Score	High points	High rebounds	High assists	Location Attendance	Record
1	October 28	Philadelphia	W 120–106	Dwight Howard (21)	Dwight Howard (15)	Jameer Nelson (6)	Amway Arena; 17,461	1–0
2	October 30	@ New Jersey	W 95–85	Dwight Howard (20)	Dwight Howard (22)	Jason Williams (8)	Izod Center; 17,525	2–0

November: 12–4 (home: 5–2; road: 7–2)

Game	Date	Team	Score	High points	High rebounds	High assists	Location Attendance	Record
3	November 1	@ Toronto	W 125–116	Jameer Nelson (30)	Dwight Howard (11)	Jameer Nelson, JJ Redick (5)	Air Canada Centre; 18,147	3–0
4	November 3	@ Detroit	L 80–85	Vince Carter (15)	Matt Barnes, Marcin Gortat (7)	Jameer Nelson (6)	The Palace of Auburn Hills; 15,487	3–1
5	November 4	Phoenix	W 122–100	Dwight Howard (25)	Matt Barnes (11)	Jameer Nelson (10)	Amway Arena; 17,461	4–1
6	November 6	Detroit	W 110–103	Dwight Howard (22)	Dwight Howard (12)	Jameer Nelson (8)	Amway Arena; 17,461	5–1
7	November 8	@ Oklahoma City	L 74–102	Dwight Howard (20)	Dwight Howard (7)	Jason Williams (5)	Ford Center; 18,203	5–2
8	November 10	@ Charlotte	W 93–81	Vince Carter, Dwight Howard (15)	Dwight Howard (10)	Dwight Howard (6)	Time Warner Cable Arena; 13,415	6–2
9	November 11	Cleveland	L 93–102	Vince Carter (29)	Marcin Gortat (8)	Jameer Nelson (5)	Amway Arena; 17,461	6–3
10	November 13	New Jersey	W 88–72	Dwight Howard (26)	Matt Barnes (13)	Matt Barnes (5)	Amway Arena; 17,461	7–3
11	November 16	Charlotte	W 97–91	Jameer Nelson (16)	Dwight Howard (11)	Jameer Nelson (5)	Amway Arena; 17,461	8–3
12	November 18	Oklahoma City	W 108–94	Vince Carter (18)	Dwight Howard, Rashard Lewis (10)	Rashard Lewis (9)	Amway Arena; 17,461	9–3
13	November 20	@ Boston	W 83–78	Vince Carter (26)	Dwight Howard (15)	Vince Carter, Jason Williams (6)	TD Garden; 18,624	10–3
14	November 22	@ Toronto	W 104–96	Vince Carter (24)	Dwight Howard (12)	JJ Redick (5)	Air Canada Centre; 17,233	11–3
15	November 25	Miami	L 98–99	Jason Williams (25)	Dwight Howard (16)	Jason Williams (8)	Amway Arena; 17,461	11–4
16	November 26	@ Atlanta	W 93–76	Dwight Howard (22)	Dwight Howard (17)	Matt Barnes, Dwight Howard, Anthony Johnson, Jason Williams (3)	Philips Arena; 19,193	12–4
17	November 28	@ Milwaukee	W 100–98	Dwight Howard, Vince Carter (25)	Dwight Howard (20)	Jason Williams (10)	Bradley Center; 16,128	13–4
18	November 29	@ New York	W 114–102	Rashard Lewis (26)	Dwight Howard (16)	Jason Williams (8)	Madison Square Garden; 18,861	14–4

December: 9–4 (home: 7–1; road: 2–3)

Game	Date	Team	Score	High points	High rebounds	High assists	Location Attendance	Record
19	December 2	New York	W 118–104	Rashard Lewis (20)	Rashard Lewis (11)	Vince Carter, Jason Williams (5)	Amway Arena; 17,461	15–4
20	December 5	@ Golden State	W 126–118	Vince Carter (27)	Dwight Howard (8)	Jason Williams (8)	Oracle Arena; 19,054	16–4
21	December 8	@ L.A. Clippers	W 97–86	Dwight Howard (25)	Dwight Howard (11)	Dwight Howard (5)	Staples Center; 16,750	17–4
22	December 10	@ Utah	L 111–120	Vince Carter (34)	Dwight Howard (10)	Jason Williams (5)	EnergySolutions Arena; 18,735	17–5
23	December 11	@ Phoenix	L 103–106	Rashard Lewis (24)	Dwight Howard (18)	Vince Carter, Jason Williams (6)	US Airways Center; 18,216	17–6
24	December 14	Indiana	W 106–98	Vince Carter (28)	Dwight Howard (23)	Anthony Johnson (7)	Amway Arena; 17,461	18–6
25	December 16	Toronto	W 118–99	Rashard Lewis (21)	Dwight Howard (14)	Vince Carter, Jason Williams (7)	Amway Arena; 17,461	19–6
26	December 17	@ Miami	L 86–104	Dwight Howard (17)	Dwight Howard (14)	Anthony Johnson (5)	American Airlines Arena; 18,303	19–7
27	December 19	Portland	W 92–83	Rashard Lewis (15)	Dwight Howard (20)	Vince Carter, Anthony Johnson (3)	Amway Arena; 17,461	20–7
28	December 21	Utah	W 104–99	Dwight Howard (21)	Vince Carter, Dwight Howard (9)	Jason Williams (4)	Amway Arena; 17,461	21–7
29	December 23	Houston	W 102–87	Vince Carter (18)	Dwight Howard (20)	Jason Williams (6)	Amway Arena; 17,461	22–7
30	December 25	Boston	L 77–86	Vince Carter (27)	Dwight Howard (20)	Jameer Nelson (3)	Amway Arena; 17,461	22–8
31	December 30	Milwaukee	W 117–92	Vince Carter (25)	Dwight Howard (10)	Jason Williams (7)	Amway Arena; 17,461	23–8

January: 9–8 (home: 5–1; road: 4–7)

Game	Date	Team	Score	High points	High rebounds	High assists	Location Attendance	Record
32	January 1	@ Minnesota	W 106–94	Rashard Lewis (21)	Dwight Howard (15)	Vince Carter, Jameer Nelson (6)	Target Center; 17,065	24–8
33	January 2	@ Chicago	L 93–101	Matt Barnes (23)	Dwight Howard (12)	Jameer Nelson (10)	United Center; 21,162	24–9
34	January 5	@ Indiana	L 90–97	Jameer Nelson, Mickaël Piétrus (16)	Dwight Howard (15)	Jameer Nelson (4)	Conseco Fieldhouse; 11,119	24–10
35	January 6	Toronto	L 103–108	Rashard Lewis (24)	Dwight Howard (12)	Jameer Nelson (8)	Amway Arena; 17,461	24–11
36	January 8	@ Washington	L 97–104	Dwight Howard (23)	Dwight Howard (11)	Jameer Nelson (5)	Verizon Center; 20,173	24–12
37	January 9	Atlanta	W 113–81	Matt Barnes (18)	Marcin Gortat (12)	Jason Williams (6)	Amway Arena; 17,461	25–12
38	January 12	@ Sacramento	W 109–88	Dwight Howard (30)	Dwight Howard (16)	Jason Williams (6)	ARCO Arena; 14,426	26–12
39	January 13	@ Denver	L 97–115	Matt Barnes (28)	Dwight Howard (13)	Jason Williams (4)	Pepsi Center; 18,475	26–13
40	January 15	@ Portland	L 87–102	Rashard Lewis, Jameer Nelson (15)	Dwight Howard (11)	Jason Williams (4)	Rose Garden; 20,650	26–14
41	January 18	@ L.A. Lakers	L 92–98	Dwight Howard (24)	Dwight Howard (12)	Jameer Nelson (8)	Staples Center; 18,997	26–15
42	January 20	Indiana	W 109–98	Dwight Howard (32)	Matt Barnes (16)	Jason Williams (9)	Amway Arena; 17,461	27–15
43	January 22	Sacramento	W 100–84	Dwight Howard (19)	Dwight Howard (15)	Jameer Nelson (7)	Amway Arena; 17,461	28–15
44	January 23	@ Charlotte	W 106–95 (OT)	Vince Carter, Jameer Nelson (21)	Dwight Howard (20)	Jameer Nelson (7)	Time Warner Cable Arena; 19,277	29–15
45	January 25	@ Memphis	L 94–99	Dwight Howard (27)	Dwight Howard (15)	Jason Williams (4)	FedExForum; 12,273	29–16
46	January 28	Boston	W 96–94	Rashard Lewis (23)	Dwight Howard (10)	Vince Carter, Jameer Nelson, Jason Williams (2)	Amway Arena; 17,461	30–16
47	January 30	Atlanta	W 104–86	Dwight Howard (31)	Dwight Howard (19)	JJ Redick (7)	Amway Arena; 17,461	31–16
48	January 31	@ Detroit	W 91–86	JJ Redick (17)	Dwight Howard (15)	Rashard Lewis, Jason Williams (4)	The Palace of Auburn Hills; 19,107	32–16

February: 8–4 (home: 5–2; road: 3–2)

Game	Date	Team	Score	High points	High rebounds	High assists	Location Attendance	Record
49	February 2	Milwaukee	W 99–82	Dwight Howard (22)	Dwight Howard (11)	Vince Carter (7)	Amway Arena; 17,461	33–16
50	February 5	Washington	L 91–92	Vince Carter (21)	Dwight Howard (18)	Jameer Nelson (5)	Amway Arena; 17,461	33–17
51	February 7	@ Boston	W 96–89	Vince Carter (20)	Dwight Howard (13)	Jameer Nelson (4)	TD Garden; 18,264	34–17
52	February 8	New Orleans	W 123–117	Vince Carter (48)	Dwight Howard (12)	Jameer Nelson (10)	Amway Arena; 17,461	35–17
53	February 10	@ Chicago	W 107–87	Dwight Howard (18)	Dwight Howard (14)	Jameer Nelson (6)	United Center; 21,566	36–17
54	February 11	@ Cleveland	L 106–115	Dwight Howard, Rashard Lewis (19)	Dwight Howard (11)	Jameer Nelson (5)	Quicken Loans Arena; 20,562	36–18
All-Star Break
55	February 17	Detroit	W 116–91	Dwight Howard (33)	Dwight Howard (17)	Jameer Nelson (9)	Amway Arena; 17,461	37–18
56	February 19	Dallas	L 85–95	Dwight Howard (29)	Dwight Howard (16)	Jameer Nelson (6)	Amway Arena; 17,461	37–19
57	February 21	Cleveland	W 101–95	Dwight Howard (22)	Dwight Howard (16)	Jameer Nelson (5)	Amway Arena; 17,461	38–19
58	February 24	@ Houston	W 110–92	Dwight Howard (30)	Dwight Howard (16)	Jameer Nelson (9)	Toyota Center; 15,749	39–19
59	February 26	@ New Orleans	L 93–100	Dwight Howard (26)	Dwight Howard (10)	Jameer Nelson (11)	New Orleans Arena; 16,954	39–20
60	February 28	Miami	W 96–80	Rashard Lewis (22)	Matt Barnes (8)	Jameer Nelson (4)	Amway Arena; 17,461	40–20

March: 12–2 (home: 7–1; road: 5–1)

Game	Date	Team	Score	High points	High rebounds	High assists	Location Attendance	Record
61	March 1	@ Philadelphia	W 126–105	Jameer Nelson (22)	Vince Carter (7)	Jameer Nelson (10)	Wachovia Center; 15,817	41–20
62	March 3	Golden State	W 117–90	Dwight Howard (28)	Dwight Howard (12)	Jameer Nelson (4)	Amway Arena; 17,461	42–20
63	March 5	@ New Jersey	W 97–87	Matt Barnes (16)	Dwight Howard (16)	Jameer Nelson (8)	Izod Center; 15,320	43–20
64	March 7	L.A. Lakers	W 96–94	Vince Carter (25)	Dwight Howard (16)	Jameer Nelson (7)	Amway Arena; 17,461	44–20
65	March 9	L.A. Clippers	W 113–87	Dwight Howard (22)	Dwight Howard (15)	Jameer Nelson (8)	Amway Arena; 17,461	45–20
66	March 11	Chicago	W 111–82	Vince Carter (23)	Marcin Gortat (11)	JJ Redick, Jason Williams (4)	Amway Arena; 17,461	46–20
67	March 13	@ Washington	W 109–95	Dwight Howard (28)	Dwight Howard (15)	Jameer Nelson (8)	Verizon Center; 20,173	47–20
68	March 14	Charlotte	L 89–96	Dwight Howard (27)	Dwight Howard (16)	Vince Carter (6)	Amway Arena; 17,461	47–21
69	March 17	San Antonio	W 110–84	Vince Carter (24)	Marcin Gortat (10)	Vince Carter (8)	Amway Arena; 17,461	48–21
70	March 18	@ Miami	W 108–102 (OT)	Vince Carter (27)	Dwight Howard, Rashard Lewis (11)	Vince Carter (6)	American Airlines Arena; 18,874	49–21
71	March 22	@ Philadelphia	W 109–93	Rashard Lewis (24)	Dwight Howard (15)	Jameer Nelson (6)	Wachovia Center; 13,995	50–21
72	March 24	@ Atlanta	L 84–86	Jameer Nelson (20)	Dwight Howard (24)	Jameer Nelson (8)	Philips Arena; 16,887	50–22
73	March 26	Minnesota	W 106–97	Dwight Howard (24)	Dwight Howard (19)	Jameer Nelson (7)	Amway Arena; 17,461	51–22
74	March 28	Denver	W 103–97	JJ Redick (23)	Dwight Howard (11)	JJ Redick (8)	Amway Arena; 17,461	52–22

April: 7–1 (home: 4–0; road: 3–1)

Game	Date	Team	Score	High points	High rebounds	High assists	Location Attendance	Record
75	April 1	@ Dallas	W 97–82	Mickaël Piétrus (24)	Dwight Howard (20)	Jameer Nelson (7)	American Airlines Center; 19,965	53–22
76	April 2	@ San Antonio	L 100–112	Rashard Lewis, Mickaël Piétrus (18)	Marcin Gortat (7)	Jameer Nelson (6)	AT&T Center; 18,581	53–23
77	April 4	Memphis	W 107–92	Vince Carter (26)	Dwight Howard (11)	Vince Carter (6)	Amway Arena; 17,461	54–23
78	April 7	Washington	W 121–94	Dwight Howard (17)	Dwight Howard (10)	Jameer Nelson (6)	Amway Arena; 17,461	55–23
79	April 9	New York	W 118–103	Vince Carter, Dwight Howard (25)	Dwight Howard (13)	Vince Carter, Jameer Nelson, Jason Williams (5)	Amway Arena; 17,461	56–23
80	April 11	@ Cleveland	W 98–92	Dwight Howard (22)	Dwight Howard (13)	Jameer Nelson (8)	Quicken Loans Arena; 20,562	57–23
81	April 12	@ Indiana	W 118–98	Vince Carter (21)	Matt Barnes, Dwight Howard (11)	Jameer Nelson (8)	Conseco Fieldhouse; 18,165	58–23
82	April 14	Philadelphia	W 125–111	Jameer Nelson (21)	Dwight Howard (12)	Vince Carter (6)	Amway Arena; 17,461	59–23

2009–10 season schedule

== Playoffs ==
=== Game log ===
2010 playoff game log
First Round: 4–0 (home: 2–0; road: 2–0)

Game	Date	Team	Score	High points	High rebounds	High assists	Location Attendance	Series
1	April 18	Charlotte	W 98–89	Jameer Nelson (32)	Dwight Howard (7)	Jameer Nelson (6)	Amway Arena; 17,461	1–0
2	April 21	Charlotte	W 92–77	Vince Carter (19)	Dwight Howard (9)	Jameer Nelson (5)	Amway Arena; 17,461	2–0
3	April 24	@ Charlotte	W 90–86	Jameer Nelson (32)	Marcin Gortat, Dwight Howard (8)	Matt Barnes, Dwight Howard, Rashard Lewis, Jameer Nelson (3)	Time Warner Cable Arena; 19,596	3–0
4	April 26	@ Charlotte	W 99–90	Vince Carter (21)	Dwight Howard (13)	Vince Carter, Jameer Nelson (4)	Time Warner Cable Arena; 19,086	4–0

Conference Semifinals: 4–0 (home: 2–0; road: 2–0)

Game	Date	Team	Score	High points	High rebounds	High assists	Location Attendance	Series
1	May 4	Atlanta	W 114–71	Dwight Howard (21)	Dwight Howard (12)	Jameer Nelson (5)	Amway Arena; 17,461	1–0
2	May 6	Atlanta	W 112–98	Dwight Howard (29)	Dwight Howard (17)	Rashard Lewis, Jameer Nelson (6)	Amway Arena; 17,461	2–0
3	May 8	@ Atlanta	W 105–75	Rashard Lewis (22)	Dwight Howard (16)	Jameer Nelson (4)	Philips Arena; 18,729	3–0
4	May 10	@ Atlanta	W 98–84	Vince Carter (22)	Ryan Anderson, Dwight Howard (8)	Jameer Nelson (9)	Philips Arena; 18,729	4–0

Conference Finals: 2–4 (home: 1–2; road: 1–2)

Game	Date	Team	Score	High points	High rebounds	High assists	Location Attendance	Series
1	May 16	Boston	L 88–92	Vince Carter (23)	Dwight Howard (12)	Vince Carter, Dwight Howard, Rashard Lewis, Jameer Nelson (2)	Amway Arena; 17,461	0–1
2	May 18	Boston	L 92–95	Dwight Howard (30)	Dwight Howard (8)	Rashard Lewis, Jameer Nelson, JJ Redick (4)	Amway Arena; 17,461	0–2
3	May 22	@ Boston	L 71–94	Vince Carter, Jameer Nelson (15)	Dwight Howard (7)	Matt Barnes, Vince Carter, JJ Redick (2)	TD Garden; 18,624	0–3
4	May 24	@ Boston	W 96–92 (OT)	Dwight Howard (32)	Dwight Howard (16)	Jameer Nelson (9)	TD Garden; 18,624	1–3
5	May 26	Boston	W 113–92	Jameer Nelson (24)	Dwight Howard (10)	Jameer Nelson, Jason Williams (5)	Amway Arena; 17,461	2–3
6	May 28	@ Boston	L 84–96	Dwight Howard (28)	Dwight Howard (12)	Jameer Nelson (6)	TD Garden; 18,624	2–4

2010 playoff schedule

== Player statistics ==
=== Regular season ===
Player	POS	GP	GS	MP	REB	AST	STL	BLK	PTS	MPG	RPG	APG	SPG	BPG	PPG
Dwight Howard	C	82	82	2,843	1,082	144	75	228	1,503	34.7	13.2	1.8	.9	2.8	18.3
Jason Williams	PG	82	18	1,703	126	298	53	3	493	20.8	1.5	3.6	.6	.0	6.0
JJ Redick	SG	82	9	1,808	155	158	28	4	788	22.0	1.9	1.9	.3	.0	9.6
Matt Barnes	SF	81	58	2,097	445	134	59	30	716	25.9	5.5	1.7	.7	.4	8.8
Marcin Gortat	C	81	0	1,088	341	17	17	70	293	13.4	4.2	.2	.2	.9	3.6
Vince Carter	SG	75	74	2,310	293	236	53	18	1,244	30.8	3.9	3.1	.7	.2	16.6
Mickaël Piétrus	SF	75	24	1,687	215	49	53	31	651	22.5	2.9	.7	.7	.4	8.7
Rashard Lewis	PF	72	72	2,369	318	107	78	28	1,013	32.9	4.4	1.5	1.1	.4	14.1
Jameer Nelson	PG	65	64	1,860	194	353	48	2	818	28.6	3.0	5.4	.7	.0	12.6
Ryan Anderson	PF	63	6	911	202	37	25	14	487	14.5	3.2	.6	.4	.2	7.7
Brandon Bass	PF	50	3	648	127	19	12	27	290	13.0	2.5	.4	.2	.5	5.8
Anthony Johnson	PG	31	0	406	48	63	11	1	130	13.1	1.5	2.0	.4	.0	4.2

=== Playoffs ===
Player	POS	GP	GS	MP	REB	AST	STL	BLK	PTS	MPG	RPG	APG	SPG	BPG	PPG
Rashard Lewis	PF	14	14	512	79	32	15	10	180	36.6	5.6	2.3	1.1	.7	12.9
Dwight Howard	C	14	14	497	155	19	11	49	254	35.5	11.1	1.4	.8	3.5	18.1
Vince Carter	SG	14	14	480	59	32	12	3	217	34.3	4.2	2.3	.9	.2	15.5
Jameer Nelson	PG	14	14	479	50	67	14	0	266	34.2	3.6	4.8	1.0	.0	19.0
Matt Barnes	SF	14	14	326	66	19	10	3	89	23.3	4.7	1.4	.7	.2	6.4
Mickaël Piétrus	SF	14	0	282	20	10	9	6	118	20.1	1.4	.7	.6	.4	8.4
JJ Redick	SG	14	0	269	24	19	10	0	105	19.2	1.7	1.4	.7	.0	7.5
Marcin Gortat	C	14	0	212	62	9	3	4	42	15.1	4.4	.6	.2	.3	3.0
Jason Williams	PG	14	0	192	11	23	4	0	37	13.7	.8	1.6	.3	.0	2.6
Ryan Anderson	PF	9	0	89	31	3	2	2	23	9.9	3.4	.3	.2	.2	2.6
Brandon Bass	PF	7	0	42	8	1	0	0	19	6.0	1.1	.1	.0	.0	2.7
Anthony Johnson	PG	1	0	5	0	2	0	0	2	5.0	.0	2.0	.0	.0	2.0

== Awards, records and milestones ==
=== Awards and honors ===
- Dwight Howard – Defensive Player of the Year, All-NBA 1st Team, All-Defensive 1st Team, Rebounding Champion, Blocks Champion, Field goal percentage leader, All-Star
- Stan Van Gundy – All-Star East Head Coach

==== Player of the Week ====
- October 27–November 1 – Dwight Howard
- December 14–20 – Dwight Howard
- February 15–21 – Dwight Howard
- April 5–11 – Dwight Howard

==== Coach of the Month ====
- October–November – Stan Van Gundy
- April – Stan Van Gundy

== Injuries and surgeries ==
Though he was not expected to get much playing time, Adonal Foyle underwent arthroscopic surgery on his right knee on October 21, a little more than a week before the start of the season. His return depends on how well his knee recovers with treatment.

Vince Carter was injured on October 30 during the second game of the season, suffering a sprained left ankle. The injury was reported as not too serious, but caused Carter to miss four of the Magic's next five games.

Ryan Anderson injured his ankle in the game against Detroit on November 3. He missed the following 4 games before returning to play against the Bobcats.

Jameer Nelson suffered a torn meniscus in his left knee during the 4th quarter of a game on November 16. The next day it was revealed that arthroscopic surgery would be required to repair the injury. He was expected to be out 4–6 weeks, but a report later in the week stated his teammates expected him to be gone for only 3 weeks. Ultimately, Nelson would return to action on December 21, five weeks to the day of his injury.

== Minor League Affiliate ==
The Magic are affiliated with the Reno Bighorns of the D-League. They replace the Bakersfield Jam for the 2009–10 season.
