= 2009–10 New Jersey Nets season =

NBA professional basketball team season

- Head coach: Lawrence Frank; Tom Barrise; Kiki Vandeweghe
- Arena: Izod Center

Results
- Record: 12–70 (.146)
- Place: Division: 5th (Atlantic); Conference: 15th (Eastern)
- Playoff finish: Did not qualify
- Stats at Basketball Reference

Local media
- Television: YES Network, WWOR
- Radio: WFAN

The 2009–10 New Jersey Nets season was the 43rd season of the franchise, 34th in the National Basketball Association (NBA). This was the team's final season at the Izod Center. With a loss to the Dallas Mavericks on December 2, 2009, the Nets became the first team in NBA history to start the season 0–18. The Nets got their first win of the season in game 19 at home against the Charlotte Bobcats on December 4, 2009. With a loss to the Houston Rockets on December 26, 2009, the Nets became the sixth team in NBA history to lose 28 of its first 30 games, tying the worst 30-game record in NBA history. With a loss to the Utah Jazz on January 23, 2010, the Nets became the third team in NBA history to lose 40 of its first 43 games, tying the worst three-win record in NBA history. On February 6, the Nets lost to the Detroit Pistons, falling to 4–46 and tying the record for the worst 50-game record in the history of the three major sports (NBA, MLB, NHL) that play seasons that long.

== Key dates ==
- June 25 – The 2009 NBA draft took place in New York City.
- July 8 – The free agency period started.
- November 29 – Lawrence Frank was relieved of his duties as head coach after the team began the season with 16 consecutive losses, one shy of the NBA record. This streak was ongoing at the time of his dismissal. Tom Barrise, who previously served as assistant coach under Frank, became his replacement as interim head coach for the Nets' game that night against the Los Angeles Lakers, which the Nets lost 106–87 for their record-tying 17th consecutive loss. After a two-game stint by Barrise, general manager Kiki Vandeweghe was named the head coach for the remainder of the season, and Del Harris was given a position as assistant coach.
- December 4 – New Jersey Nets defeated the Charlotte Bobcats to break 18-game losing streak.
- April 12 – New Jersey Nets play final home game at Meadowlands Arena.

== Draft picks ==
Round	Pick	Player	Position	Nationality	College
1	11	Terrence Williams	Small forward	United States	Louisville

== Roster ==
2009–10 New Jersey Nets roster
Players

Pos.	No.	Player	Height	Weight	DOB	From
F/C	7	Tony Battie	6 ft 11 in (2.11 m)	240 lb (109 kg)	1976–02–11	Texas Tech
F/C	2	Josh Boone	6 ft 10 in (2.08 m)	240 lb (109 kg)	1984–11–21	Connecticut
G	55	Keyon Dooling	6 ft 3 in (1.91 m)	195 lb (88 kg)	1980–05–08	Missouri
G/F	17	Chris Douglas-Roberts	6 ft 7 in (2.01 m)	200 lb (91 kg)	1987–01–08	Memphis
G	34	Devin Harris	6 ft 3 in (1.91 m)	185 lb (84 kg)	1983–02–27	Wisconsin
F	44	Trenton Hassell	6 ft 5 in (1.96 m)	233 lb (106 kg)	1979–03–04	Austin Peay
F	22	Jarvis Hayes	6 ft 8 in (2.03 m)	228 lb (103 kg)	1981–08–09	Georgia
F	43	Kris Humphries	6 ft 9 in (2.06 m)	235 lb (107 kg)	1985–02–06	Minnesota
G/F	6	Courtney Lee	6 ft 5 in (1.96 m)	200 lb (91 kg)	1985–10–03	Western Kentucky
C	11	Brook Lopez	7 ft 0 in (2.13 m)	260 lb (118 kg)	1988–04–01	Stanford
G	1	Chris Quinn	6 ft 2 in (1.88 m)	175 lb (79 kg)	1983–09–27	Notre Dame
F	21	Bobby Simmons (IN)	6 ft 6 in (1.98 m)	230 lb (104 kg)	1980–06–02	DePaul
G/F	8	Terrence Williams	6 ft 6 in (1.98 m)	220 lb (100 kg)	1987–06–28	Louisville
F/C	9	Jianlian Yi	7 ft 0 in (2.13 m)	238 lb (108 kg)	1987–10–27	China

Coaches
Head coach
- Kiki Vandeweghe
Assistant(s)
- John Loyer
- Doug Overton
- Roy Rogers

Legend
- (DP) Unsigned draft pick
- (FA) Free agent
- (S) Suspended
- Injured

== Pre-season ==
2009 Pre-season game log: 1–6 (Home: 1–2; Road: 0–4)
#	Date	Visitor	Score	Home	OT	Attendance	Record	Recap
1	October 4	New Jersey Nets	107–115	New York Knicks			0–1
2	October 9 (at Wachovia Center)	New Jersey Nets	92–93	Philadelphia 76ers			0–2
3	October 11 (at TD Garden)	New Jersey Nets	93–100	Boston Celtics			0–3
4	October 13 (in Newark, New Jersey)	Boston Celtics	91–88	New Jersey Nets			0–4
5	October 16 (at Madison Square Garden)	New Jersey Nets	89–93	New York Knicks			0–5
6	October 22 (in Newark, New Jersey)	New York Knicks	94–92	New Jersey Nets			0–6
7	October 23	Philadelphia	88–110	New Jersey Nets			1–6

== Regular season ==
=== Standings ===
Atlantic Division	W	L	PCT	GB	Home	Road	Div
y-Boston Celtics	50	32	.610	–	24–17	26–15	13–3
Toronto Raptors	40	42	.488	10	25–16	15–26	11–5
New York Knicks	29	53	.354	21	18–23	11–30	6–10
Philadelphia 76ers	27	55	.329	23	12–29	15–26	7–9
New Jersey Nets	12	70	.146	38	8–33	4–37	3–13

#	Eastern Conference				
#	Team	W	L	PCT	GB
1	z-Cleveland Cavaliers	61	21	.744	–
2	y-Orlando Magic	59	23	.720	2
3	x-Atlanta Hawks	53	29	.646	8
4	y-Boston Celtics	50	32	.610	11
5	x-Miami Heat	47	35	.573	14
6	x-Milwaukee Bucks	46	36	.561	15
7	x-Charlotte Bobcats	44	38	.537	17
8	x-Chicago Bulls	41	41	.500	20
9	Toronto Raptors	40	42	.488	21
10	Indiana Pacers	32	50	.390	29
11	New York Knicks	29	53	.354	32
12	Philadelphia 76ers	27	55	.329	34
13	Detroit Pistons	27	55	.329	34
14	Washington Wizards	26	56	.317	35
15	New Jersey Nets	12	70	.146	49

=== Game log ===
2009–10 game log
Total: 12–70 (Home: 8–33; Road: 4–37)
October: 0–3 (home: 0–1; road: 0–2)

Game	Date	Team	Score	High points	High rebounds	High assists	Location Attendance	Record
1	October 28	@Minnesota	L 93–95	Brook Lopez (27)	Brook Lopez (15)	Devin Harris (8)	Target Center; 18,358	0–1
2	October 30	Orlando	L 85–95	Courtney Lee (18)	Josh Boone (8)	Devin Harris (7)	Izod Center; 17,525	0–2
3	October 31	@Washington	L 104–123	Chris Douglas-Roberts (25)	Yi Jianlian (7)	Rafer Alston (8)	Verizon Center; 20,173	0–3

November : 0–14 (home: 0–5; road: 0–9)

Game	Date	Team	Score	High points	High rebounds	High assists	Location Attendance	Record
4	November 2	@Charlotte	L 68–79	Chris Douglas-Roberts (20)	Bobby Simmons (7)	Rafer Alston (5)	Time Warner Cable Arena; 9,380	0–4
5	November 4	Denver	L 94–122	Chris Douglas-Roberts (19)	Brook Lopez (8)	Rafer Alston (4)	Izod Center; 15,319	0–5
6	November 6	@Philadelphia	L 94–97	Brook Lopez (22)	Trenton Hassell (12)	Terrence Williams (9)	Wachovia Center; 10,054	0–6
7	November 7	Boston	L 76–86	Brook Lopez (23)	Josh Boone (12)	Rafer Alston (7)	Izod Center; 16,119	0–7
8	November 11	Philadelphia	L 79–82	Brook Lopez (23)	Brook Lopez (14)	Rafer Alston (5)	Izod Center; 10,714	0–8
9	November 13	@Orlando	L 72–88	Rafer Alston (17)	Terrence Williams (12)	Rafer Alston (10)	Amway Arena; 17,461	0–9
10	November 14	@Miami	L 80–81	Hassell & Lopez (17)	Brook Lopez (9)	Rafer Alston (3)	American Airlines Arena; 17,124	0–10
11	November 17	Indiana	L 83–91	Chris Douglas-Roberts (27)	Brook Lopez (16)	Rafer Alston (4)	Izod Center; 11,332	0–11
12	November 18	@Milwaukee	L 85–99	Chris Douglas-Roberts (31)	Douglas-Roberts & Williams (10)	Bobby Simmons (4)	Bradley Center; 13,479	0–12
13	November 21	New York	L 91–98	Chris Douglas-Roberts (24)	Brook Lopez (12)	Devin Harris (7)	Izod Center; 14,050	0–13
14	November 24	@Denver	L 87–101	Alston & Harris (19)	Josh Boone (12)	Devin Harris (6)	Pepsi Center; 16,307	0–14
15	November 25	@Portland	L 83–93	Brook Lopez (32)	Brook Lopez (14)	Rafer Alston (6)	Rose Garden Arena; 20,322	0–15
16	November 27	@Sacramento	L 96–109	Devin Harris (25)	Brook Lopez (11)	Alston & Devin Harris (3)	ARCO Arena; 12,725	0–16
17	November 29	@LA Lakers	L 87–106	Brook Lopez (26)	Brook Lopez (12)	Devin Harris (6)	Staples Center; 18,997	0–17

December : 3–12 (home: 2–7; road: 1–5)

Game	Date	Team	Score	High points	High rebounds	High assists	Location Attendance	Record
18	December 2	Dallas	L 101–117	Chris Douglas-Roberts (24)	Lee & Lopez (6)	Terrence Williams (6)	Izod Center; 11,689	0–18
19	December 4	Charlotte	W 97–91	Brook Lopez (31)	Brook Lopez (14)	Devin Harris (8)	Izod Center; 12,131	1–18
20	December 6	@New York	L 97–106	Chris Douglas-Roberts (26)	Josh Boone (7)	Devin Harris (6)	Madison Square Garden; 19,602	1–19
21	December 8	@Chicago	W 103–101	Brook Lopez (25)	Boone & Lopez (10)	Devin Harris (6)	United Center; 17,872	2–19
22	December 9	Golden State	L 89–105	Brook Lopez (21)	Brook Lopez (10)	Courtney Lee (3)	Izod Center; 10,005	2-20
23	December 11	@Indiana	L 91–107	Brook Lopez (25)	Brook Lopez (14)	Alston & Harris (3)	Conseco Fieldhouse; 12,175	2-21
24	December 13	@Atlanta	L 107–130	Devin Harris (23)	Brook Lopez (12)	Devin Harris (9)	Philips Arena; 14,015	2-22
25	December 15	@Cleveland	L 89–99	Lopez & Harris (22)	Brook Lopez (15)	Alston & Harris (3)	Quicken Loans Arena; 20,562	2-23
26	December 16	Utah	L 92–108	Brook Lopez (23)	Josh Boone (11)	Devin Harris (6)	Izod Center; 11,476	2-24
27	December 18	@Toronto	L 95–118	Chris Douglas-Roberts (16)	Brook Lopez (8)	Three players (4)	Air Canada Centre; 15,901	2-25
28	December 19	LA Lakers	L 84–103	Devin Harris (21)	Brook Lopez (11)	Brook Lopez (4)	Izod Center; 17,190	2-26
29	December 23	Minnesota	L 99–103	Devin Harris (23)	Brook Lopez (10)	Devin Harris (8)	Izod Center; 10,204	2-27
30	December 26	Houston	L 93–98	Devin Harris (19)	Brook Lopez (11)	Keyon Dooling & Harris (6)	Izod Center; 13,374	2-28
31	December 28	Oklahoma City	L 89–105	Yi Jianlian (29)	Jianlian & Lopez (7)	Devin Harris (11)	Izod Center; 15,335	2-29
32	December 30	New York	W 104–95	Yi Jianlian (22)	Brook Lopez (14)	Devin Harris (8)	Izod Center; 17,575	3-29

January : 1–13 (home: 1–6; road: 0–7)

Game	Date	Team	Score	High points	High rebounds	High assists	Location Attendance	Record
33	January 2	Cleveland	L 86–94	Devin Harris (22)	Yi Jianlian (8)	Devin Harris (6)	Izod Center; 17,569	3-30
34	January 5	Milwaukee	L 76–98	Yi Jianlian (22)	Brook Lopez (7)	Devin Harris (7)	Izod Center; 11,101	3-31
35	January 6	@Atlanta	L 89–119	Yi Jianlian (19)	Yi Jianlian (11)	Devin Harris (8)	Philips Arena; 11,219	3-32
36	January 8	@New Orleans	L 99–103	Courtney Lee (28)	Yi Jianlian (10)	Courtney Lee (6)	New Orleans Arena; 15,555	3-33
37	January 10	@San Antonio	L 85–97	Brook Lopez (28)	Brook Lopez (11)	Dooling & Lee (5)	AT&T Center; 18,047	3-34
38	January 13	Boston	L 87–111	Yi Jianlian (19)	Brook Lopez (10)	Devin Harris (6)	Izod Center; 14,112	3-35
39	January 15	Indiana	L 105–121	Brook Lopez (27)	Yi Jianlian (10)	Devin Harris (9)	Izod Center; 13,656	3-36
40	January 18	@LA Clippers	L 95–106	Brook Lopez (23)	Brook Lopez (8)	Devin Harris (8)	Staples Center; 14,533	3-37
41	January 20	@Phoenix	L 94–118	Brook Lopez (26)	Brook Lopez (13)	Devin Harris (7)	US Airways Center; 15,963	3-38
42	January 22	@Golden State	L 79–111	Brook Lopez (21)	Yi Jianlian (11)	Terrence Williams (4)	Oracle Arena; 17,308	3-39
43	January 23	@Utah	L 83–116	Yi Jianlian (16)	Terrence Williams (6)	Four players (3)	EnergySolutions Arena; 19,911	3-40
44	January 27	LA Clippers	W 103–87	Kris Humphries (25)	Brook Lopez, Terrence Williams (9)	Keyon Dooling, Terrence Williams (8)	Izod Center; 9,220	4-40
45	January 29	Washington	L 79–81	Courtney Lee (19)	Chris Douglas-Roberts (9)	Keyon Dooling (6)	Izod Center; 11,384	4-41
46	January 31	Philadelphia	L 79–83	Jarvis Hayes, Brook Lopez (18)	Yi Jianlian (12)	Keyon Dooling (7)	Izod Center; 11,576	4–42

February : 2–11 (home: 0–7; road: 2–4)

Game	Date	Team	Score	High points	High rebounds	High assists	Location Attendance	Record
47	February 2	Detroit	L 93–97	Brook Lopez (27)	Kris Humphries (12)	Devin Harris (14)	Izod Center; 9,417	4-43
48	February 3	@Toronto	L 99–108	Devin Harris, Yi Jianlian (15)	Kris Humphries (11)	Devin Harris (8)	Air Canada Centre; 15,222	4-44
49	February 5	@Boston	L 87–96	Brook Lopez (19)	Kris Humphries (8)	Devin Harris (8)	TD Garden; 18,624	4-45
50	February 6	@Detroit	L 92–99	Devin Harris (21)	Kris Humphries (9)	Devin Harris (7)	The Palace of Auburn Hills; 20,176	4-46
51	February 9	@Cleveland	L 97–104	Courtney Lee (24)	Brook Lopez (14)	Keyon Dooling (7)	Quicken Loans Arena; 20,562	4-47
52	February 10	Milwaukee	L 77–97	Devin Harris (27)	Yi Jianlian (14)	Devin Harris (9)	Izod Center; 12,873	4-48
53	February 16	@Charlotte	W 103–94	Courtney Lee (21)	Kris Humphries, Josh Boone (8)	Devin Harris (9)	Time Warner Cable Arena; 13,712	5-48
54	February 17	Miami	L 84–87	Brook Lopez (26)	Kris Humphries (12)	Devin Harris (6)	Izod Center; 12,251	5-49
55	February 19	Toronto	L 89–106	Brook Lopez (22)	Brook Lopez (8)	Devin Harris (11)	Izod Center; 11,994	5-50
56	February 21	Memphis	L 94–104	Brook Lopez (26)	Brook Lopez, Josh Boone (9)	Devin Harris (13)	Izod Center; 12,076	5-51
57	February 23	Portland	L 93–102	Devin Harris, Courtney Lee (28)	Brook Lopez (10)	Devin Harris (5)	Izod Center; 11,138	5-52
58	February 27	@Boston	W 104–96	Brook Lopez (25)	Kris Humphries, Yi Jianlian (10)	Devin Harris (5)	TD Garden; 18,624	6-52
59	February 28	Washington	L 85–89	Yi Jianlian (20)	Yi Jianlian (19)	Devin Harris (14)	Izod Center; 11,844	6-53

March : 4–12 (home: 3–6; road: 1–6)

Game	Date	Team	Score	High points	High rebounds	High assists	Location Attendance	Record
60	March 3	Cleveland	L 92–111	Terrence Williams, Brook Lopez (21)	Brook Lopez (14)	Terrence Williams (7)	Izod Center; 17,502	6-54
61	March 5	Magic	L 87–97	Brook Lopez (18)	Brook Lopez (8)	Devin Harris (10)	Izod Center; 15,320	6-55
62	March 6	@New York	W 113–93	Devin Harris (31)	Brook Lopez, Terrence Williams (11)	Terrence Williams (7)	Madison Square Garden; 19,763	7-55
63	March 8	@Memphis	L 101–107	Courtney Lee (30)	Josh Boone (9)	Terrence Williams, Brook Lopez (6)	FedExForum	7-56
64	March 10	@Dallas	L 87–96	Devin Harris (21)	Terrence Williams (13)	Devin Harris (7)	American Airlines Center	7-57
65	March 12	@Oklahoma City	L 102–104	Devin Harris (19)	Brook Lopez, Josh Boone (8)	Devin Harris (8)	Ford Center	7-58
66	March 13	@Houston	L 108–116	Courtney Lee (24)	Brook Lopez (10)	Devin Harris (7)	Toyota Center	7-59
67	March 16	Atlanta	L 84–108	Brook Lopez (21)	Josh Boone (20)	Keyon Dooling (6)	Izod Center	7-60
68	March 17	@Philadelphia	L 97–108	Chris Douglas-Roberts (23)	Josh Boone (8)	Terrence Williams, Keyon Dooling (3)	Wachovia Center	7-61
69	March 20	Toronto	L 90–100	Devin Harris (22)	Brook Lopez (13)	Devin Harris (7)	Izod Center	7-62
70	March 22	Miami	L 89–99	Brook Lopez (26)	Kris Humphries (9)	Terrence Williams (7)	Izod Center	7-63
71	March 24	Sacramento	W 93–79	Brook Lopez (26)	Brook Lopez (13)	Devin Harris (9)	Izod Center	8-63
72	March 26	Detroit	W 118–110	Brook Lopez (37)	Brook Lopez (10)	Devin Harris (12)	Izod Center	9-63
73	March 27	@Chicago	L 83–106	Terrence Williams (16)	Kris Humphries, Yi Jianlian (8)	Devin Harris (9)	United Center	9-64
74	March 29	San Antonio	W 90–84	Brook Lopez (22)	Brook Lopez (12)	Devin Harris (9)	Izod Center	10–64
75	March 31	Phoenix	L 105–116	Terrence Williams (21)	Brook Lopez (8)	Terrence Williams, Devin Harris (9)	Izod Center	10–65

April : 2–5 (home: 2–1; road: 0–4)

Game	Date	Team	Score	High points	High rebounds	High assists	Location Attendance	Record
76	April 3	New Orleans	W 115–87	Chris Douglas-Roberts (17)	Kris Humphries (12)	Terrence Williams (14)	Izod Center	11–65
77	April 4	@Washington	L 99–109	Devin Harris, Brook Lopez (22)	Yi Jianlian, Kris Humphries (7)	Brook Lopez, Terrence Williams (4)	Verizon Center	11–66
78	April 7	@Milwaukee	L 89–108	Devin Harris (25)	Yi Jianlian (8)	Brook Lopez (7)	Bradley Center	11–67
79	April 9	Chicago	W 127–116 (OT)	Terrence Williams (27)	Brook Lopez (14)	Terrence Williams (10)	Izod Center	12–67
80	April 10	@Indiana	L 102–115	Brook Lopez (20)	Terrence Williams (8)	Terrence Williams (7)	Conseco Fieldhouse	12–68
81	April 12	Charlotte	L 95–105	Devin Harris (22)	Terrence Williams (13)	Terrence Williams (6)	Izod Center	12–69
82	April 14	@Miami	L 86–94 (OT)	Yi Jianlian (23)	Yi Jianlian (15)	Devin Harris, Terrence Williams (3)	AmericanAirlines Arena	12–70

2009–10 season schedule

== Player statistics ==
=== Regular season ===
New Jersey Nets statistics
Player	GP	GS	MPG	FG%	3P%	FT%	RPG	APG	SPG	BPG	PPG
Tony Battie	15	0	8.9	.350	.250	.700	1.5	.2	.3	.1	2.4
Josh Boone	63	28	16.6	.525	.000	.328	5.0	.5	.5	.8	4.0
Keyon Dooling	53	8	18.3	.398	.376	.770	1.0	2.5	.6	.0	6.9
Chris Douglas-Roberts	67	38	25.8	.445	.259	.847	3.0	1.4	.8	.3	9.8
Devin Harris	64	61	34.7	.403	.276	.798	3.2	6.6	1.2	.3	16.9
Trenton Hassell	52	31	21.3	.411	.000	.754	2.9	1.0	.3	.2	4.5
Jarvis Hayes	45	9	23.0	.421	.335	.778	2.4	.9	.6	.2	7.8
Kris Humphries	44	0	20.6	.433	.000	.699	6.4	.6	.7	.8	8.1
Courtney Lee	71	66	33.5	.436	.338	.869	3.5	1.7	1.3	.3	12.5
Brook Lopez	82	82	36.9	.499	.000	.817	8.6	2.3	.7	1.7	18.8
Chris Quinn	25	0	8.9	.357	.313	1.000	.6	1.2	.4	.0	2.2
Bobby Simmons	23	2	17.2	.359	.317	.900	2.7	.7	.6	.1	5.3
Terrence Williams	78	9	22.6	.401	.310	.715	4.5	2.9	.6	.1	8.4
Yi Jianlian	52	51	31.8	.403	.366	.798	7.2	.9	.7	1.0	12.0

== Awards, records and milestones ==
=== Records ===
==== NBA ====
- Worst winless start of season in NBA history (0–18)
  - The 2015–16 Philadelphia 76ers also started 0–18
- Worst 30-game start in NBA history at that time (2–28)
  - The 1970–71 Cleveland Cavaliers, 1992–93 Dallas Mavericks, 1993–94 Dallas Mavericks, 1997–98 Denver Nuggets, and 2004–05 New Orleans Hornets also started 2–28. Record broken by the 2015–16 Philadelphia 76ers with a 1–29 record.
- Worst 3-win start in NBA history (3–40)
  - The 1993–94 Dallas Mavericks and 1997–98 Denver Nuggets also started 3–40.
- Worst 50-game start in sports history (4–46)
  - The 1972–73 Philadelphia 76ers and 1992–93 Dallas Mavericks also started 4–46.

==== Franchise ====
- Most points allowed in any one quarter (49; second quarter) – December 2, 2009 vs. Dallas Mavericks

=== Milestones ===
- Terrence Williams recorded his first career triple-double in a win over the Chicago Bulls

== Injuries and surgeries ==
Devin Harris missed 10 games at the beginning of November due to a groin strain before returning on November 21 against the New York Knicks.

In addition, at one point the entire starting lineup, with the exception of center Brook Lopez, was injured. For a considerable portion of the season the Nets were forced to play extremely short-handed, and multiple times were able to dress only the league-minimum seven players.

== Transactions ==
New Jersey Nets
Players Added ----

Via Draft

- Terrence Williams

Via Trade

- Rafer Alston (From Orlando)
- Tony Battie (From Orlando)
- Courtney Lee (From Orlando)
- Kris Humphries (From Dallas)
- Chris Quinn (From Miami)
Players Lost ----

Via Trade

- Ryan Anderson (To Orlando)
- Vince Carter (To Orlando)
- Rafer Alston (To Miami)
- Eduardo Nájera (To Dallas)
