= 2009–10 Atlanta Hawks season =

NBA professional basketball team season

- Head coach: Mike Woodson
- Owners: Atlanta Spirit LLC
- Arena: Philips Arena

Results
- Record: 53–29 (.646)
- Place: Division: 2nd (Southeast); Conference: 3rd (Eastern)
- Playoff finish: Conference Semifinals (lost to Magic 0–4)
- Stats at Basketball Reference

Local media
- Television: Fox Sports South; SportSouth
- Radio: WQXI

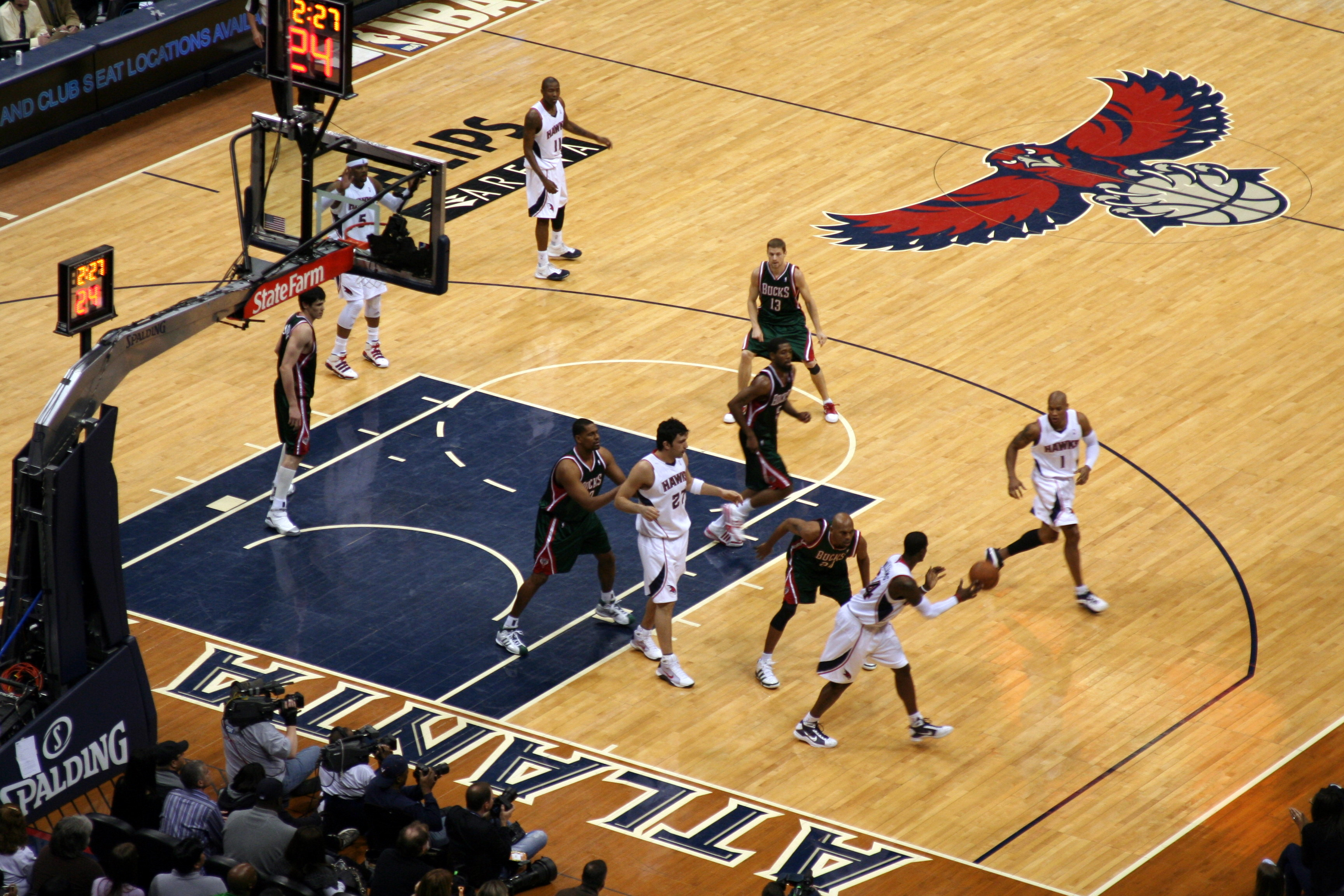
Atlanta Hawks v Milwaukee Bucks 03 2010

The 2009–10 Atlanta Hawks season was the 61st season of the franchise in the National Basketball Association (NBA). In the playoffs, the team defeated the Milwaukee Bucks in seven games in the first round, but were swept by the Orlando Magic in the second round. The Hawks had the second best team offensive rating in the NBA.

== Key dates ==
- June 25 – The 2009 NBA draft took place in New York City.
- July 8 – The free agency period started.

== Roster ==
2009–10 Atlanta Hawks roster
Players

Pos.	No.	Player	Height	Weight	DOB	From
G	10	Mike Bibby	6 ft 1 in (1.85 m)	190 lb (86 kg)	1978–05–13	Arizona
C	34	Jason Collins	7 ft 0 in (2.13 m)	255 lb (116 kg)	1978–12–02	Stanford
G	11	Jamal Crawford	6 ft 6 in (1.98 m)	185 lb (84 kg)	1980–03–20	Michigan
G/F	1	Maurice Evans	6 ft 5 in (1.96 m)	220 lb (100 kg)	1978–11–08	Texas
F/C	15	Al Horford	6 ft 10 in (2.08 m)	250 lb (113 kg)	1986–06–03	Florida
G	2	Joe Johnson	6 ft 7 in (2.01 m)	240 lb (109 kg)	1981–06–29	Arkansas
C	33	Randolph Morris (IN)	6 ft 11 in (2.11 m)	275 lb (125 kg)	1986–01–02	Kentucky
C	27	Zaza Pachulia	6 ft 11 in (2.11 m)	275 lb (125 kg)	1984–02–10	Republic of Georgia
F/C	32	Joe Smith	6 ft 10 in (2.08 m)	225 lb (102 kg)	1975–07–26	Maryland
F	5	Josh Smith	6 ft 9 in (2.06 m)	225 lb (102 kg)	1985–12–05	Oak Hill Academy (VA)
G	0	Jeff Teague	6 ft 2 in (1.88 m)	181 lb (82 kg)	1988–06–10	Wake Forest
G	6	Mario West	6 ft 5 in (1.96 m)	210 lb (95 kg)	1984–06–19	Georgia Tech
F	24	Marvin Williams	6 ft 9 in (2.06 m)	245 lb (111 kg)	1986–06–19	North Carolina

Coaches
Head coach
- Mike Woodson
Assistant(s)
- Larry Drew
- Bob Bender
- Jim Todd
- Tyrone Hill

Legend
- (DP) Unsigned draft pick
- (FA) Free agent
- (S) Suspended
- Injured

== Pre-season ==
2009 pre-season game log
October: 5–2 (home: 3–0; road: 2–2)

Game	Date	Team	Score	High points	High rebounds	High assists	Location Attendance	Record
1	October 7	New Orleans Hornets	108–102	J. Teague (19)	M. West (11)	J. Smith (4); J. Johnson (4); M. Bibby (4)	8,024	1–0 recap
2	October 11	@Detroit Pistons	91–100	M. Williams (19)	A. Horford (7); J. Smith (7); O. Hunter (7)	J. Teague (8)	18,167	1–1 recap
3	October 12	Charlotte Bobcats	107–90	J. Teague (17)	A. Horford (6)	J. Teague (7)	6,860	2–1 recap
4	October 14	@Memphis Grizzlies	111–96	Maurice Evans (27)	A. Horford (5); R. Morris (5); O. Hunter (5)	J. Smith (4); M. Bibby (4); J. Teague (4)	7,141	3–1 recap
5	October 19	Washington Wizards	113–95	M. Williams (16); J. Teague (16)	M. Williams (6); A. Horford (6)	J. Crawford (9)	8,754	4–1 recap
6	October 22	@Miami Heat	92–87	J. Johnson (14)	A. Horford (10)	J. Johnson (8)	(Jacksonville, Florida); 10,113	5–1 recap
7	October 23	@Orlando Magic	86–123	J. Crawford (14)	J. Smith (6); A. Horford (6)	J. Teague (4)	17,343	5–2 recap

2009–10 season schedule

== Regular season ==
=== Standings ===
Southeast Division	W	L	PCT	GB	Home	Road	Div
y-Orlando Magic	59	23	.720	–	34–7	25–16	10–6
x-Atlanta Hawks	53	29	.646	6	34–7	19–22	8–8
x-Miami Heat	47	35	.573	12	24–17	23–18	9–7
x-Charlotte Bobcats	44	38	.537	15	31–10	13–28	10–6
Washington Wizards	26	56	.317	33	15–26	11–30	3–13

y – clinched division title
x – clinched playoff spot
e – eliminated from playoff contention

#	Eastern Conference				
#	Team	W	L	PCT	GB
1	z-Cleveland Cavaliers	61	21	.744	–
2	y-Orlando Magic	59	23	.720	2
3	x-Atlanta Hawks	53	29	.646	8
4	y-Boston Celtics	50	32	.610	11
5	x-Miami Heat	47	35	.573	14
6	x-Milwaukee Bucks	46	36	.561	15
7	x-Charlotte Bobcats	44	38	.537	17
8	x-Chicago Bulls	41	41	.500	20
9	Toronto Raptors	40	42	.488	21
10	Indiana Pacers	32	50	.390	29
11	New York Knicks	29	53	.354	32
12	Philadelphia 76ers	27	55	.329	34
13	Detroit Pistons	27	55	.329	34
14	Washington Wizards	26	56	.317	35
15	New Jersey Nets	12	70	.146	49

y – clinched division title
x – clinched playoff spot
e – eliminated from playoff contention

=== Game log ===
2009–10 game log
Total: 53–29 (home: 34–7; road: 19–22)
October: 2–0 (home: 2–0; road: 0–0)

Game	Date	Team	Score	High points	High rebounds	High assists	Location Attendance	Record
1	October 28	Pacers	W 120–109	J. Johnson (25)	A. Horford (16)	J. Smith (8)	Philips Arena; 17,998	1–0
2	October 30	Wizards	W 100–89	J. Smith (20)	A. Horford (12)	M. Bibby (7)	Philips Arena; 17,079	2–0

November : 10–5 (home: 5–1; road: 5–4)

Game	Date	Team	Score	High points	High rebounds	High assists	Location Attendance	Record
3	November 1	@ Lakers	L 110–118	J. Johnson (9)	J. Johnson, A. Horford (9)	J. Smith (7)	Staples Center; 18,997	2–1
4	November 3	@ Trail Blazers	W 97–91	J. Crawford (27)	A. Horford (13)	J. Crawford (7)	Rose Garden; 20,325	3–1
5	November 4	@ Kings	W 113–105	J. Crawford (26); J. Johnson (26)	J. Johnson (8); A. Horford (8)	J. Crawford (4); J. Johnson (4)	ARCO Arena; 11,751	4–1
6	November 6	@ Bobcats	L 83–103	J. Crawford (13); J. Johnson (13); J. Smith (13)	J. Smith (7)	J. Teague (3); M. Bibby (3)	Time Warner Cable Arena; 15,874	4–2
7	November 7	Nuggets	W 125–100	J. Crawford (25)	A. Horford (12)	J. Smith (7)	Philips Arena; 17,801	5–2
8	November 11	@ Knicks	W 114–101	A. Horfod (25)	J. Smith (12)	M. Bibby (9)	Madison Square Garden; 19,699	6–2
9	November 13	@ Celtics	W 97–86	J. Johnson (24)	A. Horford (13)	M. Bibby (6)	TD Garden; 18,624	7–2
10	November 14	Hornets	W 121–98	J. Johnson (26)	J. Smith (17)	J. Johnson (7)	Philips Arena; 18,572	8–2
11	November 16	Trail Blazers	W 99–95	J. Johnson (35)	J. Smith (16)	J. Johnson (9)	Philips Arena; 12,977	9–2
12	November 18	Heat	W 105–90	J. Johnson (30)	J. Smith (14)	J. Smith (7)	Philips Arena; 18,729	10–2
13	November 20	Rockets	W 105–103	M. Williams (29)	M. Williams (9)	J. Johnson (9)	Philips Arena; 16,674	11–2
14	November 21	@ Hornets	L 88–96	J. Crawford (20)	A. Horford (11)	J. Smith (7)	New Orleans Arena; 15,933	11–3
15	November 26	Magic	L 76–93	J. Johnson (22)	J. Smith (13)	M. Bibby (5)	Philips Arena; 19,193	11–4
16	November 27	@ 76ers	W 100–86	J. Crawford (24)	M. Williams (9)	J. Crawford / M. Bibby (5)	Wachovia Center; 12,984	12–4
17	November 29	@ Pistons	L 88–94	J. Smith (23)	A. Horford (10)	M. Bibby (5)	The Palace of Auburn Hills; 15,273	12–5

December : 9–5 (home: 5–2; road: 4–3)

Game	Date	Team	Score	High points	High rebounds	High assists	Location Attendance	Record
18	December 2	Raptors	W 146–115	A. Horford (24)	Z. Pachulia (8)	J. Johnson (11)	Philips Arena; 12,272	13–5
19	December 4	Knicks	L 107–114	J. Johnson (29)	A. Horford (14)	J. Johnson (8)	Philips Arena; 17,165	13–6
20	December 5	@ Mavricks	W 80–75	J. Johnson (31)	M. Williams (15)	M. Bibby (6)	American Airlines Center; 19,550	14–6
21	December 9	Bulls	W 118–83	J. Crawford (29)	M. Williams (8)	J. Teague (8)	Philips Arena; 16,808	15–6
22	December 11	@ Raptors	W 111–89	J. Johnson (20)	J. Smith (8)	J. Teague (7)	Air Canada Centre; 17,032	16–6
23	December 13	Nets	W 130–107	M. Evans (22)	M. Evans (9); A. Horford (9)	J. Johnson (10)	Philips Arena; 14,015	17–6
24	December 16	Grizzlies	W 110–97	J. Johnson (26)	A. Horford (10)	J. Teague (6)	Philips Arena; 13,013	18–6
25	December 18	Jazz	W 96–83	J. Smith (16)	J. Johnson (9); A. Horford (9)	J. Johnson (7)	Philips Arena; 17,501	19–6
26	December 19	@ Bulls	L 98–101 OT	J. Johnson (40)	A. Horford (12)	J. Johnson (4); M. Bibby (4)	United Center; 21,381	19–7
27	December 22	@ Timberwolves	W 112–87	J. Crawford (26)	A. Horford (11)	J. Johnson (6); M. Bibby (6)	Target Center; 11,271	20–7
28	December 23	@ Nuggets	L 104–124	J. Crawford (24)	A. Horford (11)	J. Johnson (9)	Pepsi Center; 19,155	20–8
29	December 26	@ Pacers	W 110–98	A. Horford (25)	A. Horford (25)	M. Bibby (8)	Conseco Fieldhouse; 15,281	21–8
30	December 29	Cavaliers	L 84–95	J. Crawford (26)	A. Horford (9)	M. Bibby (7)	Philips Arena; 20,150	21–9
31	December 30	@ Cavaliers	L 101–106	J. Johnson (35)	A. Horford (7); M. Williams (7)	M. Bibby (6)	Quicken Loans Arena; 20,562	21–10

January : 9–6 (home: 6–2; road: 3–4)

Game	Date	Team	Score	High points	High rebounds	High assists	Location Attendance	Record
32	January 1	Knicks	L 108–112 OT	J. Johnson (35)	A. Horford (19)	M. Bibby (7)	Philips Arena; 17,366	21–11
33	January 4	@ Heat	L 75–92	J. Crawford (23)	J. Johnson (6); A. Horford (6); J. Smith (6)	J. Smith (5)	American Airlines Arena; 16,500	21–12
34	January 6	Nets	W 119–89	J. Crawford (29)	A. Horford (10)	J. Smith (7)	Philips Arena; 11,219	22–12
35	January 8	Celtics	W 93–85	J. Crawford (18)	J. Smith (11)	J. Johnson (8)	Philips Arena; 15,149	23–12
36	January 9	@ Magic	W 113–81	A Horford (14)	J. Smith (7)	J. Smith (3); J. Johnson (3)	Amway Arena; 17,461	23–13
37	January 11	@ Celtics	W 102–96	J. Johnson (36)	A. Horford (12)	J. Crawford (6)	TD Garden; 18,624	24–13
38	January 13	@ Wizards	W 94–82	J. Johnson (24)	J. Smith (11)	J. Smith (8)	Verizon Center; 9,695	25–13
39	January 15	Suns	W 102–101	A. Horford (24)	J. Smith (15)	M. Bibby (10)	Philips Arena; 17,605	26–13
40	January 18	Thunder	L 91–94	J. Johnson (23)	J. Smith (12)	J. Smith (7)	Philips Arena; 14,666	26–14
41	January 20	Kings	W 108–97	J. Crawford (20)	J. Smith (9)	J. Johnson (7)	Philips Arena; 14,809	27–14
42	January 22	Bobcats	W 103–89	J. Crawford (24)	A. Horford (9)	J. Johnson (7)	Philips Arena; 14,701	28–14
43	January 25	@ Rockets	W 102–95	J. Smith (22)	J. Smith (10); A. Horford (10)	J. Johnson (4)	Toyota Center; 14,998	29–14
44	January 27	@ Spurs	L 90–105	J. Johnson (31)	J. Smith (16)	J. Smith (7)	AT&T Center; 18,258	29–15
45	January 29	Celtics	W 100–91	J. Crawford (28)	J. Smith (9)	J. Crawford (6)	Philips Arena; 18,732	30–15
46	January 30	@ Magic	W 104–86				Amway Arena	30–16

February : 7–5 (home: 4–2; road: 3–3)

Game	Date	Team	Score	High points	High rebounds	High assists	Location Attendance	Record
47	February 2	@ Thunder	L 99–106	J. Johnson (37)	J. Smith (6); M. Williams (6)	M. Bibby (6)	Ford Center; 17,360	30–17
48	February 3	Clippers	W 103–97	J. Johnson (34)	A. Horford (10); J. Smith (10); M. Williams (10)	J. Smith (6)	Philips Arena; 13,303	31–17
49	February 5	Bulls	W 91–81	J. Johnson (18); J. Smith (18)	J. Smith (14)	J. Smith (10)	Philips Arena; 18,729	32-17
50	February 6	Wizards	Postponed				Philips Arena	
51	February 9	@ Grizzlies	W 108–94	J. Crawford (28)	A. Horford (8)	M. Bibby (6)	FedExForum; 10,491	33–17
52	February 10	Heat	L 76–94	J. Smith (18)	A. Horford (10)	M. Bibby (6)	Philips Arena; 17,074	33–18
53	February 17	@ Clippers	W 110–92	A Horford (31)	J. Smith (9)	J. Smith (7)	Staples Center; 15,485	34–18
54	February 19	@ Suns	L 80–88	J. Smith (21)	J. Johnson (9); A. Horford (9)	M. Bibby (4)	US Airways Center; 18,266	34–19
55	February 21	@ Warriors	L 104–108	J. Johnson (31)	J. Smith (17)	J. Smith (7)	Oracle Arena; 17,822	34–20
56	February 22	@ Jazz	W 105–100	J. Johnson (28)	J. Smith (9)	J. Johnson (6)	EnergySolutions Arena; 19,911	35–20
57	February 24	Timberwolves	W 98–92	J. Smith (27)	A. Horfold (13)	J. Johnson (5); A. Horford (5); J. Smith (5)	Philips Arena; 15,059	36–20
58	February 26	Mavericks	L 103–111 OT	J. Johnson (27)	J. Smith (11)	J. Johnson (10)	Philips Arena; 18,923	36–21
59	February 28	Bucks	W 106–102 OT	J. Johnson (24)	J. Smith (15)	J. Smith (6)	Philips Arena; 16,381	37–21

March : 11–5 (home: 8–0; road: 3–5)

Game	Date	Team	Score	High points	High rebounds	High assists	Location Attendance	Record
60	March 1	@ Bulls	W 116–92	J. Crawford (21)	J. Smith (18)	M. Williams (4); J. Smith (4); A. Horford (4)	United Center; 19,011	38–21
61	March 3	76ers	W 112–93	M. Williams (21)	M. Williams (8); A. Horford (8); J. Smith (8)	J. Johnson (5); J. Smith (5)	Philips Arena; 15,408	39–21
62	March 5	Warriors	W 127–122	J. Smith (29)	A. Horford (15)	J. Johnson (8)	Philips Arena; 14,066	40–21
63	March 6	@ Heat	L 94–100	J. Crawford (24)	A. Horford (9)	J. Smith (5)	American Airlines Arena; 19,600	40–22
64	March 8	@ Knicks	L 98–99	J. Smith (25)	A. Horford (12)	J. Smith (6)	Madison Square Garden; 19,763	40–23
50	March 11	@ Wizards	W 105–99	J. Crawford (29)	J. Johnson (7)	J. Johnson (5); J. Smith (5); M. Bibby (5)	Verizon Center; 13,625	41–23
65	March 13	Pistons	W 112–99	J. Crawford (29)	J. Johnson (7)	J. Johnson (5); J. Smith (5); M. Bibby (5)	Philips Arena; 18,214	42–23
66	March 16	@ Nets	W 108–84	J. Crawford (25)	A. Horford (11)	A. Horford (7)	Izod Center; 11,128	43–23
67	March 17	@ Raptors	L 105–106	J. Crawford (33)	A. Horford (14)	J. Smith (7)	Air Canada Centre; 18,441	43–24
68	March 19	Bobcats	W 93–92 OT	J. Johnson (18); J. Smith (18)	M. Williams (14)	J. Smith (5)	Philips Arena; 17,697	44–24
69	March 21	Spurs	W 119–114 OT	M. Williams (26)	A. Horford (18)	J. Johnson (13)	Philips Arena; 18,729	45–24
70	March 22	@ Bucks	L 95–98	J. Johnson (27)	A. Horford (12)	A. Horford (4)	Bradley Center; 14,186	45–25
71	March 24	Magic	W 86–84	J. Johnson (17)	A. Horford (11)	J. Johnson (8)	Philips Arena; 16,887	46–25
72	March 26	@ 76ers	L 98–105	J. Johnson (20); J. Smith (20)	A. Horford (10)	J. Johnson (6)	Wachovia Center; 13,293	46–26
73	March 28	Pacers	W 94–84	J. Smith (21)	J. Smith (13)	M. Bibby (8)	Philips Arena; 16,646	47–26
74	March 31	Lakers	W 109–92	J. Johnson (25)	Z. Pachulia (10)	J. Johnson (8)	Philips Arena; 20,190	48–26

April : 5–3 (home: 3–0; road: 2–3)

Game	Date	Team	Score	High points	High rebounds	High assists	Location Attendance	Record
75	April 2	@ Cavaliers	L 88–93	J. Smith (20)	A. Horford (8)	J. Johnson (5)	Quicken Loans Arena; 20,562	48–27
76	April 3	Pistons	W 91–85	J. Crawford (29)	A. Horford (14); J. Smith (14)	J. Crawford (6)	Philips Arena; 18,729	49–27
77	April 6	@ Bobcats	L 100–109	M. Evans (20)	A. Horford (12)	J. Teague (6); J. Crawford (6)	Time Warner Cable Arena; 18,610	49–28
78	April 7	@ Pistons	L 88–90	J. Crawford (19)	A. Horford (12)	A. Horford (6)	The Palace of Auburn Hills; 22,076	49–29
79	April 9	Raptors	W 107–101	J. Crawford (25)	A. Horford (15)	J. Johnson (7)	Philips Arena; 19,382	50–29
80	April 10	@ Wizards	W 105–95	J. Crawford (28)	A. Horford (10)	J. Smith (8)	Verizon Center; 20,173	51–29
81	April 12	@ Bucks	W 104–96	J. Johnson (31)	A. Horford (12)	Z. Pachulia (4)	Bradley Center; 14,186	52–29
82	April 14	Cavaliers	W 99–83	J. Teague (24)	J. Smith (10)	J. Teague (15)	Philips Arena; 19,069	53–29

2009–10 season schedule

== Playoffs ==
=== Game log ===
2010 playoff game log
Total: 4–7 (home: 3–3; road: 1–4)
First Round: 4–3 (home: 3–1; road: 1–2)

Game	Date	Team	Score	High points	High rebounds	High assists	Location Attendance	Series
1	April 17	Milwaukee	W 102–92	J. Johnson (22)	J. Smith (10)	J. Johnson (5)	Philips Arena; 18,729	1–0
2	April 20	Milwaukee	W 96–86	J. Johnson (27)	J. Smith (14)	J. Smith (9)	Philips Arena; 18,938	2–0
3	April 24	@ Milwaukee	L 89–107	J. Johnson (25)	J. Smith (12)	J. Crawford (4); J. Johnson (4)	Bradley Center; 18,717	2–1
4	April 26	@ Milwaukee	L 104–111	J. Johnson (29)	J. Smith (9)	J. Johnson (9)	Bradley Center; 18,717	2–2
5	April 28	Milwaukee	L 87–91	A. Horford (25)	A. Horford (25)	J. Johnson (6)	Philips Arena; 19,304	2–3
6	April 30	@ Milwaukee	W 83–69	J. Crawford (24)	A. Horford (15)	J. Johnson (6)	Bradley Center; 18,717	3–3
7	May 2	Milwaukee	W 95–74	J. Crawford (22)	A. Horford (15)	J. Crawford (6)	Philips Arena; 19,241	4–3

Conference Semifinals: 0–4 (home: 0–2; road: 0–2)

Game	Date	Team	Score	High points	High rebounds	High assists	Location Attendance	Series
1	May 4	@ Orlando	L 71–114	J. Smith (14)	J. Johnson (7); Z. Pachulia (7)	M. Bibby (3); J. Johnson (3)	Amway Arena; 17,461	0–1
2	May 6	@ Orlando	L 98–112	A. Horford (24)	M. Williams (11)	J. Johnson (5)	Amway Arena; 17,461	0–2
3	May 8	Orlando	L 75–105	J. Crawford (22)	J. Smith (11)	A. Horford (3)	Philips Arena; 18,729	0–3
4	May 10	Orlando	L 84–98	J. Crawford (18)	J.Smith (8)	J. Johnson (6)	Philips Arena; 18,729	0–4

2010 playoff schedule

== Player statistics ==
=== Season ===
Player	GP	GS	MPG	FG%	3P%	FT%	RPG	APG	SPG	BPG	PPG
Mike Bibby	80	80	27.4	.416	.389	.861	2.3	3.9	.8	.00	9.1
Jason Collins	24	0	4.8	.348	.000	.000	.6	.2	.1	.1	.7
Jamal Crawford	62	0	30.8	.446	.372	.853	2.6	2.9	.8	.2	17.3
Maurice Evans	79	5	16.7	.445	.337	.754	1.9	.6	.4	.2	5.7
Al Horford	81	81	35.1	.550	1.000	.789	9.9	2.3	.7	1.1	14.2
Joe Johnson	69	69	38.2	.455	.360	.827	4.7	4.8	1.1	.1	21.4
Randolph Morris	28	0	4.4	.561	.000	.593	1.4	.1	.2	.1	2.2
Zaza Pachulia	78	1	14.0	.488	.000	.650	3.8	.5	.5	.4	4.3
Joe Smith	64	1	9.3	.399	.143	.813	2.5	.3	.1	.3	3.0
Josh Smith	81	81	35.4	.505	.000	.618	8.7	4.2	2.8	2.1	15.7
Jeff Teague	71	3	10.1	.396	.219	.837	.9	1.7	.5	.2	3.2
Mario West	39	1	3.6	.571	.000	.600	.7	.2	.2	.000	.8
Marvin Williams	81	81	30.4	.455	.303	.819	5.1	1.1	.8	.6	10.1

=== Playoffs ===
Player	GP	GS	MPG	FG%	3P%	FT%	RPG	APG	SPG	BPG	PPG
Mike Bibby	11	11	26.5	.450	.412	.700	2.5	2.5	.8	.0	8.5
Jason Collins	3	0	3.3	.600	.000	.000	1.7	.0	.0	.0	2.0
Jamal Crawford	11	0	31.9	.364	.360	.845	2.7	2.7	.8	.1	16.3
Maurice Evans	11	0	13.5	.297	.300	.000	1.2	.2	.8	.0	2.3
Al Horford	11	11	35.3	.523	1.000	.839	9.0	1.8	.7	1.7	14.6
Joe Johnson	11	11	40.0	.387	.220	.810	5.1	5.0	.9	.3	17.9
Randolph Morris	3	0	3.3	.500	.000	1.000	.7	.0	.0	.0	1.0
Zaza Pachulia	11	0	14.6	.514	.000	.625	3.5	.3	.2	.6	4.6
Joe Smith	5	0	4.8	.000	.000	.000	.4	.0	.0	.2	.0
Josh Smith	11	11	35.6	.481	.333	.659	9.0	2.6	1.2	1.7	14.1
Jeff Teague	9	0	6.6	.333	.400	.000	.2	.4	.3	.1	1.8
Mario West	7	0	2.9	.750	.000	.000	.3	.1	.1	.0	.9
Marvin Williams	11	11	31.4	.392	.500	.906	5.7	.7	.6	.4	8.4

== Awards, records and milestones ==
=== Awards ===
==== Player of the Week ====
- November 2–November 8 – Joe Johnson

==== All-Star ====
- Joe Johnson was selected to his fourth consecutive All-Star Game.
- Al Horford was selected to his first All-Star Game.

== Transactions ==
Atlanta Hawks
Players Added

Via Draft

- Jeff Teague
- Sergiy Gladyr

Via Trade

- Jamal Crawford (From Warriors)

Via Free Agency

- Mike Bibby (From Re-signed)
- Zaza Pachulia (From Re-signed)
Players Lost

Via Trade

- Acie Law IV (To Warriors)
- Speedy Claxton (To Warriors)
- David Andersen (Rights to Rockets)

=== Trades ===
On June 25, 2009, the Hawks traded guards Acie Law IV and Speedy Claxton to the Warriors for guard Jamal Crawford.

=== Signs ===
On July 7, 2009, the Hawks re-signed veteran point guard Mike Bibby to a 3-year deal worth $18 million.

On July 8, 2009, the Hawks re-signed center Zaza Pachulia to a 4-year deal at $4.75 mil per year.

On August 14, 2009, the Hawks and unrestricted free agent forward Joe Smith agreed to terms on a 1-year contract at the veteran's minimum.
