= 2009–10 Toronto Raptors season =

NBA professional basketball team season

- Head coach: Jay Triano
- General manager: Bryan Colangelo
- Owners: Maple Leaf Sports & Entertainment
- Arena: Air Canada Centre

Results
- Record: 40–42 (.488)
- Place: Division: 2nd (Atlantic); Conference: 9th (Eastern)
- Playoff finish: Did not qualify
- Stats at Basketball Reference

Local media
- Television: Rogers Sportsnet; Raptors NBA TV; TSN; TSN2; The Score; CBLT-DT
- Radio: CJCL

The 2009–10 Toronto Raptors season was the 15th season of the Canadian franchise in the National Basketball Association (NBA). The Raptors were the busiest team in preseason transactions, replacing the previous season's entire roster with the exception of Chris Bosh, Andrea Bargnani, José Calderón, Patrick O'Bryant and Marcus Banks. Although the Raptors were chasing the fourth playoff seed at one point, they capitulated after the All-Star break, and eventually lost the eighth and final playoff spot to Chicago. Following the season, Bosh would sign as a free agent with the Miami Heat.

== Roster ==
2009–10 Toronto Raptors roster
Players

Pos.	No.	Player	Height	Weight	DOB	From
G	3	Marcus Banks	6 ft 2 in (1.88 m)	205 lb (93 kg)	1981-11-19	UNLV
F	7	Andrea Bargnani	7 ft 0 in (2.13 m)	250 lb (113 kg)	1985-10-26	Italy
G	0	Marco Belinelli	6 ft 5 in (1.96 m)	200 lb (91 kg)	1986-03-25	Italy
C	4	Chris Bosh	6 ft 11 in (2.11 m)	230 lb (104 kg)	1984-03-24	Georgia Tech
G	8	José Calderón	6 ft 3 in (1.91 m)	210 lb (95 kg)	1981-09-28	Spain
G	10	DeMar DeRozan	6 ft 7 in (2.01 m)	220 lb (100 kg)	1989-08-07	USC
F	14	Joey Dorsey	6 ft 9 in (2.06 m)	268 lb (122 kg)	1983-12-16	Memphis
F	30	Reggie Evans	6 ft 8 in (2.03 m)	245 lb (111 kg)	1980-05-18	Iowa
G	1	Jarrett Jack	6 ft 3 in (1.91 m)	197 lb (89 kg)	1983-10-28	Georgia Tech
F	15	Amir Johnson	6 ft 10 in (2.08 m)	228 lb (103 kg)	1987-05-01	Westchester HS (CA)
C	12	Rasho Nesterović	7 ft 0 in (2.13 m)	255 lb (116 kg)	1976-05-30	Slovenia
C	13	Patrick O'Bryant	7 ft 0 in (2.13 m)	250 lb (113 kg)	1986-06-20	Bradley
F	26	Hedo Türkoğlu	6 ft 10 in (2.08 m)	220 lb (100 kg)	1979-03-19	Turkey
G	24	Sonny Weems	6 ft 6 in (1.98 m)	203 lb (92 kg)	1986-07-08	Arkansas
F	21	Antoine Wright	6 ft 7 in (2.01 m)	215 lb (98 kg)	1984-02-06	Texas A&M

Coaches
Head coach
- Jay Triano
Assistant(s)
- Alex English
- Eric Hughes
- Marc Iavaroni
- Micah Nori
- Alvin Williams

Legend
- (DP) Unsigned draft pick
- (FA) Free agent
- (S) Suspended
- (DL) On assignment to D-League affiliate
- Injured

Roster
Updated: April 4, 2010

== Summary ==
=== Preseason ===
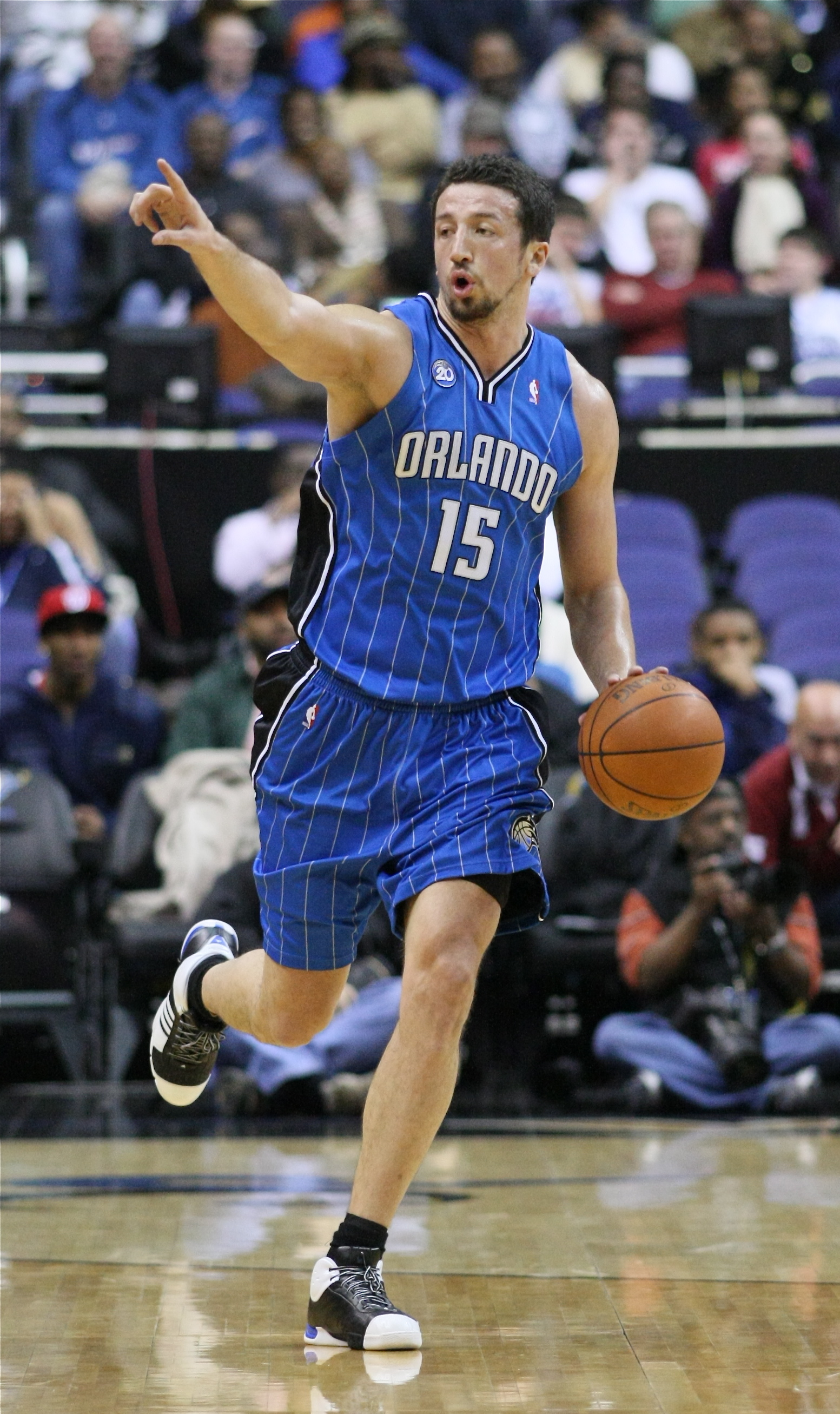
Türkoğlu was brought in for his playmaking and scoring abilities

The Raptors entered the 2009–10 NBA season in a state of flux: they had failed to qualify for the 2009 NBA Playoffs; it was Jay Triano's first full season in charge; and there was much uncertainty over the futures of perennial All-Star and captain Chris Bosh (who was into the final year of his contract), as well as Shawn Marion and Anthony Parker, both of whom could possibly become free agents before the season began. The roster shakeup began on 9 June 2009, when three-point specialist Jason Kapono ended his two-year tenure with the Raptors, and was traded to the Philadelphia 76ers for the aggressive veteran forward Reggie Evans. Toronto then drafted DeMar DeRozan with the ninth pick, enabling them to fill a spot on the wings. The other major roster change came in the form of signing free agent Hedo Türkoğlu; this led to a sign-and-trade agreement involving four teams, with Toronto landing Devean George (who was later traded for Marco Belinelli) and Antoine Wright, while trading Marion, Kris Humphries and Nathan Jawai. Around the same time, Parker signed with the Cleveland Cavaliers, while Indiana point guard Jarrett Jack was signed to back up José Calderón and former Raptor Radoslav Nesterović was brought back to the fold. Finally, Carlos Delfino and Roko Ukić were moved to the Milwaukee Bucks for Amir Johnson and Sonny Weems. It became increasingly clear that Colangelo, in securing a credible nucleus for the future, was doing this to persuade Bosh to stay.

=== Regular season ===
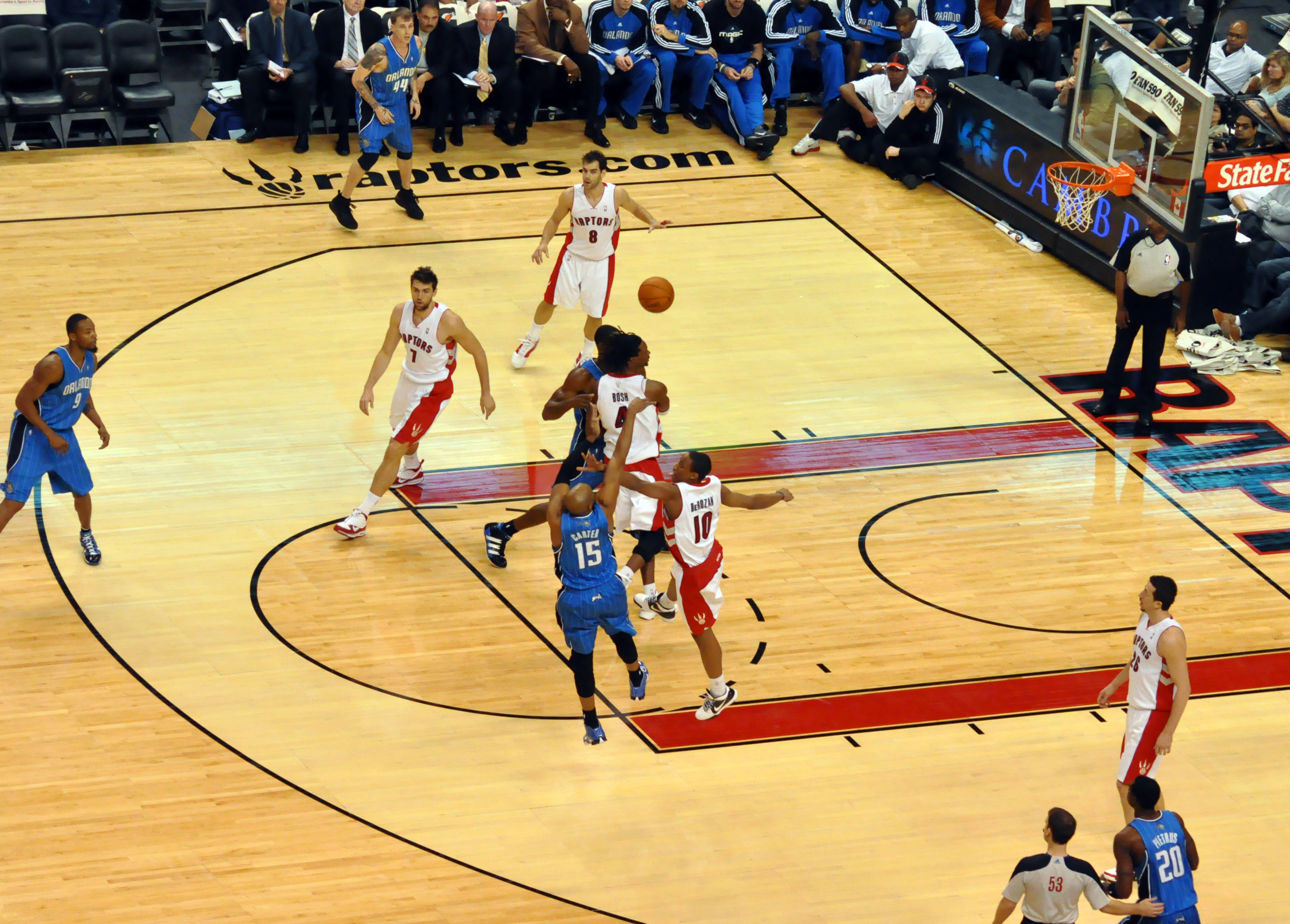
The starting line-up for most of the 2009–10 season: Bargnani (centre), Bosh (power forward), Türkoğlu (small forward), DeRozan (shooting guard) and Calderón (point guard)

The Raptors opened their season with a 101–91 home win over LeBron James' Cleveland Cavaliers. Bosh and Andrea Bargnani recorded impressive numbers—with Bosh leading the league in rebounds and free throw attempts, and also as one of the top scorers—but the Raptors were slow off the blocks, going 7–8 in their first 15 games. In that period, although the Raptors was fourth in the league in number of points scored per game, they were second last in the league in number of points allowed per game as well. Newcomer Wright criticised the team for being unfocused in pre-game preparations, and appealed to team captain Bosh to change that. The Raptors persisted in being one of the worst defensive teams in the league, and their descent culminated in a 146–115 drubbing by the Atlanta Hawks—the second worst defeat in franchise history—bringing their record to 7–13. They were soon ranked last in most points allowed per 100 possessions, earning a defensive rating that was 10.8% worse than the second-last team, which was the largest disparity in NBA history. The team held a meeting to clear up communication issues among teammates, and this was followed by three consecutive wins.

Türkoğlu was having difficulty adapting to his new team, while injuries were also an issue for the Raptors: Evans had yet to feature with more than a third of the season gone, while Calderón missed a dozen after 20 games into the season. This, however, allowed front court role players like Johnson and Weems to pick up more minutes, and Jack to start at the point. Toronto compiled a 5-game winning streak—its best in years—to climb back into the playoff race, and found themselves 16–17 to round off the year after a bad start to December, and .500 after 36 games. They were able to maintain this record for the next few games, beating premier teams such as the San Antonio Spurs, Orlando Magic, Dallas Mavericks and Los Angeles Lakers along the way, while Bosh continued leading the league in double doubles and was only one of three players to average at least 20 points and 10 rebounds a game. By the time the All-Star break arrived, the team had a 29–23 record, going 18–6 after the emergency team meeting in mid-December, which was the second best in the league after Cleveland.

After hitting a season-high of six games above .500, Toronto's run of good form came to a halt after the All-Star break, due in large part to an injury to Bosh which occurred in a Feb. 17 OT loss to Memphis. The team struggled and went under .500 on 14 March 2010, going 32–33. Their form in March continued to be patchy, and their drop in the conference rankings resulted in a close jostle with the Chicago Bulls for the eighth and final playoffs spot. Triano also adjusted the starting lineup, moving Türkoğlu and DeRozan to the bench and Wright and Weems in the opposite direction. As the Bulls closed in on the Raptors, Bosh and Türkoğlu suffered injuries, with the former being ruled out of the regular season five games before it ended. When Chicago subsequently routed Toronto, the eighth spot remained up for grabs until the final day of the regular season: if Toronto beat New York and Chicago lost to Charlotte, Toronto would prevail as they led the head-to-head 2–1; however, while the Raptors defeated the Knicks, the Bulls won against the Bobcats and Chicago took the final spot, with a record of 41–41, one win above Toronto.

== Standings ==
Atlantic Division	W	L	PCT	GB	Home	Road	Div
y-Boston Celtics	50	32	.610	–	24–17	26–15	13–3
Toronto Raptors	40	42	.488	10	25–16	15–26	11–5
New York Knicks	29	53	.354	21	18–23	11–30	6–10
Philadelphia 76ers	27	55	.329	23	12–29	15–26	7–9
New Jersey Nets	12	70	.146	38	8–33	4–37	3–13

#	Eastern Conference				
#	Team	W	L	PCT	GB
1	z-Cleveland Cavaliers	61	21	.744	–
2	y-Orlando Magic	59	23	.720	2
3	x-Atlanta Hawks	53	29	.646	8
4	y-Boston Celtics	50	32	.610	11
5	x-Miami Heat	47	35	.573	14
6	x-Milwaukee Bucks	46	36	.561	15
7	x-Charlotte Bobcats	44	38	.537	17
8	x-Chicago Bulls	41	41	.500	20
9	Toronto Raptors	40	42	.488	21
10	Indiana Pacers	32	50	.390	29
11	New York Knicks	29	53	.354	32
12	Philadelphia 76ers	27	55	.329	34
13	Detroit Pistons	27	55	.329	34
14	Washington Wizards	26	56	.317	35
15	New Jersey Nets	12	70	.146	49

== Game log ==
=== Regular season ===
2009–10 game log
Total: 40–42 (Home: 25–16; Road: 15–26)
October: 1–1 (home: 1–0; road: 0–1)

Game	Date	Team	Score	High points	High rebounds	High assists	Location Attendance	Record
1	October 28	Cleveland	W 101–91	Andrea Bargnani (28)	Chris Bosh (16)	José Calderón (11)	Air Canada Centre; 20,152	1–0
2	October 30	@ Memphis	L 107–115	Chris Bosh (37)	Chris Bosh (12)	Jarrett Jack (5)	FedExForum; 10,563	1–1

November: 6–10 (home: 4–3; road: 2–7)

Game	Date	Team	Score	High points	High rebounds	High assists	Location Attendance	Record
3	November 1	Orlando	L 116–125	Chris Bosh (35)	Chris Bosh (16)	José Calderón (6)	Air Canada Centre; 18,147	1–2
4	November 4	Detroit	W 110–99	Chris Bosh (25)	Andrea Bargnani (12)	Jarrett Jack, Hedo Türkoğlu (6)	Air Canada Centre; 17,915	2–2
5	November 6	@ New Orleans	W 107–90	Chris Bosh (27)	Andrea Bargnani (9)	José Calderón (8)	New Orleans Arena; 15,010	3–2
6	November 7	@ Dallas	L 101–129	Chris Bosh (26)	Chris Bosh (12)	José Calderón (7)	American Airlines Center; 19,977	3–3
7	November 9	@ San Antonio	L 124–131	Chris Bosh (32)	Chris Bosh (10)	José Calderón (9)	AT&T Center; 17,714	3–4
8	November 11	Chicago	W 99–89	Chris Bosh (28)	Chris Bosh (11)	José Calderón (6)	Air Canada Centre; 16,310	4–4
9	November 13	@ L.A. Clippers	W 104–89	Chris Bosh (21)	Chris Bosh (14)	José Calderón (9)	Staples Center; 15,615	5–4
10	November 15	@ Phoenix	L 100–101	Chris Bosh (25)	Chris Bosh (10)	José Calderón (7)	US Airways Center; 16,605	5–5
11	November 17	@ Denver	L 112–130	DeMar DeRozan (17)	Chris Bosh (14)	José Calderón (7)	Pepsi Center; 16,446	5–6
12	November 18	@ Utah	L 91–104	Chris Bosh (32)	Chris Bosh (17)	Jarrett Jack (5)	EnergySolutions Arena; 17,789	5–7
13	November 20	Miami	W 120–113	Chris Bosh (29)	Chris Bosh (12)	José Calderón (10)	Air Canada Centre; 19,800	6–7
14	November 22	Orlando	L 96–104	Chris Bosh (22)	Andrea Bargnani (9)	Jarrett Jack (11)	Air Canada Centre; 17,233	6–8
15	November 24	Indiana	W 123–112	José Calderón (21)	Chris Bosh (12)	José Calderón, Hedo Türkoğlu (7)	Air Canada Centre; 17,136	7–8
16	November 25	@ Charlotte	L 81–116	Chris Bosh (18)	Chris Bosh (14)	José Calderón (8)	Time Warner Cable Arena; 13,689	7–9
17	November 27	@ Boston	L 103–116	Chris Bosh, Hedo Türkoğlu (20)	Chris Bosh (13)	Jarrett Jack (5)	TD Garden; 18,624	7–10
18	November 29	Phoenix	L 94–113	Chris Bosh (30)	Chris Bosh (17)	José Calderón (7)	Air Canada Centre; 17,721	7–11

December: 9–6 (home: 6–2; road: 3–4)

Game	Date	Team	Score	High points	High rebounds	High assists	Location Attendance	Record
19	December 1	Washington	L 102–106	Chris Bosh (22)	Chris Bosh (14)	Hedo Türkoğlu (6)	Air Canada Centre; 15,776	7–12
20	December 2	@ Atlanta	L 115–146	DeMar DeRozan (21)	Amir Johnson (7)	Jarrett Jack (8)	Philips Arena; 12,272	7–13
21	December 4	@ Washington	W 109–107 (OT)	Chris Bosh (31)	Chris Bosh (16)	José Calderón (9)	Verizon Center; 20,173	8–13
22	December 5	@ Chicago	W 110–78	Chris Bosh (25)	Chris Bosh (12)	Jarrett Jack (9)	United Center; 20,481	9–13
23	December 8	Minnesota	W 94–88	Chris Bosh (21)	Chris Bosh (16)	Jarrett Jack (8)	Air Canada Centre; 15,167	10–13
24	December 9	@ Milwaukee	L 95–117	Chris Bosh (26)	Chris Bosh (10)	Jarrett Jack (7)	Air Canada Centre; 12,637	10–14
25	December 11	Atlanta	L 89–111	Andrea Bargnani (17)	Chris Bosh (10)	Hedo Türkoğlu (8)	Air Canada Centre; 17,032	10–15
26	December 13	Houston	W 101–88	Chris Bosh (27)	Jarrett Jack (8)	Jarrett Jack (8)	Air Canada Centre; 17,111	11–15
27	December 15	@ Miami	L 95–115	Chris Bosh (28)	Andrea Bargnani, DeMar DeRozan (7)	Chris Bosh, Hedo Türkoğlu (4)	American Airlines Arena; 15,106	11–16
28	December 16	@ Orlando	L 99–118	Chris Bosh (20)	Chris Bosh (6)	Jarrett Jack (5)	Amway Arena; 17,461	11–17
29	December 18	New Jersey	W 118–95	Amir Johnson (18)	Chris Bosh (8)	Jarrett Jack (9)	Air Canada Centre; 15,901	12–17
30	December 20	New Orleans	W 98–92	Chris Bosh (25)	Amir Johnson (12)	Jarrett Jack, Hedo Türkoğlu (7)	Air Canada Centre; 15,790	13–17
31	December 23	@ Detroit	W 94–64	Andrea Bargnani (21)	Chris Bosh (9)	Hedo Türkoğlu (11)	The Palace of Auburn Hills; 19,396	14–17
32	December 27	Detroit	W 102–95	Chris Bosh (25)	Chris Bosh (16)	Hedo Türkoğlu (6)	Air Canada Centre; 19,800	15–17
33	December 30	Charlotte	W 107–103	Chris Bosh (33)	Chris Bosh (13)	Jarrett Jack (6)	Air Canada Centre; 18,979	16–17

January: 10–5 (home: 6–1; road: 4–4)

Game	Date	Team	Score	High points	High rebounds	High assists	Location Attendance	Record
34	January 2	@ Boston	L 96–103	Chris Bosh (25)	Chris Bosh (9)	Jarrett Jack, Hedo Türkoğlu (7)	TD Garden; 18,624	16–18
35	January 3	San Antonio	W 91–86	Chris Bosh (22)	Chris Bosh (15)	Jarrett Jack (8)	Air Canada Centre; 18,323	17–18
36	January 6	@ Orlando	W 108–103	Andrea Bargnani, Chris Bosh (18)	Chris Bosh (12)	José Calderón (8)	Amway Arena; 17,461	18–18
37	January 8	@ Philadelphia	W 108–106	Chris Bosh (29)	Chris Bosh (9)	Chris Bosh (6)	Wachovia Center; 15,264	19–18
38	January 10	Boston	L 107–114	Chris Bosh (31)	Chris Bosh (13)	Hedo Türkoğlu (9)	Air Canada Centre; 19,800	19–19
39	January 11	@ Indiana	L 101–105	Chris Bosh (27)	Andrea Bargnani (17)	José Calderón (6)	Conseco Fieldhouse; 11,039	19–20
40	January 15	@ New York	W 112–104	Andrea Bargnani (24)	Andrea Bargnani (12)	José Calderón (6)	Madison Square Garden; 19,763	20–20
41	January 17	Dallas	W 110–88	Chris Bosh (23)	Chris Bosh (13)	José Calderón, Jarrett Jack (7)	Air Canada Centre; 19,004	21–20
42	January 19	@ Cleveland	L 100–108	Chris Bosh (21)	Chris Bosh (10)	José Calderón (6)	Quicken Loans Arena; 20,562	21–21
43	January 20	@ Milwaukee	L 107–113	Chris Bosh (44)	Chris Bosh (12)	José Calderón, Jarrett Jack (5)	Bradley Center; 12,724	21–22
44	January 22	Milwaukee	W 101–96	Jarrett Jack (27)	Antoine Wright (8)	Hedo Türkoğlu (5)	Air Canada Centre; 17,819	22–22
45	January 24	L.A. Lakers	W 106–105	Andrea Bargnani (22)	Chris Bosh (13)	José Calderón, Hedo Türkoğlu (5)	Air Canada Centre; 20,111	23–22
46	January 27	Miami	W 111–103	Andrea Bargnani (27)	Chris Bosh (18)	José Calderón (7)	Air Canada Centre; 18,265	24–22
47	January 28	@ New York	W 106–104	Chris Bosh (27)	Chris Bosh (15)	José Calderón (7)	Madison Square Garden; 18,828	25–22
48	January 31	Indiana	W 117–102	Chris Bosh (26)	Chris Bosh (15)	Chris Bosh, José Calderón (7)	Air Canada Centre; 16,715	26–22

February: 5–5 (home: 4–3; road: 1–2)

Game	Date	Team	Score	High points	High rebounds	High assists	Location Attendance	Record
49	February 2	@ Indiana	L 115–130	Chris Bosh (35)	Chris Bosh (15)	José Calderón (8)	Conseco Fieldhouse; 11,191	26–23
50	February 3	New Jersey	W 108–99	Andrea Bargnani, Chris Bosh (20)	Sonny Weems (11)	Jarrett Jack (9)	Air Canada Centre; 15,222	27–23
51	February 7	Sacramento	W 115–104	Chris Bosh (35)	Chris Bosh (11)	Jarrett Jack (9)	Air Canada Centre; 18,007	28–23
52	February 10	Philadelphia	W 104–93	Chris Bosh (23)	Chris Bosh (12)	Jarrett Jack (8)	Air Canada Centre; 16,651	29–23
53	February 17	Memphis	L 102–109 (OT)	Chris Bosh (32)	Andrea Bargnani, Chris Bosh (10)	José Calderón (9)	Air Canada Centre; 16,829	29–24
54	February 19	@ New Jersey	W 106–89	Jarrett Jack (18)	Radoslav Nesterović (7)	Jarrett Jack (10)	Izod Center; 11,994	30–24
55	February 20	Washington	W 109–104	Jarrett Jack (23)	Reggie Evans (7)	Jarrett Jack (8)	Air Canada Centre; 19,149	31–24
56	February 24	Portland	L 87–101	Hedo Türkoğlu (24)	Reggie Evans, Amir Johnson (8)	Jarrett Jack (8)	Air Canada Centre; 16,161	31–25
57	February 26	Cleveland	L 118–126 (OT)	Andrea Bargnani, Jarrett Jack (24)	DeMar DeRozan, Reggie Evans (5)	José Calderón (8)	Air Canada Centre; 20,107	31–26
58	February 28	@ Oklahoma City	L 99–119	Andrea Bargnani, Sonny Weems (14)	Amir Johnson (11)	José Calderón (7)	Ford Center; 18,203	31–27

March: 6–10 (home: 3–4; road: 3–6)

Game	Date	Team	Score	High points	High rebounds	High assists	Location Attendance	Record
59	March 1	@ Houston	L 92–116	Marcus Banks (15)	Radoslav Nesterović (7)	Jarrett Jack (6)	Toyota Center; 13,943	31–28
60	March 5	New York	W 102–96	Sonny Weems (20)	Hedo Türkoğlu, Sonny Weems (9)	José Calderón (6)	Air Canada Centre; 18,889	32–28
61	March 7	Philadelphia	L 101–114	Jarrett Jack (20)	Chris Bosh (12)	Jarrett Jack (9)	Air Canada Centre; 18,736	32–29
62	March 9	@ L.A. Lakers	L 107–109	Chris Bosh (22)	Andrea Bargnani (8)	Jarrett Jack (7)	Staples Center; 18,997	32–30
63	March 10	@ Sacramento	L 90–113	Andrea Bargnani (20)	Hedo Türkoğlu (7)	Chris Bosh, Jarrett Jack, Hedo Türkoğlu (3)	ARCO Arena; 13,412	32–31
64	March 13	@ Golden State	L 112–124	Chris Bosh, José Calderón (24)	Chris Bosh (11)	José Calderón (12)	Oracle Arena; 17,655	32–32
65	March 14	@ Portland	L 98–109	Chris Bosh (28)	Chris Bosh (7)	José Calderón (7)	Rose Garden Arena; 20,639	32–33
66	March 17	Atlanta	W 106–105	Andrea Bargnani (22)	Andrea Bargnani (11)	José Calderón (6)	Air Canada Centre; 18,441	33–33
67	March 19	Oklahoma City	L 89–115	Chris Bosh (22)	Chris Bosh (10)	Jarrett Jack (7)	Air Canada Centre; 19,351	33–34
68	March 20	@ New Jersey	W 100–90	Chris Bosh (36)	Chris Bosh, Jarrett Jack (8)	José Calderón (8)	Izod Center; 11,048	34–34
69	March 22	@ Minnesota	W 106–100	Chris Bosh (21)	Chris Bosh (10)	Jarrett Jack (8)	Target Center; 14,554	35–34
70	March 24	Utah	L 87–113	Chris Bosh (20)	Reggie Evans (9)	Chris Bosh, José Calderón (3)	Air Canada Centre; 16,178	35–35
71	March 26	Denver	L 96–97	Chris Bosh (18)	Andrea Bargnani (15)	Chris Bosh, José Calderón (6)	Air Canada Centre; 19,800	35–36
72	March 28	@ Miami	L 94–97	Chris Bosh (19)	Chris Bosh (6)	José Calderón (7)	American Airlines Arena; 19,600	35–37
73	March 29	@ Charlotte	W 103–101	Chris Bosh (22)	Chris Bosh (11)	José Calderón (7)	Time Warner Cable Arena; 14,534	36–37
74	March 31	L.A. Clippers	W 114–92	Chris Bosh (34)	Chris Bosh (11)	Jarrett Jack (10)	Air Canada Centre; 16,106	37–37

April: 3–5 (home: 1–3; road: 2–2)

Game	Date	Team	Score	High points	High rebounds	High assists	Location Attendance	Record
75	April 3	@ Philadelphia	W 128–123 (OT)	Chris Bosh (28)	Chris Bosh (12)	José Calderón (10)	Wachovia Center; 13,430	38–37
76	April 4	Golden State	L 112–113	Chris Bosh (42)	Chris Bosh (12)	Jarrett Jack (4)	Air Canada Centre; 17,509	38–38
77	April 6	@ Cleveland	L 101–113	Jarrett Jack (23)	Amir Johnson (10)	Jarrett Jack (6)	Quicken Loans Arena; 20,562	38–39
78	April 7	Boston	L 104–115	Sonny Weems (21)	Antoine Wright (7)	José Calderón (9)	Air Canada Centre; 18,793	38–40
79	April 9	@ Atlanta	L 101–107	Amir Johnson, Sonny Weems (18)	Amir Johnson (13)	José Calderón (10)	Philips Arena; 19,382	38–41
80	April 11	Chicago	L 88–104	Andrea Bargnani, Sonny Weems (18)	Hedo Türkoğlu (19)	Hedo Türkoğlu (9)	Air Canada Centre; 19,515	38–42
81	April 12	@ Detroit	W 111–97	Andrea Bargnani (33)	Hedo Türkoğlu (8)	Jarrett Jack (12)	The Palace of Auburn Hills; 22,076	39–42
82	April 14	New York	W 131–113	Andrea Bargnani, DeMar DeRozan (24)	DeMar DeRozan (9)	Jarrett Jack (6)	Air Canada Centre; 18,333	40–42

2009–10 season schedule

== Player statistics ==
=== Regular season ===
Player	POS	GP	GS	MP	REB	AST	STL	BLK	PTS	MPG	RPG	APG	SPG	BPG	PPG
Jarrett Jack	PG	82	43	2,243	222	413	60	6	931	27.4	2.7	5.0	.7	.1	11.4
Amir Johnson	PF	82	5	1,453	395	48	44	66	511	17.7	4.8	.6	.5	.8	6.2
Andrea Bargnani	PF	80	80	2,799	493	93	25	111	1,376	35.0	6.2	1.2	.3	1.4	17.2
DeMar DeRozan	SG	77	65	1,664	223	53	43	18	662	21.6	2.9	.7	.6	.2	8.6
Hedo Türkoğlu	SF	74	69	2,272	343	304	55	32	835	30.7	4.6	4.1	.7	.4	11.3
Chris Bosh	C	70	70	2,526	759	166	43	68	1,678	36.1	10.8	2.4	.6	1.0	24.0
Sonny Weems	SG	69	19	1,368	192	101	39	25	518	19.8	2.8	1.5	.6	.4	7.5
José Calderón	PG	68	39	1,817	142	404	47	7	699	26.7	2.1	5.9	.7	.1	10.3
Antoine Wright	SF	67	10	1,392	190	71	30	11	435	20.8	2.8	1.1	.4	.2	6.5
Marco Belinelli	SG	66	1	1,121	95	89	42	5	469	17.0	1.4	1.3	.6	.1	7.1
Rasho Nesterović	C	42	8	413	89	25	10	17	163	9.8	2.1	.6	.2	.4	3.9
Reggie Evans	PF	28	1	311	105	8	14	4	95	11.1	3.8	.3	.5	.1	3.4
Marcus Banks	PG	22	0	244	23	26	12	2	109	11.1	1.0	1.2	.5	.1	5.0
Pops Mensah-Bonsu^{†}	PF	16	0	107	31	2	3	8	34	6.7	1.9	.1	.2	.5	2.1
Patrick O'Bryant	C	11	0	51	11	1	2	4	19	4.6	1.0	.1	.2	.4	1.7

- ^{†} Denotes player spent time with another team in the season. Stats reflect time with the Raptors only.

== Transactions ==
=== Trades ===
July 9, 2009	To Toronto Raptors Hedo Türkoğlu (From Orlando) (via sign and trade); Devean George (From Dallas); Antoine Wright (From Dallas) To Orlando Magic Cash (from Dallas); Cash (Toronto)	To Memphis Grizzlies Jerry Stackhouse (from Dallas); Second-round pick (from Toronto); Cash (from Toronto) To Dallas Mavericks Shawn Marion (from Toronto) (via sign and trade); Kris Humphries (from Toronto); Nathan Jawai (From Toronto); Greg Buckner (From Memphis)

=== Free agents ===
Additions
Player	Date signed	Former team
Jarrett Jack	July 21	Indiana Pacers
Radoslav Nesterović	July 30	Indiana Pacers
Pops Mensah-Bonsu	November 16	Houston Rockets

Subtractions
Player	Date signed	New Team
Pops Mensah-Bonsu	September 3	Houston Rockets
Quincy Douby	November 17	Darüşşafaka Cooper Tires
