= 2009–10 Miami Heat season =

NBA professional basketball team season

- Head coach: Erik Spoelstra
- President: Pat Riley
- Owner: Micky Arison
- Arena: American Airlines Arena

Results
- Record: 47–35 (.573)
- Place: Division: 3rd (Southeast); Conference: 5th (Eastern)
- Playoff finish: First Round (lost to Celtics 1–4)
- Stats at Basketball Reference

Local media
- Television: Fox Sports Florida, Sun Sports
- Radio: WIOD

The 2009–10 Miami Heat season was the 22nd season of the franchise in the National Basketball Association (NBA). The Heat made the playoffs for the second straight year under Erik Spoelstra. They failed to make it out of the first round once again as they were overpowered by a Boston Celtics squad that featured Kevin Garnett, Paul Pierce, and Ray Allen in five games. Boston eventually lost in seven games to the Los Angeles Lakers in the NBA Finals. Following the season, the Heat would acquire LeBron James and Chris Bosh to join Dwyane Wade and create a Big Three that lasted until 2014.

== Key dates ==
- June 25 – The 2009 NBA draft took place in New York City.
- July 8 – The free agency period started.
- October 5 – The Heat played their first preseason game on the road against the Detroit Pistons at the Palace of Auburn Hills.
- October 27 – The Heat's regular season began with a home game versus the New York Knicks.
- April 17 – The Heat began the first round of the playoffs against the Boston Celtics at TD Garden.

== Offseason ==
=== 2009 NBA draft ===
Round	Pick	Player	Position	Nationality	School/Club team
2	42	Patrick Beverley	Guard	United States	Arkansas
2	60	Robert Dozier	Forward	United States	Memphis

=== Transactions ===
Miami Heat

Players Added

Via Draft
Via Free Agency

- Carlos Arroyo
- Shavlik Randolph

Via Trade

- Quentin Richardson (From Timberwolves)
Players Lost

Via Free Agency

- Jamario Moon (To Cavaliers)

Via Trade

- Mark Blount (To Timberwolves)

Waived

== Roster ==
2009–10 Miami Heat roster
Players

Pos.	No.	Player	Height	Weight	DOB	From
PG	11	Rafer Alston (S)	6 ft 2 in (1.88 m)	175 lb (79 kg)	1976-07-24	Fresno State
C	50	Joel Anthony	6 ft 9 in (2.06 m)	245 lb (111 kg)	1982-08-09	UNLV
G	8	Carlos Arroyo	6 ft 2 in (1.88 m)	202 lb (92 kg)	1979-07-30	FIU
F	30	Michael Beasley	6 ft 9 in (2.06 m)	235 lb (107 kg)	1989-01-09	Kansas State
PG	6	Mario Chalmers	6 ft 1 in (1.85 m)	190 lb (86 kg)	1986-05-19	Kansas
SG	14	Daequan Cook	6 ft 0 in (1.83 m)	210 lb (95 kg)	1987-04-28	Ohio State
G/F	9	Yakhouba Diawara	6 ft 7 in (2.01 m)	225 lb (102 kg)	1982-08-29	Pepperdine
F	40	Udonis Haslem	6 ft 8 in (2.03 m)	235 lb (107 kg)	1980-06-09	Florida
F	22	James Jones	6 ft 8 in (2.03 m)	220 lb (100 kg)	1980-10-04	Miami (FL)
C	21	Jamaal Magloire	6 ft 11 in (2.11 m)	255 lb (116 kg)	1978-05-21	Kentucky
F/C	7	Jermaine O'Neal	6 ft 11 in (2.11 m)	255 lb (116 kg)	1978-10-13	Eau Claire HS (SC)
F	42	Shavlik Randolph	6 ft 10 in (2.08 m)	240 lb (109 kg)	1983-11-24	Duke
G/F	5	Quentin Richardson	6 ft 6 in (1.98 m)	228 lb (103 kg)	1980-04-13	DePaul
SG	3	Dwyane Wade	6 ft 4 in (1.93 m)	220 lb (100 kg)	1982-01-17	Marquette

Coaches
Head coach
- Erik Spoelstra
Assistant(s)
- Keith Askins
- David Fizdale
- Bill Foran
- Chet Kammerer
- Bob McAdoo
- Ron Rothstein

Legend
- (DP) Unsigned draft pick
- (FA) Free agent
- (S) Suspended
- Injured

Roster
Updated: April 6, 2010

== Pre-season ==
2009 Pre-season game log: 2–5–0 (home: 2–2–0; road: 0–3–0)
#	Date	Visitor	Score	Home	OT	Decision	Venue	Record	Recap
1	October 5	Miami Heat	83–87	Detroit Pistons		Loss	The Palace of Auburn Hills	0–1
2	October 7	Miami Heat	86–90	Orlando Magic		Loss	Amway Arena	0–2
3	October 11	San Antonio Spurs	95–93	Miami Heat		Loss	American Airlines Arena	0–3
4	October 14	Miami Heat	91–96	Oklahoma City Thunder		Loss	BOK Center (Tulsa, Oklahoma)	0–4
5	October 15	New Orleans Hornets	81–97	Miami Heat		Win	Sprint Center (Kansas City, Missouri)	1–4
6	October 21	Memphis Grizzlies	93–99	Miami Heat		Win	American Airlines Arena	2–4
7	October 22	Atlanta Hawks	92–87	Miami Heat		Loss	Veterans Memorial Arena (Jacksonville, Florida)	2–5

== Regular season ==
=== Standings ===
Southeast Division	W	L	PCT	GB	Home	Road	Div
y-Orlando Magic	59	23	.720	–	34–7	25–16	10–6
x-Atlanta Hawks	53	29	.646	6	34–7	19–22	8–8
x-Miami Heat	47	35	.573	12	24–17	23–18	9–7
x-Charlotte Bobcats	44	38	.537	15	31–10	13–28	10–6
Washington Wizards	26	56	.317	33	15–26	11–30	3–13

#	Eastern Conference				
#	Team	W	L	PCT	GB
1	z-Cleveland Cavaliers	61	21	.744	–
2	y-Orlando Magic	59	23	.720	2
3	x-Atlanta Hawks	53	29	.646	8
4	y-Boston Celtics	50	32	.610	11
5	x-Miami Heat	47	35	.573	14
6	x-Milwaukee Bucks	46	36	.561	15
7	x-Charlotte Bobcats	44	38	.537	17
8	x-Chicago Bulls	41	41	.500	20
9	Toronto Raptors	40	42	.488	21
10	Indiana Pacers	32	50	.390	29
11	New York Knicks	29	53	.354	32
12	Philadelphia 76ers	27	55	.329	34
13	Detroit Pistons	27	55	.329	34
14	Washington Wizards	26	56	.317	35
15	New Jersey Nets	12	70	.146	49

=== Game log ===
2009–10 game log
Total: 47–35 (home: 24–17; road: 23–18)
October: 2–0 (home: 1–0; road: 1–0)

Game	Date	Team	Score	High points	High rebounds	High assists	Location Attendance	Record
1	October 28	New York	W 115–93	Dwyane Wade (26)	Jermaine O'Neal (12)	Dwyane Wade (5)	American Airlines Arena; 19,600	1–0
2	October 30	@ Indiana	W 96–83	Dwyane Wade (32)	Jermaine O'Neal (12)	Mario Chalmers (6)	Conseco Fieldhouse; 18,165	2–0

November: 7–7 (home: 5–5; road: 2–2)

Game	Date	Team	Score	High points	High rebounds	High assists	Location Attendance	Record
3	November 1	Chicago	W 95–87	Dwyane Wade (25) (reaches 10,000 career points)	Michael Beasley, Udonis Haslem (11)	Mario Chalmers (4)	American Airlines Arena; 15,865	3–0
4	November 3	Phoenix	L 96–104	Dwyane Wade (23)	Udonis Haslem (13)	Dwyane Wade (7)	American Airlines Arena; 15,105	3–1
5	November 4	@ Washington	W 93–89	Dwyane Wade (40)	Quentin Richardson (9)	Mario Chalmers (8)	Verizon Center; 17,413	4–1
6	November 6	Denver	W 96–88	Dwyane Wade (22)	Udonis Haslem (10)	Dwyane Wade (5)	American Airlines Arena; 19,600	5–1
7	November 10	Washington	W 90–76	Dwyane Wade (41)	Jermaine O'Neal (6)	Mario Chalmers, Dwyane Wade (5)	American Airlines Arena; 15,154	6–1
8	November 12	Cleveland	L 104–111	Dwyane Wade (36)	Jermaine O'Neal (9)	Mario Chalmers (6)	American Airlines Arena; 19,600	6–2
9	November 14	New Jersey	W 81–80	Udonis Haslem (28)	Udonis Haslem (12)	Dwyane Wade (6)	American Airlines Arena; 17,124	7–2
10	November 17	Oklahoma City	L 87–100	Dwyane Wade (22)	Jermaine O'Neal (10)	Dwyane Wade (7)	American Airlines Arena; 14,443	7–3
11	November 18	@ Atlanta	L 90–105	Michael Beasley (21)	Michael Beasley (8)	Dwyane Wade (4)	Philips Arena; 18,729	7–4
12	November 20	@ Toronto	L 113–120	Mario Chalmers, Dwyane Wade (30)	Michael Beasley (12)	Dwyane Wade (8)	Air Canada Centre; 19,800	7–5
13	November 22	New Orleans	W 102–101	Dwyane Wade (31)	Michael Beasley (9)	Mario Chalmers (9)	American Airlines Arena; 16,500	8–5
14	November 25	@ Orlando	W 99–98	Dwyane Wade (24)	Jermaine O'Neal (16)	Dwyane Wade (6)	Amway Arena; 17,461	9–5
15	November 27	Washington	L 84–94	Mario Chalmers (20)	Jermaine O'Neal (13)	Dwyane Wade (6)	American Airlines Arena; 17,684	9–6
16	November 29	Boston	L 85–92	Dwyane Wade (27)	Jermaine O'Neal (10)	Dwyane Wade (6)	American Airlines Arena; 18,104	9–7

December: 7–7 (home: 4–3; road: 3–4)

Game	Date	Team	Score	High points	High rebounds	High assists	Location Attendance	Record
17	December 1	@ Portland	W 107–100	Michael Beasley (27)	Quentin Richardson (9)	Dwyane Wade (12)	Rose Garden; 20,417	10–7
18	December 3	@ Denver	L 96–114	Dwyane Wade (25)	Dwyane Wade (10)	Dwyane Wade (4)	Pepsi Center; 14,998	10–8
19	December 4	@ L.A. Lakers	L 107–108	Dwyane Wade (26)	Jermaine O'Neal (10)	Dwyane Wade (9)	Staples Center; 18,997	10–9
20	December 6	@ Sacramento	W 115–102	Dwyane Wade (34)	Udonis Haslem (6)	Dwyane Wade (10)	ARCO Arena; 13,186	11–9
21	December 11	Dallas	L 93–106	Dwyane Wade (28)	Michael Beasley, Dwyane Wade (11)	Dwyane Wade (5)	American Airlines Arena; 18,703	11–10
22	December 13	Memphis	L 90–118	Dwyane Wade (25)	Mario Chalmers (5)	Mario Chalmers (5)	American Airlines Arena; 14,465	11–11
23	December 15	Toronto	W 115–95	Michael Beasley (28)	Michael Beasley (11)	Mario Chalmers (8)	American Airlines Arena; 15,106	12–11
24	December 17	Orlando	W 104–86	Dwyane Wade (25)	Michael Beasley, Dorell Wright (8)	Dwyane Wade, Carlos Arroyo (7)	American Airlines Arena; 18,303	13–11
25	December 20	Portland	L 95–102	Dwyane Wade (28)	Michael Beasley, Udonis Haslem (8)	Dwyane Wade (10)	American Airlines Arena; 16,500	13–12
26	December 23	Utah	W 80–70	Dwyane Wade (29)	Udonis Haslem (11)	Dwyane Wade (5)	American Airlines Arena; 19,600	14–12
27	December 25	@ New York	W 93–87	Dwyane Wade (30)	Dwyane Wade (9)	Dwyane Wade (5)	Madison Square Garden; 19,763	15–12
28	December 27	Indiana	W 114–80	Dwyane Wade (25)	Quentin Richardson (9)	Dwyane Wade (6)	American Airlines Arena; 19,600	16–12
29	December 30	@ New Orleans	L 91–95	Dwyane Wade (22)	Jermaine O'Neal (9)	Dwyane Wade (6)	New Orleans Arena; 17,301	16–13
30	December 31	@ San Antonio	L 78–108	Michael Beasley (26)	Michael Beasley (8)	Dwyane Wade (6)	AT&T Center; 18,581	16–14

January: 8–9 (home: 3–3; road: 5–6)

Game	Date	Team	Score	High points	High rebounds	High assists	Location Attendance	Record
31	January 2	Charlotte	L 97–107	Dwyane Wade (29)	Udonis Haslem (10)	Dwyane Wade (11)	American Airlines Arena; 17,856	16–15
32	January 4	Atlanta	W 92–75	Dwyane Wade (28)	Quentin Richardson (10)	Mario Chalmers (6)	American Airlines Arena; 16,500	17–15
33	January 6	Boston	L 106–112	Dwyane Wade (44)	Udonis Haslem (9)	Dwyane Wade (7)	American Airlines Arena; 19,600	17–16
34	January 8	@ Phoenix	W 109–105	Dwyane Wade (33)	Michael Beasley (10)	Dwyane Wade (8)	U.S. Airways Center; 18,422	18–16
35	January 10	@ L.A. Clippers	L 84–94	Dwyane Wade (24)	Jamal Magloire (8)	Quentin Richardson (3)	Staples Center; 19,060	18–17
36	January 11	@ Utah	L 89–118	Michael Beasley (20)	Udonis Haslem (12)	Dwyane Wade (6)	EnergySolutions Arena; 19,284	18–18
37	January 13	@ Golden State	W 115–102	Dwyane Wade (35)	Udonis Haslem (9)	Dwyane Wade (9)	Oracle Arena; 17,121	19–18
38	January 15	@ Houston	W 115–106	Dwyane Wade (37)	Jermaine O'Neal (13)	Dwyane Wade (8)	Toyota Center; 16,720	20–18
39	January 16	@ Oklahoma City	L 80–98	Michael Beasley (28)	Jermaine O'Neal (9)	Dwyane Wade (6)	Ford Center; 18,203	20–19
40	January 19	Indiana	W 113–83	Dwyane Wade (32)	Michael Beasley (10)	Dorell Wright (5)	American Airlines Arena; 14,986	21–19
41	January 20	@ Charlotte	L 65–104	Dwyane Wade (16)	Dorell Wright (7)	Rafer Alston (4)	Time Warner Cable Arena; 14,212	21–20
42	January 22	@ Washington	W 112–88	Dwyane Wade (32)	Michael Beasley (8)	Dwyane Wade (10)	Verizon Center; 20,173	22–20
43	January 23	Sacramento	W 115–84	Dwyane Wade (27)	Michael Beasley (13)	Dwyane Wade (8)	American Airlines Arena; 18,521	23–20
44	January 25	Cleveland	L 91–92	Dwyane Wade (32)	Dwyane Wade (10)	Dwyane Wade (5)	American Airlines Arena; 19,600	23–21
45	January 27	@ Toronto	L 103–111	Dwyane Wade (35)	Udonis Haslem (11)	Dwyane Wade (10)	Air Canada Centre; 18,265	23–22
46	January 29	@ Detroit	W 92–65	Dwyane Wade (22)	Jermaine O'Neal (11)	Rafer Alston (7)	The Palace of Auburn Hills; 20,669	24–22
47	January 30	@ Milwaukee	L 84–95	Dwyane Wade (21)	Jermaine O'Neal(10)	Dwyane Wade (7)	Bradley Center; 18,717	24–23

February: 5–8 (home: 1–3; road: 4–5)

Game	Date	Team	Score	High points	High rebounds	High assists	Location Attendance	Record
48	February 1	Milwaukee	L 81–97	Dwyane Wade (23)	Udonis Haslem (10)	Dwyane Wade (6)	American Airlines Arena; 15,858	24–24
49	February 3	@ Boston	L 102–107	Dwyane Wade (30)	Udonis Haslem (8)	Dwyane Wade (13)	TD Garden; 18,624	24–25
50	February 4	@ Cleveland	L 86–102	Dwyane Wade (24)	Michael Beasley (12)	Dwyane Wade (9)	Quicken Loans Arena; 20,562	24–26
51	February 6	@ Chicago	L 91–95	Jermaine O'Neal (24)	Jermaine O'Neal (16)	Dwyane Wade (8)	United Center; 22,352	24–27
52	February 9	Houston	W 99–66	Dwyane Wade (17)	Udonis Haslem (14)	Dwyane Wade (7)	American Airlines Arena; 18,654	25–27
53	February 10	@ Atlanta	W 94–76	Jermaine O'Neal (19)	Udonis Haslem (12)	Dwyane Wade (11)	Philips Arena; 17,074	26–27
54	February 16	@ Philadelphia	W 105–78	Dwyane Wade (24)	Quentin Richardson (10)	Carlos Arroyo (7)	Wachovia Center; 15,602	27–27
55	February 17	@ New Jersey	W 87–84	Michael Beasley (23)	Quentin Richardson (14)	Rafer Alston (5)	IZOD Center; 12,251	28–27
56	February 19	@ Memphis	W 100–87 (2OT)	Michael Beasley (30)	Jermaine O'Neal, Quentin Richardson (8)	Carlos Arroyo (6)	FedEx Forum; 16,127	29–27
57	February 20	@ Dallas	L 91–97	Daequan Cook (22)	Jermaine O'Neal (13)	Mario Chalmers (8)	American Airlines Center; 20,328	29–28
58	February 23	Minnesota	L 88–91	Dorell Wright (26)	Michael Beasley (9)	Mario Chalmers (5)	American Airlines Arena; 15,854	29–29
59	February 27	Milwaukee	L 71–94	Jermaine O'Neal (14)	Udonis Haslem (9)	Daequan Cook (3)	American Airlines Arena; 18,883	29–30
60	February 28	@ Orlando	L 80–96	Dwyane Wade (21)	Quentin Richardson (10)	Dwyane Wade (5)	Amway Arena; 17,461	29–31

March: 12–3 (home: 8–2; road: 4–1)

Game	Date	Team	Score	High points	High rebounds	High assists	Location Attendance	Record
61	March 2	Golden State	W 110–106	Dwyane Wade (35)	Jermaine O'Neal (12)	Dwyane Wade (12)	American Airlines Arena; 15,213	30–31
62	March 4	L.A. Lakers	W 114–111	Dwyane Wade (27)	Udonis Haslem (11)	Dwyane Wade (14)	American Airlines Arena; 19,600	31–31
63	March 6	Atlanta	W 100–94	Dwyane Wade (38)	Quentin Richardson (11)	Dwyane Wade (10)	American Airlines Arena; 19,600	32–31
64	March 9	@ Charlotte	L 78–83	Dwyane Wade (27)	Udonis Haslem (11)	Carlos Arroyo (5)	Time Warner Cable Arena; 18,646	32–32
65	March 10	L.A. Clippers	W 108–97	Dwyane Wade (27)	Udonis Haslem (10)	Dwyane Wade (8)	American Airlines Arena; 14,785	33–32
66	March 12	Chicago	W 108–95	Jermaine O'Neal (25)	Joel Anthony (10)	Dwyane Wade (7)	American Airlines Arena; 19,600	34–32
67	March 14	Philadelphia	W 104–91	Dwyane Wade (38)	Udonis Haslem (12)	Carlos Arroyo (10)	American Airlines Arena; 18,129	35–32
68	March 16	San Antonio	L 76–88	Dwyane Wade (28)	Udonis Haslem (12)	Dwyane Wade (5)	American Airlines Arena; 18,925	35–33
69	March 18	Orlando	L 102–108 (OT)	Dwyane Wade (36)	Dwyane Wade (10)	Dwyane Wade (7)	American Airlines Arena; 18,874	35–34
70	March 20	Charlotte	W 77–71	Quentin Richardson (18)	Udonis Haslem (13)	Dwyane Wade (9)	American Airlines Arena; 18,766	36–34
71	March 22	@ New Jersey	W 99–89	Dwyane Wade (27)	Jermaine O'Neal (9)	Dwyane Wade (12)	IZOD Center; 11,934	37–34
72	March 25	@ Chicago	W 103–74	Jermaine O'Neal (24)	Quentin Richardson (8)	Dwyane Wade (10)	United Center; 21,592	38–34
73	March 26	@ Milwaukee	W 87–74	Dwyane Wade (30)	Udonis Haslem (18)	Dwyane Wade (7)	Bradley Center; 17,841	39–34
74	March 28	Toronto	W 97–94	Dwyane Wade (32)	Quentin Richardson (9)	Carlos Arroyo (8)	American Airlines Arena; 19,600	40–34
75	March 31	@ Detroit	W 98–81	Michael Beasley (28)	Udonis Haslem (10)	Carlos Arroyo (8)	The Palace of Auburn Hills; 22,076	41–34

April: 6–1 (home: 2–1; road: 4–0)

Game	Date	Team	Score	High points	High rebounds	High assists	Location Attendance	Record
76	April 2	@ Indiana	W 105–96	Dwyane Wade (43)	Udonis Haslem (11)	Dwyane Wade (6)	Conseco Fieldhouse; 16,787	42–34
77	April 3	@ Minnesota	W 97–84	Dwyane Wade (39)	Udonis Haslem (17)	Carlos Arroyo (9)	Target Center; 17,601	43–34
78	April 7	Philadelphia	W 99–95	Dwyane Wade (22)	Udonis Haslem (11)	Mario Chalmers (5)	American Airlines Arena; 18,221	44–34
79	April 9	Detroit	L 99–106	Dwyane Wade (19)	Udonis Haslem (11)	Dwyane Wade (9)	American Airlines Arena; 19,600	44–35
80	April 11	@ New York	W 111–98	Dwyane Wade (32)	Udonis Haslem (10)	Dwyane Wade (5)	Madison Square Garden; 19,763	45–35
81	April 12	@ Philadelphia	W 107–105	Dwyane Wade (30)	Quentin Richardson (12)	Carlos Arroyo (7)	Wachovia Center; 17,401	46–35
82	April 14	New Jersey	W 94–86 (2OT)	Michael Beasley (25)	Michael Beasley (13)	Mario Chalmers (7)	American Airlines Arena; 18,754	47–35

2009–10 season schedule

== Playoffs ==
=== Game log ===
2010 playoff game log
Total: 1–4 (home: 1–1; road: 0–3)
First round: 1–4 (home: 1–1; road: 0–3)

Game	Date	Team	Score	High points	High rebounds	High assists	Location Attendance	Series
1	April 17	@ Boston	L 76–85	Dwyane Wade (26)	Jermaine O'Neal (9)	Dwyane Wade (6)	TD Garden; 18,624	0–1
2	April 20	@ Boston	L 77–106	Dwyane Wade (29)	Michael Beasley (7)	Dwyane Wade (5)	TD Garden; 18,624	0–2
3	April 23	Boston	L 98–100	Dwyane Wade (34)	Udonis Haslem (8)	Dwyane Wade (8)	American Airlines Arena; 19,500	0–3
4	April 25	Boston	W 101–92	Dwyane Wade (46)	Udonis Haslem (11)	Mario Chalmers, Dwyane Wade (5)	American Airlines Arena; 19,520	1–3
5	April 27	@ Boston	L 86–96	Dwyane Wade (31)	Udonis Haslem (10)	Dwyane Wade (10)	TD Garden; 18,624	1–4

2010 playoff schedule

== Player statistics ==
=== Regular season ===
Player	POS	GP	GS	MP	REB	AST	STL	BLK	PTS	MPG	RPG	APG	SPG	BPG	PPG
Joel Anthony	C	80	16	1,322	249	12	20	109	218	16.5	3.1	.2	.3	1.4	2.7
Michael Beasley	PF	78	78	2,328	498	100	80	49	1,156	29.8	6.4	1.3	1.0	.6	14.8
Udonis Haslem	PF	78	0	2,177	629	52	30	23	771	27.9	8.1	.7	.4	.3	9.9
Dwyane Wade	SG	77	77	2,792	373	501	142	82	2,045	36.3	4.8	6.5	1.8	1.1	26.6
Quentin Richardson	SF	76	75	2,082	374	93	70	18	678	27.4	4.9	1.2	.9	.2	8.9
Mario Chalmers	PG	73	22	1,807	135	246	91	12	521	24.8	1.8	3.4	1.2	.2	7.1
Carlos Arroyo	PG	72	35	1,585	130	225	36	6	439	22.0	1.8	3.1	.5	.1	6.1
Dorell Wright	SF	72	1	1,496	235	91	52	32	510	20.8	3.3	1.3	.7	.4	7.1
Jermaine O'Neal	C	70	70	1,991	486	92	25	95	950	28.4	6.9	1.3	.4	1.4	13.6
Daequan Cook	SG	45	3	691	82	43	14	10	223	15.4	1.8	1.0	.3	.2	5.0
James Jones	SF	36	6	503	45	17	11	4	146	14.0	1.3	.5	.3	.1	4.1
Jamaal Magloire	C	36	0	359	121	1	9	11	77	10.0	3.4	.0	.3	.3	2.1
Rafer Alston^{†}	PG	25	25	655	54	72	23	5	165	26.2	2.2	2.9	.9	.2	6.6
Yakhouba Diawara	SG	6	2	44	4	3	1	0	5	7.3	.7	.5	.2	.0	.8
Shavlik Randolph^{†}	PF	3	0	47	13	0	1	1	10	15.7	4.3	.0	.3	.3	3.3

- ^{†} Denotes player spent time with another team in the season. Stats reflect time with the Heat only.

=== Playoffs ===
Player	POS	GP	GS	MP	REB	AST	STL	BLK	PTS	MPG	RPG	APG	SPG	BPG	PPG
Dwyane Wade	SG	5	5	210	28	34	8	8	166	42.0	5.6	6.8	1.6	1.6	33.2
Quentin Richardson	SF	5	5	149	19	8	8	1	49	29.8	3.8	1.6	1.6	.2	9.8
Michael Beasley	PF	5	5	135	29	3	4	0	52	27.0	5.8	.6	.8	.0	10.4
Jermaine O'Neal	C	5	5	117	28	5	4	10	21	23.4	5.6	1.0	.8	2.0	4.2
Carlos Arroyo	PG	5	5	115	9	11	3	0	26	23.0	1.8	2.2	.6	.0	5.2
Udonis Haslem	PF	5	0	142	37	4	1	1	30	28.4	7.4	.8	.2	.2	6.0
Mario Chalmers	PG	5	0	131	9	13	3	0	54	26.2	1.8	2.6	.6	.0	10.8
Dorell Wright	SF	5	0	112	19	9	2	0	25	22.4	3.8	1.8	.4	.0	5.0
Joel Anthony	C	5	0	79	9	1	2	5	13	15.8	1.8	.2	.4	1.0	2.6
James Jones	SF	1	0	9	0	0	0	0	2	9.0	.0	.0	.0	.0	2.0
Jamaal Magloire	C	1	0	5	1	0	0	0	0	5.0	1.0	.0	.0	.0	.0

== Awards, records and milestones ==
=== Awards ===
==== Week/Month ====
- Dwyane Wade was named Eastern Conference Player of the Week for games played from March 1 through March 7 and from March 22 through 28.
- Dwyane Wade was named Eastern Conference Player of the Month for the month of March.
- Erik Spoelstra was named Eastern Conference Coach of the Month for the month of March.

==== All-Star ====
- Dwyane Wade was voted as an NBA Eastern Conference All-Star starter. (6th appearance)
- Michael Beasley was selected to the Sophomores team in the Rookie Challenge.

==== Season ====
- Dwyane Wade was named MVP of the All-star game.
- Dwyane Wade was named to the All-NBA First Team.
- Dwyane Wade was named to the NBA All-Defensive Second Team.

=== Milestones ===
- On January 16, 2010, Dwyane Wade became the Heat all-time assists leader surpassing Tim Hardaway.

== Transactions ==
Miami Heat

Players Added

Via Draft
Via Free Agency

- Carlos Arroyo
- Shavlik Randolph
- Rafer Alston

Via Trade

- Quentin Richardson (From Timberwolves)
Players Lost

Via Free Agency

- Jamario Moon (To Cavaliers)

Via Trade

- Mark Blount (To Timberwolves)

Waived
