= Don Bosco School =

Don Bosco School may refer to:

== India ==
- Don Bosco College, Maram
- Assam Don Bosco University
- Don Bosco College, Tura
- Don Bosco Academy, Patna
- Don Bosco Bandel, West Bengal
- Don Bosco College of Engineering, in Goa
- Don Bosco High & Technical School, Liluah, Howrah, West Bengal
- Don Bosco High School (Imphal)
- Don Bosco High School, Matunga, Mumbai
- Don Bosco High School, Baghchung
- Don Bosco High School, Guwahati
- Don Bosco High School, Hojai
- Don Bosco Higher Secondary School, Irinjalakuda, Kerala
- Don Bosco Institute of Technology, Bangalore
- Don Bosco Matriculation Higher Secondary School, Chennai, Egmore, Chennai
- Don Bosco School, Park Circus, Kolkata
- St. Don Bosco's College, Lakhimpur Kheri
- Don Bosco School, Berhampore, Berhampore
- Don Bosco School, Siliguri
- Don Bosco School, Alaknanda, New Delhi

== Pakistan ==
- Don Bosco Catholic School, Bannu

== The Philippines ==
- Caritas Don Bosco School, Biñan
- Don Bosco College, Canlubang
- Don Bosco Technical College, Mandaluyong
- Don Bosco Technical College–Cebu
- Don Bosco Technical Institute, Makati
- Don Bosco Technical Institute, Tarlac
- Don Bosco Technical Institute, Victorias
- Don Bosco Academy, Pampanga
- Don Bosco School, Manila

== United States ==
- Don Bosco Technical Institute, Rosemead, California
- Don Bosco Cristo Rey High School, Takoma Park, Maryland
- Don Bosco High School, now part of Saint Thomas More High School, Saint Francis, Wisconsin
- Don Bosco Preparatory High School, Ramsey, New Jersey
- Don Bosco Technical High School (Boston), Massachusetts
- Don Bosco Technical High School (New Jersey), Paterson, New Jersey (closed 2002)
- Don Bosco High School (Iowa)
- St. John Bosco High School, Bellflower, California

== Other countries ==
- Don Bosco Cambodia
- Don Bosco Catholic Secondary School, Ontario, Canada

== See also ==
- Don Bosco Institute of Technology (disambiguation)
- List of Salesian schools
- St John Bosco College (disambiguation)
