= Sacred Heart Church, Battersea =

Sacred Heart Church
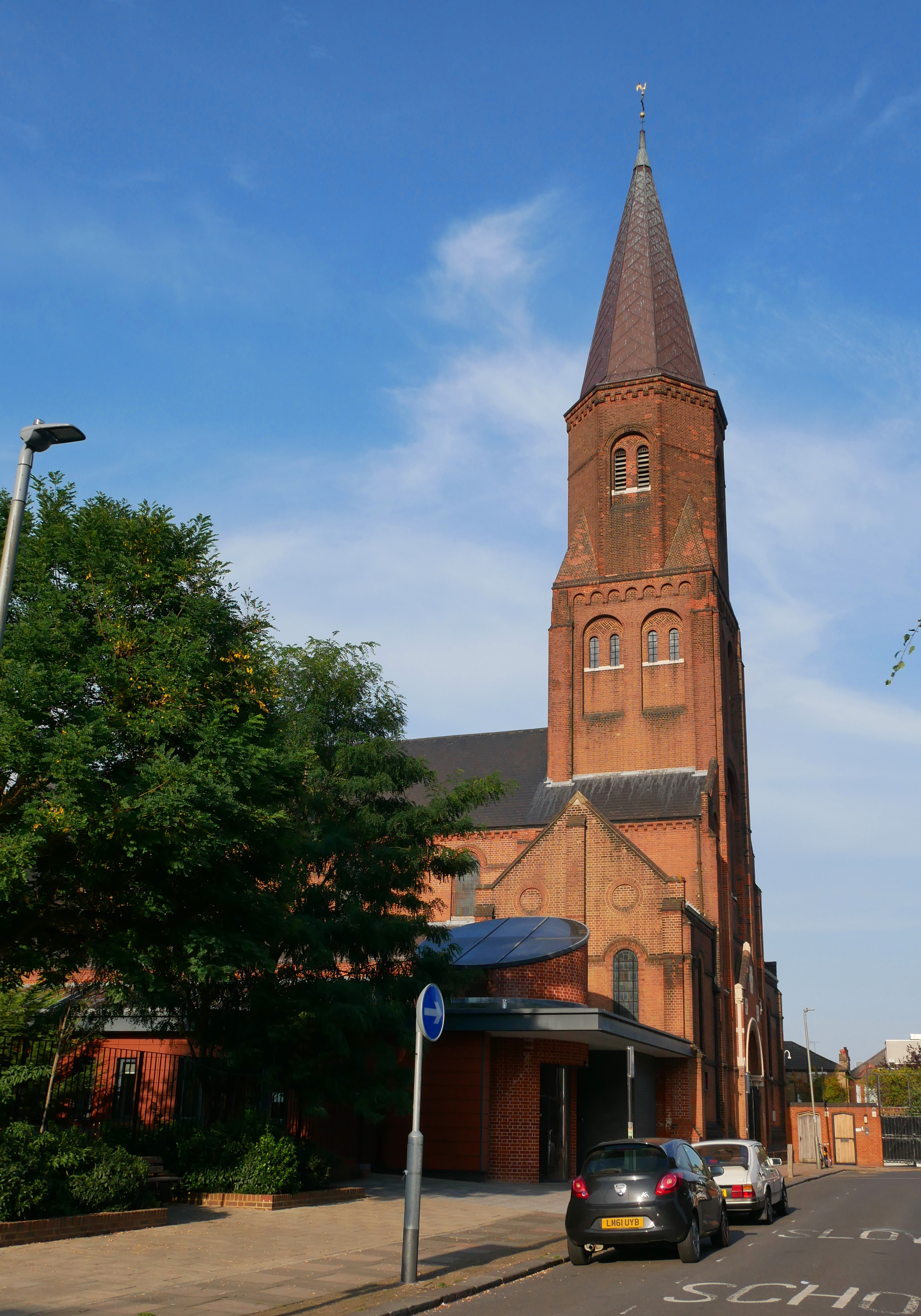
- Sacred Heart Church Battersea
- Sacred Heart Church
- 51.4738°N 0.1729°W
- OS grid reference: TQ 26879 76618
- Location: Battersea, South West London
- Country: England
- Denomination: Roman Catholic

History
- Dedicated: 14–15 October 1893

Architecture
- Architect: Frederick Walters
- Style: Romanesque Revival

Administration
- Diocese: Southwark

The Sacred Heart Church is a Roman Catholic church and parish in Trott Street, Battersea, South West London, that serves the Catholic community of Battersea and surrounding areas.

== History ==
The church was designed by Frederick Walters in a late Norman style. It is built in red brick, with stone sills and some stone dressings entrance. The West Tower has an octagonal broached steeple. Inside, the ceiling is vaulted. The spire is copper clad.

The church was founded by priests of the Salesians. In November 1887, Saint Don Bosco (1815–1888) sent 3 Salesians to Battersea to form the first UK Salesian community, at the invitation of Countess Georgiana de Stacpoole, a notable benefactress of the Salesians in Paris. A small iron church was built at first, funded by the Countess, but a larger congregation demanded a larger building. On 3 August 1892 Bishop Butt blessed the first stone of the present church, which was dedicated on 14–15 October 1893.

The original metal church was offered for sale and purchased by William Edward Baily, who dismantled and moved it to Penzance.

== See also ==
- St John Bosco College, Battersea
- Salesian College, Battersea
