= Mr. Moirang Khamba =

Bodybuilding competition in Manipur

Mr. Moirang Khamba (ꯃꯤꯁ꯭ꯇꯔ ꯃꯣꯏꯔꯥꯡ ꯈꯝꯕ), also known as Mr. Manipur Moirang Khamba (ꯃꯤꯁ꯭ꯇꯔ ꯃꯅꯤꯄꯨꯔ ꯃꯣꯏꯔꯥꯡ ꯈꯝꯕ) or Mr. Manipur Khamba (ꯃꯤꯁ꯭ꯇꯔ ꯃꯅꯤꯄꯨꯔ ꯈꯝꯕ), is an annual bodybuilding competition held in the Indian state of Manipur, inspired by the legendary Meitei hero Moirang Khamba from the ancient Moirang kingdom. The event celebrates physical strength, discipline, and cultural pride, drawing its name and spirit from Khamba, renowned in Meitei folklore for his bravery, physique, and moral integrity. The competition forms a part of a broader bodybuilding championship series that includes prestigious titles such as Mr. Manipur, Mr. Pari Shajou, Mr. Khamba, and Mr. Kangleipak for men, as well as Miss Kangleipak for women. Rooted in both athleticism and heritage, Mr. Moirang Khamba serves as a platform to promote fitness, youth empowerment, and the valorous legacy of Meitei tradition. It is organised by All Manipur Gymnasium Welfare Association.

== Categories ==
The Mr. Manipur Moirang Khamba contest has several categories, including Junior, Senior, Master, Physically Challenged.

== Winners ==
=== 2013 ===
A total of 87 competitors from 23 gyms participated in the Mr. Moirang Khamba 2013 Bodybuilding Championship.

- Senior Category
  - Senior 55 KG:
    - L. Kiran Singh from KBB Gym secured 1st place.
    - L. Biswajit from United Gym Manipur took 2nd place.
    - T. Rakesh Meetei from Lamyanba Meetei Gym came in 3rd.
    - S. Robert from M.M. GYH Heingang placed 4th.
    - Y. Bhogendro Singh from KBB Gym finished 5th.
  - Senior 60 KG:
    - Md. Mutibur Rahaman from Super Gym Khurai won 1st place.
    - Th. Sanjoy Singh from JBC Singjamei took 2nd place.
    - L. Noren from Lamyanba Gym placed 3rd.
    - K. Nepolean Sharma from United Gym Manipur secured 4th place.
    - Kh. Chuku from United Gym Manipur finished in 5th place.
  - Senior 65 KG:
    - Sh. Kanta Singh from YPISM Uripok claimed 1st place.
    - P. Romesh Meetei from Pamkhal came in 2nd.
    - Kh. Hemanta from Manipur Police finished 3rd.
    - L. Robert Meitei from Royal Gym placed 4th.
    - Md. Shahidur Rahman from Health Studio took 5th place.
  - Senior 70 KG:
    - L. Ojit from Manipur Police secured 1st place.
    - M. Amar Singh from Sangai Gym finished 2nd.
    - K. Herojit from KBB Gym placed 3rd.
    - L. Inaotombi Singh from Subol Fitness Oinam came in 4th.
    - T. Premjit from KBB Gym took 5th place.
  - Senior 75 KG:
    - W. Kiran Singh from Super Gym Khurai won 1st place.
    - Kh. Dineshor Singh from Manipur Police came in 2nd.
    - Ng. Surchandra Singh from Manipur Police placed 3rd.
    - Vivekanand Khangembam from Eastern Iron Gym Naharup secured 4th place.
    - K. Gosta Kumar from X-Fitness finished 5th.
- Master Category
  - Master 40–50 Years:
    - P. Romesh Meetei from Pamkhal claimed 1st place.
    - L. Kiran Singh from KBB Gym came in 2nd.
    - A. Premchand from Super Gym Khurai placed 3rd.
    - K. Gosta Kumar from X-Fitness finished 4th.
    - Th. Sanjoy Singh from JBC Singjamei took 5th place.
  - Master 50–55 Years:
    - K. Khomei Kabui from X-Fitness won 1st place.
    - L. Athoiba from KBB Gym came in 2nd.
    - K. Ranjit Singh from Lamyanba Meetei Gym secured 3rd place.
  - Master 55+ Years:
    - L. Modhu Singh from E.C. Gym claimed 1st place.
    - Y. Nando Luwang from KBB Gym came in 2nd.
    - Y. Sanatomba Singh from United Gym Manipur placed 3rd.
    - T. Ibohal Singh from IBC Thangmeiband finished 4th.
- Master Overall Champion:
  - P. Romesh Meetei from Pamkhal was declared the overall champion.
  - L. Modhu Singh from E.C. Gym secured 2nd place overall.
  - K. Khomei Kabui from X-Fitness finished 3rd overall.
- Junior Category
  - Junior Overall Champion:
    - M. Sanamanik from Manipur Police was declared the overall champion.
    - Y. Open Singh from Manipur Police took 2nd place.
    - H. Santosh from Royal Gym secured 3rd place.
    - Narisingh Khundrakpam from YPISM Uripok placed 4th.
    - W. Bimolchandra from Super Gym Khurai came in 5th.
    - Rk. Johnson from Callisthenics secured 6th place.
  - Junior 55 KG:
    - Rk. Johnson from Callisthenics Health Circuit won 1st place.
    - N. Kapail from United Gym Manipur came in 2nd.
    - L. Meiraba from Lucky Gym secured 3rd place.
    - M. Ashinikumar Singh from Eastern Iron Gym Naharup placed 4th.
    - L. Ramananda from KBB Gym finished 5th.
  - Junior 60 KG:
    - Narisingh Khundrakpam from YPISM Uripok won 1st place.
    - S. Robert from Callisthenics came in 2nd.
    - N. Chalamba Singh from United Gym Manipur secured 3rd place.
    - L. Lanchenba Meitei from Super Gym Khurai placed 4th.
    - L. Sunil Meitei from KBB Gym finished 5th.
  - Junior 65 KG:
    - H. Santosh from Royal Gym secured 1st place.
    - Kh. Amarjit Singh from Super Gym Khurai took 2nd place.
    - H. Robikumar from Royal Gym placed 3rd.
    - L. Nillakanta Singh from KBB Gym came in 4th.
    - O. Peter Singh from Sangai Gym took 5th place.
  - Junior 70 KG:
    - Y. Open Singh from Manipur Police won 1st place.
    - E. Raju Singh from Manipur Police came in 2nd.
    - Shyamal Adhikary from Royal Gym placed 3rd.
    - N. Monish Singh from W.A.C Gym secured 4th place.
    - L. Rosan from Impact Gym Moirang finished 5th.
  - Junior 75 KG:
    - W. Bimolchandra from Super Gym Khurai won 1st place.
    - Kh. Bhumeshwor from KBB Gym took 2nd place.
    - T. Bhugendro from Royal Gym secured 3rd place.
    - P. Premkumar Singh from Impact Gym Moirang came in 4th.
    - K. Kennedy from Callisthenics Health Circuit placed 5th.
  - Junior 80 KG:
    - M. Shaolin Singh from United Gym Manipur secured 1st place.
    - A. Kishore Singh from KBB Gym took 2nd place.
    - Kh. Ibotomba Singh from Callisthenics Health Circuit came in 3rd.
  - Junior 80+ KG:
    - N. Suraj from Royal Gym won 1st place.
    - T. Joychandra from KBB Gym finished 2nd.
    - K. Arnold Singh from Manipur Police placed 3rd.
- Senior Overall Champion:
- M. Shaolin Singh from United Gym Manipur was declared the overall senior champion.
- N. Suraj from Royal Gym came in 2nd place.
- W. Kiran Singh from Super Gym Khurai secured 3rd place.
- Sh. Kanta Singh from YPISM Uripok placed 4th.
- L. Ojit from Manipur Police came in 5th.
- L. Kiran Singh from KBB Gym took 6th place.
- Md. Mutibur Rahaman from Super Gym Khurai secured 7th place.
- Team Awards:
  - Manipur Police was awarded the Team Champion title.
  - KBB Gym was named Team Champion Runners-Up.
  - The Sanaroi Khwoaidagi Puthokpa award was also given to KBB Gym.

=== 2013-14 ===
- N. Johnbush Singh of Health Studio, Mayang Imphal won the title of 2nd Mr. Moirang Khamba 2013–14 in the Junior 55 kg category at a State-level bodybuilding contest. The event was held at GM Hall and organized by the All Manipur Gymnasium Welfare Association (AMGWA).
- Winners in other categories include:
  - S. Robert of Callisthenic Health Circuit – 1st place in the Junior 60 kg category.
  - H. Santosh Kumar Singh of Royal Gym, Ningomthong – 1st in the Junior 65 kg category.
  - Y. Open Singh of MPSC – 1st in the Junior 70 kg category.
  - L. Ranadeep of Royal Gym, Ningomthong – 1st in the Junior 75 kg category.
  - S. Bungcha Singh of Super Gym, Khurai – 1st in the Junior 75+ kg category.
- In the Masters category, the winners were:
  - Th. Suraj Singh of YPISM, Uripok – 1st in the 40–50 years category.
  - S. Inaobi of Unique Gym, Ningomthong – 1st in the 50–60 years category.
  - L. Modhu of X-Fitness – 1st in the above 60 years category.
- In the Physically Challenged category, P. Premkumar of Unique Gym was the winner.
- In the Senior category, Md. Idrish of Al-Ummah secured 1st place.
- In the Masters weight categories, the winners were:
  - L. Neta Singh of United Gym – 1st in the 55 kg category.
  - N. Naoba of Royal Gym, Ningomthong – 1st in the 60 kg category.
  - Lanchenba of AMGWA – 1st in the 65 kg category.
  - K. Dinesh of YPISM – 1st in the 70 kg category.
  - Kh. Dineshwor of MPSC – 1st in the 75 kg category.
  - N. Suraj of Royal Gym, Ningomthong – 1st in the 80 kg category.
  - W. Bimolchandra Singh of Super Gym – 1st in the 85 kg category.

=== 2014 ===
- N. Suraj of Royal Gym, Ningomthong won his second senior title, while Manipur Police Sports Club (MPSC) was declared the overall team champion at the 3rd Mr. Manipur Moirang Khamba Championship.
- A total of 95 bodybuilders from various gyms across the state participated in the championship.
- YPISM, Uripok won the team runners-up title, and KBB Gym, Tera was awarded for fielding the highest number of participants.
- Y. Nilbir of MPSC received the Best Coach award, and L. Robert of Royal Gym, Ningomthong was named Best Poser.
- In the individual overall categories:
  - R.K. Manjit Singh of MPSC won the Junior Overall title.
  - N. Suraj Singh of Royal Gym, Ningombam won the Senior Overall title.
  - K. Dineshchandra Singh of YPISM claimed the Overall Masters title.
  - N. Jayenta Singh of KFC, Canchipur won the Physically Challenged title.
  - K. Rebita Devi of Royal Gym, Ningombam won the 1st Women’s State Level Bodybuilding Championship title.
- In the junior weight categories, the top winners were:
  - M. Boramani Singh (55 kg) from KFC Singjamei
  - Rishan Chongtham (60 kg) from YPISM, Uripok
  - N. Robindro Singh (65 kg) from YPISM, Uripok
  - K. Malemnganba Singh (70 kg) from YPISM, Uripok
  - Y. Open Singh (75 kg) from MPSC
  - R.K. Manjit Singh (75+ kg) from MPSC
- In the senior weight categories, the 1st place winners were:
  - L. Neta (55 kg) from United Gym, Naoremthong
  - Kh. Hemanta Singh (60 kg) from MPSC
  - L. Robert (65 kg) from Royal Gym, Ningomthong
  - L. Ojitkumar Singh (70 kg) from MPSC
  - K. Arnold Singh (75 kg) from MPSC
  - Ng. Surchandra Singh (80 kg) from MPSC
  - N. Suraj Singh (80+ kg) from Royal Gym, Ningomthong
- In the masters category, the winners were:
  - K. Dineshchandra Singh (40–50 years) from YPISM, Uripok
  - M. Ranjit Meitei (50–60 years) from Power Gym, Yaiskul
  - Y. Nando Singh (60+ years) from KFC, Singjamei

== See also ==
- Femina Miss Manipur
- Meitei martial arts
- Meitei traditional weapons
- Meitei traditional toys
- Meitei traditional games
