= DBIT =

DBIT may refer to:

- Don Bosco Institute of Technology, Bangalore
- Dev Bhoomi Institute of Technology, Dehradun
