= St John Bosco College =

St John Bosco College is the name of a number of schools and colleges. Most have a religious heritage and are named after John Bosco:

- St John Bosco College, Battersea, London, England
- St John Bosco College, Sydney, Australia
- St John Bosco Arts College, Liverpool, England

== See also ==
- Don Bosco School (disambiguation)
- List of Salesian schools
