= Mr. Kangleipak =

Bodybuilding contest in Manipur

Mr. Kangleipak, also known as Mister Kangleipak (ꯃꯤꯁ꯭ꯇꯔ ꯀꯪꯂꯩꯄꯥꯛ), is an annual bodybuilding competition held in Manipur, India, named after Kangleipak, the ancient Meitei name of the region that reflects its cultural and historical heritage. The event celebrates physical excellence, discipline, and dedication to fitness, bringing together male athletes from across the state to compete for the title. Positioned as a symbol of strength and cultural pride, Mr. Kangleipak stands alongside other notable state-level contests such as Mr. Manipur, Mr. Khamba, Mr. Moirang Khamba, and Mr. Pari Shajou for men, and Miss Kangleipak for women.

It is organized by the Manipur Amateur Body Building Association (MABBA), and sponsored by Ningthemcha Ningol Chongtham Ongbi Sanatombi Devi Memorial Trust. The event features senior, junior, and sub-junior athletes who compete in four height categories: short, medium, tall, and super tall. The contest aims to promote health and a disease-free lifestyle in Manipur. It encourages healthy competition and physical wellness.

The men's physique competition features athletes competing in two height categories: above 172 cm and below 172 cm. The classic physique event is held as an open category.

== Categories and prizes ==
=== Overall Winners ===
Overall winners	Cash prizes
Senior	₹50,000
Junior	₹40,000
Sub-junior	₹30,000

=== Top 3 by Height Group ===
Senior category	Cash prizes
1st	₹7,000
2nd	₹5,000
3rd	₹3,000
4th and 5th Place	₹1,000 each

Junior category	Cash prizes
1st	₹5,000
2nd	₹3,000
3rd	₹2,000
4th and 5th Place	₹1,000 each

Sub-junior category	Cash prizes
1st	₹4,000
2nd	₹3,000
3rd	₹2,000
4th and 5th Place	₹1,000 each

=== Special Events ===
Special Events	Cash prizes
Men's Physique	₹30,000
Men's Classic Physique	₹20,000
Women's Physique	₹10,000
Masters' Overall Winner	₹10,000

=== Gym Teams ===
Gym Teams	Cash prizes
Team Champion	₹10,000
Runners-up	₹5,000

== Winners ==
=== 2012 ===
- M Shaolin from Patriots Gym won the Mr. Kangleipak 2012 title at the MFDC Auditorium.
- W Priyobarta from United Gym won the Junior overall title.

=== 2016 ===
- Laitonjam Rishikanta of Kanglei Body-Builders (KBB), Tera, was crowned Mr. Kangleipak at the first Fitness and seventh Mr. Kangleipak Contest, 2016. He won the gold medal in the senior tall group and claimed the overall title.
- L. Shantikumar of School of Body-Builders, Kwakeithel, won the junior Mr. Kangleipak title.
- L. Jamesson of KBB Gym, Tera, emerged as the winner in the sub-junior category.
- M. Amar of Sangai Gym clinched the Mr. Kangleipak title in the master category.
- Bribasil Yanglem of JBC Singjamei won the overall title in the men's fitness event, 168 cm group.
- S. Bungcha of Super Gym, Khurai, claimed the title in the masters group (above 50 years).

=== 2019 ===
- Senior Men's Category
  - Overall Senior Men's Winner: Laitonjam Rishikanta of KBB Gym, Tera
  - Short Category (6 participants):
    - 1st: L Neta Singh (United Gym, Manipur)
    - 2nd: Khaidem Washington Singh (Salai Body Sculpture)
    - 3rd: Nirpen Singh (SBBF)
    - 4th: Chingkheinganba (KBB Gym)
    - 5th: Amom Suraj Meitei (NT Gym)
  - Medium Category:
    - 1st: Maradona Kshetrimayum (The Gym Reborn)
    - 2nd: Wangkheirakpam Priyobarta Singh (United Gym, Manipur)
    - 3rd: Ayekpam Jagdish (Star Gym)
  - Tall Category:
    - 1st: Laitonjam Rishikanta (KBB Gym)
    - 2nd: Mutum Amar Singh (Sangai Gym)
  - Super Tall Category:
    - 1st: RK Suresh (Gold's Gym)
    - 2nd: Longjam Shantikumar (SBBF)
    - 3rd: Thiyam Premjit Meitei (KBB Gym)
- Sub-Junior Category
  - Short Category:
    - 1st: Abujam Amarjit Luwang (SBBF, Kwakeithel)
    - 2nd: Robert Mayanglambam (Star Gym)
    - 3rd: Sanajaoba Nongmeikapam (NFC, Nambol)
    - 4th: Thounaojam Ajay Singh (Mountain Gym, Thangmeiband)
    - 5th: Md Shahabaj Shah (United Gym, Naoremthong)
  - Medium Category:
    - 1st: Yendrembam Rakesh Singh (Divine Physique Gym, Khurai)
    - 2nd: Potshangbam Chandrakanta Singh (Star Gym)
    - 3rd: Nomthombam Sadananda Singh (RFA, Thoubal)
    - 4th: Hawaibam Surdas Singh (Pravabati Fitness Centre)
    - 5th: Meisnam Ronaldo Singh (Salai Body Sculpture)
  - Tall Category:
    - 1st: Konjengbam Dhruba Yotish (JBC, Singjamei)
    - 2nd: Maibam Karan (SBBF)
- Ch Rahul won the sub-junior tall title
- Junior Category
  - Short Group:
    - 1st: Laishram Gopeshwor Meitei (Pravabati Fitness Centre)
    - 2nd: Mutum Sanjit Singh (Subol Fitness Centre, Oinam)
    - 3rd: Lallen Dimngel (GYM 24)
    - 4th: Soraisham Kamcha Singh (Lainingthou Lam Ahingba Fitness)
    - 5th: Thounaojam Alex Singh (SBBF)
  - Medium Group:
    - 1st: H Minaketan Meitei (ASK Gym, Kakching)
    - 2nd: Soraisham Priyankar Singh (KBB Gym)
    - 3rd: Keisham Jemson Meitei (Star Gym)
    - 4th: Maibam Ronald Singh (Lifestyle Fitness Gym, Sangaiprou)
    - 5th: Roni Moirangthem (Salai Body Sculpture)
  - Tall Group:
    - 1st: Sh Malemnganba Meitei (Salai Body Sculpture)
    - 2nd: N Niranjan Singh (Cleopatra Fitness Centre)
    - 3rd: Loitongbam Philip Singh (Star Gym)
  - Super Tall Group:
    - 1st: Sougrakpam Kishan Singh (RFA, Thoubal)
    - 2nd: T Malemnganba Meitei
- Women's Bodybuilding
    - 1st: Engudam Kavita Devi (KBB Gym, Tera)
    - 2nd: Sonia Laishangbam (The Gym Reborn)
    - 3rd: N Bichitra Devi (The Gym Reborn)
- Physically Challenged: Yumlembam Chinglen (Gym 24) won the title.
- Master's Category
  - 40 Years Group:
    - 1st: Kangjam Dinesh (SBBF)
    - 2nd: Dr. Satyakumar Singh Thokchom (The Gym Reborn)
    - 3rd: Mutum Amar Singh (Sangai Gym)
    - 4th: Khaidem Washington Singh (Salai Body Sculpture)
  - 50 Years Group:
    - 1st: Nameirakpam Ojit Singh (U Fitness Centre)
    - 2nd: Salam Tomcha Singh (Subol Fitness)
    - 3rd: Kiran Singh (KBB Gym)
    - 4th: Nameirakpam Ojit Singh
  - 60 Years Group:
    - 1st: Chandam Indira Singh (KBB Gym)
    - 2nd: Ngariyanbam Biramangol Singh (SBBF)
    - 3rd: RK Naransana (SBBF)
- Men's Physique
  - Above 170 cm:
    - 1st: Maradona Yumnam (KBB Gym)
    - 2nd: Surfaraj (Gold's Gym, Chingamathak)
    - 3rd: N Niranjan Singh (Cleopatra Fitness Centre, Nambol)
    - 4th: Thiyam Premjit Meitei (KBB, Tera)
    - 5th: T Malemnganba Meitei (Perfect Fitness Centre, Porompat)
  - Below 170 cm:
    - 1st: Mutum Sanjit Singh (Subol Fitness Centre)
    - 2nd: Thounaojam Ajay Singh (Mountain Gym, Thangmeiband)
    - 3rd: Robert Mayanglambam (Star Gym)
    - 4th: Rajkumar Kenson Singh (Salai Body Sculpture)
    - 6th: Hawaibam Surdas (Pravabati Fitness Centre)

=== 2022 ===
The Mr. Kangleipak Contest 2022 featured multiple bodybuilding and physique categories, with 96 teams from 17 gyms across Manipur participating.

- Sub-Junior Bodybuilding: Phamdom Arun of MK Fitness Centre won the sub-junior short category, with Nameirakpam Dutta (XTreme Fitness) and Leihao Mathew (Pravabati Fitness) finishing second and third. Wangkhem Naocha Meitei (SBBF) and W Sansan Singh (Smart Fitness) placed fourth and fifth.
- In the sub-junior medium height category, Yumnam Thomas of KBB Gym secured first place. Hijam Deepak Singh (Pravabati FC) and Elangbam Churchill (Emoinu Gym) came second and third, while Minaketan Hawaibam and Moirangthem Kabichandra, both from Smart Fitness, placed fourth and fifth.
- Moirangthem Lamjingba of KBB Gym claimed first place in both the sub-junior tall and super tall categories. In both events, Paikhomba Thoudam (Pravabati FC) came second, and Mutum Punshiba Meitei (MK Fitness Centre) placed third.
- Junior Bodybuilding: Khumukcham Warren of Smart Fitness–Nambol won the junior short height category, followed by Taibanglakpa Leishangthem (Pravabati Fitness), Moirangthem Pareihanba Meitei (Lamyanba Gym), Ningthoujam Raj (Lamyanba Gym), and Potsangbam Binod Meitei (MK Fitness Centre).
- In the junior medium height category, Ksh Sarjukumar of Pravabati FC finished first. Elangbam Jonish (MK Fitness Centre), Moirangthem Miliner (Lamyanba Gym), and Chongtham James (Icon Gym) placed second to fourth.
- Leishanthem Bishwarjit of YBBC Gym–Yurembam won the junior tall category, followed by Hawaibam Surdas (Pravabati FC), Phamdom Johnson (MK Fitness Centre), and Yaikhomba Sanabam (Lamyanba Gym).
- In the junior super tall category, Lourembam Napolean (Lamyanba Gym) finished first, Henba Thokchom (Pravabati FC) second, and Karnajit Huiningshungbam (MK Fitness Centre) third.
- Men's Physique: Oinam Libert Meitei (MK Fitness Centre) won the below 165 cm men's physique title. Longjam Johny and Kshetrimayum Sarojkumar (both from Pravabati Fitness Centre) placed second and third. Phamdom Arun Meetei (MK Fitness Centre) and Hawaibam Sushilkumar (Smart Fitness) came fourth and fifth.
- In the above 165 cm men's physique category, Hawaibam Surdas (Pravabati Fitness Centre) took first place. Leishangthem Bishwarjit Singh (YMBC Gym) and Moirangthem Sagar Singh (Blue Tooth Gym) finished second and third. Henba Thokchom (Pravabati FC) and Moirangthem Kabichandra (Smart Fitness) secured fourth and fifth places.
- Masters Bodybuilding: Chongtham Naochinglen of KBB Gym was crowned champion in the above 40 years category. Thongam Debajaji and Yumnam Tomba (both from 35 AR Royal Gym) finished second and third, and Laimayum Sekhorjit of NT Gym placed fourth.
- In the above 50 years category, Khumukcham Bijinta (KBB Gym) won first place, while Moirangthem Ranjit (NT Gym) came second.

=== 2024 ===
Ramaswami Karam and S Ruslam won titles at the Mr. Kangleipak 2024 bodybuilding contest. Ramaswami was the overall winner in the junior group, and Ruslam was the overall winner in the sub-junior group.

== See also ==
- Meitei culture
- Khuman Khamba
- Femina Miss Manipur
- Meitei martial arts
- Meitei traditional weapons
- Meitei traditional toys
- Meitei traditional games
