= Mr. Manipur =

Bodybuilding competition in Manipur

Mr. Manipur (ꯃꯤꯁ꯭ꯇꯔ ꯃꯅꯤꯄꯨꯔ) is an annual bodybuilding competition held in the Indian state of Manipur, showcasing the state's top male athletes in the field of physique and fitness. Organized to promote health, discipline, and athletic excellence, the event draws participants from across the state and serves as a platform for aspiring bodybuilders to gain recognition at both regional and national levels. Mr. Manipur is one of the oldest and most prominent bodybuilding titles in the region, alongside other competitions such as Mr. Khamba, Mr. Moirang Khamba, Mr. Pari Shajou and Mr. Kangleipak for men, and Miss Kangleipak for women. It is organised by All Manipur Body Builders Association (AMBBA).

== Categories and titles ==
The state-level event features senior and junior men competing for top bodybuilding titles. Senior men compete in 9 weight categories, and junior men in 6 weight categories. Masters men compete in 3 age group categories.

Competitions for women’s bodybuilding, physically challenged men’s bodybuilding, and men’s and women’s sports physique are open to all participants.

The weight and age categories set by AMBBA are:

- Senior Men: 55 kg, 60 kg, 65 kg, 70 kg, 75 kg, 80 kg, 85 kg, 90 kg, 90+ kg
- Junior Men: 55 kg, 60 kg, 65 kg, 70 kg, 75 kg, 75+ kg
- Masters Men: 40–50 years, 50–60 years, 60+ years

== Winners ==
=== 2007 & 2008 ===
Khundrakpam Pradipkumar, an HIV-positive bodybuilder, won the 'Mr Manipur' title twice, in 2007, & in the 60 kg category in 2008.

=== 2011 ===
- N. London Singh wins the Mr Manipur title at the 45th Senior Mr Manipur Contest, along with a Rs 50,000 cash prize. He had earlier won the Junior Mr India title in 2009.
- In other categories:
  - T. Langamba Singh of YBB Gym wins the Junior Mr Manipur title.
  - A. Premchand Singh of Super Gym wins in the Masters category.
  - In the physically challenged division, I. Ranjit Singh wins the under-70 kg title, while Premkumar Singh wins the above-70 kg title.

- In the women’s fitness category:
  - L. Baby Chanu wins the above-160 cm title.
  - Rebika Devi wins the below-160 cm title.
- Young Body-Builder Gym is named overall team champion, and Thoubal District Body-Building and Fitness Association is the runner-up.
- I. Bipin Singh of Young Body-Builder Gym, Pishumthong, receives the Best Coach award.

=== 2012 ===
- T. Lalngamba Meitei of YBB Gym, Pishum is crowned Mr Manipur 2012 at the Asha Cinema Complex.
- The event includes the 46th Senior, 40th Junior, 22nd Masters, and 4th Women’s Fitness Championships, organized by the All Manipur Body Building and Fitness Association (AMBBA).
- Lalngamba Meitei, winner in the 65+ kg and 70 kg categories, beats S. Shiroy Meitei of KBBTC Kakching (winner in the 55+ kg and 60 kg categories) to claim the overall Mr Manipur title.
- Other Winners:
  - Junior Overall Mr Manipur: Ningthoujam Suraj (YBB Gym)
- Women’s Fitness:
  - 1st: Lairenjam Baby Chanu (YPISM, Uripok)
  - 2nd: Phurailatpam Lakshmi Kumari (YPISM)
  - 3rd: Chingtham Devjani (World Gym and Fitness Centre, Imphal)

- Masters (Below 50 years): K. Dineshchandra (YBB)
- Masters (Above 50 years): Chandam Indira Singh (YBB)

- Junior Category Winners by Weight:
  - Up to 55 kg: R.K. Johnson Singh (Callisthenics Health Circuit, Tera)
  - 60 kg: Nara Singh Khundrakpam (YPISM)
  - 65 kg: Ng. Jolly Roger (Hakchang Lifestyle and Fitness, Keishampat)
  - 70 kg & 75 kg: Khangjrakpam Ibotomba Singh (CHC)

=== 2018 ===
Laitonjam Rishikanta Singh was crowned with 52nd Mr. Manipur title.

=== 2021 ===
- AMBBA General Secretary Yumlembam Sunanta reports that 158 bodybuilders (men and women) from 56 gyms across Manipur take part in the 2021 competition.
- MPSC wins the overall team championship, while Royal Gym, Ningomthong is the runner-up. Kanglei Fitness Centre, Kiyamgei has the highest number of participants across all seven competition groups.
- Maradona Kshetrimayum wins the Senior Mr Manipur title at the 59th Mr Manipur 2021 contest held in Imphal, organized by the All Manipur Body Builders Association (AMBBA). So far, Manipur has produced over 10 Mr India title holders, 3 Junior Mr World winners, and one Mr World winner.
- W. Priyobrata of Liangtuang Gym Kamei Foundation and Bhopendra Nongmeikapam of Manipur Police Sports Club (MPSC) take second and third places.
- In the Women’s Bodybuilding competition:
  - Karishma Chingangbam of Super Gym Khurai wins first place
  - Thangjam Leima Chanu of Universal Gymnasium, Kakyai is second
  - Keisam Sinthoibi Mangang of Royal Gym, Ningomthong is third
- In the Masters category:
  - Anthony of Super Gym Khurai wins the overall title
  - Nameirakpam Ojit Singh of Life-style Gym Khongman finishes second
  - Chandam Indira of YBB Gym Pishumthong finishes third
- In the Physically Challenged Bodybuilding event:
  - Naorem Jayanta of Royal Fitness Academy, Thoubal wins first
  - Ahongsangbam Nanao Singh of Bishnu Gym, Bishnupur is second
  - Tharoijam Robin of AMBBA finishes third

=== 2022 ===
- Maradona Kshetrimayum from Muscle Factory, Kakching wins the Mr. Manipur 2022 title at the 60th Mr. Manipur contest.
- Melson Nongmeikapam of Royal Gym, Ningomthong finishes second and receives INR 50,000, while Konthoujam Arnold of Manipur Police Sports Club (MPSC) places third, earning INR 30,000.
- In the junior category, Chingkheinganba Athokpam of Royal Fitness Academy wins overall first place and receives a Bullet motorcycle worth INR 1.5 lakh.
- Junior 60 kg Category (Top 5):

1. Arubam Anganba Meitei (Humanity Plus Gym) 2. Kangleison Ningombam (Royal Gym) 3. Sachidananda Leimapokpam (Sedo Gym-Hiyanglam) 4. Hijam Telheiba (United Gym Manipur) 5. N Nonghish-Nganba (Royal Gym)

- Junior 65 kg Category (Top 5):

1. Sakibur Yumkhaibam (RCC) 2. Th Johnson Singh (Humanity Plus) 3. Taorem Sanatomba (Friend Fitness Gym) 4. M Barnold (Lainingthou Pangamba Gym) 5. Th Ritesh (LA Son's Gym)

- Junior 70 kg Category (Top 5):

1. Longjam Eillison (Friend Fitness Gym) 2. Th Marco (The Gym Retro) 3. W Boicha (Friend Fitness Gym) 4. Thokchom Yaisana (Royal Gym) 5. Athokpam Arbinda (Royal Fitness Academy)

- Junior 75 kg Category (Top 4):

1. Rivaldo Athokpam (RCC) 2. RK Mojesh (Apunba Fitness Clan) 3. Rockyson Yanglem (Trainers and Trainees Gym) 4. Irandas Takhellambam (KB Gym)

- Junior 75+ kg Category (Top 5):

1. Chingkheinganba Athokpam (Royal Fitness Academy) 2. Khwairakpam Simon (Manipur Fitness Club) 3. Saratlunminthang Touthang (Paka Memorial Gym) 4. Ngashepam Dasobanta (RCC) 5. Nivarshan Mainam

=== 2024 ===
Melson Nongmeikapam from Royal Gym, Ningomthong was crowned Mr Manipur at the 62nd edition of the bodybuilding and physique competition held at Manipur University, Canchipur. The event was organized by the All Manipur Body Builders Association (AMBBA) in collaboration with the Manipur University Students' Union (MUSU).

Leimajam Nongthang, also from Royal Gym, won the overall junior title, and Laishram Okendra won the masters overall title.

Royal Gym, Ningomthong was named the overall team champion and had the highest number of participants. Their coach, Nongmeikapam Bhupendra, was awarded Best Coach.

Sangai Gym, Khagempalli finished as the first runners-up with 24 points, and Icon Gym, Hodam Leirak Maning was the second runners-up.

Junior Winners by Weight Category:

55 kg: Thounaojam Ajaysana (Humanity Plus Fitness Center, Uripok)

60 kg: Sanasam Lanchenba

65 kg: Phandom Arun (OGT Gym, New Checkon)

70 kg: Dhanaraj Gupta (Xtreme-Fitness, Mantripukhri)

75 kg: Thokchom Yaisana (Royal Gym)

75+ kg: Leimajam Nongthang (Royal Gymnasium)

Senior Men's Bodybuilding Winners:

55 kg: Anoubam Sushilkumar (Sangai Gym)

60 kg: Laishram Naresh (Iron Addict Fitness Gym)

65 kg: Laishram Neta (United Gym Manipur)

70 kg: Dhanraj Gupta (Xtreme Fitness)

75 kg: Keithellakpam Malemnganba (OGT Gym)

80 kg: Khumukcham Warren (Royal Gym)

85 kg: Wangkheirakpam Priyobarta (Liantuang Kamei Foundation)

90 kg: Maradona Kshetrimayum (Muscle Factory, Kakching)

90+ kg: Melson Nongmeikapam (Royal Gym)

Masters Bodybuilding Winners:

40–50 yrs: Laishram Okendro (MPSC)

50–60 yrs: Longjam Ratan (Icon Gym)

60+ yrs: Laishram Modhu (X-Fitness, Wangkhei)

Other Winners:

Women's Model Physique (Open): Zenika Naorem (Sangai Gym)

Women's Bodybuilding: Thokchom Sanjeeta (World Gym, Yaiskul)

Physically Challenged Bodybuilding (Open):

1st: Naorem Jayanta (Royal Fitness Academy, Thoubal)

2nd: Linthaongam Longmei (World Gym, Yaiskul)

Men’s Sports Physique:

1st: Oinam Libert (Eagle Guide Gym, Sagolband)

2nd: Leimapokpam Abhishek (Muscle Factory, Kakching)

3rd: Md Fazarul Hussain Epham (3 Brothers Gym, Kongpal)

== See also ==
- Femina Miss Manipur
- Meitei martial arts
- Meitei traditional weapons
- Meitei traditional toys
- Meitei traditional games
