= Don Bosco Institute of Technology =

Don Bosco Institute of Technology is the name of various technical institutions across the world:

- Don Bosco Institute of Technology, Bangalore

== See also ==
- Don Bosco Technical Institute
- Don Bosco School (disambiguation)
