= 2009–10 NBA season =

64th NBA season

- League: National Basketball Association
- Sport: Basketball
- Duration: October 27, 2009 – April 14, 2010; April 17 – May 29, 2010 (Playoffs); June 3 – 17, 2010 (Finals)
- Games: 82
- Teams: 30
- TV partner(s): ABC, TNT, ESPN, NBA TV

Draft
- Top draft pick: Blake Griffin (did not play regular season games until the 2010–11 season)
- Picked by: Los Angeles Clippers

Regular season
- Top seed: Cleveland Cavaliers
- Season MVP: LeBron James (Cleveland Cavaliers)
- Top scorer: Kevin Durant (Oklahoma City)

Playoffs
- Eastern champions: Boston Celtics
- Eastern runners-up: Orlando Magic
- Western champions: Los Angeles Lakers
- Western runners-up: Phoenix Suns

Finals
- Champions: Los Angeles Lakers
- Runners-up: Boston Celtics
- Finals MVP: Kobe Bryant (L.A. Lakers)

NBA seasons
- ← 2008–09 2010–11 →

The 2009–10 NBA season was the 64th season of the National Basketball Association (NBA). The 1,230-game regular season (82 games for each of the 30 teams) began on October 27, 2009, and ended on April 14, 2010. The season ended with the Los Angeles Lakers defeating the Boston Celtics four games to three to win their second consecutive NBA championship in the 2010 NBA Finals.

The 2009 NBA draft was held on June 25, 2009, and Blake Griffin was selected first overall by the Los Angeles Clippers. The Dallas Mavericks hosted the 59th Annual All-Star Game at Cowboys Stadium in Arlington, Texas, on February 14, 2010.

For the second time in NBA history, all eight Western Conference playoff teams won at least 50 games, and only 7 wins separated the Western Conference No. 1 seed from No. 8 seed. Both of these events first occurred in 2008.

Cleveland's league-leading 61 wins was the lowest win total to lead the league since the Indiana Pacers won 61 games in 2003–04.

The New Jersey Nets became the fifth team in NBA history to lose 70 games in a season.

== Transactions ==
=== Coaching changes ===
Coaching changes
Off-season
Team	2008–09 coach	2009–10 coach
Washington Wizards	Ed Tapscott	Flip Saunders
Sacramento Kings	Kenny Natt	Paul Westphal
Philadelphia 76ers	Tony DiLeo	Eddie Jordan
Minnesota Timberwolves	Kevin McHale	Kurt Rambis
Detroit Pistons	Michael Curry	John Kuester
In-season
Team	Outgoing coach	New coach
New Orleans Hornets	Byron Scott	Jeff Bower
New Jersey Nets	Lawrence Frank	Tom Barrise
New Jersey Nets	Tom Barrise	Kiki Vandeweghe
Los Angeles Clippers	Mike Dunleavy	Kim Hughes

==== Off-season ====
- On April 22, the Washington Wizards hired Flip Saunders as head coach, replacing interim head coach Ed Tapscott.
- On April 24, the Sacramento Kings fired interim head coach Kenny Natt and four assistant coaches after the Kings finished with a season-low 17 wins.
- On May 11, the Philadelphia 76ers' interim head coach Tony DiLeo decided to withdraw his name from consideration as head coach for the 2009–10 season, citing family concerns. DiLeo retains his old position as the assistant general manager and senior vice president.
- On June 1, the Philadelphia 76ers hired Eddie Jordan as head coach.
- On June 9, the Sacramento Kings hired Paul Westphal as head coach.
- On June 17, the Minnesota Timberwolves fired interim head coach Kevin McHale, ending McHale's 15-year association with the franchise.
- On June 30, the Detroit Pistons fired head coach Michael Curry, after only one season at the position.
- On July 9, the Detroit Pistons hired Cavaliers assistant coach John Kuester as head coach.
- On August 10, the Minnesota Timberwolves hired Lakers assistant coach Kurt Rambis as head coach.

==== In-season ====
- On November 12, the New Orleans Hornets fired Byron Scott as head coach, replacing him on an interim basis with general manager Jeff Bower.
- On November 29, the New Jersey Nets fired Lawrence Frank as head coach, replacing him on an interim basis with assistant coach Tom Barrise.
- On December 1, the New Jersey Nets appointed general manager Kiki Vandeweghe as an interim head coach, replacing Tom Barrise who coached the team for two games after Lawrence Frank was fired.
- On February 4, Los Angeles Clippers head coach Mike Dunleavy stepped down from coaching duties. He retained his position as the team's general manager (he was fired on March 9). Assistant coach Kim Hughes replaced him as head coach on interim basis.

== Notable occurrences ==
June

- On June 10, 2009, one-time All-Star Game MVP Randy Smith died at the age of 60.
- On June 25, 2009, the 2009 NBA draft was held at the Madison Square Garden, New York City. Blake Griffin was selected first overall by the Los Angeles Clippers.

July

- On July 7, 2009, the NBA announced that the salary cap for the 2009–10 season would be $57.70 million and would go into effect on July 8.

September

- On September 1, 2009, the five-year contract between the NBA and its referees expired. Both parties had failed to negotiate a new contract by the start of the pre-season, resulting in a lockout by the National Basketball Referees Association (NBRA) starting on September 18.
- On September 5, 2009, three-time NBA champion Bruce Bowen retired after 12 seasons in the NBA, at the age of 38.
- On September 11, 2009, Charlotte Hornets co-owner William Beck died in a plane crash, at the age of 49.
- On September 11, 2009, NBA legends Michael Jordan, John Stockton and David Robinson along with Utah Jazz coach Jerry Sloan were inducted to the Naismith Memorial Basketball Hall of Fame.
- On September 16, 2009, Indiana Pacers co-owner Melvin Simon died at the age of 82.
- On September 24, 2009, Mikhail Prokhorov, who at the time was Russia's richest man according to Forbes magazine, reached a deal to become the majority owner of the New Jersey Nets and to fund nearly half the cost of building the Nets' new arena.
- On September 30, 2009, the NBA issued a policy regarding Twitter and other social media sites, banning players, coaches and other team basketball operations personnel from using them during games.

October

- On October 1, the pre-season games started and were refereed by replacement referees from the Women's National Basketball Association (WNBA) and the NBA D-League due to the lockout of referees. This marked the first time that replacement referees were used in the NBA since the 1995–96 season.
- On October 2, the NBA board of governors approved the expanded use of instant replay starting this season to determine whether a 24-second shot clock violation occurred during a play, and to determine during the last two minutes of regulation play or any overtime period which player last touched the ball prior to it going out-of-bounds.
- On October 8, the NBA played its first-ever game in Taipei. A pre-season game between the Indiana Pacers and the Denver Nuggets was played at Taipei Arena. Taipei became the seventh Asian city to host an NBA game, after Beijing, Guangzhou, Macau, Shanghai, Tokyo and Yokohama.
- On October 9, Marvin Fishman, one of the original owners of the Milwaukee Bucks, died at the age of 84.
- On October 23, the NBA and its referees announced that they have agreed on a new labor agreement for the next two seasons, thus ending the lockout of referees.

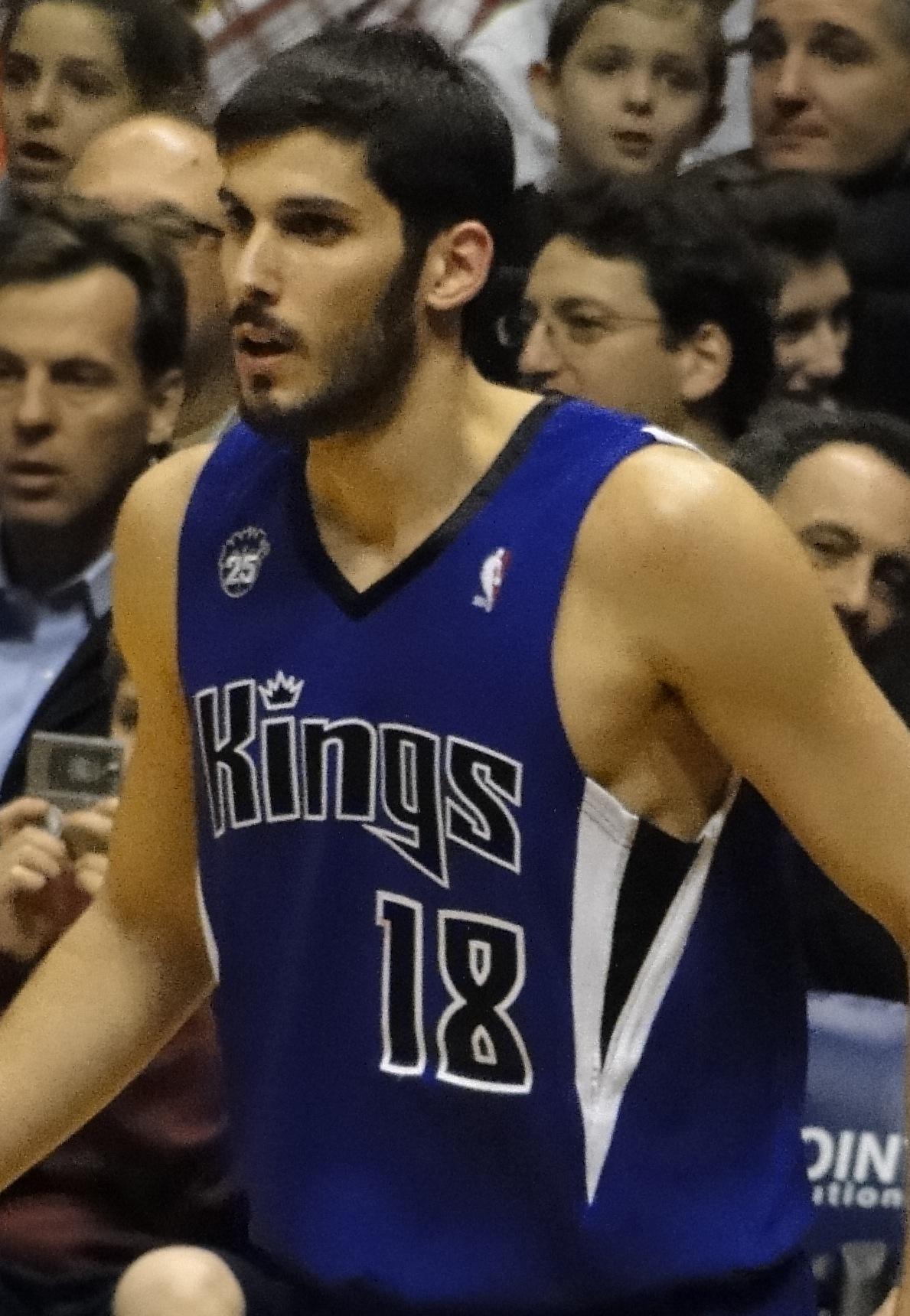
Israeli Omri Casspi

- On October 27, the regular season opened with a record of 83 international players on the opening night rosters, tying the records set in the 2006–07 season. Israeli Omri Casspi, Swede Jonas Jerebko and Tanzanian Hasheem Thabeet were representing their countries for the first time in the NBA. The opening night rosters also featured a record number of former D-League players with 63 players on 29 NBA teams.

November

- On November 10, Hall of Famer coach Al Cervi died at the age of 92.
- On November 24, Washington Wizards owner Abe Pollin died at the age of 85.
- On November 25, ten-time All-Star Allen Iverson announced his retirement from the NBA. He was waived by the Memphis Grizzlies on November 19 after playing three games.

January

- On January 6, Washington Wizards guard Gilbert Arenas was suspended indefinitely, pending further investigation of his admission of bringing guns to the Wizards' locker room. Reports said that Arenas brought his gun because of a dispute with teammate Javaris Crittenton over a gambling debt. Arenas was later charged with carrying a gun without a license and pleaded guilty to the charge.
- On January 9, Detroit Pistons guard Ben Gordon scored the 10 millionth point in NBA regular season history.
- On January 24, JamesOn Curry played 3.9 seconds for a game with the Los Angeles Clippers against the Washington Wizards, recording no stats or ball touches, and was waived the next day, which set the record for shortest professional career in NBA history in terms of playing time.
- On January 27, the NBA suspended Washington Wizards guards Gilbert Arenas and Javaris Crittenton for the rest of the season. Both Arenas and Crittenton brought guns into the team's locker room at Verizon Center, a violation of both the league's constitution and of the city's laws requiring any guns in the city be licensed in Washington and kept in the home. A few days earlier, Crittenton was also charged with, and pleaded guilty to, a misdemeanor count of possession of an unregistered firearm.

February

- On February 3, Hall of Famer Dick McGuire died of natural causes at age 84.

NBA All-Star Break

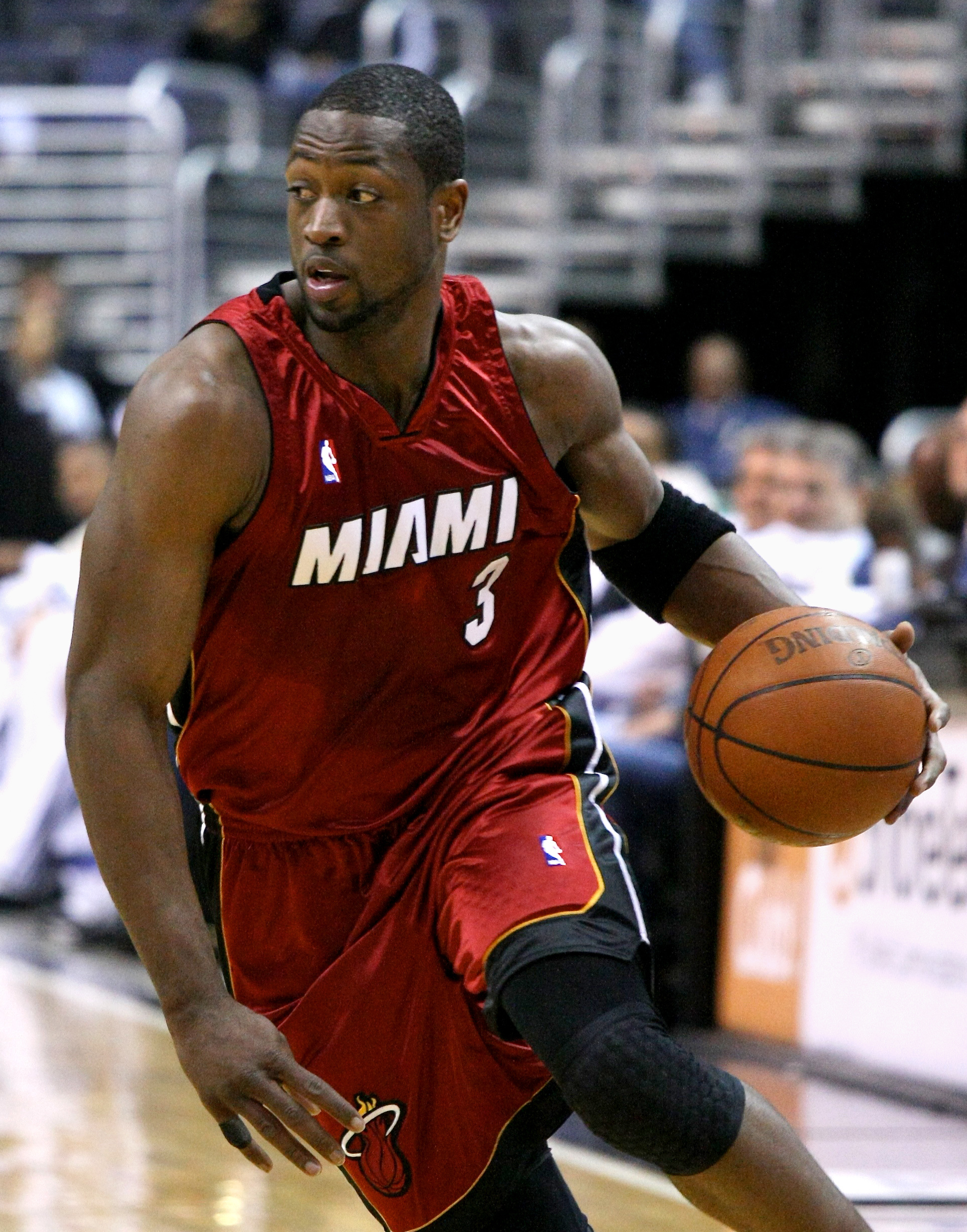
Dwyane Wade

The 2010 NBA All-Star Game was played at Cowboys Stadium, in Texas, on February 14, 2010, with the East winning in a closely contested game, 141–139, and the Miami Heat's Dwyane Wade being named the MVP. The game had record-breaking attendance, with 108,713. In the Rookie Challenge game, the Rookies defeated the Sophomores. Tyreke Evans was named the game's MVP. This is the first time the Rookies won the Rookie Challenge since 2002. During the NBA All-Star Weekend, Nate Robinson of the New York Knicks won the Sprite Slam Dunk Contest for the third time in his career; Kevin Durant, who also won the inaugural event, won this year's H.O.R.S.E Competition and Boston's Paul Pierce beat rookie Stephen Curry to win the Three-Point Shootout. Steve Nash won the Skills Challenge for the second time in his career. Team Texas, which represented Dallas, Houston and San Antonio, won the Shooting Stars Competition. In a miscellaneous note, Dwight Howard of the Orlando Magic set a Guinness World Record for the longest basketball shot while sitting down, at 52 ft 6 in, during Jam Session.

- On February 25, the second overall draft pick in the 2009 draft, Hasheem Thabeet, was assigned to NBA D-League team Dakota Wizards, becoming the highest drafted player to play in the D-League.
- On February 27, Five-time All-Star Carl Braun died of natural causes at the age of 82.
- On February 27, Michael Jordan reached a deal to become the majority owner of the Bobcats. Jordan had been a part-owner of the Bobcats with the final say on all basketball decisions since 2006.

March

- On March 9, Mike Dunleavy was fired as Clippers General Manager.
- On March 13, the Washington Wizards become the first team in 10 years to play 3 games on 3 consecutive nights. The scheduling was caused by a February blizzard that postponed a game.

April

- On April 5, the Naismith Memorial Basketball Hall of Fame announced the members of the Class of 2010 inductees. Four former NBA players, Dennis Johnson, Gus Johnson, Karl Malone and Scottie Pippen were named among the players to be inducted in the Enshrinement Ceremony on August 13. Los Angeles Lakers owner Jerry Buss was named among the contributors to be inducted. The United States national basketball team that won the gold medal in the 1992 Olympic Games was named among the teams to be inducted. The team, dubbed "The Dream Team", was the first team made up primarily of NBA players. Prior to the FIBA rules change in 1989, NBA players were not eligible to compete in international basketball.
- On April 12, the New Jersey Nets played their final game at the Izod Center, a 105–95 loss to the Charlotte Bobcats. The Nets, who have played at the Izod Center since 1981, would move to the Prudential Center for the next two seasons before finally moving to the Barclays Center in Brooklyn, New York, in 2012.
- On April 14, the Orlando Magic played their final regular season game at the Amway Arena, a 125–111 win over the Philadelphia 76ers. The Magic, who have played at the Amway Arena since their inaugural season in 1989, moved to the Amway Center next season.

== Records set ==
=== Individual ===
- October 27: League record. Cleveland Cavaliers forward LeBron James became the youngest player to record 13,000 career points.
- November 6: League record. Los Angeles Lakers guard Kobe Bryant became the youngest player to record 24,000 career points.
- November 14: Milwaukee Bucks franchise record. Milwaukee Bucks rookie Brandon Jennings scored 55 points bettering the Bucks rookie scoring record previously set by Kareem Abdul-Jabbar on February 21, 1970, by four points. He also became the youngest player in NBA history to score more than 50 points in a game. He fell just two points short of the franchise scoring record set by Michael Redd on November 11, 2006. He also fell just three points short of the NBA record for points by a rookie set twice in 1960 by Wilt Chamberlain.
- November 25: League record. Dallas Mavericks guard Jason Kidd moved into second place on NBA's career assists list. Kidd recorded seven assists on the night to bring his career assists total to 10,337 assists, overtaking Mark Jackson who recorded 10,334 assists.
- December 2: Cleveland Cavaliers franchise record. Center Žydrūnas Ilgauskas played his 724th game with the Cavaliers to set the franchise record for most games played. He broke the old record of 723 games held by Danny Ferry.
- January 2: Oklahoma City Thunder franchise record. Forward Kevin Durant scored more than 30 points in his seventh consecutive game, breaking the franchise record set by Spencer Haywood in January 1972.
- January 2: League record. Cleveland Cavaliers forward LeBron James became the youngest player to score 14,000 career points.
- January 3: Toronto Raptors franchise record. Forward Chris Bosh became the leading scorer in Raptors' franchise history, surpassing Vince Carter's previous franchise record of 9,420 points. Bosh scored 22 points on the night to bring his franchise point total to 9,428 points.
- January 13: League record. Dallas Mavericks forward Dirk Nowitzki became the first European-born player to score 20,000 career points.
- January 13: Minnesota Timberwolves franchise record. Center Al Jefferson set a single-game franchise record with 26 rebounds in a triple overtime loss to the Houston Rockets.
- January 16: Miami Heat franchise record. Guard Dwyane Wade became the Heat's career leader in assists, surpassing Tim Hardaway's previous franchise record of 2,867 assists.
- January 21: League record. Los Angeles Lakers guard Kobe Bryant became the youngest player to score 25,000 career points.
- February 1: Los Angeles Lakers franchise record. Guard Kobe Bryant became the leading scorer in Lakers' franchise history, surpassing Jerry West's previous franchise record of 25,192 points. Bryant scored 44 points on the night to bring his franchise point total to 25,208 points, 14th on the NBA's all-time scoring list.
- February 2: League record. Atlanta Hawks forward Josh Smith became the youngest player to record 1,000 career blocks.
- February 20: Chicago Bulls franchise record. Guard Kirk Hinrich recorded his 771st three-point field goal. Breaking the franchise record of 770 by Ben Gordon
- February 26: Orlando Magic franchise record. Center Dwight Howard recorded his 20th straight double-double, breaking the franchise record of 19 straight double-double set by Shaquille O'Neal.
- March 5: Cleveland Cavaliers franchise record. Forward LeBron James became the franchise's all-time leader in minutes played with 21,573 in the Cavaliers' game against the Detroit Pistons, surpassing previous franchise leader Žydrūnas Ilgauskas.
- March 12: Oklahoma City Thunder franchise record. Forward Kevin Durant had his 36th game with 30 or more points this season, breaking the franchise record set by Spencer Haywood in the 1972–73 season.
- March 17: Toronto Raptors franchise record. Forward Chris Bosh becomes the first Raptor to score 10,000 points.
- March 19: League record. Cleveland Cavaliers forward LeBron James became the youngest player to record 15,000 career points.
- March 26: Boston Celtics franchise record. Guard Rajon Rondo set the Celtics single-season steals record, passing Rick Fox. Paul Pierce set the all-time franchise record for free throws made, passing John Havlicek.
- April 7: League record. Golden State Warriors head coach Don Nelson became the NBA's all-time most-wins coach, passing Lenny Wilkens' previous record of 1,332 wins.
- April 14: League record. Kevin Durant became the youngest scoring leader at the age of 21. Durant, who averaged 30.1 points per game, surpassed Max Zaslofsky who was the scoring leader in the 1947–48 BAA at the age of 22.
- April 14: League record. Dwight Howard led the league in both rebounding and blocked shots. He became the only player to lead the league in blocks and rebounding in the same season twice, which he did consecutively.
- April 14: League record. Utah Jazz guard-forward Kyle Korver set the record for the highest three-point field goal percentage in a season when he shot 53.6%, breaking Steve Kerr's record of 52.4% in the 1994–95 season.

=== Team ===
- December 2: Worst winless start of season. The New Jersey Nets lost to extend their losing streak to 18 since the start of the season. This set the record for the NBA's all-time worst winless start. The Nets broke the old record of 17 games, previously held by both the 1988–89 Miami Heat, who were in their first season, and the 1998–99 Los Angeles Clippers, who were resuming play after a league-wide lockout.
- December 17: Most three-point field goal attempts in a half. The New York Knicks attempted 29 three-point shots in the first half of a game at the Chicago Bulls, setting the NBA record for three-point attempts in a half.
- December 21: Largest deficit overcome. The Sacramento Kings overcame a 35-point deficit to defeat the Chicago Bulls. This was the second largest deficit overcome in NBA history. The score was Sacramento 44, Chicago 79 with 8:50 remaining in the third quarter, whereupon the Kings rallied with a 58–19 run for the remainder of the game to win in regulation time. The final score was Sacramento 102, Chicago 98. The NBA record for this feat took place on November 27, 1996, when the Utah Jazz overcame a 36-point deficit to defeat the Denver Nuggets in regulation by a final score of Utah 107, Denver 103. The Jazz achieved this feat as the home team, while the Kings achieved it as the visiting team.
- December 23: Fewest points scored in overtime. The Sacramento Kings failed to score in the overtime period in a game against the Cleveland Cavaliers, becoming the ninth team in NBA history to score zero points in overtime.
- December 26: Worst 30-game start of season. The New Jersey Nets became the sixth team in NBA history to lose 28 of its first 30 games, joining the 1970–71 Cleveland Cavaliers, 1992–93 Dallas Mavericks, 1993–94 Dallas Mavericks, 1997–98 Denver Nuggets, and 2004–05 New Orleans Hornets.
- January 13: First franchise to 3,000 wins. The Los Angeles Lakers defeated the Dallas Mavericks at Dallas to record the three thousandth regular season victory in franchise history. In the process, the Lakers became the first franchise in NBA history to win three thousand games.
- January 23: Worst 3-win start of season. The New Jersey Nets became the third team in NBA history to lose 40 of its first 43 games, tying the 1993–94 Dallas Mavericks and 1997–98 Denver Nuggets for the worst start to a season with three wins.
- January 24: Largest win in franchise history. The Dallas Mavericks defeated the New York Knicks 128–78 at New York. The 50-point deficit is the Mavericks largest win in franchise history. For the Knicks, it was the worst home loss and the second worst loss in franchise history.
- January 29: First team to win five consecutive games over opponents over .500 on the road. The Chicago Bulls became the first team in NBA history to win five consecutive games over opponents over .500 on the road.
- January 31: Most three-point field goals in a quarter. The Cleveland Cavaliers made eleven three-point shots in the first quarter of a game against the Los Angeles Clippers. This tied the NBA record set by the Milwaukee Bucks against the Phoenix Suns on March 28, 2006.
- February 6: Worst 50-game start of season. The New Jersey Nets became the third team in NBA history to lose 46 of its first 50 games, joining the 1972–73 Philadelphia 76ers and 1992–93 Dallas Mavericks.
- March 6: Most three-point field goal attempt without making one. The New York Knicks attempted 18 three-point shots without making one in a game against the New Jersey Nets. This surpassed the previous league record of 16 set by the Washington Wizards on November 2, 2007.
- March 22: Worst 70-game start of season. The New Jersey Nets became the second team in NBA history to lose 63 of its first 70 games, joining the 1992–93 Dallas Mavericks.
- April 14: Most three-point field goal made in a season. The Orlando Magic broke the record for most three-point field goals made in a season when Vince Carter scored the Magic's eight three-pointer in the game against the Philadelphia 76ers to surpass the previous record of 837 three-point field goals held by the Phoenix Suns in 2005–06. The Magic scored 11 three-point field goal in the game to bring their season total to 841.

== 2009–10 NBA changes ==
- Atlanta Hawks – added new red road alternate uniforms with dark navy blue side panels to their jerseys and shorts.
- Boston Celtics – TD Banknorth Garden in Boston, Massachusetts, was renamed to TD Garden due to TD Banknorth's merger with Commerce Bancorp to form TD Bank.
- Charlotte Bobcats – slightly changed their pinstripe uniforms.
- Dallas Mavericks – added new light blue road alternate uniforms with dark navy blue side panels to their jerseys and shorts.
- Houston Rockets – added new red road alternate uniforms with gold side panels to their jerseys and shorts.
- Memphis Grizzlies – added new grey road alternate uniforms with dark navy blue side panels to their jerseys and shorts.
- New Jersey Nets – red road alternate uniforms they wore for the past three seasons became their primary road jersey.
- Portland Trail Blazers – added new white home alternate uniforms added "Rip City" on their wordmark to their jersey.
- Philadelphia 76ers – added new logo and new uniforms, brought back original red, white and blue colors replacing black and gold, added side panels to their jerseys and shorts.

== Standings ==
=== By division ===
Eastern Conference

Atlantic Division	W	L	PCT	GB	Home	Road	Div
y-Boston Celtics	50	32	.610	–	24–17	26–15	13–3
Toronto Raptors	40	42	.488	10	25–16	15–26	11–5
New York Knicks	29	53	.354	21	18–23	11–30	6–10
Philadelphia 76ers	27	55	.329	23	12–29	15–26	7–9
New Jersey Nets	12	70	.146	38	8–33	4–37	3–13

Central Division	W	L	PCT	GB	Home	Road	Div
z-Cleveland Cavaliers	61	21	.744	–	35–6	26–15	12–4
x-Milwaukee Bucks	46	36	.561	15	28–13	18–23	10–6
x-Chicago Bulls	41	41	.500	20	24–17	17–24	10–6
Indiana Pacers	32	50	.390	29	23–18	9–32	6–10
Detroit Pistons	27	55	.329	34	17–24	10–31	2–14

Southeast Division	W	L	PCT	GB	Home	Road	Div
y-Orlando Magic	59	23	.720	–	34–7	25–16	10–6
x-Atlanta Hawks	53	29	.646	6	34–7	19–22	8–8
x-Miami Heat	47	35	.573	12	24–17	23–18	9–7
x-Charlotte Bobcats	44	38	.537	15	31–10	13–28	10–6
Washington Wizards	26	56	.317	33	15–26	11–30	3–13

Western Conference

Northwest Division	W	L	PCT	GB	Home	Road	Div
y-Denver Nuggets	53	29	.646	–	34–7	19–22	12–4
x-Utah Jazz	53	29	.646	–	32–9	21–20	8–8
x-Portland Trail Blazers	50	32	.610	3	26–15	24–17	8–8
x-Oklahoma City Thunder	50	32	.610	3	27–14	23–18	9–7
Minnesota Timberwolves	15	67	.183	38	10–31	5–36	3–13

Pacific Division	W	L	PCT	GB	Home	Road	Div
c-Los Angeles Lakers	57	25	.695	–	34–7	23–18	13–3
x-Phoenix Suns	54	28	.659	3	32–9	22–19	12–4
Los Angeles Clippers	29	53	.354	28	21–20	8–33	5–11
Golden State Warriors	26	56	.317	31	18–23	8–33	5–11
Sacramento Kings	25	57	.305	32	18–23	7–34	5–11

Southwest Division	W	L	PCT	GB	Home	Road	Div
y-Dallas Mavericks	55	27	.671	–	28–13	27–14	10–6
x-San Antonio Spurs	50	32	.610	5	29–12	21–20	9–7
Houston Rockets	42	40	.512	13	23–18	19–22	9–7
Memphis Grizzlies	40	42	.488	15	23–18	17–24	5–11
New Orleans Hornets	37	45	.451	18	24–17	13–28	7–9

=== By conference ===
#	Eastern Conference				
#	Team	W	L	PCT	GB
1	z-Cleveland Cavaliers	61	21	.744	–
2	y-Orlando Magic	59	23	.720	2
3	x-Atlanta Hawks	53	29	.646	8
4	y-Boston Celtics	50	32	.610	11
5	x-Miami Heat	47	35	.573	14
6	x-Milwaukee Bucks	46	36	.561	15
7	x-Charlotte Bobcats	44	38	.537	17
8	x-Chicago Bulls	41	41	.500	20
9	Toronto Raptors	40	42	.488	21
10	Indiana Pacers	32	50	.390	29
11	New York Knicks	29	53	.354	32
12	Philadelphia 76ers	27	55	.329	34
13	Detroit Pistons	27	55	.329	34
14	Washington Wizards	26	56	.317	35
15	New Jersey Nets	12	70	.146	49

Tiebreakers

- Detroit finished ahead of Philadelphia by virtue of winning their regular season series 3–1.

#	Western Conference				
#	Team	W	L	PCT	GB
1	c-Los Angeles Lakers	57	25	.695	–
2	y-Dallas Mavericks	55	27	.671	2
3	x-Phoenix Suns	54	28	.659	3
4	y-Denver Nuggets	53	29	.646	4
5	x-Utah Jazz	53	29	.646	4
6	x-Portland Trail Blazers	50	32	.610	7
7	x-San Antonio Spurs	50	32	.610	7
8	x-Oklahoma City Thunder	50	32	.610	7
9	Houston Rockets	42	40	.512	15
10	Memphis Grizzlies	40	42	.488	17
11	New Orleans Hornets	37	45	.451	20
12	Los Angeles Clippers	29	53	.354	28
13	Golden State Warriors	26	56	.317	31
14	Sacramento Kings	25	57	.305	32
15	Minnesota Timberwolves	15	67	.183	42

Tiebreakers

- Denver finished ahead of Utah and became the Northwest Division winner by virtue of winning their regular season series 3–1.
- Portland finished ahead of San Antonio and Oklahoma City while San Antonio finished ahead of Oklahoma City by virtue of better winning records among the teams tied (Portland had a 6–1 record against the tied teams, San Antonio had a 3–4 record and Oklahoma City had a 2–6 record).

Notes

- z – clinched home court advantage for the entire playoffs
- c – clinched home court advantage for the conference playoffs
- y – clinched division title
- x – clinched playoff spot

== Playoffs ==
Teams in bold advanced to the next round. The numbers to the left of each team indicate the team's seeding in its conference, and the numbers to the right indicate the number of games the team won in that round. The division champions are marked by an asterisk. Home court advantage does not necessarily belong to the higher-seeded team, but instead the team with the better regular season record; teams enjoying the home advantage are shown in italics.

First Round	Conference Semifinals
**E1**	**Cleveland***	**4**
E8	Chicago	1
E1	Cleveland*	2
**E4**	**Boston***	**4**
**E4**	**Boston***	**4**
E5	Miami	1
**Eastern Conference**
**E3**	**Atlanta**	**4**
E6	Milwaukee	3
E3	Atlanta	0
**E2**	**Orlando***	**4**
**E2**	**Orlando***	**4**
E7	Charlotte	0
**W1**	**LA Lakers***	**4**
W8	Oklahoma City	2
**W1**	**LA Lakers***	**4**
W5	Utah	0
W4	Denver*	2
**W5**	**Utah**	**4**
**Western Conference**
**W3**	**Phoenix**	**4**
W6	Portland	2
**W3**	**Phoenix**	**4**
W7	San Antonio	0
W2	Dallas*	2
**W7**	**San Antonio**	**4**

Conference Finals
**E4**	**Boston***	**4**
E2	Orlando*	2
**W1**	**LA Lakers***	**4**
W3	Phoenix	2

NBA Finals
E4	Boston*	3
**W1**	**LA Lakers***	**4**

- * Division winner
- **Bold** Series winner
- Italic Team with home-court advantage

== Statistics leaders ==
Category	Player	Team	Statistics
Points per game	Kevin Durant	Oklahoma City Thunder	30.1
Rebounds per game	Dwight Howard	Orlando Magic	13.2
Assists per game	Steve Nash	Phoenix Suns	11.0
Steals per game	Rajon Rondo	Boston Celtics	2.33
Blocks per game	Dwight Howard	Orlando Magic	2.78
Field goal percentage	Dwight Howard	Orlando Magic	.612
3-point field goal percentage	Kyle Korver	Utah Jazz	.536
Free throw percentage	Steve Nash	Phoenix Suns	.938

== Awards ==
=== Yearly awards ===
- Most Valuable Player: LeBron James, Cleveland Cavaliers
- Defensive Player of the Year: Dwight Howard, Orlando Magic
- Rookie of the Year: Tyreke Evans, Sacramento Kings
- Sixth Man of the Year: Jamal Crawford, Atlanta Hawks
- Most Improved Player: Aaron Brooks, Houston Rockets
- Coach of the Year: Scott Brooks, Oklahoma City Thunder
- Executive of the Year: John Hammond, Milwaukee Bucks
- Sportsmanship Award: Grant Hill, Phoenix Suns
- J. Walter Kennedy Citizenship Award: Samuel Dalembert, Philadelphia 76ers

- All-NBA First Team:
  - F Kevin Durant, Oklahoma City Thunder
  - F LeBron James, Cleveland Cavaliers
  - C Dwight Howard, Orlando Magic
  - G Kobe Bryant, Los Angeles Lakers
  - G Dwyane Wade, Miami Heat
- NBA All-Defensive First Team:
  - Dwight Howard, Orlando Magic
  - Rajon Rondo, Boston Celtics
  - LeBron James, Cleveland Cavaliers
  - Kobe Bryant, Los Angeles Lakers
  - Gerald Wallace, Charlotte Bobcats
- NBA All-Rookie First Team:
  - Tyreke Evans, Sacramento Kings
  - Brandon Jennings, Milwaukee Bucks
  - Stephen Curry, Golden State Warriors
  - Darren Collison, New Orleans Hornets
  - Taj Gibson, Chicago Bulls
- All-NBA Second Team:
  - F Carmelo Anthony, Denver Nuggets
  - F Dirk Nowitzki, Dallas Mavericks
  - C Amar'e Stoudemire, Phoenix Suns
  - G Deron Williams, Utah Jazz
  - G Steve Nash, Phoenix Suns
- NBA All-Defensive Second Team:
  - Tim Duncan, San Antonio Spurs
  - Dwyane Wade, Miami Heat
  - Josh Smith, Atlanta Hawks
  - Anderson Varejão, Cleveland Cavaliers
  - Thabo Sefolosha, Oklahoma City Thunder
- NBA All-Rookie Second Team:
  - Marcus Thornton, New Orleans Hornets
  - DeJuan Blair, San Antonio Spurs
  - James Harden, Oklahoma City Thunder
  - Jonny Flynn, Minnesota Timberwolves
  - Jonas Jerebko, Detroit Pistons
- All-NBA Third Team:
  - F Pau Gasol, Los Angeles Lakers
  - F Tim Duncan, San Antonio Spurs
  - C Andrew Bogut, Milwaukee Bucks
  - G Joe Johnson, Atlanta Hawks
  - G Brandon Roy, Portland Trail Blazers

=== Players of the week ===
The following players were named the Eastern and Western Conference Players of the Week.

Week	Eastern Conference	Western Conference	Ref.
Oct. 27 – Nov. 1	Dwight Howard (Orlando Magic) (1/4)	Carmelo Anthony (Denver Nuggets) (1/2)	
Nov. 2 – Nov. 8	Joe Johnson (Atlanta Hawks) (1/1)	Chris Kaman (Los Angeles Clippers) (1/2)	
Nov. 9 – Nov. 15	Brandon Jennings (Milwaukee Bucks) (1/1)	Dirk Nowitzki (Dallas Mavericks) (1/4)	
Nov. 16 – Nov. 22	LeBron James (Cleveland Cavaliers) (1/6)	Kobe Bryant (Los Angeles Lakers) (2/4)	
Nov. 23 – Nov. 29	Gerald Wallace (Charlotte Bobcats) (1/1)	Tim Duncan (San Antonio Spurs) (1/1)	
Nov. 30 – Dec. 6	Kevin Garnett (Boston Celtics) (1/1)	Carlos Boozer (Utah Jazz) (1/2)	
Dec. 7 – Dec. 13	Rodney Stuckey (Detroit Pistons) (1/1)	Deron Williams (Utah Jazz) (1/1)	
Dec. 14 – Dec. 20	Dwight Howard (Orlando Magic) (2/4)	Kobe Bryant (Los Angeles Lakers) (3/4)	
Dec. 21 – Dec. 27	LeBron James (Cleveland Cavaliers) (2/6)	Kobe Bryant (Los Angeles Lakers) (4/4)	
Dec. 28 – Jan. 3	Derrick Rose (Chicago Bulls) (1/1)	Kevin Durant (Oklahoma City Thunder) (1/3)	
Jan. 4 – Jan. 10	LeBron James (Cleveland Cavaliers) (3/6)	Chris Kaman (Los Angeles Clippers) (2/2)	
Jan. 11 – Jan. 17	Stephen Jackson (Charlotte Bobcats) (1/1)	Carmelo Anthony (Denver Nuggets) (2/2)	
Jan. 18 – Jan. 24	LeBron James (Cleveland Cavaliers) (4/6)	Chauncey Billups (Denver Nuggets) (1/1)	
Jan. 25 – Jan. 31	Chris Bosh (Toronto Raptors) (1/2)	Kevin Durant (Oklahoma City Thunder) (2/3)	
Feb. 1 – Feb. 7	LeBron James (Cleveland Cavaliers) (5/6)	Russell Westbrook (Oklahoma City Thunder) (1/1)	
Feb. 15 – Feb. 21	Dwight Howard (Orlando Magic) (3/4)	Carlos Boozer (Utah Jazz) (2/2)	
Feb. 22 – Feb. 28	LeBron James (Cleveland Cavaliers) (6/6)	Dirk Nowitzki (Dallas Mavericks) (1/3)	
Mar. 1 – Mar. 7	Dwyane Wade (Miami Heat) (1/2)	Dirk Nowitzki (Dallas Mavericks) (2/3)	
Mar. 8 – Mar. 14	Andrew Bogut (Milwaukee Bucks) (1/1)	Brandon Roy (Portland Trail Blazers) (1/1)	
Mar. 15 – Mar. 21	Paul Pierce (Boston Celtics) (1/1)	Pau Gasol (Los Angeles Lakers) (1/1)	
Mar. 22 – Mar. 28	Dwyane Wade (Miami Heat) (2/2)	Manu Ginóbili (San Antonio Spurs) (1/1)	
Mar. 29 – Apr. 4	Chris Bosh (Toronto Raptors) (2/2)	Kevin Durant (Oklahoma City Thunder) (3/3)	
Apr. 5 – Apr. 11	Dwight Howard (Orlando Magic) (4/4)	Dirk Nowitzki (Dallas Mavericks) (3/3)	

=== Players of the month ===
The following players were named the Eastern and Western Conference Players of the Month.

Month	Eastern Conference	Western Conference	Ref.
October – November	LeBron James (Cleveland Cavaliers) (1/4)	Carmelo Anthony (Denver Nuggets) (1/1)	
December	LeBron James (Cleveland Cavaliers) (2/4)	Kobe Bryant (Los Angeles Lakers) (1/1)	
January	LeBron James (Cleveland Cavaliers) (3/4)	Chris Paul (New Orleans Hornets) (1/1)	
February	LeBron James (Cleveland Cavaliers) (4/4)	Carlos Boozer (Utah Jazz) (1/1)	
March	Dwyane Wade (Miami Heat) (1/1)	Amar'e Stoudemire (Phoenix Suns) (1/1)	
April	Derrick Rose (Chicago Bulls) (1/1)	Kevin Durant (Oklahoma City Thunder) (1/1)	

=== Rookies of the month ===
The following players were named the Eastern and Western Conference Rookies of the Month.

Month	Eastern Conference	Western Conference	Ref.
October – November	Brandon Jennings (Milwaukee Bucks) (1/4)	Tyreke Evans (Sacramento Kings) (1/2)	
December	Brandon Jennings (Milwaukee Bucks) (2/4)	Tyreke Evans (Sacramento Kings) (2/2)	
January	Brandon Jennings (Milwaukee Bucks) (3/4)	Stephen Curry (Golden State Warriors) (1/3)	
February	Jonas Jerebko (Detroit Pistons) (1/1)	Darren Collison (New Orleans Hornets) (1/1)	
March	Brandon Jennings (Milwaukee Bucks) (4/4)	Stephen Curry (Golden State Warriors) (2/3)	
April	Terrence Williams (New Jersey Nets) (1/1)	Stephen Curry (Golden State Warriors) (3/3)	

=== Coaches of the month ===
The following coaches were named the Eastern and Western Conference Coaches of the Month.

Month	Eastern Conference	Western Conference	Ref.
October – November	Stan Van Gundy (Orlando Magic) (1/2)	Alvin Gentry (Phoenix Suns) (1/2)	
December	Mike Brown (Cleveland Cavaliers) (1/1)	Lionel Hollins (Memphis Grizzlies) (1/1)	
January	Larry Brown (Charlotte Bobcats) (1/1)	George Karl (Denver Nuggets) (1/1)	
February	Scott Skiles (Milwaukee Bucks) (1/1)	Scott Brooks (Oklahoma City Thunder) (1/1)	
March	Erik Spoelstra (Miami Heat) (1/1)	Alvin Gentry (Phoenix Suns) (2/2)	
April	Stan Van Gundy (Orlando Magic) (2/2)	Rick Carlisle (Dallas Mavericks) (1/1)	

== Salary cap ==
On July 7, 2009, the NBA announced that the salary cap for the 2009–10 season would be $57.70 million and would go into effect on July 8 as the league's "moratorium period" had ended and teams could begin signing free agents and making trades. The tax level for the season was set at $69.92 million, with each team paying a $1 tax for each $1 by which it exceeds $69.92 million. The mid-level exception was $5.854 million for the season and the minimum team salary, which was set at 75% of the salary cap, was $43.275 million.

For the 2008–09 season, the salary cap was set at $58.68 million (▼$0.98 million), while the tax level was $71.15 million (▼$1.23 million). Although the league-wide revenue increased by 2.5% in the previous season, the decrease in the salary cap and tax level was the result of the formula used to set the cap and tax under the terms of the collective bargaining agreement.

== Broadcast ==
The 2009–10 NBA season was broadcast in the United States by ABC, ESPN, TNT and NBA TV. A number of games were nationally televised by ABC, ESPN and TNT, while some games were televised by NBA TV. Four teams, the Minnesota Timberwolves, Houston Rockets, New Jersey Nets and Charlotte Bobcats had not have any national TV appearances on ABC, ESPN and TNT. ABC had air several Sunday games and a double-header on Christmas day. ESPN has mainly televised the regular season games on Wednesdays and Fridays, while TNT has mainly televised the Thursday games. TNT has also broadcast the 2010 NBA All-Star Game and the NBA All-Star Saturday Night Events in February.

== See also ==
- List of NBA regular season records
