= Nimrit Kaur Ahluwalia =

Indian actress (born 1994)

Nimrit Ahluwalia
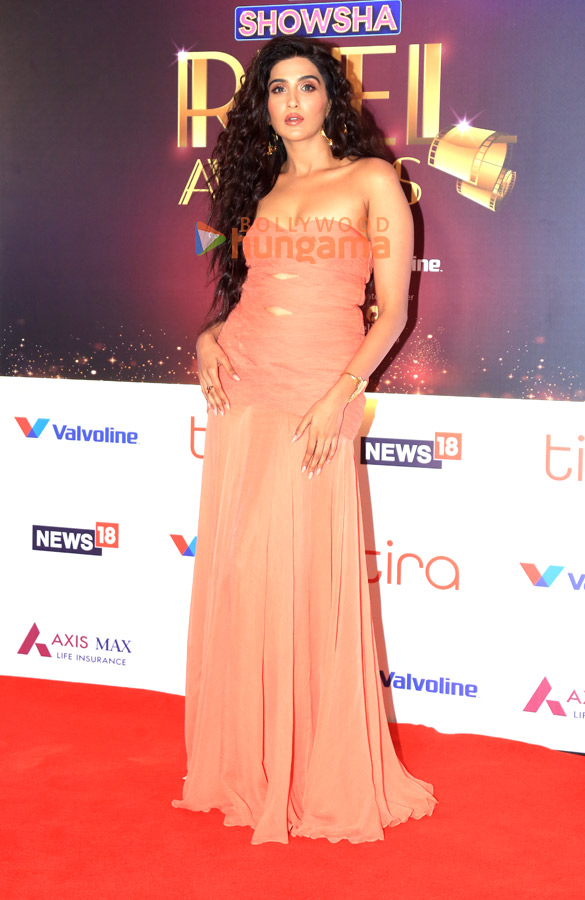
- Ahluwalia in 2025
- Born: 11 December 1994 (age 31); New Delhi, India
- Occupation: Actress
- Years active: 2018–present
- Known for: Choti Sarrdaarni; Bigg Boss 16
- Title: Femina Miss Manipur 2018

Nimrit Kaur Ahluwalia (born 11 December 1994), also known as Nimrit Ahluwalia, is an Indian actress who primarily works in Hindi television. She won the title of Femina Miss Manipur (2018) and was among the top 12 of Femina Miss India 2018. She made her acting debut in Choti Sarrdaarni and is also known for her participation in Bigg Boss 16 and Khatron Ke Khiladi 14.

== Early life ==
Ahluwalia was born on 11 December 1994 in New Delhi, India. During her education, she was bullied by classmates due to her weight, which affected her mental health.

== Career ==
After starting her career in modeling and winning the Femina Miss Manipur title in 2018, she featured in B Praak's music video Masstaani, which propelled her career in the entertainment industry.

Ahluwalia was featured in the 2018 educational film Who Said Boys Can't Wear Makeup? by Priyakanta Laishram.

In 2019, she appeared in the daily soap Choti Sarrdaarni, which proved to be a major breakout role in her career. Her portrayal of Meher Dhillon and Seher Gill made her a household name until the show ended in 2022. In 2021, she appeared in Bannet Dosanjh's music video titled Serious.

From 2022 to 2023, Ahluwalia participated in Colors TV's reality show Bigg Boss 16, where she was evicted in the finale week and finished at 6th place. In 2024, she participated as a contestant in Khatron Ke Khiladi 14.

Nimrit will be making her film debut with Punjabi film Shaunki Sardar opposite Guru Randhawa.

== Filmography ==
=== Films ===
Year	Title	Role	Language	Notes	Ref.
2025	Shaunki Sardar	Raunak	Punjabi		

=== Television ===
Year	Title	Role	Notes	Ref.
2019–2022	Choti Sarrdaarni	Meher Kaur Dhillon / Seher Kaur Gill		
2022–2023	Bigg Boss 16	Contestant	6th place	
2024	Khatron Ke Khiladi 14	Contestant	6th place	

=== Web series ===
Year	Title	Role	Notes	Ref.
2026	Ab Hoga Hisaab (Season 1 and 2)	Gazal		

=== Music videos ===
Year	Title	Singer(s)	Ref.
2018	Masstaani	B Praak and Jaani	
2019	Serious	Bannet Dosanjh	
2023	Zihaal-e-Miskin	Shreya Ghoshal and Vishal Mishra	
2023	Soniye	Tony Kakkar, Kamal Kahlon	
2023	Jaane Jaa	Stebin Ben, Asees Kaur	
2025	Bepanaah	Tiger Shroff	

== Awards and nominations ==
Year	Award	Category	Work	Result	Ref.
2021	Indian Television Academy Awards	Best Actress Drama Jury	Choti Sarrdaarni	Nominated	
2021	Iconic Gold Awards	Iconic Path Breaking Actress	Choti Sarrdaarni	Won	
2023	Indian Telly Awards	Fan Favorite Actress	Choti Sarrdaarni	Won	

Other honors

- Femina Miss Manipur (2018)
