= Salesian School, Chertsey =

Academy

Salesian School
- Salesian School crest

Location
- Guildford Road, Chertsey KT16 9LU; 51.3816°N 0.5185°W

Information
- Type: Academy
- Motto: Enlightening minds, uplifting hearts
- Established: 1919 (As Salesian College)
- Founders: Salesian Brothers
- Department for Education URN: 143367 Tables
- Ofsted: Reports
- Head teacher: Paul Gower
- Staff: >200
- Gender: Coeducational
- Age: 11 to 18
- Enrolment: 1849 (as of 2024)
- Houses: Mazzarello, Rinaldi, Rua, Savio, Zatti
- Website: www.salesian.surrey.sch.uk

Salesian School is a split-site Roman Catholic comprehensive secondary school in Chertsey, Surrey. The two sites were originally a pair of single-sex education Roman Catholic private schools maintained by the Salesian Fathers and Sisters. The Salesian College at Highfield Road (previously Salesian Sixth Form), founded in 1919, was for boys and the later Guildford Road school was for girls. In 1971 they merged to form one comprehensive school but still maintained single-sex education on separate sites.

In 1981 it became a coeducational school with pupils located on sites according to their age or subject taught. As of 2009, however, years 7 to 11 (aged 11–16 years) began to exclusively study at the larger Guildford Road, while the college (ages 16–18) remains at Highfield Road – the students currently following a two-week timetable.

== Staff ==
James Curran was headmaster until 1963, followed by Vincent Ford (1964–1967), Edward O'Shea (1967–1977), John Gilheney (1977–1990), David Cleworth (1990–2005), Eric Doherty (2005–2006) and James Kibble (2006-2022). In September 2022, Paul Gower took on the post of head teacher. Currently, there are over 200 members of staff, either working as teachers, learning and teaching assistants or associate staff.

A former member of staff was Sean Devereux, the Salesian missionary and aid worker murdered in Kismayo, Somalia in 1993 while working for UNICEF, who taught physical education at Salesian School from 1986 to 1988. The Devereux building which contains the Geography and English departments is named after him.

Conspiracy of Faith, a book published in 2007 by Graham Wilmer MBE, recounts Wilmer's experience of being sexually abused as a child by a teacher at the then Salesian College in Chertsey in the late 1960s.

== Ofsted ==
Following a two-day inspection, on 26 November 2024, Ofsted published its most recent report on the school, declaring it to be outstanding in all five categories of inspection.

== Partnerships ==
From December 2010 to August 2011, head teacher James Kibble worked as interim executive head for St John Bosco College, London, while overseeing the winding down of two schools: Salesian College (London) and John Paul II School in Wimbledon. In this capacity he worked with a range of stakeholders and appointed the new school's first head teacher. In March 2013, an Ofsted inspection judged the new school to be 'good'.

In May 2012, a neighbouring school, Jubilee High, Addlestone, was given a 'notice to improve' by Ofsted and the head teacher resigned. Salesian head teacher James Kibble, was appointed executive head of Jubilee High, until a permanent appointment could be made. He returned to the full-time headship of Salesian with the appointment of Stephen Price as head teacher of Jubilee in the spring of 2013.

In July 2013, deputy head teacher Ciran Stapleton, who served as head of school during the Salesian/Jubilee partnership, was seconded to St Joseph's Catholic High School in Slough as interim head teacher. He has since been employed as the head teacher.

In September 2014, Salesian became a teaching school, as leader of the Salesian Teaching School Alliance. In September 2015 the school started training teachers as a School Centre for Initial Teacher Training (SCITT), in partnership with St John the Baptist School, Woking, under the umbrella body Teach SouthEast. The school is also supporting the work of the Bourne Education Trust to open a new free school in Chertsey, following approval by the Department for Education in May 2015.

== Alumni ==
- John Boorman, British film director
- Tim Brabants, British world champion canoeist Olympic K1000 gold medalist
- JC Carroll, musician and film composer, The Members
- Tony Doyle, Cycling World pursuit champion 1980 & 1986
- Martin Freeman, actor
- Sarah Harding (1981–2021), English musician and member of Girls Aloud
- Andrew Mackinlay, MP
- Sir Kieran Prendergast, British diplomat
- Ian Selley (1992–1997), Arsenal FC
- Max Helyer, musician, You Me At Six
- Phil Younghusband, Chelsea FC and Philippines National Football Team
- James Younghusband, Chelsea FC and Philippines National Football Team

== Notable staff ==
- Dame Deborah James, British journalist and podcast host (was Deputy Head at Salesians)

== Extra-curricular activities ==
The school has staged productions of Sweet Charity, Bugsy Malone and Grease, The Wizard of Oz and Oliver!. It produces two bi-annual community musical concerts. The school takes part in Young Enterprise events as well as the Duke of Edinburgh Award scheme.
