= St John Bosco College, Battersea =

Coordinates: 51.4749°N 0.1717°W

St John Bosco College

Location
- Parkham Street, Battersea; London SW11 3DQ; England

Information
- Type: Voluntary aided school
- Religious affiliation: Roman Catholic
- Established: September 2011; 15 years ago
- Local authority: Wandsworth
- Department for Education URN: 135762 Tables
- Ofsted: Reports
- Chair: Jane Hargrave
- Headteacher: Paul Dunne
- Gender: Coeducational
- Age: 11 to 18
- Enrolment: 852 as of December 2022
- Website: http://www.sjbc.wandsworth.sch.uk/

St. John Bosco College is a coeducational Roman Catholic secondary school boys and girls sixth form, located in Battersea in the London Borough of Wandsworth, England.

Housed near Battersea Square, a short walk from Clapham Junction and Battersea Bridge, the school has grown in size and reputation since it moved to its new premises in the autumn of 2015.

The school is run under the joint trusteeship of the RC Archdiocese of Southwark and the Salesians of Don Bosco, and is administered by Wandsworth London Borough Council. It is named after John Bosco, an Italian priest, educator, and writer, who dedicated his life to improving the education of street children and other disadvantaged youth.

== History ==
=== Salesian education in Battersea ===
There is a history of Salesian education in Battersea. St John Bosco College is situated on the site of its predecessor school Salesian College which was founded in 1895 in Battersea, London by the religious order of the Salesians of Don Bosco. They had first arrived in Battersea in 1887 as part of Don Bosco's dream to establish a Salesian presence in Great Britain and the British Empire, with its missionary potential. The parish church of Sacred Heart adjacent to the school was first built in 1875 and the first Salesians who arrived in 1887 were Fr. Edward McKiernan, Fr. Charles Macey and Br. Rossaro. Salesian College closed in August 2011, under the Headship of Stephen McCann, to open St. John Bosco College

=== A new Roman Catholic School for Wandsworth ===
The school was established to provide a single, co-educational, Roman Catholic School in the Borough of Wandsworth by its joint Trustees; the Roman Catholic Archdiocese of Southwark and the Salesians of Don Bosco. St John Bosco College opened in September 2011 with Dr. Simon Uttley as Headteacher. Dr. Uttley was succeeded by Mr Paul Dunne as Head in January 2017. The school was initially located on the site of the former John Paul II School while the new building was constructed in Battersea. The school moved to its present site in October 2015. The move came under criticism due to the use of the old site for housing developments instead of a new primary school as campaigners had sought, citing the shortage of huge numbers of school places in the area.

== The Salesian family ==
St. John Bosco College is part of the worldwide family of Salesian schools. The Salesians have over 3000 schools in more than 130 countries worldwide. St. John Bosco College has five sister schools in England in Bolton, Bootle, Chertsey, Croxteth and Farnborough. The school has links to many other Salesian schools around the world including schools in Turin, Borgomanero, Darjeeling, Bethlehem, and Madrid.
