= Tom Barrise =

American basketball coach (1954–2022)

Personal information
- Born: February 3, 1954 Paterson, New Jersey, U.S.
- Died: March 18, 2022 (aged 68)

Career information
- High school: Don Bosco Tech (Paterson, New Jersey)
- College: Fairleigh Dickinson (1972–1973)

Career history

Coaching
- 1992–1995: Ramapo
- 2004–2012: New Jersey Nets (assistant)
- 2009: New Jersey Nets (interim)

Thomas Barrise (February 3, 1954 – March 18, 2022) was an American basketball coach in the National Basketball Association (NBA). He became the interim head coach of the New Jersey Nets for two games in late 2009, replacing Lawrence Frank after the Nets began the 2009–10 season with 16 consecutive losses. Although there were talks of Barrise finishing out the season as interim head coach, the position ultimately went to Kiki Vandeweghe. The Nets lost both games in which he served as head coach.

== Early life ==
Barrise was born in Paterson, New Jersey, on February 3, 1954. He graduated from Don Bosco Technical High School, where he played prep soccer.

Barrise studied at Fairleigh Dickinson University (FDU), where he was a two-sport athlete in basketball and soccer. He played four games for the Knights basketball team during the 1972–73 season and attempted one field goal. He graduated from FDU in 1977.

== Coaching career ==
Barrise acted as head coach of Ramapo College from 1992 to 1995. During his tenure there, he compiled a winning record in two of his three seasons. He concurrently worked for the Cleveland Cavaliers as an advance scout until 1996. Barrise also coached basketball at his alma mater FDU, Saint Peter's University, Fairfield University, East Carolina University, Jacksonville University, and William Paterson University.

Barrise subsequently joined the New Jersey Nets as an advance scout around 1996 and served in that capacity for eight seasons. He was eventually promoted to assistant coach when Lawrence Frank became head coach of the franchise in January 2004, with Barrise swapping roles with Don Newman. Following a 0–16 start to the 2009–10 season, Frank was dismissed in late November 2009 and Barrise was subsequently appointed interim head coach. He oversaw a further two losses, which established a new record for most consecutive losses to start an NBA season. He was succeeded as head coach by Kiki Vandeweghe, the Nets general manager at the time, and served briefly as his assistant before being appointed special assistant to team president Rod Thorn on January 17, 2010. Barrise was a candidate to become head coach of the FDU Knights, but did not get the job. He eventually returned to his previous position as assistant coach in July of that same year under Avery Johnson. Following the 2011–12 season, Barrise's contract was not renewed by the Nets.

Barrise later went on to hold scouting positions for the Detroit Pistons, Chicago Bulls and was on the Cleveland Cavaliers staff when he died.

== Personal life ==
Barrise was engaged to Linda Krissi at the time of his death. He was previously married to Mary, with whom he had one child, Taylor.

Barrise died on March 18, 2022, at the age of 68. He suffered from cancer prior to his death.

== Head coaching record ==
Legend
| Regular season | G | Games coached | W | Games won | L | Games lost | W–L % | Win–loss % |
| Playoffs | PG | Playoff games | PW | Playoff wins | PL | Playoff losses | PW–L % | Playoff win–loss % |

| Team | Year | G | W | L | W–L% | Finish | PG | PW | PL | PW–L% | Result |
|---|---|---|---|---|---|---|---|---|---|---|---|
| New Jersey | 2009–10 | 2 | 0 | 2 | .000 | (interim) | — | — | — | — | — |
| Career | | 2 | 0 | 2 | .000 | | — | — | — | — | |
