= Salesiano Valparaíso =

- Valparaíso, Valparaíso Region; Chile

Information
- Type: Private, primary, high school
- Religious affiliation: Roman Catholic
- Patron saint: John Bosco
- Established: 1894
- Grades: K–12
- Website: www.salesianovalparaiso.cl

Salesiano Valparaíso is a primary and secondary Salesian school. It is located in Valparaíso, Chile.
