= Miss Kangleipak =

Annual female bodybuilding competition

- Women Fitness Miss Kangleipak (Women's Best Physique)
- Nickname: Women's Best Physique
- Named after: Kangleipak
- Formation: 2012
- Founder: Manipur Amateur Body Builders Association (MABBA)
- Founded at: Kangleipak (Manipur)
- Origins: Kangleipak (Manipur)
- Region served: Kangleipak (Manipur)
- Fields: female bodybuilding
- Official language: Meitei language (officially called Manipuri language)
- Owner: Manipur Amateur Body Builders Association (MABBA)
- Parent organization: Manipur Amateur Body Builders Association (MABBA)
- Funding: Janaki Bar Bell Club (JBC), Singjamei; Lamyanba Meitei Gym, Sagolband Moirang Hanuba Leirak

Miss Kangleipak (Women's Best Physique) is an annual female bodybuilding competition of Kangleipak (Manipur (Note: Kangleipak is a popular Meitei language synonym for the Northeast Indian state of Manipur.)). It co-exists with Miss Manipur, Femina Miss India Manipur and Meetei Chanu. Founded in the year 2012 by the "Manipur Amateur Body Builders Association" (MABBA), Miss Kangleipak is sponsored by the "Janaki Bar Bell Club" (JBC), Singjamei and "Lamyanba Meitei Gym", Sagolband Moirang Hanuba Leirak.

== History ==
In the 1st edition of the Miss Kangleipak (Women's Best Physique) organised in the year 2012, Oinam Sophia was crowned the "1st Miss Kangleipak 2012". She participated the event representing "Janaki Bar Bell Club, Singjamei".

The First Runners Up and the Second Runners Up title holders in the first edition of the event are Thingbaijam ongbi Sarita and Wangkhem Jamuna respectively, from "Royal Fitness Gym, Thoubal".

The second edition of Miss Kangleipak was organised in Gandhi Memorial Hall in Imphal for the year 2013.

In the year 2015, Miss Kanglepak event was coincident with Mr Kangleipak Body Building Championship, which were organised together in Gandhi Memorial Hall in Imphal.

In the year 2016, the title of Miss Kangleipak was achieved by L. Sarita Devi of "RFA Thoubal". In the same event, Th. Leima of SBBF Kwakeithel achieved the second place.

== Awards ==
The top three winners of the Miss Kangleipak are bestowed the awards with the following cash prizes:

- First place holder — Rs 20,000,
- Second place holder — Rs 15,000 and
- Third place holder — Rs 10,000

== See also ==
- Mr. Kangleipak
- Mr. Manipur
- Mr. Moirang Khamba
- List of professional female bodybuilders
- List of professional bodybuilding competitions
- List of female fitness & figure competitors
- Sthenolagnia
- Strongwoman
