= Robert Naorem =

Indian fashion designer and makeup artist

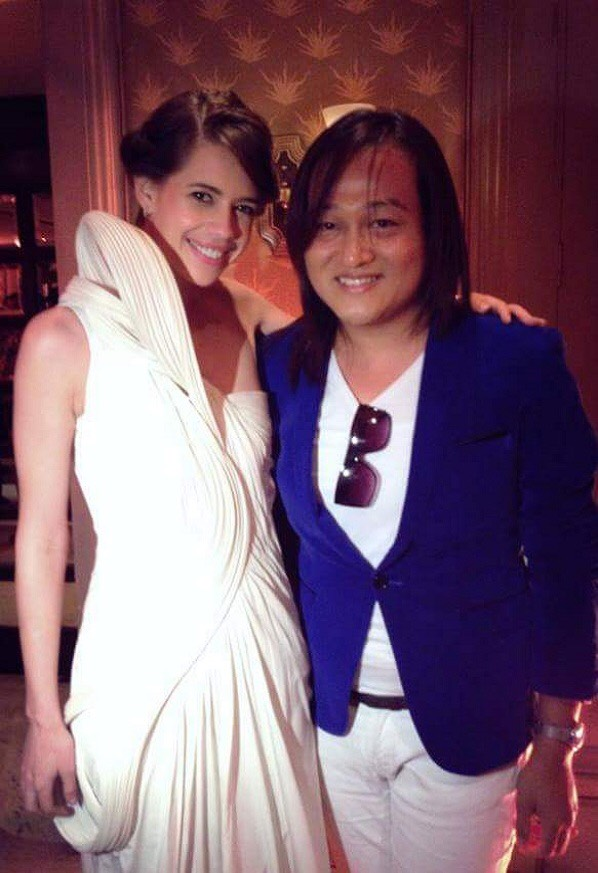
- Kalki Koechlin with Naorem in 2017
- Born: 15 May 1986 (age 40)
- Education: Surana College, Don Bosco School, Sri Bhagawan Mahaveer Jain College
- Occupations: Fashion Designer and Makeup Artist
- Parent(s): Naorem Dijamani Singh and Th. Rekha Devi
- Family: Sarita Naorem(sister), Sharmila Naorem (sister)

Robert Naorem is an Indian fashion entrepreneur, designer and makeup artist from Manipur, India. He is known for his contribution towards the handloom and textile of Manipur.

== Early life and education ==
Robert Naorem was born on 15 May 1986 to Naorem Dijamani Singh and Th. Rekha Devi at Wangjing Awang Leikai Thoubal District Manipur. After completing his schooling at Don Bosco School, Chingmeirong, Robert left for Bangalore to join Surana College. In Bangalore, he met people from fashion industry and he had his first exposure to the world of fashion. Although Robert pursued further studies, gaining an MPhil degree in Clinical Psychology later he opt for the career line of makeup artist cum fashion designer.

== Early career ==
Lack of support from his family Robert not able to gain any formal training in makeup and designing, however, he practices makeup and designing in a small salon in Bangalore.

== Career ==
=== Makeup artist ===
In 2011 Robert got an opportunity as a Makeup Director of Blenders Pride Bangalore fashion week. After that he has worked with Bollywood celebrities, fashion, sportsperson and celebrity makeup partner of Femina Miss India.

=== Career as a designer ===
Robert's debut show was the launch of a Tata motors car in the Taj hotel, Bangalore. His designs contribution improves the heritage of Manipur's fashion.

=== Fusion work on Manipuri traditional handloom clothing ===
Robert stay in touch with his hometown which has enabled him to bring back the Manipuri ethnic weaves into fashion. Robert's national and international fashion shows are booming for exhibiting fusion work on traditional Manipuri outfits.

== Achievements ==
- Manipur Fashion Extravaganza at Hotel Imphal, Imphal on 6 January 2013. The model turned choreographer, Achla Sachdev was looking glorious in the traditional bridal outfit, designed by Robert.
- Organized Third Manipur Fashion Extravaganza in 2015 in Manipur.
- Organized Kanglei Fashion Extravaganza in September 2015 in the capital city of Karnataka, Bangalore.
- Showcased "Weaving the designs" in New Delhi in December 2015 in celebrating the northeast Fashion show.
- Manipur Fashion Extravaganza on 11 January 2014, at the 1st Manipur Rifles Ground, Imphal.
- The India Fashion Week held in London, Olympia in November 2017.
- Organized NINGTHAM CHAREI 2017 at Imphal Hotel, Imphal, Manipur.
- Showcased the collections at Milan Style Walk organized by Europe Indian Fashion Council in June 2017.

== Awards ==
- International iconic award on 15 October 2017 (Handloom & textile of India) by Gold Tower group & foundation.
- Robert honoured with Global Warming Award in May 2014 in Jakarta, Indonesia.
- Earned "the most inspirational designer of 2017" award for showcasing his collections at India Fashion Week London.
- Best international designer India, at international fashion week Milan, Italy 2019
