= Salesian school =

A Salesian school is an educational institution run by the Catholic Salesian Congregation of Saint John Bosco (or Don Bosco), and one that uses his methods. Salesian schools are dedicated to young people in an educational and formative environment. According to promoters, a Salesian school is a home, church, playground, and school where students find a new way of life, and prepare for their future as good citizens of their country, while being faithful to their own religion.

== Culture ==
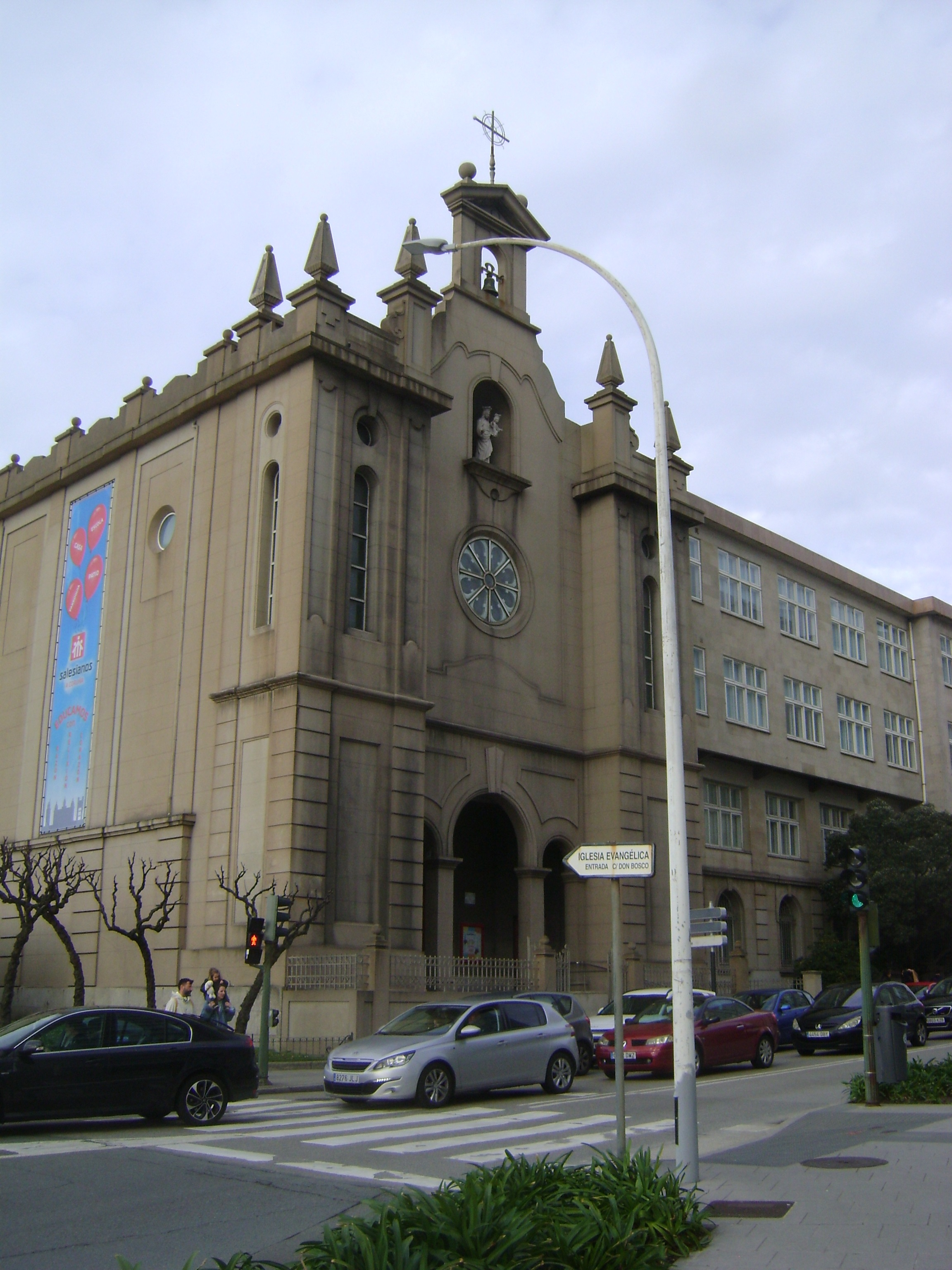
Salesian school in La Coruña, Galicia (Spain).

The figure at the center of a Salesian school is Saint John Bosco or Don Bosco, who is also known as "Father, teacher, and friend of the youth." Don Bosco was a 19th-century visionary from Italy who created a system of education for boys and girls from marginalized areas of society. For Don Bosco, "Prevention" meant helping a youth before he or she gets into trouble. Don Bosco's system has three aspects: loving kindness; reason, and religion. These three aspects have been the object of studies by scholars throughout the 20th century.

Salesian schools strive for strict discipline and order, while avoiding any kind of physical punishment, however, in his book The Devil's Advocate - Child abuse and the men in black, author and former Salesian pupil Graham Wilmer MBE, describes the levels of violence he and other pupils suffered at the hands of Salesian priests in Salesian schools in the British Salesian Province.

In Latin America, the Salesians have been a key factor in the formation of national curricula, while helping provide street children with an education. The Salesian school system involves the family, as the system holds that family and background are as important as a student's performance in school. Salesian schools give a lot of importance to Parents Associations and other groups where parents are invited to participate.

Operating in 124 countries, the Salesian system could be viewed as a kind of "globalized" education, imposing the same concepts. Although culture was very important to Don Bosco, he respected local and national identities. What can be considered global is the system itself with Don Bosco at its center, however, every Salesian school keeps its own cultural identity. For these reasons, Salesian schools have been welcomed in 124 countries, even in non-Christian nations.

== List of Salesian schools ==
Name	City	Territory	Country
Nagle College	Bairnsdale	Victoria	Australia
Salesian College (Brooklyn Park)	Adelaide	South Australia	Australia
Salesian College (Rupertswood)	Rupertswood	Victoria	Australia
Salesian College (Chadstone)	Chadstone	Victoria	Australia
Salesian College (Sunbury)	Sunbury	Victoria	Australia
Xavier College (South Australia)	Gawler Belt	South Australia	Australia
Colegio Salesiano Don Bosco	Zapote, Barrio La Granja	San Jose	Costa Rica
Salesiano Valparaíso	Valparaíso	Valparaíso	Chile
Instituto Salesiano	Macau	São Lourenço	Macau
Salesian English School	Hong Kong	Shau Kei Wan	Hong Kong
Salesian Technical School Tainan	Tainan	East District	Republic of China
Auxilium ISC School, Kottiyam	Kollam District	Kerala	India
Salesian College	Sonata	West Bengal	India
Salesian College	Celbridge	County Kildare	Ireland
Salesian Polytechnic	Tama New Town	Tokyo	Japan
Salesian High School (South Korea)	Gwangju	Jeolla-do	South Korea
Salesian High School	Eswatini	Manzini	Swaziland
Salesian School, Chertsey	Chertsey	Surrey	United Kingdom
Salesian College, Farnborough	Farnborough	Hampshire	United Kingdom
Salesian College, Battersea	Battersea	Greater London	United Kingdom
Thornleigh Salesian College	Bolton	Greater Manchester	United Kingdom
The Salesian Academy of St John Bosco	Bootle	Merseyside	United Kingdom
Salesian College Preparatory	Richmond	California	United States
Salesian High School	Los Angeles	California	United States
Archbishop Shaw High School	Marrero	Louisiana	United States
Don Bosco Technical Institute	Rosemead	California	United States
Salesian High School (New York)	New Rochelle	New York	United States
Don Bosco Preparatory High School	Ramsey	New Jersey	United States
Cristo Rey Tampa Salesian High School	Tampa	Florida	United States
Mary Help of Christians Academy	North Haledon	New Jersey	United States
Colégio Salesiano São Gonçalo	Cuiabá	Mato Grosso	Brazil
Colégio Salesiano Santo Antônio	Cuiabá	Mato Grosso	Brazil
Colégio Salesiano Belo Horizonte	Belo Horizonte	Minas Gerais	Brazil
Colegio Salesiano de Leon XIII	La Candelaria	Bogotá	Colombia
Don Bosco Vitthaya school	Udon Thani	Udon Thani	Thailand
Don Bosco Matriculation Hr. Sec. School Egmore	Chennai	Tamil Nadu	India
Colegio Salesiano Tulio Garcia Fernández	San Miguel de Tucumán	Tucumán	Argentina
Instituto Técnico Salesiano Lorenzo Massa	San Miguel de Tucumán	Tucumán	Argentina
Colegio Don Bosco - Altamira	Caracas	Miranda	Venezuela

== See also ==
- Don Bosco School (disambiguation)
- St John Bosco College (disambiguation)
