= Don Bosco College of Engineering =

College in Goa, India

- Established: 2011
- Religious affiliation: Fatorda Salesian Society
- Academic affiliations: Goa University
- Principal: Neena S. P. Panandikar
- Director: Wilfred Fernandes
- Location: Fatorda, Goa, 403 602, India; 15°17′32″N 73°58′10″E
- Website: dbcegoa.ac.in

Don Bosco College of Engineering is an institute of technical education in Fatorda, Goa. It was established in 2011, and is run by the Fatorda Salesian Society.

== Affiliations ==
The college is affiliated with Goa University and approved by the AICTE.

== Courses offered ==
- B.E. Civil Engineering: The civil engineering department undergraduates undertook a flood management solution project in 2018.
- B.E. Computer Engineering
- B.E. Electronics & Telecommunication Engineering
- B.E. Electronics and Computer Science
- B.E. Mechanical engineering: The mechanical engineering department had conducted a programme on industrial automation in the year 2018. Undergraduates of the department also undertook a project related to mechanical beach cleaning. In 2018, the department increased the intake for their B.E. course by an additional 60 seats.

== Sports ==
The college has several sports facilities and takes part in football, cricket, chess, cycling and other sports.

== FiiRE ==
Don Bosco college has a Business Incubation Center called Forum for Innovation, Incubation Research and Entrepreneurship (FiiRE). This center has a partnership with the state agriculture department, and has even signed a Memorandum of Understanding with Manovikas School's Manovikas Public Charitable Trust to guide students from a young age.

== Cultural and non-academic activities ==
DBCE organizes a project exposition called Kshitij. The Civil Engineering department organizes a national-level technical festival called Sankriti. The ETC department organizes inter college competition called technova. The college also has an active students' chapter of the Goa Technology Association (GTA).

== Gallery ==
Snapshots of the Campus

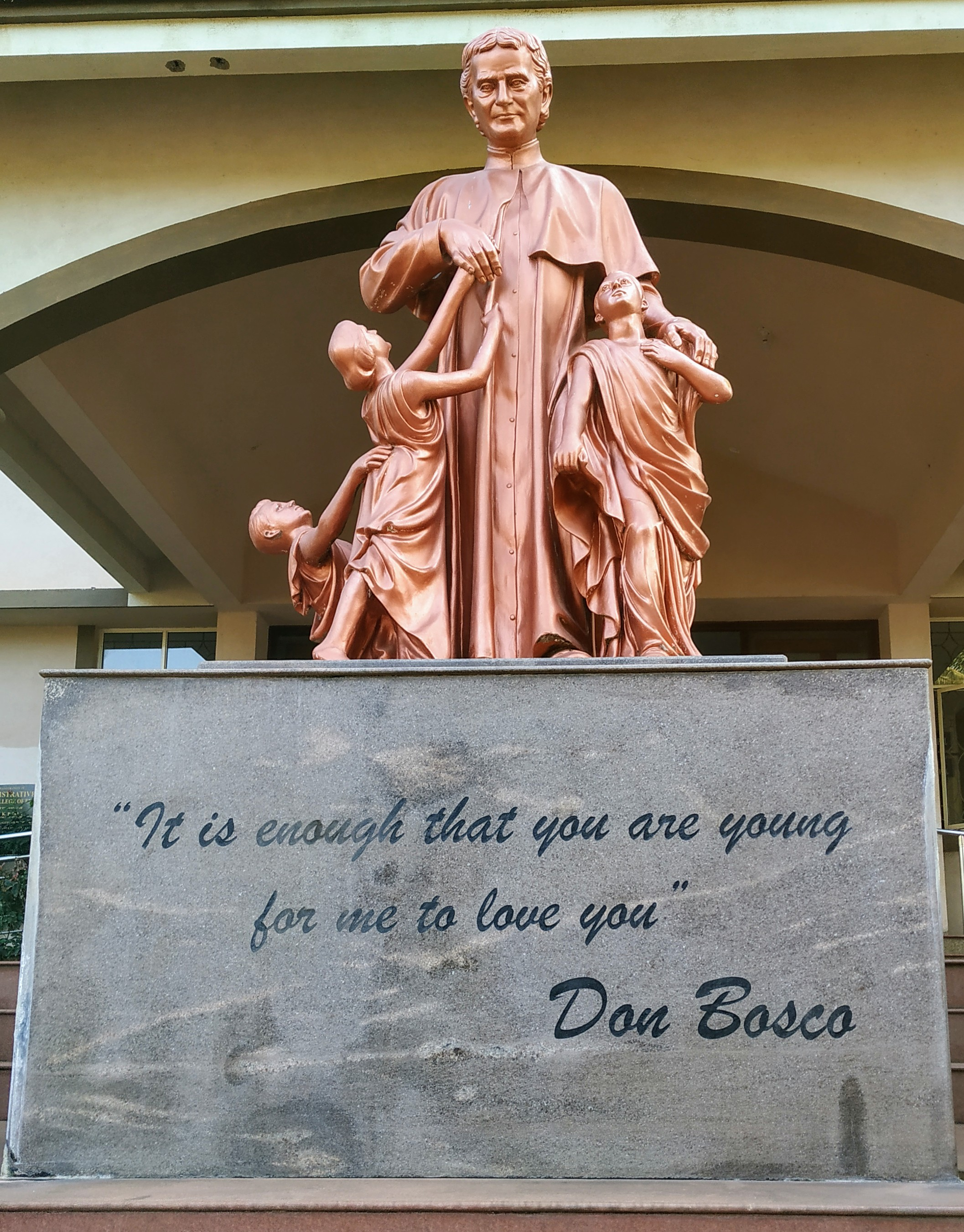
Statue of Don Bosco at the college entrance

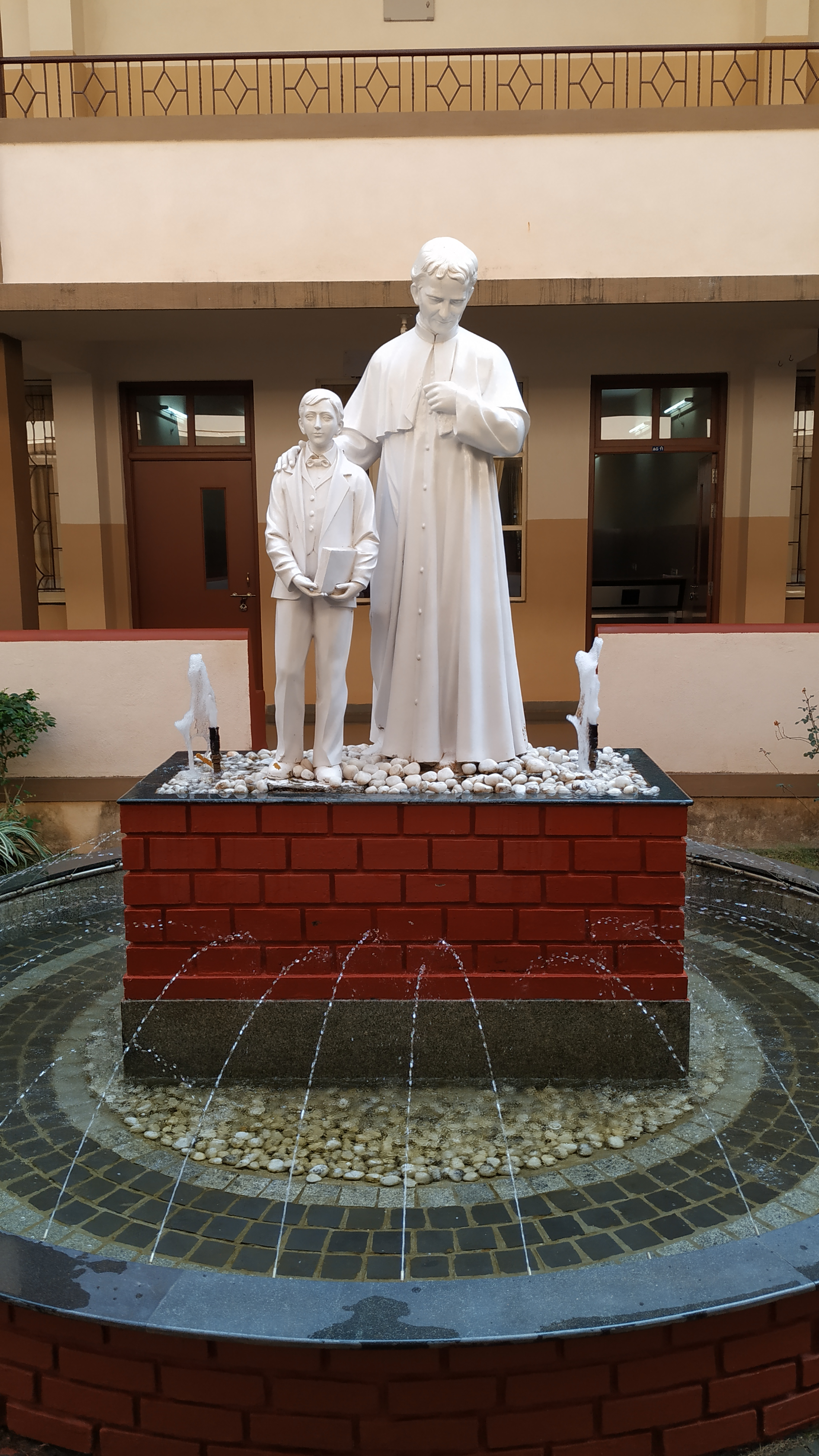
Statue of Don Bosco in the central courtyard

== See also ==
- Goa Engineering College
- Don Bosco Institute of Technology, Bangalore
