= Don Bosco Technical High School (New Jersey) =

Defunct high school in Passaic County, New Jersey, US

Information
- Established: 1948
- Closed: 2002

Don Bosco Technical High School was a vocational school located in Paterson, in Passaic County, in the U.S. state of New Jersey. The school, operated under the auspices of the Roman Catholic Diocese of Paterson, opened in 1948 and closed in 2002.

== History ==
The Salesian Fathers established the school in 1948, expending $270,000 (equivalent to $3,600,000 in 2025) to acquire and renovate the three-story former silk mill into a trade school that would provide a model for future such schools in other communities.

Despite a bump in enrollment to 290 from a low of 250 five years earlier, the school announced its closure due to tuition that didn't cover costs, growing uncollected tuition, and millions in costs anticipated for repairs to the former silk mill.

The Salesians of Don Bosco operated the school from 1948 until its closure in 2002. The facility was acquired by the New Jersey Schools Construction Corporation in 2004 for $6.3 million (equivalent to $10.7 million in 2025).

After the school closed, it was briefly home to a charter school and then used as a middle school by the Paterson Public Schools. The three school buildings were demolished in 2017 at a cost of $3.5 million. The New Jersey Schools Development Authority will cover $112 million towards the construction of Union Avenue Middle School, which is planned to accommodate 1,000 students.

== Athletics ==
Don Bosco Tech's athletic teams were known as the Rams.

The school's baseball team won the Non-Public B North state title in 1960 and 1967, and won the Non-Public B championship in 1976, defeating St. John Vianney High School in the tournament final.

== Notable alumni ==
- Tom Barrise (1954–2022), college and NBA basketball coach, who was the interim head coach of the New Jersey Nets for two games in 2009
