= Femina Miss Manipur =

Annual beauty pageant

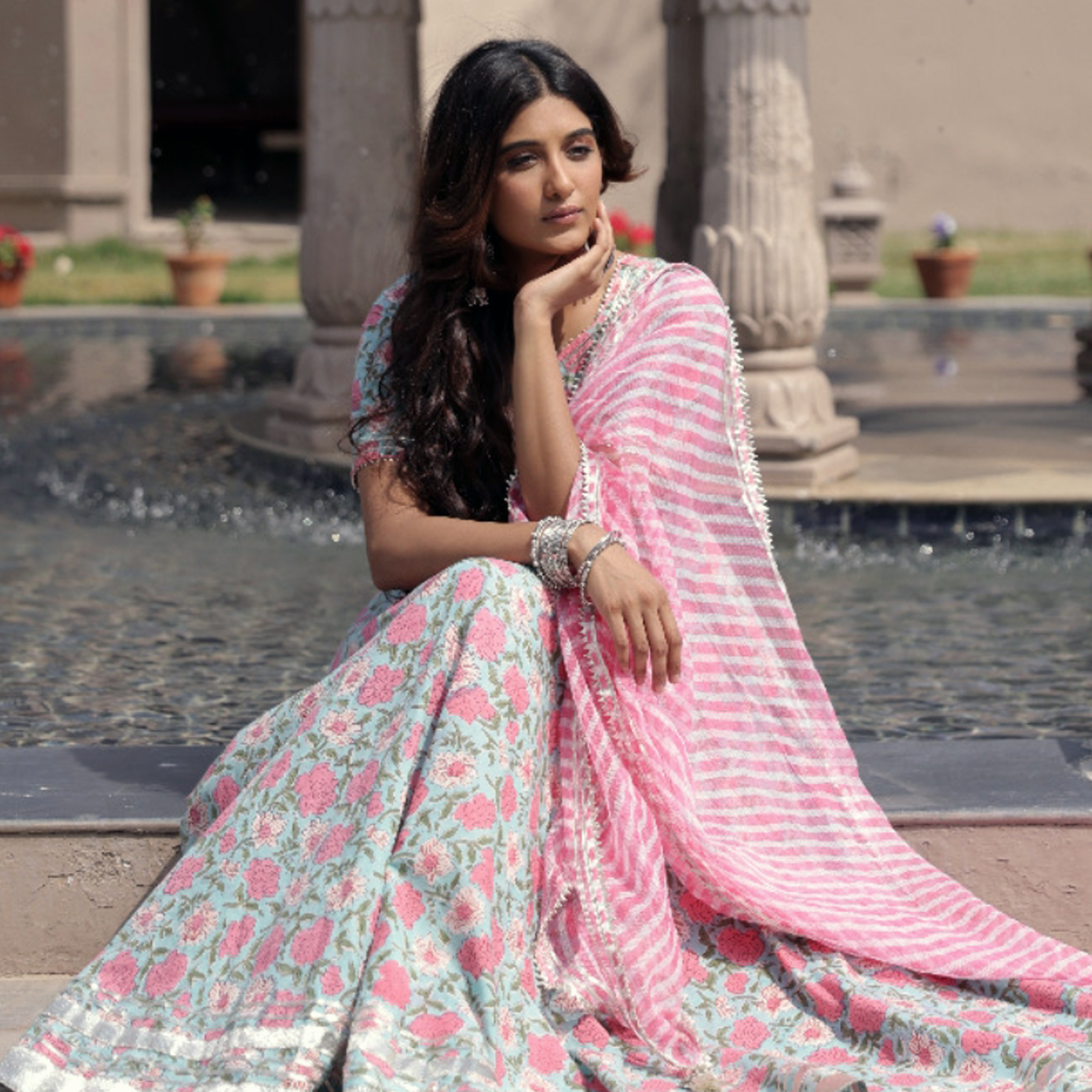
- Nimrit Ahluwalia, the winner of Femina Miss Manipur 2018
- Formation: 2017
- Type: Beauty pageant
- Headquarters: Imphal
- Location: Manipur
- Official language: Meitei (Manipuri); English
- Key people: Robert Naorem
- Parent organization: Robert Naorem Studio and Academy
- Affiliations: Femina Miss India

Femina Miss Manipur Queen or Miss India Manipur Queen is an annual beauty pageant that selects representatives from Manipur to compete in Miss India, and then to Miss World, one of the Big Four international beauty pageants. The event is organised by "Robert Naorem Studio and Academy", under the guidance of Robert Naorem. It is one of the most watched beauty pageants in North East India. It co-exists with Miss Manipur, Miss Kangleipak and Miss Meetei Chanu.

The reigning Femina Miss Manipur (Femina Miss India Manipur) titleholder is Thounaojam Strela Luwang of Imphal who was crowned by the outgoing titleholder Angobi Chanu Loukrakpam in Imphal.

== History ==
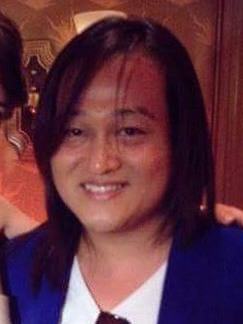
Robert Naorem, the person behind the initiation of the Femina Miss Manipur in Manipur

The Femina Miss Manipur event was first organised with the initiative of Robert Naorem Studio and Academy by Robert Naorem in 2017. It is to select representatives from Manipur to compete in Femina Miss India. Kanchan Soibam became the first to represent Manipur in the Miss India event. The general Miss Manipur contest is different from Femina Miss Manipur Queen and it has no access to Miss India event. Femina Miss Manipur is the only event in Manipur, that has connection with the national level pageant.

== Controversy around Femina Miss Manipur contest of 2018 ==
There was a mass protest against the selection of Nimrit Kaur Ahluwalia as Femina Miss Manipur 2018, since she is a native of Punjab and not from Manipur. The Kangliepak Students' Association (KSA) objected to her being the choice to represent the State of Manipur. Later, the fashion designer Robert Naorem, who was incharge of the event had to issue clarifications, and assured that the contest was organised with the firm objective of promoting indigenous people through the beauty pageant. He issued clarification that the name of Nimrit Kaur Ahluwalia was approved by Femina Miss India Organisation as an eligible candidate to participate in the Femina Miss Manipur Queen contest in accordance with the laid-out norms.

== Titleholders ==
Edition	Titleholders	Venue of Competition	Notes
2023	Thounaojam Strela Luwang	Imphal	
2022	Angobi Chanu Loukrakpam	Imphal	
2020	Maria Chanu Pangambam	Imphal	
2019	Urmila Shagolsem	Imphal	
2018	Nimrit Kaur Ahluwalia	Imphal	
2017	Soibam Kanchan	Imphal	

== See also ==
- Miss Nagaland
