= Don Bosco High School (Imphal) =

Private school in Manipur, India

Don Bosco School, Imphal

Location
- Chingmeirong, Imphal, India
- Coordinates: 24.8332°N 93.9476°E

Information
- Type: Private
- Motto: For God and Country
- Established: 5 March 1957; 69 years ago
- Founder: Fr. Peter Bianchi; Fr. A Ravilico
- Principal: Fr. Hans igness
- Faculty: Local
- Grades: Kindergarten to 10th grade
- Colors: White and black
- Affiliation: Council of Higher Secondary Education, Manipur

Don Bosco School, Imphal, situated at Chingmeirong, Imphal, India, is a co-ed, English medium school imparting education from Lower Kindergarten (LKG) through 10th grade. Established in 1957, it is run by the Salesians of Don Bosco, which is a minority institution within the Catholic Church. The school is affiliated to the Board of Secondary Education, Manipur.

The motto of the institution is For God and Country.

== History ==
The school was established on 5 March 1957 by Father Peter Bianchi and Father A Ravalico . Fr Ravalico and Fr Bianchi resided first in a rented house in Thangmeiband, and then in the place that is now Nirmalabas School. In that year, a piece of land was bought in Chingmeirong, the place where the church and boarding stand now, and the school was started, named Don Bosco Youth Centre. In 1958 the classes were held in the newly completed building. The land on which the present school building stands was bought in three pieces over the years. Three floors of this building were completed in 1975. A fourth floor was added in 1995.

The school pioneered education in the English medium in the state. As the school catered exclusively to boys, soon after it was started a sister school was established for girls by its sister society, the Salesian Sisters of Don Bosco. This second school is the Little Flower School, Imphal, on the Airport road. Today there are some 50 high schools and higher secondary schools run by the Catholic Church in Manipur and a Don Bosco College at Maram.

A second Don Bosco School was started in 1983 to ease the pressure for admissions. The performance of the school in the academic field in the three decades of the 1970s, 1980s and 1990s has seen students taking the top positions in the Board examinations year after year, with the peak in 1985 when it secured six ranks within the first ten.

It was the first school in North East India, and the second Don Bosco School in India, to offer students computer science, starting in 1986. In 2003, it became the first school in the State to introduce counselling services for its students and today the school staff offer free counselling to 21 schools in their neighborhoods.

In 2003, value education books authored by the school rector were released. Sports and games are organised through the house system.

Despite some recent setbacks due to the political turmoil in the state and the consequent law and order situation, the school continues to pioneer. The school has an extensive reach-out program taking education to the most marginalized youth of the city, through a literacy program.

The school has 41 centers giving free classes for a few hours a day to over 1100 children who have never attended school. After they have been introduced to literacy, these children are helped to get admitted into regular schools. The school has admitted nearly 3,000 of them into regular schools, and presently sponsors the poorest 600 children, paying one-third of their school fees.

The school celebrated 50 years on 27 March 2007. Over 2000 people participated in the celebration gathering.

== Houses ==
The school uses the House system to foster a sense of competition and belonging. The four houses are Red, Blue, Yellow and Green. All activities in the school are organized according to the houses. The house that wins the most points gets the Don Bosco title on top of the school building colored according to its color.

== Athletics ==
Sports played in the school have coaching classes for each of them, free for the players on the school team. The sports are :

- Basketball: This is probably the most popular sport in Don Bosco. There are two basketball courts and the game plays an important role during the annual sports days.
- Soccer: there are two football grounds inside the school, and another one outside, near the school church.
- Volleyball: there are two volleyball courts inside the school.
- Swimming: swimming used to be a popular sport, but the pond inside the school has dried up.

== Clubs and Associations ==
- NCC and Scouts
- YCS (Young Christian Students)
- Table Tennis Club
