= Salesian College, Battersea =

Salesian College

Location
- Surrey Lane; Battersea, London, SW11 3PB; England; 51.475048°N 0.172434°W

Information
- Type: Voluntary Aided Comprehensive
- Motto: Servite Domino in Laetitia (Latin: Serve the Lord with Gladness)
- Religious affiliation: Roman Catholic
- Established: 1895
- Founder: Salesians of Don Bosco
- Closed: 2011
- Local authority: Wandsworth
- Specialist: Business and Enterprise
- Department for Education URN: 101061 Tables
- Ofsted: Reports
- Chair of Governors: Nicholas Potter
- Headmaster: Stephen McCann, MPhil, MA
- Gender: Boys
- Age: 11 to 16
- Enrolment: c. 550
- Colours: Maroon and Gold

Salesian College was a Roman Catholic voluntary-aided school for boys aged 11 to 16 (previously 11 to 18, until it had to jettison its Sixth Form). It was founded in 1895 in Battersea, London, by the religious order of the Salesians of Don Bosco, who arrived in Battersea in 1887 as part of Don Bosco's dream to establish a Salesian presence in Great Britain and the British Empire, with its missionary potential. The College aimed to provide an education loosely based on the principles of St John Bosco, founder of the Salesians of Don Bosco.

== History ==
At the end of August 2011, Salesian College and the John Paul II School, both in Wandsworth Borough, merged to create a new school - St John Bosco College. This opened on 1 September 2011 and occupied the Wimbledon site of the former John Paul II School. St John Bosco College moved to the old Surrey Lane site when the new buildings were completed in 2015. In the meantime, it has served as the location of BBC3 sitcom Bad Education and art studios of the Association for Cultural Advancement through Visual Art (ACAVA).

== Notable former pupils ==
- Brian Curtin (b. 1951) - former Irish judge.
- Kevin Day (b. 1961) - comedy writer and sports presenter.
- Brian J. Dooley (b. 1963) - human rights activist.
- Andrew Grima (1921–2007) - jewellery designer.
- Sir Alfred Hitchcock (1899–1980) - film director; only spent one week there (as a boarder in 1908).
- Bryan Marshall (1938–2019) - actor.
- Martin McDonagh (b. 1970) - playwright, screenwriter, and producer.
- Lord O'Donnell (b. 1952) - former Cabinet Secretary.
- Jim Reid-Anderson (b. 1959) - Chairman, President & CEO of Six Flags.
- Yuri "Aggro" Santos (b. 1989) - Brazilian-born rapper.
- Joseph Spence (b. 1959) - Master of Dulwich College
- Catherine Tate (b. 1969) - comedian, actress, personality.
- Danny Thompson (b. 1939) - writer.
- Patrick Wilde, playwright and screenwriter.
