= Don Bosco Institute of Technology, Bengaluru =

Coordinates: 12.875588°N 77.443301°E

- Type: Private
- Established: 2001
- Parent institution: Visvesvaraya Technological University
- Accreditation: National Board of Accreditation, National Assessment and Accreditation Council
- Affiliations: Wayanamac Education Trust
- Religious affiliation: Salesians of Don Bosco
- Principal: B. S. Nagabhushana
- Dean: N. Guruprasad
- Total staff: 300+
- Location: Mysore Road, Kumbalagodu, Bangalore, Karnataka, 560074, India
- Campus: 32 acres (13 ha)
- Language: English
- Website: dbit.co.in

Don Bosco Institute of Technology (DBIT) is a college located in Kumbalagodu Village, Bangalore. In 2001, Don Bosco Institute of Technology, was established on a 32 acres (13 ha) campus, about 6 kilometres (3.7 mi) away from Kengeri bordering the Bangalore–Mysore Road. DBIT provides civil, mechanical, engineering technology, computer and management education.

In 2024, in a crackdown on excessive admissions fees by area colleges, Karnataka's Fee Regulatory Committee refunded fees paid by prospective students to Don Bosco Institute of Technology.

== See also ==
- Don Bosco College of Engineering
