= 2009–10 Indiana Pacers season =

NBA professional basketball team season

- Head coach: Jim O'Brien
- General manager: Larry Bird
- Owners: Herbert Simon
- Arena: Conseco Fieldhouse

Results
- Record: 32–50 (.390)
- Place: Division: 4th (Central); Conference: 10th (Eastern)
- Playoff finish: Did not qualify
- Stats at Basketball Reference

Local media
- Television: Fox Sports Midwest
- Radio: WFNI

The 2009–10 Indiana Pacers season was Indiana's 43rd season as a franchise and 34th season in the NBA.

== Key dates ==
- June 25 - The 2009 NBA draft took place in New York City.
- July 8 - The free agency period started.

== Summary ==
=== Free agency ===
In July 2009, the Pacers signed nine-year veteran Earl Watson to a one-year contract, and the team also signed three-year veteran Solomon Jones to a two-year contract.

== Draft picks ==
Round	Pick	Player	Position	Nationality	College
1	13	Tyler Hansbrough	PF	United States	North Carolina
2	52	A. J. Price	PG	United States	Connecticut

== Roster ==
2009–10 Indiana Pacers roster
Players

Pos.	No.	Player	Height	Weight	DOB	From
G/F	17	Mike Dunleavy Jr.	6 ft 9 in (2.06 m)	230 lb (104 kg)		Duke
G	5	T. J. Ford	6 ft 0 in (1.83 m)	165 lb (75 kg)		Texas
C	10	Jeff Foster (IN)	6 ft 11 in (2.11 m)	250 lb (113 kg)	1977-01-16	Texas State
SF	33	Danny Granger	6 ft 8 in (2.03 m)	228 lb (103 kg)	1983–04–20	New Mexico
F	50	Tyler Hansbrough (IN)	6 ft 9 in (2.06 m)	250 lb (113 kg)	1985–11–03	North Carolina
G	13	Luther Head	6 ft 3 in (1.91 m)	185 lb (84 kg)		Illinois
C	55	Roy Hibbert	7 ft 2 in (2.18 m)	278 lb (126 kg)	1986–12–11	Georgetown
G/F	1	Dahntay Jones	6 ft 6 in (1.98 m)	210 lb (95 kg)		Duke
F	44	Solomon Jones	6 ft 10 in (2.08 m)	245 lb (111 kg)		South Florida
F	32	Josh McRoberts	6 ft 10 in (2.08 m)	240 lb (109 kg)		Duke
F/C	3	Troy Murphy	6 ft 11 in (2.11 m)	245 lb (111 kg)		Notre Dame
G	22	A. J. Price	6 ft 2 in (1.88 m)	181 lb (82 kg)		Connecticut
G	25	Brandon Rush	6 ft 6 in (1.98 m)	210 lb (95 kg)		Kansas
G	2	Earl Watson	6 ft 1 in (1.85 m)	185 lb (84 kg)		UCLA

Coaches
Head coach
- Jim O'Brien
Assistant(s)
- Dick Harter
- Lester Conner
- Dan Burke
- Frank Vogel
- Jay DeFruscio

Legend
- (DP) Unsigned draft pick
- (FA) Free agent
- (S) Suspended
- Injured

== Regular season ==
=== Standings ===
Central Division	W	L	PCT	GB	Home	Road	Div
z-Cleveland Cavaliers	61	21	.744	–	35–6	26–15	12–4
x-Milwaukee Bucks	46	36	.561	15	28–13	18–23	10–6
x-Chicago Bulls	41	41	.500	20	24–17	17–24	10–6
Indiana Pacers	32	50	.390	29	23–18	9–32	6–10
Detroit Pistons	27	55	.329	34	17–24	10–31	2–14

#	Eastern Conference				
#	Team	W	L	PCT	GB
1	z-Cleveland Cavaliers	61	21	.744	–
2	y-Orlando Magic	59	23	.720	2
3	x-Atlanta Hawks	53	29	.646	8
4	y-Boston Celtics	50	32	.610	11
5	x-Miami Heat	47	35	.573	14
6	x-Milwaukee Bucks	46	36	.561	15
7	x-Charlotte Bobcats	44	38	.537	17
8	x-Chicago Bulls	41	41	.500	20
9	Toronto Raptors	40	42	.488	21
10	Indiana Pacers	32	50	.390	29
11	New York Knicks	29	53	.354	32
12	Philadelphia 76ers	27	55	.329	34
13	Detroit Pistons	27	55	.329	34
14	Washington Wizards	26	56	.317	35
15	New Jersey Nets	12	70	.146	49

=== Game log ===
2009–10 Game Log
October: 0–2 (Home: 0–1; Road: 0–1)

#	Date	Team	Score	Location Attendance	High Points	High Rebounds	High Assists	Record
1	October 28	@ Atlanta	L 109–120	Philips Arena; 17,998	D. Granger (31)	T. Murphy (10)	T. Murphy (7)	0–1
2	October 30	vs. Miami	L 83–96	Conseco Fieldhouse; 18,165	D. Granger (22)	T. Murphy (13)	L. Head (3); D. Granger (3); E. Watson (3)	0–2

November: 6–7 (Home: 4–4; Road: 2–3)

#	Date	Team	Score	Location Attendance	High Points	High Rebounds	High Assists	Record
3	November 3	vs. Denver	L 93–111	Conseco Fieldhouse; 10,627	D. Jones (20)	R. Hibbert (12)	L. Head (3)	0–3
4	November 4	@ New York	W 101–89	Madison Square Garden; 19,273	D. Granger (21)	R. Hibbert (14)	D. Granger (4)	1–3
5	November 6	vs. Washington	W 102–86	Conseco Fieldhouse; 14,556	D. Granger (22)	R. Hibbert (11)	D. Jones (5)	2–3
6	November 11	vs. Golden State	W 108–94	Conseco Fieldhouse; 10,682	D. Granger (31)	D. Granger (16)	R. Hibbert (4)	3–3
7	November 14	vs. Boston	W 113–104	Conseco Fieldhouse; 18,165	D. Granger (29)	B. Rush (8)	E. Watson (7)	4–3
8	November 17	@ New Jersey	W 91–83	Izod Center; 11,332	D. Granger (22)	R. Hibbert (10)	D. Jones (4); T. Ford (4)	5–3
9	November 18	vs. New York	L 103– 110	Conseco Fieldhouse; 12,258	D. Granger (33)	R. Hibbert (12)	T. Ford (5)	5–4
10	November 20	vs. Cleveland	L 95–105	Conseco Fieldhouse; 18,165	D. Granger (19)	T. Murphy (10)	D. Granger (5)	5–5
11	November 22	@ Charlotte	L 88–104	TWC Arena; 14,730	D. Jones (19)	T. Murphy (8)	E. Watson (5)	5–6
12	November 24	@ Toronto	L 112–123	Air Canada Centre; 17,136	D. Granger (36)	D. Granger (9)	D. Granger (5); T. Murphy (5); E. Watson (5)	5–7
13	November 25	vs. L. A. Clippers	W 86–73	Conseco Fieldhouse; 12,350	T. Murphy (18); D. Jones (18)	T. Murphy (11); B. Rush (11)	T. Ford (6)	6–7
14	November 27	vs. Dallas	L 92–113	Conseco Fieldhouse; 16,613	D. Granger (20)	J. Foster (6)	T. Ford (5)	6–8
15	November 30	@ Golden State	L 107–126	Oracle Arena; 16,574	M. Dunleavy (22); D. Granger (22)	T. Murphy (10)	T. Ford (4); J. Foster (4); T. Murphy (4)	6–9

December: 3–13 (Home: 2–4; Road: 1–9)

#	Date	Team	Score	Location Attendance	High Points	High Rebounds	High Assists	Record
16	December 2	@ Sacramento	L 105–110	Arco Arena; 10,021	D. Granger (33)	J. Foster (18)	T. Murphy (3); J. Foster (3)	6–10
17	December 4	@ Utah	L 87–96	EnergySolutions Arena; 19,347	D. Granger (26)	T. Murphy (10)	M. Dunleavy (4); E. Watson (4)	6–11
18	December 5	@ L. A. Clippers	L 72–88	Staples Center; 15,305	T. Murphy (13)	T. Murphy (9)	E. Watson (9)	6–12
19	December 9	vs. Portland	L 91–102	Conseco Fieldhouse; 11,487	D. Jones (19)	T. Hansbrough (11)	T. Ford (5)	6–13
20	December 11	vs. New Jersey	W 107–91	Conseco Fieldhouse; 12,175	T. Hansbrough (21)	T. Murphy (12)	T. Ford (5)	7–13
21	December 12	@ Washington	W 114–113	Verizon Center; 13,172	T. Murphy (28)	T. Murphy (12)	E. Watson (10)	8–13
22	December 14	@ Orlando	L 98–106	Amway Arena; 17,461	M. Dunleavy (26)	T. Murphy (6); T. Ford (6); T. Hansbrough (6)	T. Ford (7)	8–14
23	December 16	vs. Charlotte	W 101–98	Conseco Fieldhouse; 11,888	T. Murphy (26)	T. Murphy (15)	T. Ford (13)	9–14
24	December 18	@ Memphis	L 94–107	FedEx Forum; 13,217	M. Dunleavy (16); T. Ford (16)	E. Watson (8); T. Murphy (8)	T. Murphy (8); D. Jones (3)	9–15
25	December 19	@ San Antonio	L 99–100	AT&T Center; 17,075	T. Murphy (21)	R. Hibbert (7); T. Murphy (7)	T. Ford (5); E. Watson (5)	9–16
26	December 21	vs. Milwaukee	L 81–84	Conseco Fieldhouse; 12,836	R. Hibbert (16)	T. Murphy (13)	T. Ford (5)	9–17
27	December 22	@ Boston	L 94–103	TD Garden; 18,624	T. Murphy (24)	T. Murphy (18)	D. Jones (8)	9–18
28	December 26	vs. Atlanta	L 98–110	Conseco Fieldhouse; 15,281	L. Head (19); T. Hansbrough (19); T. Murphy (19)	T. Murphy (12)	T. Ford (9)	9–19
29	December 27	@ Miami	L 80–114	American Airlines Arena; 19,600	T. Murphy (16)	T. Hansbrough (10)	T. Ford (4)	9–20
30	December 29	@ Chicago	L 95–104	United Center; 21,887	R. Hibbert (17)	R. Hibbert (6)	D. Jones (7)	9–21
31	December 30	vs. Memphis	L 110–121	Conseco Fieldhouse; 14,741	L. Head (30)	R. Hibbert (13)	E. Watson (6)	9–22

January: 7-10 (Home: 4-4; Road: 3-6)

#	Date	Team	Score	Location Attendance	High Points	High Rebounds	High Assists	Record
32	January 2	vs. Minnesota	W 122–111	Conseco Fieldhouse; 12,685	L. Head (21); R. Hibbert (21)	M. Dunleavy (8); J. McRoberts (8)	E. Watson (9)	10–22
33	January 3	@ New York	L 89–132	Madison Square Garden; 19,763	L. Head (18)	B. Rush (8)	R. Hibbert (7)	10–23
34	January 5	vs. Orlando	W 97–90	Conseco Fieldhouse; 11,119	R. Hibbert (26)	M. Dunleavy (9)	E. Watson (4)	11–23
35	January 8	@ Minnesota	L 109-116	Target Center; 13,111	T. Murphy (21)	4 players (6)	E. Watson (7); A.J. Price (7)	11–24
36	January 9	@ Oklahoma City	L 102–108	Ford Center; 18,203	D. Granger (25)	T. Murphy (15)	E. Watson (9)	11–25
37	January 11	vs. Toronto	W 105-101	Conseco Fieldhouse; 11,039	D. Granger (23)	T. Murphy (16)	E. Watson (8)	12–25
38	January 13	vs. Phoenix	W 122-114	Conseco Fieldhouse; 10,858	D. Granger (33)	T. Murphy (14)	E. Watson (9)	13–25
39	January 15	@ New Jersey	W 121-105	Izod Center; 13,656	D. Granger (28)	T. Murphy (14)	3 players (5)	14–25
40	January 16	vs. New Orleans	L 96-101	Conseco Fieldhouse; 13,376	R. Hibbert (27)	R. Hibbert (10)	E. Watson (7)	14–26
41	January 19	@ Miami	L 83-113	American Airlines Center; 14,986	B. Rush (17)	T. Murphy (12)	D. Jones (5)	14–27
42	January 20	@ Orlando	L 98-109	Amway Arena; 17,461	D. Granger (25)	T. Murphy (10)	E. Watson (4)	14–28
43	January 22	@ Detroit	W 105-93	The Palace of Auburn Hills; 15,388	D. Granger (25)	T. Murphy (11)	E. Watson (6)	15–28
44	January 23	vs. Philadelphia	L 97-107	Conseco Fieldhouse; 16,074	D. Granger (22)	T. Murphy (12)	5 players (3)	15–29
45	January 25	@ Philadelphia	W 109-98	Wachovia Center; 10,579	D. Granger (26)	T. Murphy (12)	T. Murphy (7)	16–29
46	January 27	vs. L. A. Lakers	L 96-118	Conseco Fieldhouse; 18,165	R. Hibbert (21)	B. Rush (11)	E. Watson (7)	16–30
47	January 29	vs. Cleveland	L 73-94	Conseco Fieldhouse; 18,165	D. Granger (13)	D. Granger (10)	D. Granger (5)	16–31
48	January 31	@ Toronto	L 102-117	Air Canada Centre; 16,715	L. Head (15)	T. Murphy (8)	E. Watson (6)	16–32

February: 4-7 (Home: 3–3; Road: 1-4)

#	Date	Team	Score	Location Attendance	High Points	High Rebounds	High Assists	Record
49	February 2	vs. Toronto	W 130-115	Conseco Fieldhouse; 11,191	D. Granger (23)	T. Murphy (14)	E. Watson (11)	17–32
50	February 5	vs. Detroit	W 107-83	Conseco Fieldhouse; 14,832	D. Granger (25)	R. Hibbert (11)	B. Rush (5); T.J. Ford (5)	18–32
51	February 6	@ Milwaukee	L 81-93	Bradley Center; 18,717	T. Ford (20)	T. Murphy (11)	D. Granger (5)	18–33
52	February 9	vs. Chicago	L 101-109	Conseco Fieldhouse; 12,945	D. Granger (27)	T. Murphy (16)	E. Watson (6)	18–34
53	February 17	vs. San Antonio	L 87-90	Conseco Fieldhouse; 14,947	D. Granger (23)	T. Murphy (16)	E. Watson (8)	18–35
54	February 19	@ New Orleans	L 101-107	New Orleans Arena; 15,644	D. Granger (29)	T. Murphy (7)	T. Ford (6)	18–36
55	February 20	@ Houston	W 125-115	Toyota Center; 16,550	D. Granger (36)	T. Murphy (12)	D. Granger (4); T. Murphy (4)	19–36
56	February 22	@ Dallas	L 82-91	American Airlines Center; 19,585	T. Ford (14)	T. Murphy (11)	5 players (3)	19–37
57	February 24	@ Chicago	L 110-120	United Center; 20,363	B. Rush (21)	D. Granger (7); B. Rush (7)	D. Granger (5)	19–38
58	February 25	vs. Milwaukee	L 110-112	Conseco Fieldhouse; 14,116	D. Granger (21)	E. Watson (8)	E. Watson (5); T. Ford (5)	19–39
59	February 27	vs. Chicago	W 100-90	Conseco Fieldhouse; 18,165	D. Granger (30)	D. Granger (8)	T. Ford (7)	20–39

March: 8-8 (Home: 7–0; Road: 1–8)

#	Date	Visitor	Score	Arena Attendance	High Points	High Rebounds	High Assists	Record
60	March 2	@ L. A. Lakers	L 99-122	Staples Center; 18,997	T. Murphy (17)	T. Murphy (13)	E. Watson (10)	20–40
61	March 3	@ Portland	L 79-102	Rose Garden Arena; 20,623	D. Granger (30)	B. Rush (8)	T. Ford (5)	20–41
62	March 5	@ Denver	L 114-122	Pepsi Center; 19,155	D. Granger (32)	T. Murphy (9)	T. Ford (4); J. McRoberts (4)	20–42
63	March 6	@ Phoenix	L 105-113	US Airways Center; 18,180	D. Granger (24)	T. Murphy (16)	T. Ford (5)	20–43
64	March 9	vs. Philadelphia	W 107-96	Conseco Fieldhouse; 11,535	D. Jones (25)	R. Hibbert (11)	E. Watson (10)	21–43
65	March 12	@ Boston	L 103-122	TD Garden; 18,624	R. Hibbert (23)	T. Murphy (9)	B. Rush (6); E. Watson (6)	21–44
66	March 14	@ Milwaukee	L 94-98	Bradley Center; 15,107	D. Granger (29)	T. Murphy (12)	4 players (3)	21–45
67	March 16	vs. Charlotte	W 99-94	Conseco Fieldhouse; 10,850	D. Granger (26)	T. Murphy (13)	T. Murphy (5)	22–45
68	March 17	@ Cleveland	L 94-99	Quicken Loans Arena; 20,562	R. Hibbert (20)	T. Murphy (15)	D. Jones (6); A. Price (6)	22–46
69	March 19	vs. Detroit	W 106-102	Conseco Fieldhouse; 13,583	D. Granger (29)	T. Murphy (8)	E. Watson (11)	23–46
70	March 21	vs. Oklahoma City	W 121-101	Conseco Fieldhouse; 14,701	D. Granger (32)	T. Murphy (13)	E. Watson (8)	24–46
71	March 23	@ Detroit	W 98-83	The Palace of Auburn Hills; 17,109	D. Granger (32)	T. Murphy (12)	E. Watson (13)	25–46
72	March 24	vs. Washington	W 99-82	Conseco Fieldhouse; 12,504	D. Granger (31)	T. Murphy (19)	E. Watson (7)	26–46
73	March 26	vs. Utah	W 122-106	Conseco Fieldhouse; 15,463	D. Granger (44)	T. Murphy (9)	R. Hibbert (6); E. Watson (6)	27–46
74	March 28	@ Atlanta	L 84-94	Philips Arena; 16,646	T. Murphy (21)	T. Murphy (14)	E. Watson (13)	27–47
75	March 30	vs. Sacramento	W 102-95	Conseco Fieldhouse; 13,339	D. Granger (33)	T. Murphy (13)	B. Rush (5); E. Watson (5)	28–47

April: 4–3 (Home: 3-2; Road: 1–1)

#	Date	Visitor	Score	Arena/Attendance	High Points	High Rebounds	High Assists	Record
76	April 2	vs. Miami	L 96-105 (OT)	Conseco Fieldhouse; 16,787	T. Murphy (29)	T. Murphy (15)	E. Watson (5)	28–48
77	April 4	vs. Houston	W 133-102	Conseco Fieldhouse; 14,201	R. Hibbert (20)	T. Murphy (12); J. McRoberts (12)	R. Hibbert (7)	29–48
78	April 7	vs. New York	W 113-105	Conseco Fieldhouse; 15,330	D. Granger (33)	T. Murphy (12)	E. Watson (6)	30–48
79	April 9	@ Cleveland	W 116-113	Quicken Loans Arena; 20,562	D. Granger (36)	T. Murphy (11)	E. Watson (10)	31–48
80	April 10	vs. New Jersey	W 115-102	Conseco Fieldhouse; 18,165	T. Murphy (25)	T. Murphy (9)	E. Watson (6)	32–48
81	April 12	vs. Orlando	L 98-118	Conseco Fieldhouse; 18,165	A. Price (19)	B. Rush (12)	E. Watson (4); R. Hibbert (4); A. Price (4)	32–49
82	April 14	@ Washington	L 97-98	Verizon Center; 16,126	R. Hibbert (29)	T. Murphy (9); D. Granger (9)	J. McRoberts (4)	32–50

== Player statistics ==
=== Ragular season ===
Player	POS	GP	GS	MP	REB	AST	STL	BLK	PTS	MPG	RPG	APG	SPG	BPG	PPG
Brandon Rush	SG	82	64	2,491	346	112	56	65	774	30.4	4.2	1.4	.7	.8	9.4
Roy Hibbert	C	81	69	2,035	464	158	30	131	946	25.1	5.7	2.0	.4	1.6	11.7
Earl Watson	PG	79	52	2,322	240	399	104	16	619	29.4	3.0	5.1	1.3	.2	7.8
Dahntay Jones	SF	76	26	1,892	229	150	40	39	776	24.9	3.0	2.0	.5	.5	10.2
Troy Murphy	PF	72	69	2,344	737	150	72	34	1,050	32.6	10.2	2.1	1.0	.5	14.6
Mike Dunleavy Jr.	SF	67	15	1,486	236	103	38	15	666	22.2	3.5	1.5	.6	.2	9.9
Danny Granger	SF	62	62	2,278	342	171	94	51	1,497	36.7	5.5	2.8	1.5	.8	24.1
A. J. Price	PG	56	2	865	88	106	35	3	410	15.4	1.6	1.9	.6	.1	7.3
Solomon Jones	C	52	2	675	144	32	14	37	207	13.0	2.8	.6	.3	.7	4.0
T. J. Ford	PG	47	32	1,189	149	180	44	11	484	25.3	3.2	3.8	.9	.2	10.3
Luther Head	SG	47	10	813	80	72	18	9	357	17.3	1.7	1.5	.4	.2	7.6
Josh McRoberts	C	42	3	524	127	44	17	16	179	12.5	3.0	1.0	.4	.4	4.3
Tyler Hansbrough	PF	29	1	511	138	28	17	8	246	17.6	4.8	1.0	.6	.3	8.5
Jeff Foster	C	16	3	255	81	21	3	4	49	15.9	5.1	1.3	.2	.3	3.1
Travis Diener^{†}	PG	4	0	25	2	4	3	0	3	6.3	.5	1.0	.8	.0	.8

- ^{†} Denotes player spent time with another team in the season. Stats reflect time with the Pacers only.
