= 2009–10 San Antonio Spurs season =

- Head coach: Gregg Popovich
- General manager: R.C. Buford
- Arena: AT&T Center

Results
- Record: 50–32 (.610)
- Place: Division: 2nd (Southwest); Conference: 7th (Western)
- Playoff finish: Conference Semifinals (lost to Suns 0–4)
- Stats at Basketball Reference

Local media
- Television: Fox Sports Southwest, KENS, KMYS
- Radio: WOAI

The 2009–10 San Antonio Spurs season was the 43rd season of the franchise, 37th in San Antonio, and 34th in the National Basketball Association (NBA).

In the playoffs, the Spurs defeated the Dallas Mavericks in six games in the First Round, before being swept by the Phoenix Suns in four games in the Semifinals.

== Key dates ==
- June 25 – The 2009 NBA draft took place in New York City.
- July 8 – The free agency period started.

== Draft picks ==
Round	Pick	Player	Position	Nationality	College/Team
2	37	DeJuan Blair (from Golden State via Phoenix)	PF	United States	Pittsburgh (So.)
2	51	Jack McClinton (from New Orleans via Toronto)	SG	United States	Miami (FL) (Sr.)
2	53	Nando de Colo (from Houston)	PG	France	Cholet (France)

== Roster ==
2009–10 San Antonio Spurs roster
Players

Pos.	No.	Player	Height	Weight	DOB	From
PF	45	DeJuan Blair	6 ft 7 in (2.01 m)	270 lb (122 kg)	1989–04–22	Pittsburgh
G/F	10	Keith Bogans	6 ft 5 in (1.96 m)	215 lb (98 kg)	1980–05–12	Kentucky
PF	15	Matt Bonner	6 ft 10 in (2.08 m)	235 lb (107 kg)	1980–04–05	Florida
PF	21	Tim Duncan	6 ft 11 in (2.11 m)	255 lb (116 kg)	1976–04–25	Wake Forest
G/F	23	Alonzo Gee (IN)	6 ft 6 in (1.98 m)	219 lb (99 kg)	1987–05–29	Alabama
SG	20	Manu Ginóbili	6 ft 6 in (1.98 m)	200 lb (91 kg)	1977–07–28	Argentina
G	1	Malik Hairston (IN)	6 ft 6 in (1.98 m)	220 lb (100 kg)	1987–02–23	Oregon
G	3	George Hill	6 ft 3 in (1.91 m)	180 lb (82 kg)	1986–05–04	IUPUI
F	24	Richard Jefferson	6 ft 7 in (2.01 m)	234 lb (106 kg)	1980–06–21	Arizona
G	5	Curtis Jerrells (IN)	6 ft 1 in (1.85 m)	195 lb (88 kg)	1987–02–05	Baylor
C	28	Ian Mahinmi	6 ft 11 in (2.11 m)	230 lb (104 kg)	1986–11–05	France
G	8	Roger Mason	6 ft 5 in (1.96 m)	212 lb (96 kg)	1980-09-10	Virginia
F/C	34	Antonio McDyess	6 ft 9 in (2.06 m)	245 lb (111 kg)	1974–09–07	Alabama
PG	9	Tony Parker	6 ft 2 in (1.88 m)	185 lb (84 kg)	1982–05–17	France
G	2	Garrett Temple	6 ft 6 in (1.98 m)	190 lb (86 kg)	1986–05–08	LSU

Coaches
Head coach
- Gregg Popovich
Assistant(s)
- Brett Brown
- Mike Budenholzer
- Chip Engelland
- Chad Forcier
- Don Newman

Legend
- (DP) Unsigned draft pick
- (FA) Free agent
- (S) Suspended
- Injured

== Pre-season ==
2009 Pre-season game log: 0–0–0 (home: 0–0–0; road: 0–0–0)
#	Date	Visitor	Score	Home	OT	Decision	Attendance	Record	Recap
1	October 6	Houston	L 85–99	San Antonio Spurs			15,545	0–1
2	October 9	Olympiacos Piraeus (Greece)	W 107–89	San Antonio Spurs			17,677	1–1
3	October 11	San Antonio Spurs	W 95–93	Miami Heat			10,064	2–1
4	October 14	Los Angeles Clippers	L 90–93	San Antonio Spurs			15,498	2–2
5	October 16	Cleveland Cavaliers	W 105–98	San Antonio Spurs			17,168	3–2
6	October 20	San Antonio Spurs	W 119–102	Oklahoma City Thunder (@ Austin, Texas)			10,290	4–2
7	October 23	San Antonio Spurs	L 112–114	Indiana Pacers (@ Bloomington, Indiana)			8,029	4–3

== Regular season ==
=== Standings ===
Southwest Division	W	L	PCT	GB	Home	Road	Div
y-Dallas Mavericks	55	27	.671	–	28–13	27–14	10–6
x-San Antonio Spurs	50	32	.610	5	29–12	21–20	9–7
Houston Rockets	42	40	.512	13	23–18	19–22	9–7
Memphis Grizzlies	40	42	.488	15	23–18	17–24	5–11
New Orleans Hornets	37	45	.451	18	24–17	13–28	7–9

#	Western Conference				
#	Team	W	L	PCT	GB
1	c-Los Angeles Lakers	57	25	.695	–
2	y-Dallas Mavericks	55	27	.671	2
3	x-Phoenix Suns	54	28	.659	3
4	y-Denver Nuggets	53	29	.646	4
5	x-Utah Jazz	53	29	.646	4
6	x-Portland Trail Blazers	50	32	.610	7
7	x-San Antonio Spurs	50	32	.610	7
8	x-Oklahoma City Thunder	50	32	.610	7
9	Houston Rockets	42	40	.512	15
10	Memphis Grizzlies	40	42	.488	17
11	New Orleans Hornets	37	45	.451	20
12	Los Angeles Clippers	29	53	.354	28
13	Golden State Warriors	26	56	.317	31
14	Sacramento Kings	25	57	.305	32
15	Minnesota Timberwolves	15	67	.183	42

=== Game log ===
2009–10 game log
Total: 50–32 (home: 29–12; road: 21–20)
October: 2–1 (home: 2–0; road: 0–1)

Game	Date	Team	Score	High points	High rebounds	High assists	Location Attendance	Record
1	October 28	New Orleans	W 103–96	Tony Parker (17)	DeJuan Blair (11)	Tony Parker (7)	AT&T Center; 18,581	1–0
2	October 30	@ Chicago	L 85–92	Tim Duncan (28)	Tim Duncan (16)	Manu Ginóbili (4)	United Center; 21,412	1–1
3	October 31	Sacramento	W 113–94	Tony Parker (24)	DeJuan Blair, Tim Duncan (10)	Tony Parker (7)	AT&T Center; 16,966	2–1

November : 7–5 (home: 6–2; road: 1–3)

Game	Date	Team	Score	High points	High rebounds	High assists	Location Attendance	Record
4	November 5	@ Utah	L 99–113	Tony Parker (21)	Tim Duncan (13)	Richard Jefferson, Tony Parker (3)	EnergySolutions Arena; 19,797	2–2
5	November 6	@ Portland	L 84–96	Richard Jefferson (19)	Tim Duncan (8)	Manu Ginóbili, Roger Mason (4)	Rose Garden; 20,498	2–3
6	November 9	Toronto	W 131–124	Manu Ginóbili (36)	Antonio McDyess (10)	Richard Jefferson (7)	AT&T Center; 17,714	3–3
7	November 11	Dallas	W 92–83	Richard Jefferson (29)	Matt Bonner, Antonio McDyess (9)	Manu Ginóbili (6)	AT&T Center; 18,581	4–3
8	November 14	Oklahoma City	L 98–101	Tim Duncan (22)	Tim Duncan (10)	Manu Ginóbili (6)	AT&T Center; 17,947	4–4
9	November 18	@ Dallas	L 94–99 (OT)	Tim Duncan (22)	Tim Duncan (14)	Tim Duncan (6)	American Airlines Center; 20,110	4–5
10	November 19	Utah	L 83–90	Tim Duncan (21)	Tim Duncan (9)	Tim Duncan (5)	AT&T Center; 17,519	4–6
11	November 21	Washington	W 106–84	Tony Parker (17)	Theo Ratliff (11)	Tony Parker (8)	AT&T Center; 16,888	5–6
12	November 23	Milwaukee	W 112–98	Tim Duncan (24)	Tim Duncan (12)	Tony Parker (6)	AT&T Center; 17,677	6–6
13	November 25	Golden State	W 118–104	Tony Parker (32)	Tim Duncan (10)	Tony Parker (7)	AT&T Center; 17,606	7–6
14	November 27	@ Houston	W 92–84	Tim Duncan (21)	Antonio McDyess (14)	Tony Parker (7)	Toyota Center; 18,164	8–6
15	November 29	Philadelphia	W 97–89	Tim Duncan (22)	DeJuan Blair (10)	Tony Parker (8)	AT&T Center; 17,161	9–6

December : 10–5 (home: 6–3; road: 4–2)

Game	Date	Team	Score	High points	High rebounds	High assists	Location Attendance	Record
16	December 3	Boston	L 83–90	DeJuan Blair (18)	Tim Duncan (15)	Tony Parker (7)	AT&T Center; 18,581	9–7
17	December 5	Denver	L 99–106	Tony Parker (27)	Matt Bonner (7)	Tony Parker (5)	AT&T Center; 17,592	9–8
18	December 7	@ Utah	L 101–104	Matt Bonner (28)	Tim Duncan (11)	Tony Parker (5)	EnergySolutions Arena; 17,565	9–9
19	December 9	Sacramento	W 118–106	Richard Jefferson (23)	Antonio McDyess (9)	Tony Parker (11)	AT&T Center; 17,353	10–9
20	December 11	Charlotte	W 104–85	Manu Ginóbili (22)	Tim Duncan (9)	Tony Parker (10)	AT&T Center; 17,508	11–9
21	December 13	@ L.A Clippers	W 115–90	Tim Duncan (21)	DeJuan Blair (9)	Tony Parker (7)	Staples Center; 16,464	12–9
22	December 15	@ Phoenix	L 104–116	Tim Duncan (34)	Tim Duncan (14)	Manu Ginóbili (6)	US Airways Center; 17,964	12–10
23	December 16	@ Golden State	W 103–91	Tim Duncan (27)	Tim Duncan (15)	Manu Ginóbili (5)	Oracle Arena; 17,857	13–10
24	December 19	Indiana	W 100–99	Tim Duncan (19)	Tim Duncan (16)	Tony Parker (4)	AT&T Center; 17,075	14–10
25	December 21	L.A Clippers	W 103–87	Tony Parker (19)	Theo Ratliff (7)	Roger Mason, Jr. (5)	AT&T Center; 17,451	15–10
26	December 23	Portland	L 94–98	Tim Duncan (24)	Tim Duncan (11)	Tony Parker, Manu Ginóbili, George Hill, Roger Mason, Jr. (4)	AT&T Center; 18,581	15–11
27	December 26	@ Milwaukee	W 112–97	Tim Duncan (26)	DeJuan Blair (12)	Tony Parker, Manu Ginóbili (8)	Bradley Center; 14,864	16–11
28	December 27	@ New York	W 95–88	Tony Parker (22)	DeJuan Blair (10)	Richard Jefferson (4)	Madison Square Garden; 19,763	17–11
29	December 29	Minnesota	W 117–99	Richard Jefferson (24)	Tim Duncan (10)	Manu Ginóbili (10)	AT&T Center; 18,581	18–11
30	December 31	Miami	W 108–78	Tim Duncan (23)	Tim Duncan (10)	Tony Parker (9)	AT&T Center; 18,581	19–11

January : 8–8 (home: 5–5; road: 3–3)

Game	Date	Team	Score	High points	High rebounds	High assists	Location Attendance	Record
31	January 2	@ Washington	W 97–86	Tim Duncan (23)	Tim Duncan (7)	Tony Parker (7)	Verizon Center; 19,025	20–11
32	January 3	@ Toronto	L 86–91	Tony Parker (23)	Tim Duncan (12)	Tony Parker (6)	Air Canada Centre; 18,323	20–12
33	January 6	Detroit	W 112–92	Tony Parker (23)	DeJuan Blair (8)	Tony Parker (6)	AT&T Center; 17,337	21–12
34	January 8	Dallas	L 103–112	Tim Duncan (31)	Tim Duncan (12)	Manu Ginóbili (7)	AT&T Center; 18,581	21–13
35	January 10	New Jersey	W 97–85	Manu Ginóbili (21)	Tim Duncan (17)	Tony Parker (5)	AT&T Center; 18,047	22–13
36	January 12	L.A Lakers	W 105–85	Tim Duncan (25)	Tim Duncan (13)	Tony Parker, Manu Ginóbili (6)	AT&T Center; 18,581	23–13
37	January 13	@ Oklahoma City	W 109–108 (OT)	Tony Parker, DeJuan Blair (28)	DeJuan Blair (21)	Tony Parker (8)	Ford Center; 17,886	24–13
38	January 15	@ Charlotte	L 76–92	Tony Parker, DeJuan Blair, George Hill, Manu Ginóbili (11)	DeJuan Blair (16)	Tim Duncan (5)	Time Warner Cable Arena; 15,742	24–14
39	January 16	@ Memphis	L 86–92	Tim Duncan (23)	DeJuan Blair, Tim Duncan (8)	Manu Ginóbili (7)	FedExForum; 14,116	24–15
40	January 18	@ New Orleans	W 97–90	Tony Parker (25)	Tim Duncan (14)	Manu Ginóbili (6)	New Orleans Arena; 16,549	25–15
41	January 20	Utah	L 98–105	Manu Ginóbili (22)	DeJuan Blair (11)	Manu Ginóbili (8)	AT&T Center; 17,584	25–16
42	January 22	Houston	L 109–116	Tim Duncan (25)	Tim Duncan (14)	Tony Parker (10)	AT&T Center; 18,581	25–17
43	January 25	Chicago	L 93–98	Tony Parker (20)	DeJuan Blair (11)	Tony Parker (8)	AT&T Center; 18,581	25–18
44	January 27	Atlanta	W 105–90	Tim Duncan (21)	Tim Duncan (27)	Tony Parker (8)	AT&T Center; 18,258	26–18
45	January 29	Memphis	W 104–97	Tim Duncan (19)	DeJuan Blair (10)	Tim Duncan, Manu Ginóbili (7)	AT&T Center; 18,088	27–18
46	January 31	Denver	L 89–103	George Hill (17)	Tim Duncan (10)	Manu Ginóbili (9)	AT&T Center; 17,607	27–19

February : 6–5 (home: 2–0; road: 4–5)

Game	Date	Team	Score	High points	High rebounds	High assists	Location Attendance	Record
47	February 3	@ Sacramento	W 115–113	George Hill (23)	Tim Duncan (13)	George Hill (9)	ARCO Arena; 12,934	28–19
48	February 4	@ Portland	L 93–96	Manu Ginóbili (21)	Tim Duncan (12)	Tony Parker (6)	Rose Garden; 20,572	28–20
49	February 6	@ L.A Clippers	W 98–81	George Hill (22)	Antonio McDyess (10)	Tony Parker (14)	Staples Center; 18,258	29–20
50	February 8	@ L.A Lakers	L 89–101	Manu Ginóbili (21)	Tim Duncan (15)	Tony Parker (8)	Staples Center; 18,997	29–21
51	February 11	@ Denver	W 111–92	George Hill, DeJuan Blair (17)	DeJuan Blair (9)	Manu Ginóbili (6)	Pepsi Center; 18,611	30–21
All-Star Break
52	February 17	@ Indiana	W 90–87	Tony Parker (28)	Tim Duncan (26)	Manu Ginóbili (7)	Conseco Fieldhouse; 14,947	31–21
53	February 19	@ Philadelphia	L 94–106	Manu Ginóbili (24)	Tim Duncan (9)	George Hill, Tony Parker (5)	Wachovia Center; 16,376	31–22
54	February 21	@ Detroit	L 101–109	Tim Duncan (29)	Tim Duncan (10)	George Hill, Manu Ginóbili (5)	Palace of Auburn Hills; 20,153	31–23
55	February 24	Oklahoma City	W 95–87	Manu Ginóbili (26)	Tim Duncan (15)	Tim Duncan (6)	AT&T Center; 18,400	32–23
56	February 26	@ Houston	L 104–109	George Hill (26)	Manu Ginóbili (10)	Roger Mason, Jr., Manu Ginóbili (4)	Toyota Center; 18,195	32–24
57	February 28	Phoenix	W 113–110	Manu Ginóbili, Tim Duncan (21)	Tim Duncan (10)	Manu Ginóbili (8)	AT&T Center; 18,581	33–24

March : 12–5 (home: 6–1; road: 6–4)

Game	Date	Team	Score	High points	High rebounds	High assists	Location Attendance	Record
58	March 1	@ New Orleans	W 106–92	George Hill (23)	Tim Duncan (9)	Manu Ginóbili (8)	New Orleans Arena; 13,655	34–24
59	March 5	New Orleans	W 102–91	Tony Parker (20)	DeJuan Blair (12)	Tony Parker (6)	AT&T Center; 18,581	35–24
60	March 6	@ Memphis	W 102–92	Richard Jefferson (18)	Richard Jefferson (6)	Manu Ginóbili (6)	FedEx Forum; 15,928	36–24
61	March 8	@ Cleveland	L 95–97	Manu Ginóbili (38)	Richard Jefferson (9)	Manu Ginóbili, Tim Duncan (5)	Quicken Loans Arena; 20,562	36–25
62	March 10	New York	W 97–87	Manu Ginóbili (28)	Antonio McDyess (12)	Manu Ginóbili (5)	AT&T Center; 18,278	37–25
63	March 12	@ Minnesota	W 103–85	Richard Jefferson, George Hill (19)	Richard Jefferson (9)	George Hill (8)	Target Center; 17,009	38–25
64	March 13	L.A Clippers	W 118–88	Matt Bonner (21)	Richard Jefferson (9)	George Hill (11)	AT&T Center; 18,581	39–25
65	March 16	@ Miami	W 88–76	Manu Ginóbili (22)	Tim Duncan (11)	George Hill, Antonio McDyess (4)	American Airlines Arena; 18,925	40–25
66	March 17	@ Orlando	L 84–110	Richard Jefferson (20)	Antonio McDyess (7)	George Hill (4)	Amway Arena; 17,461	40–26
67	March 19	Golden State	W 147–116	Manu Ginóbili (23)	DeJuan Blair (9)	Manu Ginóbili (11)	AT&T Center; 18,581	41–26
68	March 21	@ Atlanta	L 114–119 (OT)	Manu Ginóbili (38)	Tim Duncan (13)	Manu Ginóbili (6)	Philips Arena; 18,729	41–27
69	March 22	@ Oklahoma City	W 99–96	George Hill (27)	Tim Duncan, Antonio McDyess (7)	Tim Duncan, Manu Ginóbili (5)	Ford Center; 18,203	42–27
70	March 24	L.A Lakers	L 83–92	Manu Ginóbili (24)	Tim Duncan (12)	Tim Duncan (6)	AT&T Center; 18,581	42–28
71	March 26	Cleveland	W 102–97	Manu Ginóbili (30)	George Hill (9)	George Hill, Manu Ginóbili (6)	AT&T Center; 18,581	43–28
72	March 28	@ Boston	W 94–73	Manu Ginóbili (28)	Richard Jefferson, DeJuan Blair (11)	Manu Ginóbili (7)	TD Garden; 18,624	44–28
73	March 29	@ New Jersey	L 84–90	George Hill (19)	Tim Duncan (12)	Richard Jefferson (5)	IZOD Center; 13,053	44–29
74	March 31	Houston	W 119–102	George Hill (30)	Tim Duncan (10)	Manu Ginóbili (10)	AT&T Center; 18,581	45–29

April : 5–3 (home: 2–1; road: 3–2)

Game	Date	Team	Score	High points	High rebounds	High assists	Location Attendance	Record
75	April 2	Orlando	W 112–100	Manu Ginóbili (43)	Tim Duncan (8)	George Hill (9)	AT&T Center; 18,581	46–29
76	April 4	@ L.A Lakers	W 100–81	Manu Ginóbili (32)	Tim Duncan (11)	Manu Ginóbili (5)	Staples Center; 18,997	47–29
77	April 6	@ Sacramento	W 95–86	Richard Jefferson (18)	Antonio McDyess (11)	Manu Ginóbili (6)	ARCO Arena; 17,312	48–29
78	April 7	@ Phoenix	L 101–112	Roger Mason, Jr. (18)	DeJuan Blair (8)	Tony Parker (5)	US Airways Center; 18,422	48–30
79	April 9	Memphis	L 99–107	Manu Ginóbili (26)	Tim Duncan (10)	Tony Parker (8)	AT&T Center; 18,581	48–31
80	April 10	@ Denver	W 104–85	Tim Duncan (18)	Tim Duncan (10)	Manu Ginóbili (7)	Pepsi Center; 19,155	49–31
81	April 12	Minnesota	W 133–111	Keith Bogans (17)	Ian Mahinmi (7)	Tony Parker (7)	AT&T Center; 18,581	50–31
82	April 14	@ Dallas	L 89–96	DeJuan Blair (27)	DeJuan Blair (23)	Roger Mason, Jr. (6)	American Airlines Center; 20,405	50–32

2009–10 season schedule

== Playoffs ==
=== Game log ===
2010 playoff game log
Total: 4–6 (home: 3–2; road: 1–4)
First Round: 4–2 (home: 3–0; road: 1–2)

Game	Date	Team	Score	High points	High rebounds	High assists	Location Attendance	Series
1	April 18	@ Dallas	L 94–100	Tim Duncan (27)	Duncan, McDyess (8)	Manu Ginóbili (6)	American Airlines Center; 20,372	0–1
2	April 21	@ Dallas	W 102–88	Tim Duncan (25)	Tim Duncan (17)	Tony Parker (8)	American Airlines Center; 20,728	1–1
3	April 23	Dallas	W 94–90	Tim Duncan (25)	Antonio McDyess (6)	Manu Ginóbili (7)	AT&T Center; 18,581	2–1
4	April 25	Dallas	W 92–89	George Hill (29)	Tim Duncan (11)	Manu Ginóbili (7)	AT&T Center; 18,581	3–1
5	April 27	@ Dallas	L 81–103	Tony Parker (18)	DeJuan Blair (8)	Tony Parker (6)	American Airlines Center; 20,557	3–2
6	April 29	Dallas	W 97–87	Manu Ginóbili (26)	Tim Duncan (10)	Tony Parker (8)	AT&T Center; 18,581	4–2

Conference Semifinals: 0–4 (home: 0–2; road: 0–2)

Game	Date	Team	Score	High points	High rebounds	High assists	Location Attendance	Record
1	May 3	@ Phoenix	L 102–111	Manu Ginóbili (27)	Tim Duncan (11)	Manu Ginóbili (5)	US Airways Center; 18,422	0–1
2	May 5	@ Phoenix	L 102–110	Tim Duncan (29)	Jefferson, Duncan (10)	Manu Ginóbili (11)	US Airways Center; 18,422	0–2
3	May 7	Phoenix	L 96–110	Manu Ginóbili (27)	Tim Duncan (13)	Ginóbili, Parker (5)	AT&T Center; 18,581	0–3
4	May 9	Phoenix	L 101–107	Tony Parker (22)	Duncan, Jefferson (8)	Manu Ginóbili (9)	AT&T Center; 18,581	0–4

2010 playoff schedule

== Player statistics ==
=== Ragular season ===
Player	POS	GP	GS	MP	REB	AST	STL	BLK	PTS	MPG	RPG	APG	SPG	BPG	PPG
DeJuan Blair	PF	82	23	1,494	526	65	50	39	638	18.2	6.4	.8	.6	.5	7.8
Richard Jefferson	SF	81	70	2,520	356	158	45	40	994	31.1	4.4	2.0	.6	.5	12.3
Keith Bogans	SF	79	50	1,559	176	95	45	12	347	19.7	2.2	1.2	.6	.2	4.4
Roger Mason Jr.	SG	79	5	1,515	162	137	30	14	501	19.2	2.1	1.7	.4	.2	6.3
Tim Duncan	C	78	77	2,438	788	246	45	117	1,395	31.3	10.1	3.2	.6	1.5	17.9
George Hill	PG	78	43	2,276	205	226	69	26	964	29.2	2.6	2.9	.9	.3	12.4
Antonio McDyess	PF	77	50	1,617	455	83	43	32	446	21.0	5.9	1.1	.6	.4	5.8
Manu Ginóbili	SG	75	21	2,150	284	370	103	24	1,237	28.7	3.8	4.9	1.4	.3	16.5
Matt Bonner	PF	65	8	1,161	214	68	30	24	457	17.9	3.3	1.0	.5	.4	7.0
Tony Parker	PG	56	50	1,728	135	317	29	8	894	30.9	2.4	5.7	.5	.1	16.0
Malik Hairston	SG	47	0	317	49	16	4	9	99	6.7	1.0	.3	.1	.2	2.1
Ian Mahinmi	C	26	0	165	52	2	3	8	101	6.3	2.0	.1	.1	.3	3.9
Michael Finley^{†}	SF	25	6	395	38	19	6	4	93	15.8	1.5	.8	.2	.2	3.7
Theo Ratliff^{†}	C	21	3	183	40	9	3	18	34	8.7	1.9	.4	.1	.9	1.6
Garrett Temple^{†}	SG	13	4	193	14	12	8	2	80	14.8	1.1	.9	.6	.2	6.2
Marcus Haislip	SF	10	0	44	10	0	0	2	25	4.4	1.0	.0	.0	.2	2.5
Cedric Jackson^{†}	PG	3	0	25	4	6	3	2	7	8.3	1.3	2.0	1.0	.7	2.3

- ^{†} Denotes player spent time with another team in the season. Stats reflect time with the Spurs only.

=== Playoffs ===
Player	POS	GP	GS	MP	REB	AST	STL	BLK	PTS	MPG	RPG	APG	SPG	BPG	PPG
Tim Duncan	C	10	10	373	99	26	8	17	190	37.3	9.9	2.6	.8	1.7	19.0
Manu Ginóbili	SG	10	10	352	37	60	26	2	194	35.2	3.7	6.0	2.6	.2	19.4
Richard Jefferson	SF	10	10	334	53	18	6	6	94	33.4	5.3	1.8	.6	.6	9.4
Antonio McDyess	PF	10	10	247	68	12	2	7	68	24.7	6.8	1.2	.2	.7	6.8
George Hill	PG	10	8	344	31	7	10	2	134	34.4	3.1	.7	1.0	.2	13.4
Tony Parker	PG	10	2	335	38	54	6	0	173	33.5	3.8	5.4	.6	.0	17.3
Matt Bonner	PF	10	0	173	32	4	1	3	50	17.3	3.2	.4	.1	.3	5.0
DeJuan Blair	PF	10	0	91	39	5	5	4	37	9.1	3.9	.5	.5	.4	3.7
Keith Bogans	SF	8	0	55	6	2	2	1	5	6.9	.8	.3	.3	.1	.6
Roger Mason Jr.	SG	6	0	61	4	2	1	0	3	10.2	.7	.3	.2	.0	.5
Garrett Temple	SG	6	0	15	2	2	1	0	4	2.5	.3	.3	.2	.0	.7
Ian Mahinmi	C	2	0	19	2	0	0	1	9	9.5	1.0	.0	.0	.5	4.5

== Awards, records and milestones ==
=== Awards ===
==== Week/Month ====
- Tim Duncan was named Western Conference Player of the Week for games played from November 23 through November 29.
- Manu Ginóbili was named Western Conference Player of the Week for games played from March 22 through March 28.

==== All-Star ====
- Tim Duncan was voted as an NBA Western Conference All-Star starter. (12th appearance)

==== Season ====
- Tim Duncan was named to the All-NBA Third Team.
- Tim Duncan was named to the NBA All-Defensive Second Team.
- DeJuan Blair was named to the NBA All-Rookie Second Team.

== Transactions ==
=== Trades ===
June 23, 2009	To San Antonio Spurs Richard Jefferson	To Milwaukee Bucks Bruce Bowen, Kurt Thomas, Fabricio Oberto
February 18, 2010	To San Antonio Spurs 2016 2nd Round Draft Pick	To Charlotte Bobcats Theo Ratliff

=== Free agents ===
==== Additions ====
Player	Signed	Former team
Antonio McDyess	July 10	Detroit Pistons
Theo Ratliff	July 25	Philadelphia 76ers
Marcus Haislip	September 7	Unicaja Málaga (Spain)
Keith Bogans	September 21	Milwaukee Bucks
Dwayne Jones	September 23	Charlotte Bobcats
Cedric Jackson	March 10	Erie BayHawks
Garrett Temple	March 13	Sacramento Kings
Alonzo Gee	March 29	Washington Wizards

==== Subtractions ====
Player	Retired
Bruce Bowen	September 3

Player	Waived
Dwayne Jones	October 13
Marcus Haislip	January 22
Michael Finley	March 1
Cedric Jackson	March 20
