= Jason Hart (basketball) =

American basketball player and coach (born 1978)

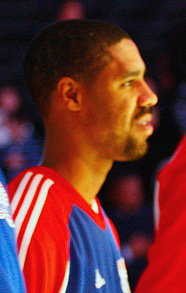

SMU Mustangs
- Title: Assistant coach
- League: ACC

Personal information
- Born: April 29, 1978 (age 48) Los Angeles, California, U.S.
- Listed height: 6 ft 3 in (1.91 m)
- Listed weight: 180 lb (82 kg)

Career information
- High school: Inglewood (Inglewood, California)
- College: Syracuse (1996–2000)
- NBA draft: 2000: 2nd round, 49th overall pick
- Drafted by: Milwaukee Bucks
- Playing career: 2000–2010
- Position: Point guard
- Number: 1, 3, 5, 6, 7, 11
- Coaching career: 2011–present

Career history

Playing
- 2000–2001: Milwaukee Bucks
- 2001–2002: Asheville Altitude
- 2001–2002: San Antonio Spurs
- 2002–2003: Makedonikos
- 2003–2004: San Antonio Spurs
- 2004–2005: Charlotte Bobcats
- 2005–2007: Sacramento Kings
- 2006–2007: Los Angeles Clippers
- 2007–2008: Utah Jazz
- 2008–2009: Los Angeles Clippers
- 2008–2009: Denver Nuggets
- 2009–2010: Minnesota Timberwolves
- 2009–2010: New Orleans Hornets

Coaching
- 2011–2012: Taft HS
- 2012–2013: Pepperdine (assistant)
- 2013–2021: USC (assistant/associate head coach)
- 2021–2024: NBA G League Ignite
- 2024–2026: Kentucky (assistant)
- 2026–present: SMU (assistant)

Career highlights
- First-team All-Big East (2000); Third-team All-Big East (1999)

Career NBA statistics
- Points: 1,623 (4.8 ppg)
- Rebounds: 567 (1.7 rpg)
- Assists: 774 (2.3 apg)
- Stats at NBA.com
- Stats at Basketball Reference

Jason Keema Hart (born April 29, 1978) is an American basketball coach and former professional player who is currently an assistant coach for Southern Methodist University.

== College career ==
From 1996 to 2000, he attended Syracuse University, where he became the first freshman in Big East history to lead the conference in minutes played. As a senior, Hart made the Big East's All-First Team. He finished his college career with the most steals and second most assists in school history, and was later selected to the Syracuse All-Century Basketball team.

== NBA career ==
Hart began his career with the Milwaukee Bucks in the 2000–01 season, but he only saw action in one game, scoring two points.

Starting the 2001–02 season in the newly created NBDL with the Asheville Altitude, he was called in December by the San Antonio Spurs, appearing in 10 games. He played in the Greek A1 League with Makedonikos BC in 2002–03, returning to the Spurs for the 2003–04 season, where he played in 53 games, averaging 3.3 points.

Hart was signed to a three-year, $5 million contract by the Bobcats as a free agent before the 2004–05 season, and made the first steal in Bobcats history in their first game. Previously, in a 126-125 losing effort in their first preseason game, Hart made a three-point shot as time expired to send the game against the Washington Wizards into a second overtime period en route to 19 points.

In the 2004–05 season, Hart set career highs in many categories including: points per game (9.5), assists per game (5.0), and rebounds per game (2.7). He finished third in the league in assist-to-turnover ratio, with 3.6 assists for every turnover. After the season, Hart was traded to the Sacramento Kings.

On March 2, 2007, Hart was waived by the Kings. He was signed a few days later by the Los Angeles Clippers. On July 13, 2007, Hart signed with the Utah Jazz on a two-year, $5 million contract. Originally serving as the backup to Deron Williams, an injury forced him to sit for 8 games. Ronnie Price's solid play during that time nearly removed him from the rotation.

On July 23, 2008, Hart was traded back to the Clippers in exchange for Brevin Knight.

On February 27, 2009, Hart was waived by the Clippers.

On March 3, 2009, Hart was signed by the Nuggets for the remainder of the season.

On September 28, 2009, Hart signed with the Minnesota Timberwolves. He was traded to the Phoenix Suns on December 29, 2009, for Alando Tucker and cash. The Suns immediately waived him. On February 5, 2010, Hart signed a ten-day contract with the New Orleans Hornets. Hart's final NBA game was on February 10, 2010, in a 93–85 win over the Boston Celtics. In his final game, Hart recorded two assists and one rebound.

== Coaching career ==
After his playing career ended, Hart coached AAU basketball in Los Angeles and served as head coach at Taft High School.

On May 12, 2012, Hart was hired as an assistant coach at Pepperdine, under head coach Marty Wilson.

In 2013, he joined Andy Enfield's staff at the University of Southern California.

In 2021, he was named the head coach of the NBA G League Ignite, a developmental team for players coming out of high school that played against other teams in the NBA G League. In March of 2024, G League President Shareef Abdur-Rahim announced that the G League Ignite program would be shut down after the season citing "the changing basketball landscape, including the NCAA's Name, Image and Likeness (NIL) policy and the advent of collectives and the transfer portal" as the main factors.

On April 22, 2024, Hart was hired as an assistant coach under Mark Pope at the University of Kentucky.

In March 2026, Hart announced that he would depart Kentucky to take a position as an assistant coach at SMU, reuniting him with Enfield, who had become the head coach of the Mustangs.

== Personal life ==
Hart was born in Los Angeles, California. He is married to his high school sweetheart, Brandi Hart. They have two sons - Jason Jr. and Justin. Hart's cousin Brandon Triche also played for the Syracuse Orange men's basketball team.

== NBA career statistics ==
Legend
| GP | Games played | GS | Games started | MPG | Minutes per game |
| FG% | Field goal percentage | 3P% | 3-point field goal percentage | FT% | Free throw percentage |
| RPG | Rebounds per game | APG | Assists per game | SPG | Steals per game |
| BPG | Blocks per game | PPG | Points per game | **Bold** | Career high |

=== Regular season ===
| Year | Team | GP | GS | MPG | FG% | 3P% | FT% | RPG | APG | SPG | BPG | PPG |
|---|---|---|---|---|---|---|---|---|---|---|---|---|
| 2000–01 | Milwaukee | 1 | 0 | 10.0 | **1.000** | .000 | .000 | .0 | 1.0 | .0 | .0 | 2.0 |
| 2001–02 | San Antonio | 10 | 0 | 9.2 | .526 | .000 | **1.000** | 1.3 | 1.2 | .7 | .1 | 2.6 |
| 2003–04 | San Antonio | 53 | 5 | 12.5 | .447 | .222 | .767 | 1.5 | 1.5 | .5 | .1 | 3.3 |
| 2004–05 | Charlotte | **74** | **27** | 25.5 | .449 | .368 | .785 | 2.7 | **5.0** | 1.3 | .2 | **9.5** |
| 2005–06 | Sacramento | 66 | 0 | 12.4 | .389 | .290 | .661 | 1.1 | 1.1 | .5 | .1 | 3.3 |
| 2006–07 | Sacramento | 13 | 0 | 7.7 | .500 | **.500** | .909 | 1.2 | .8 | .2 | .0 | 3.3 |
| 2006–07 | L.A. Clippers | 23 | 22 | **32.4** | .438 | .174 | .889 | **3.6** | 4.0 | **1.8** | .0 | 9.0 |
| 2007–08 | Utah | 57 | 0 | 10.6 | .322 | .355 | .844 | 1.0 | 1.5 | .5 | .1 | 2.9 |
| 2008–09 | L.A. Clippers | 28 | 2 | 11.1 | .298 | .000 | .789 | 1.5 | 1.5 | .4 | .1 | 2.3 |
| 2008–09 | Denver | 11 | 0 | 3.3 | .500 | .000 | .750 | .4 | .5 | .0 | .0 | 1.2 |
| 2009–10 | Minnesota | 1 | 0 | 5.0 | .000 | .000 | .000 | .0 | 1.0 | 1.0 | .0 | .0 |
| 2009–10 | New Orleans | 4 | 0 | 4.3 | **1.000** | .000 | .000 | .5 | 1.3 | .3 | **.3** | .5 |
| Career | | 341 | 56 | 15.5 | .417 | .315 | .788 | 1.7 | 2.3 | .7 | .1 | 4.8 |

=== Playoffs ===
| Year | Team | GP | GS | MPG | FG% | 3P% | FT% | RPG | APG | SPG | BPG | PPG |
|---|---|---|---|---|---|---|---|---|---|---|---|---|
| 2004 | San Antonio | 7 | 0 | 8.9 | **.550** | .000 | .000 | **.4** | .1 | **.7** | .0 | **3.1** |
| 2006 | Sacramento | 5 | 0 | **10.4** | .308 | .000 | **1.000** | **.4** | **.6** | .6 | .0 | 2.0 |
| 2008 | Utah | 2 | 0 | 3.0 | .500 | .000 | .000 | .0 | .0 | .0 | .0 | 1.0 |
| 2009 | Denver | **9** | 0 | 2.1 | .500 | .000 | .000 | .3 | **.6** | .2 | **.1** | .2 |
| Career | | 23 | 0 | 6.0 | .459 | .000 | 1.000 | .3 | .4 | .4 | .0 | 1.6 |

== See also ==
- List of NCAA Division I men's basketball career steals leaders
