= 2009–10 Utah Jazz season =

NBA professional basketball team season

- Head coach: Jerry Sloan
- General manager: Kevin O'Connor
- Owner: Gail Miller
- Arena: EnergySolutions Arena

Results
- Record: 53–29 (.646)
- Place: Division: 2nd (Northwest); Conference: 5th (Western)
- Playoff finish: Conference Semifinals (lost to Lakers 0–4)
- Stats at Basketball Reference

Local media
- Television: FSN Utah
- Radio: KFNZ; KBEE

The 2009–10 Utah Jazz season was the 36th season of the franchise in the National Basketball Association (NBA).

In the playoffs, the Jazz defeated the Denver Nuggets in six games in the First Round, before getting swept by the eventual and back-to-back NBA champion, the Los Angeles Lakers, in the Semi-finals. This marked the third consecutive season the Jazz had their season ended by the Lakers.

Game 4 of the conference semi-finals was Jerry Sloan's final playoff appearance as head coach as he resigned the next season. Following the season, both Carlos Boozer and Kyle Korver signed as free agents with the Chicago Bulls. Also this was Deron Williams' final full season with the Jazz as he was traded to the New Jersey Nets the following February.

The Jazz would not return to the playoffs until 2012.

== Key dates ==
- June 25 – The 2009 NBA draft took place in New York City.
- July 8 – The free agency period started.

== Roster ==
2009–10 Utah Jazz roster
Players

Pos.	No.	Player	Height	Weight	DOB	From
PF	5	Carlos Boozer	6 ft 9 in (2.06 m)	266 lb (121 kg)	1981–11–20	Duke
C	44	Kyrylo Fesenko	7 ft 1 in (2.16 m)	300 lb (136 kg)	1986–12–24	Ukraine
PG	15	Sundiata Gaines	6 ft 1 in (1.85 m)	195 lb (88 kg)	1986–04–18	Georgia
SG	6	Othyus Jeffers	6 ft 5 in (1.96 m)	200 lb (91 kg)	1985–08–05	Robert Morris (IL)
SF	47	Andrei Kirilenko	6 ft 9 in (2.06 m)	225 lb (102 kg)	1981–02–18	Russia
SG	26	Kyle Korver	6 ft 7 in (2.01 m)	210 lb (95 kg)	1981–03–17	Creighton
C	41	Kosta Koufos	7 ft 0 in (2.13 m)	245 lb (111 kg)	1989–02–24	Ohio State
SG	23	Wesley Matthews	6 ft 5 in (1.96 m)	220 lb (100 kg)	1986–10–14	Marquette
SF	34	C. J. Miles	6 ft 6 in (1.98 m)	227 lb (103 kg)	1987–03–18	Skyline HS
PF	24	Paul Millsap	6 ft 8 in (2.03 m)	250 lb (113 kg)	1985–02–10	Louisiana Tech
C	13	Mehmet Okur	6 ft 11 in (2.11 m)	263 lb (119 kg)	1979–05–26	Turkey
PG	17	Ronnie Price	6 ft 2 in (1.88 m)	184 lb (83 kg)	1983–06–21	Utah Valley
PG	8	Deron Williams	6 ft 3 in (1.91 m)	207 lb (94 kg)	1984–06–26	Illinois

Coaches
Head coach
- Jerry Sloan
Assistant(s)
- Tyrone Corbin
- Phil Johnson
- Scott Layden
- Mark McKown

Legend
- (DP) Unsigned draft pick
- (FA) Free agent
- (S) Suspended
- Injured

Roster
Updated: March 23, 2010

== Pre-season ==
2009 Pre-season game log: 0–0–0 (home: 0–0–0; road: 0–0–0)
#	Date	Visitor	Score	Home	OT	Decision	Attendance	Record	Recap
1	October 6 (in London, UK)	Utah Jazz		Chicago Bulls
2	October 8 (in Madrid, Spain)	Utah Jazz		Real Madrid (Spain)

== Regular season ==
=== Standings ===
Northwest Division	W	L	PCT	GB	Home	Road	Div
y-Denver Nuggets	53	29	.646	–	34–7	19–22	12–4
x-Utah Jazz	53	29	.646	–	32–9	21–20	8–8
x-Portland Trail Blazers	50	32	.610	3	26–15	24–17	8–8
x-Oklahoma City Thunder	50	32	.610	3	27–14	23–18	9–7
Minnesota Timberwolves	15	67	.183	38	10–31	5–36	3–13

#	Western Conference				
#	Team	W	L	PCT	GB
1	c-Los Angeles Lakers	57	25	.695	–
2	y-Dallas Mavericks	55	27	.671	2
3	x-Phoenix Suns	54	28	.659	3
4	y-Denver Nuggets	53	29	.646	4
5	x-Utah Jazz	53	29	.646	4
6	x-Portland Trail Blazers	50	32	.610	7
7	x-San Antonio Spurs	50	32	.610	7
8	x-Oklahoma City Thunder	50	32	.610	7
9	Houston Rockets	42	40	.512	15
10	Memphis Grizzlies	40	42	.488	17
11	New Orleans Hornets	37	45	.451	20
12	Los Angeles Clippers	29	53	.354	28
13	Golden State Warriors	26	56	.317	31
14	Sacramento Kings	25	57	.305	32
15	Minnesota Timberwolves	15	67	.183	42

=== Game log ===
2009–10 game log
October: 1–1 (home: 1–0; road: 0–1)

Game	Date	Team	Score	High points	High rebounds	High assists	Location Attendance	Record
1	October 28	@ Denver	L 105–114	Deron Williams (28)	Carlos Boozer (11)	Deron Williams (13)	Pepsi Center; 19,155	0–1
2	October 30	LA Clippers	W 111–98	Paul Millsap (23)	Carlos Boozer (12)	Deron Williams (9)	EnergySolutions Arena; 19,911	1–1

November: 9–6 (home: 6–3; road: 3–3)

Game	Date	Team	Score	High points	High rebounds	High assists	Location Attendance	Record
3	November 2	Houston	L 96–113	Mehmet Okur (21)	Carlos Boozer (11)	Deron Williams (8)	EnergySolutions Arena; 19,911	1–2
4	November 3	@ Dallas	L 85–96	Deron Williams (22)	Mehmet Okur (14)	Mehmet Okur, Deron Williams (5)	American Airlines Center; 19,725	1–3
5	November 5	San Antonio	W 113–99	Carlos Boozer, Deron Williams (27)	Carlos Boozer (17)	Deron Williams (9)	EnergySolutions Arena; 19,797	2–3
6	November 7	Sacramento	L 99–104	Deron Williams (29)	Carlos Boozer (17)	Deron Williams (15)	EnergySolutions Arena; 18,825	2–4
7	November 9	@ NY Knicks	W 95–93	Andrei Kirilenko, Carlos Boozer (23)	Carlos Boozer (14)	Deron Williams (16)	Madison Square Garden; 19,355	3–4
8	November 11	@ Boston	L 86–105	Ronnie Brewer, Deron Williams (13)	Paul Millsap (13)	Deron Williams, Eric Maynor (4)	TD Garden; 18,624	3–5
9	November 13	@ Philadelphia	W 112–90	Carlos Boozer (24)	Carlos Boozer (12)	Eric Maynor (11)	Wachovia Center; 10,738	4–5
10	November 14	@ Cleveland	L 103–107	Carlos Boozer (25)	Carlos Boozer (12)	Ronnie Brewer, Andrei Kirilenko (5)	Quicken Loans Arena; 20,562	4–6
11	November 18	Toronto	W 104–91	Carlos Boozer (22)	Carlos Boozer (18)	Deron Williams (9)	EnergySolutions Arena; 17,879	5–6
12	November 19	@ San Antonio	W 90–83	Deron Williams (21)	Carlos Boozer (11)	Deron Williams (9)	AT&T Center; 17,519	6-6
13	November 21	Detroit	W 100–97 (OT)	Carlos Boozer, Andrei Kirilenko (22)	Andrei Kirilenko (10)	Deron Williams (11)	EnergySolutions Arena; 18,355	7–6
14	November 24	Oklahoma City	L 94–104	Carlos Boozer (26)	Carlos Boozer, Andrei Kirilenko, Deron Williams (7)	Deron Williams (9)	EnergySolutions Arena; 17,937	7-7
15	November 26	Chicago	W 105–86	Carlos Boozer (28)	Paul Millsap (9)	Ronnie Brewer, Andrei Kirilenko, Deron Williams (6)	EnergySolutions Arena; 18,045	8–7
16	November 28	Portland	W 108–92	Carlos Boozer (26)	Carlos Boozer (12)	Deron Williams (15)	EnergySolutions Arena; 18,051	9–7
17	November 30	Memphis	W 120–93	Ronnie Brewer (25)	Carlos Boozer (15)	Carlos Boozer (7)	EnergySolutions Arena; 18,469	10–7

December: 8–7 (home: 5–1; road: 3–6)

Game	Date	Team	Score	High points	High rebounds	High assists	Location Attendance	Record
18	December 4	Indiana	W 96–87	Carlos Boozer (35)	Carlos Boozer (13)	Deron Williams (12)	EnergySolutions Arena; 19,347	11–7
19	December 5	@ Minnesota	L 101–108	Carlos Boozer (21)	Carlos Boozer (13)	Deron Williams (11)	Target Center; 18,466	11–8
20	December 7	San Antonio	W 104–101	Carlos Boozer (27)	Ronnie Brewer (10)	Deron Williams (11)	EnergySolutions Arena; 17,565	12–8
21	December 9	@ LA Lakers	L 77–101	Deron Williams (17)	Carlos Boozer (12)	Deron Williams (8)	Staples Center; 18,997	12–9
22	December 10	Orlando	W 120–111	Deron Williams (32)	Carlos Boozer (14)	Deron Williams (15)	EnergySolutions Arena; 18,735	13–9
23	December 12	LA Lakers	W 102–94	Deron Williams (21)	Carlos Boozer, Ronnie Brewer (8)	Deron Williams (11)	EnergySolutions Arena; 19,911	14–9
24	December 14	Minnesota	L 108–110	Deron Williams (38)	Carlos Boozer (14)	Deron Williams (13)	EnergySolutions Arena; 18,090	14–10
25	December 16	@ New Jersey	W 108–92	Carlos Boozer (26)	Carlos Boozer (10)	Deron Williams (14)	IZOD Center; 11,476	15–10
26	December 18	@ Atlanta	L 83–96	Andre Kirilenko (13)	Eric Maynor (7)	Eric Maynor (7)	Philips Arena; 17,501	15–11
27	December 19	@ Charlotte	W 110–102	Deron Williams (23)	Carlos Boozer (11)	Deron Williams (10)	Time Warner Cable Arena; 14,963	16–11
28	December 21	@ Orlando	L 99–104	Paul Millsap (20)	Mehmet Okur (9)	Deron Williams (12)	Amway Arena; 17,461	16–12
29	December 23	@ Miami	L 70–80	Deron Williams (18)	Carlos Boozer (8)	Deron Williams (6)	American Airlines Arena; 19,600	16–13
30	December 26	Philadelphia	W 97–76	Deron Williams (27)	Carlos Boozer, Paul Millsap (11)	Deron Williams (8)	EnergySolutions Arena; 19,911	17–13
31	December 30	@ Minnesota	W 107–103	Deron Williams (21)	Carlos Boozer (12)	Deron Williams (12)	Target Center; 14,123	18–13
32	December 31	@ Oklahoma City	L 86–87	Carlos Boozer (17)	Mehmet Okur (11)	Ronnie Price (10)	Ford Center; 18,203	18–14

January: 10–4 (home: 7–2; road: 3–2)

Game	Date	Team	Score	High points	High rebounds	High assists	Location Attendance	Record
33	January 2	Denver	L 95–105	Carlos Boozer (18)	Carlos Boozer (10)	Deron Williams (6)	EnergySolutions Arena; 19,911	18–15
34	January 4	New Orleans	L 87–91	Carlos Boozer (18)	Carlos Boozer (14)	Deron Williams (11)	EnergySolutions Arena; 19,911	18–16
35	January 6	Memphis	W 117–94	C. J. Miles (24)	Paul Millsap (9)	Ronnie Brewer (10)	EnergySolutions Arena; 19,008	19–16
36	January 8	@ Memphis	L 89–91	Mehmet Okur (16)	Carlos Boozer (12)	Ronnie Price (9)	FedExForum; 14,213	19–17
37	January 9	@ Dallas	W 111–93	Deron Williams (20)	Andre Kirilenko (8)	Deron Williams (9)	American Airlines Center; 19,922	20–17
38	January 11	Miami	W 118–89	Carlos Boozer (25)	Carlos Boozer (11)	Deron Williams (10)	EnergySolutions Arena; 19,284	21–17
39	January 14	Cleveland	W 97–96	Carlos Boozer (19)	Carlos Boozer (13)	Carlos Boozer (6)	EnergySolutions Arena; 19,911	22–17
40	January 16	Milwaukee	W 112–95	C. J. Miles (19)	Carlos Boozer, Mehmet Okur (12)	Ronnie Price (7)	EnergySolutions Arena; 19,669	23–17
41	January 17	@ Denver	L 112–119	Deron Williams (23)	Carlos Boozer (13)	Deron Williams (13)	Pepsi Center; 19,519	23–18
42	January 20	@ San Antonio	W 105–98	Carlos Boozer (31)	Carlos Boozer (13)	Deron Williams (10)	AT&T Center; 17,584	24–18
43	January 23	New Jersey	W 116–83	Carlos Boozer (22)	Mehmet Okur (11)	Deron Williams (8)	EnergySolutions Arena; 19,911	25–18
44	January 25	Phoenix	W 124–115	Andre Kirilenko (25)	Carlos Boozer (20)	Deron Williams (11)	EnergySolutions Arena; 19,911	26–18
45	January 27	@ Portland	W 106–95	Deron Williams (24)	Paul Millsap (12)	Ronnie Brewer, Deron Williams (7)	Rose Garden; 20,384	27–18
46	January 29	Sacramento	W 101–94	Paul Millsap (32)	Paul Millsap (14)	Paul Millsap (7)	EnergySolutions Arena; 19,480	28–18

February: 10–3 (home: 5–2; road: 5–1)

Game	Date	Team	Score	High points	High rebounds	High assists	Location Attendance	Record
47	February 1	Dallas	W 104–92	Paul Millsap (25)	Paul Millsap (9)	Deron Williams (15)	EnergySolutions Arena; 19,911	29–18
48	February 3	Portland	W 118–105	Mehmet Okur (28)	Paul Millsap (9)	Deron Williams (13)	EnergySolutions Arena; 19,911	30–18
49	February 6	Denver	W 116–106	Andre Kirilenko, Deron Williams (22)	Carlos Boozer (13)	Deron Williams (9)	EnergySolutions Arena; 19,911	31–18
50	February 9	@ LA Clippers	W 109–99	Carlos Boozer (34)	Carlos Boozer (14)	Deron Williams (11)	Staples Center; 15,467	32–18
51	February 10	LA Lakers	L 81–96	Andre Kirilenko (17)	Carlos Boozer (10)	Deron Williams (10)	EnergySolutions Arena; 19,911	32–19
52	February 16	@ Houston	W 104–95	Mehmet Okur (21)	Paul Millsap (12)	Deron Williams (15)	Toyota Center; 14,942	33–19
53	February 17	@ New Orleans	W 98–90	Paul Millsap (24)	Carlos Boozer (15)	Deron Williams (10)	New Orleans Arena; 13,561	34–19
54	February 19	@ Golden State	W 100–89	Carlos Boozer (30)	Carlos Boozer (16)	Deron Williams (11)	Oracle Arena; 18,322	35–19
55	February 21	@ Portland	W 93–89 (OT)	Carlos Boozer (22)	Carlos Boozer (23)	Deron Williams (12)	Rose Garden; 20,565	36–19
56	February 22	Atlanta	L 100–105	Paul Millsap (14)	Carlos Boozer (10)	Carlos Boozer (8)	EnergySolutions Arena; 19,911	36–20
57	February 24	Charlotte	W 102–93	Carlos Boozer (33)	Carlos Boozer (16)	Deron Williams (12)	EnergySolutions Arena; 19,911	37–20
58	February 26	@ Sacramento	L 99–103	Carlos Boozer (26)	Mehmet Okur (11)	Deron Williams (13)	ARCO Arena; 12,938	37–21
59	February 27	Houston	W 133–110	Deron Williams (35)	Carlos Boozer, Mehmet Okur (8)	Deron Williams (13)	EnergySolutions Arena; 19,911	38–21

March: 12–5 (home: 7–0; road: 5–5)

Game	Date	Team	Score	High points	High rebounds	High assists	Location Attendance	Record
60	March 1	@ LA Clippers	L 104–108	Carlos Boozer (20)	Mehmet Okur (13)	Deron Williams (13)	Staples Center; 15,422	38–22
61	March 4	@ Phoenix	W 116–108	Deron Williams (27)	Carlos Boozer (15)	Deron Williams (9)	US Airways Center; 17,912	39–22
62	March 6	LA Clippers	W 107–85	Mehmet Okur (27)	Carlos Boozer (17)	Deron Williams (10)	EnergySolutions Arena; 19,911	40–22
63	March 9	@ Chicago	W 132–108	Deron Williams (28)	Carlos Boozer (10)	Deron Williams (17)	United Center; 18,451	41–22
64	March 10	@ Detroit	W 115–104	Paul Millsap, Mehmet Okur, Deron Williams (18)	Carlos Boozer (12)	Deron Williams (12)	Palace of Auburn Hills; 16,908	42–22
65	March 12	@ Milwaukee	L 87–95	Carlos Boozer (26)	Carlos Boozer (14)	Deron Williams (9)	Bradley Center; 14,917	42–23
66	March 14	@ Oklahoma City	L 111–119	Wesley Matthews (29)	Carlos Boozer (11)	Deron Williams (14)	Ford Center; 18,203	42–24
67	March 15	Washington	W 112–89	Carlos Boozer (23)	Carlos Boozer (11)	Deron Williams (9)	EnergySolutions Arena; 19,611	43–24
68	March 17	Minnesota	W 122–100	Paul Millsap (21)	Carlos Boozer, Paul Millsap (11)	Deron Williams (11)	EnergySolutions Arena; 19,851	44–24
69	March 19	@ Phoenix	L 100–110	Carlos Boozer (23)	Carlos Boozer (16)	Deron Williams (6)	US Airways Center; 18,422	44–25
70	March 20	New Orleans	W 106–86	Paul Millsap (22)	Paul Millsap (15)	Deron Williams (11)	EnergySolutions Arena; 18,766	45–25
71	March 22	Boston	W 110–97	C. J. Miles (23)	Mehmet Okur (15)	Deron Williams (11)	EnergySolutions Arena; 19,911	46–25
72	March 24	@ Toronto	W 113–87	Carlos Boozer, Deron Williams (18)	Carlos Boozer (11)	Deron Williams (16)	Air Canada Centre; 16,178	47–25
73	March 26	@ Indiana	L 106–122	Mehmet Okur (27)	Mehmet Okur (12)	Deron Williams (12)	Conseco Fieldhouse; 15,463	47–26
74	March 27	@ Washington	W 103–87	Carlos Boozer, Mehmet Okur (22)	Mehmet Okur (11)	Deron Williams (12)	Verizon Center; 15,312	48–26
75	March 29	NY Knicks	W 103–98	Carlos Boozer (26)	Carlos Boozer (14)	Deron Williams (14)	EnergySolutions Arena; 19,911	49–26
76	March 31	Golden State	W 128–104	Carlos Boozer (25)	Carlos Boozer (13)	Deron Williams (19)	EnergySolutions Arena; 19,617	50–26

April : 3–3 (home: 1–1; road: 2–2)

Game	Date	Team	Score	High points	High rebounds	High assists	Location Attendance	Record
77	April 2	@ LA Lakers	L 92–106	Carlos Boozer, Deron Williams (20)	Carlos Boozer (18)	Deron Williams (10)	Staples Center; 18,997	50–27
78	April 6	Oklahoma City	W 140–139 (OT)	Deron Williams (42)	Carlos Boozer (15)	Deron Williams (10)	EnergySolutions Arena; 19,911	51–27
79	April 7	@ Houston	L 96–113	Carlos Boozer (18)	Carlos Boozer, Paul Millsap (11)	Deron Williams (7)	Toyota Center; 15,004	51–28
80	April 9	@ New Orleans	W 114–103	Deron Williams (27)	Paul Millsap (12)	Deron Williams (16)	New Orleans Arena; 16,624	52–28
81	April 13	@ Golden State	W 103–94	Mehmet Okur (23)	Paul Millsap (24)	Deron Williams (7)	Oracle Arena; 19,230	53–28
82	April 14	Phoenix	L 86–100	Deron Williams (24)	Mehmet Okur (11)	Deron Williams (6)	EnergySolutions Arena; 19,911	53–29

2009–10 season schedule

== Playoffs ==
=== Game log ===
2010 playoff game log
Total: 4–6 (home: 3–2; road: 1–4)
First Round: 4–2 (home: 3–0; road: 1–2)

Game	Date	Team	Score	High points	High rebounds	High assists	Location Attendance	Series
1	April 17	@ Denver	L 113–126	Deron Williams (26)	Paul Millsap (10)	Deron Williams (11)	Pepsi Center; 19,155	0–1
2	April 19	@ Denver	W 114–111	Deron Williams (33)	Carlos Boozer (15)	Deron Williams (14)	Pepsi Center; 19,155	1–1
3	April 23	Denver	W 105–93	Deron Williams (24)	Paul Millsap (19)	Deron Williams (10)	EnergySolutions Arena; 19,911	2–1
4	April 25	Denver	W 117–106	Carlos Boozer (31)	Carlos Boozer (13)	Deron Williams (13)	EnergySolutions Arena; 19,911	3–1
5	April 28	@ Denver	L 102–116	Deron Williams (34)	Carlos Boozer (16)	Deron Williams (9)	Pepsi Center; 19,155	3–2
6	April 30	Denver	W 112–104	Wesley Matthews (23)	Carlos Boozer (20)	Deron Williams (10)	EnergySolutions Arena; 19,911	4–2

Conference Semifinals: 0–4 (home: 0–2; road: 0–2)

Game	Date	Team	Score	High points	High rebounds	High assists	Location Attendance	Record
1	May 2	@ L. A. Lakers	L 99–104	Deron Williams (24)	Carlos Boozer (12)	Deron Williams (8)	STAPLES Center; 18,997	0–1
2	May 4	@ L. A. Lakers	L 103–111	Paul Millsap (26)	Carlos Boozer (12)	Deron Williams (9)	STAPLES Center; 18,997	0–2
3	May 8	L. A. Lakers	L 110–111	Deron Williams (28)	Carlos Boozer (14)	Deron Williams (9)	EnergySolutions Arena; 19,911	0–3
4	May 10	L. A. Lakers	L 96–111	Deron Williams, Paul Millsap (21)	Carlos Boozer (14)	Deron Williams (9)	EnergySolutions Arena; 19,911	0–4

2010 playoff schedule

== Player statistics ==
Legend
GP	Games played	GS	Games started	MPG	Minutes per game
FG%	Field-goal percentage	3P%	3-point field-goal percentage	FT%	Free-throw percentage
RPG	Rebounds per game	APG	Assists per game	SPG	Steals per game
BPG	Blocks per game	PPG	Points per game

=== Regular season ===
Player	GP	GS	MPG	FG%	3P%	FT%	RPG	APG	SPG	BPG	PPG
Carlos Boozer	78	78	34.3	.562	.000	.742	11.2	3.2	1.08	0.46	19.5
Kyrylo Fesenko	49	5	8.3	.547	.000	.421	1.8	0.3	0.12	0.39	2.6
Sundiata Gaines	32	0	6.8	.463	.269	.500	0.9	1.2	0.38	0.00	3.3
Othyus Jeffers	14	0	5.2	.414	.000	.684	1.4	0.1	0.29	0.00	2.6
Andrei Kirilenko	58	35	29.0	.506	.292	.744	4.6	2.7	1.43	1.22	11.9
Kyle Korver	52	0	18.3	.493	.536	.796	2.1	1.7	0.50	0.23	7.2
Kosta Koufos	36	0	4.8	.468	.000	.600	1.3	0.2	0.06	0.11	1.5
Wesley Matthews	82	48	24.7	.483	.382	.829	2.3	1.5	0.78	0.18	9.4
C. J. Miles	63	28	23.8	.429	.341	.695	2.7	1.7	0.92	.27	9.9
Paul Millsap	82	2	27.8	.538	.111	.693	6.8	1.6	0.78	1.21	11.6
Mehmet Okur	73	73	29.4	.458	.385	.820	7.1	1.6	0.52	1.11	13.5
Ronnie Price	60	4	13.4	.405	.286	.695	1.2	2.1	0.67	0.22	4.3
Deron Williams	76	76	36.9	.469	.371	.801	4.0	10.5	1.26	0.21	18.7

Source: ESPN.com

=== Playoffs ===
Player	GP	GS	MPG	FG%	3P%	FT%	RPG	APG	SPG	BPG	PPG
Carlos Boozer	10	10	40.2	.530	.	.543	13.2	3.0	.4	.7	19.7
Kyrylo Fesenko	10	9	18.1	.433	.	.333	3.9	1.2	.0	.5	3.3
Sundiata Gaines	5	0	1.4	.833	1.000	.000	.4	.0	.0	.0	2.2
Othyus Jeffers	6	0	1.7	.167	.	.000	.2	.0	.0	.0	.3
Andrei Kirilenko	2	0	15.0	.500	.000	1.000	3.0	.0	.5	.5	5.5
Kyle Korver	10	0	21.0	.525	.478	.889	1.1	1.3	.5	.0	8.3
Kosta Koufos	9	0	3.4	.400	.	.	1.0	.0	.0	.1	.9
Wesley Matthews	10	10	37.1	.386	.357	.813	4.4	1.7	1.8	.5	13.2
C. J. Miles	10	10	33.7	.443	.326	.897	2.5	2.8	.6	.6	14.4
Paul Millsap	10	0	32.3	.574	.000	.690	8.8	2.2	1.1	1.4	18.0
Mehmet Okur	1	1	11.0	1.000	1.000	1.000	2.0	.0	.0	.0	7.0
Ronnie Price	10	0	9.0	.292	.286	.500	1.0	1.4	.4	.1	2.0
Deron Williams	10	10	39.8	.450	.392	.802	2.7	10.2	1.0	.4	24.3

== Awards, records and milestones ==
=== Awards ===
==== Week/Month ====
- Carlos Boozer was named Western Conference Player of the Week twice (Nov. 30 – Dec. 6 and Feb. 15 – Feb. 21).
- Deron Williams was named Western Conference Player of the Week for the week of December 7.
- Carlos Boozer was named Western Conference Player of the Month for February. During this month, he averaged 21.2 points on .604 shooting, along with 13.0 rebounds per game.

==== All-Star ====
- Deron Williams was selected to play in the All-Star Game for the first time in his career.

==== Season ====
- Deron Williams was named to the All-NBA Second Team.

=== Records ===
- Kyle Korver broke the NBA record for 3-pt field goal percentage, by making 53.6% of his attempts.

=== Milestones ===
- On January 4, 2010, Deron Williams passed the 3000 assists mark in a loss to the New Orleans Hornets.
