= 2009–10 Minnesota Timberwolves season =

NBA professional basketball team season

- Head coach: Kurt Rambis
- President: David Kahn
- General manager: David Kahn
- Owner: Glen Taylor
- Arena: Target Center

Results
- Record: 15–67 (.183)
- Place: Division: 5th (Northwest); Conference: 15th (Western)
- Playoff finish: Did not qualify
- Stats at Basketball Reference

Local media
- Television: Fox Sports North; KSTC
- Radio: KFAN

The 2009–10 Minnesota Timberwolves season was the 21st season of the franchise in the National Basketball Association.

== Key dates ==
- June 25 – The 2009 NBA draft took place in New York City.
- July 8 – The free agency period started.

== Draft ==
Round	Pick	Player	Position	Nationality	College/Team
1	5	Ricky Rubio(from Washington)	PG	Spain	DKV Joventut (Spain)
1	6	Jonny Flynn	PG	United States	Syracuse (So.)
1	18	Ty Lawson(from Miami, traded to Denver)	PG	United States	North Carolina (Jr.)
1	28	Wayne Ellington(from Boston)	SG	United States	North Carolina (Jr.)
2	45	Nick Calathes(from Philadelphia via Miami, traded to Dallas)	PG	United States; Greece	Florida (So.)
2	47	Henk Norel(from Miami)	PF	Netherlands	DKV Joventut (Spain)

The Timberwolves, thanks to various trades, had six picks in the 2009 draft. They had four first-round picks at the #5, #6, #18, and #28 slots, as well as the #45 and #47 picks in the second.

Their first pick, which originally belonged to the Washington Wizards, was Spanish teenage point guard sensation Ricky Rubio, followed immediately by another point guard, Syracuse sophomore Jonny Flynn, using their own pick. At #18, they picked yet another point guard, North Carolina's Ty Lawson, whose draft rights would later be traded to the Denver Nuggets. Their final first-rounder was Lawson's backcourt mate, shooting guard Wayne Ellington.

In the second round, the Timberwolves selected a fourth point guard, Nick Calathes of Florida. The team's final selection was Henk Norel, a Dutch power forward who was Rubio's teammate at Spanish club power Joventut Badalona.

The glut of point guards was partially resolved when the Timberwolves traded the rights to Lawson to the Denver Nuggets and Calathes to the Dallas Mavericks. In any event, Calathes was not expected to join the NBA in the near future, as he has signed a multimillion-dollar contract with Panathinaikos, one of the strongest clubs in his ancestral home of Greece.

== Roster ==
2009–10 Minnesota Timberwolves roster
Players

Pos.	No.	Player	Height	Weight	DOB	From
SG	22	Corey Brewer	6 ft 9 in (2.06 m)	188 lb (85 kg)	1986-03-05	Florida
PF	14	Brian Cardinal	6 ft 8 in (2.03 m)	245 lb (111 kg)	1977-05-02	Purdue
SG	19	Wayne Ellington	6 ft 4 in (1.93 m)	200 lb (91 kg)	1987-11-29	North Carolina
PG	10	Jonny Flynn	6 ft 0 in (1.83 m)	185 lb (84 kg)	1989-02-06	Syracuse
SF	8	Ryan Gomes	6 ft 7 in (2.01 m)	245 lb (111 kg)	1982-09-01	Providence
C	1	Ryan Hollins	7 ft 0 in (2.13 m)	230 lb (104 kg)	1984-10-10	UCLA
C	15	Nathan Jawai (DL)	6 ft 10 in (2.08 m)	280 lb (127 kg)	1986-10-10	Midland College
C	25	Al Jefferson	6 ft 10 in (2.08 m)	265 lb (120 kg)	1985-01-04	Prentiss HS (MS)
PF	42	Kevin Love	6 ft 10 in (2.08 m)	260 lb (118 kg)	1988-09-07	UCLA
C	31	Darko Miličić	7 ft 0 in (2.13 m)	275 lb (125 kg)	1985-06-20	Serbia
SF	11	Aleksandar Pavlović	6 ft 7 in (2.01 m)	235 lb (107 kg)	1983-11-15	Serbia
C	4	Oleksiy Pecherov (injured)	7 ft 0 in (2.13 m)	234 lb (106 kg)	1985-12-08	Ukraine
PG	7	Ramon Sessions	6 ft 3 in (1.91 m)	190 lb (86 kg)	1986-04-11	Nevada
SF	3	Damien Wilkins	6 ft 6 in (1.98 m)	225 lb (102 kg)	1980-01-11	Georgia

Coaches
Head coach
- Kurt Rambis
Assistant(s)
- J. B. Bickerstaff
- Bill Laimbeer
- Reggie Theus
- Dave Wohl
- Gregg Farnam (trainer)

Legend
- (DP) Unsigned draft pick
- (FA) Free agent
- (S) Suspended
- (DL) On assignment to D-League affiliate
- Injured

Roster
Updated: April 14, 2010

== Pre-season ==
2009 Pre-season game log: 0–0–0 (Home: 0–0–0; Road: 0–0–0)
#	Date	Visitor	Score	Home	OT	Decision	Attendance	Record	Recap
1	October 23 (in Sioux Falls, South Dakota)	Toronto Raptors		Minnesota Timberwolves

== Regular season ==
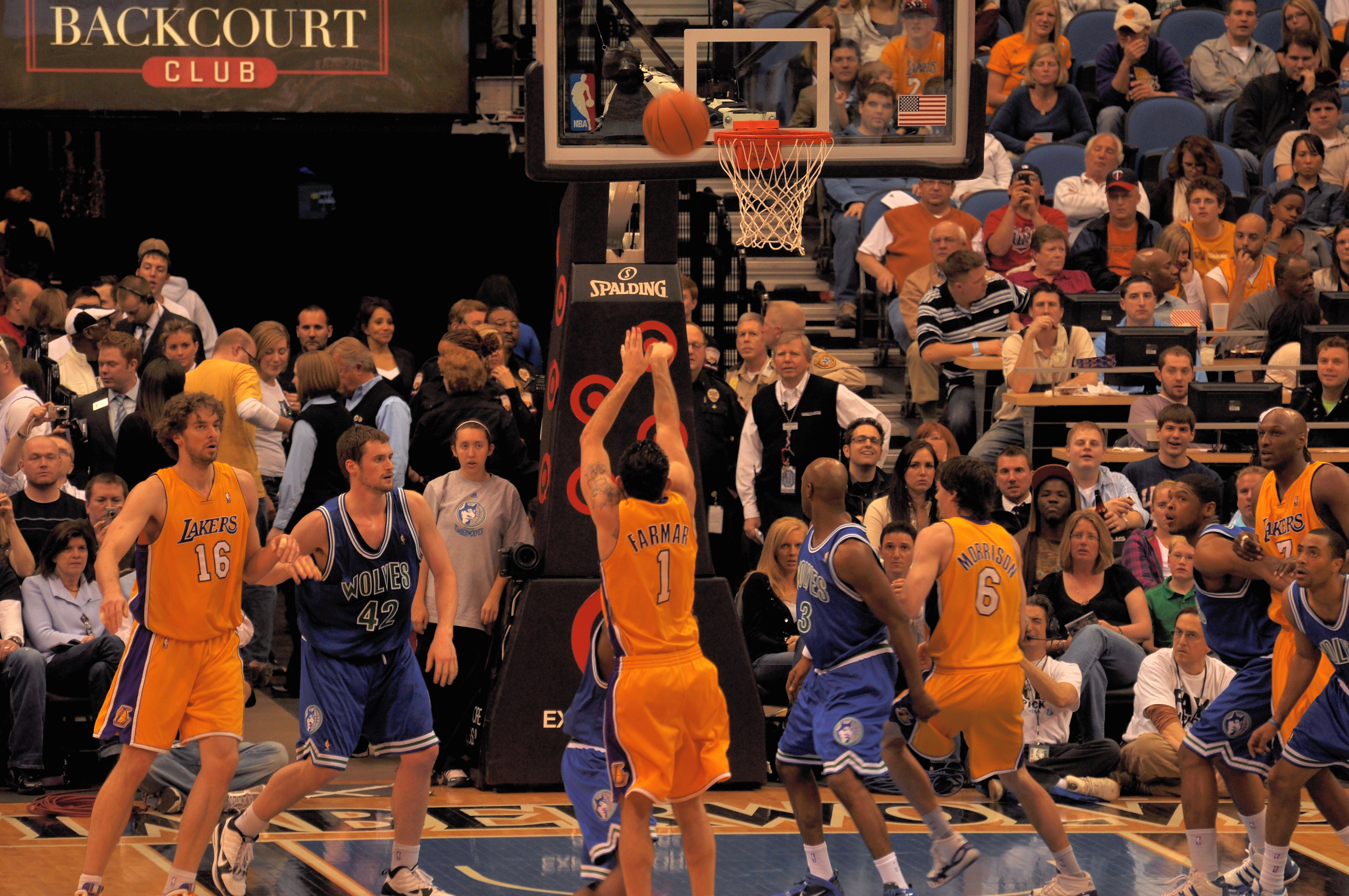
Minnesota Timberwolves vs. Los Angeles Lakers at the Target Center on April 9, 2010

=== Standings ===
Northwest Division	W	L	PCT	GB	Home	Road	Div
y-Denver Nuggets	53	29	.646	–	34–7	19–22	12–4
x-Utah Jazz	53	29	.646	–	32–9	21–20	8–8
x-Portland Trail Blazers	50	32	.610	3	26–15	24–17	8–8
x-Oklahoma City Thunder	50	32	.610	3	27–14	23–18	9–7
Minnesota Timberwolves	15	67	.183	38	10–31	5–36	3–13

#	Western Conference				
#	Team	W	L	PCT	GB
1	c-Los Angeles Lakers	57	25	.695	–
2	y-Dallas Mavericks	55	27	.671	2
3	x-Phoenix Suns	54	28	.659	3
4	y-Denver Nuggets	53	29	.646	4
5	x-Utah Jazz	53	29	.646	4
6	x-Portland Trail Blazers	50	32	.610	7
7	x-San Antonio Spurs	50	32	.610	7
8	x-Oklahoma City Thunder	50	32	.610	7
9	Houston Rockets	42	40	.512	15
10	Memphis Grizzlies	40	42	.488	17
11	New Orleans Hornets	37	45	.451	20
12	Los Angeles Clippers	29	53	.354	28
13	Golden State Warriors	26	56	.317	31
14	Sacramento Kings	25	57	.305	32
15	Minnesota Timberwolves	15	67	.183	42

== Player statistics ==
=== Regular season ===
Player	POS	GP	GS	MP	REB	AST	STL	BLK	PTS	MPG	RPG	APG	SPG	BPG	PPG
Corey Brewer	SG	82	82	2,482	279	193	117	29	1,066	30.3	3.4	2.4	1.4	.4	13.0
Ramon Sessions	PG	82	1	1,732	214	258	55	5	674	21.1	2.6	3.1	.7	.1	8.2
Jonny Flynn	PG	81	81	2,339	191	356	82	2	1,094	28.9	2.4	4.4	1.0	.0	13.5
Damien Wilkins	SF	80	31	1,585	249	135	66	25	451	19.8	3.1	1.7	.8	.3	5.6
Al Jefferson	C	76	76	2,463	703	137	63	98	1,301	32.4	9.3	1.8	.8	1.3	17.1
Ryan Gomes	SF	76	64	2,210	348	124	62	16	832	29.1	4.6	1.6	.8	.2	10.9
Wayne Ellington	SG	76	1	1,384	159	74	20	5	505	18.2	2.1	1.0	.3	.1	6.6
Ryan Hollins	C	73	27	1,223	207	51	19	38	447	16.8	2.8	.7	.3	.5	6.1
Aleksandar Pavlović	SF	71	0	877	117	58	23	6	263	12.4	1.6	.8	.3	.1	3.7
Kevin Love	PF	60	22	1,714	658	136	43	23	842	28.6	11.0	2.3	.7	.4	14.0
Oleksiy Pecherov	C	44	5	447	124	11	9	14	197	10.2	2.8	.3	.2	.3	4.5
Nathan Jawai	C	39	2	412	104	24	10	9	124	10.6	2.7	.6	.3	.2	3.2
Brian Cardinal	PF	29	0	267	29	24	9	3	48	9.2	1.0	.8	.3	.1	1.7
Darko Miličić^{†}	C	24	18	614	133	43	18	33	199	25.6	5.5	1.8	.8	1.4	8.3
Alando Tucker^{†}	SF	4	0	25	3	1	0	0	8	6.3	.8	.3	.0	.0	2.0
Jason Hart^{†}	PG	1	0	5	0	1	1	0	0	5.0	.0	1.0	1.0	.0	.0

- ^{†} Denotes player spent time with another team in the season. Stats reflect time with the Timberwolves only.
