= 2009–10 Golden State Warriors season =

NBA professional basketball team season

- Head coach: Don Nelson
- General manager: Larry Riley
- Owners: Oakland–Alameda County Coliseum Authority (City of Oakland and Alameda County)
- Arena: Oracle Arena

Results
- Record: 26–56 (.317)
- Place: Division: 4th (Pacific); Conference: 13th (Western)
- Playoff finish: Did not qualify
- Stats at Basketball Reference

Local media
- Television: Comcast SportsNet Bay Area
- Radio: KNBR

The 2009–10 Golden State Warriors season was the 64th season of the franchise in the National Basketball Association (NBA) and its 48th in the San Francisco Bay Area. This was also Stephen Curry's first season in the NBA & the Warriors. The Warriors missed the playoffs for the third consecutive season.

== Draft ==
Round	Pick	Player	Position	Nationality	School / club team
1	7	Stephen Curry	PG	United States	Davidson

== Roster ==
2009–10 Golden State Warriors roster
Players

Pos.	No.	Player	Height	Weight	DOB	From
G/F	7	Kelenna Azubuike (IN)	6 ft 5 in (1.96 m)	220 lb (100 kg)		Kentucky
F/C	15	Andris Biedriņš (IN)	6 ft 11 in (2.11 m)	245 lb (111 kg)		Latvia
G	30	Stephen Curry	6 ft 3 in (1.91 m)	185 lb (84 kg)		Davidson
G	8	Monta Ellis	6 ft 3 in (1.91 m)	180 lb (82 kg)		LHS (MS)
G/F	19	Devean George	6 ft 8 in (2.03 m)	235 lb (107 kg)		Augsburg
F/C	31	Chris Hunter	6 ft 11 in (2.11 m)	240 lb (109 kg)		Michigan
G/F	50	Corey Maggette	6 ft 6 in (1.98 m)	225 lb (102 kg)		Duke
G/F	22	Anthony Morrow	6 ft 5 in (1.96 m)	210 lb (95 kg)		Georgia Tech
F	77	Vladimir Radmanović	6 ft 10 in (2.08 m)	235 lb (107 kg)		Serbia
F	4	Anthony Randolph	6 ft 10 in (2.08 m)	210 lb (95 kg)		LSU
F/C	44	Anthony Tolliver	6 ft 9 in (2.06 m)	240 lb (109 kg)		Creighton
F/C	21	Ronny Turiaf	6 ft 10 in (2.08 m)	250 lb (113 kg)		Gonzaga
G	23	C. J. Watson	6 ft 2 in (1.88 m)	175 lb (79 kg)		Tennessee
G/F	55	Reggie Williams	6 ft 6 in (1.98 m)	210 lb (95 kg)		VMI
F/C	32	Brandan Wright (IN)	6 ft 10 in (2.08 m)	210 lb (95 kg)		North Carolina

Coaches
Head coach
- Don Nelson
Assistant(s)
- Larry Harris
- Keith Smart
- Stephen Silas
- Russell Turner

Legend
- (DP) Unsigned draft pick
- (FA) Free agent
- (S) Suspended
- Injured

== Pre-season ==
2009 pre-season game log
Total: 4–4 (Home: 2–0; Road: 2–4)
Pre-season: 4–4 (home: 2–0; road: 2–4)

Game	Date	Team	Score	High points	High rebounds	High assists	Location Attendance	Record
1	October 4	L.A. Clippers	W 108–101	Anthony Morrow (21)	Kelenna Azubuike (10)	Stephen Curry (9)	Oracle Arena; 11,204	1–0
2	October 7	@ L.A. Lakers	L 101–118	Anthony Morrow (25)	Anthony Randolph (12)	Stephen Jackson (5)	Honda Center; 13,156	1–1
3	October 9	@ L.A. Lakers	W 110–91	Monta Ellis (24)	Andris Biedriņš (12)	Ellis, Curry (8)	The Forum; 17,505	2–1
4	October 10	@ Phoenix	W 104–101	Anthony Morrow (30)	Andris Biedriņš (15)	Stephen Curry (7)	Indian Wells Tennis Garden; 14,979	3–1
5	October 12	@ L.A. Clippers	L 117–124	Anthony Morrow (32)	Andris Biedriņš (9)	Monta Ellis (7)	Staples Center; 10,238	3–2
6	October 17	@ Sacramento	L 94–101	Corey Maggette (28)	Andris Biedriņš (8)	3 players tied (4)	Sleep Train Arena; 11,009	3–3
7	October 20	@ L.A. Lakers	L 107–113	Anthony Morrow (24)	Ronny Turiaf (12)	Stephen Jackson (10)	Citizens Business Bank Arena; 10,410	3–4
8	October 22	New Orleans	W 126–92	Anthony Morrow (34)	Ronny Turiaf (11)	Stephen Curry (10)	Oracle Arena; 15,123	4–4

2009–10 season schedule

=== Standings ===
Pacific Division	W	L	PCT	GB	Home	Road	Div
c-Los Angeles Lakers	57	25	.695	–	34–7	23–18	13–3
x-Phoenix Suns	54	28	.659	3	32–9	22–19	12–4
Los Angeles Clippers	29	53	.354	28	21–20	8–33	5–11
Golden State Warriors	26	56	.317	31	18–23	8–33	5–11
Sacramento Kings	25	57	.305	32	18–23	7–34	5–11

#	Western Conference				
#	Team	W	L	PCT	GB
1	c-Los Angeles Lakers	57	25	.695	–
2	y-Dallas Mavericks	55	27	.671	2
3	x-Phoenix Suns	54	28	.659	3
4	y-Denver Nuggets	53	29	.646	4
5	x-Utah Jazz	53	29	.646	4
6	x-Portland Trail Blazers	50	32	.610	7
7	x-San Antonio Spurs	50	32	.610	7
8	x-Oklahoma City Thunder	50	32	.610	7
9	Houston Rockets	42	40	.512	15
10	Memphis Grizzlies	40	42	.488	17
11	New Orleans Hornets	37	45	.451	20
12	Los Angeles Clippers	29	53	.354	28
13	Golden State Warriors	26	56	.317	31
14	Sacramento Kings	25	57	.305	32
15	Minnesota Timberwolves	15	67	.183	42

== Regular season ==
=== Game log ===
2009–10 game log
Total: 26–56 (Home: 18–23; Road: 8–33)
October: 0–2 (home: 0–1; road: 0–1)

Game	Date	Team	Score	High points	High rebounds	High assists	Location Attendance	Record
1	October 28	Houston	L 107–108	Monta Ellis (26)	Corey Maggette (9)	Stephen Curry (7)	Oracle Arena; 19,596	0–1
2	October 30	@ Phoenix	L 101–123	Monta Ellis (19)	Andris Biedriņš (10)	Curry, Biedriņš (4)	US Airways Center; 18,422	0–2

November: 6–8 (home: 4–2; road: 2–6)

Game	Date	Team	Score	High points	High rebounds	High assists	Location Attendance	Record
3	November 4	Memphis	W 113–105	Ellis, Morrow (24)	Andris Biedriņš (8)	Monta Ellis (12)	Oracle Arena; 17,457	1–2
4	November 6	L.A. Clippers	L 90–118	Anthony Morrow (18)	Anthony Randolph (14)	Monta Ellis (6)	Oracle Arena; 18,788	1–3
5	November 8	@ Sacramento	L 107–120	Stephen Jackson (21)	Kelenna Azubuike (7)	Stephen Curry (6)	ARCO Arena; 10,760	1–4
6	November 9	Minnesota	W 146–105	Kelenna Azubuike (31)	Monta Ellis (10)	Stephen Jackson (15)	Oracle Arena; 15,468	2–4
7	November 11	@ Indiana	L 94–108	Corey Maggette (21)	Anthony Randolph (13)	Monta Ellis (5)	Conseco Fieldhouse; 10,682	2–5
8	November 13	@ New York	W 121–107	Stephen Jackson (23)	Stephen Jackson (8)	Kelenna Azubuike (5)	Madison Square Garden; 19,763	3–5
9	November 14	@ Milwaukee	L 125–129	Monta Ellis (26)	Anthony Randolph (6)	Stephen Jackson (5)	Bradley Center; 14,978	3–6
10	November 17	@ Cleveland	L 108–114	Monta Ellis (23)	Corey Maggette (11)	Monta Ellis (8)	Quicken Loans Arena; 20,562	3–7
11	November 18	@ Boston	L 95–109	Corey Maggette (23)	Maggette, Randolph (8)	Stephen Curry (7)	TD Garden; 18,624	3–8
12	November 20	Portland	W 108–94	Monta Ellis (34)	Anthony Randolph (11)	Curry, Ellis (8)	Oracle Arena; 18,630	4–8
13	November 24	@ Dallas	W 111–103	Monta Ellis (37)	Vladimir Radmanović (12)	Monta Ellis (8)	American Airlines Center; 20,008	5–8
14	November 25	@ San Antonio	L 104–118	Monta Ellis (42)	Curry, Randolph (7)	Stephen Curry (5)	AT&T Center; 17,606	5–9
15	November 28	L.A. Lakers	L 97–130	Monta Ellis (18)	Vladimir Radmanović (10)	Stephen Curry (8)	Oracle Arena; 20,001	5–10
16	November 30	Indiana	W 126–107	Monta Ellis (45)	3 players tied (6)	Watson, Maggette (6)	Oracle Arena; 16,574	6–10

December : 3–12 (home: 2–4; road: 1–8)

Game	Date	Team	Score	High points	High rebounds	High assists	Location Attendance	Record
17	December 1	@ Denver	L 107–135	Anthony Morrow (27)	Corey Maggette (7)	Stephen Curry (6)	Pepsi Center; 14,570	6–11
18	December 3	Houston	L 109–111	Monta Ellis (24)	Vladimir Radmanović (8)	Monta Ellis (8)	Oracle Arena; 16,432	6–12
19	December 5	Orlando	L 118–126	Monta Ellis (33)	Anthony Randolph (13)	Monta Ellis (7)	Oracle Arena; 19,054	6–13
20	December 7	@ Oklahoma City	L 88–104	Monta Ellis (31)	Vladimir Radmanović (8)	C. J. Watson (3)	Ford Center; 17,334	6–14
21	December 9	@ New Jersey	W 105–89	Ellis, Watson (18)	3 players tied (9)	Monta Ellis (8)	Izod Center; 10,005	7–14
22	December 11	@ Chicago	L 91–96 (OT)	Monta Ellis (27)	Corey Maggette (10)	Monta Ellis (5)	United Center; 18,803	7–15
23	December 12	@ Detroit	L 95–104	Monta Ellis (29)	Monta Ellis (7)	C. J. Watson (6)	The Palace of Auburn Hills; 16,952	7–16
24	December 14	@ Philadelphia	L 101–117	Corey Maggette (24)	Randolph, Radmanović (5)	Curry, Morrow (4)	Wachovia Center; 12,795	7–17
25	December 16	San Antonio	L 91–103	Monta Ellis (35)	C. J. Watson (7)	Ellis, Maggette (5)	Oracle Arena; 17,857	7–18
26	December 18	Washington	L 109–118	Monta Ellis (30)	Anthony Randolph (9)	Monta Ellis (7)	Oracle Arena; 17,423	7–19
27	December 22	@ Memphis	L 108–121	Corey Maggette (25)	Stephen Curry (7)	Stephen Curry (8)	FedExForum; 12,827	7–20
28	December 23	@ New Orleans	L 102–108	Monta Ellis (35)	Curry, Maggette (10)	Stephen Curry (7)	New Orleans Arena; 14,391	7–21
29	December 26	Phoenix	W 132–127	Ellis, Maggette (33)	Corey Maggette (8)	Monta Ellis (10)	Oracle Arena; 19,550	8–21
30	December 28	Boston	W 103–99	Monta Ellis (37)	Vladimir Radmanović (10)	C. J. Watson (7)	Oracle Arena; 19,259	9–21
31	December 29	@ L.A. Lakers	L 118–124	Corey Maggette (25)	Andris Biedriņš (8)	Monta Ellis (7)	Staples Center; 18,997	9–22

January : 4–11 (home: 3–6; road: 1–5)

Game	Date	Team	Score	High points	High rebounds	High assists	Location Attendance	Record
32	January 2	@ Portland	L 89–105	Monta Ellis (30)	Anthony Randolph (11)	Monta Ellis (4)	Rose Garden; 20,507	9–23
33	January 5	@ Denver	L 122–123	Corey Maggette (35)	Corey Maggette (7)	Curry, Ellis (6)	Pepsi Center; 15,129	9–24
34	January 6	@ Minnesota	W 107–101	Corey Maggette (28)	Corey Maggette (10)	Monta Ellis (6)	Target Center; 12,046	10–24
35	January 8	Sacramento	W 108–101	Monta Ellis (39)	Andris Biedriņš (9)	Monta Ellis (6)	Oracle Arena; 18,327	11–24
36	January 11	Cleveland	L 114–117	Corey Maggette (32)	Vladimir Radmanović (9)	Curry, Ellis (5)	Oracle Arena; 19,596	11–25
37	January 13	Miami	L 102–115	Corey Maggette (25)	Andris Biedriņš (8)	Monta Ellis (9)	Oracle Arena; 17,121	11–26
38	January 15	Milwaukee	L 104–113	Monta Ellis (33)	Andris Biedriņš (10)	Monta Ellis (8)	Oracle Arena; 17,455	11–27
39	January 18	Chicago	W 114–97	Monta Ellis (36)	Andris Biedriņš (19)	Monta Ellis (8)	Oracle Arena; 19,208	12–27
40	January 20	Denver	L 118–123 (OT)	Monta Ellis (39)	Andris Biedriņš (13)	Monta Ellis (10)	Oracle Arena; 17,223	12–28
41	January 22	New Jersey	W 111–79	Stephen Curry (32)	Tolliver, Biedriņš (10)	Stephen Curry (7)	Oracle Arena; 17,308	13–28
42	January 23	@ Phoenix	L 103–112	Corey Maggette (27)	Anthony Tolliver (11)	Corey Maggette (4)	US Airways Center; 17,792	13–29
43	January 26	@ Sacramento	L 96–99	Stephen Curry (27)	Corey Maggette (12)	Stephen Curry (6)	ARCO Arena; 14,522	13–30
44	January 27	New Orleans	L 110–123	C. J. Watson (23)	Monta Ellis (6)	Monta Ellis (9)	Oracle Arena; 16,308	13–31
45	January 29	Charlotte	L 110–121	Corey Maggette (25)	Andris Biedriņš (7)	Stephen Curry (9)	Oracle Arena; 17,850	13–32
46	January 31	@ Oklahoma City	L 104–112	Corey Maggette (26)	Ronny Turiaf (8)	Coby Karl (6)	Ford Center; 17,565	13–33

February : 4–8 (home: 4–5; road: 0–3)

Game	Date	Team	Score	High points	High rebounds	High assists	Location Attendance	Record
47	February 2	@ Houston	L 97–119	Monta Ellis (34)	Andris Biedriņš (8)	Coby Karl (7)	Toyota Center; 12,845	13–34
48	February 3	@ Dallas	L 101–110	Monta Ellis (46)	Maggette, Biedriņš (9)	Curry, Biedriņš (3)	American Airlines Center; 19,679	13–35
49	February 6	Oklahoma City	L 95–104	Corey Maggette (24)	Andris Biedriņš (18)	Monta Ellis (6)	Oracle Arena; 17,825	13–36
50	February 8	Dallas	L 117–127	Anthony Morrow (33)	Morrow, Tolliver (11)	Stephen Curry (9)	Oracle Arena; 17,015	13–37
51	February 10	L.A. Clippers	W 132–102	Stephen Curry (36)	Curry, Morrow (10)	Stephen Curry (13)	Oracle Arena; 17,230	14–37
52	February 16	@ L.A. Lakers	L 94–104	Anthony Morrow (23)	Stephen Curry (10)	Stephen Curry (8)	Staples Center; 18,997	14–38
53	February 17	Sacramento	W 130–98	C. J. Watson (40)	Anthony Tolliver (8)	Stephen Curry (15)	Oracle Arena; 17,023	15–38
54	February 19	Utah	L 89–100	C. J. Watson (22)	Chris Hunter, Biedriņš (9)	Stephen Curry (7)	Oracle Arena; 18,322	15–39
55	February 21	Atlanta	W 108–104	Stephen Curry (32)	Andris Biedriņš (13)	C. J. Watson (6)	Oracle Arena; 17,822	16–39
56	February 23	Philadelphia	L 102–110	Monta Ellis (22)	Chris Hunter (8)	Stephen Curry (5)	Oracle Arena; 17,115	16–40
57	February 25	Denver	L 112–127	Stephen Curry (30)	Devean George (9)	Stephen Curry (13)	Oracle Arena; 18,555	16–41
58	February 27	Detroit	W 95–88	Stephen Curry (27)	Anthony Tolliver (14)	3 players tied (5)	Oracle Arena; 17,223	17–41

March : 4–12 (home: 3–4; road: 1–8)

Game	Date	Team	Score	High points	High rebounds	High assists	Location Attendance	Record
59	March 2	@ Miami	L 106–110	Anthony Morrow (24)	Anthony Tolliver (8)	Stephen Curry (8)	American Airlines Arena; 15,213	17–42
60	March 3	@ Orlando	L 90–117	C. J. Watson (18)	Williams, George (6)	Stephen Curry (7)	Amway Arena; 17,461	17–43
61	March 5	@ Atlanta	L 122–127	Stephen Curry (31)	Ronny Turiaf (10)	Stephen Curry (11)	Philips Arena; 14,066	17–44
62	March 6	@ Charlotte	L 90–101	Stephen Curry (25)	Chris Hunter (13)	Anthony Tolliver (5)	Time Warner Cable Arena; 19,392	17–45
63	March 8	@ New Orleans	L 131–135	Morrow, Williams (28)	Anthony Tolliver (5)	C. J. Watson (7)	New Orleans Arena; 13,889	17–46
64	March 11	Portland	L 105–110	Corey Maggette (24)	Anthony Tolliver (11)	Maggette, C. J. Watson (6)	Oracle Arena; 17,308	17–47
65	March 13	Toronto	W 124–112	Stephen Curry (35)	Anthony Tolliver (11)	Stephen Curry (10)	Oracle Arena; 17,655	18–47
66	March 15	L.A. Lakers	L 121–124	Stephen Curry (29)	Chris Hunter (14)	Monta Ellis (11)	Oracle Arena; 20,038	18–48
67	March 17	New Orleans	W 131–121	Anthony Tolliver (30)	Chris Hunter (8)	Monta Ellis (13)	Oracle Arena; 17,155	19–48
68	March 19	@ San Antonio	L 116–147	Monta Ellis (39)	Reggie Williams (9)	C. J. Watson (7)	AT&T Center; 18,581	19–49
69	March 20	@ Memphis	L 107–123	Monta Ellis (28)	Anthony Tolliver (11)	Stephen Curry (6)	FedExForum; 14,897	19–50
70	March 22	Phoenix	L 131–133	Monta Ellis (30)	Anthony Tolliver (12)	Stephen Curry (8)	Oracle Arena; 18,722	19–51
71	March 24	Memphis	W 128–110	Stephen Curry (30)	Chris Hunter (10)	Stephen Curry (11)	Oracle Arena; 17,123	20–51
72	March 27	Dallas	L 90–111	Corey Maggette (21)	Anthony Tolliver (21)	Stephen Curry (6)	Oracle Arena; 19,104	20–52
73	March 28	@ L.A. Clippers	W 121–103	Reggie Williams (25)	Ronny Turiaf (8)	Curry, Williams (7)	Staples Center; 17,868	21–52
74	March 31	@ Utah	L 104–128	Corey Maggette (22)	Chris Hunter (8)	Stephen Curry (6)	EnergySolutions Arena; 19,617	21–53

April : 5–3 (home: 2–1; road: 3–2)

Game	Date	Team	Score	High points	High rebounds	High assists	Location Attendance	Record
75	April 2	New York	W 128–117	Anthony Morrow (35)	Anthony Tolliver (8)	Stephen Curry (10)	Oracle Arena; 19,230	22–53
76	April 4	@ Toronto	W 113–112	Corey Maggette (31)	Anthony Morrow (10)	Stephen Curry (12)	Air Canada Centre; 17,509	23–53
77	April 6	@ Washington	L 94–112	Stephen Curry (27)	Anthony Morrow (7)	Curry, Tolliver (4)	Verizon Center; 14,721	23–54
78	April 7	@ Minnesota	W 116–107	Anthony Tolliver (34)	Curry, Tolliver (8)	Stephen Curry (14)	Target Center; 15,863	24–54
79	April 10	@ L.A. Clippers	L 104–107	Stephen Curry (29)	Anthony Tolliver (10)	Maggette, Turiaf (5)	Staples Center; 17,476	24–55
80	April 11	Oklahoma City	W 120–117	Monta Ellis (27)	Anthony Tolliver (13)	Stephen Curry (7)	Oracle Arena; 18,940	25–55
81	April 13	Utah	L 94–103	Devean George (21)	Tolliver, Williams (9)	Curry, Ellis (6)	Oracle Arena; 19,230	25–56
82	April 14	@ Portland	W 122–116	Stephen Curry (42)	Anthony Tolliver (15)	Stephen Curry (8)	Rose Garden; 20,482	26–56

2009–10 season schedule

== Player statistics ==
Legend
GP	Games played	GS	Games started	MPG	Minutes per game
FG%	Field-goal percentage	3P%	3-point field-goal percentage	FT%	Free-throw percentage
RPG	Rebounds per game	APG	Assists per game	SPG	Steals per game
BPG	Blocks per game	PPG	Points per game

=== Regular season ===
Player	GP	GS	MPG	FG%	3P%	FT%	RPG	APG	SPG	BPG	PPG
Kelenna Azubuike	9	7	25.7	.545	.370	.679	4.6	1.1	.6	1.0	13.9
Raja Bell	1	0	23.0	.667	1.000	.	2.0	3.0	.0	.0	11.0
Andris Biedrins	33	29	23.1	.591	.	.160	7.8	1.7	.6	1.3	5.0
Stephen Curry	80	77	36.2	.462	.437	.885	4.5	5.9	1.9	.2	17.5
Monta Ellis	64	64	41.4	.449	.338	.753	4.0	5.3	2.2	.4	25.5
Devean George	45	4	16.9	.432	.390	.696	2.5	.7	.9	.2	5.4
Chris Hunter	60	9	13.1	.502	.000	.754	2.8	.6	.2	.6	4.5
Stephen Jackson	9	9	33.3	.421	.275	.703	3.9	4.7	1.6	.7	16.6
Coby Karl	4	1	27.0	.344	.182	.667	4.0	3.8	.8	.3	7.0
Acie Law	5	0	13.2	.643	.333	.800	.4	1.4	1.2	.0	6.2
Corey Maggette	70	49	29.7	.516	.260	.835	5.3	2.5	.7	.1	19.8
Cartier Martin	10	2	27.6	.364	.323	.762	4.7	.9	.8	.0	9.0
Mikki Moore	23	20	17.7	.600	.	.636	3.0	1.6	.2	.6	5.0
Anthony Morrow	69	37	29.2	.468	.456	.886	3.8	1.5	.9	.2	13.0
Vladimir Radmanovic	33	20	23.0	.385	.267	.762	4.5	1.2	.8	.2	6.6
Anthony Randolph	33	8	22.7	.443	.200	.801	6.5	1.3	.8	1.5	11.6
Anthony Tolliver	44	29	32.3	.431	.331	.769	7.3	2.0	.7	.8	12.3
Ronny Turiaf	42	20	20.8	.582	.000	.474	4.5	2.1	.5	1.3	4.9
C. J. Watson	65	15	27.5	.468	.310	.771	2.6	2.8	1.6	.1	10.3
Reggie Williams	24	10	32.6	.495	.359	.839	4.6	2.8	1.0	.3	15.2

== Transactions ==
=== Trades ===
June 25, 2009	To Golden State Warriors • (United States) Acie Law • (United States) Speedy Claxton	To Atlanta Hawks • (United States) Jamal Crawford
July 30, 2009	To Golden State Warriors • (United States) Devean George • Cash considerations	To Toronto Raptors • (Italy) Marco Belinelli

=== Free agency ===
==== Re-signed ====
Player	Signed
(United States) C. J. Watson	1-year contract worth $1 million

==== Additions ====
Player	Signed	Former team
(United States) Mikki Moore	1-year contract worth $1.3 million	Boston Celtics
(United States) Anthony Tolliver		Portland Trail Blazers
(United States) Chris Hunter		Fort Wayne Mad Ants (NBA D-League)
(United States) Coby Karl	10-day contract	Idaho Stampede (NBA D-League)
(United States) Reggie Williams		Sioux Falls Skyforce (NBA D-League)

==== Subtractions ====
Player	Reason left	New team
(United States) Raja Bell	Waived	Utah Jazz

== Awards ==
Recipient	Award	Month
Stephen Curry	Western Conference Rookie of the Month	January
Stephen Curry	Western Conference Rookie of the Month	March
Stephen Curry	Western Conference Rookie of the Month	April
