= 2009–10 Memphis Grizzlies season =

- Head coach: Lionel Hollins
- General manager: Chris Wallace
- Owners: Michael Heisley
- Arena: FedEx Forum

Results
- Record: 40–42 (.488)
- Place: Division: 4th (Southwest); Conference: 10th (Western)
- Playoff finish: Did not qualify
- Stats at Basketball Reference

Local media
- Television: Fox Sports South, SportSouth
- Radio: WRBO

The 2009-10 Memphis Grizzlies season was the 15th season of the franchise in the National Basketball Association (NBA). The Grizzlies missed the playoffs for the fourth straight year.

During the offseason the Grizzlies acquired Allen Iverson, but his stint in Memphis lasted only three games and he left the team for personal reasons. Iverson then returned to the team where he began his career, the Philadelphia 76ers, in December.

== Key dates ==
- June 25 - The 2009 NBA draft took place in New York City.
- July 8 - The free agency period started.

== Draft picks ==
Round	Pick	Player	Position	Nationality	School
1	2	Hasheem Thabeet		Tanzania	Connecticut
1	27	DeMarre Carroll		United States	Missouri
2	36	Sam Young		United States	Pittsburgh

== Roster ==
2009–10 Memphis Grizzlies roster
Players

Pos.	No.	Player	Height	Weight	DOB	From
F	00	Darrell Arthur	6 ft 9 in (2.06 m)	235 lb (107 kg)		Kansas
G	9	Ronnie Brewer	6 ft 7 in (2.01 m)	227 lb (103 kg)		Arkansas
F	1	DeMarre Carroll	6 ft 8 in (2.03 m)	212 lb (96 kg)		Missouri
G	11	Mike Conley Jr.	6 ft 1 in (1.85 m)	185 lb (84 kg)		Ohio State
C	33	Marc Gasol (IN)	7 ft 1 in (2.16 m)	265 lb (120 kg)		Spain
F	22	Rudy Gay	6 ft 8 in (2.03 m)	230 lb (104 kg)		Connecticut
C	15	Hamed Haddadi	7 ft 2 in (2.18 m)	265 lb (120 kg)		Iran
G	25	Lester Hudson (IN)	6 ft 3 in (1.91 m)	190 lb (86 kg)		UT Martin
C	45	Steven Hunter (IN)	7 ft 0 in (2.13 m)	240 lb (109 kg)		DePaul
G	32	O. J. Mayo	6 ft 4 in (1.93 m)	210 lb (95 kg)		USC
F	50	Zach Randolph	6 ft 9 in (2.06 m)	260 lb (118 kg)		Michigan State
C	34	Hasheem Thabeet	7 ft 3 in (2.21 m)	263 lb (119 kg)		Connecticut
G	10	Jamaal Tinsley	6 ft 3 in (1.91 m)	185 lb (84 kg)		Iowa State
G	5	Marcus Williams	6 ft 3 in (1.91 m)	205 lb (93 kg)		Connecticut
G/F	4	Sam Young	6 ft 6 in (1.98 m)	220 lb (100 kg)		Pittsburgh

Coaches
Head coach
- Lionel Hollins
Assistant(s)
- Johnny Davis
- Henry Bibby
- Dave Joerger
- Barry Hecker
- Damon Stoudamire

Legend
- (DP) Unsigned draft pick
- (FA) Free agent
- (S) Suspended
- Injured

== Regular season ==
=== Standings ===
Southwest Division	W	L	PCT	GB	Home	Road	Div
y-Dallas Mavericks	55	27	.671	–	28–13	27–14	10–6
x-San Antonio Spurs	50	32	.610	5	29–12	21–20	9–7
Houston Rockets	42	40	.512	13	23–18	19–22	9–7
Memphis Grizzlies	40	42	.488	15	23–18	17–24	5–11
New Orleans Hornets	37	45	.451	18	24–17	13–28	7–9

#	Western Conference				
#	Team	W	L	PCT	GB
1	c-Los Angeles Lakers	57	25	.695	–
2	y-Dallas Mavericks	55	27	.671	2
3	x-Phoenix Suns	54	28	.659	3
4	y-Denver Nuggets	53	29	.646	4
5	x-Utah Jazz	53	29	.646	4
6	x-Portland Trail Blazers	50	32	.610	7
7	x-San Antonio Spurs	50	32	.610	7
8	x-Oklahoma City Thunder	50	32	.610	7
9	Houston Rockets	42	40	.512	15
10	Memphis Grizzlies	40	42	.488	17
11	New Orleans Hornets	37	45	.451	20
12	Los Angeles Clippers	29	53	.354	28
13	Golden State Warriors	26	56	.317	31
14	Sacramento Kings	25	57	.305	32
15	Minnesota Timberwolves	15	67	.183	42

== Player statistics ==
=== Ragular season ===
Player	POS	GP	GS	MP	REB	AST	STL	BLK	PTS	MPG	RPG	APG	SPG	BPG	PPG
O. J. Mayo	SG	82	82	3,113	311	242	98	17	1,432	38.0	3.8	3.0	1.2	.2	17.5
Zach Randolph	PF	81	81	3,051	950	149	80	34	1,681	37.7	11.7	1.8	1.0	.4	20.8
Rudy Gay	SF	80	80	3,175	472	153	118	64	1,567	39.7	5.9	1.9	1.5	.8	19.6
Mike Conley Jr.	PG	80	80	2,569	191	425	109	12	959	32.1	2.4	5.3	1.4	.2	12.0
Sam Young	SF	80	1	1,321	201	52	34	20	595	16.5	2.5	.7	.4	.3	7.4
DeMarre Carroll	SF	71	1	795	150	33	28	9	209	11.2	2.1	.5	.4	.1	2.9
Marc Gasol	C	69	69	2,469	640	165	69	109	1,008	35.8	9.3	2.4	1.0	1.6	14.6
Hasheem Thabeet	C	68	13	883	243	11	15	89	208	13.0	3.6	.2	.2	1.3	3.1
Marcus Williams	PG	62	1	872	93	161	32	1	269	14.1	1.5	2.6	.5	.0	4.3
Jamaal Tinsley	PG	38	1	589	66	108	33	5	133	15.5	1.7	2.8	.9	.1	3.5
Hamed Haddadi	C	36	0	240	75	10	1	14	62	6.7	2.1	.3	.0	.4	1.7
Darrell Arthur	PF	32	1	457	110	15	14	14	143	14.3	3.4	.5	.4	.4	4.5
Steven Hunter	C	21	0	158	42	0	1	10	53	7.5	2.0	.0	.0	.5	2.5
Lester Hudson^{†}	PG	9	0	61	10	5	5	1	36	6.8	1.1	.6	.6	.1	4.0
Ronnie Brewer^{†}	SG	5	0	80	7	3	6	0	10	16.0	1.4	.6	1.2	.0	2.0
Allen Iverson^{†}	PG	3	0	67	4	11	1	0	37	22.3	1.3	3.7	.3	.0	12.3
Trey Gilder	SF	2	0	5	1	0	1	0	2	2.5	.5	.0	.5	.0	1.0

- ^{†} Denotes player spent time with another team in the season. Stats reflect time with the Grizzlies only.

== Awards, records and milestones ==
=== Awards ===
==== Week/Month ====
Lionel Hollins - Western Conference Coach of the Month: December

==== All-Star ====
Zach Randolph was selected as a Western All-star reserve. (1st appearance)
