= 2009–10 New Orleans Hornets season =

- Head coach: Byron Scott (fired); Jeff Bower
- General manager: Jeff Bower
- Owner: George Shinn
- Arena: New Orleans Arena

Results
- Record: 37–45 (.451)
- Place: Division: 5th (Southwest); Conference: 11th (Western)
- Playoff finish: Did not qualify
- Stats at Basketball Reference

Local media
- Television: Cox Sports Television
- Radio: KMEZ

The 2009–10 New Orleans Hornets season was the team's eighth (Note: At the time, this season was considered the 22nd season in franchise history, being viewed as a relocation from Charlotte. In 2014, after this team was rebranded as the Pelicans, the name and the statistical history of the original team was reclaimed by the present day Charlotte Hornets, who had begun play in 2004 as an expansion team known as the Charlotte Bobcats.) season of the franchise in the National Basketball Association (NBA).

== Key dates ==
- June 25 – The 2009 NBA draft took place in New York City.
- July 8 – The free agency period started.
- November 12 – After a 3–6 start, the Hornets become the first NBA team this season to fire its head coach, dismissing Byron Scott. General manager Jeff Bower is named new head coach. In addition, former head coach Tim Floyd was brought in as an assistant coach.
- January 28 – Hornets point guard Chris Paul was selected as all-star reserve.

== Draft picks ==
Round	Pick	Player	Position	Nationality	College/Team
1	21	Darren Collison	PG	United States	UCLA

The Hornets entered the draft with one first-round selection. They have previously traded their second-round pick to the Toronto Raptors, who in turn traded it to the San Antonio Spurs.

== Roster ==
2009–10 New Orleans Hornets roster
Players

Pos.	No.	Player	Height	Weight	DOB	From
PG	2	Darren Collison	6 ft 0 in (1.83 m)	160 lb (73 kg)	1987-08-23	UCLA
C	34	Aaron Gray	7 ft 0 in (2.13 m)	270 lb (122 kg)	1984-12-07	Pittsburgh
C	4	Sean Marks	6 ft 10 in (2.08 m)	250 lb (113 kg)	1975-08-23	California
C	50	Emeka Okafor	6 ft 10 in (2.08 m)	255 lb (116 kg)	1982-09-28	Connecticut
PG	3	Chris Paul	6 ft 0 in (1.83 m)	175 lb (79 kg)	1985-05-06	Wake Forest
SG	24	Morris Peterson	6 ft 7 in (2.01 m)	220 lb (100 kg)	1977-08-26	Michigan State
SF	41	James Posey	6 ft 8 in (2.03 m)	217 lb (98 kg)	1977-01-13	Xavier
C	9	Darius Songaila	6 ft 9 in (2.06 m)	248 lb (112 kg)	1978-02-14	Wake Forest
SF	16	Peja Stojaković	6 ft 10 in (2.08 m)	229 lb (104 kg)	1977-06-09	Serbia
SG	5	Marcus Thornton	6 ft 4 in (1.93 m)	205 lb (93 kg)	1987-06-05	LSU
PF	30	David West	6 ft 9 in (2.06 m)	240 lb (109 kg)	1980-08-29	Xavier
SF	32	Julian Wright	6 ft 8 in (2.03 m)	225 lb (102 kg)	1987-05-20	Kansas

Coaches
Head coach
- Byron Scott (fired)
- Jeff Bower
Assistant(s)
- Tim Floyd
- Robert Pack
- Charlie Parker
- Paul Pressey
- Robert Werdann
- Terry Kofler (trainer)

Legend
- (DP) Unsigned draft pick
- (FA) Free agent
- (S) Suspended
- (DL) On assignment to D-League affiliate
- Injured

Roster
Updated: February 5, 2010

== Pre-season ==
2009 Pre-season game log: 2–0–2 (Home: 0–0–0; Road: 2–0–2)
#	Date	Visitor	Score	Home	OT	Decision	Attendance	Record	Recap
1	October 7 (in Atlanta)	New Orleans Hornets	102–108	Atlanta Hawks	–	Lost	8,024	0 – 1	1
2	October 8 (in Greensboro, North Carolina)	New Orleans Hornets	101–108	Charlotte Bobcats	-	Lost	8,623	0 – 2	2

== Regular season ==
=== Standings ===
Southwest Division	W	L	PCT	GB	Home	Road	Div
y-Dallas Mavericks	55	27	.671	–	28–13	27–14	10–6
x-San Antonio Spurs	50	32	.610	5	29–12	21–20	9–7
Houston Rockets	42	40	.512	13	23–18	19–22	9–7
Memphis Grizzlies	40	42	.488	15	23–18	17–24	5–11
New Orleans Hornets	37	45	.451	18	24–17	13–28	7–9

#	Western Conference				
#	Team	W	L	PCT	GB
1	c-Los Angeles Lakers	57	25	.695	–
2	y-Dallas Mavericks	55	27	.671	2
3	x-Phoenix Suns	54	28	.659	3
4	y-Denver Nuggets	53	29	.646	4
5	x-Utah Jazz	53	29	.646	4
6	x-Portland Trail Blazers	50	32	.610	7
7	x-San Antonio Spurs	50	32	.610	7
8	x-Oklahoma City Thunder	50	32	.610	7
9	Houston Rockets	42	40	.512	15
10	Memphis Grizzlies	40	42	.488	17
11	New Orleans Hornets	37	45	.451	20
12	Los Angeles Clippers	29	53	.354	28
13	Golden State Warriors	26	56	.317	31
14	Sacramento Kings	25	57	.305	32
15	Minnesota Timberwolves	15	67	.183	42

=== Game log ===
2009–10 game log
Total: 37–45 (Home: 24–17; Road: 13–28)
October: 1–1 (home: 1–0; road: 0–1)

Game	Date	Team	Score	High points	High rebounds	High assists	Location Attendance	Record
1	October 28	@ San Antonio	L 96–113	Chris Paul (26)	Emeka Okafor (10)	Chris Paul (9)	AT&T Center; 18,581	0–1
2	October 30	Sacramento	W 97–92	Chris Paul (31)	Emeka Okafor (13)	Chris Paul (4)	New Orleans Arena; 17,306	1–1

November: 6–9 (home: 5–2; road: 1–7)

Game	Date	Team	Score	High points	High rebounds	High assists	Location Attendance	Record
3	November 1	@ Boston	L 87–97	Peja Stojakovic (26)	Emeka Okafor (10)	Chris Paul (8)	TD Garden; 18,624	1–2
4	November 2	@ New York	L 111–117	Chris Paul (32)	Emeka Okafor (10)	Chris Paul (13)	Madison Square Garden; 19,763	1–3
5	November 4	Dallas	W 114–107 (OT)	Chris Paul (39)	Emeka Okafor (13)	Chris Paul (7)	New Orleans Arena; 13,566	2–3
6	November 6	Toronto	L 90–107	Chris Paul (21)	Emeka Okafor (8)	Chris Paul (18)	New Orleans Arena; 15,010	2–4
7	November 8	@ L. A. Lakers	L 88–104	Chris Paul (15)	Emeka Okafor (14)	Chris Paul (9)	STAPLES Center; 18,997	2–5
8	November 9	@ L. A. Clippers	W 112–84	Devin Brown (25)	David West (9)	Chris Paul (10)	STAPLES Center; 14,760	3–5
9	November 11	@ Phoenix	L 104–124	Chris Paul (25)	Devin Brown (5)	Chris Paul (6)	US Airways Center; 16,517	3–6
10	November 13	Portland	L 78–86	Marcus Thornton (20)	David West (10)	Chris Paul (8)	New Orleans Arena; 14,742	3–7
11	November 14	@ Atlanta	L 98–121	Peja Stojakovic (25)	David West, Emeka Okafor (12)	Bobby Brown (7)	Philips Arena; 18,572	3–8
12	November 17	L. A. Clippers	W 110–102	David West (24)	Emeka Okafor (14)	Darren Collison (6)	New Orleans Arena; 13,116	4–8
13	November 19	Phoenix	W 110–103	Peja Stojakovic (25)	Peja Stojakovic (13)	Devin Brown, Darren Collison, David West (5)	New Orleans Arena; 14,520	5–8
14	November 21	Atlanta	W 96–88	Darren Collison (22)	David West, Emeka Okafor (10)	Darren Collison (11)	New Orleans Arena; 15,933	6–8
15	November 22	@ Miami	L 101–102	Marcus Thornton (24)	David West (9)	Bobby Brown (7)	AmericanAirlines Arena; 16,500	6–9
16	November 25	Milwaukee	W 102–99 (OT)	David West (27)	Emeka Okafor (13)	Darren Collison (8)	New Orleans Arena; 14,315	7–9
17	November 29	@ Sacramento	L 96–112	David West (24)	Emeka Okafor (11)	Darren Collison (6)	Power Balance Pavilion; 11,548	7–10

December: 7–6 (home: 6–1; road: 1–5)

Game	Date	Team	Score	High points	High rebounds	High assists	Location Attendance	Record
18	December 1	@ L. A. Lakers	L 99–110	Darren Collison (20)	Emeka Okafor (12)	Devin Brown (8)	STAPLES Center; 18,997	7–11
19	December 4	Minnesota	W 98–89	Devin Brown (19)	Emeka Okafor (13)	Chris Paul (15)	New Orleans Arena; 14,720	8–11
20	December 8	Sacramento	W 96–94	David West (24)	David West, Emeka Okafor (12)	Chris Paul (12)	New Orleans Arena; 13,140	9–11
21	December 9	@ Minnesota	W 97–96	Peja Stojakovic (21)	David West, Emeka Okafor (6)	Chris Paul (14)	Target Center; 12,056	10–11
22	December 11	New York	L 96–113	David West (20)	David West (7)	Chris Paul (13)	New Orleans Arena; 15,569	10–12
23	December 14	@ Dallas	L 90–94	Chris Paul (20)	James Posey, Emeka Okafor (5)	Chris Paul (16)	American Airlines Center; 19,737	10–13
24	December 16	Detroit	W 95–87	David West (32)	David West (12)	Chris Paul (12)	New Orleans Arena; 13,196	11–13
25	December 18	Denver	W 98–92	Chris Paul (30)	Emeka Okafor (12)	Chris Paul (19)	New Orleans Arena; 14,453	12–13
26	December 20	@ Toronto	L 92–98	David West (21)	David West (12)	Chris Paul (7)	Air Canada Centre; 15,790	12–14
27	December 23	Golden State	W 108–102	David West (21)	David West (12)	Chris Paul (7)	New Orleans Arena; 14,391	13–14
28	December 26	@ Chicago	L 85–96	Devin Brown (22)	Emeka Okafor (9)	Chris Paul (7)	United Center; 22,008	13–15
29	December 29	@ Houston	L 100–108	David West (44)	David West (12)	Chris Paul (10)	Toyota Center; 18,187	13–16
30	December 30	Miami	W 95–91	David West (21)	Emeka Okafor (14)	Chris Paul (9)	New Orleans Arena; 17,301	14-16

January: 12–5 (home: 4–2; road: 8–3)

Game	Date	Team	Score	High points	High rebounds	High assists	Location Attendance	Record
31	January 2	Houston	W 99–95	Chris Paul (28)	Emeka Okafor (16)	Chris Paul (9)	New Orleans Arena; 16,020	15–16
32	January 4	@ Utah	W 91–87	Devin Brown (30)	David West (9)	Chris Paul (9)	EnergySolutions Arena; 19,911	16-16
33	January 6	@ Oklahoma City	W 97–92	David West (19)	David West, Emeka Okafor (8)	Chris Paul (13)	Oklahoma City Arena; 17,836	17–16
34	January 8	New Jersey	W 103–99	David West (32)	Emeka Okafor (13)	Chris Paul (18)	New Orleans Arena; 15,555	18–16
35	January 10	@ Washington	W 115–110	Chris Paul (26)	Emeka Okafor (7)	Chris Paul (14)	Verizon Center; 14,753	19–16
36	January 11	@ Philadelphia	L 92–96	Emeka Okafor (20)	David West (13)	Chris Paul (14)	Wachovia Center; 11,518	19–17
37	January 13	L. A. Clippers	W 108–94	Emeka Okafor (21)	David West (8)	Chris Paul (15)	New Orleans Arena; 14,348	20–17
38	January 15	@ Detroit	L 104–110 (OT)	David West (25)	David West (9)	Chris Paul (14)	The Palace of Auburn Hills; 17,446	20–18
39	January 16	@ Indiana	W 101–96	David West (24)	Emeka Okafor (12)	Chris Paul (11)	Conseco Fieldhouse; 13,376	21–18
40	January 18	San Antonio	L 90–97	Chris Paul, David West (18)	James Posey (10)	Chris Paul (9)	New Orleans Arena; 16,549	21–19
41	January 20	Memphis	W 113–111	Chris Paul, David West (21)	David West (13)	Chris Paul (13)	New Orleans Arena; 14,238	22–19
42	January 22	@ Minnesota	W 96–94	Chris Paul (23)	Emeka Okafor (10)	Chris Paul (9)	Target Center; 17,101	23–19
43	January 23	@ Denver	L 110–116 (OT)	Chris Paul (26)	Emeka Okafor (10)	Chris Paul (10)	Pepsi Center; 19,807	23–20
44	January 25	@ Portland	W 98–97	Chris Paul (24)	Emeka Okafor (9)	Chris Paul (12)	Rose Garden Arena; 20,249	24–20
45	January 27	@ Golden State	W 123–110	Chris Paul (38)	David West, Emeka Okafor (12)	Chris Paul (9)	Oracle Arena; 16,308	25–20
46	January 29	Chicago	L 106–108 (OT)	David West (29)	David West (14)	Chris Paul (12)	New Orleans Arena; 16,578	25–21
47	January 30	@ Memphis	W 109–102 (OT)	David West (22)	Emeka Okafor (10)	Darren Collison (18)	FedEx Forum; 12,317	26–21

February: 5–8 (home: 4–4; road: 1–4)

Game	Date	Team	Score	High points	High rebounds	High assists	Location Attendance	Record
48	February 1	Phoenix	L 100–109	Marcus Thornton (25)	David West, James Posey (8)	Darren Collison (14)	New Orleans Arena; 13,874	26–22
49	February 3	Oklahoma City	L 99–103	Marcus Thornton (22)	Emeka Okafor (12)	Darren Collison (9)	New Orleans Arena; 12,884	26–23
50	February 5	Philadelphia	L 94–101	Peja Stojakovic (23)	James Posey (10)	James Posey (6)	New Orleans Arena; 15,162	26–24
51	February 6	@ Charlotte	W 104–99	Darren Collison (24)	James Posey (8)	Darren Collison, David West, Morris Peterson (4)	Time Warner Cable Arena; 19,164	27–24
52	February 8	@ Orlando	L 117–123	Peja Stojakovic (29)	Peja Stojakovic (9)	Darren Collison (9)	Amway Arena; 17,461	27–25
53	February 10	Boston	W 93–85	Darren Collison (25)	Morris Peterson (10)	Darren Collison (9)	New Orleans Arena; 14,848	28–25
All-Star Break
54	February 17	Utah	L 90–98	Darren Collison, Peja Stojakovic (24)	Emeka Okafor (10)	Darren Collison (9)	New Orleans Arena; 13,561	28–26
55	February 19	Indiana	W 107–101	David West (29)	Darren Collison, Emeka Okafor (13)	Darren Collison (12)	New Orleans Arena; 15,644	29–26
56	February 21	Houston	W 102–94	David West (27)	Emeka Okafor (11)	Darren Collison (9)	New Orleans Arena; 14,504	30–26
57	February 23	@ Cleveland	L 95–105	Marcus Thornton (37)	James Posey (9)	Darren Collison (10)	Quicken Loans Arena; 20,562	30–27
58	February 24	@ Milwaukee	L 95–115	Marcus Thornton (25)	David West (9)	Darren Collison (9)	Bradley Center; 11,936	30–28
59	February 26	Orlando	W 100–93	David West (40)	David West (10)	Darren Collison (7)	Bradley Center; 16,954	31–28
60	February 28	@ Dallas	L 100–108	Darren Collison (35)	Emeka Okafor (17)	David West (6)	American Airlines Center; 19,911	31–29

March: 4–12 (home: 3–6; road: 1–6)

Game	Date	Team	Score	High points	High rebounds	High assists	Location Attendance	Record
61	March 1	San Antonio	L 92–106	Marcus Thornton (30)	David West (9)	Darren Collison (15)	New Orleans Arena; 13,655	31–30
62	March 3	Memphis	L 100–104	Marcus Thornton (24)	Peja Stojakovic (9)	Darren Collison (14)	New Orleans Arena; 14,347	31-31
63	March 5	@ San Antonio	L 91–102	Darren Collison (32)	David West (9)	David West (7)	AT&T Center; 18,581	31–32
64	March 8	Golden State	W 135–131	David West, Marcus Thornton (28)	David West (13)	Darren Collison (20)	New Orleans Arena; 13,889	32-32
65	March 10	@ Oklahoma City	L 83–98	David West (33)	Aaron Gray (7)	Darren Collison (9)	Oklahoma City Arena; 18,203	32–33
66	March 12	Denver	L 95–102	David West (30)	Emeka Okafor (9)	Darren Collison (10)	New Orleans Arena; 17,220	32–34
67	March 14	@ Phoenix	L 106–120	Marcus Thornton (28)	Emeka Okafor (12)	Darren Collison (10)	US Airways Center; 18,218	32–35
68	March 15	@ L. A. Clippers	W 108–100	David West (24)	Emeka Okafor (14)	Darren Collison (14)	STAPLES Center; 15,617	33–35
69	March 17	@ Golden State	L 121–131	David West (36)	David West (15)	Darren Collison (14)	Oracle Arena; 17,155	33–36
70	March 18	@ Denver	L 80–93	Darren Collison, Marcus Thornton (15)	Emeka Okafor (10)	Darren Collison (6)	Pepsi Center; 19,155	33–37
71	March 20	@ Utah	L 86–106	Marcus Thornton (22)	Aaron Gray (11)	Darren Collison (6)	EnergySolutions Arena; 18,766	33–38
72	March 22	Dallas	W 115–99	Marcus Thornton (28)	David West, Emeka Okafor (6)	David West (10)	New Orleans Arena; 14,047	34–38
73	March 24	Cleveland	L 92–105	Marcus Thornton (20)	Emeka Okafor (10)	Chris Paul‚ Darren Collison (7)	New Orleans Arena; 18,008	34–39
74	March 27	Portland	L 101–112	Darren Collison (22)	Aaron Gray (6)	Chris Paul (10)	New Orleans Arena; 16,475	34–40
75	March 29	L. A. Lakers	W 108–100	David West (20)	Emeka Okafor (13)	Chris Paul (13)	New Orleans Arena; 18,206	35–40
76	March 31	Washington	L 91–96	David West (18)	Aaron Gray (7)	Chris Paul (9)	New Orleans Arena; 14,634	35–41

April: 2–4 (home: 1–2; road: 1–2)

Game	Date	Team	Score	High points	High rebounds	High assists	Location Attendance	Record
77	April 2	@ Memphis	L 96–107	Marcus Thornton (19)	David West (9)	Chris Paul (8)	FedEx Forum; 15,043	35–42
78	April 3	@ New Jersey	L 87–115	David West (25)	Marcus Thornton (8)	David West, Chris Paul (6)	Izod Center; 14,698	35–43
79	April 7	Charlotte	L 103–104	Marcus Thornton (36)	Emeka Okafor (9)	Darren Collison (9)	New Orleans Arena; 13,333	35–44
80	April 9	Utah	L 103–114	Darren Collison (28)	Emeka Okafor (8)	Darren Collison, Marcus Thornton (7)	New Orleans Arena; 16,624	35–45
81	April 11	Minnesota	W 114–86	Emeka Okafor (23)	David West (12)	Darren Collison (11)	New Orleans Arena; 14,931	36–45
82	April 14	@ Houston	W 123–115	David West (35)	David West (10)	Darren Collison (11)	Toyota Center; 18,191	37–45

2009–10 season schedule

== Player statistics ==
Legend
GP	Games played	GS	Games started	MPG	Minutes per game
FG%	Field-goal percentage	3P%	3-point field-goal percentage	FT%	Free-throw percentage
RPG	Rebounds per game	APG	Assists per game	SPG	Steals per game
BPG	Blocks per game	PPG	Points per game

=== Regular season ===
Player	GP	GS	MPG	FG%	3P%	FT%	RPG	APG	SPG	BPG	PPG
Hilton Armstrong	18	0	13.3	.380	.	.464	3.4	.9	.4	.4	2.8
Bobby Brown	22	0	14.9	.395	.258	1.000	.8	2.1	.4	.0	6.6
Devin Brown	39	37	24.8	.393	.367	.802	2.8	1.5	.8	.1	9.7
Darren Collison	76	37	27.8	.477	.400	.851	2.5	5.7	1.0	.1	12.4
Aaron Gray	24	0	10.9	.557	.	.857	3.8	.8	.4	.5	3.6
Jason Hart	4	0	4.3	1.000	.	.	.5	1.3	.3	.3	.5
Sean Marks	14	0	5.4	.500	.	.400	1.6	.1	.0	.2	.7
Emeka Okafor	82	82	28.9	.530	.	.562	9.0	.7	.7	1.5	10.4
Chris Paul	45	45	38.0	.493	.409	.847	4.2	10.7	2.1	.2	18.7
Morris Peterson	46	39	21.2	.385	.363	.611	2.7	.9	.5	.1	7.1
James Posey	77	2	22.5	.365	.335	.825	4.3	1.5	.5	.2	5.2
Darius Songaila	75	1	18.8	.494	.167	.811	3.1	.9	.8	.2	7.2
Peja Stojakovic	62	55	31.4	.404	.375	.897	3.7	1.5	.8	.1	12.6
Marcus Thornton	73	17	25.6	.451	.374	.814	2.9	1.6	.8	.2	14.5
David West	81	81	36.4	.505	.259	.865	7.5	3.0	.9	.7	19.0
Julian Wright	68	14	12.8	.500	.333	.610	2.1	.6	.4	.3	3.8

== Awards, records and milestones ==
=== Awards ===
==== Week/Month ====
- Chris Paul was named Western Conference Player of the Month for February.
- Darren Collison was named Western Conference Rookie of the Month for February.

==== All-Star ====
- Chris Paul was selected as an All-Star reserve (third All-Star appearance; did not play due to injury).

==== Season ====
- Darren Collison, NBA All-Rookie Team 1st Team
- Marcus Thornton, NBA All-Rookie Team 2nd Team

=== Records ===
- On January 30, Darren Collison set a Hornets record for assists by a rookie with 18 against the Memphis Grizzlies.
- On February 23, Marcus Thornton set a Hornets record for most points scored in a quarter with 23.

== Transactions ==
=== Trades ===
July 28, 2009	To New Orleans Hornets Emeka Okafor	To Charlotte Bobcats Tyson Chandler
August 12, 2009	To New Orleans Hornets 2016 2nd Round Draft Pick	To Los Angeles Clippers Rasual Butler
September 9, 2009	To New Orleans Hornets Bobby Brown, Darius Songaila	To Minnesota Timberwolves Antonio Daniels
January 11, 2010	To New Orleans Hornets Cash Considerations, 2016 2nd Round Draft Pick	To Sacramento Kings Hilton Armstrong
January 25, 2010	To New Orleans Hornets Aaron Gray	To Chicago Bulls Devin Brown
January 26, 2010	To New Orleans Hornets 2014 2nd Round Draft Pick	To Los Angeles Clippers Bobby Brown

=== Free agents ===
==== Additions ====
Player	Signed	Former team
Ike Diogu	July 29	Indiana Pacers
Jason Hart	February 5	Minnesota Timberwolves

==== Subtractions ====
Player	Waived
Jason Hart	February 15
