= 2013–14 Sacramento Kings season =

NBA professional basketball team season

- Head coach: Michael Malone
- General manager: Pete D'Alessandro
- Owner: Vivek Ranadivé
- Arena: Sleep Train Arena

Results
- Record: 28–54 (.341)
- Place: Division: 4th (Pacific); Conference: 13th (Western)
- Playoff finish: Did not qualify
- Stats at Basketball Reference

Local media
- Television: Comcast Sports Net California & KXTV
- Radio: Sports Radio 1140 The Fan

The 2013–14 Sacramento Kings season was the 69th season of the franchise, and the 65th season in the National Basketball Association (NBA), and its 29th in Sacramento. It was also the first season under new owner, Vivek Ranadivé.

== Key dates ==
- June 27, 2013: The 2013 NBA draft took place at Barclays Center in Brooklyn, New York.

== Draft picks ==
| Round | Pick | Player | Position | Nationality | College |
|---|---|---|---|---|---|
| 1 | 7 | Ben McLemore | Guard | United States | Kansas |
| 2 | 36 | Ray McCallum, Jr. | Guard | United States | Detroit |

== Roster ==
2013–14 Sacramento Kings roster
Players

| Pos. | No. | Player | Height | Weight | DOB | From |
|---|---|---|---|---|---|---|
| F | 5 | Quincy Acy | 6 ft 7 in (2.01 m) | 225 lb (102 kg) | 1990-10-06 | Baylor |
| C | 15 | DeMarcus Cousins | 6 ft 11 in (2.11 m) | 270 lb (122 kg) | 1990-08-13 | Kentucky |
| G | 9 | Jared Cunningham | 6 ft 4 in (1.93 m) | 195 lb (88 kg) | 1991-02-22 | Oregon State |
| F | 30 | Reggie Evans | 6 ft 8 in (2.03 m) | 245 lb (111 kg) | 1980-05-18 | Iowa |
| F | 8 | Rudy Gay | 6 ft 8 in (2.03 m) | 230 lb (104 kg) | 1986-08-17 | Connecticut |
| C | 33 | Aaron Gray | 7 ft 0 in (2.13 m) | 270 lb (122 kg) | 1984-12-07 | Pittsburgh |
| F | 24 | Carl Landry | 6 ft 9 in (2.06 m) | 248 lb (112 kg) | 1983-09-19 | Purdue |
| G | 3 | Ray McCallum | 6 ft 3 in (1.91 m) | 190 lb (86 kg) | 1991-06-12 | Detroit Mercy |
| G | 16 | Ben McLemore | 6 ft 5 in (1.96 m) | 195 lb (88 kg) | 1993-02-11 | Kansas |
| F | 25 | Travis Outlaw | 6 ft 9 in (2.06 m) | 207 lb (94 kg) | 1984-09-18 | Starkville HS (MS) |
| F/C | 58 | Willie Reed | 6 ft 10 in (2.08 m) | 220 lb (100 kg) | 1990-05-16 | Saint Louis |
| G | 31 | Jason Terry | 6 ft 2 in (1.88 m) | 180 lb (82 kg) | 1977-09-15 | Arizona |
| G | 22 | Isaiah Thomas | 5 ft 9 in (1.75 m) | 185 lb (84 kg) | 1989–02–07 | Washington |
| F/C | 34 | Jason Thompson | 6 ft 11 in (2.11 m) | 250 lb (113 kg) | 1986-07-21 | Rider |
| F | 13 | Derrick Williams | 6 ft 8 in (2.03 m) | 240 lb (109 kg) | 1991-05-25 | Arizona |

Coaches
Head coach
- Michael Malone
Assistant(s)
- Chris Jent
- Micah Nori
- Corliss Williamson
- Dee Brown
- Ryan Bowen

Legend
- (DP) Unsigned draft pick
- (FA) Free agent
- (S) Suspended
- (DL) On assignment to D-League affiliate
- Injured

Roster
Updated: 2014-04-14

== Pre-season ==
2013 pre-season game log
Total: 5–2 (Home: 3–0; Road: 2–2)
Pre-season: 5–2 (home: 3–0; road: 2–2)

| Game | Date | Team | Score | High points | High rebounds | High assists | Location Attendance | Record |
|---|---|---|---|---|---|---|---|---|
| 1 | October 7 | @ Golden State | L 81–94 | Isaiah Thomas (15) | Jason Thompson (9) | Isaiah Thomas (6) | Oracle Arena; 17,821 | 0–1 |
| 2 | October 10 | @ L.A. Lakers | W 104–86 | Travis Outlaw (18) | DeMarcus Cousins (12) | Isaiah Thomas (9) | MGM Grand Garden Arena; 10,188 | 1–1 |
| 3 | October 14 | L.A. Clippers | W 99–88 | DeMarcus Cousins (31) | Thompson & Cousins (11) | Isaiah Thomas (5) | Sleep Train Arena; 12,122 | 2–1 |
| 4 | October 17 | Phoenix | W 107–90 | DeMarcus Cousins (29) | DeMarcus Cousins (9) | Jimmer Fredette (5) | Sleep Train Arena; 11,223 | 3–1 |
| 5 | October 20 | @ Portland | L 105–109 | Patrick Patterson (27) | Chuck Hayes (11) | Isaiah Thomas (10) | Moda Center; 17,357 | 3–2 |
| 6 | October 23 | Golden State | W 91–90 | Isaiah Thomas (21) | DeMarcus Cousins (9) | Salmons, Fredette, Vásquez, Thomas (3) | Sleep Train Arena; 12,260 | 4–2 |
| 7 | October 25 | @ L.A. Clippers | W 110–100 | Isaiah Thomas (27) | Jason Thompson (8) | Greivis Vásquez (12) | Staples Center; 15,082 | 5–2 |

2013–14 season schedule

== Regular season ==
=== Game log ===
2013–14 game log
Total: 28–54 (Home: 17–24; Road: 11–30)
October: 1–0 (home: 1–0; road: 0–0)

| Game | Date | Team | Score | High points | High rebounds | High assists | Location Attendance | Record |
|---|---|---|---|---|---|---|---|---|
| 1 | October 30 | Denver | W 90–88 | DeMarcus Cousins (30) | DeMarcus Cousins (14) | Isaiah Thomas (5) | Sleep Train Arena; 17,317 | 1–0 |

November : 3–10 (home: 2–6; road: 1–4)

| Game | Date | Team | Score | High points | High rebounds | High assists | Location Attendance | Record |
|---|---|---|---|---|---|---|---|---|
| 2 | November 1 | L.A. Clippers | L 101–110 | Isaiah Thomas (29) | DeMarcus Cousins (10) | Cousins, Vásquez, Thomas (4) | Sleep Train Arena; 17,317 | 1–1 |
| 3 | November 2 | @ Golden State | L 87–98 | Ben McLemore (19) | Travis Outlaw (12) | Isaiah Thomas (5) | Oracle Arena; 19,596 | 1–2 |
| 4 | November 5 | Atlanta | L 100–105 | Isaiah Thomas (26) | Patrick Patterson (9) | Salmons & Thomas (5) | Sleep Train Arena; 13,506 | 1–3 |
| 5 | November 8 | @ Portland | L 91–104 | DeMarcus Cousins (35) | DeMarcus Cousins (9) | Isaiah Thomas (7) | Moda Center; 17,627 | 1–4 |
| 6 | November 9 | Portland | L 85–96 | DeMarcus Cousins (33) | DeMarcus Cousins (12) | Greivis Vásquez (5) | Sleep Train Arena; 15,482 | 1–5 |
| 7 | November 13 | Brooklyn | W 107–86 | Marcus Thornton (24) | Jason Thompson (11) | Greivis Vásquez (12) | Sleep Train Arena; 15,122 | 2–5 |
| 8 | November 15 | Detroit | L 90–97 | DeMarcus Cousins (26) | DeMarcus Cousins (13) | Isaiah Thomas (7) | Sleep Train Arena; 17,317 | 2–6 |
| 9 | November 17 | Memphis | L 86–97 | Travis Outlaw (18) | Ndiaye & Outlaw (6) | John Salmons (5) | Sleep Train Arena; 15,630 | 2–7 |
| 10 | November 19 | Phoenix | W 107–104 | DeMarcus Cousins (27) | DeMarcus Cousins (12) | Greivis Vásquez (6) | Sleep Train Arena; 14,626 | 3–7 |
| 11 | November 20 | @ Phoenix | W 113–106 | Isaiah Thomas (23) | DeMarcus Cousins (12) | Greivis Vásquez (6) | US Airways Center; 12,705 | 4–7 |
| 12 | November 23 | @ L.A. Clippers | L 102–103 | DeMarcus Cousins (23) | DeMarcus Cousins (19) | DeMarcus Cousins (7) | Staples Center; 19,060 | 4–8 |
| 13 | November 24 | @ L.A. Lakers | L 86–100 | Greivis Vásquez (20) | DeMarcus Cousins (8) | DeMarcus Cousins (7) | Staples Center; 18,997 | 4–9 |
| 14 | November 29 | L.A. Clippers | L 98–104 (OT) | DeMarcus Cousins (25) | DeMarcus Cousins (9) | Greivis Vásquez (7) | Sleep Train Arena; 17,317 | 4–10 |

December: 6–10 (home: 3–5; road: 3–5)

| Game | Date | Team | Score | High points | High rebounds | High assists | Location Attendance | Record |
|---|---|---|---|---|---|---|---|---|
| 15 | December 1 | Golden State | L 113–115 | DeMarcus Cousins (24) | Derrick Williams(7) | Isaiah Thomas (8) | Sleep Train Arena; 15,588 | 4–11 |
| 16 | December 3 | Oklahoma City | L 95–97 | Isaiah Thomas (24) | Jason Thompson (10) | Greivis Vásquez (7) | Sleep Train Arena; 15,089 | 4–12 |
| 17 | December 6 | L.A. Lakers | L 100–106 | McLemore & Cousins (20) | DeMarcus Cousins (11) | Isaiah Thomas (9) | Sleep Train Arena; 17,317 | 4–13 |
| 18 | December 7 | @ Utah | W 112–102 (OT) | DeMarcus Cousins (28) | Ben McLemore (9) | Isaiah Thomas (8) | EnergySolutions Arena; 16,500 | 5–13 |
| 19 | December 9 | Dallas | W 112–97 | DeMarcus Cousins (32) | DeMarcus Cousins (19) | Isaiah Thomas (12) | Sleep Train Arena; 15,329 | 6–13 |
| 20 | December 11 | Utah | L 101–122 | Isaiah Thomas (20) | DeMarcus Cousins (11) | Isaiah Thomas (7) | Sleep Train Arena; 15,198 | 6–14 |
| 21 | December 13 | @ Phoenix | L 107–116 | Isaiah Thomas (29) | DeMarcus Cousins (16) | DeMarcus Cousins (5) | US Airways Center; 14,128 | 6–15 |
| 22 | December 15 | Houston | W 106–91 | Rudy Gay (26) | DeMarcus Cousins (10) | Isaiah Thomas (8) | Sleep Train Arena; 15,606 | 7–15 |
| 23 | December 17 | @ Charlotte | L 87–95 | DeMarcus Cousins (30) | DeMarcus Cousins (17) | DeMarcus Cousins (6) | Time Warner Cable Arena; 11,339 | 7–16 |
| 24 | December 18 | @ Atlanta | L 107–124 | DeMarcus Cousins (28) | Cousins & Thompson (7) | Isaiah Thomas (10) | Philips Arena; 10,185 | 7–17 |
| 25 | December 20 | @ Miami | L 103–122 | DeMarcus Cousins (27) | DeMarcus Cousins (8) | Isaiah Thomas (7) | American Airlines Arena; 19,600 | 7–18 |
| 26 | December 21 | @ Orlando | W 105–100 | Gay & Thomas (23) | DeMarcus Cousins (11) | Isaiah Thomas (9) | Amway Center; 14,283 | 8–18 |
| 27 | December 23 | New Orleans | L 100–113 | DeMarcus Cousins (24) | DeMarcus Cousins (14) | Isaiah Thomas (5) | Sleep Train Arena; 17,317 | 8–19 |
| 28 | December 27 | Miami | W 108–103 (OT) | DeMarcus Cousins (27) | DeMarcus Cousins (17) | Isaiah Thomas (11) | Sleep Train Arena; 17,317 | 9–19 |
| 29 | December 29 | @ San Antonio | L 104–112 | DeMarcus Cousins (29) | DeMarcus Cousins (14) | Isaiah Thomas (9) | AT&T Center; 18,581 | 9–20 |
| 30 | December 31 | @ Houston | W 110–106 | Rudy Gay (25) | DeMarcus Cousins (16) | Isaiah Thomas (10) | Toyota Center; 18,232 | 10–20 |

January: 5–11 (home: 3–4; road: 2–7)

| Game | Date | Team | Score | High points | High rebounds | High assists | Location Attendance | Record |
|---|---|---|---|---|---|---|---|---|
| 31 | January 2 | Philadelphia | L 104–113 | DeMarcus Cousins (33) | DeMarcus Cousins (14) | Isaiah Thomas (7) | Sleep Train Arena; 16,259 | 10–21 |
| 32 | January 4 | Charlotte | L 103–113 | DeMarcus Cousins (26) | Jason Thompson (14) | Isaiah Thomas (8) | Sleep Train Arena; 16,410 | 10–22 |
| 33 | January 7 | Portland | W 123–119 | DeMarcus Cousins (35) | DeMarcus Cousins (13) | Isaiah Thomas (8) | Sleep Train Arena; 15,518 | 11–22 |
| 34 | January 10 | Orlando | W 103–83 | DeMarcus Cousins (24) | DeMarcus Cousins (14) | Isaiah Thomas (7) | Sleep Train Arena; 15,694 | 12–22 |
| 35 | January 12 | Cleveland | W 124–80 | Isaiah Thomas (26) | Jason Thompson (16) | Isaiah Thomas (6) | Sleep Train Arena; 16,072 | 13–22 |
| 36 | January 14 | @ Indiana | L 92–116 | DeMarcus Cousins (31) | DeMarcus Cousins (13) | Jimmer Fredette (4) | Bankers Life Fieldhouse; 17,530 | 13–23 |
| 37 | January 15 | @ Minnesota | W 111–108 | Rudy Gay (33) | DeMarcus Cousins (11) | Isaiah Thomas (7) | Target Center; 12,399 | 14–23 |
| 38 | January 17 | @ Memphis | L 90–91 | DeMarcus Cousins (22) | DeMarcus Cousins (17) | Isaiah Thomas (9) | FedExForum; 17,212 | 14–24 |
| 39 | January 19 | @ Oklahoma City | L 93–108 | Isaiah Thomas (38) | DeMarcus Cousins (14) | Isaiah Thomas (6) | Chesapeake Energy Arena; 18,203 | 14–25 |
| 40 | January 21 | @ New Orleans | W 114–97 | Rudy Gay (41) | DeMarcus Cousins (11) | Isaiah Thomas (11) | New Orleans Arena; 16,459 | 15–25 |
| 41 | January 22 | @ Houston | L 98–119 | Derrick Williams (22) | Derrick Williams (11) | Isaiah Thomas (6) | Toyota Center; 16,488 | 15–26 |
| 42 | January 24 | Indiana | L 111–116 (OT) | Marcus Thornton (42) | Derrick Williams (11) | Isaiah Thomas (6) | Sleep Train Arena; 17,317 | 15–27 |
| 43 | January 26 | Denver | L 117–125 | Isaiah Thomas (22) | Jason Thompson (10) | Isaiah Thomas (8) | Sleep Train Arena; 15,939 | 15–28 |
| 44 | January 27 | @ Utah | L 99–106 | Jason Thompson (19) | Derrick Williams (15) | Isaiah Thomas (6) | EnergySolutions Arena; 16,663 | 15–29 |
| 45 | January 29 | Memphis | L 89–99 | Isaiah Thomas (24) | Jason Thompson (7) | Gay & Thomas (5) | Sleep Train Arena; 15,195 | 15–30 |
| 46 | January 31 | @ Dallas | L 103–107 | Rudy Gay (35) | Rudy Gay (12) | Gay & Thomas (6) | American Airlines Center; 19,614 | 15–31 |

February : 5–7 (home: 3–2; road: 2–5)

| Game | Date | Team | Score | High points | High rebounds | High assists | Location Attendance | Record |
|---|---|---|---|---|---|---|---|---|
| 47 | February 1 | @ San Antonio | L 93–95 | Isaiah Thomas (26) | Quincy Acy (10) | Rudy Gay (6) | AT&T Center; 18,581 | 15–32 |
| 48 | February 3 | Chicago | W 99–70 | DeMarcus Cousins (25) | DeMarcus Cousins (16) | Cousins & Fredette (4) | Sleep Train Arena; 15,178 | 16–32 |
| 49 | February 5 | Toronto | W 109–101 | DeMarcus Cousins (25) | Cousins, Gay & Thompson (10) | Isaiah Thomas (5) | Sleep Train Arena; 17,317 | 17–32 |
| 50 | February 7 | @ Boston | L 89–99 | DeMarcus Cousins (31) | DeMarcus Cousins (16) | Isaiah Thomas (6) | TD Garden; 18,624 | 17–33 |
| 51 | February 9 | @ Washington | L 84–93 | Isaiah Thomas (30) | DeMarcus Cousins (12) | Isaiah Thomas (8) | Verizon Center; 18,173 | 17–34 |
| 52 | February 11 | @ Cleveland | L 99–109 | DeMarcus Cousins (21) | DeMarcus Cousins (10) | Isaiah Thomas (8) | Quicken Loans Arena; 14,245 | 17–35 |
| 53 | February 12 | @ New York | W 106–101 (OT) | Jimmer Fredette (24) | DeMarcus Cousins (14) | Isaiah Thomas (7) | Madison Square Garden; 19,812 | 18–35 |
All-Star Break
| 54 | February 19 | Golden State | L 92–101 | Isaiah Thomas (26) | Quincy Acy (12) | Isaiah Thomas (7) | Sleep Train Arena; 17,317 | 18–36 |
| 55 | February 22 | Boston | W 105–98 | Rudy Gay (22) | Cousins & Gay (7) | Isaiah Thomas (12) | Sleep Train Arena; 17,317 | 19–36 |
| 56 | February 23 | @ Denver | W 109–95 | Isaiah Thomas (33) | Rudy Gay (11) | Isaiah Thomas (6) | Pepsi Center; 16,263 | 20–36 |
| 57 | February 25 | Houston | L 103–129 | Rudy Gay (25) | Reggie Evans (8) | Rudy Gay (6) | Sleep Train Arena; 16,057 | 20–37 |
| 58 | February 28 | @ L.A. Lakers | L 122–126 | Rudy Gay (32) | Derrick Williams (12) | Isaiah Thomas (8) | Staples Center; 18,997 | 20–38 |

March : 6–10 (home: 3–3; road: 3–7)

| Game | Date | Team | Score | High points | High rebounds | High assists | Location Attendance | Record |
|---|---|---|---|---|---|---|---|---|
| 59 | March 1 | Minnesota | L 97–108 | Rudy Gay (24) | DeMarcus Cousins (17) | Isaiah Thomas (8) | Sleep Train Arena; 17,085 | 20–39 |
| 60 | March 3 | New Orleans | W 96–89 | DeMarcus Cousins (23) | Reggie Evans (13) | Isaiah Thomas (5) | Sleep Train Arena; 16,225 | 21–39 |
| 61 | March 5 | @ Milwaukee | W 116–102 | Isaiah Thomas (25) | Jason Thompson (13) | Gay & Thomas (6) | BMO Harris Bradley Center; 11,079 | 22–39 |
| 62 | March 7 | @ Toronto | L 87–99 | DeMarcus Cousins (24) | Reggie Evans (10) | Isaiah Thomas (5) | Air Canada Centre; 18,188 | 22–40 |
| 63 | March 9 | @ Brooklyn | L 89–104 | DeMarcus Cousins (28) | DeMarcus Cousins (20) | Isaiah Thomas (4) | Barclays Center; 17,732 | 22–41 |
| 64 | March 11 | @ Detroit | L 89–99 | Rudy Gay (20) | DeMarcus Cousins (14) | Isaiah Thomas (8) | Palace of Auburn Hills; 15,234 | 22–42 |
| 65 | March 12 | @ Philadelphia | W 115–98 | Rudy Gay (27) | DeMarcus Cousins (12) | Isaiah Thomas (6) | Wells Fargo Center; 11,109 | 23–42 |
| 66 | March 15 | @ Chicago | L 87–94 | Isaiah Thomas (26) | DeMarcus Cousins (14) | Isaiah Thomas (5) | United Center; 22,012 | 23–43 |
| 67 | March 16 | @ Minnesota | L 102–104 | Isaiah Thomas (27) | Derrick Williams (11) | Isaiah Thomas (7) | Target Center; 13,171 | 23–44 |
| 68 | March 18 | Washington | W 117–111 (OT) | Gay, Cousins & Thomas (24) | DeMarcus Cousins (14) | Isaiah Thomas (10) | Sleep Train Arena; 16,084 | 24–44 |
| 69 | March 21 | San Antonio | L 79–99 | Isaiah Thomas (18) | DeMarcus Cousins (13) | DeMarcus Cousins (5) | Sleep Train Arena; 17,317 | 24–45 |
| 70 | March 23 | Milwaukee | W 124–107 | DeMarcus Cousins (32) | DeMarcus Cousins (12) | Isaiah Thomas (8) | Sleep Train Arena; 16,341 | 25–45 |
| 71 | March 26 | New York | L 99–107 | DeMarcus Cousins (32) | DeMarcus Cousins (15) | DeMarcus Cousins (8) | Sleep Train Arena; 15,594 | 25–46 |
| 72 | March 28 | @ Oklahoma City | L 81–94 | Ben McLemore (18) | Jason Thompson (14) | Ray McCallum, Jr. (5) | Chesapeake Energy Arena; 18,203 | 25–47 |
| 73 | March 29 | @ Dallas | L 100–103 | Rudy Gay (30) | Reggie Evans (18) | Ray McCallum, Jr. (8) | American Airlines Center; 20,210 | 25–48 |
| 74 | March 31 | @ New Orleans | W 102–97 | DeMarcus Cousins (35) | DeMarcus Cousins (14) | Ray McCallum, Jr. (10) | Smoothie King Center; 15,548 | 26–48 |

April : 2–6 (home: 2–3; road: 0–3)

| Game | Date | Team | Score | High points | High rebounds | High assists | Location Attendance | Record |
|---|---|---|---|---|---|---|---|---|
| 75 | April 2 | L.A. Lakers | W 107–102 | Rudy Gay (31) | Jason Thompson (12) | Ray McCallum, Jr. (5) | Sleep Train Arena; 17,317 | 27–48 |
| 76 | April 4 | @ Golden State | L 69–102 | DeMarcus Cousins (19) | DeMarcus Cousins (11) | Ray McCallum, Jr. (10) | Oracle Arena; 19,596 | 27–49 |
| 77 | April 6 | Dallas | L 91–93 | Rudy Gay (32) | DeMarcus Cousins (10) | Ray McCallum, Jr. (9) | Sleep Train Arena; 17,023 | 27–50 |
| 78 | April 8 | Oklahoma City | L 92–107 | Cousins & Outlaw (24) | DeMarcus Cousins (14) | Ray McCallum, Jr. (5) | Sleep Train Arena; 16,696 | 27–51 |
| 79 | April 9 | @ Portland | L 99–100 | DeMarcus Cousins (30) | DeMarcus Cousins (12) | Ray McCallum, Jr. (8) | Moda Center; 20,002 | 27–52 |
| 80 | April 12 | @ L.A. Clippers | L 101–117 | DeMarcus Cousins (32) | Reggie Evans (14) | Ray McCallum, Jr. (8) | Staples Center; 19,060 | 27–53 |
| 81 | April 13 | Minnesota | W 106–103 | DeMarcus Cousins (35) | DeMarcus Cousins (15) | McLemore & Cousins (6) | Sleep Train Arena; 16,965 | 28–53 |
| 82 | April 16 | Phoenix | L 99–104 | Ben McLemore (31) | Aaron Gray (13) | Ben McLemore (5) | Sleep Train Arena; 17,317 | 28–54 |

2013–14 season schedule

=== Standings ===
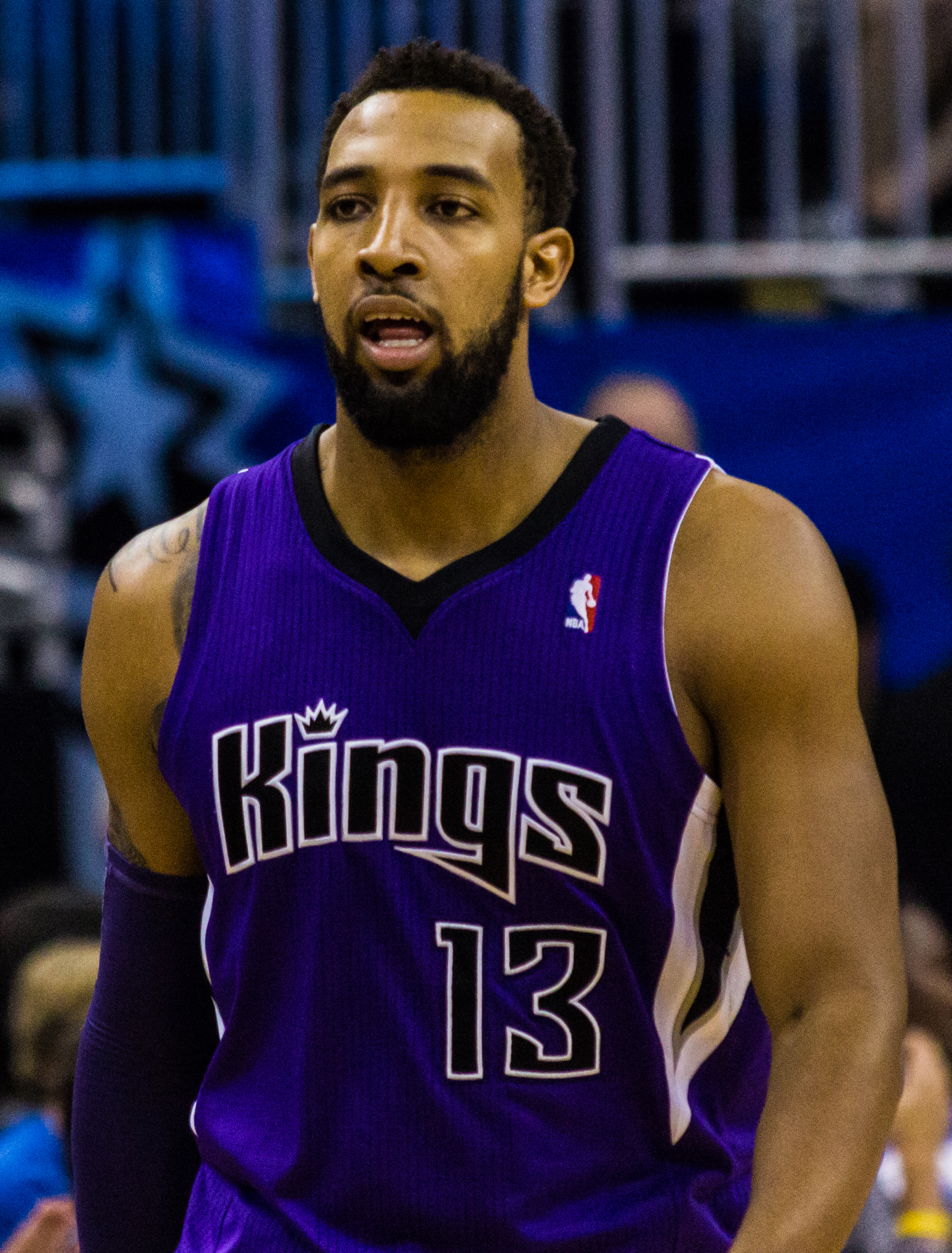
Derrick Williams

| Pacific Division | W | L | PCT | GB | Home | Road | Div | GP |
|---|---|---|---|---|---|---|---|---|
| y-Los Angeles Clippers | 57 | 25 | .695 | – | 34‍–‍7 | 23‍–‍18 | 12–4 | 82 |
| x-Golden State Warriors | 51 | 31 | .622 | 6.0 | 27‍–‍14 | 24‍–‍17 | 11–5 | 82 |
| Phoenix Suns | 48 | 34 | .585 | 9.0 | 26‍–‍15 | 22‍–‍19 | 8–8 | 82 |
| Sacramento Kings | 28 | 54 | .341 | 29.0 | 17‍–‍24 | 11‍–‍30 | 3–13 | 82 |
| Los Angeles Lakers | 27 | 55 | .329 | 30.0 | 14‍–‍27 | 13‍–‍28 | 6–10 | 82 |

Western Conference
| # | Team | W | L | PCT | GB | GP |
|---|---|---|---|---|---|---|
| 1 | z-San Antonio Spurs * | 62 | 20 | .756 | – | 82 |
| 2 | y-Oklahoma City Thunder * | 59 | 23 | .720 | 3.0 | 82 |
| 3 | y-Los Angeles Clippers * | 57 | 25 | .695 | 5.0 | 82 |
| 4 | x-Houston Rockets | 54 | 28 | .659 | 8.0 | 82 |
| 5 | x-Portland Trail Blazers | 54 | 28 | .659 | 8.0 | 82 |
| 6 | x-Golden State Warriors | 51 | 31 | .622 | 11.0 | 82 |
| 7 | x-Memphis Grizzlies | 50 | 32 | .610 | 12.0 | 82 |
| 8 | x-Dallas Mavericks | 49 | 33 | .598 | 13.0 | 82 |
| 9 | Phoenix Suns | 48 | 34 | .585 | 14.0 | 82 |
| 10 | Minnesota Timberwolves | 40 | 42 | .488 | 22.0 | 82 |
| 11 | Denver Nuggets | 36 | 46 | .439 | 26.0 | 82 |
| 12 | New Orleans Pelicans | 34 | 48 | .415 | 28.0 | 82 |
| 13 | Sacramento Kings | 28 | 54 | .341 | 34.0 | 82 |
| 14 | Los Angeles Lakers | 27 | 55 | .329 | 35.0 | 82 |
| 15 | Utah Jazz | 25 | 57 | .305 | 37.0 | 82 |

== Player statistics ==
Legend
| GP | Games played | GS | Games started | MPG | Minutes per game |
| FG% | Field-goal percentage | 3P% | 3-point field-goal percentage | FT% | Free-throw percentage |
| RPG | Rebounds per game | APG | Assists per game | SPG | Steals per game |
| BPG | Blocks per game | PPG | Points per game |

=== Regular season ===
| Player | GP | GS | MPG | FG% | 3P% | FT% | RPG | APG | SPG | BPG | PPG |
|---|---|---|---|---|---|---|---|---|---|---|---|
| Jason Thompson | 82 | 61 | 24.5 | .506 | | .579 | 6.4 | .6 | .4 | .7 | 7.1 |
| Ben McLemore | 82 | 55 | 26.7 | .376 | .320 | .804 | 2.9 | 1.0 | .5 | .2 | 8.8 |
| Isaiah Thomas | 72 | 54 | 34.7 | .453 | .349 | .850 | 2.9 | 6.3 | 1.3 | .1 | 20.3 |
| DeMarcus Cousins | 71 | 71 | 32.4 | .496 | .000 | .726 | 11.7 | 2.9 | 1.5 | 1.3 | 22.7 |
| Derrick Williams^{†} | 67 | 15 | 24.7 | .437 | .286 | .708 | 4.4 | .8 | .7 | .2 | 8.5 |
| Travis Outlaw | 63 | 4 | 16.9 | .399 | .350 | .808 | 2.7 | .8 | .3 | .3 | 5.4 |
| Quincy Acy^{†} | 56 | 0 | 14.0 | .472 | .200 | .667 | 3.6 | .4 | .3 | .4 | 2.7 |
| Rudy Gay^{†} | 55 | 55 | 34.4 | .482 | .312 | .836 | 5.5 | 3.1 | 1.2 | .6 | 20.1 |
| Marcus Thornton^{†} | 46 | 26 | 24.4 | .381 | .318 | .808 | 2.7 | 1.0 | .7 | .2 | 8.3 |
| Ray McCallum Jr. | 45 | 10 | 19.9 | .377 | .373 | .744 | 1.8 | 2.7 | .5 | .2 | 6.2 |
| Jimmer Fredette^{†} | 41 | 0 | 11.3 | .475 | .493 | .895 | 1.1 | 1.5 | .3 | .1 | 5.9 |
| Aaron Gray^{†} | 33 | 6 | 10.2 | .431 | .000 | .556 | 3.1 | .6 | .3 | .2 | 1.8 |
| Reggie Evans^{†} | 24 | 14 | 20.8 | .527 | | .569 | 7.7 | .7 | 1.0 | .0 | 5.5 |
| Greivis Vásquez^{†} | 18 | 18 | 25.8 | .433 | .320 | .938 | 1.9 | 5.3 | .3 | .1 | 9.8 |
| John Salmons^{†} | 18 | 8 | 24.7 | .350 | .381 | 1.000 | 2.6 | 2.4 | .7 | .4 | 5.8 |
| Carl Landry | 18 | 1 | 12.9 | .517 | | .824 | 3.2 | .3 | .2 | .1 | 4.2 |
| Patrick Patterson^{†} | 17 | 6 | 24.4 | .410 | .231 | .563 | 5.8 | .9 | .8 | .2 | 6.9 |
| Chuck Hayes^{†} | 16 | 1 | 11.2 | .438 | | .714 | 2.9 | .4 | .7 | .1 | 2.1 |
| Hamady N'Diaye | 14 | 0 | 5.3 | .333 | | .000 | 1.3 | .2 | .0 | .3 | .4 |
| Luc Mbah a Moute^{†} | 9 | 5 | 21.8 | .469 | .333 | .692 | 3.0 | 1.7 | 1.0 | .6 | 4.4 |
| Jared Cunningham^{†} | 8 | 0 | 7.3 | .263 | .167 | .929 | .6 | .6 | .4 | .0 | 3.0 |
| Orlando Johnson^{†} | 7 | 0 | 7.1 | .176 | .167 | .500 | .6 | .6 | .0 | .1 | 1.3 |
| Royce White | 3 | 0 | 3.0 | .000 | | | .0 | .0 | .0 | .0 | .0 |

- ^{†} Denotes player spent time with another team in the season. Stats reflect time with the Kings only.

== Transactions ==
=== Overview ===
Players Added

Via draft

- Ray McCallum
- Ben McLemore

Via trade

- Quincy Acy
- Reggie Evans
- Rudy Gay
- Aaron Gray
- Roger Mason, Jr.
- Luc Mbah a Moute
- Jason Terry
- Greivis Vásquez
- Derrick Williams

Via free agency

- Carl Landry
Players Lost

Via trade

- Chuck Hayes
- Luc Mbah a Moute
- Patrick Patterson
- John Salmons
- Marcus Thornton
- Greivis Vásquez

Via free agency

- Cole Aldrich
- Toney Douglas
- Tyreke Evans (sign and trade)
- James Johnson

Waived

- Roger Mason, Jr.
- Hamady N'Diaye
