= Jason Thompson (basketball) =

American basketball player (born 1986)

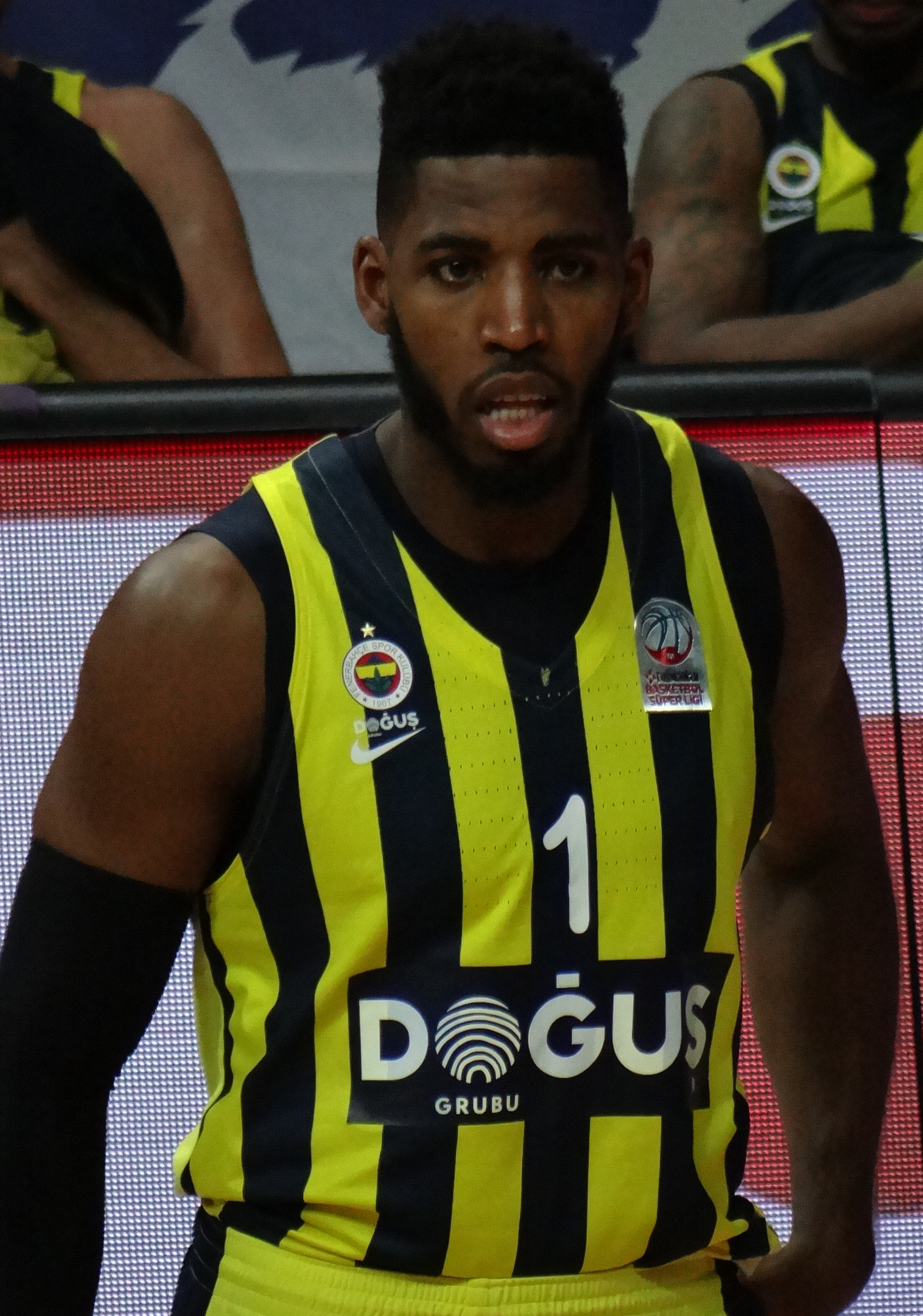
- Thompson with Fenerbahçe Doğuş in 2017

Capital City Go-Go
- Title: Assistant coach
- League: NBA G League

Personal information
- Born: July 21, 1986 (age 40) Mount Laurel, New Jersey, U.S.
- Listed height: 6 ft 11 in (2.11 m)
- Listed weight: 250 lb (113 kg)

Career information
- High school: Lenape (Medford, New Jersey)
- College: Rider (2004–2008)
- NBA draft: 2008: 1st round, 12th overall pick
- Drafted by: Sacramento Kings
- Playing career: 2008–2021
- Position: Center / power forward
- Number: 34, 1, 2
- Coaching career: 2022–present

Career history

Playing
- 2008–2015: Sacramento Kings
- 2015–2016: Golden State Warriors
- 2016: Toronto Raptors
- 2016–2017: Shandong Golden Stars
- 2017–2018: Fenerbahçe Doğuş
- 2018–2019: Sichuan Blue Whales
- 2019–2020: Beijing Royal Fighters
- 2020–2021: Casademont Zaragoza
- 2021: Guangdong Southern Tigers

Coaching
- 2022–2024: Rider (assistant)
- 2024–2025: Sioux Falls Skyforce (assistant)
- 2025–present: Capital City Go-Go (assistant)

Career highlights
- CBA champion (2021); CBA rebounding leader (2019); Turkish President's Cup winner (2017); MAAC Player of the Year (2008); Haggerty Award (2008); 2× First-team All-MAAC (2007, 2008); Second-team All-MAAC (2006); No. 1 retired by Rider Broncs
- Stats at NBA.com
- Stats at Basketball Reference

Jason Carlton Thompson (born July 21, 1986) is an American former professional basketball player and current assistant coach for the Capital City Go-Go of the NBA G League. He was a starting center playing college basketball for the Rider Broncs from 2004 to 2008, and was drafted in the first round of the 2008 NBA draft by the Sacramento Kings. He holds the record for most games played with the Kings during their tenure in Sacramento.

== College career ==
A native of Mount Laurel, New Jersey, Thompson led Lenape High School to the 2004 New Jersey Group IV state title.

Thompson went on to play four seasons of college basketball for the Rider Broncs men's basketball from 2004 to 2008, where he was one of three players in the NCAA in 2006–07 to average 20 points and 10 rebounds per game. The other two were Kevin Durant of Texas and Nick Fazekas of Nevada.

As a senior during the 2007–08 season, Thompson averaged 20.4 points, 12.1 rebounds, 2.7 assists, 2.7 blocks and 1.1 steals per game. His strongest performance came on March 9, 2008, when he recorded 32 points and 18 rebounds against Marist College. He led Rider to the 2008 Metro Atlantic Athletic Conference Tournament finale against Siena College a day later. Rider fell short in a 74–53 loss in which Thompson registered 22 points and 12 rebounds. Rider finished the regular season and conference tournament schedule with a strong 23–10 record, but still missed an at-large bid to the NIT. However, Rider did receive a bid to the inaugural College Basketball Invitational tournament in 2008. Rider lost its first-round game to the Old Dominion Monarchs 68–65; Thompson finished with 15 points, 17 rebounds and 3 blocks. He concluded his collegiate career as the all-time leading rebounder in Broncs history.

== Professional career ==
=== Sacramento Kings (2008–2015) ===
Thompson was selected with the 12th overall pick by the Sacramento Kings in the 2008 NBA draft. On July 8, 2008, he signed his rookie scale contract with the Kings. As a rookie in 2008–09, he played all 82 games for the Kings while averaging 11.1 points and 7.4 rebounds per game.

On October 25, 2009, the Kings exercised their third-year team option on Thompson's rookie scale contract, extending the contract through the 2010–11 season. He went on to have a career-best season as he averaged 12.5 points and 8.5 rebounds per game.

On October 25, 2010, the Kings exercised their fourth-year team option on Thompson's rookie scale contract, extending the contract through the 2011–12 season.

On June 25, 2012, the Kings tendered a qualifying offer to make Thompson a restricted free agent. On July 12, 2012, he re-signed with the Kings to a multi-year deal.

=== Golden State Warriors (2015–2016) ===
On July 10, 2015, Thompson was traded to the Philadelphia 76ers along with Carl Landry, Nik Stauskas, a future first-round pick, and the rights to swap first-round picks in 2016 and 2017, in exchange for the rights to Artūras Gudaitis and Luka Mitrović. On July 31, the 76ers traded Thompson to the Golden State Warriors in exchange for Gerald Wallace, cash and draft considerations. On February 22, 2016, he was waived by the Warriors. He appeared in just 28 games for the Warriors, and managed just 6.4 minutes per game.

=== Toronto Raptors (2016) ===
On March 1, 2016, Thompson signed with the Toronto Raptors. He appeared in 19 games for the Raptors to conclude the 2015–16 regular season, and was part of the Raptors' post-season run that saw them reach the Eastern Conference Finals for the first time in franchise history. In his first season playing in the post-season, Thompson played a minor role off the bench, managing just 5.5 minutes per game over 10 appearances.

=== Shandong Golden Stars (2016–2017) ===
In August 2016, Thompson signed with the Shandong Golden Stars for the 2016–17 CBA season.

In the summer of 2017, Thompson competed in The Basketball Tournament on ESPN for the Rebel Riders; a team composed of Rider University basketball alum. In their first-round matchup, Thompson scored 14 points and grabbed a game-high 18 rebounds in the Rebel Riders' 78–70 loss to Team Fancy.

=== Fenerbahçe (2017–2018) ===
On July 29, 2017, Thompson signed with the Turkish club Fenerbahçe for the 2017–18 season. In 2017–18 EuroLeague, Fenerbahçe made it to the 2018 EuroLeague Final Four, its fourth consecutive Final Four appearance. Eventually, they lost to Real Madrid with 80–85 in the final game. Over 36 EuroLeague games, he averaged 5 points and 3.9 rebounds per game. On July 10, 2018, Fenerbahçe and Thompson parted ways.

=== Sichuan Blue Whales (2018–2019) ===
On August 11, 2018, Thompson signed a deal with Sichuan Blue Whales in the Chinese Basketball Association.

=== Casademont Zaragoza (2020–2021) ===
On February 1, 2020, Thompson signed with Casademont Zaragoza of the Liga ACB. He averaged 8.0 points and 6.3 rebounds per game between ACB and BCL. Thompson re-signed with the team on August 4.

=== Guangdong Southern Tigers (2021) ===
On February 9, 2021, Thompson signed with Shanghai Sharks of the Chinese Basketball Association.

On April 4, 2021, Thompson signed with Guangdong Southern Tigers.

On January 7, 2022, Thompson was acquired via available player pool by the Wisconsin Herd, but never played for the team.

== Coaching career ==
On October 3, 2022, Thompson announced his retirement from professional basketball and became an assistant coach for the Rider Broncs.

For the 2024–25 season, Thompson became an assistant coach for the Sioux Falls Skyforce of the NBA G League. The following season he joined Cody Toppert's staff with the Capital City Go-Go.

== Career statistics ==
Legend
GP	Games played	GS	Games started	MPG	Minutes per game
FG%	Field-goal percentage	3P%	3-point field-goal percentage	FT%	Free-throw percentage
RPG	Rebounds per game	APG	Assists per game	SPG	Steals per game
BPG	Blocks per game	PPG	Points per game	PIR	Performance index rating
**Bold**	Career high

=== NBA ===
*	Led the league

==== Regular season ====
Year	Team	GP	GS	MPG	FG%	3P%	FT%	RPG	APG	SPG	BPG	PPG
2008–09	Sacramento	**82***	56	28.1	.497	.000	.692	7.4	1.1	.6	.7	11.1
2009–10	Sacramento	75	58	**31.4**	.472	**.100**	.715	**8.5**	**1.7**	.5	**1.0**	**12.5**
2010–11	Sacramento	75	39	23.3	.507	.000	.605	6.1	1.2	.4	.6	8.8
2011–12	Sacramento	64	47	25.9	**.535**	.000	.602	6.9	1.2	**.7**	.7	9.1
2012–13	Sacramento	**82***	**81**	27.9	.502	.000	.694	6.7	1.0	.6	.7	10.9
2013–14	Sacramento	**82**	61	24.5	.506	.000	.579	6.4	.6	.4	.7	7.1
2014–15	Sacramento	81	63	24.6	.470	.000	.622	6.5	1.0	.4	.7	6.1
2015–16	Golden State	28	1	6.4	.476	.000	.625	1.9	.7	.1	.3	2.1
2015–16	Toronto	19	6	15.4	.485	.333	.818	4.2	.5	.4	.6	4.6
Career		588	412	25.2	.496	.143	.657	6.6	1.1	.5	.7	8.9

==== Playoffs ====
Year	Team	GP	GS	MPG	FG%	3P%	FT%	RPG	APG	SPG	BPG	PPG
2016	Toronto	10	0	5.5	.444	.000	.000	1.1	.1	.0	.1	.8
Career		10	0	5.5	.444	.000	.000	1.1	.1	.0	.1	.8

=== EuroLeague ===
*	Led the league

Year	Team	GP	GS	MPG	FG%	3P%	FT%	RPG	APG	SPG	BPG	PPG	PIR
2017–18	Fenerbahçe	36*	18	16.0	.533	—	.618	3.9	.8	.1	.6	5.0	6.1
Career		36	18	16.0	.533	—	.618	3.9	.8	.1	.6	5.0	6.1

== Personal life ==
Thompson's younger brother, Ryan, also played college basketball for Rider University and went on to play professionally in Europe.

== See also ==
- List of NCAA Division I men's basketball players with 2,000 points and 1,000 rebounds
