= Kenny Thomas (basketball) =

American basketball player (born 1977)

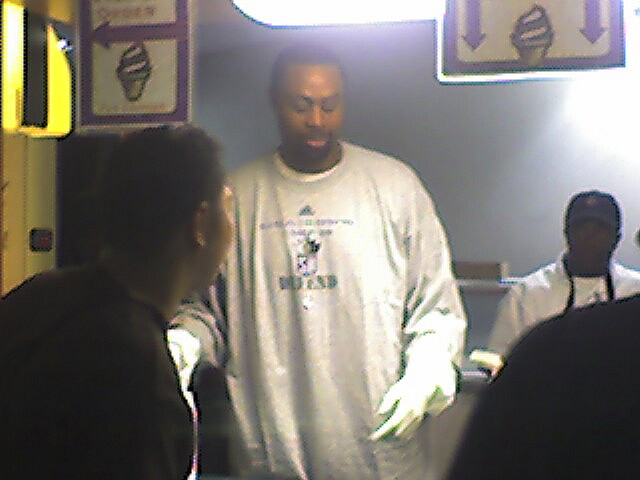
- Thomas in 2006

Personal information
- Born: July 25, 1977 (age 49) Atlanta, Georgia, U.S.
- Listed height: 6 ft 7 in (2.01 m)
- Listed weight: 245 lb (111 kg)

Career information
- High school: Austin (El Paso, Texas); Albuquerque (Albuquerque, New Mexico)
- College: New Mexico (1995–1999)
- NBA draft: 1999: 1st round, 22nd overall pick
- Drafted by: Houston Rockets
- Playing career: 1999–2010
- Position: Power forward / center
- Number: 21, 9

Career history
- 1999–2002: Houston Rockets
- 2002–2005: Philadelphia 76ers
- 2005–2010: Sacramento Kings

Career highlights
- Second-team All-American – SN (1998); Third-team All-American – NABC (1998); 3× First-team All-WAC (1996, 1998, 1999); Third-team Parade All-American (1995)
- Stats at NBA.com
- Stats at Basketball Reference
Medals
Men's basketball
Representing United States
Summer Universiade
Gold medal – first place	1997 Trapani	Team competition

Kenneth Cornelius Thomas (born July 25, 1977) is an American former professional basketball player who played eleven seasons in the National Basketball Association (NBA).

== High school career ==
He attended Austin High School, in El Paso, Texas, for three seasons before moving to Albuquerque, New Mexico to play for Albuquerque High School during his senior season. Averaging 25.2 points and 16.9 rebounds each game, Thomas helped Albuquerque to a 22–3 record and Class 4A state title. Parade named him a boys' basketball All-American in 1995.

== College career ==
Thomas attended the University of New Mexico in Albuquerque, one of the highest-profile recruits to ever attend the school. He is second on the Lobos' all-time scoring list (1,931 points), career blocks list (239), and career dunks list (114), and leads the school's lists in career rebounds (1,032), freshman scoring (484) and rebounding (256), and personal fouls for a season (118) and career (383). Thomas is one of eight Lobos to be selected as an All-American (1998). Kenny led the Lobos to four consecutive NCAA Tournament first round wins. UNM was an amazing 71–3 in The Pit in Kenny's four years with the Lobos including 41 consecutive wins.

== NBA career ==
The Houston Rockets selected Thomas as the 22nd pick in the 1999 NBA draft. He led his team in rebounds for the 1999–2000 season, making him one of only two rookies to do so. Thomas was consistently among the team leaders in rebounds and blocked shots before being traded to the Philadelphia 76ers during the 2002–03 season. He was then named, The "K9".

Thomas was one of only eleven players to average a double-double for the 2003–04 season, and the shortest one at 6-foot, 7-inches.

On February 23, 2005, Thomas was traded to the Sacramento Kings in a deal that sent Chris Webber to Philadelphia. On February 18, 2010, the Kings released Thomas after the trade deadline.

Thomas was invited to the Memphis Grizzlies 2010 pre-season camp, but was waived on October 11.

== After basketball ==
=== Personal life ===
After basketball Kenny became an entrepreneur and established multiple businesses where he has been under the mentorship of basketball great, Earvin “Magic” Johnson. Currently, Kenny is the president and CEO of T3 Productions LLC, a versatile multi-faceted company that engages in various business ventures including, but not limited to television and film production, sports entertainment and management, real estate development, and the PPE industry. Given his tenure in the basketball industry from high school to college and 11 years in the NBA, Kenny is also a strong proponent in the push for name, image, and likeness availability and opportunities for college and pro athletes. As a University of New Mexico alum (“UNM”), Kenny enjoys rooting on their sports teams and is still recognized as one of the most celebrated athletes to ever play at UNM. He was known to attend Lobos Men's basketball games He is an avid golfer and plays in many charitable and private tournaments throughout each year in New Mexico. Kenny has two children and currently resides in Albuquerque, NM.

=== Basketball tournaments and camps ===
Kenny hosts multiple basketball tournaments and camps throughout the year in both New Mexico and California. He is also a member of the AAU basketball circuit.

=== Charitable work ===
Kenny is the founder of the Kenny Thomas Foundation dedicated to helping the community youth experiencing financial hardship by providing them with opportunities through higher education, college scholarships, and helping families in need of assistance move from poverty to self-sufficiency. He is also a member of several nonprofit boards including the ALS New Mexico Chapter board, the African American Greater Albuquerque Chamber of Commerce, and The University of New Mexico Black Alumni Chapter.

== NBA career statistics ==
Legend
GP	Games played	GS	Games started	MPG	Minutes per game
FG%	Field goal percentage	3P%	3-point field goal percentage	FT%	Free throw percentage
RPG	Rebounds per game	APG	Assists per game	SPG	Steals per game
BPG	Blocks per game	PPG	Points per game	**Bold**	Career high
*	Led the league

=== Regular season ===
Year	Team	GP	GS	MPG	FG%	3P%	FT%	RPG	APG	SPG	BPG	PPG
1999–00	Houston	72	29	25.0	.399	.262	.660	6.1	1.6	.8	.3	8.3
2000–01	Houston	74	21	24.6	.443	**.272**	.722	5.6	1.0	.5	.6	7.1
2001–02	Houston	72	71	34.5	.478	.000	.664	7.2	1.9	**1.2**	**.9**	14.1
2002–03	Houston	20	14	29.3	.432	.000	.733	6.9	2.0	.8	.3	9.9
2002–03	Philadelphia	46	28	30.3	.482	.000	.750	8.5	1.6	1.0	.5	10.2
2003–04	Philadelphia	74	**72**	**36.5**	.469	.200	.752	**10.1**	1.5	1.1	.4	13.6
2004–05	Philadelphia	47	43	28.6	.456	.250	**.798**	6.6	1.6	.9	.1	11.3
2004–05	Sacramento	26	15	31.7	.492	.000	.722	8.7	**2.9**	1.0	.4	**14.5**
2005–06	Sacramento	**82***	55	28.0	**.505**	.000	.676	7.5	2.0	.9	.5	9.1
2006–07	Sacramento	62	53	22.8	.482	.000	.513	6.1	1.2	.7	.3	5.3
2007–08	Sacramento	23	3	12.2	.421	.000	.000	2.7	.6	.3	.0	1.4
2008–09	Sacramento	8	0	7.8	.375	.000	.000	1.9	.1	.8	.1	.8
2009–10	Sacramento	26	2	12.0	.486	.000	.583	3.3	.6	.4	.4	1.6
Career		632	406	27.4	.465	.244	.699	6.9	1.5	.8	.4	9.3

=== Playoffs ===
Year	Team	GP	GS	MPG	FG%	3P%	FT%	RPG	APG	SPG	BPG	PPG
2003	Philadelphia	**12**	**12**	**32.4**	.535	.000	.655	**9.3**	.9	.7	**.4**	10.6
2005	Sacramento	5	5	30.6	.511	.000	**.700**	8.8	**2.4**	**.8**	**.4**	**12.0**
2006	Sacramento	6	6	24.7	**.542**	.000	.692	4.5	1.3	**.8**	.0	5.8
Career		23	23	30.0	.529	.000	.677	8.0	1.3	.7	.3	9.7
