= Carl Landry =

American basketball player (born 1983)

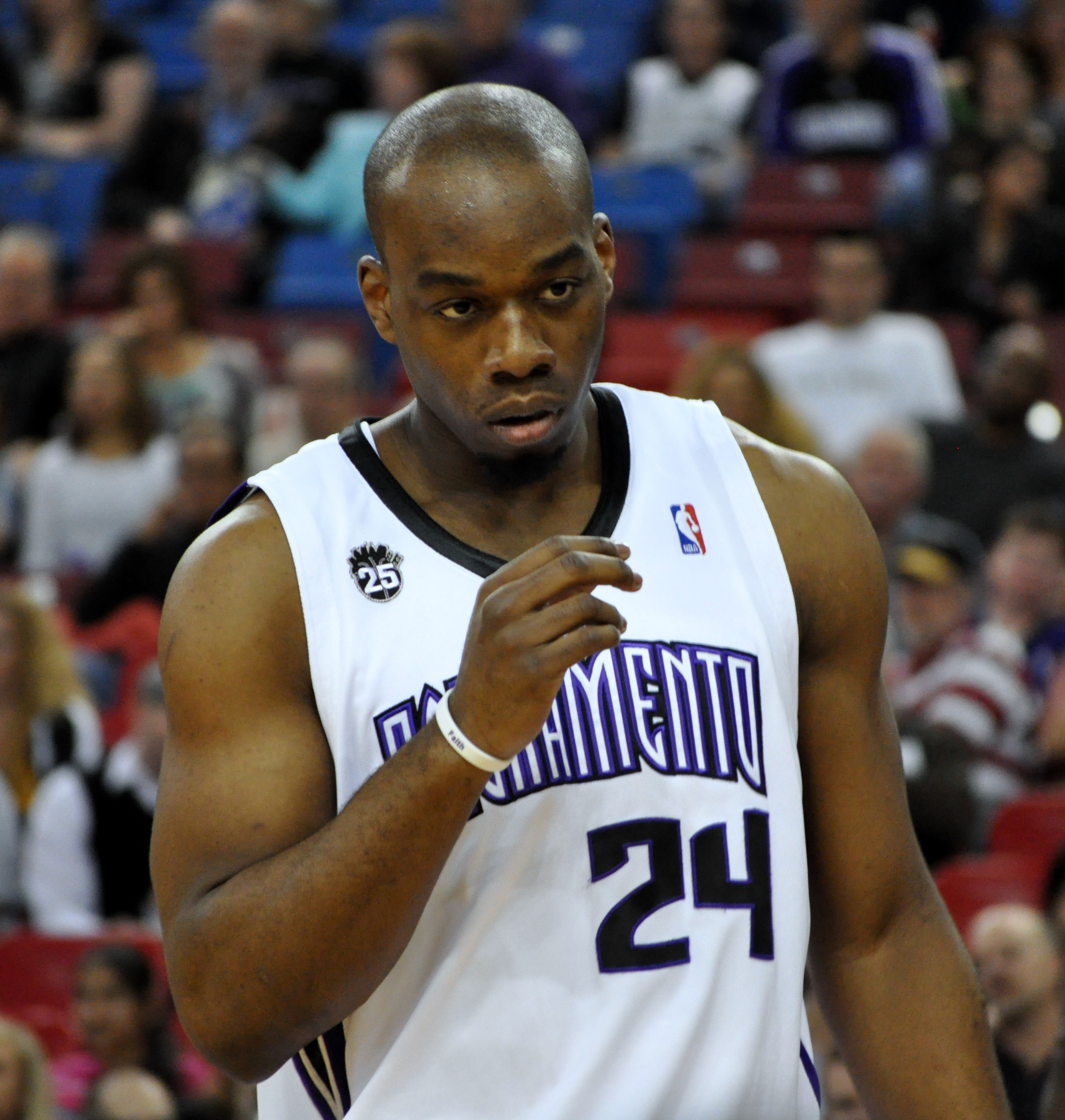
- Landry during his first tenure with the Sacramento Kings in 2010

Personal information
- Born: September 19, 1983 (age 43) Milwaukee, Wisconsin, U.S.
- Listed height: 6 ft 9 in (2.06 m)
- Listed weight: 248 lb (112 kg)

Career information
- High school: Harold S. Vincent (Milwaukee, Wisconsin)
- College: Vincennes (2002–2004); Purdue (2004–2007)
- NBA draft: 2007: 2nd round, 31st overall pick
- Drafted by: Seattle SuperSonics
- Playing career: 2007–2019
- Position: Power forward
- Number: 14, 24, 7

Career history
- 2007–2010: Houston Rockets
- 2010–2011: Sacramento Kings
- 2011–2012: New Orleans Hornets
- 2012–2013: Golden State Warriors
- 2013–2015: Sacramento Kings
- 2015–2016: Philadelphia 76ers
- 2017–2018: Jilin Northeast Tigers
- 2019: Hiroshima Dragonflies

Career highlights
- NBA All-Rookie Second Team (2008); First-team All-Big Ten (2007); Second-team All-Big Ten (2005)

Career NBA statistics
- Points: 5,541 (10.8 ppg)
- Rebounds: 2,533 (4.9 rpg)
- Assists: 355 (0.7 apg)
- Stats at NBA.com
- Stats at Basketball Reference

Carl Christopher Landry (born September 19, 1983) is an American former professional basketball player. The 6-foot-9-inch (2.06 m), all-conference power forward played college basketball for the Purdue Boilermakers from 2004 to 2007. He is the older brother of Marcus Landry.

== High school career ==
Landry attended Harold S. Vincent High School in Milwaukee, Wisconsin where he won the Wisconsin Division I state championship in 2000 and 2001. However, Landry did not have much individual success as a high school player as he was cut from his freshman team, barely made the Vincent High junior varsity team as a sophomore, and didn't see much playing time on varsity as a junior or senior.

== College career ==
=== Vincennes ===
Landry started his college career in 2002–03 at Vincennes University, a junior college located in Vincennes, Indiana where the likes of Shawn Marion and Bob McAdoo also played. He averaged 14.7 points and 7.8 rebounds per game as a freshman, but missed half the season due to a broken hand. As a sophomore in 2003–04, he led the Trailblazers with averages of 19.6 points, 8.9 rebounds and 2.3 blocks per game. He was named a first-team Junior College All-American and the All-Region MVP.

In 2012, he was inducted into the National Junior College Athletic Association (NJCAA) Hall of Fame, joining his Purdue coach (Gene Keady) as a NJCAA Hall of Fame member.

=== Purdue ===
==== 2004–05 ====
Landry transferred to Purdue University, located in West Lafayette, Indiana for his junior year in 2004–05, where he led the conference with 18.2 ppg and led the Boilers with 7.1 rpg. He shot 61.8 percent from the field and averaged 30.3 mpg while playing under head coach Gene Keady. His best game of the season came against Michigan State when he scored a season-high 31 points while shooting 11-of-12 from the floor. On the season, he scored in double figures 22 times and recorded six double-doubles. He was named second-team All Big Ten by conference coaches and media despite missing the season's final three games due to an ACL injury in his right knee.

==== 2005–06 ====
After recovering from the leg injury, Landry returned to play his senior season under first-year head coach, Matt Painter. He recorded a career-high 35 points in the second game of the season against South Alabama before he re-injured his knee three games later against Evansville. He was forced to sit out the rest of the season and earned a medical redshirt to be eligible for the 2006–07 season. After missing three games his junior season and only playing in five his senior season, Landry's absence on the court, along with teammate, David Teague, left Purdue struggling with just 16 wins in the two seasons.

==== 2006–07 ====
As a redshirt senior in 2006–07, Landry led the Boilermakers in both rebounds and points. He began the season with three consecutive Big Ten Player of the Week honors, becoming the only player in Big Ten Conference history to do so. Landry was also one of only two players in the league to rank in the top five for both points and rebounds. Averaging 18.9 points per game, he ranked in the conference's top three with Alando Tucker of Wisconsin and Adam Haluska of Iowa. On March 10, 2007, Landry scored 24 points and made 9-of-16 shots going against Ohio State's Greg Oden in the Big Ten tournament. He led the Boilermakers to the 2007 NCAA tournament, where he recorded 18 points, 10 rebounds and four assists in his last game as a Boilermaker against the eventual champions, Florida, in the second round. Scoring in double figures in 33 of 34 games his senior season, he was awarded first-team All-Big Ten honors.

Landry finished his career as a Boilermaker averaging 18.4 points and 7.1 rebounds per game in three seasons. He currently holds the school's second highest career field goal percentage with 60.2 accuracy, only behind Steve Scheffler's NCAA record of 68.5 percent.

== NBA Draft Combine ==
Bench Press

Carl Landry was also regarded as one of the strongest players in the NBA during his playing career. While showcasing his talents at the NBA Draft Combine he was able to complete around 21 repetitions of the 185 pound bench press

== Professional career ==
=== Houston Rockets (2007–2010) ===
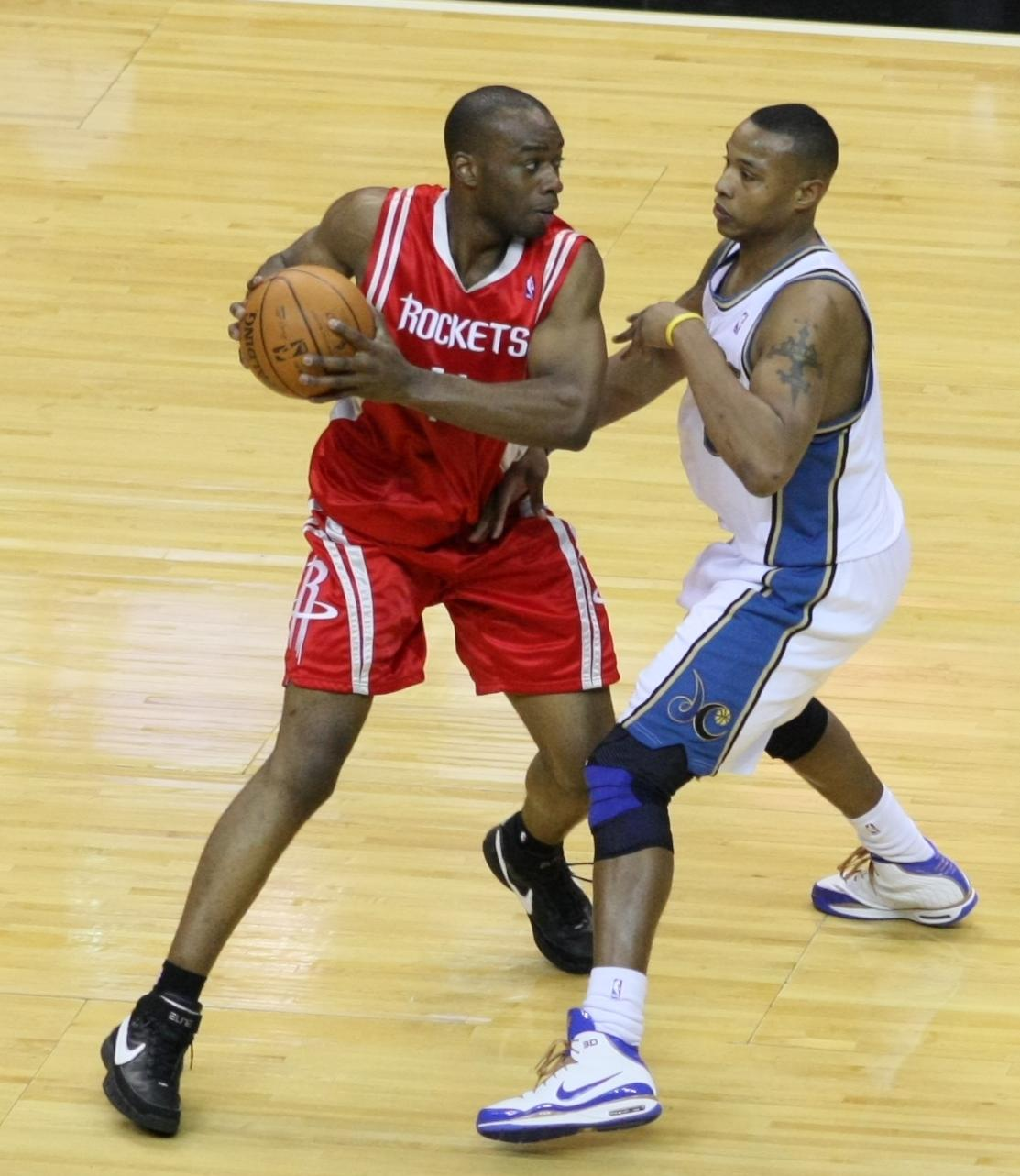
Carl Landry with the Houston Rockets Carl Landry during his 2013 season with the Golden State Warriors.

==== 2007–08 ====
On June 28, 2007, Landry was selected with the 31st overall pick in the 2007 NBA draft behind Kevin Durant who was picked 2nd by the team and Glen Davis at the 35th pick for the team. Landry was later traded to the Houston Rockets on draft night. Landry sat out 33 of the first 36 regular season games of his rookie season before finally getting quality playing time late in the season, as he stepped up for the Rockets with a 63 FG%, while helping fill in for injured NBA All Star teammate, Yao Ming. He became a key role player for the Rockets' 22 game winning streak, the third longest (second longest at the time) in NBA history. He was subsequently named to the NBA All-Rookie second team.

On April 24, 2008, Landry lost a tooth in Game 3 of the 2008 NBA Playoffs against the Utah Jazz. In that same game, he made a last second clutch game-winning block on Deron Williams to seal the much needed win for the Rockets, 94–92.

==== 2008–09 ====
Following his rookie season, Landry became a restricted free agent. However, his contract negotiations with Houston Rockets showed little progress. On September 24, 2008, he received a three-year, $9 million offer sheet from the Charlotte Bobcats. One day later, the Rockets matched the offer. On November 26, 2008, teammate Tracy McGrady sat out of a game against the Indiana Pacers. Landry came off the bench and put up 15 points and grabbed 10 rebounds for a double-double. Another career game for Landry during the 2008–09 season came on January 3, 2009, against the New Jersey Nets, where he led the team in scoring with 18 points by making 5-of-5 shots from the floor and going 8-of-8 from the free throw line. Being the team's sixth man and averaging over 21 minutes per game, he averaged over nine points and five rebounds during the regular season, while leading the Rockets with a .574 field goal percentage.

On May 7, 2009, Landry scored a playoffs career-high of 21 points against the Los Angeles Lakers in Game 2 of their semi-finals match-up. He shot 7-of-9 from the floor and grabbed a team-high 10 rebounds. Landry scored only 4 points in 22 minutes, shooting 2-of-10 from the field in his last game. He averaged 7.5 points and 3.9 rebounds per game while leading the Rockets in shooting with .557 percent from the field in 13 games during the 2009 Playoffs against the Portland Trail Blazers and the Los Angeles Lakers.

===== Shooting incident =====
On March 17, 2009, at 2:30 am, Landry was involved in an incident in downtown Houston when his car was struck by a vehicle that swerved to hit him. They both collided a second time as they made U-turns. As Landry exited his vehicle to assess the damage, he was shot in the leg and the suspects fled the scene. On March 30, Landry returned to practice involvement and played in his first game on April 7, less than three weeks after the shooting.

==== 2009–10 ====
In his third season with the Rockets, Landry received significant minutes with the absence of center Yao Ming, who sat out while recovering from an injury. On December 18, 2009, Landry lost 3 teeth in a collision with Dirk Nowitzki while attempting to force a charge in a game on the road against the Dallas Mavericks. Fragments of his teeth were injected into Dirk's elbow. He scored a career-high 31 points against the Phoenix Suns on January 6. In the 52 games in which he appeared in for the Rockets on the season, he averaged 16.1 points and 5.5 rebounds while shooting .839 percent from the line.

=== Sacramento Kings (2010–2011) ===
On February 18, 2010, Landry was traded to the Sacramento Kings in a three-team deal that also moved Tracy McGrady to the Knicks and Kevin Martin to the Rockets. The fourth Purdue alum to play for the Kings, he debuted in a starting role. In his first game against his former Rockets on March 3, 2010, he recorded a double-double with 21 points and 10 rebounds in a win. He wrapped up his third NBA season starting in each of the 28 games in which he appeared in with the Kings. During that stretch, he averaged 18.0 points, 6.5 rebounds and 1.0 steals per game, but did not appear in the playoffs for the first time in his career.

On April 14, 2010, the Kings exercised the team option on Landry's contract for 2010–11.

=== New Orleans Hornets (2011–2012) ===
On February 23, 2011, Landry was traded to the New Orleans Hornets for Marcus Thornton and cash considerations. On April 17, 2011, Landry scored 17 points in a 109–100 win over the Lakers in Game 1 of the 2011 NBA playoffs.

On December 17, 2011, Landry re-signed with the Hornets to a one-year, $9 million contract.

=== Golden State Warriors (2012–2013) ===
On August 1, 2012, Landry signed with the Golden State Warriors. As the team's back-up power forward in 2012–13, Landry averaged 6.0 rebounds per game on the season, while also averaging 10.8 points per game. On June 26, 2013, Carl Landry decided to leave the Golden State Warriors, and opt out of his contract. It was a two-year deal that was worth $8 million. Landry's agent Mark Bartelstein explained that leaving the Warriors was a good investment since Landry had just finished a great season, which could potentially open up his value to other teams and land him a better paying deal.

=== Return to Sacramento (2013–2015) ===
On July 15, 2013, Landry signed a multi-year deal with the Sacramento Kings. He missed the first three months of the 2013–14 season after hip surgery.

On March 8, 2014, it was announced that Landry had suffered a meniscus tear in his right knee that required surgery, forcing him to miss the rest of the season. He managed just 18 games (one start) on the season while averaging 4.2 points and 3.2 rebounds in 12.9 minutes per game.

During his 2013–2014 season with the Sacramento Kings, Landry averaged his career low in points. This season also saw a career low on blocks per game for Landry and he would only go on to average 0.1 blocks a game. Carl Landry also had an all-time low in assists this season averaging only 0.3 a game. During this season Carl Landry did not play for 64 of the seasons 82 games.

=== Philadelphia 76ers (2015–2016) ===
On July 10, 2015, Landry was traded to the Philadelphia 76ers along with Nik Stauskas, Jason Thompson, a future first-round pick, and the rights to swap first-round picks in 2016 and 2017, in exchange for the rights to Artūras Gudaitis and Luka Mitrović. On December 8, he was assigned to the Delaware 87ers of the NBA Development League to rehabilitate a right wrist injury. He was recalled on December 23 and made his debut for the 76ers that night, recording 10 points and 5 rebounds in a loss to the Milwaukee Bucks. On March 20, 2016, he scored a season-high 26 points in a loss to the Boston Celtics. On August 31, 2016, he was waived by the 76ers.

=== Jilin Northeast Tigers (2017–2018) ===
On August 31, 2017, Landry signed with the Jilin Northeast Tigers of the Chinese Basketball Association.

== NBA career statistics ==
Legend
GP	Games played	GS	Games started	MPG	Minutes per game
FG%	Field goal percentage	3P%	3-point field goal percentage	FT%	Free throw percentage
RPG	Rebounds per game	APG	Assists per game	SPG	Steals per game
BPG	Blocks per game	PPG	Points per game	**Bold**	Career high

=== Regular season ===
Year	Team	GP	GS	MPG	FG%	3P%	FT%	RPG	APG	SPG	BPG	PPG
2007–08	Houston	42	0	16.9	**.616**	.000	.661	4.9	.5	.4	.2	9.9
2008–09	Houston	69	0	21.3	.574	.333	.813	5.0	.6	.4	.4	9.2
2009–10	Houston	52	1	27.2	.547	.000	**.839**	5.5	.8	.5	**.9**	16.1
2009–10	Sacramento	28	**28**	**37.6**	.520	.333	.741	**6.5**	**.9**	**1.0**	.6	**18.0**
2010–11	Sacramento	53	16	26.5	.492	.000	.721	4.8	**.9**	.6	.4	11.9
2010–11	New Orleans	23	10	26.2	.527	.000	.795	4.1	.6	.4	.5	11.8
2011–12	New Orleans	41	8	24.4	.503	.000	.799	5.2	**.9**	.3	.3	12.5
2012–13	Golden State	**81**	2	23.2	.540	.333	.817	6.0	.8	.4	.4	10.8
2013–14	Sacramento	18	1	12.9	.517	.000	.824	3.2	.3	.2	.1	4.2
2014–15	Sacramento	70	15	17.0	.515	.000	.820	3.8	.4	.2	.2	7.2
2015–16	Philadelphia	36	12	15.8	.556	**.462**	.736	4.1	**.9**	.3	.3	9.8
Career		513	93	22.5	.535	.300	.785	4.9	.7	.4	.4	10.8

=== Playoffs ===
Year	Team	GP	GS	MPG	FG%	3P%	FT%	RPG	APG	SPG	BPG	PPG
2008	Houston	6	0	17.7	.423	.000	.750	4.7	.0	**1.2**	**.5**	5.7
2009	Houston	**13**	0	18.5	**.557**	.000	.576	3.9	.2	.3	.4	7.5
2011	New Orleans	6	**6**	**35.5**	.456	.000	**.917**	5.0	1.0	.7	**.5**	**15.8**
2013	Golden State	12	3	20.5	.520	.000	.731	**5.2**	**1.4**	.6	.2	11.8
Career		37	9	21.8	.504	.000	.745	4.6	.7	.6	.4	9.9
