= 2009–10 Sacramento Kings season =

NBA professional basketball team season

- Head coach: Paul Westphal
- General manager: Geoff Petrie
- Owners: Maloof family
- Arena: ARCO Arena

Results
- Record: 25–57 (.305)
- Place: Division: 5th (Pacific); Conference: 14th (Western)
- Playoff finish: Did not qualify
- Stats at Basketball Reference

Local media
- Television: CSN California, KXTV
- Radio: KHTK

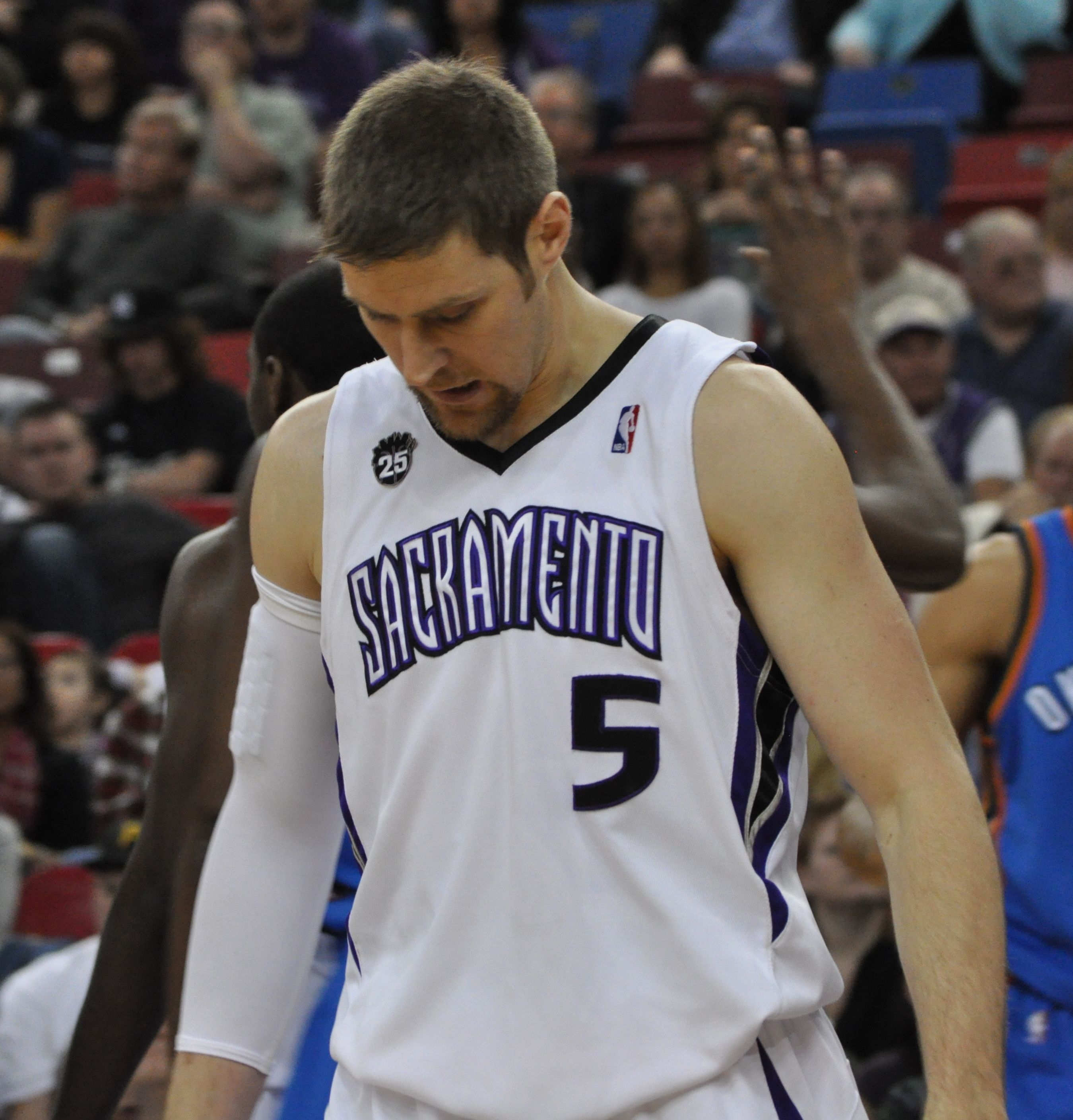
Sacramento King's player Andrés Nocioni.

The 2009–10 Sacramento Kings season was the 65th season of the franchise, and its 61st season in the National Basketball Association (NBA). The Kings missed the playoffs for the fourth straight year.

== Key dates ==
- June 25 – The 2009 NBA draft took place in New York City.
- July 8 – The free agency period started.

== Roster ==
2009–10 Sacramento Kings roster
Players

Pos.	No.	Player	Height	Weight	DOB	From
F	40	Jon Brockman	6 ft 7 in (2.01 m)	255 lb (116 kg)		Washington
F	18	Omri Casspi	6 ft 9 in (2.06 m)	211 lb (96 kg)		Israel
G	13	Tyreke Evans	6 ft 6 in (1.98 m)	220 lb (100 kg)		Memphis
G/F	32	Francisco García	6 ft 7 in (2.01 m)	195 lb (88 kg)		Louisville
G/F	20	Donté Greene	6 ft 11 in (2.11 m)	226 lb (103 kg)		Syracuse
C	31	Spencer Hawes (injured) (IN)	7 ft 1 in (2.16 m)	245 lb (111 kg)		Washington
F	24	Carl Landry	6 ft 9 in (2.06 m)	248 lb (112 kg)		Purdue
F	42	Sean May	6 ft 9 in (2.06 m)	266 lb (121 kg)		North Carolina
F	7	Dominic McGuire (injured)	6 ft 8 in (2.03 m)	220 lb (100 kg)		Fresno State
F	5	Andrés Nocioni	6 ft 7 in (2.01 m)	225 lb (102 kg)		Argentina
F/C	34	Jason Thompson	6 ft 11 in (2.11 m)	250 lb (113 kg)		Rider
G/F	3	Ime Udoka	6 ft 5 in (1.96 m)	220 lb (100 kg)		Portland State
G	19	Beno Udrih	6 ft 3 in (1.91 m)	205 lb (93 kg)		Slovenia

Coaches
Head coach
- Paul Westphal (USC)
Assistant(s)
- Jim Eyen (UC Santa Barbara)
- Mario Elie (American International)
- Truck Robinson (Tennessee State)
- Shareef Abdur-Rahim (California)
- Pete Carril (Lafayette)
- Bryan Gates (Boise State)

Legend
- (DP) Unsigned draft pick
- (FA) Free agent
- (S) Suspended
- Injured

== Pre-season ==
2009 Pre-season game log: 2–5–0 (Home: 1–2–0; Road: 1–3–0)
#	Date	Visitor	Score	Home	OT	Attendance	Record	Recap
1	October 6	Sacramento Kings	86–98	Portland Trail Blazers	0	17,682	0–1
2	October 7	Portland Trail Blazers	89–86	Sacramento Kings	0	10,454	0–2
3	October 15	Sacramento Kings	88–92	Los Angeles Lakers	0	14,741	0–3
4	October 17	Golden State Warriors	94–101	Sacramento Kings	0	11,009	1–3
5	October 20	Sacramento Kings	127–143	Phoenix Suns	0	13,177	1–4
6	October 22	Sacramento Kings	104–89	Oklahoma City Thunder	0	16,014	2–4
7	October 23	Utah Jazz	95–85	Sacramento Kings	0	11,104	2–5

== Regular season ==
=== Standings ===
Pacific Division	W	L	PCT	GB	Home	Road	Div
c-Los Angeles Lakers	57	25	.695	–	34–7	23–18	13–3
x-Phoenix Suns	54	28	.659	3	32–9	22–19	12–4
Los Angeles Clippers	29	53	.354	28	21–20	8–33	5–11
Golden State Warriors	26	56	.317	31	18–23	8–33	5–11
Sacramento Kings	25	57	.305	32	18–23	7–34	5–11

#	Western Conference				
#	Team	W	L	PCT	GB
1	c-Los Angeles Lakers	57	25	.695	–
2	y-Dallas Mavericks	55	27	.671	2
3	x-Phoenix Suns	54	28	.659	3
4	y-Denver Nuggets	53	29	.646	4
5	x-Utah Jazz	53	29	.646	4
6	x-Portland Trail Blazers	50	32	.610	7
7	x-San Antonio Spurs	50	32	.610	7
8	x-Oklahoma City Thunder	50	32	.610	7
9	Houston Rockets	42	40	.512	15
10	Memphis Grizzlies	40	42	.488	17
11	New Orleans Hornets	37	45	.451	20
12	Los Angeles Clippers	29	53	.354	28
13	Golden State Warriors	26	56	.317	31
14	Sacramento Kings	25	57	.305	32
15	Minnesota Timberwolves	15	67	.183	42

=== Game log ===
2009–10 game log
October: 0–3 (home: 0–0; road: 0–3)

Game	Date	Team	Score	High points	High rebounds	High assists	Location Attendance	Record
1	October 28	@ Oklahoma City	L 89–102	Kevin Martin (27)	Jason Thompson (9)	Kevin Martin (4)	Ford Center; 18,203	0–1
2	October 30	@ New Orleans	L 92–97	Tyreke Evans (22)	Jason Thompson (12)	Jason Thompson (6)	New Orleans Arena; 17,306	0–2
3	October 31	@ San Antonio	L 94–113	Kevin Martin (29)	Spencer Hawes (10)	Tyreke Evans (6)	AT&T Center; 16,966	0–3

November: 8–5 (home: 7–2; road: 1–3)

Game	Date	Team	Score	High points	High rebounds	High assists	Location Attendance	Record
4	November 2	Memphis	W 127–116 (OT)	Kevin Martin (48)	Spencer Hawes (11)	Spencer Hawes (7)	ARCO Arena; 17,317	1–3
5	November 4	Atlanta	L 103–115	Kevin Martin (29)	Jason Thompson (12)	Jason Thompson (5)	ARCO Arena; 11,751	1–4
6	November 7	@ Utah	W 104–99	Tyreke Evans (32)	Jason Thompson (11)	Tyreke Evans (7)	EnergySolutions Arena; 18,825	2–4
7	November 8	Golden State	W 120–107	Tyreke Evans (23)	Jason Thompson, Omri Casspi (10)	Beno Udrih (6)	ARCO Arena; 10,760	3–4
8	November 10	Oklahoma City	W 101–98	Jason Thompson (21)	Jason Thompson (14)	Tyreke Evans (8)	ARCO Arena; 10,523	4-4
9	November 13	Houston	W 109–100	Jason Thompson (27)	Jason Thompson (11)	Tyreke Evans, Beno Udrih (4)	ARCO Arena; 11,762	5–4
10	November 17	Chicago	L 87–101	Donté Greene (24)	Jason Thompson (9)	Beno Udrih, Sergio Rodríguez (5)	ARCO Arena; 12,364	5-5
11	November 20	@ Dallas	L 102–104	Tyreke Evans (29)	Jason Thompson (8)	Tyreke Evans (10)	American Airlines Center; 19,871	5–6
12	November 21	@ Houston	L 106–113	Spencer Hawes (24)	Spencer Hawes, Andrés Nocioni (9)	Beno Udrih (8)	Toyota Center; 16,202	5–7
13	November 23	@ Memphis	L 105–116	Tyreke Evans (28)	Jason Thompson (10)	Sergio Rodríguez (10)	FedEx Forum; 10,109	5–8
14	November 25	NY Knicks	W 111–97	Donté Greene (24)	Tyreke Evans (11)	Tyreke Evans (7)	ARCO Arena; 11,375	6–8
15	November 27	New Jersey	W 109–96	Tyreke Evans, Beno Udrih (21)	Spencer Hawes (10)	Beno Udrih (5)	ARCO Arena; 12,725	7–8
16	November 29	New Orleans	W 112–96	Sergio Rodríguez (24)	Jason Thompson (14)	Sergio Rodríguez (5)	ARCO Arena; 11,548	8–8

December: 6–9 (home: 4–4; road: 2–5)

Game	Date	Team	Score	High points	High rebounds	High assists	Location Attendance	Record
17	December 2	Indiana	W 110–105	Tyreke Evans (26)	Spencer Hawes (7)	Tyreke Evans (6)	ARCO Arena; 10,021	9–8
18	December 5	@ Phoenix	L 107–115	Tyreke Evans (21)	Kenny Thomas (18)	Tyreke Evans (7)	US Airways Center; 17,747	9-9
19	December 6	Miami	L 102–115	Tyreke Evans (30)	Jason Thompson (8)	Tyreke Evans, Jason Thompson (4)	ARCO Arena; 13,186	9–10
20	December 8	@ New Orleans	L 94–96	Tyreke Evans (25)	Jason Thompson (9)	Tyreke Evans (9)	New Orleans Arena; 13,140	9–11
21	December 9	@ San Antonio	L 106–118	Omri Casspi (20)	Jason Thompson (9)	Beno Udrih (6)	AT&T Center; 17,353	9–12
22	December 12	Minnesota	W 120–100	Jason Thompson (23)	Jason Thompson (12)	Sergio Rodríguez (9)	ARCO Arena; 11,333	10–12
23	December 15	@ Portland	L 88–95	Tyreke Evans (19)	Jason Thompson (9)	Beno Udrih (5)	Rose Garden; 20,588	10–13
24	December 16	Washington	W 112–109	Tyreke Evans (26)	Jason Thompson (13)	Tyreke Evans (6)	ARCO Arena; 16,579	11–13
25	December 18	@ Minnesota	L 96–116	Omri Casspi (21)	Jason Thompson	Tyreke Evans (8)	Target Center; 13,144	11–14
26	December 19	@ Milwaukee	W 96–95	Tyreke Evans (24)	Jason Thompson (10)	Jason Thompson (4)	Bradley Center; 13,745	12–14
27	December 21	@ Chicago	W 102–98	Tyreke Evans (23)	Tyreke Evans (8)	Sergio Rodríguez (7)	United Center; 19,631	13–14
28	December 23	Cleveland	L 104–117	Tyreke Evans (28)	Spencer Hawes (12)	Tyreke Evans (5)	ARCO Arena; 16,407	13–15
29	December 26	LA Lakers	L 103–112	Beno Udrih (23)	Omri Casspi (10)	Spencer Hawes (7)	ARCO Arena; 17,345	13–16
30	December 28	Denver	W 106–101	Andrés Nocioni (21)	Jason Thompson (11)	Beno Udrih (7)	ARCO Arena; 14,548	14–16
31	December 30	Philadelphia	L 106–116	Donté Greene, Omri Casspi (21)	Jason Thompson (11)	Spencer Hawes, Sergio Rodríguez (5)	ARCO Arena; 13,156	14–17

January: 2–13 (home: 2–4; road: 0–9)

Game	Date	Team	Score	High points	High rebounds	High assists	Location Attendance	Record
32	January 1	@ LA Lakers	L 108–109	Spencer Hawes (30)	Spencer Hawes (11)	Beno Udrih (13)	Staples Center; 18,997	14–18
33	January 2	Dallas	L 91–99	Omri Casspi (22)	Omri Casspi (11)	Tyreke Evans (6)	ARCO Arena; 14,294	14–19
34	January 5	Phoenix	L 109–113	Tyreke Evans (23)	Tyreke Evans (11)	Tyreke Evans (7)	ARCO Arena; 13,630	14–20
35	January 8	@ Golden State	L 101–108	Tyreke Evans (25)	Ime Udoka (14)	Tyreke Evans, Jason Thompson (6)	Oracle Arena; 18,327	14–21
36	January 9	Denver	W 102–100	Tyreke Evans (27)	Jon Brockman (12)	Tyreke Evans (5)	ARCO Arena; 14,411	15–21
37	January 12	Orlando	L 88–109	Tyreke Evans (18)	Omri Casspi (11)	Omri Casspi (5)	ARCO Arena; 14,426	15–22
38	January 15	@ Philadelphia	L 86–98	Kevin Martin, Jason Thompson (19)	Jason Thompson (16)	Jason Thompson (5)	Wachovia Center; 16,767	15–23
39	January 16	@ Washington	L 86–96	Kevin Martin (23)	Spencer Hawes (7)	Tyreke Evans (7)	Verizon Center; 17,242	15–24
40	January 18	@ Charlotte	L 103–105	Tyreke Evans (34)	Jon Brockman (14)	Tyreke Evans (7)	Time Warner Cable Arena; 13,678	15–25
41	January 20	@ Atlanta	L 97–108	Tyreke Evans (24)	Omri Casspi (8)	Beno Udrih (8)	Philips Arena; 14,809	15–26
42	January 22	@ Orlando	L 84–100	Tyreke Evans (19)	Jason Thompson (10)	Kevin Martin, Sergio Rodríguez (5)	Amway Arena; 17,461	15–27
43	January 23	@ Miami	L 84–115	Tyreke Evans (15)	Jason Thompson, Spencer Hawes (7)	Kevin Martin, Tyreke Evans (3)	American Airlines Arena; 18,521	15–28
44	January 26	Golden State	W 99–96	Beno Udrih (24)	Spencer Hawes (13)	Beno Udrih (5)	ARCO Arena; 14,522	16–28
45	January 29	@ Utah	L 94–101	Kevin Martin (33)	Spencer Hawes (9)	Tyreke Evans (6)	EnergySolutions Arena; 19,480	16–29
46	January 30	Charlotte	L 96–103	Kevin Martin (31)	Jason Thompson (16)	Tyreke Evans (7)	ARCO Arena; 14,186	16–30

February: 4–9 (home: 2–4; road: 2–5)

Game	Date	Team	Score	High points	High rebounds	High assists	Location Attendance	Record
47	February 1	@ Denver	L 109–112	Spencer Hawes (23)	Jon Brockman (11)	Kenyon Martin; Sergio Rodríguez (6)	Pepsi Center; 15544	16–31
48	February 3	San Antonio	L 113–115	Tyreke Evans (32)	Tyreke Evans (7)	Tyreke Evans (8)	ARCO Arena; 12934	16–32
49	February 5	Phoenix	L 102–114	Donté Greene (31)	Omri Casspi (8)	Tyreke Evans (4)	ARCO Arena; 14922	16–33
50	February 7	@ Toronto	L 104–115	Kenyon Martin (24)	Spencer Hawes (11)	Tyreke Evans (9)	Air Canada Centre; 18007	16–34
51	February 9	@ NY Knicks	W 118–114	Tyreke Evans (27)	Jason Thompson (11)	Tyreke Evans (7)	Madison Square Garden; 19531	17–34
52	February 10	@ Detroit	W 103–97	Kenyon Martin (26)	Spencer Hawes (11)	Tyreke Evans; Beno Udrih (6)	Palace of Auburn Hills; 14152	18–34
53	February 16	Boston	L 92–95	Omri Casspi (19)	Tyreke Evans; Jason Thompson (11)	Tyreke Evans (7)	ARCO Arena; 14439	18–35
54	February 17	@ Golden State	L 98–130	Tyreke Evans; Jason Thompson (17)	Jason Thompson (15)	Tyreke Evans (10)	Oracle Arena; 17023	18–36
55	February 20	@ LA Clippers	L 89–99	Tyreke Evans (21)	Carl Landry (8)	Tyreke Evans; Beno Udrih (4)	Staples Center; 17903	18–37
56	February 21	@ Phoenix	L 88–104	Carl Landry (18)	Jason Thompson (9)	Tyreke Evans (6)	U.S. Airways Center; 17369	18–38
57	February 23	Detroit	L 89–101	Tyreke Evans (28)	Jason Thompson (8)	Tyreke Evans (13)	ARCO Arena; 11557	18–39
58	February 26	Utah	W 103–99	Beno Udrih (25)	Spencer Hawes (12)	Tyreke Evans (7)	ARCO Arena; 12938	19–39
59	February 28	LA Clippers	W 97–92	Tyreke Evans (22)	Spencer Hawes (9)	Beno Udrih (6)	ARCO Arena; 13071	20–39

March: 4–13 (home: 2–5; road: 2–8)

Game	Date	Team	Score	High points	High rebounds	High assists	Location Attendance	Record
60	March 2	@ Oklahoma City	L 107–113	Tyreke Evans (27)	Carl Landry (7)	Tyreke Evans (5)	Ford Center; 17677	20–40
61	March 3	@ Houston	W 84–81	Carl Landry (22)	Spencer Hawes; Carl Landry (10)	Tyreke Evans (5)	Toyota Center; 15651	21–40
62	March 5	@ Dallas	L 100–108	Carl Landry (21)	Spencer Hawes (9)	Tyreke Evans; Beno Udrih (6)	American Airlines Center; 19954	21–41
63	March 7	Oklahoma City	L 102–108	Tyreke Evans (24)	Carl Landry; Jason Thompson (8)	Tyreke Evans (7)	ARCO Arena; 12081	21–42
64	March 9	@ Portland	L 81–88	Tyreke Evans (18)	Spencer Hawes (9)	Tyreke Evans (6)	Rose Garden; 20587	20–43
65	March 10	Toronto	W 113–90	Beno Udrih (24)	Tyreke Evans (10)	Tyreke Evans (10)	ARCO Arena; 13412	22–43
66	March 12	Portland	L 94–110	Carl Landry (18)	Tyreke Evans (10)	Beno Udrih (6)	ARCO Arena; 12110	22–44
67	March 14	Minnesota	W 114–100	Tyreke Evans (29)	Tyreke Evans (9)	Tyreke Evans (11)	ARCO Arena; 10736	23–44
68	March 16	LA Lakers	L 99–106	Tyreke Evans (25)	Tyreke Evans (11)	Tyreke Evans (9)	ARCO Arena; 17361	23–45
69	March 19	Milwaukee	L 108–114	Beno Udrih (26)	Ime Udoka (13)	Beno Udrih (9)	ARCO Arena; 12098	23–46
70	March 21	@ LA Clippers	W 102–89	Carl Landry (24)	Spencer Hawes (10)	Beno Udrih (17)	Staples Center; 17233	24–46
71	March 22	Memphis	L 85–102	Carl Landry (23)	Beno Udrih (7)	Beno Udrih (10)	ARCO Arena; 11497	24–47
72	March 24	@ New Jersey	L 79–103	Beno Udrih (19)	Jason Thompson (11)	Spencer Hawes (6)	IZOD Center; 10068	24–48
73	March 26	@ Boston	L 86–94	Carl Landry (30)	Donté Greene (9)	Beno Udrih (12)	TD Garden; 18624	24–49
74	March 28	@ Cleveland	L 90–97	Andrés Nocioni (21)	Jason Thompson (14)	Beno Udrih (15)	Quicken Loans Arena; 20562	24–50
75	March 30	@ Indiana	L 95–102	Jason Thompson; Beno Udrih (18)	Jason Thompson (11)	Tyreke Evans (10)	Conseco Fieldhouse; 13339	24–51
76	March 31	@ Minnesota	L 99–108	Carl Landry (22)	Carl Landry; Jason Thompson; Tyreke Evans (7)	Tyreke Evans (13)	Target Center; 15582	24–52

April: 1–5 (home: 1–4; road: 0–1)

Game	Date	Team	Score	High points	High rebounds	High assists	Location Attendance	Record
77	April 3	Portland	L 87–98	Beno Udrih (22)	Carl Landry (9)	Tyreke Evans; Beno Udrih (6)	ARCO Arena; 12875	24–53
78	April 6	San Antonio	L 86–95	Tyreke Evans (22)	Tyreke Evans (9)	Tyreke Evans (6)	ARCO Arena; 11732	24–54
79	April 8	LA Clippers	W 116–94	Tyreke Evans (28)	Jason Thompson (15)	Tyreke Evans (7)	ARCO Arena; 11418	25–54
80	April 10	Dallas	L 108–126	Carl Landry (30)	Tyreke Evans (8)	Tyreke Evans (6)	ARCO Arena; 15247	25–55
81	April 12	Houston	L 107–117	Tyreke Evans (24)	Jason Thompson (10)	Beno Udrih (6)	ARCO Arena; 14549	25–56
82	April 13	@ LA Lakers	L 100–106	Beno Udrih (21)	Jason Thompson (16)	Beno Udrih (11)	Staples Center; 18977	25–57

2009–10 season schedule

== Player statistics ==
Legend
GP	Games played	GS	Games started	MPG	Minutes per game
FG%	Field-goal percentage	3P%	3-point field-goal percentage	FT%	Free-throw percentage
RPG	Rebounds per game	APG	Assists per game	SPG	Steals per game
BPG	Blocks per game	PPG	Points per game

=== Regular season ===
Player	GP	GS	MPG	FG%	3P%	FT%	RPG	APG	SPG	BPG	PPG
Hilton Armstrong	6	0	9.3	.333	.	1.000	2.3	.3	.3	.7	1.7
Jon Brockman	52	4	12.6	.534	.	.597	4.1	.4	.3	.1	2.8
Omri Casspi	77	31	25.1	.446	.369	.672	4.5	1.2	.7	.2	10.3
Joey Dorsey	8	0	6.5	.444	.	.400	2.3	.0	.1	.1	1.5
Tyreke Evans	72	72	37.2	.458	.255	.748	5.3	5.8	1.5	.4	20.1
Francisco García	25	4	23.0	.466	.390	.882	2.6	1.8	.4	.8	8.1
Donte Greene	76	50	21.4	.441	.377	.643	3.1	.9	.5	.7	8.5
Spencer Hawes	72	59	26.4	.468	.299	.689	6.1	2.2	.4	1.2	10.0
Carl Landry	28	28	37.6	.520	.333	.741	6.5	.9	1.0	.6	18.0
Kevin Martin	22	21	35.2	.398	.355	.819	4.3	2.6	1.0	.2	19.8
Desmond Mason	5	4	13.2	.417	.	.750	2.6	.4	.2	.2	2.6
Sean May	37	4	8.9	.459	.000	.656	1.9	.5	.3	.2	3.3
Dominic McGuire	10	2	6.7	.333	.	.000	1.8	.3	.1	.1	.8
Andres Nocioni	75	28	19.7	.399	.386	.717	3.0	1.0	.4	.3	8.5
Sergio Rodriguez	39	0	13.3	.463	.357	.694	1.3	3.1	.7	.1	6.0
Garrett Temple	5	0	4.6	.375	.000	1.000	.6	.4	.2	.0	2.2
Kenny Thomas	26	2	12.0	.486	.	.583	3.3	.6	.4	.4	1.6
Jason Thompson	75	58	31.4	.472	.100	.715	8.5	1.7	.5	1.0	12.5
Ime Udoka	69	2	13.7	.378	.286	.737	2.8	.8	.5	.1	3.6
Beno Udrih	79	41	31.4	.493	.377	.837	2.8	4.7	1.1	.1	12.9

== Awards, records and milestones ==
=== Awards ===
==== Week/Month ====
- Tyreke Evans was named Western Conference Rookie of the Month for October–November.
- Tyreke Evans was named Western Conference Rookie of the Month for December.

==== All-Star ====
- Tyreke Evans and Omri Casspi participated in the NBA Rookie Challenge during All-Star Weekend.

==== Season ====
- Tyreke Evans was named the NBA Rookie of the Year.
- Tyreke Evans was named to the NBA All-Rookie First Team.

=== Records ===
- The Kings overcame the second largest deficit in NBA history, beating the Chicago Bulls after being down by thirty-five points earlier in the game.

== Transactions ==
=== Trades ===
January 11, 2010
February 18, 2010
To Sacramento Kings

- Hilton Armstrong
To Sacramento Kings

Larry Hughes (From New York)
Carl Landry (From Houston)
Joey Dorsey (From Houston)
To New Orleans Hornets

- 2016 conditional second-round pick
To New York Knicks

Tracy McGrady (from Houston)
Sergio Rodríguez (from Sacramento)

To Houston Rockets

Kevin Martin (from Sacramento)
Jared Jeffries (from New York)
Jordan Hill (From New York)
Hilton Armstrong (From Sacramento)
2012 protected first-round pick (from New York)
Rights to exchange 2011 first-round picks with New York

=== Free Agency ===
Additions
Player	Date signed	Former team
Sean May	August 3	Charlotte Bobcats
Desmond Mason	September 17	Oklahoma City Thunder
Ime Udoka	November 4	Portland Trail Blazers

Subtractions
Player	Date signed	New Team
Ike Diogu	July 29	New Orleans Hornets
Desmond Mason		
Kenny Thomas		
