= Ben McLemore =

American basketball player (born 1993)

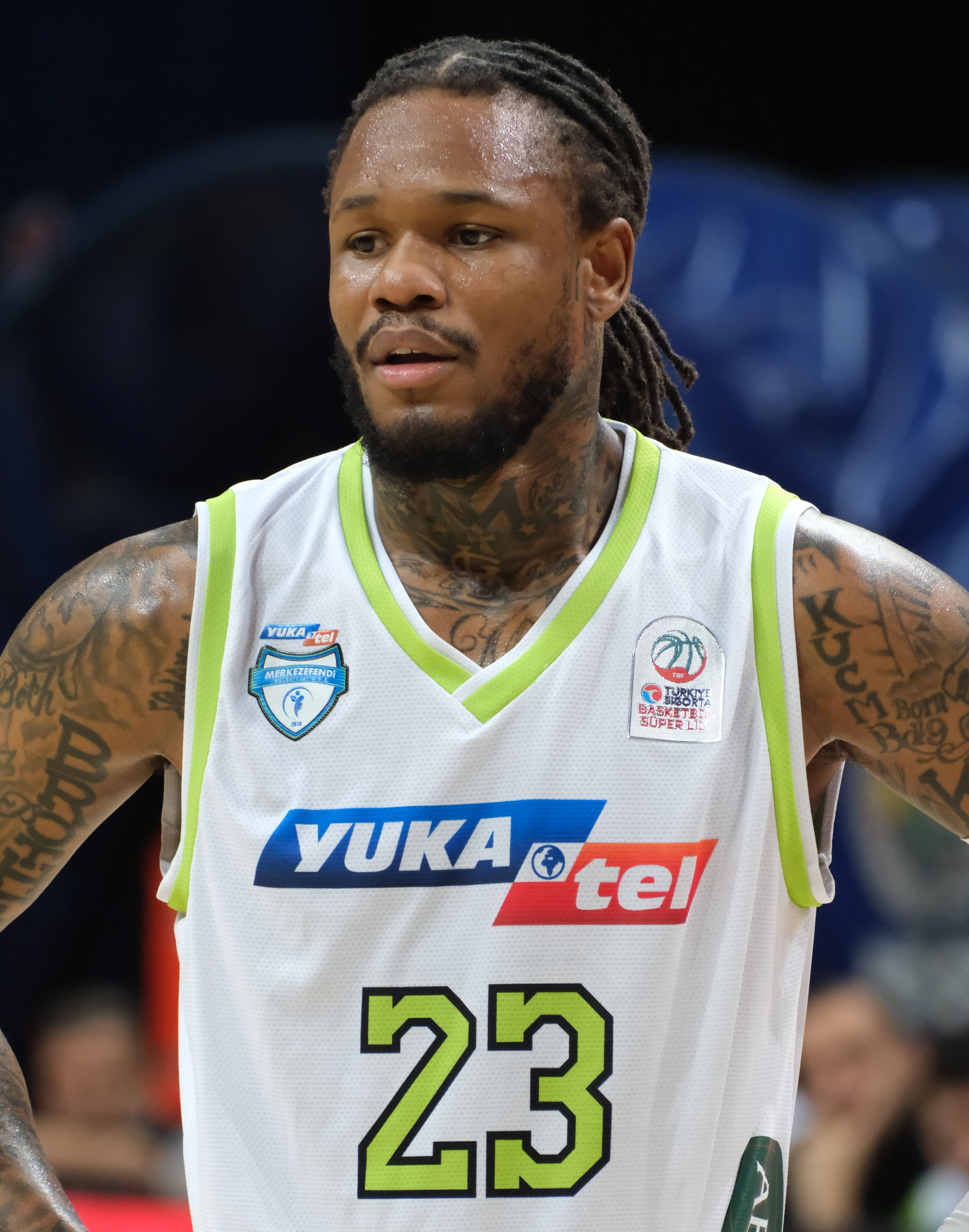
- McLemore with Merkezefendi in 2024

Personal information
- Born: February 11, 1993 (age 33) St. Louis, Missouri, U.S.
- Listed height: 6 ft 3 in (1.91 m)
- Listed weight: 195 lb (88 kg)

Career information
- High school: Wellston (St. Louis, Missouri); Oak Hill Academy (Mouth of Wilson, Virginia); Christian Life Center (Humble, Texas)
- College: Kansas (2012–2013)
- NBA draft: 2013: 1st round, 7th overall pick
- Drafted by: Sacramento Kings
- Playing career: 2013–2025
- Position: Shooting guard
- Number: 16, 23, 7

Career history
- 2013–2017: Sacramento Kings
- 2017–2018: Memphis Grizzlies
- 2017: →Memphis Hustle
- 2018–2019: Sacramento Kings
- 2019–2021: Houston Rockets
- 2021: Los Angeles Lakers
- 2021–2022: Portland Trail Blazers
- 2023: Shandong Hi-Speed Kirin
- 2023: AEK Athens
- 2023–2024: Río Breogán
- 2024–2025: Merkezefendi Belediyesi Denizli

Career highlights
- Consensus second-team All-American (2013); First-team All-Big 12 (2013)
- Stats at NBA.com
- Stats at Basketball Reference

Ben Edward McLemore III (born February 11, 1993) is an American former professional basketball player. He played college basketball for the Kansas Jayhawks and was selected with the seventh overall pick in the 2013 NBA draft by the Sacramento Kings. McLemore played for five teams in the National Basketball Association (NBA) across a nine-year career.

McLemore spent four seasons with the Kings before signing with the Memphis Grizzlies in 2017. He was traded back to the Kings in 2018 and then signed with the Houston Rockets in 2019. McLemore joined the Los Angeles Lakers in 2021 and spent his final NBA stint with the Portland Trail Blazers during the 2021–22 season. McLemore played overseas in China, Greece, Spain and Turkey from 2023 to 2025.

In 2025, McLemore was sentenced to eight years' imprisonment after he was found guilty of raping a woman in Oregon.

== High school career ==
McLemore played high school basketball at Wellston High School in St. Louis, Missouri for three years before his school was shut down in 2010. He then attended both Oak Hill Academy in Mouth of Wilson, Virginia and Christian Life Center in Humble, Texas during his senior year of high school.

Considered a four-star recruit by Rivals.com, McLemore was listed as the No. 9 shooting guard and the No. 34 player in the nation in 2011.

== College career ==
After committing to Kansas, McLemore was deemed ineligible to play by the NCAA because he attended multiple high schools, resulting in his transcripts being "a little fuzzy". He was allowed to practice with the team and take part in team activities starting in the second semester of the school year.

At the beginning of his college career, McLemore was considered to be either a late first-round or early second-round prospect. However, during his first season as a redshirt freshman, McLemore averaged 15.9 points, 5.2 rebounds and 2.0 assists, with 49.5% shooting from the field and 87% shooting from the foul line, and was named a finalist for the John R. Wooden Award.

After declaring for the 2013 NBA draft, allegations arose that NBA agent Rodney Blackstock had given thousands of dollars in impermissible benefits to McLemore's AAU coach, Darius Cobb, in exchange for Cobb steering McLemore toward certain financial advisers and NBA agents. Lending credence to Cobb's allegations, McLemore had Blackstock on his guest pass list for at least three Kansas home games that season, and subsequently signed Blackstock as his NBA agent. This set of facts caused the launch of an NCAA investigation to determine whether or not Kansas would have to vacate the basketball games in which McLemore played.

== Professional career ==
=== Sacramento Kings (2013–2017) ===
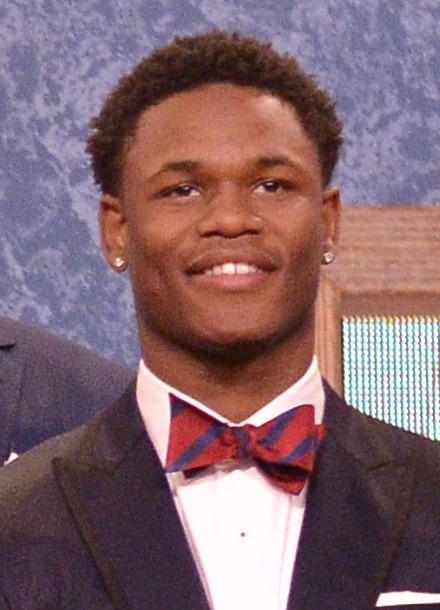
McLemore during the 2013 NBA draft

McLemore was selected with the seventh overall pick by the Sacramento Kings in the 2013 NBA draft. On July 13, 2013, he signed his rookie scale contract with the Kings and joined them for the 2013 NBA Summer League. He was named the Western Conference Rookie of the Month for November 2013.

In February 2014, McLemore was selected to participate in the 2014 Sprite Slam Dunk contest. In the Kings' final game of the regular season on April 16, McLemore scored a season-high 31 points in a loss to the Phoenix Suns. In his rookie season, he played all 82 games (55 starts), averaging 8.8 points, 2.9 rebounds and 1.0 assists in 26.7 minutes per game.

In July 2014, McLemore re-joined the Kings for the 2014 NBA Summer League where he helped them win the Summer League championship while averaging 12.6 points in seven games. On October 19, 2014, the Kings exercised their third-year team option on McLemore's rookie-scale contract, extending the contract through the 2015–16 season. On March 11, 2015, he scored a season-high 27 points in a win over the Charlotte Hornets. He started in all 82 regular season games for the Kings in 2014–15 while averaging 12.1 points, 2.9 rebounds and 1.7 assists in 32.6 minutes per game.

On October 3, 2015, the Kings exercised their fourth-year team option on McLemore's rookie scale contract, extending the contract through the 2016–17 season. On December 5, he had a season-best game with 19 points and 9 rebounds in a loss to the Houston Rockets. On January 28, 2016, he scored a season-high 26 points in a loss to the New Orleans Pelicans. On February 1, McLemore missed his first game of his career due to a sprained right wrist, snapping his consecutive games streak at 211, which was the second-longest in the NBA behind Tristan Thompson (335). He later missed 10 games in March with a finger-tip injury.

On February 10, 2017, McLemore had a season-high 22 points, helped by a career-best six three-pointers, in a 108–107 win over the Atlanta Hawks. On March 29, 2017, he tied a season high with 22 points in a 112–82 loss to the Utah Jazz.

=== Memphis Grizzlies (2017–2018) ===
On July 7, 2017, McLemore signed a multi-year contract with the Memphis Grizzlies. On August 8, 2017, he was ruled out for approximately 12 weeks after fracturing his right foot in a pickup game. On November 2, 2017, McLemore was assigned to the Memphis Hustle of the NBA G League. He was recalled a week later, and made his debut for the Grizzlies on November 11, 2017, recording four points and two rebounds in 18 minutes off the bench in a 111–96 loss to the Houston Rockets. On December 9, 2017, he scored a season-high 17 points in a 102–101 overtime loss to the Oklahoma City Thunder. On January 19, 2018, he set a new season high with 21 points in a 106–88 win over the Sacramento Kings.

=== Return to Sacramento (2018–2019) ===
On July 17, 2018, McLemore was traded, along with Deyonta Davis, a 2021 second-round pick and cash considerations, to the Sacramento Kings in exchange for Garrett Temple. On February 7, 2019, McLemore was waived by the Kings.

=== Houston Rockets (2019–2021) ===
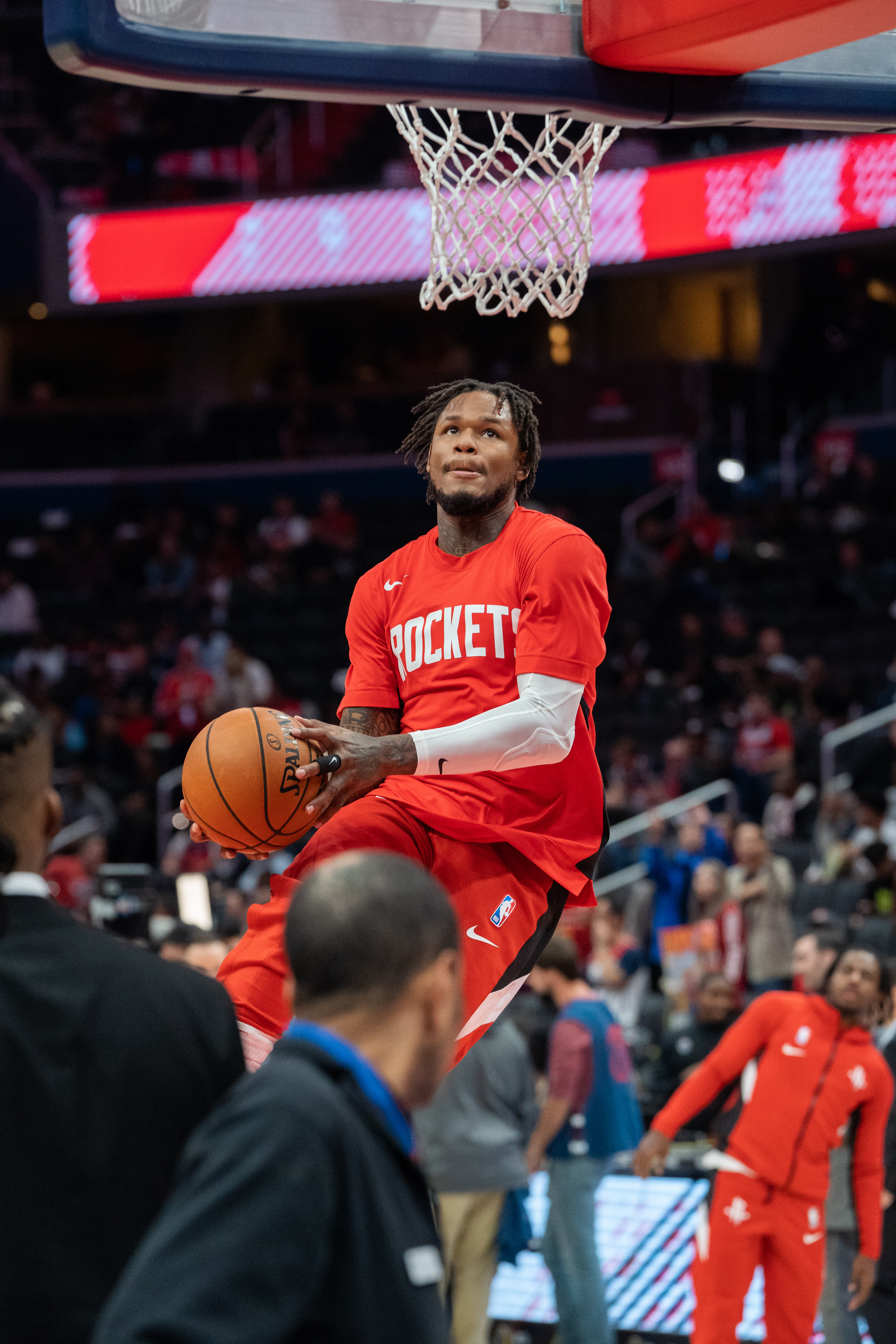
McLemore with the Houston Rockets

On July 23, 2019, McLemore signed with the Houston Rockets.

On December 5, 2019, McLemore led the Rockets in scoring with a season-high 28 points, on top of career-best 8-of-17 shooting from behind the three-point arc in a 119–109 win against the Toronto Raptors. On December 7, 2019, McLemore finished with 27 points on 10-of-15 field goal shooting (5-of-9 from beyond the arc) in a 115–109 win against the Phoenix Suns, which is the first time he has contributed more than 25 points in consecutive games in his career.

On April 3, 2021, the Rockets waived McLemore.

=== Los Angeles Lakers (2021) ===
On April 6, 2021, McLemore signed with the Los Angeles Lakers. On April 8, he made his debut in a loss against the Miami Heat, scoring 6 points off the bench.

=== Portland Trail Blazers (2021–2022) ===
On August 5, 2021, McLemore signed with the Portland Trail Blazers. He made his debut for the team on October 23, scoring six points in a 134–105 win over the Phoenix Suns.

=== Shandong Hi-Speed Kirin (2023) ===
On January 31, 2023, McLemore signed a one-year contract with the Shandong Hi-Speed Kirin of the CBA.

=== AEK Athens (2023) ===
On August 6, 2023, McLemore signed with AEK Athens of the Greek Basket League and the Basketball Champions League, his first European club. His contract was terminated by mutual agreement in December 2023.

=== Río Breogán (2023–2024) ===
On December 22, 2023, McLemore was announced as Club Baloncesto Breogán's new signing for the remainder of the 2023–24 Liga ACB and Basketball Champions League season. He wore number 7 for the Galician club.

=== Yukatel Merkezefendi (2024–2025) ===
On August 22, 2024, he signed with Yukatel Merkezefendi of the Basketbol Süper Ligi (BSL).

== Player profile ==
Before he was drafted, McLemore's size, style of play and abilities had garnered comparisons to former NBA All-Star Ray Allen.

== Career statistics ==
Legend
GP	Games played	GS	Games started	MPG	Minutes per game
FG%	Field goal percentage	3P%	3-point field goal percentage	FT%	Free throw percentage
RPG	Rebounds per game	APG	Assists per game	SPG	Steals per game
BPG	Blocks per game	PPG	Points per game	**Bold**	Career high
*	Led the league

=== NBA ===
==== Regular season ====
Year	Team	GP	GS	MPG	FG%	3P%	FT%	RPG	APG	SPG	BPG	PPG
2013–14	Sacramento	**82**	55	26.7	.376	.320	.804	**2.9**	1.0	.5	.2	8.8
2014–15	Sacramento	**82**	**82***	**32.6**	.437	.358	.813	**2.9**	**1.7**	**.9**	.2	**12.1**
2015–16	Sacramento	68	53	21.2	.429	.362	.718	2.2	1.2	.8	.1	7.8
2016–17	Sacramento	61	26	19.3	.430	.382	.753	2.1	.8	.5	.1	8.1
2017–18	Memphis	56	17	19.5	.421	.346	**.828**	2.5	.9	.7	**.3**	7.5
2018–19	Sacramento	19	0	8.3	.391	**.415**	.667	.9	.2	.3	.1	3.9
2019–20	Houston	71	23	22.8	**.444**	.400	.746	2.2	.8	.6	.2	10.1
2020–21	Houston	32	4	16.8	.357	.331	.719	2.1	.9	.6	.1	7.4
2020–21	L.A. Lakers	21	1	17.5	.390	.368	.762	1.6	.5	.1	.3	8.0
2021–22	Portland	64	6	20.1	.401	.362	.818	1.6	.9	.6	.2	10.2
Career		556	267	22.5	.414	.363	.780	2.3	1.0	.6	.2	9.0

==== Playoffs ====
Year	Team	GP	GS	MPG	FG%	3P%	FT%	RPG	APG	SPG	BPG	PPG
2020	Houston	**11**	0	**11.8**	**.375**	**.389**	—	1.0	**.5**	**.4**	.0	**4.0**
2021	L.A. Lakers	4	0	9.0	.222	.333	—	**1.8**	.3	.3	.0	1.5
Career		15	0	11.1	.347	.381	—	1.2	.5	.3	.0	3.3

=== College ===
Year	Team	GP	GS	MPG	FG%	3P%	FT%	RPG	APG	SPG	BPG	PPG
2012–13	Kansas	37	37	32.2	.495	.420	.870	5.2	2.0	1.0	.7	15.9

== Personal life ==
McLemore was raised by his mother, Sonya Reid, in Wellston, Missouri, alongside his five siblings. In 2009, his older brother, Keith Scott, was sentenced to 15 years' imprisonment for charges including burglary and assault. McLemore's younger brother, Kevin, died in 2018.

On July 4, 2015, Wellston Avenue, the street on which McLemore grew up, was renamed Ben McLemore III Place in his honor.

McLemore was previously married. In March 2017, McLemore's first child, Teagan, was born.

In March 2024, McLemore was involved in a drunken driving incident in Lugo, Spain.

=== Rape conviction ===
On April 9, 2024, McLemore was arrested by Clackamas County Sheriff's Office in Oregon on charges of first-degree rape, first-degree unlawful sexual penetration and two counts of second-degree sexual abuse. The charges stemmed from a party that took place at the home of then-Trail Blazers teammate Robert Covington in Lake Oswego on the night of October 3, 2021. A 21-year-old woman at the party became incapacitated after a night of heavy drinking and awoke in the morning to McLemore raping her on a couch.

The victim reported the crime to police on the same day of the incident. Police collected available evidence and the criminal investigation was assigned to detectives. McLemore's departure from Oregon and his frequent overseas travel due to his career caused delays in the investigation. In February 2024, evidence was presented to a Clackamas County Grand Jury including testimony from the victim and an arrest warrant was subsequently issued for McLemore.

On July 3, 2025, McLemore was found guilty of first-degree rape, first-degree unlawful sexual penetration and one count of second-degree sexual abuse by a jury after a 16-day trial. He was found not guilty of an additional count of second-degree sexual abuse. On July 9, McLemore was sentenced to eight years in Oregon state prison.
