= Tyreke Evans =

American basketball player (born 1989)

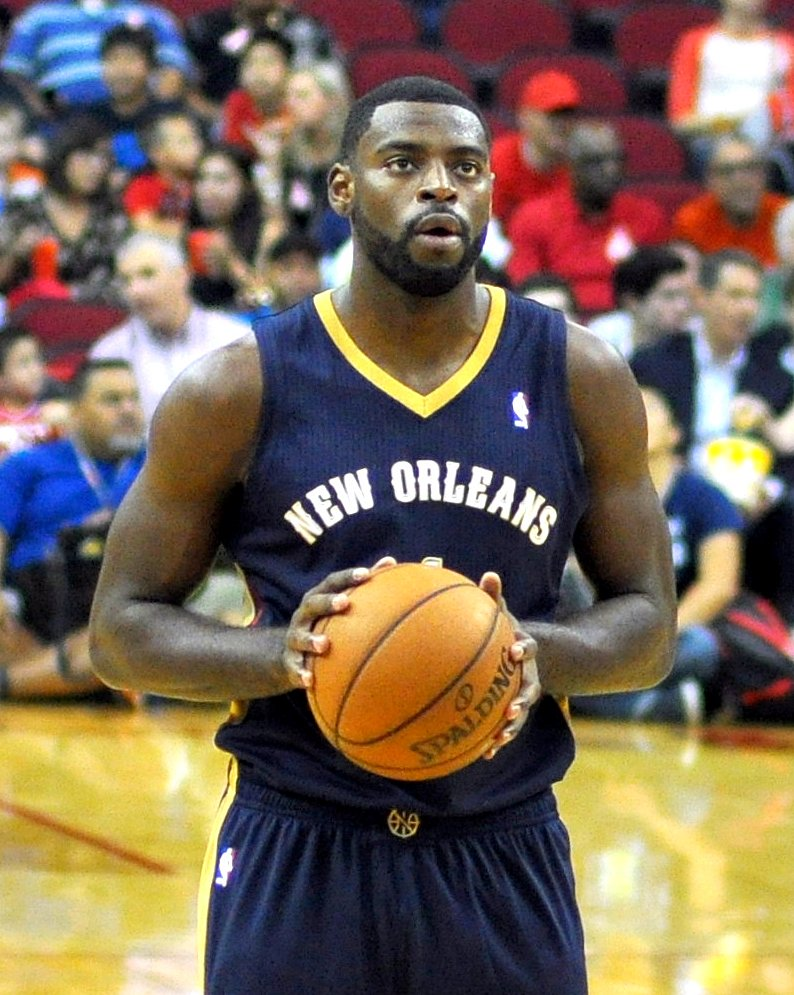
- Evans with the New Orleans Pelicans in 2013

Personal information
- Born: September 19, 1989 (age 37) Chester, Pennsylvania, U.S.
- Listed height: 6 ft 6 in (1.98 m)
- Listed weight: 220 lb (100 kg)

Career information
- High school: American Christian Academy (Aston, Pennsylvania)
- College: Memphis (2008–2009)
- NBA draft: 2009: 1st round, 4th overall pick
- Drafted by: Sacramento Kings
- Playing career: 2009–2019; 2022–2023
- Position: Small forward / shooting guard
- Number: 13, 1, 32, 12

Career history
- 2009–2013: Sacramento Kings
- 2013–2017: New Orleans Pelicans
- 2017: Sacramento Kings
- 2017–2018: Memphis Grizzlies
- 2018–2019: Indiana Pacers
- 2022: Wisconsin Herd
- 2022–2023: Indios de Mayagüez
- 2023: Broncos de Caracas

Career highlights
- NBA Rookie of the Year (2010); NBA All-Rookie First Team (2010); USBWA National Freshman of the Year (2009); First-team All-Conference USA (2009); Conference USA Freshman of the Year (2009); Conference USA tournament MVP (2009); McDonald's All-American Game MVP (2008); First-team Parade All-American (2008); Fourth-team Parade All-American (2007)
- Stats at NBA.com
- Stats at Basketball Reference

Tyreke Jamir Evans (born September 19, 1989) is an American former professional basketball player. After playing college basketball for the Memphis Tigers, he was selected with the fourth overall pick in the 2009 NBA draft by the Sacramento Kings. Evans went on to win the 2010 NBA Rookie of the Year Award. He was traded to the New Orleans Pelicans in 2013 before being traded back to the Kings in 2017. After successive stints with the Memphis Grizzlies and Indiana Pacers, Evans, who would have become a free agent at the end of the 2019 season, was dismissed and disqualified from the NBA in May for violating the terms of the league's anti-drug program, but was reinstated in February 2022.

== High school career ==
Tyreke Evans was born in Chester, Pennsylvania, where he was chiefly raised by his three older brothers. For high school, Evans attended American Christian Academy in Aston, Pennsylvania. There, he quickly proved an impressive talent on the basketball court, and by his sophomore season, began drawing comparisons to no less than Hall of Famer Tracy McGrady. In his senior campaign, he put up averages of 32.1 points, 8.8 rebounds, 5.7 assists, and 4.3 steals per game. He was selected as the MVP of the McDonald's High School All-American Game and, together with Brandon Jennings, was named co-MVP of the Jordan Brand Classic. He was also named to the first-team Parade All-American. He was featured in the documentary Gunning for That #1 Spot directed by Adam "MCA" Yauch of the Beastie Boys when he was only sixteen years of age. Evans was chosen to be the keeper of the Slam High School Diary for the 2008 season.

Considered a five-star recruit by Rivals.com, Evans was listed as the No. 3 point guard and the No. 6 player in the nation in 2008.

== College career ==
In April 2008, after also considering Villanova University and the University of Texas, Evans announced his commitment to the Memphis Tigers.

After playing small forward throughout high school, Evans initially struggled with his transition to shooting guard at Memphis. But as soon as coach John Calipari had him start at the point guard position for the eleventh game of the season, Evans flourished in a 60–45 win over Cincinnati; he played 33 minutes and tallied 14 points, 10 rebounds, and 8 assists, the latter two being season highs. With Evans at the helm, Memphis would not lose another game until the NCAA tournament, falling to the Missouri Tigers.

Evans won Conference USA Rookie of the Week as many as eight times. He was also the only freshman among the United States Basketball Writers Association's 2009 finalists for the National Player of the Year award that is named in honor of Oscar Robertson.

== Professional career ==
=== Sacramento Kings (2009–2013) ===
==== 2009–10: Rookie of the Year ====
On March 31, 2009, Evans declared himself eligible for the 2009 NBA draft, opting to forgo his remaining three seasons of collegiate eligibility. He was selected on June 25, 2009, by the Sacramento Kings with the fourth overall pick.

On December 1, 2009, Evans was named the Western Conference Rookie of the Month for games played from the beginning of the season through November. Over that period, he put up averages of 18.8 points, 5 rebounds, 4.7 assists, and 1.3 steals in 36.1 minutes per game. Also notably, on December 21, he led the Kings back from a 35-point deficit to defeat the Chicago Bulls 102–98; by scoring 9 of the Kings' last 11 points, he single-handedly outscored the Bulls in the fourth quarter, with his 11 points besting the Bulls' 10 points scored.

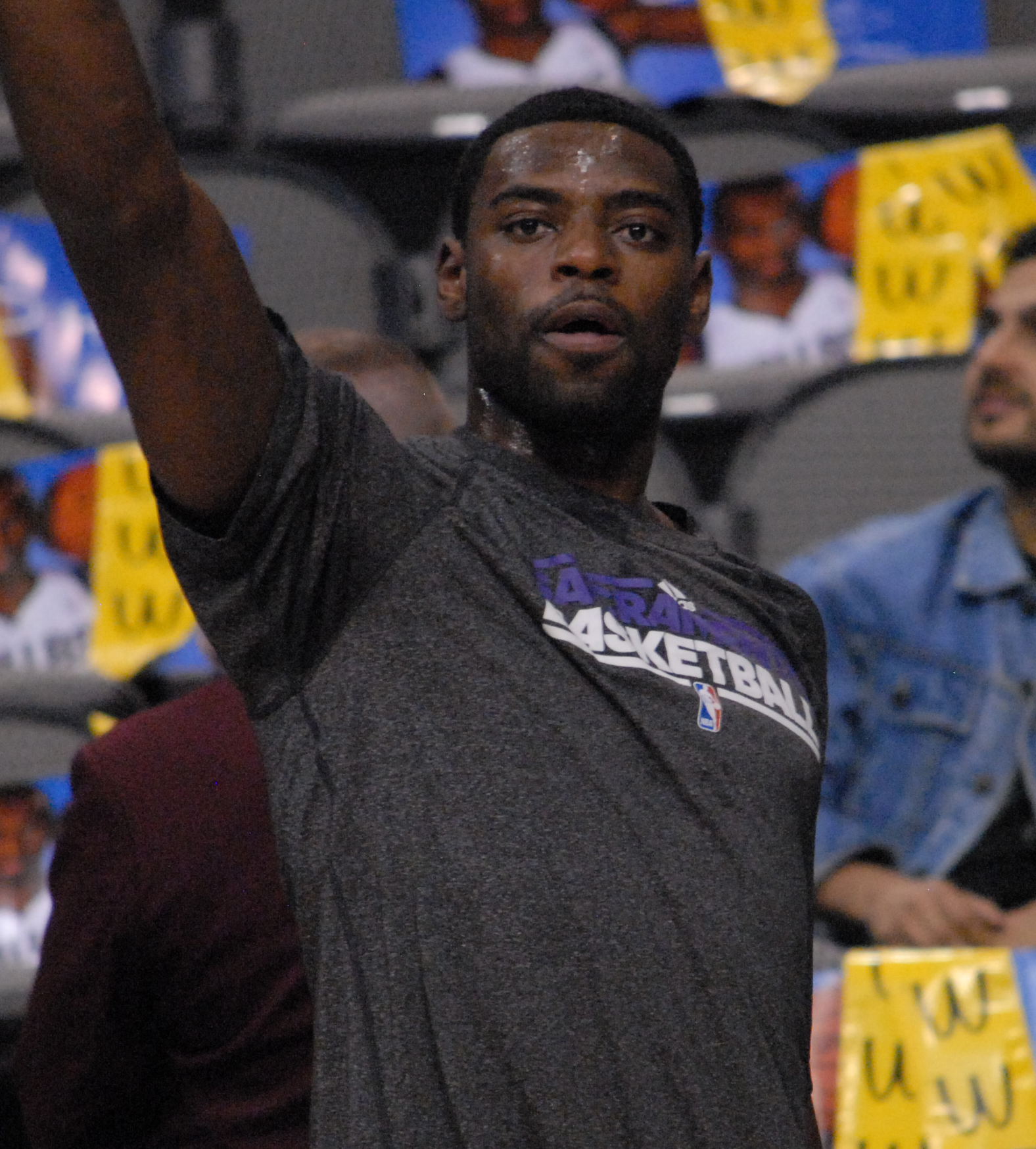
Evans with the Kings in December 2012

On January 4, 2010, Evans was named Western Conference Rookie of the Month for the second month straight. On February 12, Evans won the 2010 Rookie and Sophomore Game MVP award after recording 26 points, 6 rebounds, 5 assists, and 5 steals on 11-of-15 shooting. In an act of sportsmanship, Evans opted to share the award with DeJuan Blair, who had put up 22 points and pulled down 23 rebounds. In a victory over the Toronto Raptors on March 11, Evans recorded his first career triple-double with his 19 points to go along with 10 assists and as many rebounds. Evans became just the fourth rookie in NBA history to average at least 20 points, 5 rebounds, and 5 assists after Oscar Robertson (1960–61), Michael Jordan (1984–85), and LeBron James (2003–04). On April 27, 2010, Evans was recognized for his accomplishments by being awarded the 2009–10 NBA Rookie of the Year Award.

==== 2010–13: Later seasons ====
On December 29, 2010, O. J. Mayo hit an off-balance shot to put the Memphis Grizzlies up by one point with only seconds remaining in the game; with no timeouts left, DeMarcus Cousins inbounded the ball to Evans, who dribbled to half court and nailed a three-pointer to secure a two-point win for Sacramento. Though it came in a loss to the Golden State Warriors, Evans tallied a then career-high 35 points to go along with 5 rebounds, 3 assists, and 3 steals on January 21, 2011. He later missed 19 regular season games on account of plantar fasciitis in his left foot and thus did not play in that year's NBA Rookie Challenge.

On November 24, 2011, Evans agreed to a deal to play for Virtus Roma in Italy during the NBA lockout; the deal had an NBA out-clause allowing him to return to the Sacramento Kings when the lockout ceased. In December, he returned to the Kings after the 2011 NBA lockout had ended. On January 28, 2012, he scored a season-high 31 points in a 96–93 loss to the Utah Jazz.

In 2012–13, Evans missed 16 out of 20 games between November 30 and January 5 due to a left knee injury. He finished the season with averages of 15.2 points and 4.4 rebounds per game.

=== New Orleans Pelicans (2013–2017) ===
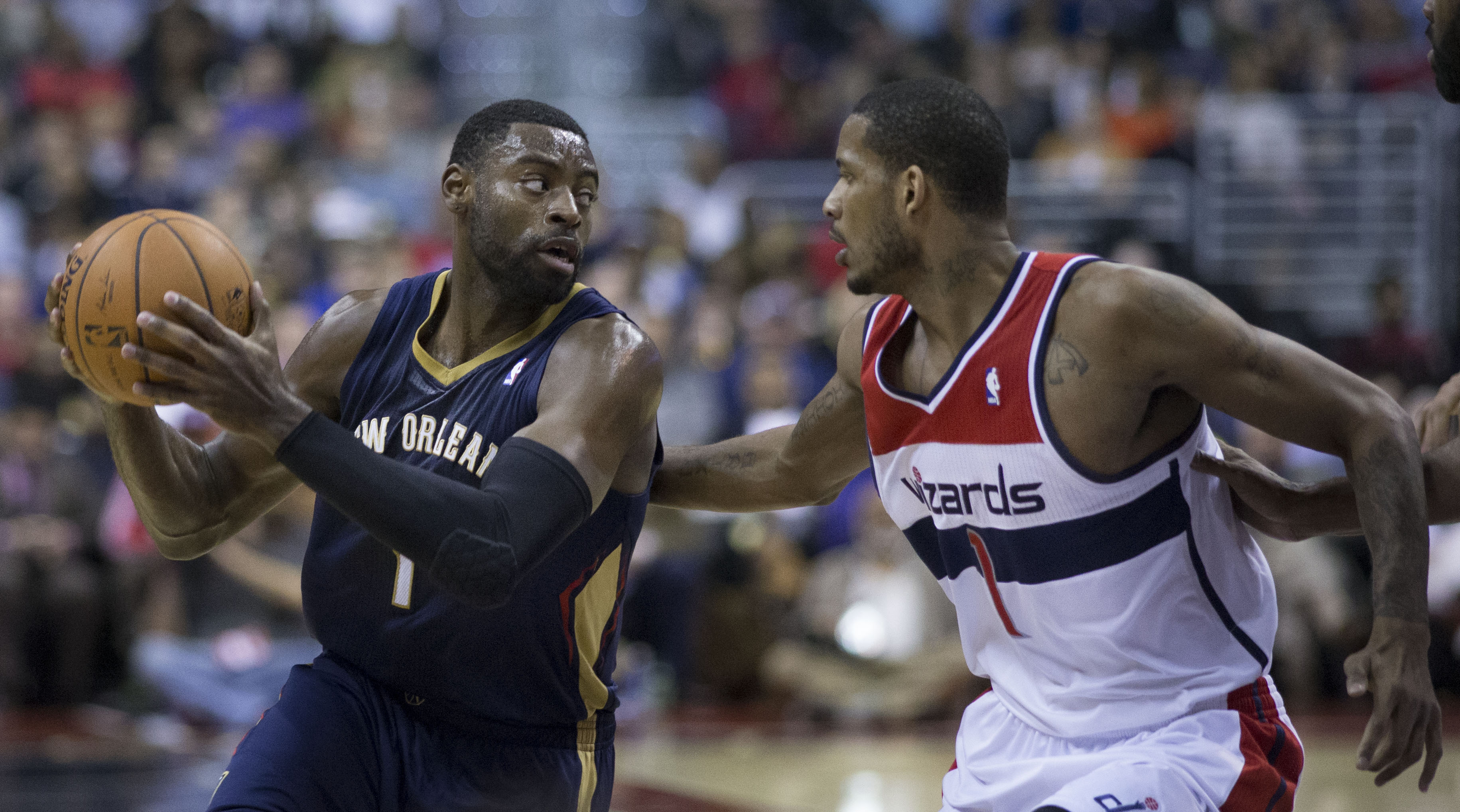
Evans with the Pelicans in February 2014, being defended by Trevor Ariza.

Evans was acquired by the New Orleans Pelicans on July 10, 2013, in a sign-and-trade deal involving three teams; the deal sent Robin Lopez to the Portland Trail Blazers and Greivis Vásquez to the Kings. On December 30 that year, Evans hit the game-clinching shot with 1.2 seconds remaining in a victory over the Trail Blazers. On April 14, 2014, he scored a career-high 41 points during a 101–89 win over the Oklahoma City Thunder.

In a 101–95 win over his former team, the Sacramento Kings, Evans tallied a near triple-double with 19 points, 12 rebounds, and 9 assists.

On December 1, 2015, he played his first game of the 2015–16 season after having missed the Pelicans' first 17 games while recovering from right knee surgery. In 31 minutes as a starter, Evans recorded 20 points and 10 assists in the loss to the Memphis Grizzlies. On the 11th of that same month, he scored 27 points and hit a career-high 5 three-pointers in a 105–103 win versus the Washington Wizards. On February 11, 2016, he underwent another round of surgery to his right knee and was ruled out for the rest of the season.

On December 15, 2016, being his first game since January 25, Evans played 11 minutes and posted 7 points, 3 rebounds, and 2 assists during a 102–95 victory over the Indiana Pacers. On January 12, 2017, Evans scored a season-high 29 points in a 104–95 victory over the Brooklyn Nets.

=== Return to Sacramento (2017) ===
On February 20, 2017, Evans was traded along with Buddy Hield, Langston Galloway, and 2017 first and second round draft picks to the Sacramento Kings in exchange for DeMarcus Cousins and Omri Casspi. Three days later, in his first game for the Kings since 2013, Evans scored 15 points off the bench in a 116–100 win over the Denver Nuggets. On March 8, 2017, he scored a season-high 26 points in a 114–104 loss to the San Antonio Spurs.

=== Memphis Grizzlies (2017–2018) ===
Evans signed with the Memphis Grizzlies on July 10, 2017. On November 1 of that year, he led the team with 32 points in a 101–99 loss to the Orlando Magic; it was his first 30-point performance since December 2014. Midway through the season, Evans filled in for the injured Mike Conley to become the team's starting point guard. On December 27, he accumulated 32 points, 7 rebounds, and 7 assists in a 109–99 victory over the Los Angeles Lakers. After being put on the trade block leading up to the trade deadline, Evans missed time in late January and early February. In his first game back for the Grizzlies on February 11, Evans recorded 12 points and 5 rebounds in a 110–92 loss to the Oklahoma City Thunder. On February 23, he put up 15 points and 10 assists in a 112–89 loss to the Cleveland Cavaliers. In the contest, Evans went 3 for 7 from outside the arc to make his 28th straight game with at least one 3-pointer, breaking the franchise record of 27 previously held by Mike Miller. On March 15 against the Chicago Bulls, Evans returned to the lineup following a 10-game absence because of a rib injury.

=== Indiana Pacers (2018–2019) ===
On July 6, 2018, Evans signed with the Indiana Pacers. In the season-opener on October 17, he posted 14 points and 5 assists to debut for his new franchise and help defeat his former team, the Memphis Grizzlies, 111–83. On November 16, he hit five 3-pointers and scored a season-high 23 points off the bench in a 99–91 win over the Miami Heat. In game four of the Pacers' first-round playoff series against the Boston Celtics, he scored a playoff career-high 21 points in a 110–106 series-ending loss.

=== NBA suspension (2019–2022) ===
On May 17, 2019, Evans was banned from the NBA for violating the terms of its Anti-Drug Program that prohibits drug abuse. He became eligible to apply for reinstatement in 2021, and was officially reinstated on February 14, 2022.

=== Wisconsin Herd (2022) ===
On March 16, 2022, Evans signed with the Wisconsin Herd of the NBA G League. On March 23, he was waived.

== Career statistics ==
Legend
GP	Games played	GS	Games started	MPG	Minutes per game
FG%	Field goal percentage	3P%	3-point field goal percentage	FT%	Free throw percentage
RPG	Rebounds per game	APG	Assists per game	SPG	Steals per game
BPG	Blocks per game	PPG	Points per game	**Bold**	Career high

=== NBA ===
==== Regular season ====
Year	Team	GP	GS	MPG	FG%	3P%	FT%	RPG	APG	SPG	BPG	PPG
2009–10	Sacramento	72	72	**37.2**	.458	.255	.748	**5.3**	5.8	**1.5**	.4	**20.1**
2010–11	Sacramento	57	53	37.0	.409	.291	.771	4.8	5.6	**1.5**	**.5**	17.8
2011–12	Sacramento	63	61	34.3	.453	.202	.779	4.6	4.5	1.3	**.5**	16.5
2012–13	Sacramento	65	61	31.0	**.478**	.338	.775	4.4	3.5	1.4	.4	15.2
2013–14	New Orleans	72	22	28.2	.436	.221	.771	4.7	5.0	1.2	.3	14.5
2014–15	New Orleans	**79**	**76**	34.1	.447	.304	.694	**5.3**	**6.6**	1.3	**.5**	16.6
2015–16	New Orleans	25	25	30.6	.433	.388	**.796**	5.2	**6.6**	1.3	.3	15.2
2016–17	New Orleans	26	0	18.2	.401	.300	.776	3.3	3.5	.9	.2	9.5
2016–17	Sacramento	14	6	22.4	.413	**.408**	.706	3.6	2.4	.9	.4	11.6
2017–18	Memphis	52	32	30.9	.452	.381	.785	5.2	5.2	1.1	.3	19.4
2018–19	Indiana	69	18	20.3	.389	.356	.719	2.9	2.4	.8	.3	10.2
Career		594	426	30.7	.440	.323	.757	4.6	4.8	1.2	.4	15.7

==== Playoffs ====
Year	Team	GP	GS	MPG	FG%	3P%	FT%	RPG	APG	SPG	BPG	PPG
2015	New Orleans	**4**	**4**	**31.3**	.326	.182	**.588**	**5.0**	**5.0**	**1.3**	**.3**	10.0
2019	Indiana	**4**	0	21.0	**.438**	**.550**	.571	4.3	.8	.5	**.3**	**15.3**
Career		8	4	26.1	.385	.419	.581	4.6	2.9	.9	.3	12.6

=== College ===
Year	Team	GP	GS	MPG	FG%	3P%	FT%	RPG	APG	SPG	BPG	PPG
2008–09	Memphis	37	35	29.0	.455	.274	.711	5.4	3.9	2.1	.8	17.1

== See also ==
- List of people banned or suspended by the NBA
