= 2009–10 Los Angeles Lakers season =

Season of National Basketball Association team the Los Angeles Lakers

- NBA champions
- Conference champions
- Division champions
- Head coach: Phil Jackson
- President: Jim Buss (vice)
- General manager: Mitch Kupchak
- Owner: Jerry Buss
- Arena: Staples Center

Results
- Record: 57–25 (.695)
- Place: Division: 1st (Pacific); Conference: 1st (Western)
- Playoff finish: NBA champions (Defeated Celtics 4–3)
- Stats at Basketball Reference

Local media
- Television: Home: FS West HD Away: KCAL 9 HD
- Radio: 710 ESPN

The 2009–10 Los Angeles Lakers season was the 62nd season of the franchise, 61st in the National Basketball Association (NBA) and 50th in Los Angeles. During the offseason, the Lakers signed free agent and former defensive player of the year forward Ron Artest. Coming off from winning their fifteenth championship in the NBA Finals defeating the Orlando Magic in five games, the Lakers successfully defended their title. They spent the most money of any team on player salaries that season, totaling $112.7 million ($91.3 million on player salaries and $21.4 million on luxury tax). The Lakers once again sold out all 41 home games for the season at Staples Center.

The Lakers clinched the Pacific Division for the 21st time in franchise history. Despite winning eight games less than the previous season, they still held the top seed in the Western Conference playoffs and made it to the NBA Finals for the third straight season in which they defeated the Oklahoma City Thunder in six games in the first round, swept the Utah Jazz in four games in semifinals and the Phoenix Suns in six games in the Western Conference Finals in which the Lakers were favored to beat the Suns en route to advancing to the NBA Finals where they defeated the Boston Celtics in a rematch of the 2008 NBA Finals won by the Celtics 4 games to 2. This time, the Lakers won the series 4 games to 3 for their 16th NBA title and handed Boston its first Game 7 loss in an NBA Finals in team history. Kobe Bryant won his second consecutive NBA Finals MVP as well as his fifth and final NBA Championship. After the Finals, Bryant underwent arthroscopic surgery on his right knee in July.

On July 14, 2010, Phil Jackson won the 2010 ESPY Awards for Best Coach/Manager while Kobe Bryant won for Best NBA Player.

This was the last time the Lakers won an NBA championship until 2020.

== Key dates ==
- June 25 – The 2009 NBA draft took place in New York City.
- July 8 – The free agency period started.
- October 7 – The Lakers played their first preseason game of the season against the Golden State Warriors.
- October 27 – The Lakers' regular season began with a home game versus the Los Angeles Clippers. The previous year's players received their championship rings and the team raised their 15th championship banner into the Staples Center rafters.
- January 25 – The previous year's players and staff visited the White House to meet President Barack Obama.
- February 12–14 – The 2010 NBA All-Star Weekend took place.
- March 19 – The Lakers clinched a post-season berth for the 29th time in 31 years. They are the first Western Conference team this season to clinch a playoff berth.
- April 5 – The Lakers clinched their third consecutive and 21st overall Pacific Division title Saturday night with the Phoenix Suns' loss at the Milwaukee Bucks.
- April 9 – The Lakers clinched the top seed in the Western Conference with a win against the Minnesota Timberwolves.
- April 14 – The Lakers played their final game of the regular season in a road game against the Los Angeles Clippers.
- April 18 – The Lakers played the Oklahoma City Thunder in their first game of the 2010 NBA Playoffs.
- June 17 – The Lakers beat the Celtics in Game 7 of the 2010 NBA Finals to win their 16th NBA title.

== Offseason ==
=== Injuries ===
The Lakers came into training camp with no serious injuries. All players were expected to be healthy enough to play in the season opener. After having surgery on his knee last season, Andrew Bynum was told that he has ligamentous laxity, which required him to wear a knee brace for the entire season.

During training camp, D. J. Mbenga was not able to participate fully in practice due to a "malalignment of his hips/hip flexors". The imbalance was causing him pain in his abdominal, groin and hip flexor areas. He made a full recovery and played on opening night. Pau Gasol injured his hamstring during a preseason game and missed the first 12 games of the season. In December, Ron Artest revealed that he suffered a shoulder injury during the Lakers' opening exhibition game. He kept the injury quiet so it wouldn't seem like he was making excuses, telling neither the media nor his coaches.

=== Departures ===
Trevor Ariza chose not to sign when the Los Angeles Lakers offered the Mid-Level Exception (approximately $6 million per year). When the Lakers looked towards other free agents, Ariza agreed to sign with the Houston Rockets for slightly more money. The Lakers had a team option on Sun Yue to pick up his contract for one year paying him $736,000. But the Lakers decided to release him to keep the roster to 13 players. Sun eventually signed with the New York Knicks.

Assistant coach Kurt Rambis left the Lakers to pursue a head-coaching position with the Minnesota Timberwolves. Rambis was believed to be the potential replacement to Phil Jackson if Jackson was to leave in the offseason.

=== Signings ===
The Lakers had team options to exercise contracts on Josh Powell and D. J. Mbenga. The Lakers decided to bring both Powell and Mbenga back, paying them $959,000 each. Kobe Bryant also had an option to terminate his contract this offseason, which would pay him approximately $23,000,000 for the season and $24,800,000 for the season after. He chose not to opt out of his contract and signed a 3-year contract extension.

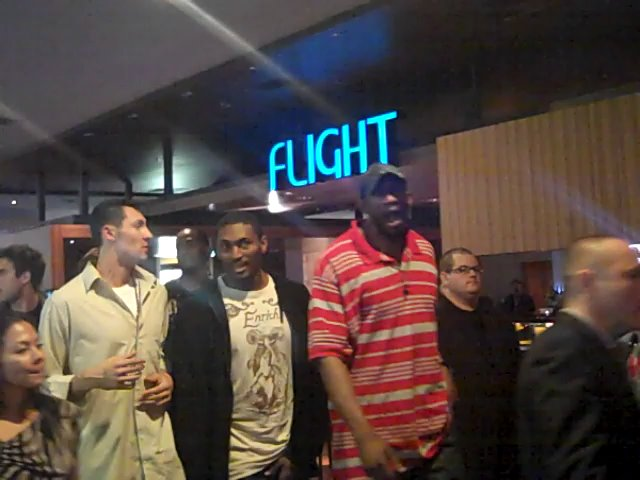
The Los Angeles Lakers (Artest and Mbenga pictured) at the Luxor Las Vegas after a pre-season game.

Ron Artest was the first player from another team to sign with the Los Angeles Lakers this offseason. On July 2, Artest told CBSSports.com that he has agreed to a contract with the Lakers. He decided not to pursue a more lucrative contract from his former team (the Rockets) and signed a 5-year deal worth $33 million on July 8. The Lakers used their Mid-Level Exception to sign Artest. Artest has long wanted to play for the Lakers and was looking forward to playing with Kobe Bryant and childhood friend Lamar Odom. Artest changed his jersey number from 96 to 37 in honor of Michael Jackson's album Thriller which was the #1 selling album for 37 weeks. Jackson had died 13 days earlier.

Shannon Brown agreed to a contract with the Lakers on July 6. Brown turned down a more expensive offer from the Indiana Pacers and agreed to a 2-year $4.2 million deal. The Lakers used the Bi-annual exception to sign Brown. He has a player option to terminate his contract after the 2009–10 season.

Lamar Odom was the last Lakers free agent to resign with the team. Before the previous season ended, Odom said he was willing to take a pay cut from the $11.4 million he made in his final year of his contract (which was $14.1 million under the Lakers salary cap because the difference was paid upfront as a "trade-kicker" when he joined the Lakers). Early in July, the Lakers presented two offers to Odom:

- A four-year deal for $9 million a season, worth up to $36 million, but only three years and $27 million was guaranteed, with the Lakers' buyout in the fourth year worth $3 million.
- A three-year, $30-million deal that would have paid Odom $10 million a season.

When Odom and his agent did not respond quickly enough, owner Jerry Buss pulled both deals off the table. At the same time, the Miami Heat actively pursue Odom. Heat President Pat Riley and Dwyane Wade met with Odom in Los Angeles in an attempt to get Odom to return to Miami. Afterwards, Odom spoke with Jerry Buss, and Odom's agent and Lakers General Manager Mitch Kupchak kept an open dialogue. On July 30, Lamar Odom agreed to a four-year deal, reportedly for $33 million, with a team option for the final year. Odom said he did not want to leave Pau Gasol, Andrew Bynum, Derek Fisher and the rest of the Lakers, especially Kobe Bryant.

On September 28, the Lakers signed four players to non-guaranteed contracts: Tony Gaffney, Srdjan Pejicic, David Monds, Mickaël Gelabale and Michael Fey. On September 30, the Lakers also signed Thomas Kelati to a non-guaranteed contract, bring their total player roster to 18 players. By the beginning of the season, they had to reduce their roster to a maximum of 15 players. On October 10, the Lakers cut Mickaël Gelabale, David Monds, and Michael Fey, bringing the roster to 15 players. On October 21, Thomas Kelati was cut from the team. On October 24, the Lakers cut Gaffney.

=== Trades ===
The Lakers traded their first-round draft pick (#29) to the New York Knicks for $3,000,000 and the Knicks 2011 second-round draft pick. The Lakers traded their second pick (originally from the Charlotte Bobcats for the Kareem Rush trade) for cash.

=== Draft ===
The Lakers originally had three picks entering the Draft. Their 29th pick was used to pick Toney Douglas from Florida State, and chose Patrick Beverley from Arkansas with their 42nd pick, a pick which they got from a previous trade with Charlotte. The Lakers traded both each for a 2011 second-round draft pick and cash. They kept their final pick and selected Chinemelu Elonu. The Texas A&M center earned All-Big 12 honors last season after averaging 9.8 points and a team-best 7.3 rebounds and 53 blocked shots. He set a school record by making 66.5 percent from the field and was named the Big 12's most improved player.

Round	Pick	Player	Position	Nationality	School/Club team
1	29	Toney Douglas	Guard	United States	Florida State
2	42	Patrick Beverley	Guard	United States	Arkansas
2	59	Chinemelu Elonu	Power Forward	Nigeria/United States	Texas A&M

== Roster ==
2009–10 Los Angeles Lakers roster
Players

Pos.	No.	Player	Height	Weight	DOB	From
SF	37	Ron Artest	6 ft 7 in (2.01 m)	260 lb (118 kg)	1979-11-13	St. John's
SG	12	Shannon Brown	6 ft 4 in (1.93 m)	210 lb (95 kg)	1985-11-29	Michigan State
SG	24	Kobe Bryant	6 ft 6 in (1.98 m)	205 lb (93 kg)	1978-08-23	Lower Merion HS (PA)
C	17	Andrew Bynum	7 ft 0 in (2.13 m)	285 lb (129 kg)	1987-10-27	St. Joseph HS (NJ)
PG	1	Jordan Farmar	6 ft 2 in (1.88 m)	180 lb (82 kg)	1986-11-30	UCLA
PG	2	Derek Fisher	6 ft 1 in (1.85 m)	210 lb (95 kg)	1974-08-09	Little Rock
PF	16	Pau Gasol	7 ft 0 in (2.13 m)	250 lb (113 kg)	1980-07-06	Spain
C	28	D. J. Mbenga	7 ft 0 in (2.13 m)	255 lb (116 kg)	1980-12-30	DR Congo
SF	6	Adam Morrison	6 ft 8 in (2.03 m)	205 lb (93 kg)	1984-07-19	Gonzaga
PF	7	Lamar Odom	6 ft 10 in (2.08 m)	230 lb (104 kg)	1979-11-06	Rhode Island
PF	21	Josh Powell	6 ft 9 in (2.06 m)	240 lb (109 kg)	1983-01-25	NC State
SG	18	Sasha Vujačić	6 ft 7 in (2.01 m)	205 lb (93 kg)	1984-03-08	Slovenia
SF	4	Luke Walton	6 ft 8 in (2.03 m)	235 lb (107 kg)	1980-03-28	Arizona

Coaches
Head coach
- Phil Jackson
Assistant(s)
- Kareem Abdul-Jabbar
- Jim Cleamons
- Frank Hamblen
- Craig Hodges
- Brian Shaw

Legend
- (DP) Unsigned draft pick
- (FA) Free agent
- (S) Suspended
- Injured

Roster
Updated: 2009-10-26

== Season summary ==
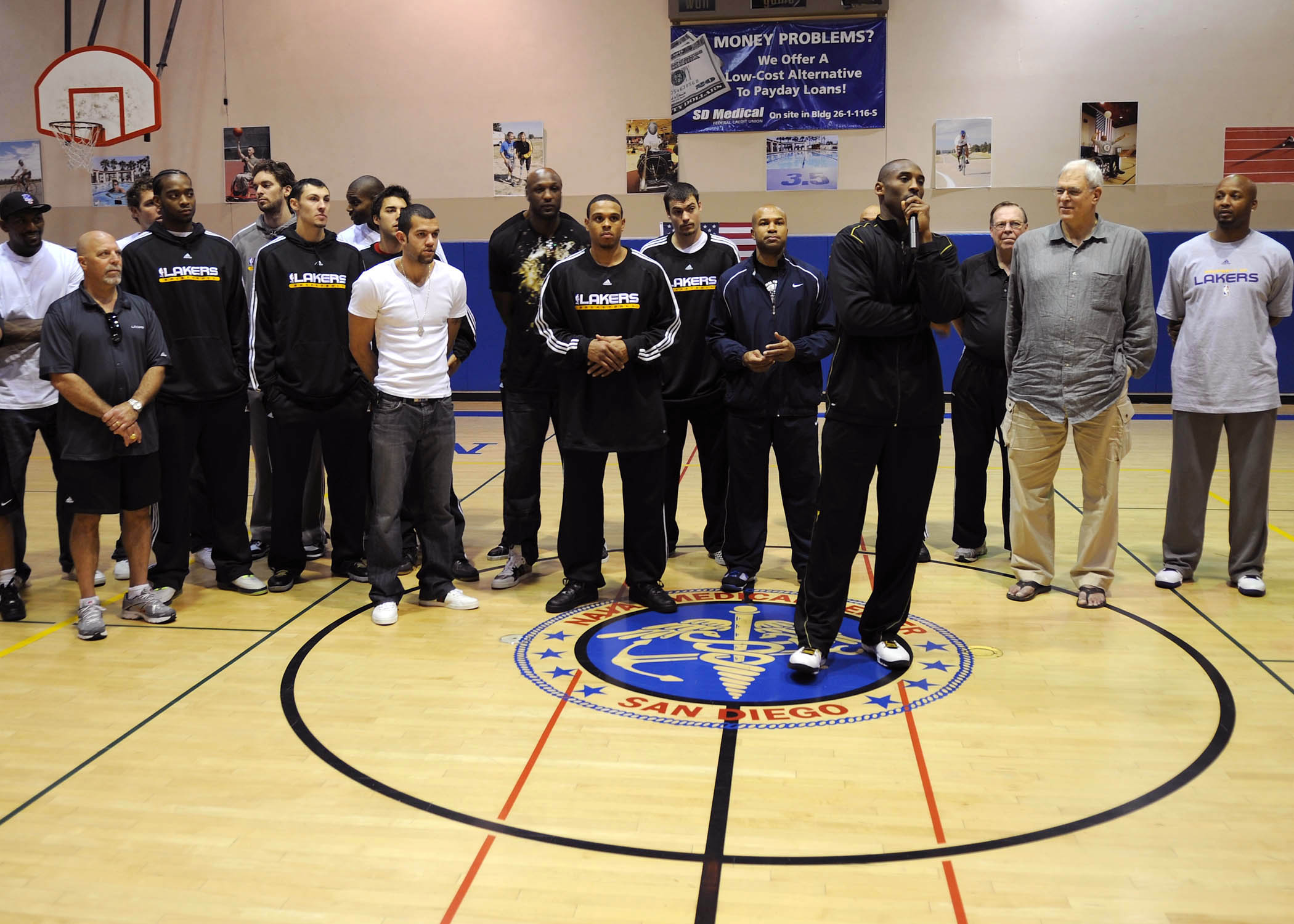
The Los Angeles Lakers on October 23, 2009, at the Bob Wilson Naval Hospital gym in San Diego

The Los Angeles Lakers opened the season at home against their intra-city rival the Los Angeles Clippers. Before the game, the remaining Lakers on the team from last year received their 2009 NBA championship rings. Pau Gasol missed the first 11 games due to his hamstring injury, so Lamar Odom moved to power forward and was placed in the starting lineup. The season opened with the starting lineup being:

- PG – Derek Fisher
- SG – Kobe Bryant
- SF – Ron Artest
- PF – Lamar Odom
- C – Andrew Bynum

The Lakers started off 7–1, then lost two in a row. Luke Walton was another player who was injured, suffering a pinched nerve in his back on November 16. He was out for approximately six weeks. However, Gasol came back soon after and the Lakers returned to their normal lineup (with Odom coming off the bench):

- PG – Derek Fisher
- SG – Kobe Bryant
- SF – Ron Artest
- PF – Pau Gasol
- C – Andrew Bynum

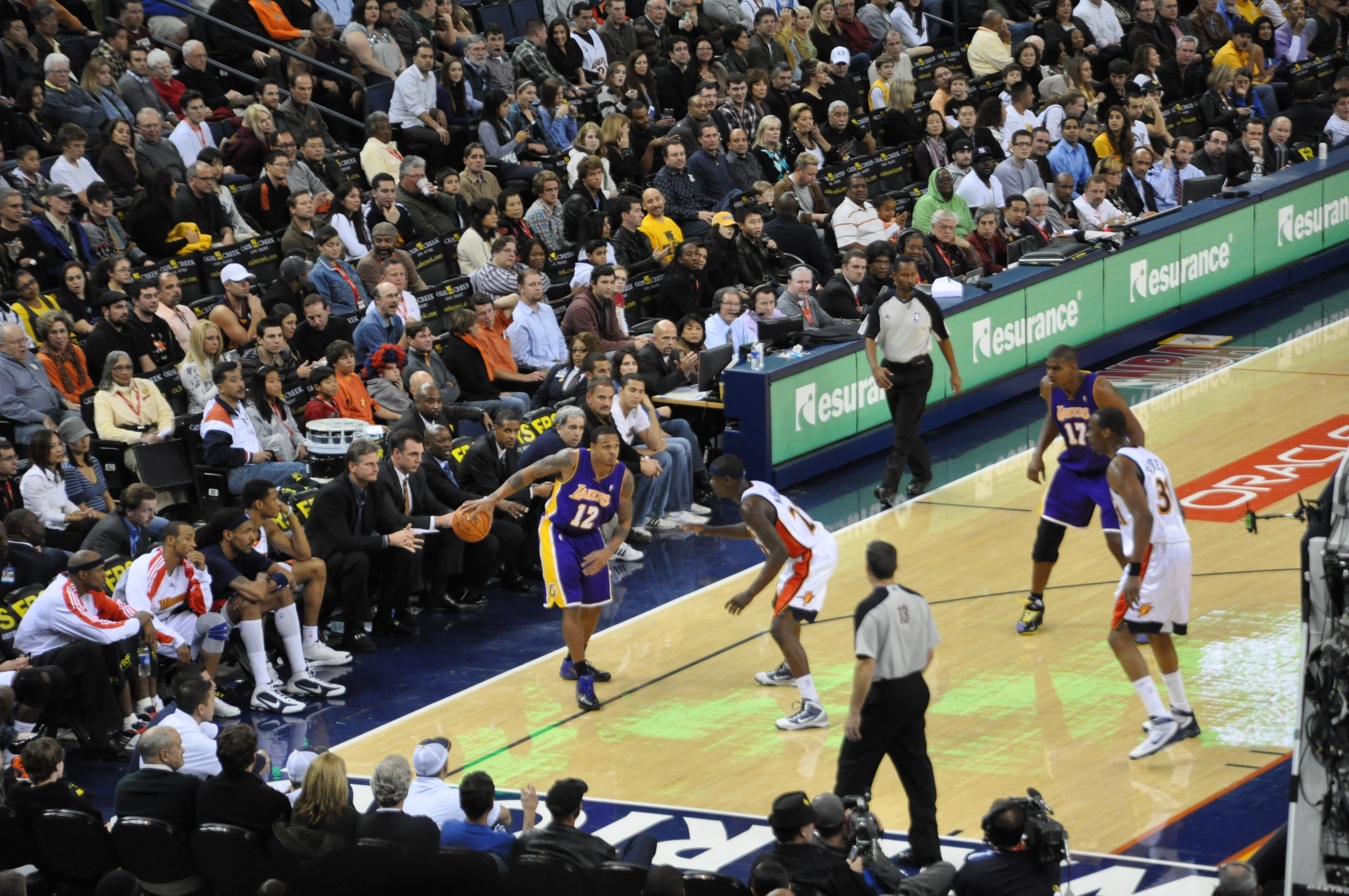
Brown and Bynum being guarded by Anthony Morrow and Chris Hunter

Through the first 14 games of the season, the Lakers ranked second in the league in defensive field-goal shooting (41.7%). They also had to deal with poor play by reserve players. After Gasol's return, the Lakers went 10–0, which included a game on December 4 when Bryant made a three-pointer as time expired to lift the Lakers past the Miami Heat 108–107. Their 11-game winning streak ended on December 12 against the Utah Jazz. On December 11, Bryant suffered a fracture in his right index finger in a game against the Minnesota Timberwolves, but it didn't force him to miss any games. On December 16, Bryant made another game-winning shot, this time against the Milwaukee Bucks in overtime. The Lakers went on a five-game winning streak heading into their Christmas Day game at home against the Cleveland Cavaliers. They lost the game for their third home defeat of the season. Later that night, Ron Artest suffered a concussion from tripping over a box and falling down a flight of stairs. He missed five games to recover. The Lakers struggled with his absence, giving up 100 or more points in four consecutive games. On January 1, Bryant made a three-pointer at the buzzer to beat the Sacramento Kings. It was the third time that season that Bryant made a buzzer-beater to win a game. On January 3, Gasol mildly strained his left hamstring in the first quarter against the Dallas Mavericks and had to leave the game. Artest returned to play the next game versus the Houston Rockets, and Odom almost recorded a triple double with 17 points, 19 rebounds, and 9 assists. After Christmas, the Lakers struggled, going 6–5. Since then, both Walton (28 games) and Gasol (six games) returned from injuries and the Lakers played with a full roster for the first time that season against the Clippers on January 15.

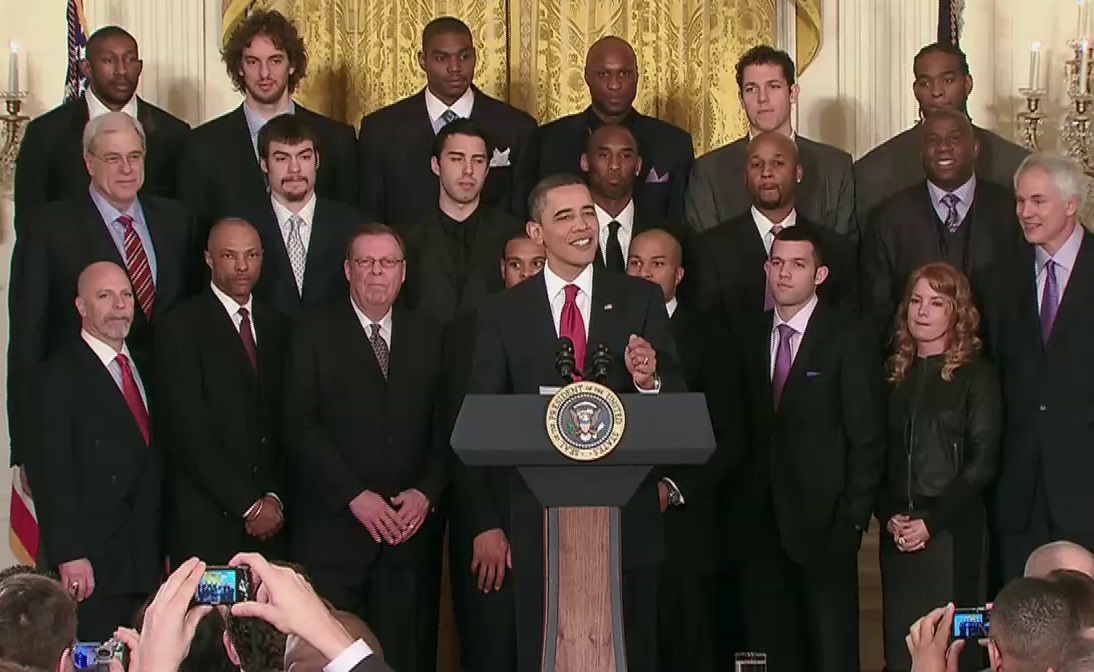
Barack Obama speaking with the Los Angeles Lakers on January 25, 2010, at the White House

On January 21, the Lakers began the second half of the season by playing eight consecutive road games in 12 days. Beginning with a rematch of the Christmas Day game against the Cavaliers and concluding on February 1 against the Memphis Grizzlies, the defending champions also visited the White House to meet President Barack Obama.

January 25, 2010 White House visit (8:49)
Barack Obama hosted the 2008–09 Los Angeles Lakers at the White House following their victory in the 2009 NBA Finals.

Against the Memphis Grizzlies, Bryant surpassed Jerry West to become the Lakers' all-time leading scorer. The Lakers finished the road trip 5–3. In February, Gasol was named winner of two of the three most prestigious annual awards given to European players, based on performances during the 2009 calendar year for both national and club teams. On December 27, Gasol was announced by the Italian magazine Superbasket as the winner of its Mr. Europa award and on December 28, Gasol was announced by the Italian sports newspaper La Gazzetta dello Sport as the winner of its Euroscar. On February 6 against the Portland Trail Blazers, an injured Bryant sat out for a game for the first time since 2007. Odom matched a career high with 22 rebounds in the Lakers' win, the first time they had won in Portland since 2005. Gasol produced 21 points, 19 rebounds, eight assists and five blocks in a win on February 8 against the San Antonio Spurs, joining five other players to accomplish the feat. The Lakers headed to the All-Star break on a three-game winning streak. All three victories came without Bryant and the final two were without Bynum.

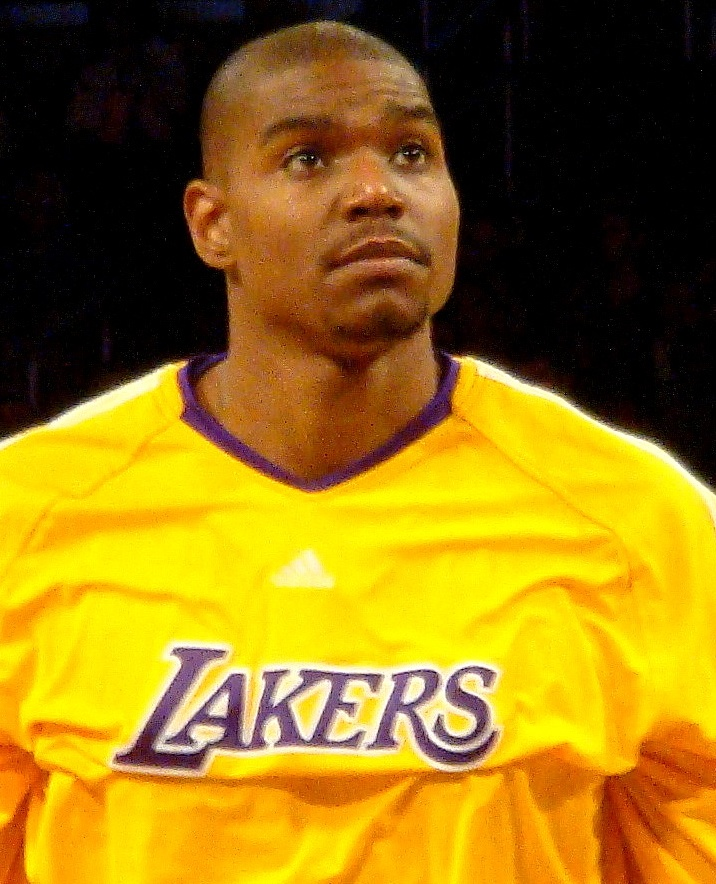
Andrew Bynum missed the end of the regular season with an injury.

Bryant was voted as a starter for the 2010 NBA All-Star Game, but sat out due to injury. Gasol was selected as a reserve for the West and logged 13 points and six rebounds in 20 minutes. Brown entered the dunk contest but was defeated in the second round.

Bryant returned from injury on February 23 against the Memphis Grizzlies. The Lakers went 4-1 without him. Bryant made a three-pointer with 4.3 seconds left to lift the Lakers to a 99–98 victory. However, the Lakers went 4–4 in the eight games after Bryant's return. Since the All-Star break, the Lakers have struggled, recording a 5–5 record including the first three-game losing streak since Gasol joined the team in a trade two years earlier. The team also had to deal with injuries to Sasha Vujacic and Luke Walton. The Lakers responded by winning five games in a row, but Bynum suffered an injury and was removed from the active roster. It was revealed that Bynum strained his Achilles tendon against the Minnesota Timberwolves on March 19, and that he was expected to miss almost two weeks (six games) to recover. After their three-game losing streak, the Lakers responded by winning seven games in a row, then lost two of their next seven. They were the eighth best team in the Western Conference between the All-Star break and April 5 by record, but still held the top seed. Bryant chose to miss three of the final four regular-season games to recover from injuries. Bynum returned from injury for the first game of the playoffs.

== Post-season summary ==
=== Oklahoma City Thunder ===
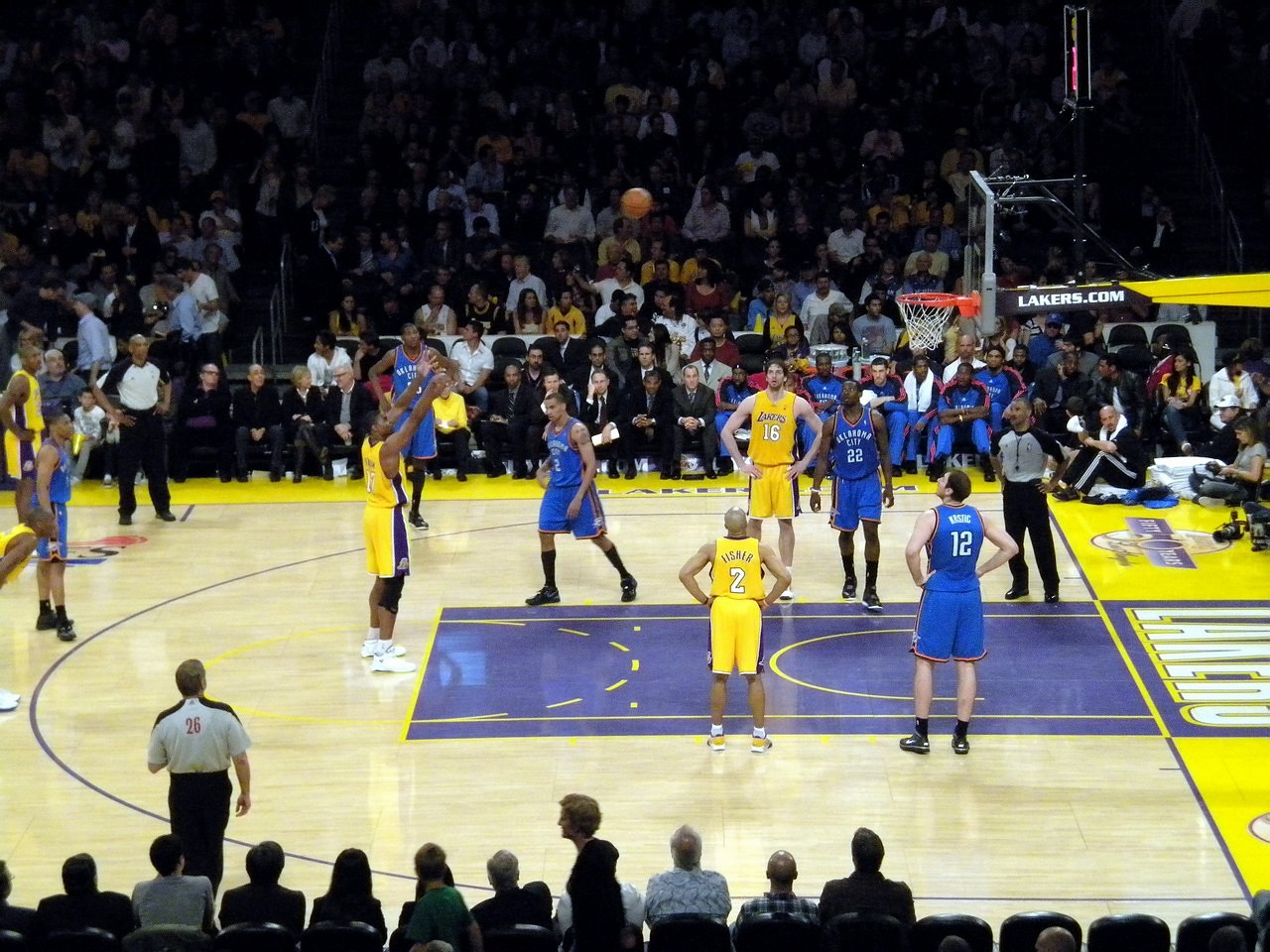
Andrew Bynum shoots a free throw against the Thunder in game 5.

The Lakers played the Oklahoma City Thunder in the first round of the playoffs. Both Bryant and Bynum returned from injury to start in the first game. In game one, the Lakers outscored the Thunder 27–13 in the first quarter. The Thunder attempted to close in on the lead, but the Lakers held on in the 2nd half, matching the Thunder's point total in the 3rd and 4th quarter. Although Bryant led the Lakers in points scored (21), Gasol had the most impressive night statically, collecting 19 points, 13 rebounds, three assists, and three blocks. The series went to Oklahoma City for games three and four. The Thunder won both games including a 21-point win in game 4. Kevin Durant averaged 30.5 points in the two games to lead the Thunder. During the two games, the Thunder used their speed to run on the Lakers which translated into 24 fast-break points and 23 second-chance points in game 4. In game 5 in L.A., Gasol and Bynum combined for 46 points, 22 rebounds, and six assists in a 111–87 win. Game six saw the Lakers returning to Oklahoma City where they could clinch the series with the win. The Lakers' bench outscored the Thunder's 30–16, however the Thunder claimed a one-point lead with 3:04 to play. With time winding down, Gasol caught an offensive rebound off of a missed jump shot by Bryant and scored a layup with 0.5 seconds remaining in the game for the win.

=== Utah Jazz ===
The Lakers next opponent was the Utah Jazz who advanced to the second round of the playoffs by defeating the Denver Nuggets 4–2. This was the third straight year the two teams met in the playoffs. The Lakers started off the first quarter shooting 79.8% from the field, and leading by 10 at half time. The Lakers gave up the lead in the 4th quarter before Bryant scored 11 points in the final four minutes to lead the Lakers to a 104–99 victory. Although Bryant had the most successful night in game 2, it was the Lakers front court of Gasol, Bynum, and Odom who dominated the game. Each had at least 11 points, 14 rebounds, and two blocks while the team outrebounded the Jazz 58–40 to a 111–103 victory. Andrei Kirilenko returned in game 3 from more than a month out with a strained left calf. While the Lakers' big men were dominate in the first two games, they had to rely on their backcourt in game 3 with Bynum and Odom being held in check. Jazz coach Jerry Sloan said the Jazz's effort to keep the Lakers out of the middle opened up some 3-point shots and Los Angeles capitalized. Artest scored 18 of his 20 points in the second half while overcoming his three-point range slump in the playoffs. The fourth quarter had 12 lead changes, including Bryant and Fisher making back-to-back 3-pointers during an 8–2 run in the final minute. In the final four seconds, Deron Williams missed a shot and Wesley Matthews rebound and tip missed just before the end of the game. The Lakers won 111-110 and were on the verge of sweeping the Jazz. In game four, the Lakers jumped ahead and led by 22 points in the first half. The Jazz opened the third quarter with an 11–2 run and were able to cut the lead to 70–65, but the Lakers responded by finishing the period on a 10–2 run and led 80–67 at the end of the third quarter. The Lakers led by 10 for most of the 4th quarter. Coach Phil Jackson called it "the first really consistent game we have played...We controlled the game and forced our will on our opponent." Bryant scored at least 30 points in all four games and the Lakers swept the series 4–0.

=== Phoenix Suns ===
The Lakers then faced the Phoenix Suns in the Western Conference Finals. In game 1, the Lakers blew out the Suns 128-107 led by Bryant's 40 points including 23 in the third quarter. Odom came off the bench to tally 19 points, 19 rebounds, and three assists. In game 2 Bryant played the role of facilitator, putting up 13 assists, while Gasol recorded 29 points, 9 rebounds, and five assists. The teams were tied at 90-90 heading into the fourth quarter, but Bryant and Gasol led the fourth quarter rally and the Lakers won the game 124–112. Game 3 was played in Phoenix, where the Suns used their big men and physical play to win the game. Amar'e Stoudemire scored 42 points and grabbed 11 rebounds while Robin Lopez 20 points. Odom and Bynum, however, both picked up fouls early and were ineffective for the Lakers for most of the game. The Lakers only scored 15 points in the second quarter and were down 86–84 in after three quarters. The Lakers were able to take the lead 90–89 with 8:47 to play, but the Suns rallied back to win 118–109. After battling each other in game 4 and slugging out a 23-23 first quarter, the Suns erupted for a 41 points in the second quarter, shooting 74%. Early in the 4th quarter the Lakers led 87–85. However, the Suns reserve players (who outscored the Lakers reserves 54–20) produced and 18–3 run in the 4th which the Lakers never recovered from despite Bryant's 38 points and 10 assists. In game 5, the Lakers surged to a 16-point lead in the first half including a 21–4 run and led by 18 points by half time. Steve Nash, who had 29 points and 11 assists in the game, led the Suns to a 16-4 rally in the third quarter to trim the lead to six by the end of the period and one with 2:52 left in the game. Jason Richardson made a three pointer with 3.5 seconds left in the game to tie the score 101-101. On the next possession, Bryant, who had 30 points and 11 assists in the game, air-balled a three, but Artest offensively rebounded and made a game winning layup as time expired. In game 6 in Phoenix, the Lakers had the lead for most of the game. Los Angeles outscored the Suns 23–10 over the last eight minutes of the second quarter to lead 65–53 at the break and were up by 17 entering the fourth. However the Suns went on a 16–4 run and cut the Lakers lead to 95–90 with 6:09 remaining in the game. Artest scored 25 in the game and Bryant had a 37-point performance including nine points in the final two minutes to win the game 111-103 and clinch the series 4–2.

=== Boston Celtics ===
The Los Angeles Lakers took game one against the Boston Celtics, winning by 13 (102–89). Kobe Bryant scored game high 30 points. Pau Gasol lead game high of rebounds (14). Celtics took game two to tie the series (1–1), with a victory of (103–94). Ray Allen scored 32 points (including then–NBA Finals record eight three–pointers a record remained for eight years until Stephen Curry breaks his own record with nine three–pointers in the 2018 NBA Finals.) with Rajon Rondo lead in rebounds (12). In game three, it was a close fought game, Lakers came out with a (91–84) victory with a 29-point performance by Kobe Bryant in Boston to take (2–1) lead in the series. Game four in Boston, the Celtics out fought the Lakers with a (96–89), performance to tie the series again (2–2). Kobe Bryant still lead the game high points of 33. Celtics took advantage of home court in game five with a (92–86) victory. Paul Pierce scored 27 points to lead the Celtics to a (3–2) lead in the series. With a crucial game six, the Lakers put on a dominant performance at the Staples Center with a 19-point victory (89–67) to tie the series 3 games apiece (3–3). In a pivotal game seven, the rivalry of the Lakers and the Celtics once again met in a game seven. The Lakers struggled the first half as the Celtics had control of the game for most of the three quarters. Within five minutes left in the game, Kobe Bryant made crucial plays to lead the Lakers to the 16th NBA title and also making Kobe Bryant a five-time NBA Champion.

== Standings ==
Pacific Division	W	L	PCT	GB	Home	Road	Div
c-Los Angeles Lakers	57	25	.695	–	34–7	23–18	13–3
x-Phoenix Suns	54	28	.659	3	32–9	22–19	12–4
Los Angeles Clippers	29	53	.354	28	21–20	8–33	5–11
Golden State Warriors	26	56	.317	31	18–23	8–33	5–11
Sacramento Kings	25	57	.305	32	18–23	7–34	5–11

#	Western Conference				
#	Team	W	L	PCT	GB
1	c-Los Angeles Lakers	57	25	.695	–
2	y-Dallas Mavericks	55	27	.671	2
3	x-Phoenix Suns	54	28	.659	3
4	y-Denver Nuggets	53	29	.646	4
5	x-Utah Jazz	53	29	.646	4
6	x-Portland Trail Blazers	50	32	.610	7
7	x-San Antonio Spurs	50	32	.610	7
8	x-Oklahoma City Thunder	50	32	.610	7
9	Houston Rockets	42	40	.512	15
10	Memphis Grizzlies	40	42	.488	17
11	New Orleans Hornets	37	45	.451	20
12	Los Angeles Clippers	29	53	.354	28
13	Golden State Warriors	26	56	.317	31
14	Sacramento Kings	25	57	.305	32
15	Minnesota Timberwolves	15	67	.183	42

== Game log ==
=== Pre-season ===
2009 preseason game log
Total: 6–2
Preseason

Game	Date	Team	Score	High points	High rebounds	High assists	Location Attendance	Record
1	October 7	Golden State	W 118-101	Andrew Bynum (24)	Artest & Bryant (9)	Ron Artest (7)	Honda Center (Anaheim, CA); 13,156	1–0
2	October 9	Golden State	L 91-110	Andrew Bynum (19)	Andrew Bynum (6)	Lamar Odom (5)	The Forum (Inglewood, CA); 17,505	1–1
3	October 15	Sacramento	W 98-92	Andrew Bynum (24)	Bynum & Odom (8)	Bryant & Fisher (4)	Thomas & Mack Center (Las Vegas, NV); 14,741	2–1
4	October 17	Charlotte	W 91-87	Bynum & Powell (15)	Josh Powell (8)	Kobe Bryant (7)	Staples Center; 18,422	3–1
5	October 18	L.A. Clippers	W 114-108	Brown & Bynum (20)	Andrew Bynum (13)	Jordan Farmar (7)	Staples Center; 17,932	4–1
6	October 20	Golden State	W 113-107	Kobe Bryant (21)	Andrew Bynum (9)	Ron Artest (8)	Citizens Business Bank Arena (Ontario, CA); 10,410	5–1
7	October 22	Denver	W 106-89	Kobe Bryant (23)	Lamar Odom (9)	Artest & Walton (5)	Honda Center (Anaheim, CA); 15,206	6–1
8	October 23	Denver	L 105-119	Sasha Vujačić (18)	Lamar Odom (9)	Ron Artest (5)	San Diego Sports Arena (San Diego, CA); 13,586	6–2

2009–10 season schedule

=== Regular season ===
2009–10 game log
Total: 57–25 (Home: 34–7; Road: 23–18)
October: 1–1 (home: 1–1; road: 0–0)

Game	Date	Team	Score	High points	High rebounds	High assists	Location Attendance	Record
1	October 27	L.A. Clippers	W 99-92	Kobe Bryant (33)	Bynum & Odom (13)	Lamar Odom (5)	Staples Center; 18,997	1–0
2	October 30	Dallas	L 80-94	Kobe Bryant (20)	Andrew Bynum (10)	Lamar Odom (7)	Staples Center; 18,997	1–1

November: 12–2 (home: 9–1; road: 3–1)

Game	Date	Team	Score	High points	High rebounds	High assists	Location Attendance	Record
3	November 1	Atlanta	W 118-110	Kobe Bryant (41)	Lamar Odom (14)	Lamar Odom (8)	Staples Center; 18,997	2–1
4	November 3	@ Oklahoma City	W 101-98 (OT)	Kobe Bryant (31)	Andrew Bynum (10)	Ron Artest (6)	Ford Center; 18,203	3–1
5	November 4	@ Houston	W 103-102 (OT)	Kobe Bryant (41)	Andrew Bynum (17)	Andrew Bynum (5)	Toyota Center; 18,291	4–1
6	November 6	Memphis	W 114-98	Kobe Bryant (41)	D. J. Mbenga (13)	3 players tied (7)	Staples Center; 18,997	5–1
7	November 8	New Orleans	W 104-88	Kobe Bryant (28)	D. J. Mbenga (12)	Ron Artest (7)	Staples Center; 18,997	6–1
8	November 12	Phoenix	W 121-102	Kobe Bryant (29)	Andrew Bynum (15)	Jordan Farmar (8)	Staples Center; 18,997	7–1
9	November 13	@ Denver	L 79-105	Bryant & Bynum (19)	Andrew Bynum (15)	Ron Artest (6)	Pepsi Center; 19,141	7–2
10	November 15	Houston	L 91-101	Ron Artest (22)	Andrew Bynum (11)	Lamar Odom (6)	Staples Center; 18,997	7–3
11	November 17	Detroit	W 106-93	Kobe Bryant (40)	Andrew Bynum (12)	Lamar Odom (8)	Staples Center; 18,997	8–3
12	November 19	Chicago	W 108-93	Pau Gasol (24)	Pau Gasol (13)	Kobe Bryant (8)	Staples Center; 18,997	9–3
13	November 22	Oklahoma City	W 101-85	Kobe Bryant (26)	Bynum & Gasol (8)	Kobe Bryant (7)	Staples Center; 18,997	10–3
14	November 24	New York	W 100-90	Kobe Bryant (34)	Pau Gasol (16)	Lamar Odom (5)	Staples Center; 18,997	11–3
15	November 28	@ Golden State	W 130-97	Pau Gasol (22)	Pau Gasol (12)	Kobe Bryant (6)	Oracle Arena; 20,001	12–3
16	November 29	New Jersey	W 106-87	Kobe Bryant (30)	Pau Gasol (9)	Bryant & Gasol (7)	Staples Center; 18,997	13–3

December: 12–3 (home: 7–1; road: 5–2)

Game	Date	Team	Score	High points	High rebounds	High assists	Location Attendance	Record
17	December 1	New Orleans	W 110-99	Andrew Bynum (21)	Andrew Bynum (9)	Derek Fisher (7)	Staples Center; 18,997	14–3
18	December 4	Miami	W 108-107	Kobe Bryant (33)	Bynum & Gasol (8)	Ron Artest (5)	Staples Center; 18,997	15–3
19	December 6	Phoenix	W 108-88	Kobe Bryant (26)	Lamar Odom (8)	Ron Artest (5)	Staples Center; 18,997	16–3
20	December 9	Utah	W 101-77	Kobe Bryant (27)	Pau Gasol (12)	Kobe Bryant (8)	Staples Center; 18,997	17–3
21	December 11	Minnesota	W 104-92	Kobe Bryant (20)	Pau Gasol (20)	Pau Gasol (7)	Staples Center; 18,997	18–3
22	December 12	@ Utah	L 94-102	3 players tied (16)	Pau Gasol (20)	Bryant & Gasol (5)	EnergySolutions Arena; 19,911	18–4
23	December 15	@ Chicago	W 96-87	Kobe Bryant (42)	Pau Gasol (16)	Derek Fisher (5)	United Center; 21,416	19–4
24	December 16	@ Milwaukee	W 107-106 (OT)	Kobe Bryant (39)	Pau Gasol (22)	Bryant & Gasol (4)	Bradley Center; 16,309	20–4
25	December 19	@ New Jersey	W 103-84	Kobe Bryant (29)	Pau Gasol (14)	Pau Gasol (6)	Izod Center; 17,190	21–4
26	December 20	@ Detroit	W 93-81	Kobe Bryant (28)	Pau Gasol (11)	Ron Artest (9)	The Palace of Auburn Hills; 22,076	22–4
27	December 22	Oklahoma City	W 111-108	Kobe Bryant (40)	Pau Gasol (11)	Kobe Bryant (6)	Staples Center; 18,997	23–4
28	December 25	Cleveland	L 87-102	Kobe Bryant (35)	Kobe Bryant (9)	Kobe Bryant (8)	Staples Center; 18,997	23–5
29	December 26	@ Sacramento	W 112-103 (2OT)	Kobe Bryant (38)	Lamar Odom (15)	Bryant & Bynum (4)	ARCO Arena; 17,345	24–5
30	December 28	@ Phoenix	L 103-118	Kobe Bryant (34)	Lamar Odom (13)	Pau Gasol (5)	US Airways Center; 18,422	24–6
31	December 29	Golden State	W 124-118	Kobe Bryant (44)	Pau Gasol (12)	Kobe Bryant (11)	Staples Center; 18,997	25–6

January: 12–5 (home: 6–0; road: 6–5)

Game	Date	Team	Score	High points	High rebounds	High assists	Location Attendance	Record
32	January 1	Sacramento	W 109-108	Kobe Bryant (39)	Pau Gasol (16)	Kobe Bryant (5)	Staples Center; 18,997	26–6
33	January 3	Dallas	W 131-96	Jordan Farmar (24)	Lamar Odom (15)	Kobe Bryant (8)	Staples Center; 18,997	27–6
34	January 5	Houston	W 88-79	Andrew Bynum (24)	Lamar Odom (19)	Lamar Odom (9)	Staples Center; 18,997	28–6
35	January 6	@ L.A. Clippers	L 91-102	Kobe Bryant (33)	Lamar Odom (16)	Kobe Bryant (8)	Staples Center; 19,388	28–7
36	January 8	@ Portland	L 98-107	Kobe Bryant (32)	Lamar Odom (13)	Kobe Bryant (7)	Rose Garden; 20,629	28–8
37	January 10	Milwaukee	W 95-77	Shannon Brown (19)	Andrew Bynum (18)	Lamar Odom (9)	Staples Center; 18,997	29–8
38	January 12	@ San Antonio	L 85-105	Andrew Bynum (23)	Lamar Odom (12)	Lamar Odom (6)	AT&T Center; 18,581	29–9
39	January 13	@ Dallas	W 100-95	Andrew Bynum (22)	Lamar Odom (14)	Odom & Walton (4)	American Airlines Center; 20,491	30–9
40	January 15	L.A. Clippers	W 126-86	Kobe Bryant (30)	Derek Fisher (8)	Derek Fisher (6)	Staples Center; 18,997	31–9
41	January 18	Orlando	@ 98-92	Shannon Brown (22)	Lamar Odom (16)	Kobe Bryant (7)	Staples Center; 18,997	32–9
42	January 21	@ Cleveland	L 87-93	Kobe Bryant (31)	Gasol & Odom (10)	3 players tied (4)	Quicken Loans Arena; 20,562	32–10
43	January 22	@ New York	W 115-105	Kobe Bryant (27)	Lamar Odom (14)	Kobe Bryant (6)	Madison Square Garden; 19,763	33–10
44	January 24	@ Toronto	L 105-106	Kobe Bryant (27)	Kobe Bryant (16)	Kobe Bryant (9)	Air Canada Centre; 20,111	33–11
45	January 26	@ Washington	W 115-103	Bryant & Gasol (26)	Pau Gasol (10)	Kobe Bryant (8)	Verizon Center; 20,173	34–11
46	January 27	@ Indiana	W 118-96	Kobe Bryant (29)	Lamar Odom (14)	Kobe Bryant (7)	Conseco Fieldhouse; 18,165	35–11
47	January 29	@ Philadelphia	W 99-91	Kobe Bryant (24)	Pau Gasol (10)	Pau Gasol (5)	Wachovia Center; 20,809	36–11
48	January 31	@ Boston	W 90-89	Bryant & Bynum (19)	Bynum & Gasol (11)	Kobe Bryant (6)	TD Garden; 18,624	37–11

February: 8–4 (home: 5–2; road: 3–2)

Game	Date	Team	Score	High points	High rebounds	High assists	Location Attendance	Record
49	February 1	@ Memphis	L 93-95	Kobe Bryant (44)	Gasol & Odom (9)	Jordan Farmar (5)	FedExForum; 18,119	37–12
50	February 3	Charlotte	W 99-97	Lamar Odom (19)	Andrew Bynum (14)	Brown & Bryant (6)	Staples Center; 18,997	38–12
51	February 5	Denver	L 113-126	Kobe Bryant (33)	Pau Gasol (17)	Pau Gasol (6)	Staples Center; 18,997	38–13
52	February 6	@ Portland	W 99-82	Ron Artest (21)	Lamar Odom (22)	Fisher & Odom (6)	Rose Garden; 20,688	39–13
53	February 8	San Antonio	W 101-89	Pau Gasol (21)	Pau Gasol (19)	Pau Gasol (8)	Staples Center; 18,997	40–13
54	February 10	@ Utah	W 96-81	Lamar Odom (25)	Pau Gasol (19)	3 players tied (4)	EnergySolutions Arena; 19,911	41–13
All-Star Break
55	February 16	Golden State	W 104-94	Shannon Brown (27)	Lamar Odom (18)	Ron Artest (6)	Staples Center; 18,997	42–13
56	February 18	Boston	L 86-87	Pau Gasol (22)	Lamar Odom (14)	Shannon Brown (4)	Staples Center; 18,997	42–14
57	February 23	@ Memphis	W 99-98	Kobe Bryant (32)	Pau Gasol (13)	Kobe Bryant (6)	FedExForum; 18,119	43–14
58	February 24	@ Dallas	L 96-101	Lamar Odom (21)	Andrew Bynum (11)	Fisher & Odom (5)	American Airlines Center; 20,505	43–15
59	February 26	Philadelphia	W 99-90	Pau Gasol (23)	Andrew Bynum (13)	Kobe Bryant (8)	Staples Center; 18,997	44–15
60	February 28	Denver	W 95-89	Lamar Odom (20)	Pau Gasol (14)	Kobe Bryant (12)	Staples Center; 18,997	45–15

March: 9–6 (home: 4–0; road: 5–6)

Game	Date	Team	Score	High points	High rebounds	High assists	Location Attendance	Record
61	March 2	Indiana	W 122-99	Kobe Bryant (24)	Pau Gasol (16)	Lamar Odom (7)	Staples Center; 18,997	46–15
62	March 4	@ Miami	L 111-114 (OT)	Kobe Bryant (39)	Lamar Odom (11)	Kobe Bryant (4)	American Airlines Arena; 19,600	46–16
63	March 5	@ Charlotte	L 83-98	Kobe Bryant (26)	Pau Gasol (13)	Ron Artest (4)	Time Warner Cable Arena; 19,568	46–17
64	March 7	@ Orlando	L 94-96	Kobe Bryant (34)	Pau Gasol (11)	Kobe Bryant (7)	Amway Arena; 17,461	46–18
65	March 9	Toronto	W 109-107	Kobe Bryant (32)	Pau Gasol (9)	Kobe Bryant (6)	Staples Center; 18,997	47–18
66	March 12	@ Phoenix	W 102-96	Kobe Bryant (21)	Kobe Bryant (10)	Kobe Bryant (8)	US Airways Center; 18,422	48–18
67	March 15	@ Golden State	W 124-121	Kobe Bryant (29)	Andrew Bynum (14)	Artest & Fisher (5)	Oracle Arena; 20,038	49–18
68	March 16	@ Sacramento	W 106-99	Kobe Bryant (30)	Bynum & Gasol (12)	Kobe Bryant (7)	ARCO Arena; 17,361	50–18
69	March 19	Minnesota	W 104-96	Kobe Bryant (22)	Pau Gasol (14)	Kobe Bryant (13)	Staples Center; 18,997	51–18
70	March 21	Washington	W 99-92	Pau Gasol (28)	Lamar Odom (13)	Lamar Odom (6)	Staples Center; 18,997	52–18
71	March 24	@ San Antonio	W 92-83	Kobe Bryant (24)	Lamar Odom (13)	Kobe Bryant (6)	AT&T Center; 18,581	53–18
72	March 26	@ Oklahoma City	L 75-91	Lamar Odom (15)	Lamar Odom (7)	Kobe Bryant (3)	Ford Center; 18,203	53–19
73	March 27	@ Houston	W 109-101	Pau Gasol (30)	Lamar Odom (13)	Kobe Bryant (9)	Toyota Center; 18,583	54–19
74	March 29	@ New Orleans	L 100-108	Kobe Bryant (31)	Pau Gasol (22)	Kobe Bryant (6)	New Orleans Arena; 18,206	54–20
75	March 31	@ Atlanta	L 92-109	Kobe Bryant (28)	Pau Gasol (11)	Ron Artest (5)	Philips Arena; 20,190	54–21

April: 3–4 (home: 2–2; road: 1–2)

Game	Date	Team	Score	High points	High rebounds	High assists	Location Attendance	Record
76	April 2	Utah	W 106-92	Lamar Odom (26)	Pau Gasol (16)	Pau Gasol (9)	Staples Center; 18,997	55–21
77	April 4	San Antonio	L 81-100	Pau Gasol (32)	Lamar Odom (13)	Bryant & Gasol (6)	Staples Center; 18,997	55–22
78	April 8	@ Denver	L 96-98	Pau Gasol (26)	Gasol & Odom (13)	Pau Gasol (5)	Pepsi Center; 20,044	55–23
79	April 9	@ Minnesota	W 97-88	Pau Gasol (29)	Pau Gasol (15)	Jordan Farmar (5)	Target Center; 20,200	56–23
80	April 11	Portland	L 88-91	Pau Gasol (23)	Lamar Odom (15)	Ron Artest (6)	Staples Center; 18,997	56–24
81	April 13	Sacramento	W 106-100	Pau Gasol (28)	Lamar Odom (10)	Ron Artest (5)	Staples Center; 18,997	57–24
82	April 14	@ L.A. Clippers	L 91-107	Lamar Odom (21)	Pau Gasol (17)	Luke Walton (6)	Staples Center; 20,044	57–25

2009–10 season schedule

=== Playoffs ===
2010 playoff game log
Total: 16–7 (Home: 11–1; Road: 5–6)
First Round: 4–2 (home: 3–0; road: 1–2)

Game	Date	Team	Score	High points	High rebounds	High assists	Location Attendance	Series
1	April 18	Oklahoma City	W 87-79	Kobe Bryant (21)	Pau Gasol (12)	Bryant & Gasol (3)	Staples Center; 18,997	1–0
2	April 20	Oklahoma City	W 95-92	Kobe Bryant (39)	Pau Gasol (12)	Derek Fisher (6)	Staples Center; 18,997	2–0
3	April 22	@ Oklahoma City	L 96-101	Kobe Bryant (24)	Pau Gasol (15)	Kobe Bryant (8)	Ford Center; 18,342	2–1
4	April 24	@ Oklahoma City	L 89-110	Bynum & Gasol (13)	Andrew Bynum (10)	Kobe Bryant (4)	Ford Center; 18,342	2–2
5	April 27	Oklahoma City	W 111-87	Pau Gasol (25)	Bynum & Gasol (11)	Kobe Bryant (7)	Staples Center; 18,997	3–2
6	April 30	@ Oklahoma City	W 95-94	Kobe Bryant (32)	Pau Gasol (18)	Derek Fisher (6)	Ford Center; 18,342	4–2

Conference Semifinals: 4–0 (home: 2–0; road: 2–0)

Game	Date	Team	Score	High points	High rebounds	High assists	Location Attendance	Series
1	May 2	Utah	W 104-99	Kobe Bryant (31)	Gasol & Odom (12)	Bryant & Gasol (4)	Staples Center; 18,997	1–0
2	May 4	Utah	W 111-103	Kobe Bryant (30)	Gasol & Odom (15)	Kobe Bryant (8)	Staples Center; 18,997	2–0
3	May 8	@ Utah	W 111-110	Kobe Bryant (35)	Pau Gasol (17)	Kobe Bryant (7)	EnergySolutions Arena; 19,911	3–0
4	May 10	@ Utah	W 111-96	Pau Gasol (33)	Pau Gasol (14)	Kobe Bryant (4)	EnergySolutions Arena; 19,911	4–0

Conference Finals: 4–2 (home: 3–0; road: 1–2)

Game	Date	Team	Score	High points	High rebounds	High assists	Location Attendance	Series
1	May 17	Phoenix	W 128-107	Kobe Bryant (40)	Lamar Odom (19)	4 players tied (5)	Staples Center; 18,997	1–0
2	May 19	Phoenix	W 124-112	Pau Gasol (29)	Lamar Odom (11)	Kobe Bryant (13)	Staples Center; 18,997	2–0
3	May 23	@ Phoenix	L 109-118	Kobe Bryant (36)	Bryant & Gasol (9)	Kobe Bryant (11)	US Airways Center; 18,422	2–1
4	May 25	@ Phoenix	L 106-115	Kobe Bryant (38)	Lamar Odom (10)	Kobe Bryant (10)	US Airways Center; 18,422	2–2
5	May 27	Phoenix	W 103-101	Kobe Bryant (30)	Lamar Odom (13)	Kobe Bryant (9)	Staples Center; 18,997	3–2
6	May 29	@ Phoenix	W 111-103	Kobe Bryant (37)	Lamar Odom (12)	Jordan Farmar (5)	US Airways Center; 18,422	4–2

NBA Finals: 4–3 (home: 3–1; road: 1–2)

Game	Date	Team	Score	High points	High rebounds	High assists	Location Attendance	Series
1	June 3	Boston	W 102-89	Kobe Bryant (30)	Pau Gasol (14)	Kobe Bryant (6)	Staples Center; 18,997	1–0
2	June 6	Boston	L 94-103	Pau Gasol (25)	Pau Gasol (8)	Kobe Bryant (6)	Staples Center; 18,997	1–1
3	June 8	@ Boston	W 91-84	Kobe Bryant (29)	Bynum & Gasol (10)	Bryant & Gasol (4)	TD Garden; 18,624	2–1
4	June 10	@ Boston	L 89-96	Kobe Bryant (33)	Artest & Odom (7)	Artest & Gasol (3)	TD Garden; 18,624	2–2
5	June 13	@ Boston	L 86-92	Kobe Bryant (38)	Pau Gasol (12)	Kobe Bryant (4)	TD Garden; 18,624	2–3
6	June 15	Boston	W 89-67	Kobe Bryant (26)	Pau Gasol (13)	Pau Gasol (9)	Staples Center; 18,997	3–3
7	June 17	Boston	W 83-79	Kobe Bryant (23)	Pau Gasol (18)	Pau Gasol (4)	Staples Center; 18,997	4–3

2010 playoff schedule

== Player statistics ==
Legend
GP	Games played	GS	Games started	MPG	Minutes per game
FG%	Field goal percentage	3P%	3-point field goal percentage	FT%	Free throw percentage
RPG	Rebounds per game	APG	Assists per game	SPG	Steals per game
BPG	Blocks per game	PPG	Points per game	**Bold**	Career high

=== Season ===
Player	GP	GS	MPG	FG%	3P%	FT%	RPG	APG	SPG	BPG	PPG
**Ron Artest**	77	77	33.8	.414	.355	.688	4.3	3.0	1.4	0.3	11.0
Shannon Brown	82	7	20.7	.427	.328	.818	2.2	1.3	0.7	0.4	8.1
**Kobe Bryant**	73	73	38.8	.456	.329	.811	5.4	5.0	1.6	0.3	27.0
**Andrew Bynum**	65	65	30.4	.570	.000	.739	8.3	1.0	0.5	1.4	15.0
Jordan Farmar	82	0	18.0	.435	.376	.671	1.6	1.5	0.6	0.1	7.2
**Derek Fisher**	82	82	27.2	.380	.348	.856	2.1	2.5	1.1	0.1	7.5
**Pau Gasol**	65	65	37.0	.536	.000	.790	11.3	3.4	.6	1.7	18.3
D. J. Mbenga	49	2	7.2	.466	.000	.474	1.8	0.2	0.1	0.6	2.1
Adam Morrison	31	0	7.8	.376	.238	.625	1.0	0.6	0.1	0.1	2.4
Lamar Odom	82	38	31.5	.463	.319	.693	9.8	3.3	0.9	0.7	10.8
Josh Powell	63	0	9.2	.366	.438	.645	1.8	0.6	0.1	0.1	2.7
Sasha Vujačić	67	1	8.6	.402	.309	.848	1.2	0.6	0.3	0.1	2.8
Luke Walton	29	0	9.4	.357	.412	.500	1.3	1.4	0.3	0.0	2.4

=== Playoffs ===
Player	GP	GS	MPG	FG%	3P%	FT%	RPG	APG	SPG	BPG	PPG
**Ron Artest**	23	23	36.5	.398	.291	.579	4.0	2.1	1.5	.5	11.2
Shannon Brown	23	0	14.1	.393	.281	.714	1.3	.9	.4	.3	4.9
**Kobe Bryant**	23	23	40.1	.458	.374	.842	6.0	5.5	1.4	.7	29.2
**Andrew Bynum**	23	23	24.4	.537	.000	.679	6.9	.5	.3	1.6	8.6
Jordan Farmar	23	0	13.1	.404	.400	.692	1.2	1.4	.7	.0	4.6
**Derek Fisher**	23	23	32.5	.448	.360	.821	2.5	2.8	1.2	.0	10.3
**Pau Gasol**	23	23	39.7	.539	.000	.759	11.1	3.5	.4	2.1	19.6
D. J. Mbenga	3	0	4.0	.333	.000	1.000	1.7	.3	.0	.0	1.7
Adam Morrison	2	0	6.5	.444	.000	.000	2.5	.5	.0	.0	4.0
Lamar Odom	23	0	29.0	.469	.244	.600	8.6	2.0	.6	.9	9.7
Josh Powell	13	0	3.1	.375	.000	.750	.5	.1	.0	.0	.7
Sasha Vujačić	10	0	7.6	.435	.400	.833	.8	.5	.2	.0	3.1
Luke Walton	16	0	6.0	.304	.222	.500	.5	.9	.1	.1	1.1

== Awards and records ==
=== Awards ===
- Kobe Bryant was named to the All-NBA First Team
- Pau Gasol was named to the All-NBA Third Team
- Kobe Bryant was named to the NBA All-Defensive First Team
- The Los Angeles Lakers won the 2010 NBA Championship.
- Kobe Bryant was named the 2010 NBA Finals MVP.

==== All-Star ====
- Kobe Bryant was voted to his 12th consecutive NBA All-Star Game as a starter.
- Pau Gasol was selected to his third NBA All-Star Game.

==== Weekly/Monthly ====
- Kobe Bryant was named Western Conference Player of the Week for games played from November 16 through November 22.
- Kobe Bryant was named Western Conference Player of the Week for games played from December 14 to December 20.
- Kobe Bryant was named Western Conference Player of the Week for games played from December 21 to December 27.
- Kobe Bryant was named Western Conference Player of the Month for December.
- Pau Gasol was named Western Conference Player of the Week for games played from March 15 to March 21.

=== Records ===
- On November 6, Kobe Bryant moved past Allen Iverson into 16th place on the NBA's career scoring list.
- On November 6, Kobe Bryant became the youngest player (31 years, 75 days) in NBA history to score 24,000 points.
- On November 19, Kobe Bryant passed Kareem Abdul-Jabbar (24,276) for second place on the Lakers' career scoring list.
- On December 1, the Lakers tied the NBA record for most consecutive games (7) scoring at least 100 points and holding their opponent below 100, matching the mark set by the Milwaukee Bucks in January 2001.
- On January 5, Kobe Bryant moved past Patrick Ewing into 15th place on the NBA's career scoring list.
- On January 13, the Lakers became the first franchise in NBA history to win 3,000 games.
- On January 21, Kobe Bryant became the youngest player in NBA history to score 25,000 points.
- On February 1, Kobe Bryant moved past Jerry West into 14th place on the NBA's career scoring list. He also surpassed West to become the Lakers franchise scoring leader.
- On February 23, Kobe Bryant became the youngest player, at 31 years and 184 days, to play 1,000 games.
- On February 24, Kobe Bryant moved past Reggie Miller into 13th place on the NBA's career scoring list.
- On March 25, Kobe Bryant moved past Alex English into 12th place on the NBA's career scoring list.
- On May 2, Phil Jackson won his 103rd playoff game with the Lakers, passing Pat Riley for the franchise lead.
- On May 29, Kobe Bryant, with his 10th 30-point performance in his last 11 postseason games, moved ahead of Jerry West and into a tie with Kareem Abdul-Jabbar for second-most 30-point playoff games at 75.
- On May 29, Kobe Bryant extended his NBA record to eight straight 30-point closeout games on the road.
- On May 29, the Los Angeles Lakers extended their NBA record of most finals appearances to 31.
- On June 7, the Lakers set an NBA Finals record by blocking 14 shots in a game. Andrew Bynum had seven blocks and Pau Gasol had six as they became the first teammates in Finals history to each have five or more blocks in a game.
- Kobe Bryant became the first player to score 600 points in three consecutive playoff seasons.

== Transactions ==
Los Angeles Lakers
Players Added

Via Draft

- Chinemelu Elonu

Via Free Agency

- Ron Artest (From Rockets)
- Shannon Brown (Re-signed)
- Lamar Odom (Re-signed)
Players Lost

Via Trade

- Toney Douglas (To Knicks)
- Patrick Beverley (To Heat)

Via Free Agency

- Trevor Ariza (To Rockets)
