= 2009–10 Los Angeles Clippers season =

NBA professional basketball team season

- Head coach: Mike Dunleavy; Kim Hughes
- Owners: Donald Sterling
- Arena: Staples Center

Results
- Record: 29–53 (.354)
- Place: Division: 3rd (Pacific); Conference: 12th (Western)
- Playoff finish: Did not qualify
- Stats at Basketball Reference

Local media
- Television: Prime Ticket
- Radio: KFWB

The 2009–10 Los Angeles Clippers season was the 40th season of the franchise in the National Basketball Association (NBA).

The season saw the team draft Blake Griffin, but during a preseason game, he went down with a knee injury and was unable to play in what could have been his rookie season.

== Key dates ==
- June 25 – The 2009 NBA draft took place in New York City.
- July 8 – The free agency period started.

== Draft picks ==
Round	Pick	Player	Position	Nationality	College/Team
1	1	Blake Griffin	PF	United States	Oklahoma

== Roster ==
2009–10 Los Angeles Clippers roster
Players

Pos.	No.	Player	Height	Weight	DOB	From
G	2	Steve Blake	6 ft 3 in (1.91 m)	172 lb (78 kg)		Maryland
G	6	Bobby Brown	6 ft 2 in (1.88 m)	175 lb (79 kg)		Cal State Fullerton
G/F	45	Rasual Butler	6 ft 7 in (2.01 m)	205 lb (93 kg)		La Salle
G	25	Mardy Collins	6 ft 6 in (1.98 m)	220 lb (100 kg)		Temple
G	1	Baron Davis (injured)	6 ft 3 in (1.91 m)	215 lb (98 kg)		UCLA
F	0	Drew Gooden	6 ft 10 in (2.08 m)	250 lb (113 kg)		Kansas
G	10	Eric Gordon (IN)	6 ft 3 in (1.91 m)	222 lb (101 kg)		Indiana
F	32	Blake Griffin (injured) (IN)	6 ft 10 in (2.08 m)	251 lb (114 kg)		Oklahoma
F/C	9	DeAndre Jordan	6 ft 11 in (2.11 m)	250 lb (113 kg)		Texas A&M
C	35	Chris Kaman	7 ft 0 in (2.13 m)	265 lb (120 kg)		Central Michigan
F	20	Steve Novak	6 ft 10 in (2.08 m)	220 lb (100 kg)		Marquette
F	34	Travis Outlaw (injured)	6 ft 9 in (2.06 m)	207 lb (94 kg)		Starkville HS (MS)
F/C	8	Brian Skinner	6 ft 11 in (2.11 m)	215 lb (98 kg)		Baylor
F	5	Craig Smith (injured)	6 ft 7 in (2.01 m)	250 lb (113 kg)		Boston College

Coaches
Head coach
- Mike Dunleavy (South Carolina)
- Kim Hughes (interim) (Wisconsin)
Assistant(s)
- Tony Brown (Arkansas)
- Fred Vinson (Georgia Tech)
- John Lucas (Maryland)

Legend
- (DP) Unsigned draft pick
- (FA) Free agent
- (S) Suspended
- Injured

=== Roster notes ===
- Power forward Blake Griffin missed the entire season due to a left knee injury.
- Guard Kareem Rush becomes the 15th former Laker to play with the crosstown rival Clippers.

== Pre-season ==
2009 Pre-season game log: 0–0–0 (Home: 0–0–0; Road: 0–0–0)
#	Date	Visitor	Score	Home	OT	Decision	Attendance	Record	Recap
1	October 20	Maccabi Tel Aviv (Israel)		Los Angeles Clippers

== Regular season ==
=== Standings ===
Pacific Division	W	L	PCT	GB	Home	Road	Div
c-Los Angeles Lakers	57	25	.695	–	34–7	23–18	13–3
x-Phoenix Suns	54	28	.659	3	32–9	22–19	12–4
Los Angeles Clippers	29	53	.354	28	21–20	8–33	5–11
Golden State Warriors	26	56	.317	31	18–23	8–33	5–11
Sacramento Kings	25	57	.305	32	18–23	7–34	5–11

#	Western Conference				
#	Team	W	L	PCT	GB
1	c-Los Angeles Lakers	57	25	.695	–
2	y-Dallas Mavericks	55	27	.671	2
3	x-Phoenix Suns	54	28	.659	3
4	y-Denver Nuggets	53	29	.646	4
5	x-Utah Jazz	53	29	.646	4
6	x-Portland Trail Blazers	50	32	.610	7
7	x-San Antonio Spurs	50	32	.610	7
8	x-Oklahoma City Thunder	50	32	.610	7
9	Houston Rockets	42	40	.512	15
10	Memphis Grizzlies	40	42	.488	17
11	New Orleans Hornets	37	45	.451	20
12	Los Angeles Clippers	29	53	.354	28
13	Golden State Warriors	26	56	.317	31
14	Sacramento Kings	25	57	.305	32
15	Minnesota Timberwolves	15	67	.183	42

=== Game log ===
2009–10 game log
October: 0–4 (home: 0–2; road: 0–2)

Game	Date	Team	Score	High points	High rebounds	High assists	Location Attendance	Record
1	October 27	@ L. A. Lakers	L 92–99	Eric Gordon (21)	Chris Kaman (16)	Baron Davis (8)	Staples Center; 18,997	0–1
2	October 28	Phoenix	L 107–109	Marcus Camby (23)	Marcus Camby (11)	Baron Davis (12)	Staples Center; 15,974	0–2
3	October 30	@ Utah	L 98–111	Eric Gordon (22)	Marcus Camby (13)	Baron Davis (4)	EnergySolutions Arena; 19,911	0–3
4	October 31	Dallas	L 84–93	Chris Kaman (27)	Chris Kaman (11)	Baron Davis (6)	Staples Center; 13,626	0–4

November: 8–6 (home: 5–3; road: 3–3)

Game	Date	Team	Score	High points	High rebounds	High assists	Location Attendance	Record
5	November 2	Minnesota	W 93–90	Chris Kaman (25)	Marcus Camby (15)	Baron Davis (8)	Staples Center; 13,614	1–4
6	November 6	@ Golden State	W 118–90	Eric Gordon, Baron Davis (25)	Marcus Camby (12)	Baron Davis (7)	Oracle Arena; 18,788	2–4
7	November 7	Memphis	W 113–110	Chris Kaman (26)	Chris Kaman (9)	Eric Gordon (6)	Staples Center; 15,399	3–4
8	November 9	New Orleans	L 84–112	Chris Kaman, Rasual Butler, Ricky Davis (14)	Marcus Camby (11)	Baron Davis (8)	Staples Center; 14,760	3–5
9	November 11	Oklahoma City	L 79–83	Chris Kaman (20)	Chris Kaman (11)	Baron Davis (9)	Staples Center; 14,248	3–6
10	November 13	Toronto	L 89–104	Chris Kaman (25)	Chris Kaman, Craig Smith (7)	Baron Davis (7)	Staples Center; 15,615	3–7
11	November 15	@ Oklahoma City	W 101–93	Chris Kaman (25)	Marcus Camby (9)	Baron Davis (6)	Oklahoma City Arena; 17,715	4–7
12	November 17	@ New Orleans	L 102–110	Al Thornton (30)	Marcus Camby (14)	Baron Davis (9)	New Orleans Arena; 13,116	4–8
13	November 18	@ Memphis	L 91–106	Baron Davis (23)	Al Thornton, DeAndre Jordan (7)	Sebastian Telfair, Baron Davis (5)	FedEx Forum; 10,012	4–9
14	November 20	Denver	W 106–99	Rasual Butler (27)	Chris Kaman (7)	Baron Davis (9)	STAPLES Center; 18,155	5–9
15	November 23	Minnesota	W 91–87	Al Thornton (31)	Marcus Camby (18)	Baron Davis (6)	STAPLES Center; 13,815	6–9
16	November 25	@ Indiana	L 73–86	Baron Davis (25)	Marcus Camby (21)	Marcus Camby (3)	Conseco Fieldhouse; 12,356	6–10
17	November 27	@ Detroit	W 104–96	Chris Kaman (26)	Marcus Camby (9)	Baron Davis (10)	The Palace of Auburn Hills; 18,954	7–10
18	November 29	Memphis	W 98–88	Eric Gordon (29)	Marcus Camby (14)	Baron Davis (6)	Staples Center; 14,854	8–10

December: 6–8 (home: 4–3; road: 2–5)

Game	Date	Team	Score	High points	High rebounds	High assists	Location Attendance	Record
19	December 2	Houston	L 85–102	Baron Davis (20)	Marcus Camby (19)	Baron Davis (6)	Staples Center; 13,836	8–11
20	December 5	Indiana	W 88–72	Al Thornton (19)	Marcus Camby (17)	Marcus Camby (6)	Staples Center; 15,305	9–11
21	December 8	Orlando	L 86–97	Eric Gordon (21)	Marcus Camby (13)	Baron Davis (11)	Staples Center; 16,750	9–12
22	December 13	San Antonio	L 90–115	Baron Davis (20)	Chris Kaman (10)	Baron Davis (6)	Staples Center; 16,464	9–13
23	December 14	Washington	W 97–95	Eric Gordon (29)	Marcus Camby (15)	Baron Davis (12)	Staples Center; 14,511	10–13
24	December 16	@ Minnesota	W 120–95	Eric Gordon (25)	Marcus Camby (18)	Baron Davis (13)	Target Center; 12,526	11–13
25	December 18	@ New York	L 91–95	Chris Kaman (20)	Marcus Camby (13)	Baron Davis (4)	Madison Square Garden; 19,763	11–14
26	December 19	@ Philadelphia	W 112–107 (OT)	Chris Kaman (24)	Marcus Camby (22)	Baron Davis (13)	Wachovia Center; 13,752	12–14
27	December 21	@ San Antonio	L 87–103	Chris Kaman (23)	Chris Kaman (15)	Baron Davis, Sebastian Telfair (6)	AT&T Center; 17,451	12–15
28	December 22	@ Houston	L 99–108	Chris Kaman (29)	Marcus Camby (19)	Baron Davis (9)	Toyota Center; 17,128	12–16
29	December 25	@ Phoenix	L 93–124	Rasual Butler (22)	Chris Kaman (10)	Baron Davis (8)	US Airways Center; 16,709	12–17
30	December 27	Boston	W 92–90	Chris Kaman (27)	Chris Kaman (12)	Baron Davis (13)	Staples Center; 19,060	13–17
31	December 30	@ Portland	L 99–103	Chris Kaman (25)	Marcus Camby (11)	Baron Davis (11)	Rose Garden Arena; 20,505	13–18
32	December 31	Philadelphia	W 104–88	Chris Kaman (26)	Chris Kaman, Marcus Camby (10)	Baron Davis (7)	Staples Center; 15,257	14–18

January: 6–9 (home: 5–1; road: 1–8)

Game	Date	Team	Score	High points	High rebounds	High assists	Location Attendance	Record
33	January 4	Portland	W 105–95	Chris Kaman (20)	Marcus Camby (15)	Baron Davis (9)	Staples Center; 15,104	15–18
34	January 6	L. A. Lakers	W 102–91	Baron Davis (25)	Marcus Camby (14)	Baron Davis (10)	Staples Center; 19,388	16–18
35	January 10	Miami	W 94–84	Chris Kaman (22)	Marcus Camby (17)	Baron Davis (14)	Staples Center; 19,060	17–18
36	January 12	@ Memphis	L 102–104	Baron Davis (27)	Baron Davis (12)	Baron Davis (12)	FedEx Forum; 11,004	17–19
37	January 13	@ New Orleans	L 94–108	Baron Davis (19)	Marcus Camby (20)	Baron Davis (6)	New Orleans Arena; 14,348	17–20
38	January 15	@ Lakers	L 86–126	Craig Smith, Eric Gordon (17)	Marcus Camby (11)	Sebastian Telfair (11)	Staples Center; 18,997	17–21
39	January 16	Cleveland	L 101–102	Rasual Butler (33)	Marcus Camby (9)	Baron Davis (8)	Staples Center; 19,277	17–22
40	January 18	New Jersey	W 106–95	Chris Kaman (22)	Marcus Camby (14)	Baron Davis, Sebastian Telfair (9)	Staples Center; 14,533	18–22
41	January 20	Chicago	W 104–97	Baron Davis (23)	Marcus Camby (25)	Baron Davis, Ricky Davis (6)	Staples Center; 16,794	19–22
42	January 21	@ Denver	L 85–105	Craig Smith (21)	Craig Smith, Marcus Camby (6)	Baron Davis (9)	Pepsi Center; 15,343	19–23
43	January 24	@ Washington	W 92–78	Chris Kaman (20)	Marcus Camby (19)	Baron Davis (11)	Verizon Center; 12,356	20–23
44	January 25	@ Boston	L 89–95	Rasual Butler (17)	Marcus Camby (14)	Baron Davis (7)	TD Garden; 18,624	20–24
45	January 27	New Jersey	L 87–103	Chris Kaman (24)	Chris Kaman (11)	Bobby Brown (5)	Izod Center; 9,220	20–25
46	January 29	@ Minnesota	L 97–111	Baron Davis (28)	Marcus Camby (20)	Marcus Camby, Baron Davis (5)	Target Center; 13,398	20–26
47	January 31	@ Cleveland	L 89–114	Baron Davis (30)	DeAndre Jordan (13)	Baron Davis (7)	Quicken Loans Arena; 20,562	20–27

February: 4–8 (home: 3–3; road: 1–5)

Game	Date	Team	Score	High points	High rebounds	High assists	Location Attendance	Record
48	February 2	@ Chicago	W 90–82	Eric Gordon (24)	Chris Kaman (11)	Baron Davis (7)	United Center; 19,335	21–27
49	February 3	@ Atlanta	L 97–103	Chris Kaman, Eric Gordon (17)	Marcus Camby (20)	Marcus Camby, Baron Davis (6)	Philips Arena; 13,303	21–28
50	February 6	San Antonio	L 81–98	Chris Kaman (21)	Marcus Camby (12)	Baron Davis (9)	Staples Center; 18,258	21–29
51	February 9	Utah	L 99–109	Chris Kaman (19)	Marcus Camby (15)	Baron Davis (9)	Staples Center; 15,467	21–30
52	February 10	@ Golden State	L 102–132	Al Thornton (18)	DeAndre Jordan, Marcus Camby (8)	Baron Davis (7)	Oracle Arena; 17,230	21–31
53	February 16	@ Portland	L 87–109	Eric Gordon (20)	DeAndre Jordan (11)	Bobby Brown (5)	Rose Garden Arena; 20,265	21–32
54	February 17	Atlanta	L 92–110	Chris Kaman (21)	Chris Kaman (10)	Steve Blake (9)	Staples Center; 15,485	21–33
55	February 20	Sacramento	W 99–89	Eric Gordon (30)	Chris Kaman (16)	Steve Blake (12)	Staples Center; 17,903	22–33
56	February 22	Charlotte	W 98–94	Rasual Butler (20)	Chris Kaman (13)	Baron Davis (10)	Staples Center; 15,892	23–33
57	February 24	Detroit	W 97–91	Chris Kaman (21)	Chris Kaman (15)	Baron Davis (7)	Staples Center; 16,095	24–33
58	February 26	@ Phoenix	L 112–125	Eric Gordon (25)	Drew Gooden (9)	Steve Blake (9)	US Airways Center; 18,043	24–34
59	February 28	@ Sacramento	L 92–97	Chris Kaman (18)	Chris Kaman (11)	Baron Davis (8)	Power Balance Pavilion; 13,071	24–35

March: 3–13 (home: 2–5; road: 1–8)

Game	Date	Team	Score	High points	High rebounds	High assists	Location Attendance	Record
60	March 1	Utah	W 108–104	Eric Gordon (24)	Chris Kaman (14)	Baron Davis (12)	Staples Center; 15,422	25–35
61	March 3	Phoenix	L 101–127	Chris Kaman (24)	Chris Kaman (9)	Baron Davis (11)	Staples Center; 17,455	25–36
62	March 5	Oklahoma City	L 87–104	Chris Kaman, Craig Smith (19)	Chris Kaman (15)	Baron Davis (6)	Staples Center; 18,497	25–37
63	March 6	@ Utah	L 85–107	Drew Gooden (20)	Chris Kaman (13)	Baron Davis (8)	EnergySolutions Arena; 19,911	25–38
64	March 9	@ Orlando	L 87–113	Baron Davis (16)	Drew Gooden (14)	Baron Davis (9)	Amway Arena; 17,461	25–39
65	March 10	@ Miami	L 97–108	Rasual Butler (31)	Drew Gooden (9)	Baron Davis (9)	AmericanAirlines Arena; 14,785	25–40
66	March 12	@ Charlotte	L 98–106	Baron Davis (24)	Chris Kaman (11)	Steve Blake (9)	Time Warner Cable Arena; 15,835	25–41
67	March 13	@ San Antonio	L 88–118	Baron Davis (24)	Chris Kaman (11)	Steve Blake (9)	AT&T Center; 18,581	25–42
68	March 15	New Orleans	L 100–108	Rasual Butler (19)	DeAndre Jordan (11)	Baron Davis (17)	Staples Center; 15,617	25–43
69	March 17	Milwaukee	W 101–93	Chris Kaman (20)	Drew Gooden (11)	Steve Blake (8)	Staples Center; 15,241	26–43
70	March 21	Sacramento	L 89–102	Eric Gordon (23)	Chris Kaman (9)	Steve Blake (6)	Staples Center; 17,233	26–44
71	March 23	@ Dallas	L 96–106	Drew Gooden (26)	Drew Gooden (20)	Baron Davis (13)	American Airlines Center; 19,705	26–45
72	March 25	@ Houston	W 99–93	Craig Smith (25)	Drew Gooden (14)	Baron Davis (8)	Toyota Center; 15,201	27–45
73	March 28	Golden State	L 103–121	Rasual Butler (21)	Chris Kaman (13)	Baron Davis (7)	Staples Center; 17,868	27–46
74	March 30	@ Milwaukee	L 89–107	Drew Gooden (20)	DeAndre Jordan (13)	Eric Gordon, Steve Blake (6)	Bradley Center; 14,321	27–47
75	March 31	@ Toronto	L 92–114	Chris Kaman (22)	Chris Kaman (13)	Steve Blake (12)	Air Canada Centre; 16,106	27–48

April: 2–5 (home: 2–3; road: 0–2)

Game	Date	Team	Score	High points	High rebounds	High assists	Location Attendance	Record
76	April 3	@ Denver	L 90–98	Eric Gordon (23)	Chris Kaman (11)	Steve Blake (8)	Pepsi Center; 19,155	27–49
77	April 4	New York	L 107–113	Baron Davis (23)	Chris Kaman (16)	Baron Davis (11)	Staples Center; 16,083	27–50
78	April 7	Portland	L 85–93	Rasual Butler, Chris Kaman, Steve Blake (14)	DeAndre Jordan (11)	Baron Davis (8)	Staples Center; 16,790	27–51
79	April 8	@ Sacramento	L 94–116	Chris Kaman (23)	DeAndre Jordan (10)	Baron Davis (10)	Power Balance Pavilion; 11,418	27–52
80	April 10	Golden State	W 107–104	Chris Kaman (27)	DeAndre Jordan (15)	Steve Blake (9)	Staples Center; 17,476	28–52
81	April 12	Dallas	L 94–117	Chris Kaman (17)	DeAndre Jordan (13)	Steve Blake (13)	Staples Center; 17,838	28–53
82	April 14	Lakers	W 107–91	Steve Blake (23)	Steve Blake, Travis Outlaw (10)	Steve Blake (11)	Staples Center; 20,044	29–53

2009–10 season schedule

== Player statistics ==
Legend
GP	Games played	GS	Games started	MPG	Minutes per game
FG%	Field-goal percentage	3P%	3-point field-goal percentage	FT%	Free-throw percentage
RPG	Rebounds per game	APG	Assists per game	SPG	Steals per game
BPG	Blocks per game	PPG	Points per game

=== Regular season ===
Player	GP	GS	MPG	FG%	3P%	FT%	RPG	APG	SPG	BPG	PPG
Steve Blake	29	10	26.3	.443	.437	.750	2.4	6.1	.7	.1	6.8
Bobby Brown	23	0	8.3	.329	.281	.714	.9	1.8	.3	.0	3.0
Rasual Butler	82	64	33.0	.409	.336	.841	2.9	1.4	.4	.8	11.9
Marcus Camby	51	51	31.3	.446	.333	.659	12.1	3.0	1.4	1.9	7.7
Mardy Collins	43	0	10.9	.367	.235	.619	1.2	1.0	.5	.0	2.6
JamesOn Curry	1	0	0.0	.	.	.	.0	.0	.0	.0	.0
Baron Davis	75	73	33.6	.406	.277	.821	3.5	8.0	1.7	.6	15.3
Ricky Davis	36	2	13.9	.434	.381	.581	1.6	1.1	.3	.1	4.4
Drew Gooden	24	22	30.2	.492	.000	.921	9.4	.9	.6	.3	14.8
Eric Gordon	62	60	36.0	.449	.371	.742	2.6	3.0	1.1	.2	16.9
DeAndre Jordan	70	12	16.2	.605	.000	.375	5.0	.3	.2	.9	4.8
Chris Kaman	76	76	34.3	.490	.000	.749	9.3	1.6	.5	1.2	18.5
Steve Novak	54	0	6.7	.389	.310	.778	.6	.1	.1	.0	2.1
Travis Outlaw	23	6	21.7	.400	.378	.800	3.6	1.1	.5	.4	8.7
Kareem Rush	7	0	8.3	.364	.333	.	.9	.6	.3	.4	1.3
Brian Skinner	16	1	7.7	.400	.	.750	1.7	.0	.2	.3	1.6
Craig Smith	75	2	16.4	.569	.200	.635	3.8	1.1	.4	.3	7.8
Sebastian Telfair	39	1	14.9	.404	.234	.774	1.1	2.9	.6	.1	4.3
Al Thornton	51	30	27.5	.478	.357	.741	3.8	1.2	.5	.4	10.7

== Awards, records and milestones ==
=== Awards ===
==== All-Star ====
- Chris Kaman selected as a reserve center for the Western Conference All-Stars. Kaman was chosen as a replacement for the injured Brandon Roy on the roster.

== Injuries and surgeries ==
Player	Injury Date	Injury Type
Blake Griffin	October 23, 2009	Stress fracture in left knee (out for the season)
Kareem Rush	November 18, 2009	ACL tear in right knee (out for the season)

== Transactions ==
=== Trades ===
July 17, 2009
To Los Angeles Clippers

Quentin Richardson

To Memphis Grizzlies

Zach Randolph

July 20, 2009
To Los Angeles Clippers

Mark Madsen

Craig Smith

Sebastian Telfair
To Minnesota Timberwolves

Quentin Richardson

August 12, 2009
To Los Angeles Clippers

Rasual Butler

To New Orleans Hornets

2016 2nd-round draft pick

January 26, 2010
To Los Angeles Clippers

Bobby Brown

To New Orleans Hornets

2014 2nd-round draft pick

February 16, 2010
To Los Angeles Clippers

Steve Blake

Travis Outlaw
To Portland Trail Blazers

Marcus Camby

February 17, 2010
To Los Angeles Clippers

Drew Gooden (from Washington)

To Cleveland Cavaliers

Sebastian Telfair (from Los Angeles)

Antawn Jamison (from Washington)
To Washington Wizards

Al Thornton (from Los Angeles)

Zydrunas Ilgauskas (from Cleveland)

Draft rights to Emir Preldžič (from Cleveland)

2010 first-round draft pick (from Cleveland)

=== Free agents ===
==== Re-signed ====
Player	Signed	Contract
Steve Novak	September 12, 2009	One-year deal
Brian Skinner	September 17, 2009	One-year deal

==== Additions ====
Player	Signed	Former Team
Kareem Rush	September 30, 2009	Philadelphia 76ers
JamesOn Curry	January 22, 2010	Springfield Armor (NBDL)

==== Subtractions ====
Player	Reason Left	New Team
Jason Williams	Released, July 24	Orlando Magic
Mike Taylor	Waived, July 31	Memphis Grizzlies
Alex Acker	Free Agency, August 1	Olimpia Milano (Lega Basket Serie A)
Fred Jones	Free Agency, August 1	Pallacanestro Biella (Serie A2 Basket)
Mark Madsen	Waived, August 21	Utah Flash (NBDL) (assistant coach)
Kareem Rush	Waived, January 22	Detroit Pistons
JamesOn Curry	Waived, January 26	Springfield Armor (NBDL)
Ricky Davis	Waived, February 16	Türk Telekom B.K. (TBL)
