= D. J. Mbenga =

Belgian-Congolese basketball player (born 1980)

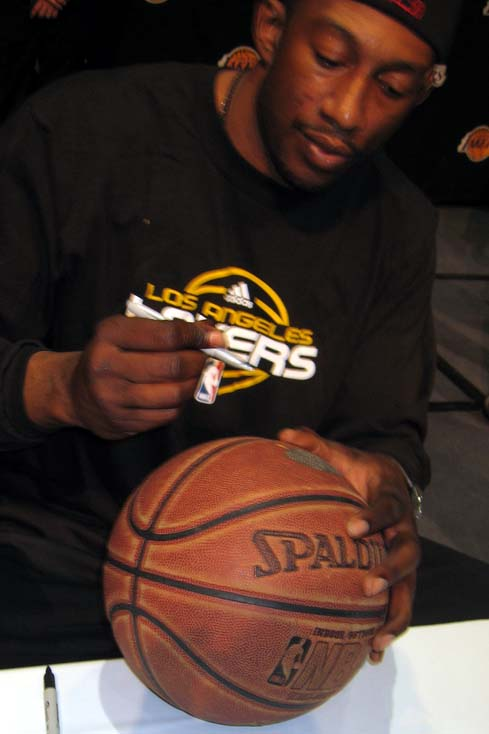
- Mbenga with the Los Angeles Lakers in 2010

Personal information
- Born: December 30, 1980 (age 45) Kinshasa, Zaire (now DR Congo)
- Listed height: 7 ft 0 in (2.13 m)
- Listed weight: 245 lb (111 kg)

Career information
- NBA draft: 2002: undrafted
- Playing career: 2001–2013
- Position: Center
- Number: 28

Career history
- 2001–2002: Spirou Gilly
- 2002–2003: Leuven Bears
- 2003–2004: Spirou Charleroi
- 2004–2007: Dallas Mavericks
- 2007–2008: Golden State Warriors
- 2008–2010: Los Angeles Lakers
- 2010–2011: New Orleans Hornets
- 2012: Qingdao DoubleStar
- 2013: Barako Bull Energy

Career highlights
- 2× NBA champion (2009, 2010); Belgian League champion (2004)
- Stats at NBA.com
- Stats at Basketball Reference

Didier "D. J." Ilunga-Mbenga (ben-ga; born December 30, 1980) is a Belgian-Congolese former professional basketball player. He has also played for the Belgian national basketball team as he is a dual citizen of both his native countries.

== Early life ==
Mbenga was born and raised in Kinshasa, Zaire, now known as the Democratic Republic of the Congo, where his father was a government employee. When a new regime took over power, it sought out everyone who worked for the previous leader. As unrest in the country escalated, Mbenga and his family were imprisoned. While his father was eventually unable to save himself, he did manage to negotiate on behalf of his wife and son, as Mbenga and his mother escaped the nation and were given asylum in Belgium. While living in a refugee center, he was discovered by Belgian basketball legend Willy Steveniers, who eventually served as Mbenga's personal basketball mentor.

== Professional career ==
=== Spirou Gilly (2001–2002) ===
In 2001, Mbenga joined Spirou Gilly of the Belgian Division II league where he made his professional debut in 2001–02.

=== Leuven Bears (2002–2003) ===
In 2002, Mbenga joined the Leuven Bears of the Belgian Basketball League for the 2002–03 season where in 21 games he averaged 8.1 points per game.

=== Spirou Charleroi (2003–2004) ===
In 2003, Mbenga joined Spirou Charleroi also of the Belgian Basketball League for the 2003–04 season where he played both league games and ULEB Cup games.

=== Dallas Mavericks (2004–2007) ===
On July 14, 2004, Mbenga signed a two-year, $3.4 million contract with the Dallas Mavericks and joined them for the 2004 NBA Summer League. During an injury-riddled first season with the Mavericks in 2004–05, he managed to play just 15 games while averaging just one point per game.

In July 2005, Mbenga re-joined the Dallas Mavericks for the 2005 NBA Summer League, and went on to play in 43 regular season games for the franchise in 2005–06. During the 2006 Western Conference Finals against the Phoenix Suns, Mbenga was suspended for six games for going into the stands, after he saw the wife of coach Avery Johnson being harassed by fans. He went on to manage seven playoff games in the Mavericks' playoff run that ended in Game 6 of the NBA Finals where they lost to the Miami Heat.

On June 30, 2006, the Mavericks extended a qualifying offer to Mbenga in order to make him a restricted free agent. After again playing for the Mavericks in the 2006 NBA Summer League, Mbenga re-signed with the franchise to a three-year, non-guaranteed contract on July 13, 2006. However, he managed just 21 games in 2006–07 after suffering a torn right ACL on February 7, 2007. He returned to the court on October 23, 2007, in the Mavericks' preseason finale against the Chicago Bulls where he recorded 5 rebounds, 2 blocks and 1 assist in 12 minutes of action. A week later, he was waived by the Mavericks.

=== Golden State Warriors (2007–2008) ===
On November 17, 2007, Mbenga signed with the Golden State Warriors. On January 6, 2008, he was waived by the Warriors.

=== Los Angeles Lakers (2008–2010) ===
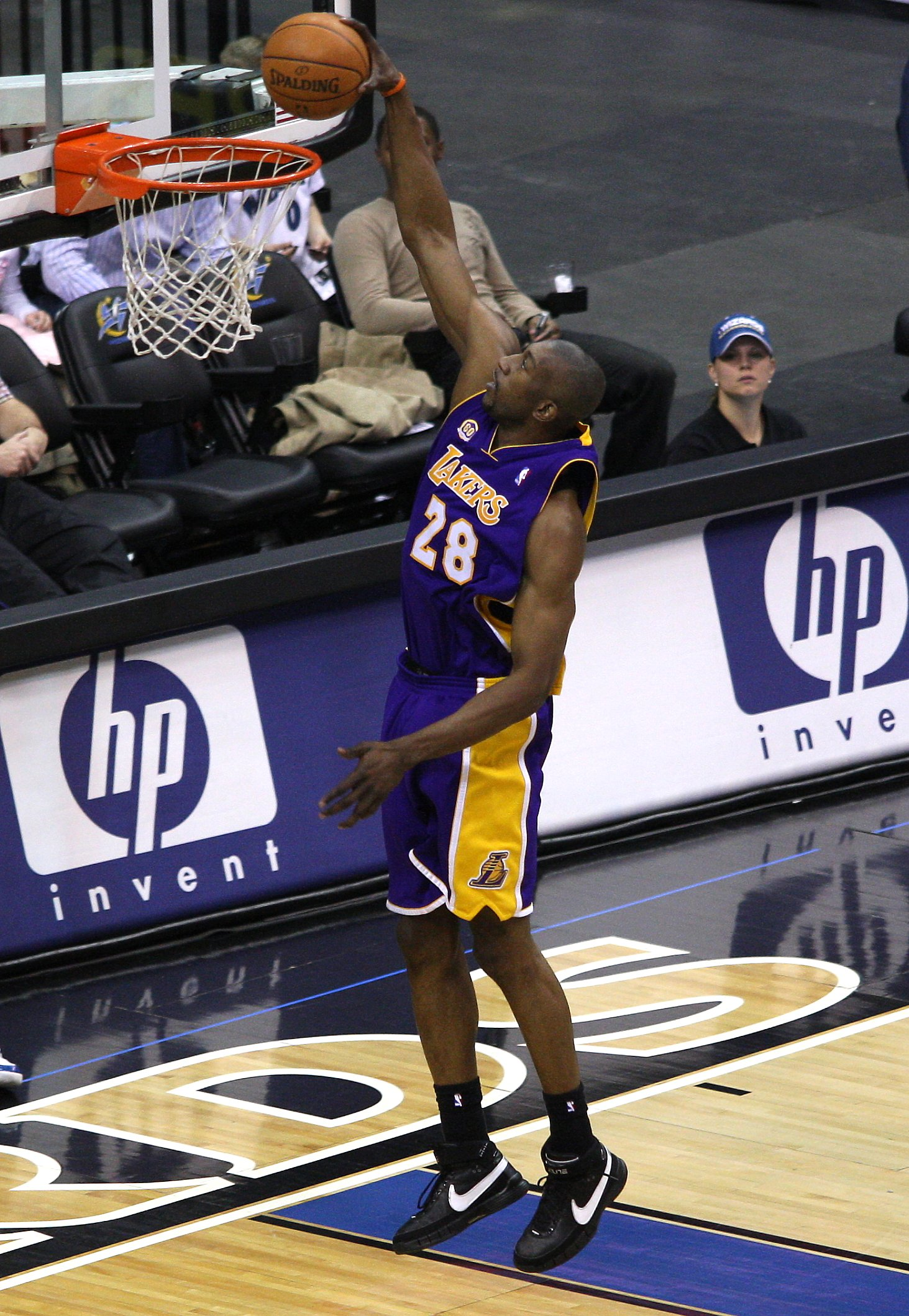
Mbenga jumps for a dunk in 2008

On January 21, 2008, Mbenga signed a 10-day contract with the Los Angeles Lakers. On February 1, 2008, he signed a second 10-day contract with the Lakers. On February 11, 2008, he signed with the Lakers for the rest of the 2007–08 season. On September 24, 2008, he re-signed with the Lakers.

On March 6, 2009, Mbenga recorded a then career high 10 points on 4–5 shooting, along with 4 rebounds and 5 blocks, in a 110–90 win over the Minnesota Timberwolves. The Lakers went on to win the 2009 NBA championship after they defeated the Orlando Magic 4 games to 1 in the 2009 NBA Finals.

With starting forward Pau Gasol and center Andrew Bynum injured, Mbenga made his first start for the Lakers on November 6, 2009, in a 114–98 win over the Memphis Grizzlies. Two days later, Mbenga recorded his first career double-double with 10 points and 12 rebounds, in addition to 4 blocks, in a 104–88 win over the New Orleans Hornets. On April 9, 2010, he recorded a career high 11 points in a 97–88 win over the Minnesota Timberwolves. Mbenga went on to win his second NBA championship after the Lakers defeated the Boston Celtics 4 games to 3 in the 2010 NBA Finals.

=== New Orleans Hornets (2010–2011) ===
On October 13, 2010, Mbenga signed a one-year deal with the New Orleans Hornets.

Mbenga's final NBA game ever was played in Game 6 of the 2011 Western Conference First Round against his former team the Los Angeles Lakers on April 28, 2011. The Hornets loss the game 80 - 98 (and lost the series 4 - 2) with Mbenga recording 2 rebounds, 1 assist and 1 steal.

=== Qingdao Eagles (2012) ===
In July 2012, Mbenga joined the Milwaukee Bucks for the 2012 NBA Summer League. On September 27, 2012, he signed with the Dallas Mavericks. However, he was later waived by the Mavericks on October 2, 2012.

In November 2012, Mbenga signed with Qingdao Eagles of the Chinese Basketball Association. On December 12, 2012, he played his final game for Qingdao before being replaced in the line-up by Chris Daniels.

=== Barako Bull Energy (2013) ===
On April 3, 2013, Mbenga signed with the Barako Bull Energy of the Philippine Basketball Association.

On October 8, 2014, Mbenga signed with the New York Knicks. However, he was later waived by the Knicks on October 24, 2014.

== NBA career statistics ==
Legend
GP	Games played	GS	Games started	MPG	Minutes per game
FG%	Field goal percentage	3P%	3-point field goal percentage	FT%	Free throw percentage
RPG	Rebounds per game	APG	Assists per game	SPG	Steals per game
BPG	Blocks per game	PPG	Points per game	**Bold**	Career high
†	Won an NBA championship

=== Regular season ===
Year	Team	GP	GS	MPG	FG%	3P%	FT%	RPG	APG	SPG	BPG	PPG
2004–05	Dallas	15	1	3.9	.429	.000	.750	.5	.0	.0	.3	1.0
2005–06	Dallas	43	1	5.5	**.533**	.000	.500	1.3	.0	.1	.6	1.7
2006–07	Dallas	21	0	3.8	.313	.000	**.875**	.5	.3	.1	.2	.8
2007–08	Golden State	16	0	**8.1**	.391	.000	.500	1.9	.3	.2	.6	1.2
2007–08	L.A. Lakers	26	0	7.5	.492	.000	.400	1.6	.2	.2	.6	2.5
2008–09†	L.A. Lakers	23	0	7.9	.474	.000	**.875**	1.3	**.4**	**.4**	**1.0**	**2.7**
2009–10†	L.A. Lakers	**49**	**2**	7.2	.466	.000	.474	1.8	.2	.1	.6	1.8
2010–11	New Orleans	41	0	8.0	.469	.000	.722	**2.1**	.1	.1	.7	1.4
Career		234	4	6.7	.470	.000	.607	1.5	.2	.2	.6	1.8

=== Playoffs ===
Year	Team	GP	GS	MPG	FG%	3P%	FT%	RPG	APG	SPG	BPG	PPG
2006	Dallas	**7**	0	3.6	.333	.000	**1.000**	1.1	.0	.0	.1	.6
2008	L.A. Lakers	**7**	0	4.3	.625	.000	.000	1.3	.0	.3	.1	1.4
2009†	L.A. Lakers	**7**	0	2.3	.167	.000	.000	.4	.0	.0	.3	.3
2010†	L.A. Lakers	3	0	4.0	.333	.000	**1.000**	**1.7**	**.3**	.0	.0	**1.7**
2011	New Orleans	5	0	**5.2**	**1.000**	.000	.500	1.0	.2	**.4**	**.6**	1.0
Career		29	0	3.7	.440	.000	.800	1.0	.1	.1	.2	.9

== Personal life ==
Mbenga speaks five languages: French, Portuguese, English, Lingala and Tshiluba.

In 2005, Mbenga started the Mbenga Foundation with the goal to help children in the Democratic Republic of Congo and refugees in Belgium.

== See also ==
- List of European basketball players in the United States
- List of people banned or suspended by the NBA
