= 2009–10 Phoenix Suns season =

Professional basketball season

- Head coach: Alvin Gentry
- President: Steve Kerr
- General manager: Steve Kerr
- Owner: Robert Sarver
- Arena: US Airways Center

Results
- Record: 54–28 (.659)
- Place: Division: 2nd (Pacific); Conference: 3rd (Western)
- Playoff finish: Western Conference Finals (lost to Lakers 2–4)
- Stats at Basketball Reference

Local media
- Television: Fox Sports Arizona, KUTP
- Radio: KTAR

The 2009–10 Phoenix Suns season was the 42nd season of the franchise in the National Basketball Association (NBA). Head coach Alvin Gentry (who coached the Suns the final 31 games of the previous season) was looking to reinstill in the Suns their offensive tendencies of seasons past: using the strengths of Steve Nash and Amar'e Stoudemire. A season-and-a-half experiment with Shaquille O'Neal ended in the summer before the season. With this subtraction and the retention of Jason Richardson, the Suns were primed for a return to the playoffs after a one-season absence. Phoenix would be the only team in the league to post a three-point field goal percentage of 40% or more while leading the NBA in scoring at 110 points per contest. They would return to the playoffs, defeating the Portland Trail Blazers in six games in the First Round and sweeping the rivaled San Antonio Spurs in four games in the Semifinals. Returning to the Western Conference Finals for the first time in four seasons, the Suns met the top-seeded Los Angeles Lakers, but lost the series in six games to the defending and eventual NBA champions. The Suns had the best team offensive rating in the NBA.

Following the season, Stoudemire signed as a free agent with the New York Knicks, and General Manager Steve Kerr left to return as a commentator for TNT.

This would be the last time the Suns reached the playoffs until their 2020–21 season, ending the second-longest active NBA post-season appearance drought at that time.

== Key dates ==
- June 25 – The 2009 NBA draft took place in New York City.
- July 8 – The free agency period started.

== Offseason ==
=== NBA draft ===
| Round | Pick | Player | Position | Nationality | College / Club |
|---|---|---|---|---|---|
| 1 | 14 | Earl Clark | Forward | United States | Louisville |
| 2 | 48 | Taylor Griffin | Forward | United States | Oklahoma |
| 2 | 57 | Emir Preldžič | Forward | Slovenia / Turkey | (Turkey) Fenerbahçe Ülker |

== Roster ==
2009–10 Phoenix Suns roster
Players

| Pos. | No. | Player | Height | Weight | DOB | From |
|---|---|---|---|---|---|---|
| PF | 17 | Louis Amundson | 6 ft 9 in (2.06 m) | 238 lb (108 kg) | 1982-12-07 | UNLV |
| G | 10 | Leandro Barbosa | 6 ft 3 in (1.91 m) | 202 lb (92 kg) | 1982-11-28 | Brazil |
| F | 55 | Earl Clark | 6 ft 10 in (2.08 m) | 225 lb (102 kg) | 1988-01-17 | Louisville |
| C | 20 | Jarron Collins | 6 ft 11 in (2.11 m) | 249 lb (113 kg) | 1978-12-02 | Stanford |
| G | 2 | Goran Dragić | 6 ft 3 in (1.91 m) | 190 lb (86 kg) | 1986-05-06 | Slovenia |
| F | 3 | Jared Dudley | 6 ft 7 in (2.01 m) | 225 lb (102 kg) | 1985-07-10 | Boston College |
| F/C | 8 | Channing Frye | 6 ft 11 in (2.11 m) | 245 lb (111 kg) | 1983-05-17 | Arizona |
| SF | 32 | Taylor Griffin | 6 ft 7 in (2.01 m) | 238 lb (108 kg) | 1986-04-18 | Oklahoma |
| SF | 33 | Grant Hill | 6 ft 8 in (2.03 m) | 225 lb (102 kg) | 1972-10-05 | Duke |
| F/C | 21 | Dwayne Jones | 6 ft 11 in (2.11 m) | 251 lb (114 kg) | 1983-06-09 | Saint Joseph's |
| C | 15 | Robin Lopez | 7 ft 0 in (2.13 m) | 255 lb (116 kg) | 1988-04-01 | Stanford |
| PG | 13 | Steve Nash | 6 ft 3 in (1.91 m) | 178 lb (81 kg) | 1974-02-07 | Santa Clara |
| G/F | 23 | Jason Richardson | 6 ft 6 in (1.98 m) | 225 lb (102 kg) | 1981-01-20 | Michigan State |
| F/C | 1 | Amar'e Stoudemire | 6 ft 10 in (2.08 m) | 249 lb (113 kg) | 1982-11-16 | Cypress Creek HS (FL) |

Coaches
Head coach
- Alvin Gentry
Assistant(s)
- Bill Cartwright
- Igor Kokoškov
- Dan Majerle
- John Shumate

Legend
- (DP) Unsigned draft pick
- (FA) Free agent
- (S) Suspended
- Injured

Roster
Updated: April 5, 2010

=== Roster notes ===
- Small forward Taylor Griffin only played 8 games and didn't play for the majority of the season and the playoffs.

== Pre-season ==
2009 Pre-season game log: 4–4–0 (home: 1–2–0; road: 3–2–0)
| # | Date | Visitor | Score | Home | OT | Attendance | Record | Recap |
| 1 | October 6 | Partizan Belgrade (Serbia) | 111–80 | Phoenix Suns |
| 2 | October 10 (in Indian Wells, California) | Phoenix Suns | 101–104 | Golden State Warriors |
| 3 | October 12 | Phoenix Suns | 105–110 | Oklahoma City Thunder |
| 4 | October 14 | Phoenix Suns | 110–104 | Portland Trail Blazers |
| 5 | October 16 | Philadelphia 76ers | 115–113 | Phoenix Suns |
| 6 | October 18 (in Monterrey, Mexico) | Philadelphia 76ers | 94–116 | Phoenix Suns |
| 7 | October 20 | Sacramento Kings | 143–127 | Phoenix Suns |
| 8 | October 22 (in Vancouver, BC) | Portland Trail Blazers | 93–113 | Phoenix Suns |

== Regular season ==
=== Standings ===
| Pacific Division | W | L | PCT | GB | Home | Road | Div |
|---|---|---|---|---|---|---|---|
| c-Los Angeles Lakers | 57 | 25 | .695 | – | 34–7 | 23–18 | 13–3 |
| x-Phoenix Suns | 54 | 28 | .659 | 3 | 32–9 | 22–19 | 12–4 |
| Los Angeles Clippers | 29 | 53 | .354 | 28 | 21–20 | 8–33 | 5–11 |
| Golden State Warriors | 26 | 56 | .317 | 31 | 18–23 | 8–33 | 5–11 |
| Sacramento Kings | 25 | 57 | .305 | 32 | 18–23 | 7–34 | 5–11 |

| # | Western Conference | | | | |
| # | Team | W | L | PCT | GB |
|---|---|---|---|---|---|
| 1 | c-Los Angeles Lakers | 57 | 25 | .695 | – |
| 2 | y-Dallas Mavericks | 55 | 27 | .671 | 2 |
| 3 | x-Phoenix Suns | 54 | 28 | .659 | 3 |
| 4 | y-Denver Nuggets | 53 | 29 | .646 | 4 |
| 5 | x-Utah Jazz | 53 | 29 | .646 | 4 |
| 6 | x-Portland Trail Blazers | 50 | 32 | .610 | 7 |
| 7 | x-San Antonio Spurs | 50 | 32 | .610 | 7 |
| 8 | x-Oklahoma City Thunder | 50 | 32 | .610 | 7 |
| 9 | Houston Rockets | 42 | 40 | .512 | 15 |
| 10 | Memphis Grizzlies | 40 | 42 | .488 | 17 |
| 11 | New Orleans Hornets | 37 | 45 | .451 | 20 |
| 12 | Los Angeles Clippers | 29 | 53 | .354 | 28 |
| 13 | Golden State Warriors | 26 | 56 | .317 | 31 |
| 14 | Sacramento Kings | 25 | 57 | .305 | 32 |
| 15 | Minnesota Timberwolves | 15 | 67 | .183 | 42 |

=== Game log ===
2009–10 game log
October: 2–0 (home: 1–0; road: 1–0)

| Game | Date | Team | Score | High points | High rebounds | High assists | Location Attendance | Record |
|---|---|---|---|---|---|---|---|---|
| 1 | October 28 | @ Clippers | W 109–97 | Steve Nash (24) | Grant Hill (13) | Steve Nash (8) | Staples Center; 15,974 | 1–0 |
| 2 | October 30 | Golden State | W 123–101 | Leandro Barbosa (24) | Channing Frye, Louis Amundson (8) | Steve Nash (20) | US Airways Center; 18,422 | 2–0 |

November: 12–3 (home: 5–0; road: 7–3)

| Game | Date | Team | Score | High points | High rebounds | High assists | Location Attendance | Record |
|---|---|---|---|---|---|---|---|---|
| 3 | November 1 | Minnesota | W 120–112 | Channing Frye (25) | Grant Hill (10) | Steve Nash (14) | US Airways Center; 15,376 | 3–0 |
| 4 | November 3 | @ Miami | W 104–96 | Steve Nash (30) | Grant Hill (12) | Steve Nash (8) | American Airlines Arena; 15,105 | 4–0 |
| 5 | November 4 | @ Orlando | L 100–122 | Amar'e Stoudemire (25) | Amar'e Stoudemire (14) | Goran Dragić (6) | Amway Arena; 17,461 | 4–1 |
| 6 | November 6 | @ Boston | W 110–103 | Jason Richardson (34) | Jason Richardson (10) | Steve Nash (12) | TD Garden; 18,624 | 5–1 |
| 7 | November 8 | @ Washington | W 102–90 | Jason Richardson (22) | Grant Hill (13) | Steve Nash (17) | Verizon Center; 14,143 | 6–1 |
| 8 | November 9 | @ Philadelphia | W 119–115 | Jason Richardson (29) | Grant Hill, Jason Richardson (8) | Steve Nash (20) | Wachovia Center; 10,205 | 7–1 |
| 9 | November 11 | New Orleans | W 124–104 | Amar'e Stoudemire (21) | Goran Dragić (7) | Steve Nash (10) | US Airways Center; 16,517 | 8–1 |
| 10 | November 12 | @ Lakers | L 102–121 | Jared Dudley (14) | Louis Amundson (9) | Steve Nash (5) | Staples Center; 18,997 | 8–2 |
| 11 | November 15 | Toronto | W 101–100 | Amar'e Stoudemire (30) | Jason Richardson (10) | Steve Nash (9) | US Airways Center; 16,605 | 9–2 |
| 12 | November 17 | @ Houston | W 111–105 | Amar'e Stoudemire (23) | Grant Hill (7) | Steve Nash (16) | Toyota Center; 16,396 | 10–2 |
| 13 | November 19 | @ New Orleans | L 103–110 | Amar'e Stoudemire (23) | Channing Frye (10) | Steve Nash (10) | New Orleans Arena; 14,520 | 10–3 |
| 14 | November 22 | Detroit | W 117–97 | Amar'e Stoudemire (21) | Grant Hill (8) | Steve Nash (9) | US Airways Center; 18,422 | 11–3 |
| 15 | November 25 | Memphis | W 126–111 | Amar'e Stoudemire (23) | Jason Richardson (5) | Steve Nash (16) | US Airways Center; 18,284 | 12–3 |
| 16 | November 27 | @ Minnesota | W 120–95 | Jason Richardson (22) | Louis Amundson (8) | Steve Nash (11) | Target Center; 18,225 | 13–3 |
| 17 | November 29 | @ Toronto | W 113–94 | Jason Richardson (22) | Grant Hill (9) | Steve Nash (16) | Air Canada Centre; 17,721 | 14–3 |

December: 7–9 (home: 7–2; road: 0–7)

| Game | Date | Team | Score | High points | High rebounds | High assists | Location Attendance | Record |
|---|---|---|---|---|---|---|---|---|
| 18 | December 1 | @ New York | L 99–126 | Steve Nash (20) | Jared Dudley (7) | Steve Nash (8) | Madison Square Garden; 19,763 | 14–4 |
| 19 | December 2 | @ Cleveland | L 90–107 | Channing Frye (22) | Amar'e Stoudemire (12) | Goran Dragic, Steve Nash (5) | Quicken Loans Arena; 20,562 | 14–5 |
| 20 | December 5 | Sacramento | W 115–107 | Steve Nash (32) | Amar'e Stoudemire (21) | Steve Nash (6) | US Airways Center; 17,747 | 15–5 |
| 21 | December 6 | @ Lakers | L 88–108 | Amar'e Stoudemire (18) | Amar'e Stoudemire (9) | Steve Nash (10) | STAPLES Center; 18.997 | 15–6 |
| 22 | December 8 | @ Dallas | L 101–102 | Steve Nash (27) | Channing Frye (9) | Steve Nash (8) | American Airlines Center; 19.857 | 15–7 |
| 23 | December 11 | Orlando | W 106–103 | Amar'e Stoudemire (28) | Amar'e Stoudemire (10) | Steve Nash (18) | US Airways Center; 18,216 | 16–7 |
| 24 | December 12 | @ Denver | L 99–105 | Steve Nash (28) | Louis Amundson (11) | Steve Nash (7) | Pepsi Center; 19,155 | 16–8 |
| 25 | December 15 | San Antonio | W 116–104 | Amar'e Stoudemire (28) | Amar'e Stoudemire (14) | Steve Nash (13) | US Airways Center; 17,964 | 17–8 |
| 26 | December 17 | @ Portland | L 102–105 | Amar'e Stoudemire (27) | Amar'e Stoudemire (11) | Steve Nash (13) | Rose Garden; 20,559 | 17–9 |
| 27 | December 19 | Washington | W 121–95 | Amar'e Stoudemire (23) | Amar'e Stoudemire (14) | Steve Nash (15) | US Airways Center; 16,811 | 18–9 |
| 28 | December 21 | Cleveland | L 91–109 | Steve Nash (18) | Amar'e Stoudemire (12) | Steve Nash (10) | US Airways Center; 18,221 | 18–10 |
| 29 | December 23 | Oklahoma City | L 113–117 | Amar'e Stoudemire (35) | Amar'e Stoudemire (14) | Steve Nash (12) | US Airways Center; 15,953 | 18–11 |
| 30 | December 25 | Clippers | W 124–93 | Amar'e Stoudemire (26) | Louis Amundson (10) | Steve Nash (8) | US Airways Center; 16,709 | 19–11 |
| 31 | December 26 | @ Golden State | L 127–132 | Steve Nash (36) | Grant Hill, Amar'e Stoudemire (7) | Steve Nash (9) | Oracle Arena; 19,550 | 19–12 |
| 32 | December 28 | Lakers | W 118–103 | Amar'e Stoudemire (26) | Channing Frye (11) | Steve Nash (13) | US Airways Center; 18,422 | 20–12 |
| 33 | December 30 | Boston | W 116–98 | Channing Frye, Amar'e Stoudemire (26) | Channing Frye (10) | Steve Nash (8) | US Airways Center; 18,422 | 21–12 |

January: 7–9 (home: 5–4; road: 2–5)

| Game | Date | Team | Score | High points | High rebounds | High assists | Location Attendance | Record |
|---|---|---|---|---|---|---|---|---|
| 34 | January 2 | Memphis | L 103–128 | Amar'e Stoudemire (29) | Louis Amundson (7) | Steve Nash (13) | US Airways Center; 17,135 | 21–13 |
| 35 | January 5 | @ Sacramento | W 113–109 | Steve Nash (30) | Jason Richardson (9) | Steve Nash (12) | ARCO Arena; 13,630 | 22–13 |
| 36 | January 6 | Houston | W 118–110 | Steve Nash (26) | Amar'e Stoudemire (11) | Steve Nash (12) | US Airways Center; 15,811 | 23–13 |
| 37 | January 8 | Miami | L 105–109 | Amar'e Stoudemire, Grant Hill (18) | Amar'e Stoudemire (18) | Steve Nash (12) | US Airways Center; 18,422 | 23–14 |
| 38 | January 11 | Milwaukee | W 105–101 | Steve Nash (30) | Amar'e Stoudemire (10) | Steve Nash (11) | US Airways Center 15,116 | 24–14 |
| 39 | January 13 | @ Indiana | L 114–122 | Amar'e Stoudemire (21) | Jason Richardson, Channing Frye (8) | Steve Nash (9) | Conseco Fieldhouse; 10,858 | 24–15 |
| 40 | January 15 | @ Atlanta | L 101–102 | Amar'e Stoudemire (28) | Amar'e Stoudemire (14) | Steve Nash (11) | Philips Arena; 17,605 | 24–16 |
| 41 | January 16 | @ Charlotte | L 99–125 | Amar'e Stoudemire (19) | Amar'e Stoudemire, Louis Amundson (7) | Steve Nash (5) | Time Warner Cable Arena; 17,574 | 24–17 |
| 42 | January 18 | @ Memphis | L 118–125 | Steve Nash (22) | Amar'e Stoudemire (9) | Steve Nash (12) | FedExForum; 18,119 | 24–18 |
| 43 | January 20 | New Jersey | W 118–94 | Amar'e Stoudemire (27) | Amar'e Stoudemire, Robin Lopez, Jason Richardson (7) | Steve Nash (15) | US Airways Center; 15,963 | 25–18 |
| 44 | January 22 | Chicago | L 104–115 | Amar'e Stoudemire (23) | Channing Frye, Jason Richardson, Louis Amundson (8) | Steve Nash (7) | US Airways Center; 18,422 | 25–19 |
| 45 | January 23 | Golden State | W 112–103 | Steve Nash (23) | Robin Lopez, Louis Amundson (9) | Steve Nash (6) | US Airways Center; 17,792 | 26–19 |
| 46 | January 25 | @ Utah | L 115–124 | Goran Dragić (32) | Jason Richardson (6) | Steve Nash (15) | EnergySolutions Arena; 19,911 | 26–20 |
| 47 | January 26 | Charlotte | L 109–114 | Steve Nash (23) | Jared Dudley (10) | Steve Nash (9) | US Airways Center; 15,722 | 26–21 |
| 48 | January 28 | Dallas | W 112–106 | Amar'e Stoudemire (22) | Jared Dudley, Robin Lopez, Channing Frye (6) | Steve Nash (11) | US Airways Center; 17,855 | 27–21 |
| 49 | January 31 | @ Houston | W 115–111 | Amar'e Stoudemire (36) | Amar'e Stoudemire (11) | Steve Nash (16) | Toyota Center; 17,165 | 28–21 |

February: 9–3 (home: 4–1; road: 5–2)

| Game | Date | Team | Score | High points | High rebounds | High assists | Location Attendance | Record |
|---|---|---|---|---|---|---|---|---|
| 50 | February 1 | @ New Orleans | W 109–100 | Amar'e Stoudemire (25) | Amar'e Stoudemire (12) | Steve Nash (12) | New Orleans Arena; 13,874 | 29–21 |
| 51 | February 3 | @ Denver | W 109–97 | Amar'e Stoudemire, Jason Richardson (20) | Amar'e Stoudemire (17) | Steve Nash (10) | Pepsi Center; 19,155 | 30–21 |
| 52 | February 5 | @ Sacramento | W 114–102 | Amar'e Stoudemire (30) | Amar'e Stoudemire (9) | Steve Nash (10) | ARCO Arena; 14,922 | 31–21 |
| 53 | February 10 | Portland | L 101–108 | Amar'e Stoudemire (24) | Amar'e Stoudemire (9) | Steve Nash (11) | US Airways Center; 18,190 | 31–22 |
| 54 | February 16 | @ Memphis | W 109–95 | Jason Richardson (27) | Amar'e Stoudemire, Robin Lopez (10) | Steve Nash (16) | FedExForum; 11,508 | 32–22 |
| 55 | February 17 | @ Dallas | L 97–107 | Amar'e Stoudemire (30) | Amar'e Stoudemire (14) | Steve Nash (12) | American Airlines Center; 19,974 | 32–23 |
| 56 | February 19 | Atlanta | W 88–80 | Amar'e Stoudemire (22) | Robin Lopez (9) | Steve Nash (6) | US Airways Center; 18,266 | 33–23 |
| 57 | February 21 | Sacramento | W 104–88 | Jason Richardson (26) | Amar'e Stoudemire (14) | Steve Nash (11) | US Airways Center; 17,369 | 34–23 |
| 58 | February 23 | @ Oklahoma City | W 104–102 | Amar'e Stoudemire (30) | Jason Richardson (13) | Goran Dragic (10) | Ford Center; 18,203 | 35–23 |
| 59 | February 24 | Philadelphia | W 106–95 | Jason Richardson (24) | Robin Lopez (10) | Steve Nash (13) | US Airways Center; 17,765 | 36–23 |
| 60 | February 26 | Clippers | W 125–112 | Robin Lopez (30) | Robin Lopez (12) | Steve Nash (11) | US Airways Center; 18,043 | 37–23 |
| 61 | February 28 | @ San Antonio | L 110–113 | Amar'e Stoudemire (41) | Amar'e Stoudemire (12) | Steve Nash (11) | AT&T Center; 18,581 | 37–24 |

March: 12–2 (home: 7–2; road: 5–0)

| Game | Date | Team | Score | High points | High rebounds | High assists | Location Attendance | Record |
|---|---|---|---|---|---|---|---|---|
| 62 | March 1 | Denver | W 101–85 | Amar'e Stoudemire, Grant Hill (19) | Amar'e Stoudemire (10) | Steve Nash (10) | US Airways Center; 18,159 | 38–24 |
| 63 | March 3 | @ Clippers | W 127–101 | Amar'e Stoudemire (30) | Amar'e Stoudemire (14) | Steve Nash (15) | STAPLES Center; 17,455 | 39–24 |
| 64 | March 4 | Utah | L 108–116 | Amar'e Stoudemire (30) | Amar'e Stoudemire, Robin Lopez, Grant Hill, Jason Richardson (7) | Steve Nash (15) | US Airways Center; 17,912 | 39–25 |
| 65 | March 6 | Indiana | W 113–105 | Amar'e Stoudemire (30) | Jared Dudley (12) | Steve Nash, Grant Hill (5) | US Airways Center; 18,180 | 40–25 |
| 66 | March 12 | Lakers | L 96–102 | Amar'e Stoudemire (29) | Amar'e Stoudemire (16) | Steve Nash (8) | US Airways Center; 18,422 | 40–26 |
| 67 | March 14 | New Orleans | W 120–106 | Amar'e Stoudemire (36) | Amar'e Stoudemire (12) | Steve Nash (12) | US Airways Center; 18,218 | 41–26 |
| 68 | March 16 | Minnesota | W 152–114 | Jason Richardson (27) | Robin Lopez (9) | Steve Nash (14) | US Airways Center; 18,179 | 42–26 |
| 69 | March 19 | Utah | W 110–100 | Amar'e Stoudemire (44) | Robin Lopez (10) | Steve Nash (10) | US Airways Center; 18,422 | 43–26 |
| 70 | March 21 | Portland | W 93–87 | Amar'e Stoudemire (18) | Amar'e Stoudemire (14) | Steve Nash (8) | US Airways Center; 18,422 | 44–26 |
| 71 | March 22 | @ Golden State | W 133–131 | Amar'e Stoudemire (37) | Grant Hill (9) | Steve Nash (12) | Oracle Arena; 18,722 | 45–26 |
| 72 | March 26 | New York | W 132–96 | Amar'e Stoudemire, Leandro Barbosa (18) | Channing Frye (11) | Goran Dragic (10) | U.S. Airways Center; 18,422 | 46–26 |
| 73 | March 28 | @ Minnesota | W 111–105 | Amar'e Stoudemire (30) | Amar'e Stoudemire (17) | Steve Nash (11) | Target Center; 16,668 | 47–26 |
| 74 | March 30 | @ Chicago | W 111–105 | Jason Richardson (27) | Amar'e Stoudemire (11) | Steve Nash (10) | United Center; 21,169 | 48–26 |
| 75 | March 31 | @ New Jersey | W 116–105 | Steve Nash (24) | Steve Nash (7) | Steve Nash (14) | Izod Center; 14,734 | 49–26 |

April: 5–2 (home: 3–0; road: 2–2)

| Game | Date | Team | Score | High points | High rebounds | High assists | Location Attendance | Record |
|---|---|---|---|---|---|---|---|---|
| 76 | April 2 | @ Detroit | W 109–94 | Amar'e Stoudemire (29) | Amar'e Stoudemire, Grant Hill, Louis Amundson (6) | Grant Hill (8) | Palace of Auburn Hills; 22,076 | 50–26 |
| 77 | April 3 | @ Milwaukee | L 98–107 | Amar'e Stoudemire (22) | Amar'e Stoudemire (8) | Goran Dragic (6) | Bradley Center; 18,717 | 50–27 |
| 78 | April 7 | San Antonio | W 112–101 | Amar'e Stoudemire (29) | Amar'e Stoudemire, Grant Hill (8) | Steve Nash (12) | US Airways Center; 18,422 | 51–27 |
| 79 | April 9 | @ Oklahoma City | L 91–96 | Amar'e Stoudemire (24) | Amar'e Stoudemire (15) | Steve Nash (12) | Ford Center; 18,334 | 51–28 |
| 80 | April 11 | Houston | W 116–106 | Amar'e Stoudemire (35) | Amar'e Stoudemire (13) | Steve Nash (11) | US Airways Center; 18,422 | 52–28 |
| 81 | April 13 | Denver | W 123–101 | Amar'e Stoudemire (26) | Amar'e Stoudemire, Channing Frye (8) | Steve Nash (10) | US Airways Center; 18,422 | 53–28 |
| 82 | April 14 | @ Utah | W 100–86 | Amar'e Stoudemire (20) | Amar'e Stoudemire (7) | Steve Nash (11) | EnergySolutions Arena; 19,911 | 54–28 |

2009–10 season schedule

== Playoffs ==
The Suns defeated the Portland Trail Blazers in six games in the first round. They swept the San Antonio Spurs in four games in the Western Conference semifinals, defeating them for the second time in 10 years, after having been eliminated by them in recent seasons four times in five playoff series. The Suns would face the Pacific division-winners Los Angeles Lakers, also the West's top seed, in the Western Conference finals, but lose the series in six games.

=== Game log ===
2010 playoff game log
First Round: 4–2 (home: 2–1; road: 2–1)

| Game | Date | Team | Score | High points | High rebounds | High assists | Location Attendance | Series |
|---|---|---|---|---|---|---|---|---|
| 1 | April 18 | Portland | L 100–105 | Steve Nash (25) | Jason Richardson (10) | Steve Nash (9) | US Airways Center; 18,422 | 0–1 |
| 2 | April 20 | Portland | W 119–90 | Jason Richardson (29) | Grant Hill (8) | Steve Nash (16) | US Airways Center; 18,422 | 1–1 |
| 3 | April 22 | @ Portland | W 108–89 | Jason Richardson (42) | Jason Richardson (8) | Steve Nash (10) | Rose Garden; 20,271 | 2–1 |
| 4 | April 24 | @ Portland | L 87–96 | Amar'e Stoudemire (26) | Grant Hill (12) | Steve Nash (8) | Rose Garden; 20,151 | 2–2 |
| 5 | April 26 | Portland | W 107–88 | Channing Frye (20) | Channing Frye, Jason Richardson (8) | Steve Nash (10) | US Airways Center; 18,422 | 3–2 |
| 6 | April 29 | @ Portland | W 99–90 | Jason Richardson (28) | Grant Hill (12) | Steve Nash (6) | Rose Garden; 20,313 | 4–2 |

Conference Semifinals: 4–0 (home: 2–0; road: 2–0)

| Game | Date | Team | Score | High points | High rebounds | High assists | Location Attendance | Series |
|---|---|---|---|---|---|---|---|---|
| 1 | May 3 | San Antonio | W 111–102 | Steve Nash (33) | Amar'e Stoudemire (13) | Steve Nash (10) | US Airways Center; 18,422 | 1–0 |
| 2 | May 5 | San Antonio | W 110–102 | Amar'e Stoudemire (23) | Amar'e Stoudemire (11) | Steve Nash (6) | US Airways Center; 18,422 | 2–0 |
| 3 | May 7 | @ San Antonio | W 110–96 | Goran Dragić (26) | Steve Nash, Amar'e Stoudemire (8) | Steve Nash (6) | AT&T Center; 18,581 | 3–0 |
| 4 | May 9 | @ San Antonio | W 107–101 | Amar'e Stoudemire (29) | Jason Richardson (8) | Steve Nash (9) | AT&T Center; 18,581 | 4–0 |

Conference Finals: 2–4 (home: 2–1; road: 0–3)

| Game | Date | Team | Score | High points | High rebounds | High assists | Location Attendance | Series |
|---|---|---|---|---|---|---|---|---|
| 1 | May 17 | @ L.A. Lakers | L 107–128 | Amar'e Stoudemire (23) | Louis Amundson, Robin Lopez, Jason Richardson (6) | Steve Nash (13) | Staples Center; 18,997 | 0–1 |
| 2 | May 19 | @ L.A. Lakers | L 112–124 | Jason Richardson (27) | Robin Lopez, Amar'e Stoudemire (6) | Steve Nash (15) | Staples Center; 18,997 | 0–2 |
| 3 | May 23 | L.A. Lakers | W 118–109 | Amar'e Stoudemire (42) | Amar'e Stoudemire (11) | Steve Nash (15) | US Airways Center; 18,422 | 1–2 |
| 4 | May 25 | L.A. Lakers | W 115–106 | Amar'e Stoudemire (21) | Amar'e Stoudemire (8) | Goran Dragić, Steve Nash (8) | US Airways Center; 18,422 | 2–2 |
| 5 | May 27 | @ L.A. Lakers | L 101–103 | Steve Nash (29) | Channing Frye (11) | Steve Nash (10) | Staples Center; 18,997 | 2–3 |
| 6 | May 29 | L.A. Lakers | L 103–111 | Amar'e Stoudemire (27) | Channing Frye (13) | Steve Nash (9) | US Airways Center; 18,422 | 2–4 |

2010 playoff schedule

== Player statistics ==
Legend
| GP | Games played | GS | Games started | MPG | Minutes per game |
| FG% | Field-goal percentage | 3P% | 3-point field-goal percentage | FT% | Free-throw percentage |
| RPG | Rebounds per game | APG | Assists per game | SPG | Steals per game |
| BPG | Blocks per game | PPG | Points per game |

=== Season ===
| Player | GP | GS | MPG | FG% | 3P% | FT% | RPG | APG | SPG | BPG | PPG |
|---|---|---|---|---|---|---|---|---|---|---|---|
| Louis Amundson | 79 | 0 | 14.8 | .551 | .000 | .545 | 4.4 | 0.4 | .3 | .9 | 4.7 |
| Leandro Barbosa | 44 | 5 | 17.9 | .425 | .324 | .877 | 1.6 | 1.5 | .5 | .3 | 9.5 |
| Earl Clark | 51 | 0 | 7.5 | .371 | .400 | .722 | 1.2 | 0.4 | .1 | .3 | 2.7 |
| Jarron Collins | 34 | 10 | 7.7 | .387 | . | .400 | 1.8 | 0.2 | .1 | .1 | 1.0 |
| Jared Dudley | 82 | 1 | 24.3 | .459 | .458 | .754 | 3.4 | 1.4 | 1.0 | .2 | 8.2 |
| Goran Dragić | 80 | 2 | 18.0 | .452 | .394 | .736 | 2.1 | 3.0 | .6 | .1 | 7.9 |
| Channing Frye | 81 | 41 | 27.0 | .451 | .439 | .810 | 5.3 | 1.4 | .8 | .9 | 11.2 |
| Taylor Griffin | 8 | 0 | 4.0 | .400 | .000 | .500 | 0.3 | 0.1 | .0 | .3 | 1.3 |
| Grant Hill | 81 | 81 | 30.0 | .478 | .438 | .817 | 5.5 | 2.4 | .7 | .4 | 11.3 |
| Dwayne Jones | 2 | 0 | 3.5 | . | . | . | 1.0 | 0.0 | .0 | .0 | 0.0 |
| Robin Lopez | 51 | 31 | 19.3 | .588† | . | .704 | 4.9 | 0.1 | .2 | 1.0+ | 8.4 |
| Steve Nash | 81 | 81 | 32.8 | .507 | .426 | .938 | 3.3 | 11.0 | .5 | .1 | 16.5 |
| Jason Richardson | 79 | 76 | 31.5 | .474 | .393 | .739 | 5.1 | 1.8 | .8 | .4 | 15.7 |
| Amar'e Stoudemire | 82 | 82 | 34.6 | .557† | .167 | .771 | 8.9 | 1.0 | 0.6 | 1.0+ | 23.1 |
| Alando Tucker* | 11 | 0 | 6.5 | .433 | .143 | .762 | 0.6 | 0.3 | .0 | .0 | 3.9 |

* – Stats with the Suns.
† – Minimum 300 field goals made.
+ – Minimum 70 games played or 100 blocks.

=== Playoffs ===
| Player | GP | GS | MPG | FG% | 3P% | FT% | RPG | APG | SPG | BPG | PPG |
|---|---|---|---|---|---|---|---|---|---|---|---|
| Louis Amundson | 16 | 0 | 12.1 | .528† | . | .429 | 3.5 | 0.1 | .4 | .4 | 2.9 |
| Leandro Barbosa | 16 | 0 | 15.6 | .417 | .343 | .708 | 1.3 | 1.3 | .3 | .1 | 7.2 |
| Earl Clark | 3 | 0 | 4.3 | .333 | . | 1.000^ | 0.7 | 0.3 | .3 | .0 | 1.3 |
| Jarron Collins | 11 | 10 | 10.5 | .333 | . | 1.000^ | 1.5 | 0.0 | .1 | .1 | 1.1 |
| Goran Dragić | 16 | 0 | 14.8 | .430 | .325 | .742 | 1.8 | 2.3 | .3 | .1 | 7.6 |
| Jared Dudley | 16 | 0 | 23.6 | .465 | .424 | .607 | 3.8 | 1.8 | 1.1 | .4 | 7.6 |
| Channing Frye | 16 | 0 | 27.2 | .364 | .349 | .938^ | 5.6 | 0.9 | .8 | .6 | 8.2 |
| Grant Hill | 16 | 16 | 28.3 | .480 | .188 | .868 | 5.8 | 2.3 | .8 | .6 | 9.6 |
| Dwayne Jones | 2 | 0 | 5.0 | .500 | . | .750 | 2.5 | .0 | .0 | .0 | 2.5 |
| Robin Lopez | 6 | 6 | 17.3 | .543† | . | 1.000^ | 4.0 | .0 | .3 | .2 | 7.8 |
| Steve Nash | 16 | 16 | 33.7 | .518 | .380 | .893 | 3.3 | 10.1 | .3 | .1 | 17.8 |
| Jason Richardson | 16 | 16 | 33.3 | .502 | .475 | .759 | 5.4 | 1.1 | 1.1 | .3 | 19.8 |
| Amar'e Stoudemire | 16 | 16 | 36.5 | .519† | .000 | .754 | 6.6 | 1.1 | .7 | 1.5 | 22.2 |

† – Minimum 20 field goals made.
^ – Minimum 10 free throws made.

== Awards, records and milestones ==
=== Awards ===
==== Week/Month ====
- Alvin Gentry (West Coach of the Month – November 2009)
- Alvin Gentry (West Coach of the Month – March 2010)
- Amar'e Stoudemire (West Player of the Month – March 2010)

==== All-Star ====
- Nash and Stoudemire were selected to play in the 2010 NBA All-Star Game. Additionally, Nash was the 2010 Skills Challenge winner in the event held during All-Star Weekend.

=== Season ===
- Nash and Stoudemire were named to the All-NBA Second Team.
- Nash led the league in two statistical categories: assists per game (11.0) and free throw percentage (93.8%).

=== Milestones ===
- On January 16, 2010, Stoudemire scored his 10,000th career point in a loss to the Charlotte Bobcats.
- On January 26, 2010, Nash became the eighth player in NBA history to surpass 8,000 assists in the Suns' loss to the Utah Jazz.

== Injuries and surgeries ==
- Robin Lopez broke his ankle near the end of the season. This resulted in them wanting Jarron Collins and later, Dwayne Jones.

== Transactions ==
=== Trades ===
June
| June 25, 2009 | To Cleveland Cavaliers Shaquille O'Neal | To Phoenix Suns Ben Wallace Sasha Pavlovic Second round pick in the 2010 NBA draft $500,000 |
| June 26, 2009 | To Phoenix Suns Cash considerations | To Cleveland Cavaliers Rights to Emir Preldžič (57th overall in 2009 NBA draft) |

=== Free agents ===
==== Additions ====
On July 11, the Suns re-signed Grant Hill and Louis Amundson. On July 13, the Suns signed a two-year contract with former University of Arizona center Channing Frye.
