= Srdjan Pejicic =

Bosnian basketball player (1991-)

No. 11 – Grifo Basket
- Position: Shooting guard / small forward

Personal information
- Born: 26 April 1991 (age 35) Sarajevo, SR Bosnia and Herzegovina, SFR Yugoslavia
- Listed height: 6 ft 7 in (2.01 m)
- Listed weight: 200 lb (91 kg)

Career information
- High school: Bluevale Collegiate Institute (Waterloo, Ontario)
- College: Waterloo (2009–2013)
- NBA draft: 2013: undrafted
- Playing career: 2014–present

Career history
- 2014–2015: UBA Istanbul (Turkey)
- 2015–present: Grifo Basket (Italy)

Srdjan Pejicic (born 26 April 1991) is a Bosnian-Canadian professional basketball player who is currently playing in Italy for Grifo Basket. He was also a member of the Bosnian national team. He played university basketball for University of Waterloo (CIS – Canada).

== High school ==
Pejicic played for Bluevale Collegiate Institute in Waterloo, Canada. His senior season he averaged 17 points, 5 rebounds and 3 assists per game, while leading his team to a 33–9 record, and was named to the All-City All-Star Team. In 2008, he was selected a top shooting guard in Canada and won all tournament at Silverfox, Hamilton as well as winning the 3-point shootout.

== College career ==
Pejicic went on to play at the University of Waterloo, which plays in the CIS (Canada), between 2010 and 2013. He appeared in 87 career games for the Warriors, and is 4th all-time in 3-point percentage (45.9%) during regular season league games, 4th all-time in 3-point percentage (46.8%) for career records for CIS, and 4th all-time in 3-point percentage (46.0%) in all career games.

Pejicic was nominated as a 2015 Young Alumni. Through his involvement in the community on and off the court he received the prestigious nomination. A well spoken presenter for the environment as well as a motivator for the youth.

=== Notable Year (2011–2012) ===
Pejicic's breakout season came in his junior year. He started 9 out of 24 games while averaging 22.4 minutes per game helping the Warriors to a 9–15 record. After a slow start to the season, Pejicic was seen as one of the surprise players in the OUA (Ontario University Athletics) began to consistently put up good performances for the Warriors, including being named the Waterloo's Player of the Week during the week of 9 February. During this time he led Waterloo in scoring and provided a scoring outburst vs the 5th CIS ranked Windsor Lancers. He finished the game with 28 points, 6 rebounds and 7 three-pointers.

== Pro career ==
=== UBA Basket ===
In December 2014, Pejicic traveled to Turkey to part-take in exposure and tryout in the BSL League of the A1 league in Turkey. In 11 games and 10 starts in the BSL league, Pejicic posted averages of 13 points per game to go along with 5 rebounds per game in 21.5 minutes per game. He also shot 44% from 3. Out of the players attending only one player was signed Esian Henderson formerly of Iowa Energy (2013).

=== Imola Grifo Basket ===
In September 2015, Pejicic signed a one-year contract with Grifo Basket in Italy, to play for previous Italian pro who is now coach Zarifi Elefterios.

== National team ==
=== Canada ===
Pejicic was selected to attend training camps with the Junior National Teams of Canada (2007–2008). In 2007, he was unable to attend with the team for personal reasons.

=== Bosnia & Herzegovina ===
Pejicic was a top 20 selection of the Bosnia & Herzegovina National Team U21. In 2012, he was part of their training camp throughout the summer and before their first game vs Iceland he was released. He participated in pre-tournament and averaged 13 points, 2.2 rebounds and 1.3 assists in 3 games.

== Personal ==
Pejicic resides in Waterloo, Canada. His father, Jovica, played professionally in Europe for 10 years (1978–1988) in the Former Yugoslavia. He played for KK Bosna for 5 years and was considered a top guard in his time.
