= George Hill (basketball) =

American basketball player (born 1986)

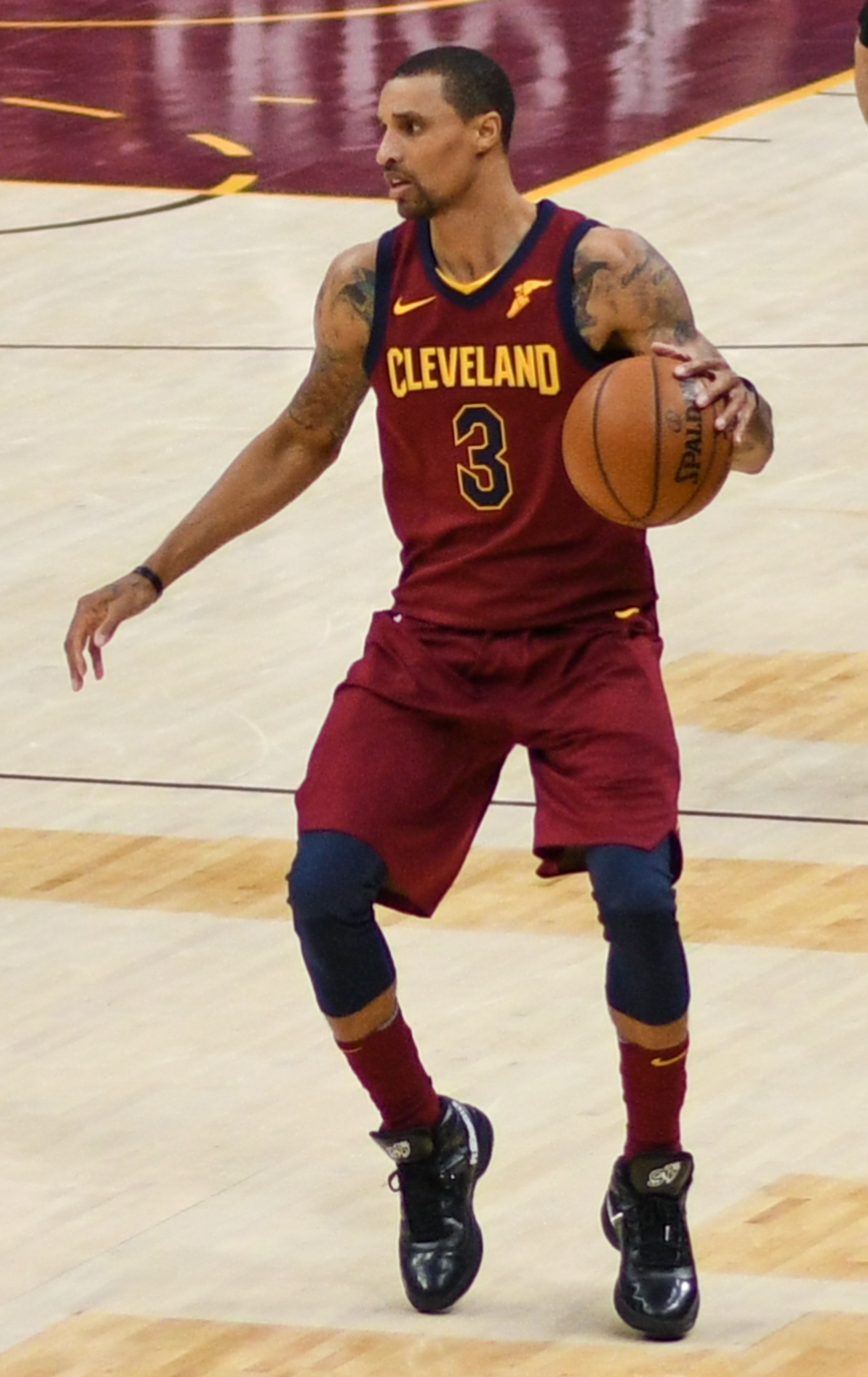
- Hill with the Cleveland Cavaliers in 2018

Personal information
- Born: May 4, 1986 (age 40) Indianapolis, Indiana, U.S.
- Listed height: 6 ft 4 in (1.93 m)
- Listed weight: 188 lb (85 kg)

Career information
- High school: Broad Ripple (Indianapolis, Indiana)
- College: IUPUI (2004–2008)
- NBA draft: 2008: 1st round, 26th overall pick
- Drafted by: San Antonio Spurs
- Playing career: 2008–2023
- Position: Point guard / shooting guard

Career history
- 2008–2011: San Antonio Spurs
- 2011–2016: Indiana Pacers
- 2016–2017: Utah Jazz
- 2017–2018: Sacramento Kings
- 2018: Cleveland Cavaliers
- 2018–2020: Milwaukee Bucks
- 2020–2021: Oklahoma City Thunder
- 2021: Philadelphia 76ers
- 2021–2023: Milwaukee Bucks
- 2023: Indiana Pacers

Career highlights
- Summit League Player of the Year (2008); First-team All-Summit League (2008)
- Stats at NBA.com
- Stats at Basketball Reference

George Jesse Hill Jr. (born May 4, 1986) is an American former professional basketball player who last played for the Indiana Pacers of the National Basketball Association (NBA). While playing for Indiana University–Purdue University Indianapolis (IUPUI), he was named Summit League Player of the Year and was an honorable mention All-American in his junior season.

A guard, Hill was selected 26th overall by the San Antonio Spurs in the 2008 NBA draft. He spent three seasons with the team before being traded to the Pacers in June 2011. He spent five seasons in Indiana and was dealt to the Utah Jazz in July 2016. Hill has also played for the Sacramento Kings, the Cleveland Cavaliers, the Milwaukee Bucks, the Oklahoma City Thunder, and the Philadelphia 76ers. He played in the NBA Finals as a member of the Cavaliers in 2018.

== Early life ==
Born and raised in Indianapolis, Indiana, Hill looked up to players like Michael Jordan, Magic Johnson, and Larry Bird while dreaming of one day playing in the NBA; when asked about his goal of becoming a first-round pick in the 2008 NBA draft, Hill commented: "It's my childhood dream". He played basketball at St. Richard's Episcopal School. An only child, Hill attended Broad Ripple High School where he excelled as one of the top high school players in the state and was one of the "Magnificent Seven" from Indianapolis (with Greg Oden, Mike Conley Jr., Josh McRoberts, Rodney Carney, Eric Gordon, and Courtney Lee). Carney remembers playing against Hill: "This little kid comes in hitting all kinds of 3s, and I was like, 'Who is this little dude?...I knew he was going to be something when I saw this little skinny kid handling the ball and shooting like that." Hill played against every member of the Magnificent Seven except Gordon, who was recovering from a broken wrist during their meetup. He faced off against Oden and Conley during his junior year in high school, and remembers playing pickup games against 10-year-old Gordon when he was 13.

In his senior year, Hill averaged a state-leading 36.2 points per game, the fifth-highest single-season average in Indiana High School Athletic Association history.

== College career ==
Despite scholarship offers from several big conference schools, including Temple and Indiana, he chose to commit to IUPUI, wishing to stay with his ailing great-grandfather, Gilbert Edison. A few months after he agreed to attend IUPUI, his great-grandfather died, never getting the opportunity to see Hill play basketball at the college level. Following his great-grandfather's advice to always be a man of his word, Hill decided to pass on other offers and stay at IUPUI.

In his sophomore year, he led the IUPUI Jaguars to a tie for the best record in the conference.

Following an injury that forced him to become a redshirt in his third year at IUPUI, Hill returned the next season and led the Jaguars to a school-record 26 wins and the Summit League Tournament finals before losing to eventual champion Oral Roberts University and thus failing to secure a spot in the NCAA tournament.

Not counting Hill's injury-shortened 2006–07 season, the Jaguars were 61–30 during his three seasons at IUPUI.

Despite having one year of eligibility left, Hill, wishing to "test the waters", declared himself eligible for the 2008 NBA draft. He left IUPUI as the fifth all-time leading scorer with 1,619 points, and became the second IUPUI player to declare early after Carlos Knox in 1997 (he later withdrew his name).

== Professional career ==
=== San Antonio Spurs (2008–2011) ===
Although he had regularly attracted NBA scouts to his college games, Hill was not projected in most mock drafts largely due to remaining unannounced.

The hard part was putting my name in, knowing I have great teammates and great coaches and if it came down to me leaving, I wouldn't be able to play for the team or the coaches again...The easy thing was, if I put my name in and don't get drafted, I still have the option of coming back and playing for this great university.

— George Hill,

In the following months, Hill worked out with several NBA teams. After an impressive run at the Orlando pre-draft rookie camp, Hill attracted attention and became a projected second-round selection. On draft night, the San Antonio Spurs surprised many by selecting Hill with their 26th pick in the first round; many expected the Spurs to select Mario Chalmers of Kansas. Hill became the second first-round draft choice in The Summit League's history and the first player ever drafted from IUPUI. On September 23, 2008, the Spurs signed Hill to a standard rookie contract that guaranteed the first two years and included a team option on the next two years.

==== 2008–09 season ====
On July 14, 2008, in his first summer league game as a Spur, Hill scored 17 points and grabbed 8 rebounds while holding fellow draft pick O. J. Mayo to 5-of-17 shooting en route to a victory for the Spurs. Throughout the summer league Hill struggled with his shooting, making only 2 of 25 shots (8.0%), and one of six three-pointers (16.7%). Hill played in all but one of the four summer league games for the Spurs; he finished averaging 8.0 points, 7.0 rebounds, and 3.0 assists in 31.7 minutes per game.

At the Utah Revue, Hill led his team by averaging 12.9 points over four games; however he continued to struggle offensively with his shooting, only making 21.4% of his three-point field goals. In the first of the four games, Hill led all scorers with 21 points and helped the Spurs defeat the Utah Jazz, 82–57. He followed up with a quiet offensive performance, 6 points, in a win against the NBDL Ambassadors, before scoring 18 points in a loss versus the Gerald Green-led Mavericks. In the final game of the Revue, Hill once again struggled with his shooting (1–7) but managed to make key plays with the game on the line. Hill made two clutch free throws with 6.9 seconds left and then forced a turnover on the defensive end to beat the previously undefeated Atlanta Hawks.

In 2008, Hill joined the San Antonio Spurs and made his NBA debut on November 4 against the Dallas Mavericks in the third game of the season. He had sat out the previous two games due to a sprained left thumb. In 15 minutes of play, Hill finished with 11 points, 1 steal, and 1 assist. Hill initially served as the main reserve at point guard, but after Tony Parker suffered an injury early in the season he was promoted to starter. After the return of Parker and Manu Ginóbili, Hill received fewer minutes. He finished his rookie season averaging 5.7 points per game, 2.1 rebounds per game, and 1.8 assists per game. Hill made his playoff debut in game 2 of the Spurs first-round series against the Mavs, but only played 5 minutes.

==== 2009–10 season ====
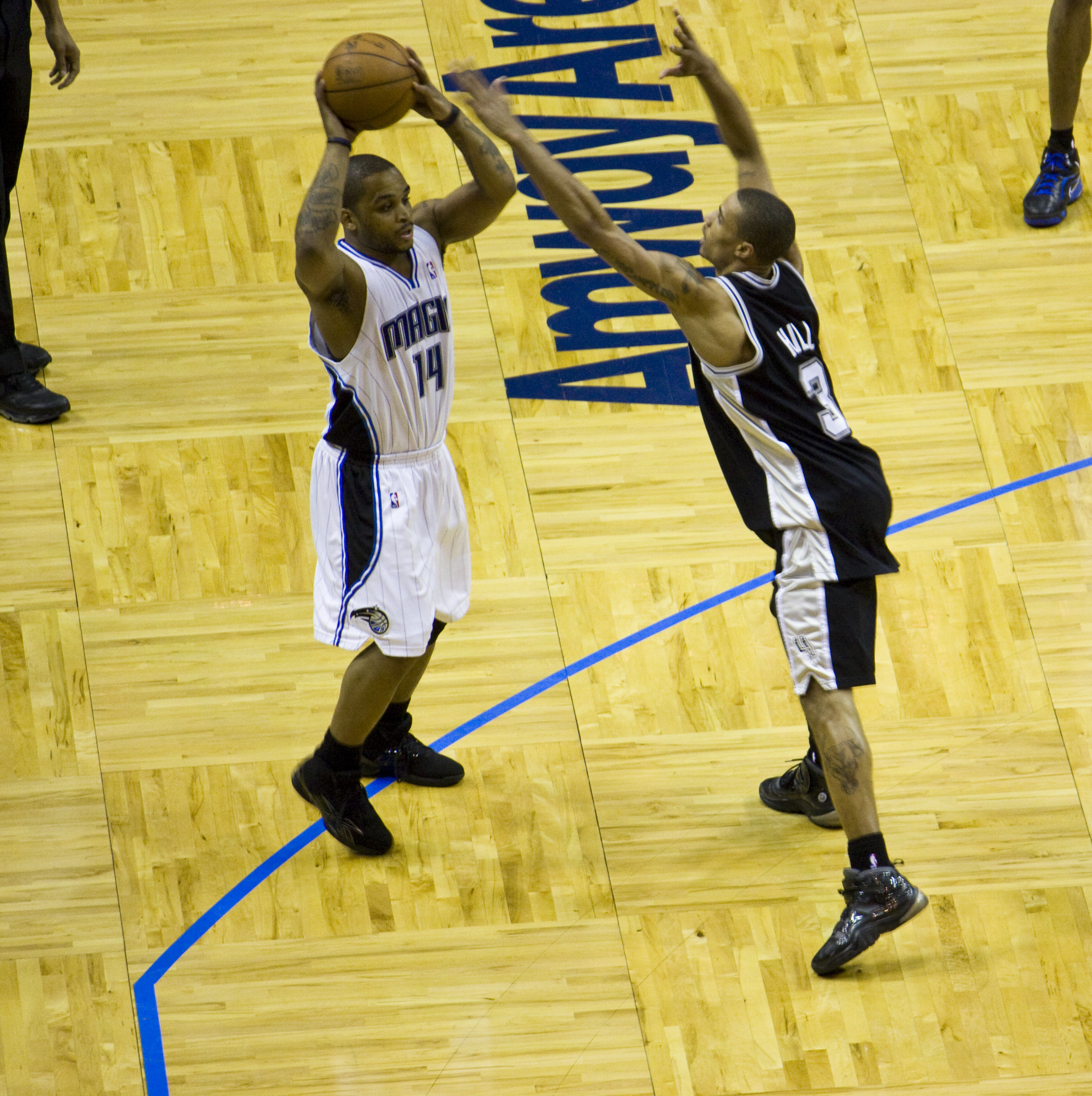
Hill in March 2010, defending Jameer Nelson of the Orlando Magic

Hill spent most of his off-season working on his point-guard skills, supervised by player development coach Chad Forcier, and his jump shots with Spurs shooting coach Chip Engelland. Following the advice of former Spur Bruce Bowen, he focused on developing his corner three-point shot. By the time training camp arrived, Hill had converted 8,000 threes.

His hard work during the off-season paid large dividends as soon as the 2009–10 season commenced. Hill saw his minutes increase from 16.5 to 29 a game. He also started in 43 games, most of them while Tony Parker was battling injuries. Hill more than doubled his scoring average, improved his field goal percentage by 7.5 percentage points, and his 3-pt shooting by 7.9 percentage points. On April 1, Hill notched career highs of 30 points, 5 steals, and 7 assists in a home game win against the Houston Rockets. Hill ended the regular season tied at second place with Kevin Durant and Marc Gasol for the Most Improved Player of the Year award. All three garnered a total of 101 points.

The Spurs' first-round playoff series with the Mavs was a breakout series for Hill. He was ineffective in Game 1, scoring 0 points in 17 minutes after coming back from an ankle injury. He shook off his tentativeness in the next few games, scoring 7 and 17 points in Games 2 and 3. Then Hill led the Spurs to a Game 4 victory on a night when the Spurs' Big Three of Duncan, Parker, and Ginobili shot a combined 9-of-34 from the field. Hill scored a career playoff high 29 points, shooting 11–16 from the field and 5–6 from 3-point range. Hill averaged 22.3 points in the series, helping the Spurs to win the series in six games.

==== 2010–11 season ====
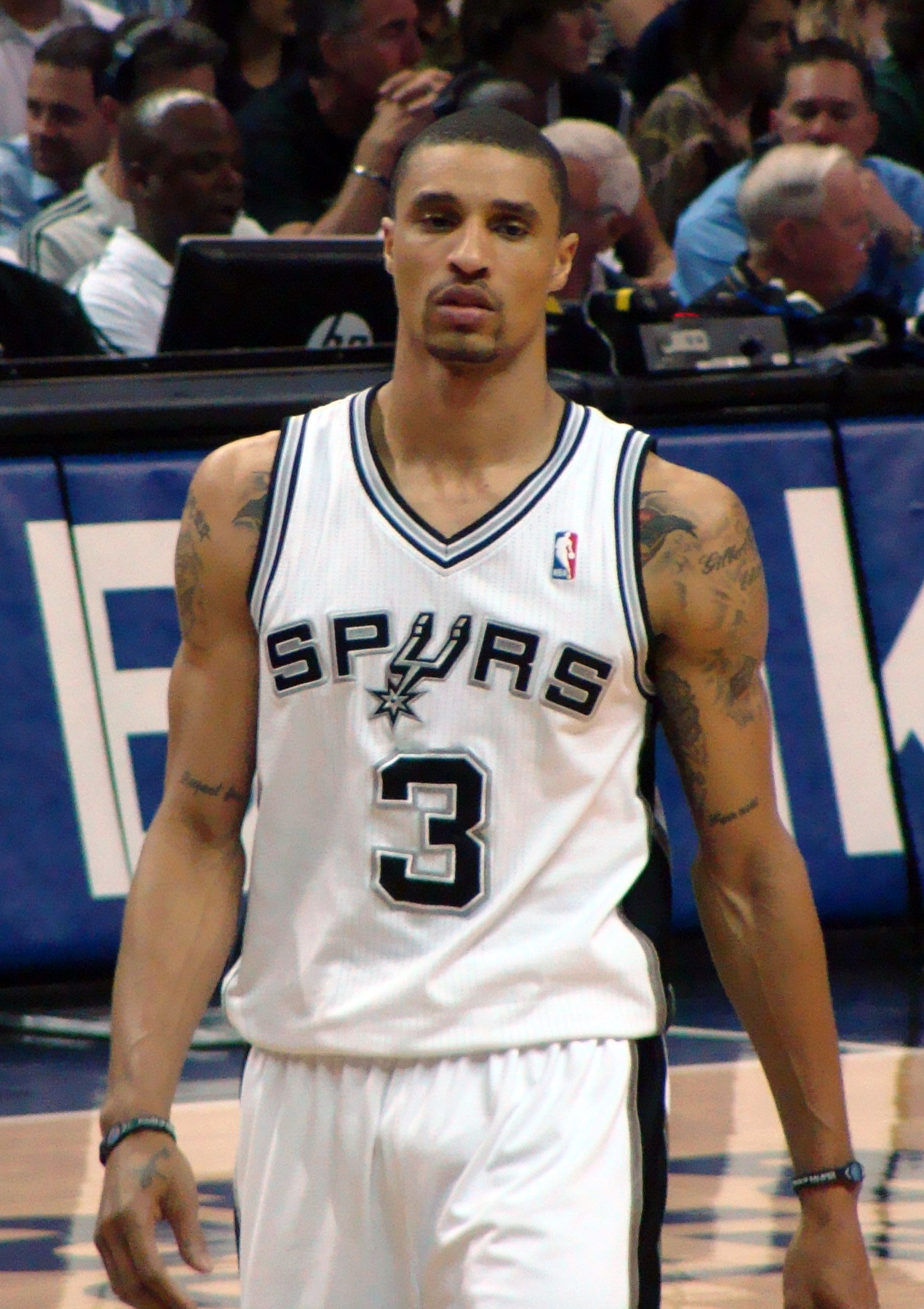
Hill in March 2011

On March 28, 2011, Hill matched his career high of 30 points in a 119–114 loss to the Houston Rockets.

=== Indiana Pacers (2011–2016) ===
Hill was traded to his hometown team the Indiana Pacers during the 2011 NBA draft on June 23, 2011, a trade that sent rights to the 15th overall pick Kawhi Leonard, the 42nd pick, Dāvis Bertāns, and 2005 draftee Erazem Lorbek to the Spurs in exchange for Hill.

Hill started the shortened season as a backup for Darren Collison. On January 31, 2012, Hill left the game against the New Jersey Nets after suffering an ankle injury. The Pacers announced it was a small chip fracture. He missed 12 games with the injury and returned on February 22, against the Charlotte Bobcats. On April 9, 2012, Pacers coach Frank Vogel announced that Hill would start for the injured Collison. Although Collison returned from the injury, Hill remained a starter for the rest of the season. Hill finished the season averaging 9.6 points per game with a field goal percentage of .442.

During their first-round playoff series against the Orlando Magic, Hill scored double-digits in all five games as the Pacers advanced to the Eastern Conferences Semifinal. Facing the Miami Heat in the Conference Semifinals, Hill scored a playoff high 20 points and 5 assists in game 3. The Heat won the next 3 games, advancing to the Conference Finals and eventually becoming NBA champions.

On July 13, 2012, Hill re-signed with the Pacers to a reported five-year, $40 million contract. Hill became the full-time starter after the departure of Darren Collison, who would be traded to the Dallas Mavericks for Ian Mahinmi.

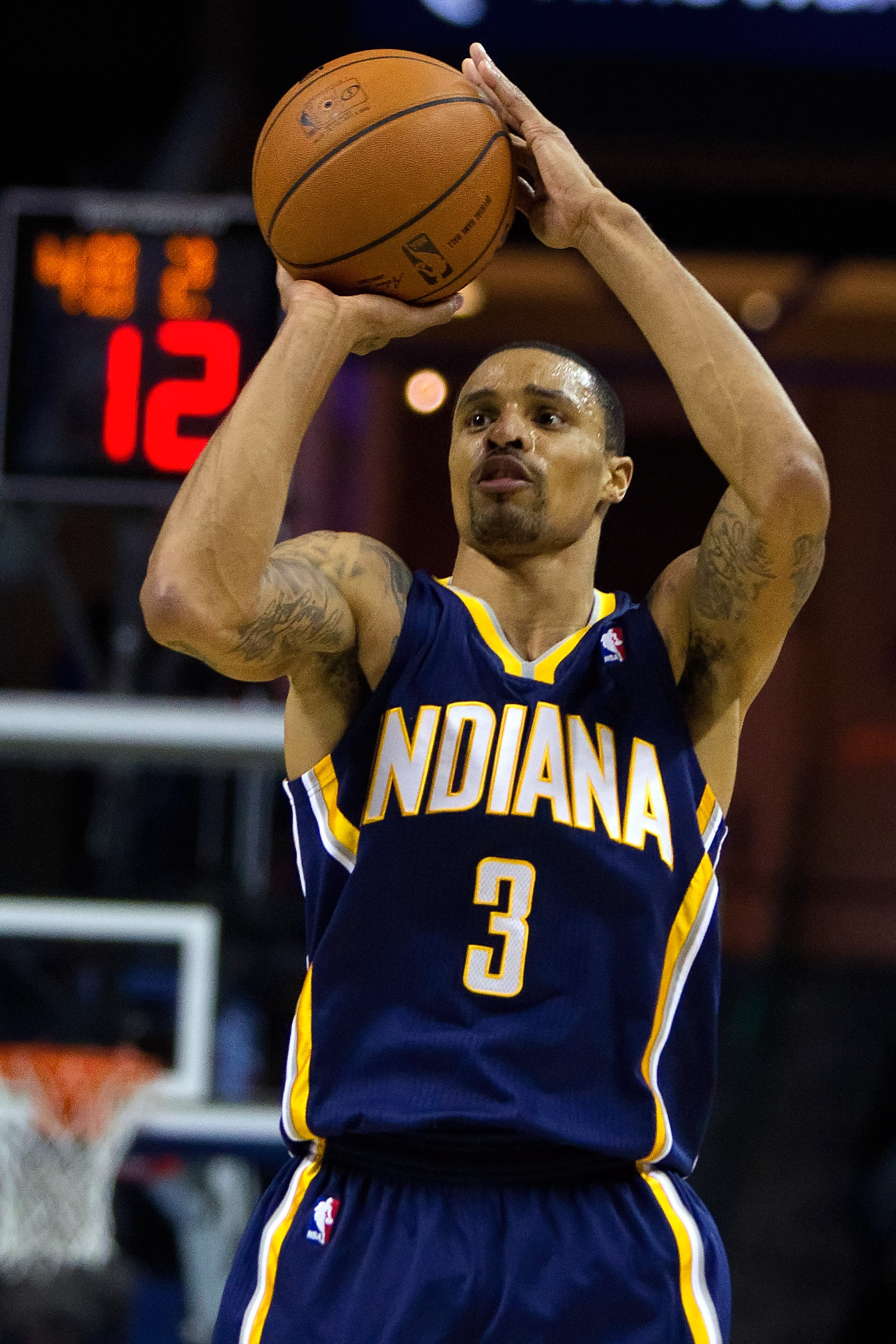
Hill with the Pacers in March 2014

During the 2012–13 season, Hill made a game-winning floater against the Toronto Raptors and a game-winning layup over the outstretched arms of Dwight Howard against the Los Angeles Lakers. Hill and the Pacers appeared in the Eastern Conference Finals, but lost to the defending champion Miami Heat in 7 games.

Hill perhaps had the best game of his NBA career on February 7, 2014, when he scored a career-high 37 points in a win against the Portland Trail Blazers along with 9 rebounds and 8 assists including a game-tying three-pointer to force the game to overtime.

After missing the first 28 games of the season with a left knee injury, Hill returned to action on December 23 against the New Orleans Pelicans. In just over 21 minutes of action off the bench, he recorded 15 points, 4 rebounds, 3 assists and 1 steal in the 96–84 win.

On February 27, 2015, Hill recorded his first career triple-double with 15 points, 10 rebounds and 12 assists in a 93–86 win over the Cleveland Cavaliers. On March 14, he scored a season-high 30 points in an 89–93 loss to the Boston Celtics.

On February 19, 2016, Hill had nine points and nine assists and matched a career-high with 11 rebounds in the Pacers' 101–98 win over the Oklahoma City Thunder.

=== Utah Jazz (2016–2017) ===
On July 7, 2016, Hill was traded to the Utah Jazz in a three-team deal involving the Pacers and the Atlanta Hawks. He made his debut for the Jazz in their season opener on October 25 against the Portland Trail Blazers, recording 19 points and six assists in a 113–104 loss. On November 7, he was named Western Conference Player of the Week for games played Monday, October 31 through Sunday, November 6. Hill helped the Jazz to a 3–1 week behind averages of 20.8 points, 5.8 assists and 3.3 rebounds. On November 23, he scored 22 points in his return from an eight-game absence, as the Jazz snapped a four-game losing streak with a 108–83 win over the Denver Nuggets. On December 29, he returned to action against the Philadelphia 76ers after missing 13 games with a sprained toe. On January 21, 2017, he scored a season-high 30 points in a 109–100 win over the Pacers. On March 3, 2017, he set a new season high with 34 points in a 112–97 win over the Brooklyn Nets.

=== Sacramento Kings (2017–2018) ===
On July 10, 2017, Hill signed a three-year deal worth a reported $57 million with the Sacramento Kings. The deal was fully guaranteed for its first two seasons, with only $1 million guaranteed for the 2019–20 season.

=== Cleveland Cavaliers (2018) ===
On February 8, 2018, Hill was acquired by the Cleveland Cavaliers in a three-team trade that also involved the Kings and the Utah Jazz.

The Cavaliers made their 4th straight Finals appearance this season. In Game 1, Hill missed a game winning free throw attempt in regulation. Teammate J. R. Smith got Hill's free-throw rebound with 4.7 seconds left in regulation time. The game was tied, meaning that a field goal would have won the game. Smith, apparently confused and, thinking the Cavaliers were winning, attempted to dribble out the clock before realizing his error and frantically passing to Hill with 1.2 seconds left, in front of a visibly irate LeBron James. The Cavaliers lost 124–114 in overtime, and eventually lost the Finals in four games to the defending champion Golden State Warriors.

=== Milwaukee Bucks (2018–2020) ===
On December 7, 2018, Hill was traded to the Milwaukee Bucks in a five-player, three-team deal that also included the Washington Wizards. Hill and the Bucks appeared in the Eastern Conference Finals (the franchise's first since 2000–01), but were defeated in 6 games by the eventual champion Toronto Raptors. Following the 2019 season, Hill signed a 3-year, $29 million contract to remain with the Milwaukee Bucks. On October 28, 2019, Hill scored 19 points and grabbed 8 rebounds in a 129–112 win over his former team, the Cavaliers. In his first full season with the Bucks in 2019–20, he led the NBA in three-point field goal percentage. Hill was integral in organizing a wildcat strike of players during the 2020 NBA bubble in response to the shooting of Jacob Blake and other instances of police violence. Despite finishing with the best record in the Eastern Conference at 56–17, the Bucks were defeated in the NBA Bubble during the Conference Semifinals by the 5th seeded Miami Heat in 5 games.

=== Oklahoma City Thunder (2020–2021) ===
On November 24, 2020, Hill was traded to the Oklahoma City Thunder in a four team deal also involving the New Orleans Pelicans and Denver Nuggets. On January 24, 2021, Hill fractured his right thumb in what would be his last game for the Thunder, and eventually underwent surgery.

=== Philadelphia 76ers (2021) ===
On March 25, 2021, Hill was traded to the Philadelphia 76ers. On August 3, he was waived by the 76ers.

=== Return to Milwaukee (2021–2023) ===
On August 6, 2021, Hill returned to the Milwaukee Bucks on a 2-year, $8 million contract. On April 8, 2022, Hill suffered an abdominal strain in a game against the Detroit Pistons, and was ruled out indefinitely. On May 7, Hill returned to Milwaukee's rotation, playing 11 minutes during a 103–101 Game 3 win over the Boston Celtics in the second round.

=== Return to Indiana (2023) ===
On February 9, 2023, Hill was traded back to his hometown Indiana Pacers alongside Jordan Nwora and Serge Ibaka in a four-team trade involving the Brooklyn Nets and Phoenix Suns, reuniting him with his hometown team after seven years.

== Player profile ==
On draft day, ESPN reported that Hill had a 6'9" wingspan. Hill's athleticism, length, and strength are among his greatest assets; going into the NBA he was said to have "NBA-ready" defense but to still need improvement offensively.

Spurs head coach Gregg Popovich said, "He does a little bit of everything. The great thing about him is that he's a very good all-around basketball player, he's a tenacious defender, he can score, he can run, he's a good passer, he knows how to play and he's really a team guy". When asked on multiple occasions which current NBA player he most resembled, Hill picked Monta Ellis, adding that he saw himself as a combo guard and an energy player who enjoys playing defense and getting into the passing lanes. Hill was drafted by the Spurs to back up All-Star Tony Parker at point guard.

== Career statistics ==
Legend
GP	Games played	GS	Games started	MPG	Minutes per game
FG%	Field goal percentage	3P%	3-point field goal percentage	FT%	Free throw percentage
RPG	Rebounds per game	APG	Assists per game	SPG	Steals per game
BPG	Blocks per game	PPG	Points per game	**Bold**	Career high
*	Led the league

=== NBA ===
==== Regular season ====
Year	Team	GP	GS	MPG	FG%	3P%	FT%	RPG	APG	SPG	BPG	PPG
2008–09	San Antonio	77	7	16.5	.403	.329	.781	2.1	1.8	.6	.3	5.7
2009–10	San Antonio	**78**	43	29.2	.478	.399	.772	2.6	2.9	.9	.3	12.4
2010–11	San Antonio	76	5	28.3	.453	.377	.863	2.6	2.5	.9	.3	11.6
2011–12	Indiana	50	9	25.5	.442	.367	.778	3.0	2.9	.8	.3	9.6
2012–13	Indiana	76	**76**	**34.5**	.443	.368	.817	3.7	4.7	**1.1**	.3	14.2
2013–14	Indiana	76	**76**	32.0	.442	.365	.807	3.7	3.5	1.0	.3	10.3
2014–15	Indiana	43	36	29.5	.477	.358	.790	**4.2**	**5.1**	1.0	.3	16.1
2015–16	Indiana	74	73	34.1	.441	.406	.760	4.0	3.5	**1.1**	.2	12.1
2016–17	Utah	49	49	31.5	.477	.403	.801	3.4	4.2	1.0	.2	**16.9**
2017–18	Sacramento	43	36	26.6	.469	.453	.778	2.7	2.8	.9	.3	10.3
2017–18	Cleveland	24	24	27.9	.444	.351	.805	2.7	2.8	.9	**.6**	9.4
2018–19	Cleveland	13	13	26.5	.514	.464	.850	2.1	2.8	.9	.1	10.8
2018–19	Milwaukee	47	0	20.4	.428	.280	.815	2.6	2.1	.9	.1	6.8
2019–20	Milwaukee	59	2	21.5	.516	.460*	.842	3.0	3.1	.8	.1	9.4
2020–21	Oklahoma City	14	14	26.4	.508	.386	.840	2.1	3.1	.9	.1	11.8
2020–21	Philadelphia	16	3	18.9	.442	.391	.760	2.0	1.9	.7	.2	6.0
2021–22	Milwaukee	54	17	23.2	.429	.306	**.919**	2.9	2.2	.8	.1	6.2
2022–23	Milwaukee	35	0	19.1	.447	.311	.739	1.9	2.5	.5	.1	5.0
2022–23	Indiana	11	1	15.1	**.559**	**.524**	.889	1.6	1.9	.6	.3	5.2
Career		915	484	26.8	.457	.380	.806	3.0	3.1	.9	.3	10.4

==== Playoffs ====
Year	Team	GP	GS	MPG	FG%	3P%	FT%	RPG	APG	SPG	BPG	PPG
2009	San Antonio	4	0	19.0	.333	.375	.857	2.0	.5	.5	**.3**	5.8
2010	San Antonio	10	8	34.4	.451	.379	.838	3.1	.7	1.0	.2	13.4
2011	San Antonio	6	1	31.5	.400	.267	.867	**5.0**	2.3	**1.5**	**.3**	11.7
2012	Indiana	11	11	31.5	.448	.375	.848	2.3	2.9	1.2	**.3**	13.5
2013	Indiana	18	18	**38.1**	.401	.358	.829	3.7	**4.3**	1.2	.2	14.6
2014	Indiana	**19**	**19**	36.2	.444	.364	.721	3.7	3.0	1.2	.2	12.1
2016	Indiana	7	7	33.6	**.561**	.481	.818	2.7	2.1	.9	.1	13.6
2017	Utah	8	8	35.1	.469	.387	.724	4.1	3.6	.3	.1	**15.6**
2018	Cleveland	**19**	18	29.3	.450	.314	.774	2.2	2.2	.5	.4	9.2
2019	Milwaukee	15	0	26.3	.534	.417	.818	3.5	2.8	.9	.3	11.5
2020	Milwaukee	10	1	26.8	.478	.357	.808	2.4	3.1	.6	.0	9.5
2021	Philadelphia	12	0	17.1	.442	.421	.769	1.3	1.5	.7	.3	4.7
2022	Milwaukee	5	0	15.3	.200	**.500**	**1.000**	1.2	.6	.0	.0	1.0
Career		144	91	30.2	.452	.372	.802	3.0	2.6	.9	.2	11.1

=== College ===
Year	Team	GP	GS	MPG	FG%	3P%	FT%	RPG	APG	SPG	BPG	PPG
2004–05	IUPUI	29	21	28.4	52.3	41.2	70.9	4.5	2.2	1.4	.2	10.7
2005–06	IUPUI	29	29	35.1	51.8	32.0	79.8	6.0	3.6	1.7	.3	18.9
2006–07	IUPUI	5	5	28.4	50.9	30.8	65.2	5.4	2.0	1.6	.0	14.6
2007–08	IUPUI	**32**	**32**	**36.8**	**54.5**	**45.0**	**81.2**	**6.8**	**4.3**	**1.8**	**.4**	**21.5**
Career		95	87	33.3	52.9	40.4	78.5	5.8	3.3	1.6	0.3	17.0

== Personal life ==
On January 16, 2016, Hill's girlfriend, Samantha, gave birth to the couple's first child, Zayden Jaxon Hill. On January 4, 2018, Samantha gave birth to their second child, Zoë Jessie Hill. They were married August 13, 2018. Hill received his diploma from IUPUI from the School of Liberal Arts on May 12, 2018. He was one of two student speakers to address the new graduates.

Hill owns an 850-acre ranch in Texas Hill Country, a 35-minute drive north of his offseason home in San Antonio. He employs 16 ranch workers to tend to the big herbivores he houses on his ranch. There are dozens of species on the ranch such as fallow deer, sables, kangaroos, wildebeests, donkeys, elk, antelope, scimitar oryx, Arabian oryx, red lechwes, New Zealand red stags, kudus, ostriches, and zebras among others.
