= 2010–11 San Antonio Spurs season =

- Division champions
- Head coach: Gregg Popovich
- General manager: R.C. Buford
- Owners: Peter Holt
- Arena: AT&T Center

Results
- Record: 61–21 (.744)
- Place: Division: 1st (Southwest); Conference: 1st (Western)
- Playoff finish: First Round (lost to Grizzlies 2–4)
- Stats at Basketball Reference

Local media
- Television: FS Southwest; KENS; KMYS
- Radio: WOAI; KCOR (in Spanish)

The 2010–11 San Antonio Spurs season was the 44th season of the franchise, 38th in San Antonio and 35th in the National Basketball Association (NBA).

In the playoffs, the Spurs lost to the eighth-seeded Memphis Grizzlies in six games in the First Round, becoming the fourth number one seed in league history to lose a playoffs series against a number eight seed, following the Seattle SuperSonics in 1994, the Miami Heat in 1999, and the Dallas Mavericks in 2007.

== Key dates ==
- June 24 – The 2010 NBA draft was held in New York City.
- July 1 – The free agency period started.
- July 12–18 – The Spurs took part in the 2010 NBA Summer League in Las Vegas.
- September 28 – The Spurs began their annual training camp at their practice facility.
- October 7 – The Spurs opened their preseason schedule with an 87–90 defeat in a road game against the Houston Rockets.
- October 28 – The Spurs won their regular season opening game at home versus the Indiana Pacers with a final score of 122–109.
- February 18–20 – The 2011 NBA All-Star Weekend took place in Los Angeles.
- February 24 – Trade deadline, 3 p.m. ET.

== Summary ==
=== Offseason ===
==== Draft ====
The Spurs entered the Draft with their two original picks. They used the 20th overall pick to select James Anderson, junior guard from Oklahoma State. Anderson had been named the Big 12 Player of the Year and a Second Team All-American by the Associated Press, averaging 22.3 points, 5.8 rebounds, 2.4 assists and 1.4 steals in 33 games. With the 49th pick the Spurs chose Ryan Richards, a 6-11 forward from England. The Spurs went on to sign Anderson on July 23.

Round	Pick	Player	Position	Nationality	School/club team
1	20	James Anderson	Guard	United States	Oklahoma State (Jr.)
2	49	Ryan Richards	Forward	United Kingdom	CB Gran Canaria (Spain) 1991

==== Free agency ====
Entering the offseason, four Spurs players were unrestricted free agents: Keith Bogans, Matt Bonner, Ian Mahinmi and Roger Mason. Additionally, Richard Jefferson exercised the early termination option on the final year of his contract and he too became an unrestricted free agent. Jefferson, however, re-signed with the Spurs to a less remunerative but longer deal shortly after. The Spurs also re-signed Bonner, which was considered a top priority by general manager R.C. Buford, while Bogans, Mahinmi and Mason signed with the Chicago Bulls, the Dallas Mavericks and the New York Knicks respectively. Following his performances as a member of their Summer League squad in July, when he led the team in scoring, the Spurs signed free agent Gary Neal. The 6-6 guard had gone undrafted in the 2007 NBA draft and spent the next three season playing in Europe.

=== Pre-season ===
The Spurs announced their training camp roster on September 27, one day before the start of the training camp itself. The 18-man roster included the additions of Marcus Cousin, Thomas Gardner, Bobby Simmons and the Spurs 2008 draft pick James Gist. The Spurs also announced an addition to their coaching staff, as former Spurs player Jacque Vaughn was named an assistant coach. Kirk Penney joined the training camp on September 28, while Gardner was waived two days later, leaving the roster size unaffected.

=== Playoffs ===
After finishing the season as the #1 seed in the West, the San Antonio Spurs faced the Memphis Grizzlies in the first round of the playoffs. Little did everyone know how dangerous Memphis was in the postseason. The Spurs were forced to play game 1 without Manu Ginobili, as he sat out with a sprained elbow. As a result, Memphis won game 1, stealing home court advantage from the Spurs. The Spurs then rebounded in game 2 with a win. However, things deteriorated as the series shifted to Memphis for the Spurs, as the Grizzlies took both games 3 and 4, putting San Antonio on the brink of getting knocked out in the first round. Game 5 shifted back to San Antonio. A memorable moment for this game was when Gary Neal hit a 3-pointer as the buzzer sounded to end the game, forcing overtime, in which San Antonio got a needed win for game 5. However, game 6 went back to Memphis, and the Spurs faced their demise by being knocked in the first round in six games. This is the second time in NBA history that a #8 seed knocks off a #1 seed in a seven-game format.

== Roster ==
San Antonio Spurs roster
Players

Pos.	No.	Player	Height	Weight	DOB	From
G/F	25	James Anderson	6 ft 6 in (1.98 m)	213 lb (97 kg)		Oklahoma State
F/C	45	DeJuan Blair	6 ft 7 in (2.01 m)	270 lb (122 kg)		Pittsburgh
F/C	15	Matt Bonner	6 ft 10 in (2.08 m)	235 lb (107 kg)		Florida
F/C	21	Tim Duncan	6 ft 11 in (2.11 m)	248 lb (112 kg)		Wake Forest
G	20	Manu Ginóbili	6 ft 6 in (1.98 m)	210 lb (95 kg)		Argentina
G	4	Danny Green	6 ft 6 in (1.98 m)	215 lb (98 kg)		North Carolina
G	3	George Hill	6 ft 3 in (1.91 m)	188 lb (85 kg)		IUPUI
F	24	Richard Jefferson	6 ft 7 in (2.01 m)	233 lb (106 kg)		Arizona
F/C	34	Antonio McDyess	6 ft 9 in (2.06 m)	220 lb (100 kg)		Alabama
G	14	Gary Neal	6 ft 4 in (1.93 m)	210 lb (95 kg)		Towson
F	23	Steve Novak	6 ft 10 in (2.08 m)	225 lb (102 kg)		Marquette
G	9	Tony Parker	6 ft 2 in (1.88 m)	180 lb (82 kg)		France
G	11	Chris Quinn	6 ft 2 in (1.88 m)	185 lb (84 kg)		Notre Dame
F/C	22	Tiago Splitter	6 ft 11 in (2.11 m)	245 lb (111 kg)		Brazil

Coaches
Head coach
- Gregg Popovich (Air Force)
Assistant(s)
- Brett Brown (Boston University)
- Mike Budenholzer (Pomona)
- Chip Engelland (Duke)
- Chad Forcier (Seattle Pacific)
- Don Newman (Idaho)
- Jacque Vaughn (Kansas)

Legend
- (DP) Unsigned draft pick
- (FA) Free agent
- (S) Suspended
- Injured

Roster

=== Depth chart ===
Pos.	Starter	Bench	Reserve	Inactive
C	Antonio McDyess	DeJuan Blair
PF	Tim Duncan	Matt Bonner	Tiago Splitter
SF	Richard Jefferson	Ime Udoka		Da'Sean Butler (NBA DL)
SG	Manu Ginóbili	Gary Neal	James Anderson	Danny Green
PG	Tony Parker	George Hill		Chris Quinn

== Pre-season ==
=== Game log ===
2010 pre-season game log
Pre-season: 4–3 (home: 3–1; road: 1–2)

Game	Date	Team	Score	High points	High rebounds	High assists	Location Attendance	Record
1	October 7	@ Houston	L 87–90	DeJuan Blair (12)	DeJuan Blair, Marcus Cousin (8)	Tony Parker, Manu Ginóbili (5)	Toyota Center; 13,035	0–1
2	October 9	Miami	W 90–73	DeJuan Blair (13)	DeJuan Blair (7)	Manu Ginóbili (6)	AT&T Center; 18,581	1–1
3	October 12	@ L.A. Clippers	W 100–99	DeJuan Blair (21)	Tim Duncan (13)	Tim Duncan, Bobby Simmons, Curtis Jerrells (3)	Palacio de los Deportes; 18,674	2–1
4	October 14	@ Cleveland	L 80–106	Gary Neal (10)	DeJuan Blair (11)	DeJuan Blair (5)	Petersen Events Center; 5,121	2–2
5	October 16	Caja Laboral	W 108–85	Tony Parker (22)	DeJuan Blair (12)	Antonio McDyess (6)	AT&T Center; 15,373	3–2
6	October 18	Oklahoma City	L 102–111	Manu Ginóbili, Tony Parker (17)	DeJuan Blair (9)	Tony Parker, George Hill (6)	AT&T Center; 14,627	3–3
7	October 21	Houston	W 111–103	DeJuan Blair (17)	Tim Duncan (10)	Tim Duncan, George Hill, Garrett Temple (4)	AT&T Center; 15,356	4–3

2010–11 season schedule

== Regular season ==
=== Standings ===
Southwest Division	W	L	PCT	GB	Home	Road	Div
c-San Antonio Spurs	61	21	.744	–	36–5	25–16	10–6
x-Dallas Mavericks	57	25	.695	4	29–12	28–13	8–8
x-New Orleans Hornets	46	36	.561	15	28–13	18–23	9–7
x-Memphis Grizzlies	46	36	.561	15	30–11	16–25	8–8
Houston Rockets	43	39	.524	18	25–16	18–23	5–11

#	Western Conference				
#	Team	W	L	PCT	GB
1	c-San Antonio Spurs	61	21	.744	–
2	y-Los Angeles Lakers	57	25	.695	4
3	x-Dallas Mavericks	57	25	.695	4
4	y-Oklahoma City Thunder	55	27	.671	6
5	x-Denver Nuggets	50	32	.610	11
6	x-Portland Trail Blazers	48	34	.585	13
7	x-New Orleans Hornets	46	36	.561	15
8	x-Memphis Grizzlies	46	36	.561	15
9	Houston Rockets	43	39	.524	18
10	Phoenix Suns	40	42	.488	21
11	Utah Jazz	39	43	.476	22
12	Golden State Warriors	36	46	.439	25
13	Los Angeles Clippers	32	50	.390	29
14	Sacramento Kings	24	58	.293	37
15	Minnesota Timberwolves	17	65	.207	44

=== Game log ===
2010–11 game log
Total: 61–21 (home: 36–5; road: 25–16)
October: 1–1 (home: 1–1; road: 0–0)

Game	Date	Team	Score	High points	High rebounds	High assists	Location Attendance	Record
1	October 27	Indiana	W 122–109	Tim Duncan (23)	Tim Duncan (12)	Tony Parker (9)	AT&T Center; 18,581	1–0
2	October 30	New Orleans	L 90–99	Manu Ginóbili (23)	DeJuan Blair (11)	George Hill (7)	AT&T Center; 18,581	1–1

November: 14–1 (home: 6–1; road: 8–0)

Game	Date	Team	Score	High points	High rebounds	High assists	Location Attendance	Record
3	November 1	@ L.A. Clippers	W 97–88	Tony Parker (19)	Antonio McDyess (10)	Tony Parker (9)	Staples Center; 14,964	2–1
4	November 3	@ Phoenix	W 112–110	Richard Jefferson (28)	Tim Duncan (17)	Tony Parker (6)	US Airways Center; 17,060	3–1
5	November 6	Houston	W 124–121 (OT)	Manu Ginóbili (28)	Tim Duncan (11)	Tony Parker (14)	AT&T Center; 17,740	4–1
6	November 8	@ Charlotte	W 95–91	Manu Ginóbili (26)	Tim Duncan (10)	Tony Parker (8)	Time Warner Cable Arena; 14,152	5–1
7	November 10	L.A. Clippers	W 107–95	Manu Ginóbili, Richard Jefferson (22)	Antonio McDyess (9)	Tony Parker (9)	AT&T Center; 17,309	6–1
8	November 13	Philadelphia	W 116–93	Tony Parker (24)	DeJuan Blair (12)	Tony Parker (7)	AT&T Center; 17,627	7–1
9	November 14	@ Oklahoma City	W 117–104	Tony Parker (24)	DeJuan Blair (11)	George Hill (5)	Oklahoma City Arena; 18,203	8–1
10	November 17	Chicago	W 103–94	Tony Parker (21)	Tim Duncan (18)	Tony Parker (7)	AT&T Center; 18,581	9–1
11	November 19	@ Utah	W 94–82	Tony Parker (24)	Tim Duncan (14)	Tony Parker (7)	EnergySolutions Arena; 19,332	10–1
12	November 20	Cleveland	W 116–92	Tony Parker (19)	DeJuan Blair (9)	Tony Parker (9)	AT&T Center; 16,982	11–1
13	November 22	Orlando	W 106–97	Manu Ginóbili (25)	Matt Bonner (7)	Tony Parker (10)	AT&T Center; 17,627	12–1
14	November 24	@ Minnesota	W 113–109 (OT)	Manu Ginóbili (26)	Tim Duncan (13)	Manu Ginóbili, Tony Parker (6)	Target Center; 13,117	13–1
15	November 26	Dallas	L 94–103	Manu Ginóbili (31)	Tim Duncan (8)	Manu Ginóbili, Tim Duncan (4)	AT&T Center; 18,581	13–2
16	November 28	@ New Orleans	W 109–95	Manu Ginóbili (23)	Tim Duncan, Manu Ginóbili, Antonio McDyess (7)	Tony Parker (9)	New Orleans Arena; 12,449	14–2
17	November 30	@ Golden State	W 118–98	Manu Ginóbili (27)	Tim Duncan (18)	Tim Duncan (11)	Oracle Arena; 17,877	15–2

December: 13–2 (home: 11–0; road: 2–2)

Game	Date	Team	Score	High points	High rebounds	High assists	Location Attendance	Record
18	December 1	@ L.A. Clippers	L 85–90	George Hill (17)	Richard Jefferson (9)	Manu Ginóbili (6)	Staples Center; 16,584	15–3
19	December 3	Minnesota	W 107–101	Tim Duncan (22)	Tim Duncan, Richard Jefferson (10)	Tim Duncan (5)	AT&T Center; 18,581	16–3
20	December 5	New Orleans	W 109–84	Tony Parker (19)	Tim Duncan (9)	Tony Parker (6)	AT&T Center; 17,571	17–3
21	December 8	Golden State	W 111–94	Tony Parker (19)	DeJuan Blair (13)	Tony Parker (9)	AT&T Center; 16,913	18–3
22	December 10	Atlanta	W 108–92	Manu Ginóbili, Richard Jefferson (18)	DeJuan Blair (12)	Tony Parker (6)	AT&T Center; 17,576	19–3
23	December 12	Portland	W 95–78	George Hill (22)	Tim Duncan (13)	Tony Parker (6)	AT&T Center; 16,743	20–3
24	December 15	Milwaukee	W 92–90	Manu Ginóbili (26)	Tim Duncan (11)	Tony Parker (8)	AT&T Center; 17,644	21–3
25	December 16	@ Denver	W 113–112	Tim Duncan (28)	Tim Duncan (16)	Tony Parker (9)	Pepsi Center; 16,190	22–3
26	December 18	Memphis	W 112–106 (OT)	Tony Parker (37)	Tim Duncan (10)	Manu Ginóbili, Tony Parker (9)	AT&T Center; 18,581	23–3
27	December 20	Phoenix	W 118–110	Gary Neal (22)	Tim Duncan (15)	Tim Duncan (6)	AT&T Center; 18,581	24–3
28	December 22	Denver	W 109–103	Manu Ginóbili, Gary Neal (22)	Tim Duncan, Tiago Splitter (9)	Tony Parker (9)	AT&T Center; 18,581	25–3
29	December 23	@ Orlando	L 101–123	Tony Parker (16)	Matt Bonner, Tim Duncan, Richard Jefferson (6)	Manu Ginóbili (6)	Amway Center; 18,916	25–4
30	December 26	Washington	W 94–80	Manu Ginóbili (21)	Tim Duncan, Richard Jefferson (9)	Tony Parker (14)	AT&T Center; 18,581	26–4
31	December 28	L.A. Lakers	W 97–82	Tony Parker (23)	DeJuan Blair (15)	Manu Ginóbili (6)	AT&T Center; 18,581	27–4
32	December 30	@ Dallas	W 99–93	Gary Neal (21)	Tim Duncan (11)	Tony Parker (5)	American Airlines Center; 20,604	28–4

January: 12–3 (home: 7–0; road: 5–3)

Game	Date	Team	Score	High points	High rebounds	High assists	Location Attendance	Record
33	January 1	Oklahoma City	W 101–74	Tim Duncan (21)	DeJuan Blair, Tim Duncan (9)	Tony Parker (10)	AT&T Center; 18,581	29–4
34	January 4	@ New York	L 115–128	Tony Parker (26)	DeJuan Blair (8)	Tony Parker (6)	Madison Square Garden; 19,763	29–5
35	January 5	@ Boston	L 103–105	Manu Ginóbili (24)	Manu Ginóbili (8)	Tony Parker (5)	TD Garden; 18,624	29–6
36	January 7	@ Indiana	W 90–87	Manu Ginóbili (25)	Tim Duncan (15)	Manu Ginóbili, George Hill (4)	Conseco Fieldhouse; 14,157	30–6
37	January 9	Minnesota	W 94–91	Manu Ginóbili (21)	Matt Bonner (9)	Tim Duncan (5)	AT&T Center; 18,581	31–6
38	January 11	@ Minnesota	W 107–96	Manu Ginóbili (19)	Manu Ginóbili (9)	Tony Parker (13)	Target Center; 11,209	32–6
39	January 12	@ Milwaukee	W 91–84	Manu Ginóbili (23)	Tim Duncan (8)	Tony Parker (9)	Bradley Center; 14,061	33–6
40	January 14	Dallas	W 101–89	Tony Parker, DeJuan Blair (18)	DeJuan Blair (13)	Tony Parker (6)	AT&T Center; 18,581	34–6
41	January 16	Denver	W 110–97	Tony Parker (30)	Tim Duncan (16)	Manu Ginóbili (7)	AT&T Center; 18,581	35–6
42	January 19	Toronto	W 104–95	Manu Ginóbili (23)	Tim Duncan (12)	Manu Ginóbili (7)	AT&T Center; 18,581	36–6
43	January 21	New York	W 101–92	Tim Duncan, Tony Parker (21)	Tim Duncan (16)	Tony Parker (13)	AT&T Center; 18,581	37–6
44	January 22	@ New Orleans	L 72–96	Tiago Splitter (11)	DeJuan Blair, Tiago Splitter (6)	Manu Ginóbili (6)	New Orleans Arena; 18,023	37–7
45	January 24	@ Golden State	W 113–102	Manu Ginóbili (20)	Antonio McDyess (10)	Tony Parker (11)	Oracle Arena; 18,523	38–7
46	January 26	@ Utah	W 112–105	Manu Ginóbili (26)	DeJuan Blair (9)	Manu Ginóbili (7)	EnergySolutions Arena; 19,911	39–7
47	January 29	Houston	W 108–95	Manu Ginóbili (22)	DeJuan Blair (12)	George Hill, Tony Parker (5)	AT&T Center; 18,581	40–7

February: 9–3 (home: 3–0; road: 6–3)

Game	Date	Team	Score	High points	High rebounds	High assists	Location Attendance	Record
48	February 1	@ Portland	L 86–99	Manu Ginóbili (17)	DeJuan Blair (12)	Tony Parker (4)	Rose Garden; 20,364	40–8
49	February 3	@ L.A. Lakers	W 89–88	Tony Parker (21)	Tim Duncan, Antonio McDyess (8)	Manu Ginóbili (8)	Staples Center; 18,997	41–8
50	February 4	@ Sacramento	W 113–100	Tony Parker (25)	DeJuan Blair (12)	Tony Parker (7)	ARCO Arena; 15,772	42–8
51	February 8	@ Detroit	W 100–89	Tony Parker (19)	DeJuan Blair (12)	Tony Parker (7)	The Palace of Auburn Hills; 16,132	43–8
52	February 9	@ Toronto	W 111–100	DeJuan Blair (28)	DeJuan Blair (11)	Manu Ginóbili (9)	Air Canada Centre; 15,867	44–8
53	February 11	@ Philadelphia	L 71–77	Tim Duncan (16)	DeJuan Blair (14)	Manu Ginóbili (6)	Wells Fargo Center; 15,501	44–9
54	February 12	@ Washington	W 118–94	George Hill, Tony Parker (18)	DeJuan Blair (12)	Tony Parker (8)	Verizon Center; 20,435	45–9
55	February 14	@ New Jersey	W 102–85	Manu Ginóbili (22)	DeJuan Blair, Tim Duncan (11)	Tony Parker (7)	Prudential Center; 13,433	46–9
56	February 17	@ Chicago	L 99–109	Tony Parker (26)	Tim Duncan (9)	Tony Parker (4)	United Center; 22,172	46–10
All-Star Break
57	February 23	Oklahoma City	W 109–105	Tony Parker (20)	Tim Duncan (10)	Manu Ginóbili (9)	AT&T Center; 18,581	47–10
58	February 25	New Jersey	W 106–96	Manu Ginóbili (26)	George Hill, Tony Parker (7)	Tony Parker (10)	AT&T Center; 18,581	48–10
59	February 27	Memphis	W 95–88	Manu Ginóbili (35)	Antonio McDyess (9)	Manu Ginóbili (8)	AT&T Center; 18,581	49–10

March: 8–8 (home: 5–3; road: 3–5)

Game	Date	Team	Score	High points	High rebounds	High assists	Location Attendance	Record
60	March 1	@ Memphis	L 93–109	Gary Neal (14)	Tim Duncan (8)	Manu Ginóbili (7)	FedExForum; 13,480	49–11
61	March 2	@ Cleveland	W 109–99	George Hill (22)	DeJuan Blair (10)	Tim Duncan, Manu Ginóbili (6)	Quicken Loans Arena; 18,795	50–11
62	March 4	Miami	W 125–95	Manu Ginóbili (20)	Tim Duncan (14)	Tony Parker (8)	AT&T Center; 18,581	51–11
63	March 6	L.A. Lakers	L 83–99	Gary Neal (15)	DeJuan Blair (12)	Gary Neal (4)	AT&T Center; 18,996	51–12
64	March 9	Detroit	W 111–104	Tony Parker (23)	Tim Duncan (12)	Tony Parker (7)	AT&T Center; 18,581	52–12
65	March 11	Sacramento	W 108–103	Tony Parker (27)	Tim Duncan (10)	Manu Ginóbili (7)	AT&T Center; 18,712	53–12
66	March 12	@ Houston	W 115–107	Tony Parker (21)	Antonio McDyess (12)	Tony Parker (6)	Toyota Center; 18,245	54–12
67	March 14	@ Miami	L 80–110	Tony Parker (18)	Tim Duncan, Manu Ginóbili (6)	Manu Ginóbili, Tony Parker (5)	American Airlines Arena; 20,021	54–13
68	March 18	@ Dallas	W 97–91	Tony Parker (33)	Tim Duncan (8)	Manu Ginóbili (5)	American Airlines Center; 20,614	55–13
69	March 19	Charlotte	W 109–98	Steve Novak (19)	DeJuan Blair, Tiago Splitter (6)	George Hill, Tony Parker (9)	AT&T Center; 19,075	56–13
70	March 21	Golden State	W 111–96	Manu Ginóbili (28)	Tiago Splitter (14)	Tony Parker (15)	AT&T Center; 18,443	57–13
71	March 23	@ Denver	L 112–115	Gary Neal (25)	Antonio McDyess (12)	Tony Parker (5)	Pepsi Center; 19,155	57–14
72	March 25	@ Portland	L 96–98	Manu Ginóbili (21)	Antonio McDyess (8)	Manu Ginóbili (7)	Rose Garden; 20,644	57–15
73	March 27	@ Memphis	L 104–111	George Hill (30)	DeJuan Blair (6)	Tony Parker (6)	FedExForum; 17,098	57–16
74	March 28	Portland	L 92–100	George Hill (27)	Tiago Splitter (9)	George Hill (6)	AT&T Center; 18,583	57–17
75	March 31	Boston	L 97–107	Tony Parker (23)	Tim Duncan (13)	Tony Parker (8)	AT&T Center; 18,583	57–18

April: 4–3 (home: 3–0; road: 1–3)

Game	Date	Team	Score	High points	High rebounds	High assists	Location Attendance	Record
76	April 1	@ Houston	L 114–119 (OT)	Tony Parker (31)	Tim Duncan (13)	Manu Ginóbili, Tony Parker (6)	Toyota Center; 18,059	57–19
77	April 3	Phoenix	W 114–97	George Hill (29)	Matt Bonner (11)	Tony Parker (8)	AT&T Center; 18,581	58–19
78	April 5	@ Atlanta	W 97–90	Tony Parker (26)	Matt Bonner, Tim Duncan, Antonio McDyess (6)	Manu Ginóbili, Tony Parker (4)	Philips Arena; 17,277	59–19
79	April 6	Sacramento	W 124–92	Manu Ginóbili (25)	DeJuan Blair, Tim Duncan (8)	Tony Parker (6)	AT&T Center; 18,590	60–19
80	April 9	Utah	W 111–102	Richard Jefferson (20)	Tiago Splitter (8)	Tony Parker (7)	AT&T Center; 18,802	61–19
81	April 12	@ L.A. Lakers	L 93–102	Gary Neal (16)	DeJuan Blair (11)	Chris Quinn (9)	Staples Center; 18,997	61–20
82	April 13	@ Phoenix	L 103–106	Tim Duncan (17)	Tim Duncan (12)	Tony Parker (7)	US Airways Center; 18,195	61–21

2010–11 season schedule

== Playoffs ==
=== Game log ===
2011 playoff game log
First Round: 2–4 (home: 2–1; road: 0–3)

Game	Date	Team	Score	High points	High rebounds	High assists	Location Attendance	Series
1	April 17	Memphis	L 98–101	Tony Parker (20)	Tim Duncan (13)	Tony Parker (5)	AT&T Center; 18,581	0–1
2	April 20	Memphis	W 93–87	Manu Ginóbili (17)	Tim Duncan (10)	Tony Parker (7)	AT&T Center; 18,581	1–1
3	April 23	@ Memphis	L 88–91	Manu Ginóbili (23)	Tim Duncan (11)	Tim Duncan (6)	FedExForum; 18,119	1–2
4	April 25	@ Memphis	L 86–104	Tony Parker (23)	Tiago Splitter (9)	Manu Ginóbili (4)	FedExForum; 18,119	1–3
5	April 27	Memphis	W 110–103 (OT)	Manu Ginóbili (33)	Tim Duncan (12)	Tony Parker (9)	AT&T Center; 18,581	2–3
6	April 29	@ Memphis	L 91–99	Tony Parker (23)	Tim Duncan (10)	Tony Parker (4)	FedExForum; 18,119	2–4

2011 playoff schedule

== Player statistics ==
=== Regular season ===
Player	POS	GP	GS	MP	REB	AST	STL	BLK	PTS	MPG	RPG	APG	SPG	BPG	PPG
Richard Jefferson	SF	81	81	2,459	310	107	38	34	891	30.4	3.8	1.3	.5	.4	11.0
DeJuan Blair	PF	81	65	1,734	565	77	95	42	674	21.4	7.0	1.0	1.2	.5	8.3
Manu Ginóbili	SG	80	79	2,426	295	393	123	28	1,393	30.3	3.7	4.9	1.5	.4	17.4
Gary Neal	SG	80	1	1,685	196	96	27	4	783	21.1	2.5	1.2	.3	.1	9.8
Tony Parker	PG	78	78	2,528	238	513	90	3	1,368	32.4	3.1	6.6	1.2	.0	17.5
Tim Duncan	C	76	76	2,156	678	203	50	146	1,022	28.4	8.9	2.7	.7	1.9	13.4
George Hill	PG	76	5	2,148	199	193	66	21	884	28.3	2.6	2.5	.9	.3	11.6
Antonio McDyess	PF	73	16	1,387	395	84	36	39	390	19.0	5.4	1.2	.5	.5	5.3
Matt Bonner	PF	66	1	1,432	239	60	26	21	481	21.7	3.6	.9	.4	.3	7.3
Tiago Splitter	C	60	6	738	201	26	29	17	278	12.3	3.4	.4	.5	.3	4.6
Chris Quinn	PG	41	0	292	25	42	5	1	81	7.1	.6	1.0	.1	.0	2.0
James Anderson	SF	26	2	286	23	18	3	6	94	11.0	.9	.7	.1	.2	3.6
Steve Novak^{†}	SF	23	0	197	23	3	1	5	93	8.6	1.0	.1	.0	.2	4.0
Ime Udoka	SF	20	0	130	19	13	8	1	14	6.5	1.0	.7	.4	.1	.7
Danny Green	SG	8	0	92	15	2	2	1	41	11.5	1.9	.3	.3	.1	5.1
Larry Owens^{†}	SF	7	0	31	4	1	2	0	9	4.4	.6	.1	.3	.0	1.3
Alonzo Gee^{†}	SG	5	0	18	3	0	0	2	2	3.6	.6	.0	.0	.4	.4
Garrett Temple^{†}	SG	3	0	21	2	2	1	1	2	7.0	.7	.7	.3	.3	.7
Bobby Simmons	SF	2	0	16	0	2	0	0	0	8.0	.0	1.0	.0	.0	.0
Othyus Jeffers^{†}	SG	1	0	8	2	1	0	0	2	8.0	2.0	1.0	.0	.0	2.0

- ^{†} Denotes player spent time with another team in the season. Stats reflect time with the Spurs only.

=== Playoffs ===
Player	POS	GP	GS	MP	REB	AST	STL	BLK	PTS	MPG	RPG	APG	SPG	BPG	PPG
Tony Parker	PG	6	6	221	16	31	8	2	118	36.8	2.7	5.2	1.3	.3	19.7
Tim Duncan	C	6	6	212	63	16	3	15	76	35.3	10.5	2.7	.5	2.5	12.7
Richard Jefferson	SF	6	6	176	25	5	3	3	39	29.3	4.2	.8	.5	.5	6.5
Antonio McDyess	PF	6	6	145	30	8	2	5	34	24.2	5.0	1.3	.3	.8	5.7
George Hill	PG	6	1	189	30	14	9	2	70	31.5	5.0	2.3	1.5	.3	11.7
Matt Bonner	PF	6	0	123	19	2	1	1	38	20.5	3.2	.3	.2	.2	6.3
Gary Neal	SG	6	0	111	18	5	1	1	46	18.5	3.0	.8	.2	.2	7.7
Manu Ginóbili	SG	5	5	174	20	21	13	3	103	34.8	4.0	4.2	2.6	.6	20.6
DeJuan Blair	PF	4	0	50	13	2	0	1	17	12.5	3.3	.5	.0	.3	4.3
Danny Green	SG	4	0	7	1	2	1	1	5	1.8	.3	.5	.3	.3	1.3
Tiago Splitter	C	3	0	50	14	1	3	1	20	16.7	4.7	.3	1.0	.3	6.7
Steve Novak	SF	1	0	6	1	0	0	0	0	6.0	1.0	.0	.0	.0	.0

== Awards, records and milestones ==
=== Awards ===
==== Player of the week/month ====
Tony Parker was named Western Conference Player of the Week for games played from December 13 through December 19 and again for games played March 7 through March 13

==== All-Star ====
- Manu Ginóbili was voted as an NBA Western Conference All-Star reserve. (2nd appearance)
- Tim Duncan was voted as an NBA Western Conference All-Star reserve. (13th appearance)

==== Season ====
- Manu Ginóbili was named to the All-NBA Third Team.
- Gary Neal was named to the All-Rookie First Team.

=== Records ===
On November 19, when San Antonio beat the Utah Jazz to go 10–1, it marked the best start to a season in franchise history.

== Transactions ==
=== Free agents ===
==== Additions ====
Player	Signed	Former Team
Richard Jefferson	Signed 4-year contract for $38 million	San Antonio Spurs
Matt Bonner	Signed 4-year contract	San Antonio Spurs
Tiago Splitter	Signed 3-year contract for $10 million	(Spain) Saski Baskonia
Chris Quinn	Terms Undisclosed	(United States) New Jersey Nets
Danny Green	Terms Undisclosed	(United States) San Antonio Spurs
Da'Sean Butler	Terms Undisclosed	(United States) Miami Heat

==== Subtractions ====
Player	Reason Left	New Team
Ian Mahinmi	Free agent	Dallas Mavericks
Roger Mason, Jr.	Free agent	New York Knicks
Keith Bogans	Free agent	Chicago Bulls
Ime Udoka	Waived	
