= DeJuan Blair =

American basketball player (born 1989)

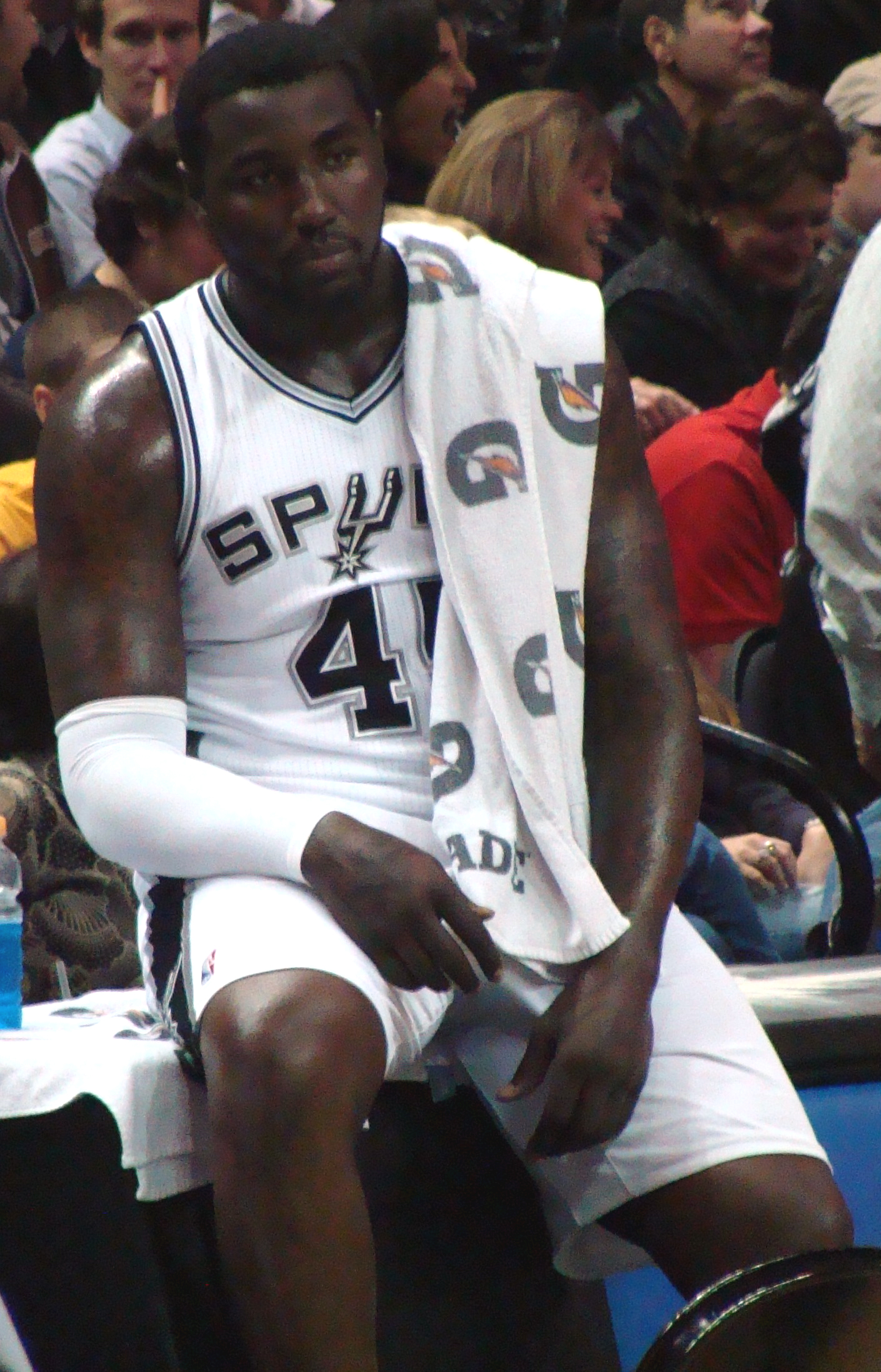
- Blair with the San Antonio Spurs in 2010

Personal information
- Born: April 22, 1989 (age 37) Pittsburgh, Pennsylvania, U.S.
- Listed height: 6 ft 7 in (2.01 m)
- Listed weight: 270 lb (122 kg)

Career information
- High school: Schenley (Pittsburgh, Pennsylvania)
- College: Pittsburgh (2007–2009)
- NBA draft: 2009: 2nd round, 37th overall pick
- Drafted by: San Antonio Spurs
- Playing career: 2009–2019
- Position: Power forward / center
- Number: 45

Career history
- 2009–2013: San Antonio Spurs
- 2011: Krasnye Krylia
- 2013–2014: Dallas Mavericks
- 2014–2016: Washington Wizards
- 2016: Jiangsu Monkey King
- 2017: Texas Legends
- 2017: Los Angeles D-Fenders
- 2017–2018: San Lorenzo de Almagro
- 2018–2019: Austin Spurs

Career highlights
- NBA All-Rookie Second Team (2010); Consensus first-team All-American (2009); Big East co-Player of the Year (2009); First-team All-Big East (2009); Big East co-Rookie of the Year (2008); Big East All-Rookie Team (2008)
- Stats at NBA.com
- Stats at Basketball Reference

DeJuan Lamont Blair (born April 22, 1989) is an American former professional basketball player. He played college basketball for the Pittsburgh Panthers from 2007 to 2009. Blair entered the 2009 NBA draft where he was selected as the 37th overall pick by the San Antonio Spurs. He played in the National Basketball Association (NBA) for seven seasons with the Spurs, Dallas Mavericks and Washington Wizards. Blair also played in the NBA Development League and overseas in Russia, China and Argentina.

== Early life ==
The oldest of four children (one of whom died in infancy), Blair grew up in Pittsburgh's Hill District. Although he was the smallest of his siblings at birth, he was the largest child in his class by the time that he started at Manchester Academic Charter School, where he attended kindergarten through eighth grade. Both of his parents played basketball at Schenley High School, which was located in North Oakland/Schenley Heights until 2008, and his uncle ran the nearby Ammons Recreation Center, where he learned to play the game.

== High school career ==
Blair attended the same school as his parents, Schenley High School. While there, he played for the basketball team and scored 1,563 career points and finished with an overall 103–16 team record, including a 57–0 record within the Pittsburgh City League. He was named the AP player of the state and made first-team all-state his junior and senior year. Blair led Schenley to the 2007 PIAA Class 4A state championship, the first state title for a City League team since 1978; in the final against Chester, he had 18 points, 23 rebounds, and 6 blocked shots. He was also named Pittsburgh City League Player of the year three times.

Blair also played in the summer leagues at Pittsburgh's Kennard Park and played a championship game in which his team played against a team led by future Ohio State quarterback Terrelle Pryor, who was also a highly regarded basketball prospect.

After two surgeries during his high school years, Blair was left without any anterior cruciate ligaments (ACLs) in his knees.

=== Recruiting ===
Blair was heavily recruited coming out of high school. Besides Pitt, other schools pursuing him included Florida, Kansas State, Indiana, Marquette, Miami, West Virginia, Wake Forest, and Tennessee.

His parents admitted that if they had their way, Blair would have gone to Tennessee because they liked the Volunteers' coach Bruce Pearl, and thought it would be a good idea for their son to leave the city. Blair himself had problems making up his mind; while considering as many as 18 different scholarship offers, he was so confused that one day he threw his cell phone across a room, breaking it.

However, Pitt coach Jamie Dixon recognized the importance of Blair's maternal grandmother, Donna Saddler, who had played a major role in his upbringing, and on the first day he was allowed to contact Blair, he called Saddler, asking to come to her house. She told Dixon that they were having a family reunion at the house that day, and invited him to come, which he did. When Dixon was down to his last scholarship in the 2007 recruiting cycle, he called her, telling her that Blair would need to take the scholarship at that time. In the end, Saddler made the decision for him, telling him "Pitt is it." She liked Dixon and the proximity of her home to the school. Also, she was well aware that Pitt would be losing starting center Aaron Gray to graduation, which would have made Blair a likely candidate to start if he attended. He officially announced his decision to attend Pitt at the Ammons Recreation Center, where his basketball journey began, and became the first City League player to play for Pitt since Darelle Porter from 1987 to 1991.

== College career ==
=== 2007–08 ===
Blair became the starter during his freshman year at the University of Pittsburgh. He made the All-American Freshman team, helping the Panthers win the Big East Conference tournament and securing a fourth seed in the NCAA tournament. The Panthers won their first-round game against Oral Roberts, but lost in the second round to fifth-seeded Michigan State. Blair was named the Big East Co-Rookie of the Year, earned All-Big East honorable mention honors, and was named the Big East Rookie of the Week three times. He also set Pitt freshman school records for most starts (36), rebounds (337), and field goals made (168), and became the first freshman in Pitt history to finish with 400+ points and 300+ rebounds.

=== 2008–09 ===
In the 2008–09 season, Blair averaged 15.7 points and 12.3 rebounds per game, helping Pittsburgh earn a number one seed in the NCAA tournament. Blair and Connecticut center Hasheem Thabeet shared co-Big East Player of the Year honors for the 2008–09 season. He was a consensus first-team All-American selection by the Associated Press, USBWA and The Sporting News. He also made the NABC's second team and finished tied for second with Tyler Hansborough (two votes each) for the 2009 Associated Press College Basketball Player of the Year, an award which was won by the eventual first overall pick in the 2009 NBA draft, Blake Griffin (66 votes).

In April 2009, Blair declared for the NBA draft, forgoing his final two years of college eligibility.

=== College statistics ===
Year	Team	GP	GS	MPG	FG%	3P%	FT%	RPG	APG	SPG	BPG	PPG
2007–08	Pittsburgh	37	36	26.0	.537	.000	.624	9.1	.9	1.7	1.1	11.6
2008–09	Pittsburgh	35	35	27.2	.593	.000	.605	12.3	1.2	1.5	1.0	15.7
Career		72	71	26.6	.568	.000	.614	10.7	1.1	1.6	1.0	13.6

== Professional career ==
=== San Antonio Spurs (2009–2013) ===
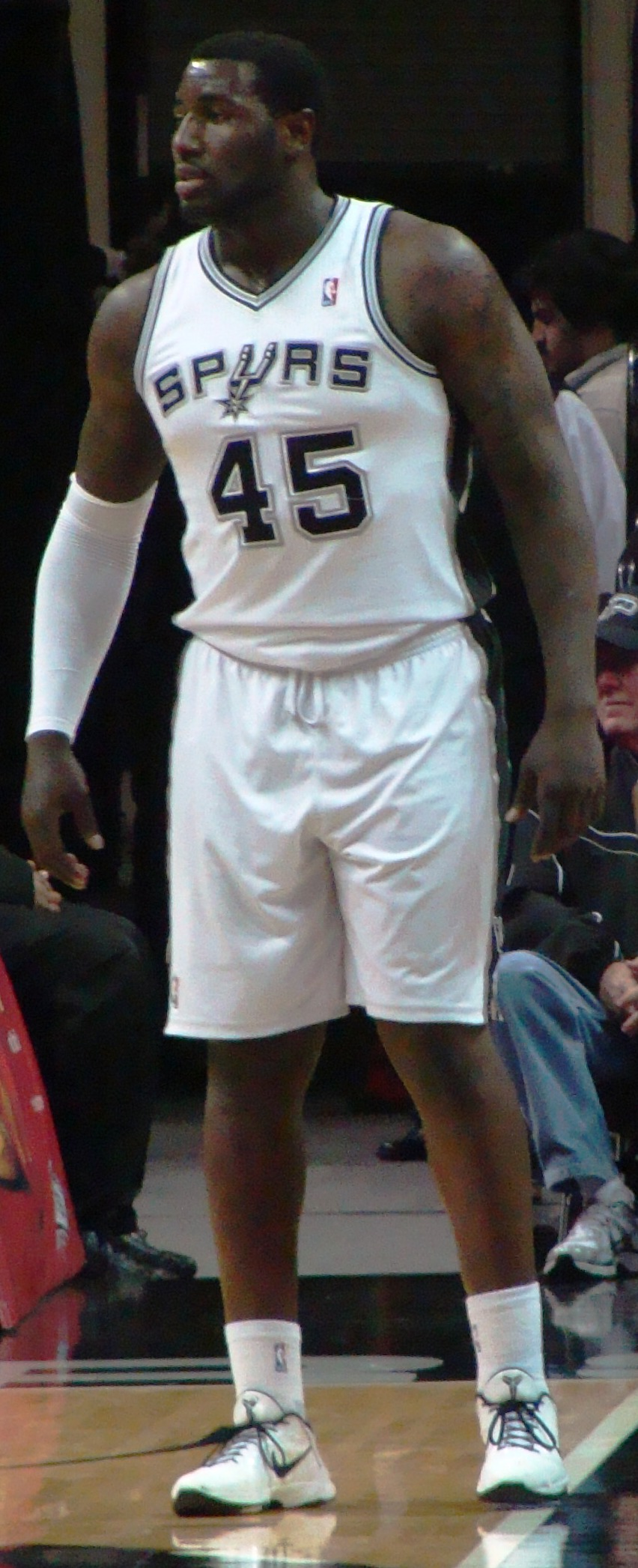
Blair with the Spurs in 2010

On June 25, 2009, Blair was selected by the San Antonio Spurs with 37th overall pick in the 2009 NBA draft. His stock fell because of questions surrounding his durability and knee surgeries. On July 17, he signed a four-year deal with the Spurs. In his first NBA game, he posted a double-double with 14 points and 11 rebounds in 23 minutes against the New Orleans Hornets on October 28, thus becoming just the third Spurs rookie, along with David Robinson and Tim Duncan, to record a double-double in his debut with the team. He later recorded 28 points and 21 rebounds in 31 minutes against the Oklahoma City Thunder on January 13, 2010, becoming first NBA rookie since Tim Duncan in the 1997–98 season to post a 20–20 game. In the team's final regular season game, he recorded 27 points, a season-high 23 rebounds, 4 assists and 3 steals in 37 minutes against the Dallas Mavericks on April 14, becoming the first rookie since Joe Smith in 1995–96 to post two 20–20 games in the same season. Blair also participated in the 2010 Rookie Challenge, where he recorded 22 points and 23 rebounds. Sacramento Kings guard Tyreke Evans won the game MVP award, but graciously offered to share it with Blair. At the season's end, he was named to the NBA All-Rookie Second Team and was the only Spurs player to appear in all 82 regular season games. He started 23 games, averaging 7.8 points and 6.4 rebounds in 18.2 minutes per game. He was also the top-ranked rookie in field goal percentage (.556), and was second in rebounding. Blair helped the Spurs defeat the Mavericks 4–2 in the first round of the playoffs, only to then go on to lose 4–0 to the Phoenix Suns in the second round.

In 2010–11, Blair appeared in 81 games, including 65 starts, averaging 8.3 points, 7.0 rebounds, 1.17 steals, and 1.0 assist in 21.4 minutes per game. He scored in double figures 28 times, including two 20-plus games, and posted 17 double-doubles, with 12 of those coming after the turn of the new year.

In September 2011, Blair signed with BC Krasnye Krylya of Russia for the duration of the 2011 NBA lockout. He was released by the club the following month after appearing in six games. He subsequently returned to the Spurs in December and in 2011–12, he averaged 9.5 points, 5.5 rebounds, and 1.2 assists in 64 games.

The addition of Boris Diaw and emergence of Tiago Splitter led to reduced playing time for Blair and, ultimately, a loss of his starting position during the 2012–13 season. Blair made his displeasure clear as the season progressed and eventually played a minimal role in the Spurs' rotation. The Spurs went on to become Western Conference champions, only to eventually fall 4–3 to the defending champion Miami Heat in the 2013 NBA Finals.

=== Dallas Mavericks (2013–2014) ===
On August 7, 2013, Blair signed a one-year deal with the Dallas Mavericks. In 2013–14, he averaged 6.4 points and 4.7 rebounds in 15.6 minutes of action, playing 78 games (13 starts) while shooting 53.4% (210-of-393 FGs) from the field.

=== Washington Wizards (2014–2016) ===
On July 16, 2014, Blair was acquired by the Washington Wizards in a sign-and-trade deal with the Mavericks, a deal that sent the rights to Emir Preldžić to the Mavericks. In 2014–15, Blair appeared in a career-low 29 games (his previous was 61) and failed to make a start for the first time in his six-year career. He also didn't appear in any of the Wizards' 10 playoff games and was deactivated for most of them.

On February 18, 2016, Blair was traded, along with Kris Humphries and a 2016 protected first-round draft pick, to the Phoenix Suns in exchange for Markieff Morris. Four days later, he was waived by the Suns.

=== Jiangsu Monkey King (2016) ===
On September 7, 2016, Blair signed with Jiangsu Monkey King of the Chinese Basketball Association. In late November 2016, he was cut by the team. In 10 games for Jiangsu, he averaged 24.1 points and 13.6 rebounds per game.

=== Texas Legends and Los Angeles D-Fenders (2017) ===
On January 17, 2017, Blair was acquired by the Texas Legends of the NBA Development League.

On February 11, 2017, Blair was traded by the Legends to the Los Angeles D-Fenders in exchange for a 2017 fourth-round draft pick.

=== San Lorenzo de Almagro (2017–2018) ===
On December 14, 2017, Blair signed with San Lorenzo de Almagro of the Liga Nacional de Básquet.

=== Austin Spurs (2018–2019) ===
On October 20, 2018, Blair was selected by the Austin Spurs in the 2018 NBA G League draft. Blair was later included on Austin's training camp roster.

In Summer 2019, Blair signed a contract with Italian team Carpegna Prosciutti Basket Pesaro, but his contract was voided by Pesaro after his appeal against a two year suspension for testing positive for oxymorphone-oxycodone was rejected by FIBA.

== Overseas Elite (2017) ==
In the summer of 2017, Blair joined two-time The Basketball Tournament defending champion Overseas Elite. On August 3, 2017, Blair's team, Overseas Elite won its third straight The Basketball Tournament championship with an 86–83 victory over Team Challenge ALS on ESPN.

Blair averaged 8.0 points and 4.4 rebounds while shooting 50% from the field in 16.2 minutes per game.

== NBA career statistics ==
Legend
GP	Games played	GS	Games started	MPG	Minutes per game
FG%	Field goal percentage	3P%	3-point field goal percentage	FT%	Free throw percentage
RPG	Rebounds per game	APG	Assists per game	SPG	Steals per game
BPG	Blocks per game	PPG	Points per game	**Bold**	Career high
*	Led the league

=== Regular season ===
Year	Team	GP	GS	MPG	FG%	3P%	FT%	RPG	APG	SPG	BPG	PPG
2009–10	San Antonio	**82***	23	18.2	**.556**	.000	.547	6.4	.8	.6	**.5**	7.8
2010–11	San Antonio	81	**65**	**21.4**	.501	.000	.657	**7.0**	1.0	**1.2**	**.5**	8.3
2011–12	San Antonio	64	62	21.3	.534	.000	.613	5.5	**1.2**	.9	.2	**9.5**
2012–13	San Antonio	61	16	14.0	.524	.000	.629	3.8	.7	.6	.2	5.4
2013–14	Dallas	78	13	15.6	.534	.000	.636	4.7	.9	.8	.3	6.4
2014–15	Washington	29	0	6.2	.456	–	**.667**	1.9	.1	.2	.0	1.9
2015–16	Washington	29	0	7.5	.412	.000	.385	2.0	.4	.3	.1	2.1
Career		424	179	16.6	.524	.000	.608	5.1	.8	.7	.3	6.8

=== Playoffs ===
Year	Team	GP	GS	MPG	FG%	3P%	FT%	RPG	APG	SPG	BPG	PPG
2010	San Antonio	10	0	9.1	.500	–	.556	3.9	.5	.5	**.4**	3.7
2011	San Antonio	4	0	12.5	.333	–	.600	3.3	.5	.0	.3	4.3
2012	San Antonio	10	0	7.6	**.630**	–	.500	2.3	.2	.3	.1	3.7
2013	San Antonio	**12**	0	6.3	.618	–	.556	2.0	**.6**	.4	.1	3.9
2014	Dallas	6	0	**13.5**	.593	–	**.615**	**6.2**	.2	**2.0**	.0	**6.7**
Career		42	0	8.9	.546	–	.571	3.2	.4	.6	.2	4.2

== See also ==
- 2009 NCAA Men's Basketball All-Americans
