= NBA outdoor games =

North American basketball events

Only four National Basketball Association (NBA) games have ever been played outdoors. The first outdoor game was played between the Phoenix Suns and the Milwaukee Bucks on September 24, 1972, at Hiram Bithorn Stadium, a baseball park in San Juan, Puerto Rico, during that year's preseason. The Suns defeated the Bucks, 116–103.

The NBA did not schedule another outdoor game after that, citing weather as a major obstacle. However, in 2008, the Phoenix Suns planned to play a preseason game outdoors at the Indian Wells Tennis Garden in Indian Wells, California. The idea reportedly came from Suns part-owner Dick Heckmann, who presented it to Suns president and CEO Rick Welts. The game was played at the tennis arena on October 11, 2008, between the Suns and the Denver Nuggets. Both teams, affected by low temperature (around 64 °F or 18 °C) and high wind (at 15 miles per hour or 24 kilometres per hour), struggled from the field as they shot below 40 percent and hit only 3 out of 27 from the three-point line. Key players, including Carmelo Anthony, Allen Iverson, and Amar'e Stoudemire, missed the game due to injury. In the end, the Nuggets defeated the Suns, 77–72.

Due to the success of the 2008 game, the Suns decided to schedule more outdoor games in upcoming preseasons. On October 10, 2009, the Suns met the Golden State Warriors at Indian Wells. Due to poor weather, both teams struggled to find the basket as they shot just above 40 percent. Warriors' Anthony Morrow had the game high 30 points, while Channing Frye led the Suns with 16 points. The Warriors won the game 104–101.

A third game at Indian Wells was played on October 9, 2010, between the Suns and the Dallas Mavericks. Unlike the previous games, the weather was warm and windless. The Suns won for the first time, defeating the Mavericks 98–90. Five Suns players scored in double figures; Grant Hill led with 16. J. J. Barea had 13 to lead the Mavericks.

All modern outdoor games were televised on TNT. The WNBA has had one regular season game played outside, the Liberty Outdoor Classic, held at Arthur Ashe Stadium in Flushing, New York on July 19, 2008.

== Results ==
=== NBA ===
Season	Date	Away team	Result	Home team	Venue	Location	Notes
1972–73	September 24, 1972	Milwaukee Bucks	103–116	Phoenix Suns	Hiram Bithorn Stadium	San Juan, Puerto Rico	Preseason game.
2008–09	October 11, 2008	Denver Nuggets	77–72	Phoenix Suns	Indian Wells Tennis Garden	Indian Wells, California	Preseason game.
2009–10	October 10, 2009	Golden State Warriors	104–101	Phoenix Suns	Indian Wells Tennis Garden	Indian Wells, California	Preseason game.
2010–11	October 9, 2010	Dallas Mavericks	90–98	Phoenix Suns	Indian Wells Tennis Garden	Indian Wells, California	Preseason game.

=== WNBA ===
Season	Date	Away team	Result	Home team	Venue	Location	Notes
2008	July 19, 2008	Indiana Fever	71–55	New York Liberty	Arthur Ashe Stadium	Flushing, New York	

== See also ==
- NBA records
- NHL outdoor games
