= Liberty Outdoor Classic =

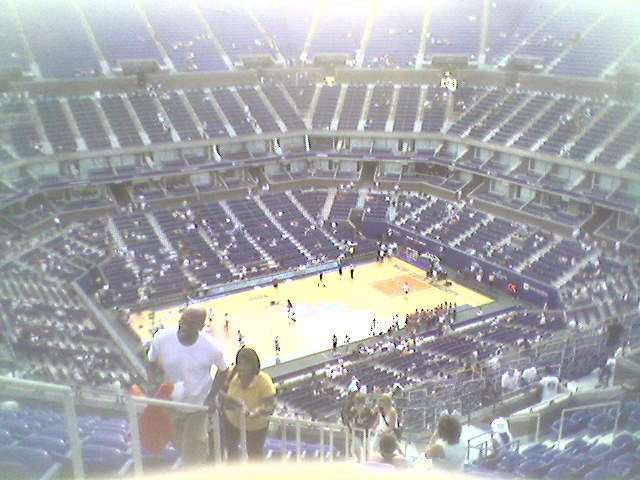
Indiana	New York
71	55
	1	2	3	4	Total
Indiana	18	15	17	21	71
New York	8	21	7	19	55
- Date: July 19, 2008
- Venue: Arthur Ashe Stadium, Flushing, New York
- Attendance: 19,393

The Liberty Outdoor Classic was the first regular-season professional basketball game played outdoors. It was played between the Indiana Fever and New York Liberty of the Women's National Basketball Association on July 19, 2008, as part of the 2008 Women's National Basketball Association regular-season schedule and the New York Liberty's home schedule. The game was held at Arthur Ashe Stadium, part of the USTA Billie Jean King National Tennis Center located within Flushing Meadows-Corona Park in Flushing, New York, and was the first non-tennis sporting event held in that venue. A portion of the proceeds from the game went to support the Breast Cancer Research Foundation. It is the first (and so far only) first outdoors regular-season pro basketball game.

The Indiana Fever won the game 71–55. Janel McCarville led the scoring for the Liberty with 10 points, while Katie Douglas led the Fever with 20.

== See also ==
- 2008 WNBA season
- NBA outdoor games
