= 2010 NBA Summer League =

The 2010 National Basketball Association Summer League (NBA Summer League) was a pro basketball league ran by the NBA in the United States just following the 2010 NBA draft. Teams consisted of players who have been in the league for three years or fewer as well as newly drafted talent. It gives rookies a chance to practice against other players that are new to the NBA. All 30 NBA teams participated besides an NBA D-League Select team so the total number of teams is 31 with each team playing 5 games except Sacramento Kings which played 6 games. It was held in Las Vegas, Nevada and Orlando, Florida from July 5 through July 18. 2010.

== Standings ==
=== Las Vegas games ===
Team	Wins	Losses	PCT
San Antonio Spurs	5	0	1.000
Toronto Raptors	5	0	1.000
Denver Nuggets	4	1	.800
Miami Heat	4	1	.800
Portland Trail Blazers	4	1	.800
Washington Wizards	4	1	.800
Sacramento Kings	4	2	.667
Atlanta Hawks	3	2	.600
Cleveland Cavaliers	3	2	.600
Golden State Warriors	3	2	.600
Houston Rockets	3	2	.600
Memphis Grizzlies	3	2	.600
New York Knicks	3	2	.600
Dallas Mavericks	2	3	.400
Detroit Pistons	2	3	.400
Chicago Bulls	1	4	.200
D-League Select	1	4	.200
Los Angeles Clippers	1	4	.200
Milwaukee Bucks	1	4	.200
Minnesota Timberwolves	1	4	.200
Phoenix Suns	1	4	.200
Los Angeles Lakers	0	5	.000
New Orleans Hornets	0	5	.000

=== Orlando games ===
Team	Wins	Losses	PCT
Oklahoma City Thunder	4	1	.800
Charlotte Bobcats	3	2	.600
Indiana Pacers	3	2	.600
New Jersey Nets	3	2	.600
Utah Jazz	3	2	.600
Philadelphia 76ers	2	3	.400
Boston Celtics	1	4	.200
Orlando Magic	1	4	.200

== Leaders ==
=== Points ===
Player	Team	PPG
John Wall	Washington Wizards	23.5
Reggie Williams	Golden State Warriors	22.6
DeMar DeRozan	Toronto Raptors	21.0
JaVale McGee	Washington Wizards	19.5
Sam Young	Memphis Grizzlies	19.4

=== Rebounds ===
Player	Team	RPG
DeMarcus Cousins	Sacramento Kings	9.8
Joey Dorsey	Toronto Raptors	9.8
Jeff Pendergraph	Portland Trail Blazers	9.5
JaVale McGee	Washington Wizards	9.3
Trent Plaisted	Chicago Bulls	9.0

=== Assists ===
Player	Team	APG
John Wall	Washington Wizards	7.8
Darren Collison	New Orleans Hornets	7.0
Dominic James	Milwaukee Bucks	6.0
Eugene Jeter	Cleveland Cavaliers	5.4
Toney Douglas	New York Knicks	5.2

== Rookie leaders ==
Legend
GP	Games played	GS	Games started	MPG	Minutes per game
FG%	Field goal percentage	3P%	3-point field goal percentage	FT%	Free throw percentage
RPG	Rebounds per game	APG	Assists per game	SPG	Steals per game
BPG	Blocks per game	PPG	Points per game	**Bold**	Career high

Rank	Player	Team	GP	GS	MPG	FG%	3P%	FT%	RPG	APG	SPG	BPG	PPG
1	John Wall	Washington Wizards	4	4	32.3	.377	.125	.872	4.0	7.8	2.5	.5	23.5
2	DeMarcus Cousins	Sacramento Kings	6	6	29.7	.333	.000	.735	9.8	1.8	1.5	1.2	14.5
3	Derrick Caracter	Los Angeles Lakers	5	5	33.4	.593	.000	.650	8.6	1.8	.4	1.4	15.4
4	Dominique Jones	Dallas Mavericks	5	5	32.2	.424	.000	.750	3.8	3.4	.8	.6	16.6
5	Greg Monroe	Detroit Pistons	5	5	30.6	.521	.000	.605	8.0	1.2	1.8	.4	14.6
6	Larry Sanders	Milwaukee Bucks	5	5	33.6	.446	.333	.588	8.4	.8	1.4	3.2	14.0
7	Landry Fields	New York Knicks	5	1	26.0	.527	.231	.739	4.8	1.2	1.6	.6	15.6
8	Gani Lawal	Phoenix Suns	5	5	27.6	.492	.000	.463	7.4	.2	.6	1.0	15.4
9	Ed Davis	Toronto Raptors	5	5	25.2	.632	.000	.625	6.0	1.0	.2	1.8	12.6
10	Quincy Pondexter	New Orleans Hornets	5	5	32.4	.407	.333	.784	4.0	2.0	1.4	.2	15.2

== Awards ==
- Summer League MVP: John Wall
