= 2010–11 NBA season =

65th NBA season

- League: National Basketball Association
- Sport: Basketball
- Duration: October 26, 2010 – April 13, 2011; April 16 – May 26, 2011 (Playoffs); May 31 – June 12, 2011 (Finals)
- Games: 82
- Teams: 30
- TV partner(s): ABC, TNT, ESPN, NBA TV

Draft
- Top draft pick: John Wall
- Picked by: Washington Wizards

Regular season
- Top seed: Chicago Bulls
- Season MVP: Derrick Rose (Chicago)
- Top scorer: Kevin Durant (Oklahoma City)

Playoffs
- Eastern champions: Miami Heat
- Eastern runners-up: Chicago Bulls
- Western champions: Dallas Mavericks
- Western runners-up: Oklahoma City Thunder

Finals
- Champions: Dallas Mavericks
- Runners-up: Miami Heat
- Finals MVP: Dirk Nowitzki (Dallas)

NBA seasons
- ← 2009–10 2011–12 →

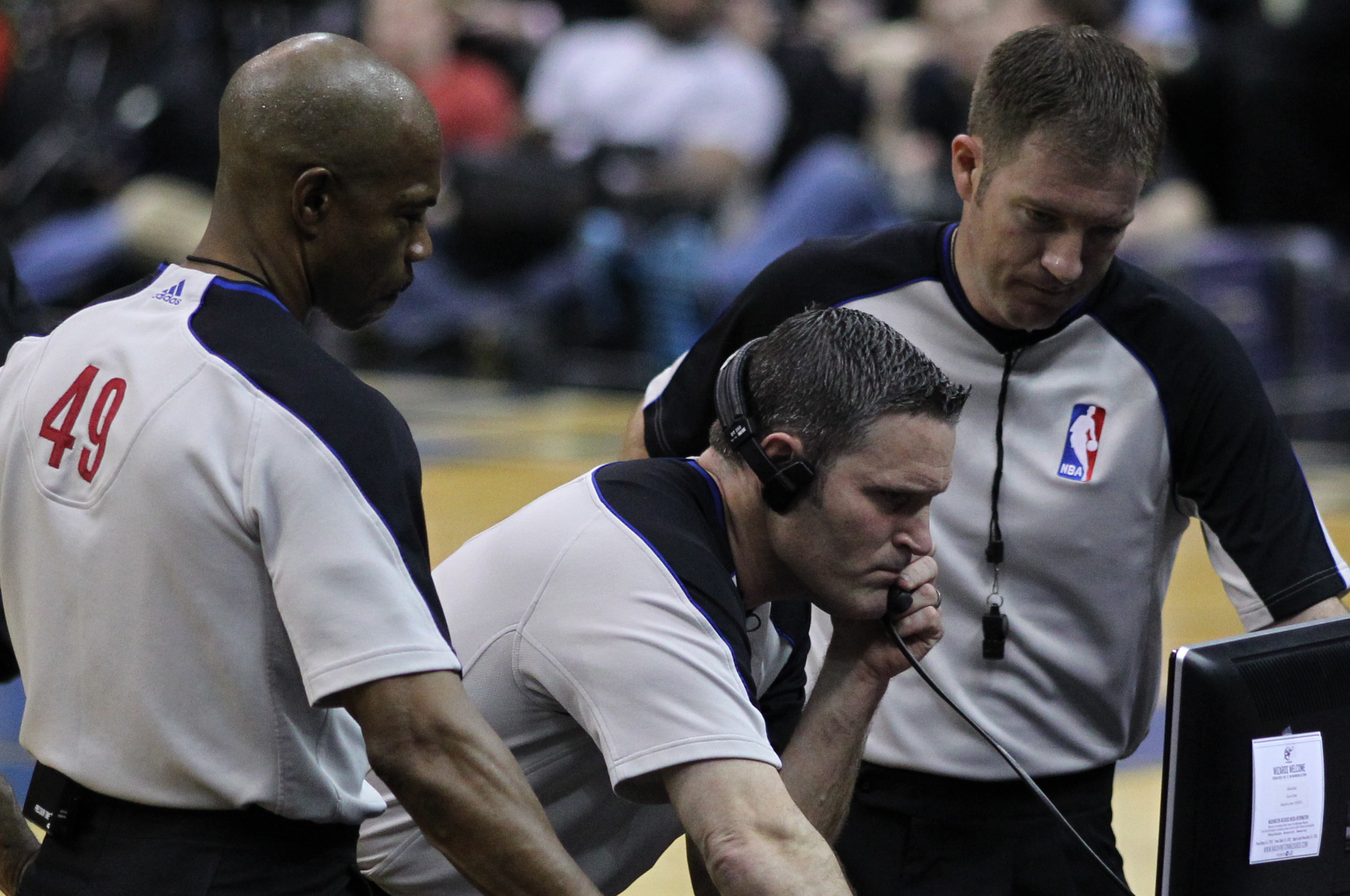

The 2010–11 NBA season was the 65th season of the National Basketball Association (NBA). The 2011 NBA All-Star Game was played on February 20, 2011, at Staples Center in Los Angeles. Chicago's Derrick Rose was named the 2010–11 NBA MVP. The Dallas Mavericks won their first championship by defeating the Miami Heat 4 games to 2.

== Transactions ==
=== Coaching changes ===
Coaching changes
Off-season
Team	2009–10 coach	2010–11 coach
Philadelphia 76ers	Eddie Jordan	Doug Collins
New Orleans Hornets	Jeff Bower	Monty Williams
New Jersey Nets	Kiki Vandeweghe	Avery Johnson
Atlanta Hawks	Mike Woodson	Larry Drew
Chicago Bulls	Vinny Del Negro	Tom Thibodeau
Cleveland Cavaliers	Mike Brown	Byron Scott
Los Angeles Clippers	Kim Hughes	Vinny Del Negro
Golden State Warriors	Don Nelson	Keith Smart
In-season
Team	Outgoing coach	Incoming coach
Charlotte Bobcats	Larry Brown	Paul Silas
Indiana Pacers	Jim O'Brien	Frank Vogel
Utah Jazz	Jerry Sloan	Tyrone Corbin

==== Off-season ====
- On May 21, the Philadelphia 76ers hired Doug Collins as head coach, replacing Eddie Jordan who was fired on April 15.
- On June 7, the New Orleans Hornets hired Portland Trail Blazers assistant coach Monty Williams as head coach, replacing interim head coach Jeff Bower who returned to his original position as general manager.
- On June 10, the New Jersey Nets hired Avery Johnson as head coach, replacing interim head coach Kiki Vandeweghe whose contract expired at the end of the 2009–2010 season.
- On June 13, the Atlanta Hawks promoted assistant coach Larry Drew, replacing head coach Mike Woodson whose contract expired at the end of the 2009–10 season.
- On June 23, the Chicago Bulls hired Boston Celtics assistant coach Tom Thibodeau as head coach, replacing Vinny Del Negro who was fired on May 4.
- On July 1, the Cleveland Cavaliers hired Byron Scott as head coach, replacing Mike Brown who was fired on May 24.
- On July 7, the Los Angeles Clippers hired Vinny Del Negro as head coach, replacing interim head coach Kim Hughes who was fired on April 15.
- On September 27, the Golden State Warriors promoted assistant coach Keith Smart to head coach, replacing Don Nelson who resigned after his contract was bought out.

==== In-season ====
- On December 22, 2010, Larry Brown stepped down as the Charlotte Bobcats head coach. Paul Silas took over on an interim basis. On February 16, 2011, Silas was named as full-time Bobcats head coach.
- On January 30, 2011, Jim O'Brien was fired as the Indiana Pacers head coach. Assistant coach Frank Vogel took over on an interim basis.
- On February 10, 2011, Utah Jazz coach Jerry Sloan and long-time assistant Phil Johnson resigned. Assistant Tyrone Corbin took over as head coach.

=== Free agency ===
The 2010 off-season had one of the most talented free agent pools in recent NBA history. The list of free agents included All-Stars LeBron James, Chris Bosh, Dwyane Wade, Dirk Nowitzki, Carlos Boozer and Amar'e Stoudemire, as well as other veteran players such as Ray Allen, Joe Johnson, Allen Iverson, Tracy McGrady, Shaquille O'Neal and Paul Pierce. Below are the major free agency signings, including the sign and trade agreements, that occurred during the off-season.

- Joe Johnson re-signed with the Atlanta Hawks.
- Paul Pierce and Ray Allen re-signed with the Boston Celtics, while Jermaine O'Neal and Shaquille O'Neal signed with the Celtics.
- Carlos Boozer signed and traded to the Chicago Bulls.
- David Lee signed and traded to the Golden State Warriors.
- Dirk Nowitzki re-signed with the Dallas Mavericks.
- Ben Wallace re-signed with the Detroit Pistons, while Tracy McGrady signed with the Pistons.
- Luis Scola re-signed with the Houston Rockets.
- Rudy Gay re-signed with the Memphis Grizzlies.
- Dwyane Wade re-signed with the Miami Heat, while Chris Bosh and LeBron James signed and traded to the Heat. James announced his decision on an ESPN special called The Decision. Many Cleveland fans considered his departure a betrayal.
- Amar'e Stoudemire signed and traded to the New York Knicks.

== 2010–11 NBA changes ==
- Cleveland Cavaliers – added new logo and new uniforms, replacing wine and darker gold with dark navy blue with remained wine and dark navy blue added lighter gold to their color scheme, removed the side panels to their jerseys and shorts and changed their wordmark to their jerseys.
- Golden State Warriors – added new logo and new uniforms, brought back original gold and blue colors replacing dark navy blue, orange and gold, added side panels to their jerseys and shorts.
- Los Angeles Clippers – added new logo and new uniforms, remained with red, white and blue to their color scheme and removed the side panels to their jerseys and shorts.
- Minnesota Timberwolves – added new black road alternate uniforms with grey side panels to their jerseys and shorts.
- New Jersey Nets – moved into their new arena the Prudential Center in Newark, New Jersey.
- Orlando Magic – added new logo, changed their wordmark on their primary logo, added new black road alternate uniforms with pinstripes and blue side panels to their jerseys and shorts and moved into their new arena the Amway Center.
- Philadelphia 76ers – added new blue road alternate uniforms with red side panels to their jerseys and shorts. Also, Wachovia Center, their home arena, was renamed the Wells Fargo Center due to Wachovia's acquisition by Wells Fargo.
- Utah Jazz – added new logo and uniforms, replacing dark navy blue, light blue, and purple with remained dark navy blue, added green, gold and yellow to their color scheme and added side panels to their jerseys and shorts.

== Preseason ==
NBA Europe Live 2010 was played October 3, 2010 – October 7, 2010, featuring the New York Knicks, Minnesota Timberwolves, Los Angeles Lakers and teams from Europe (Armani Jeans Milano and Regal FC Barcelona) The Dallas Mavericks and the Phoenix Suns played in Indian Wells, California, on October 9 for their outdoor special. The Houston Rockets and New Jersey Nets played in the fifth annual NBA China Games on October 13 in Beijing, and October 16 at Guangzhou. The preseason schedule was released in August.

== Regular season ==
The regular season began on October 26, 2010, and ended on April 13, 2011. The Opening Day schedule on TNT had the Miami Heat face the Boston Celtics, followed by the Los Angeles Lakers' championship ring and banner ceremony and their game against the Houston Rockets. The opener began at 7:30 p.m. ET. On Christmas Day, ABC and ESPN had a five-game set, with ABC broadcasting the game between the Celtics and the Orlando Magic, and the Heat against the Lakers, which started at 2:00 p.m. ET. On Martin Luther King Day, ESPN aired the game between the Chicago Bulls and the Memphis Grizzlies at 1:00 p.m. ET, while NBA TV aired the Sacramento Kings–Atlanta Hawks matchup at 4:00 p.m. ET. TNT capped off the holiday with a doubleheader, beginning with the Magic facing the Celtics, followed by the Oklahoma City Thunder facing the Los Angeles Lakers, beginning at 8:00 p.m. ET. The full schedule was released on August 10, 2010.

Other much-anticipated games include: on October 28, 2010, John Wall, the No. 1 pick in the 2010 NBA draft, made his NBA debut as the Washington Wizards visited the Magic on TNT. On December 2, LeBron James returned to Cleveland for the first time since the Decision as his Heat faced the Cavaliers on TNT. The Celtics–Lakers rivalry renewed on January 30, 2011 (at Los Angeles on ABC) and on February 10, 2011 (at Boston on TNT) in a rematch of the 2010 NBA Finals. On March 4–5, 2011, the New Jersey Nets and Toronto Raptors faced off in two regular season games held at London's O2 Arena.

=== Standings ===
==== By division ====
Eastern Conference

Atlantic Division	W	L	PCT	GB	Home	Road	Div
y-Boston Celtics	56	26	.683	–	33–8	23–18	13–3
x-New York Knicks	42	40	.512	14	23–18	19–22	10–6
x-Philadelphia 76ers	41	41	.500	15	26–15	15–26	9–7
New Jersey Nets	24	58	.293	32	19–22	5–36	3–13
Toronto Raptors	22	60	.268	34	16–25	6–35	5–11

Central Division	W	L	PCT	GB	Home	Road	Div
z-Chicago Bulls	62	20	.756	–	36–5	26–15	15–1
x-Indiana Pacers	37	45	.451	25	24–17	13–28	9–7
Milwaukee Bucks	35	47	.427	27	22–19	13–28	6–10
Detroit Pistons	30	52	.366	32	21–20	9–32	7–9
Cleveland Cavaliers	19	63	.232	43	12–29	7–34	3–13

Southeast Division	W	L	PCT	GB	Home	Road	Div
y-Miami Heat	58	24	.707	–	30–11	28–13	13–3
x-Orlando Magic	52	30	.634	6	29–12	23–18	11–5
x-Atlanta Hawks	44	38	.537	14	24–17	20–21	9–7
Charlotte Bobcats	34	48	.415	24	21–20	13–28	4–12
Washington Wizards	23	59	.280	35	20–21	3–38	3–13

Western Conference

Northwest Division	W	L	PCT	GB	Home	Road	Div
y-Oklahoma City Thunder	55	27	.671	–	30–11	25–16	13–3
x-Denver Nuggets	50	32	.610	5	33–8	17–24	9–7
x-Portland Trail Blazers	48	34	.585	7	30–11	18–23	10–6
Utah Jazz	39	43	.476	16	21–20	18–23	7–9
Minnesota Timberwolves	17	65	.207	38	12–29	5–36	1–15

Pacific Division	W	L	PCT	GB	Home	Road	Div
y-Los Angeles Lakers	57	25	.695	–	30–11	27–14	12–4
Phoenix Suns	40	42	.488	17	23–18	17–24	9–7
Golden State Warriors	36	46	.439	21	26–15	10–31	5–11
Los Angeles Clippers	32	50	.390	25	23–18	9–32	7–9
Sacramento Kings	24	58	.293	33	11–30	13–28	7–9

Southwest Division	W	L	PCT	GB	Home	Road	Div
c-San Antonio Spurs	61	21	.744	–	36–5	25–16	10–6
x-Dallas Mavericks	57	25	.695	4	29–12	28–13	8–8
x-New Orleans Hornets	46	36	.561	15	28–13	18–23	9–7
x-Memphis Grizzlies	46	36	.561	15	30–11	16–25	8–8
Houston Rockets	43	39	.524	18	25–16	18–23	5–11

==== By conference ====
#	Eastern Conference				
#	Team	W	L	PCT	GB
1	z-Chicago Bulls	62	20	.756	–
2	y-Miami Heat	58	24	.707	4
3	y-Boston Celtics	56	26	.683	6
4	x-Orlando Magic	52	30	.634	10
5	x-Atlanta Hawks	44	38	.537	18
6	x-New York Knicks	42	40	.512	20
7	x-Philadelphia 76ers	41	41	.500	21
8	x-Indiana Pacers	37	45	.451	25
9	Milwaukee Bucks	35	47	.427	27
10	Charlotte Bobcats	34	48	.415	28
11	Detroit Pistons	30	52	.366	32
12	New Jersey Nets	24	58	.293	38
13	Washington Wizards	23	59	.280	39
14	Toronto Raptors	22	60	.268	40
15	Cleveland Cavaliers	19	63	.232	43

#	Western Conference				
#	Team	W	L	PCT	GB
1	c-San Antonio Spurs	61	21	.744	–
2	y-Los Angeles Lakers	57	25	.695	4
3	x-Dallas Mavericks	57	25	.695	4
4	y-Oklahoma City Thunder	55	27	.671	6
5	x-Denver Nuggets	50	32	.610	11
6	x-Portland Trail Blazers	48	34	.585	13
7	x-New Orleans Hornets	46	36	.561	15
8	x-Memphis Grizzlies	46	36	.561	15
9	Houston Rockets	43	39	.524	18
10	Phoenix Suns	40	42	.488	21
11	Utah Jazz	39	43	.476	22
12	Golden State Warriors	36	46	.439	25
13	Los Angeles Clippers	32	50	.390	29
14	Sacramento Kings	24	58	.293	37
15	Minnesota Timberwolves	17	65	.207	44

Notes

- z – Clinched home court advantage for the entire playoffs
- c – Clinched home court advantage for the conference playoffs
- y – Clinched division title
- x – Clinched playoff spot

==== Tiebreakers ====
===== Western Conference =====
- Los Angeles Lakers clinched #2 seed over Dallas Mavericks upon winning the Pacific Division.
- New Orleans Hornets clinched #7 seed over Memphis Grizzlies based on winning percentage in the Southwest Division (the Hornets' 0.563 to the Grizzlies' 0.500).

== Playoffs ==
The 2011 NBA Playoffs began on April 16, with the Conference Finals concluding on May 26. The NBA Finals began on May 31 due to both Conference Finals ending in five games. ESPN began their playoff broadcast on April 16, and continued every Friday and Saturday thereafter, with the Sunday–Thursday schedule reserved for TNT (some Saturday first-round games apply) and NBA TV. ABC continued broadcasting early-round playoff coverage every Sunday afternoon, with select Saturday afternoon broadcasts. The first round playoff coverage was non-exclusive except for ABC-covered games, in which local sports networks (e.g. Fox Sports Net, Comcast SportsNet) still aired the game in their home market. TNT aired the Eastern Conference Finals while ESPN aired the Western Conference Finals. The NBA Finals were shown on ABC. Nationwide radio coverage was on ESPN Radio for select playoff games, the entire Conference Finals and NBA Finals.

=== Bracket ===
First Round	Conference semifinals
E1	Chicago*	4
E8	Indiana	1
E1	Chicago*	4
E5	Atlanta	2
E4	Orlando	2
E5	Atlanta	4
Eastern Conference
E3	Boston*	4
E6	New York	0
E3	Boston*	1
E2	Miami*	4
E2	Miami*	4
E7	Philadelphia	1
W1	San Antonio*	2
W8	Memphis	4
W8	Memphis	3
W4	Oklahoma City*	4
W4	Oklahoma City*	4
W5	Denver	1
Western Conference
W3	Dallas	4
W6	Portland	2
W3	Dallas	4
W2	LA Lakers*	0
W2	LA Lakers*	4
W7	New Orleans	2

Conference finals
E1	Chicago*	1
E2	Miami*	4
W4	Oklahoma City*	1
W3	Dallas	4

NBA Finals
E2	Miami*	2
W3	Dallas	4

- * Division winner
- Bold Series winner
- Italic Team with home-court advantage

== Notable occurrences ==
- Adidas introduced the Revolution 30 technology, to be used on all NBA team uniforms. The uniforms are 30% lighter than before and also enable moisture management.
- The New Jersey Nets played their first home regular season game at Prudential Center in Newark, New Jersey, on October 27, defeating the Detroit Pistons 104–101. Prudential Center served as the interim home for the team while the Barclays Center was being constructed in Brooklyn, New York.
- The Orlando Magic played its first regular season game at Amway Center on October 28, defeating the Washington Wizards 112–83. Wizards guard John Wall made his NBA debut.
- Golden State Warriors guard Jeremy Lin became the first Taiwanese-American to play in the NBA when he debuted in the Warriors' 109–91 victory over the Los Angeles Clippers on October 29.
- The fines accounted for technical fouls were doubled in an effort to reduce excessive complaining.
- A record 84 international players made the opening day rosters for 30 NBA teams, including rookies Greivis Vásquez of Venezuela and Kevin Seraphin of France. This includes players born in insular areas of the United States, such as Puerto Rico and the U.S. Virgin Islands (with the most notable example being Tim Duncan, a USVI native), but does not include U.S.-born players who represent other national teams (such as Kosta Koufos, born and raised in Ohio but representing his parents' homeland of Greece).
- Former Portland Trail Blazers forward Maurice Lucas died on October 31 of bladder cancer.
- The New Orleans Hornets were sold by owner George Shinn to the NBA, becoming the first team to be owned by the league.
- Yao Ming suffers another season-ending stress fracture injury. He only appeared in 5 games this season.
- The Cleveland Cavaliers lost All-Star forward LeBron James to the Miami Heat via free agency. After having the league's best record for two straight seasons, they lost an NBA record 26 straight games, furthering their turnaround from one of the league's best to one of the league's worst.
- Utah Jazz head coach Jerry Sloan resigned, ending a 23-year coaching tenure, the longest in any of the four American major professional sports leagues. Two weeks later, the Jazz traded Deron Williams to the New Jersey Nets for Devin Harris, Derrick Favors and 2 first-round picks.
- Boston Celtics guard Ray Allen broke the record for most career 3-point field goals previously held by Reggie Miller the record remained for ten years until Stephen Curry broke his record during the 2021–22 season.
- 2011 NBA All-Star Game: Kobe Bryant joins Bob Pettit as the only four-time NBA All-Star Game MVP awardees; Blake Griffin became the first rookie since Yao Ming to play in the All-Star Game. LeBron James became only the second player to have an All-Star Game triple-double. Amar'e Stoudemire became the first Knick to start in an All-Star Game since Patrick Ewing in the 1992 NBA All-Star Game.
- The New York Knicks agreed to a blockbuster 13-player deal with the Denver Nuggets and the Minnesota Timberwolves which brought Carmelo Anthony to New York on February 22. The Knicks sent Wilson Chandler, Danilo Gallinari, Raymond Felton, Timofey Mozgov, 1 first-round pick and 2 second-round picks to the Nuggets in exchange for Anthony, Chauncey Billups, Shelden Williams, Renaldo Balkman and Anthony Carter. The Timberwolves sent Kosta Koufos to Denver, Corey Brewer to New York, and received Eddy Curry and Anthony Randolph from New York and a second-round pick from Denver.
- In their February 25 loss against the Philadelphia 76ers, the Detroit Pistons played only six players. Tracy McGrady, Chris Wilcox, Tayshaun Prince, Ben Wallace, Rodney Stuckey, Austin Daye, Jonas Jerebko, and Terrico White did not play in the game. Jerebko and White were injured, while the others sat out in protest of head coach John Kuester. Kuester called the situation "an internal matter."
- On April 1, the Detroit Pistons retired the #10 jersey number in honor of Dennis Rodman in a ceremony held during halftime of a game against the Chicago Bulls at the Palace of Auburn Hills.
- 2010–11 marked Shaquille O'Neal's last pro season, as the 15-time All-Star, who played with the Boston Celtics this season, announced his retirement on June 1, 2011, one day after one of his former coaches, Mike Brown, was introduced by one of his former teams, the Los Angeles Lakers.
- The Chicago Bulls earned the top overall seed for the first time since the 1996–97 season. The Bulls lost to the Miami Heat 4–1 in the conference finals.
- The Dallas Mavericks won their first NBA championship by defeating the Miami Heat 4–2 in the NBA Finals.
- Phil Jackson announced his retirement as head coach after the defending champion Los Angeles Lakers were swept 4–0 by the eventual champion Mavericks in the conference semifinals. This marked the first time that Jackson had been on the wrong side of a playoff sweep.
- The Memphis Grizzlies won the franchise's first playoff game and series in a 4–2 victory over the top-seeded San Antonio Spurs in the first round. They became the fourth team (and second in the seven-game first round era) to topple the top seed in the first round of the playoffs.
- Kia replaced Toyota as the official automotive partner of the NBA.

== Milestones/records set ==
=== Individual ===
- October 29: 1,100 coaching wins. Los Angeles Lakers head coach Phil Jackson won his 1,100th game in the Lakers' 114–106 victory over the Phoenix Suns.
- November 3: 36th player in history to 20,000 points. Boston Celtics forward Paul Pierce scored his 20,000th career point in a 105–102 overtime win over the Milwaukee Bucks. Pierce became the third Celtic to reach the mark after Larry Bird and John Havlicek.
- November 11: Youngest player to 26,000 points. Los Angeles Lakers guard Kobe Bryant became the youngest player to score 26,000 points in a 118–112 loss to the Denver Nuggets. Bryant achieved the mark at the age of 32 years and 80 days, surpassing Wilt Chamberlain by 34 days.
- November 12: Minnesota Timberwolves franchise record; most rebounds in a game. Minnesota Timberwolves forward Kevin Love scored 31 points and grabbed a franchise record 31 rebounds in the Wolves' 112–103 win over the New York Knicks. The last player to have a 30–30 game was Moses Malone on February 11, 1982.
- November 12: Second player in history to 11,000 assists. Dallas Mavericks guard Jason Kidd reached the 11,000th assist mark in the Mavericks' 99–90 win over the Philadelphia 76ers. Kidd became only the second player to achieve the mark after John Stockton.
- November 19: San Antonio Spurs franchise records; career points and games played. San Antonio Spurs forward Tim Duncan became the Spurs' all-time leading scorer and all-time leader in games played, passing his former "Twin Towers" teammate David Robinson in the Spurs' 94–82 win over the Utah Jazz. Duncan played in his 988th game, surpassing Robinson's 987 career games, while also surpassing Robinson's career total of 20,790 points.
- November 20: Charlotte Bobcats franchise record; first triple-double. Charlotte Bobcats's Stephen Jackson recorded the franchise's first triple-double in a 123–105 victory over the Phoenix Suns. It was also Jackson's second career triple-double.
- November 27: Golden State Warriors franchise record; most three-pointers in a game. In a 104–94 road victory against the Minnesota Timberwolves, Golden State Warriors guard Dorell Wright set a franchise record with nine three-point field goals made, surpassing Jason Richardson's record of eight three-pointers set on March 29, 2007.
- November 30: 34th player in history to 10,000 rebounds. In a 79–90 loss at the Orlando Magic, Detroit Pistons center Ben Wallace became the 34th player in NBA history to surpass the 10,000 rebound mark for his career.
- December 10: Seventh coach in history to 1,000 wins. Denver Nuggets head coach George Karl became the seventh head coach in NBA history to win 1,000 games in the Nuggets' 123–116 road victory over the Toronto Raptors.
- December 12: 94th player in history to 1,000 games. San Antonio Spurs forward Tim Duncan played in the 1,000th regular season game of his career, becoming the 94th player in NBA history to play in one thousand games.
- December 12: New York Knicks franchise record; consecutive 30 point games. In a 129–125 home victory against the Denver Nuggets, New York Knicks forward Amar'e Stoudemire set a franchise record with eight consecutive 30 point games, surpassing Willie Naulls's record of seven set from February 22 to March 4, 1962. He would end up with nine straight 30-point games.
- December 22: 95th player in history to 1,000 games. Detroit Pistons center Ben Wallace played in the 1,000th regular season game of his career, becoming the 95th player in NBA history to play in one thousand games.
- December 22: 3rd coach in history to win 1,211 games. Utah Jazz head coach Jerry Sloan has won his 1,211 games in his career of coaching after defeating the Minnesota Timberwolves, with the victory Jerry surpasses Pat Riley for the third all-time in career wins.
- December 25: 4th Christmas Day triple double. In a 96–80 win over the Los Angeles Lakers, Miami Heat forward LeBron James became the 4th player in NBA history to achieve a triple double on Christmas Day and the 1st in 40 years, other players are Billy Cunningham, John Havlicek, and Oscar Robertson.
- December 29: Los Angeles Clippers franchise record; consecutive double-double games. In a 95–103 home loss against the Utah Jazz, Los Angeles Clippers forward Blake Griffin set a franchise record with 20 consecutive double-double games, surpassing Michael Cage's record of 19 set from December 10, 1986, to January 16, 1987. He would end up with 27 straight double-double games.
- January 16: 37th player in history to 20,000 points. Phoenix Suns guard Vince Carter scored his 20,000th career points in a win over the New York Knicks. Carter finished the game with 29 points on 11-for-20 shooting and grabbed 12 rebounds.
- February 8: Minnesota Timberwolves franchise record; consecutive double-double games. In a 112–108 home win against the Houston Rockets, Minnesota Timberwolves forward Kevin Love set a franchise record with 38 consecutive double-double games, surpassing Kevin Garnett's record of 37.
- February 10: Most three-pointers made in a career. In a 92–86 loss to the Los Angeles Lakers, Boston Celtics guard Ray Allen surpassed Reggie Miller as the all-time leader in three-point shots made with 2,562. Allen did this in three fewer seasons and with 300 fewer games.
- February 15: 96th player in history to 1,000 games. Chicago Bulls center Kurt Thomas played in the 1,000th regular season game of his career, becoming the 96th player in NBA history to play in one thousand games.
- March 9: NBA record; consecutive double-double games. Minnesota Timberwolves power forward Kevin Love set the NBA record for most consecutive games with a double-double since the NBA-ABA merger, besting Moses Malone's record of 51. He recorded his 52nd consecutive double-double in a 101–75 win over the Indiana Pacers.
- April 6: Golden State Warriors franchise record; most three-pointers in a season Golden State Warriors guard Dorell Wright made a Warriors franchise record of 3 pt shots made in a season with 184 in a home win versus the Los Angeles Lakers, beating Jason Richardson with the previous record of 183 in the 2005–06 season.
- May 17: NBA record; Most free throws made in a game Dirk Nowitzki made 24 free throws without misses.

=== Team ===
- November 3: Boston Celtics became the first team in NBA history to have four active players with at least 20,000 career points after Paul Pierce scored his 20,000th point in a win over Milwaukee Bucks, other players are Shaquille O'Neal, Kevin Garnett and Ray Allen.
- November 3: Orlando Magic franchise record: most points in first half. In a 128–86 victory against the Minnesota Timberwolves, the Orlando Magic set a franchise record for most points in the first half with 78. On the other hand, the Timberwolves suffered their worst loss in franchise history.
- November 9: Indiana Pacers franchise record: most points in a quarter. The Indiana Pacers scored 54 points in the third quarter against the Denver Nuggets, the most points scored by a team in a quarter since the Phoenix Suns scored 57 in the second quarter against the Denver Nuggets on November 10, 1990. The team was also one field goal short of recording a perfect third quarter (the Pacers shot 20–21).
- November 14: Phoenix Suns franchise record: most three-pointers in a game. In a 121–116 victory over the Los Angeles Lakers, the Phoenix Suns set a franchise record with 22 made three-point field goals in a game, one shy of the NBA record 23 in a game by the Orlando Magic on January 13, 2009.
- December 12: New Orleans Hornets franchise record: fewest assists in a game. In a 70–88 loss at the Philadelphia 76ers, the New Orleans Hornets set a franchise record low with four assists, one shy of the NBA record of three.
- NBA record: consecutive road wins in a calendar month, Miami Heat franchise record: most wins in a calendar month. The Miami Heat set a league record when they recorded 10 straight road wins in the month of December. The Heat also set a franchise record for most wins in a calendar month with 15.
- January 7: Second team to win 3,000 games. The Boston Celtics became only the second team after the Los Angeles Lakers to win 3,000 games in a 122–102 win over the Toronto Raptors.
- January 30: Cleveland Cavaliers single-season franchise record. The Cleveland Cavaliers lost their 20th straight game in the same season, breaking their old record of 19 straight within the same season in 1981–82. Their streak would end after 26 straight losses.
- February 5: NBA record: longest single-season losing streak. With a 111–105 loss to the Portland Trail Blazers, the Cleveland Cavaliers now hold the longest single-season losing streak with its 24th consecutive loss (streak ended at 26).
- February 7: NBA record: longest losing streak. With a 99–96 loss to the Dallas Mavericks, the Cleveland Cavaliers now hold the longest losing streak with its 25th consecutive loss (streak ended at 26).
- March 11: NBA record: Most combined three-pointers in a game; Golden State Warriors franchise record: Most three-pointers in a game. The game between the Golden State Warriors and the Orlando Magic, a 123–120 overtime win by the Warriors, saw a combined 36 three-point shots made in an NBA game. The Warriors also set a franchise record by connecting 21 three-point shots.

== Statistics leaders ==
=== Individual statistic leaders ===
Category	Player	Team	Statistics
Points per game	Kevin Durant	Oklahoma City Thunder	27.7
Rebounds per game	Kevin Love	Minnesota Timberwolves	15.2
Assists per game	Steve Nash	Phoenix Suns	11.4
Steals per game	Chris Paul	New Orleans Hornets	2.35
Blocks per game	Andrew Bogut	Milwaukee Bucks	2.58
Turnovers per game	Russell Westbrook	Oklahoma City Thunder	3.9
Fouls per game	DeMarcus Cousins	Sacramento Kings	4.1
Minutes per game	Monta Ellis	Golden State Warriors	40.3
Efficiency per game	LeBron James	Miami Heat	27.3
FG%	Nenê	Denver Nuggets	61.8%
FT%	Stephen Curry	Golden State Warriors	93.4%
3FG%	Matt Bonner	San Antonio Spurs	45.7%
Double-Doubles	Dwight Howard	Orlando Magic	66
Triple-Doubles	LeBron James	Miami Heat	4

=== Individual game highs ===
Category	Player	Team	Statistics
Points	LeBron James	Miami Heat	51
Rebounds	Kevin Love	Minnesota Timberwolves	31
Assists	Rajon Rondo	Boston Celtics	24
Steals	John Wall	Washington Wizards	9
Blocks	JaVale McGee	Washington Wizards	12
Three Pointers	Ty Lawson	Denver Nuggets	10

=== Team Statistic Leaders ===
Category	Team	Statistics
Points per game	Denver Nuggets	107.5
Rebounds per game	Minnesota Timberwolves	44.4
Assists per game	Dallas Mavericks	23.8
Assists per game	Houston Rockets	23.8
Steals per game	Memphis Grizzlies	9.4
Blocks per game	Washington Wizards	6.1
Turnovers per game	Minnesota Timberwolves	17.0
Fouls per game	Utah Jazz	22.7
FG%	Boston Celtics	48.6%
FT%	Oklahoma City Thunder	82.3%
3FG%	San Antonio Spurs	39.7%
±	Miami Heat	7.5

== Awards ==
=== Yearly awards ===
- Most Valuable Player: Derrick Rose, Chicago Bulls
- Defensive Player of the Year: Dwight Howard, Orlando Magic
- Rookie of the Year: Blake Griffin, Los Angeles Clippers
- Sixth Man of the Year: Lamar Odom, Los Angeles Lakers
- Most Improved Player: Kevin Love, Minnesota Timberwolves
- Coach of the Year: Tom Thibodeau, Chicago Bulls
- Executive of the Year: Pat Riley, Miami Heat & Gar Forman, Chicago Bulls
- Sportsmanship Award: Stephen Curry, Golden State Warriors
- J. Walter Kennedy Citizenship Award: Ron Artest, Los Angeles Lakers

- All-NBA First Team:
  - F Kevin Durant, Oklahoma City Thunder
  - F LeBron James, Miami Heat
  - C Dwight Howard, Orlando Magic
  - G Kobe Bryant, Los Angeles Lakers
  - G Derrick Rose, Chicago Bulls
- All-NBA Second Team:
  - F Pau Gasol, Los Angeles Lakers
  - F Dirk Nowitzki, Dallas Mavericks
  - C Amar'e Stoudemire, New York Knicks
  - G Dwyane Wade, Miami Heat
  - G Russell Westbrook, Oklahoma City Thunder
- All-NBA Third Team:
  - F LaMarcus Aldridge, Portland Trail Blazers
  - F Zach Randolph, Memphis Grizzlies
  - C Al Horford, Atlanta Hawks
  - G Manu Ginóbili, San Antonio Spurs
  - G Chris Paul, New Orleans Hornets

- NBA All-Defensive First Team:
  - F LeBron James, Miami Heat
  - F Kevin Garnett, Boston Celtics
  - C Dwight Howard, Orlando Magic
  - G Kobe Bryant, Los Angeles Lakers
  - G Rajon Rondo, Boston Celtics
- NBA All-Defensive Second Team:
  - F Andre Iguodala, Philadelphia 76ers
  - C Joakim Noah, Chicago Bulls
  - C Tyson Chandler, Dallas Mavericks
  - G Tony Allen, Memphis Grizzlies
  - G Chris Paul, New Orleans Hornets

- NBA All-Rookie First Team:
  - F Landry Fields, New York Knicks
  - F Blake Griffin, Los Angeles Clippers
  - C DeMarcus Cousins, Sacramento Kings
  - G Gary Neal, San Antonio Spurs
  - G John Wall, Washington Wizards
- NBA All-Rookie Second Team:
  - F Paul George, Indiana Pacers
  - F Derrick Favors, Utah Jazz
  - C Greg Monroe, Detroit Pistons
  - G Wesley Johnson, Minnesota Timberwolves
  - G Eric Bledsoe, Los Angeles Clippers

=== Players of the week ===
The following players were named the Eastern and Western Conference Players of the Week.

Week	Eastern Conference	Western Conference	Ref.
Oct 26 – 31	Rajon Rondo (Boston Celtics) (1/1)	Pau Gasol (Los Angeles Lakers) (1/1)	
Nov 1 – 7	Dwight Howard (Orlando Magic) (1/6)	Chris Paul (New Orleans Hornets) (1/1)	
Nov 8 – 14	Derrick Rose (Chicago Bulls) (1/2)	Deron Williams (Utah Jazz) (1/1)	
Nov 15 – 21	Amar'e Stoudemire (New York Knicks) (1/2)	Russell Westbrook (Oklahoma City Thunder) (1/4)	
Nov 22 – 28	Dwight Howard (Orlando Magic) (2/6)	Dirk Nowitzki (Dallas Mavericks) (1/2)	
Nov 29 – Dec 5	Amar'e Stoudemire (New York Knicks) (2/2)	Russell Westbrook (Oklahoma City Thunder) (2/4)	
Dec 6 – 12	Dwyane Wade (Miami Heat) (1/3)	Dirk Nowitzki (Dallas Mavericks) (2/2)	
Dec 13 – 19	Paul Pierce (Boston Celtics) (1/2)	Tony Parker (San Antonio Spurs) (1/2)	
Dec 20 – 26	LeBron James (Miami Heat) (1/5)	Monta Ellis (Golden State Warriors) (1/1)	
Dec 27 – Jan 2	Dwyane Wade (Miami Heat) (2/3)	Chauncey Billups (Denver Nuggets) (1/1)	
Jan 3 – 9	LeBron James (Miami Heat) (2/5)	Zach Randolph (Memphis Grizzlies) (1/3)	
Jan 10 – 16	Derrick Rose (Chicago Bulls) (2/2)	Russell Westbrook (Oklahoma City Thunder) (3/4)	
Jan 17 – 23	Dwight Howard (Orlando Magic) (3/6)	LaMarcus Aldridge (Portland Trail Blazers) (1/2)	
Jan 24 – 30	LeBron James (Miami Heat) (3/5)	Zach Randolph (Memphis Grizzlies) (2/3)	
Jan 31 – Feb 6	LeBron James (Miami Heat) (4/5)	Kevin Durant (Oklahoma City Thunder) (1/2)	
Feb 7 – 13	Dwight Howard (Orlando Magic) (4/6)	LaMarcus Aldridge (Portland Trail Blazers) (2/2)	
Feb 21 – 27	Dwight Howard (Orlando Magic) (5/6)	Kevin Martin (Houston Rockets) (1/1)	
Feb 28 – Mar 6	Paul Pierce (Boston Celtics) (2/2)	Russell Westbrook (Oklahoma City Thunder) (4/4)	
Mar 7 – 13	Dwyane Wade (Miami Heat) (3/3)	Tony Parker (San Antonio Spurs) (2/2)	
Mar 14 – 20	LeBron James (Miami Heat) (5/5)	Kyle Lowry (Houston Rockets) (1/1)	
Mar 21 – 27	Dwight Howard (Orlando Magic) (6/6)	Kobe Bryant (Los Angeles Lakers) (1/1)	
Mar 28 – Apr 3	Carmelo Anthony (New York Knicks) (1/2)	Zach Randolph (Memphis Grizzlies) (3/3)	
Apr 4 – 10	Carmelo Anthony (New York Knicks) (2/2)	Kevin Durant (Oklahoma City Thunder) (2/2)	

=== Players of the month ===
The following players were named the Eastern and Western Conference Players of the Month.

Month	Eastern Conference	Western Conference	Ref.
October – November	Dwight Howard (Orlando Magic) (1/2)	Deron Williams (Utah Jazz) (1/1)	
December	LeBron James (Miami Heat) (1/3); Dwyane Wade (Miami Heat) (1/1)	Kevin Durant (Oklahoma City Thunder) (1/2)	
January	LeBron James (Miami Heat) (2/3)	Zach Randolph (Memphis Grizzlies) (1/1)	
February	Dwight Howard (Orlando Magic) (2/2)	LaMarcus Aldridge (Portland Trail Blazers) (1/1)	
March	Derrick Rose (Chicago Bulls) (1/1)	Kobe Bryant (Los Angeles Lakers) (1/1)	
April	LeBron James (Miami Heat) (3/3)	Kevin Durant (Oklahoma City Thunder) (2/2)	

=== Rookies of the month ===
The following players were named the Eastern and Western Conference Rookies of the Month.

Month	Eastern Conference	Western Conference	Ref.
October – November	Landry Fields (New York Knicks) (1/2)	Blake Griffin (Los Angeles Clippers) (1/6)	
December	Landry Fields (New York Knicks) (2/2)	Blake Griffin (Los Angeles Clippers) (2/6)	
January	John Wall (Washington Wizards) (1/4)	Blake Griffin (Los Angeles Clippers) (3/6)	
February	John Wall (Washington Wizards) (2/4)	Blake Griffin (Los Angeles Clippers) (4/6)	
March	John Wall (Washington Wizards) (3/4)	Blake Griffin (Los Angeles Clippers) (5/6)	
April	John Wall (Washington Wizards) (4/4)	Blake Griffin (Los Angeles Clippers) (6/6)	

=== Coaches of the month ===
The following coaches were named the Eastern and Western Conference Coaches of the Month.

Month	Eastern Conference	Western Conference	Ref.
October – November	Doc Rivers (Boston Celtics) (1/1)	Gregg Popovich (San Antonio Spurs) (1/2)	
December	Erik Spoelstra (Miami Heat) (1/1)	Gregg Popovich (San Antonio Spurs) (2/2)	
January	Tom Thibodeau (Chicago Bulls) (1/3)	Monty Williams (New Orleans Hornets) (1/1)	
February	Doug Collins (Philadelphia 76ers) (1/1)	Rick Carlisle (Dallas Mavericks) (1/1)	
March	Tom Thibodeau (Chicago Bulls) (2/3)	Phil Jackson (Los Angeles Lakers) (1/1)	
April	Tom Thibodeau (Chicago Bulls) (3/3)	Nate McMillan (Portland Trail Blazers) (1/1)	

== NBA All-Star break ==
The 2011 NBA All-Star Game was played on February 20, 2011, at Staples Center in Los Angeles. This game was the 61st edition of the National Basketball Association (NBA)'s annual basketball festivities, and was also the fifth All-Star Game held in Los Angeles; the city previously hosted in 1963, 1972, 1983 and 2004. As with the 2004 event, it was jointly hosted by the Lakers and the Clippers. The Western Conference All-Stars defeated the Eastern Conference 148–143, with the Lakers' Kobe Bryant named as MVP for the fourth time, tying the record of Bob Pettit.

== Salary cap ==
On July 7, the NBA announced that the salary cap for the 2010–11 season would be $58.044 million, an increase of $0.344 million from previous season's $57.70 million, and would go into effect on July 8 as the league's "moratorium period" had ended and teams could begin signing free agents and making trades. The increase came as a surprise as the league initially predicted a decrease in the salary cap. On March, before the playoffs, the league projected that the salary cap would be around $56.1 million. The tax level for the season was set at $70.307 million, with each team paying a $1 tax for each $1 by which it exceeds $70.307 million. The mid-level exception was $5.765 million for the season and the minimum team salary, which was set at 75% of the salary cap, was $43.533 million. The maximum salaries for players are set at $13.604 million for players with zero to six years of experience, $16.324 million for players with seven to nine years of experience, and $19.045 million for players with more than 10 years of experience.

== See also ==
- List of NBA regular season records
