= Andris Biedriņš =

Latvian basketball player (born 1986)

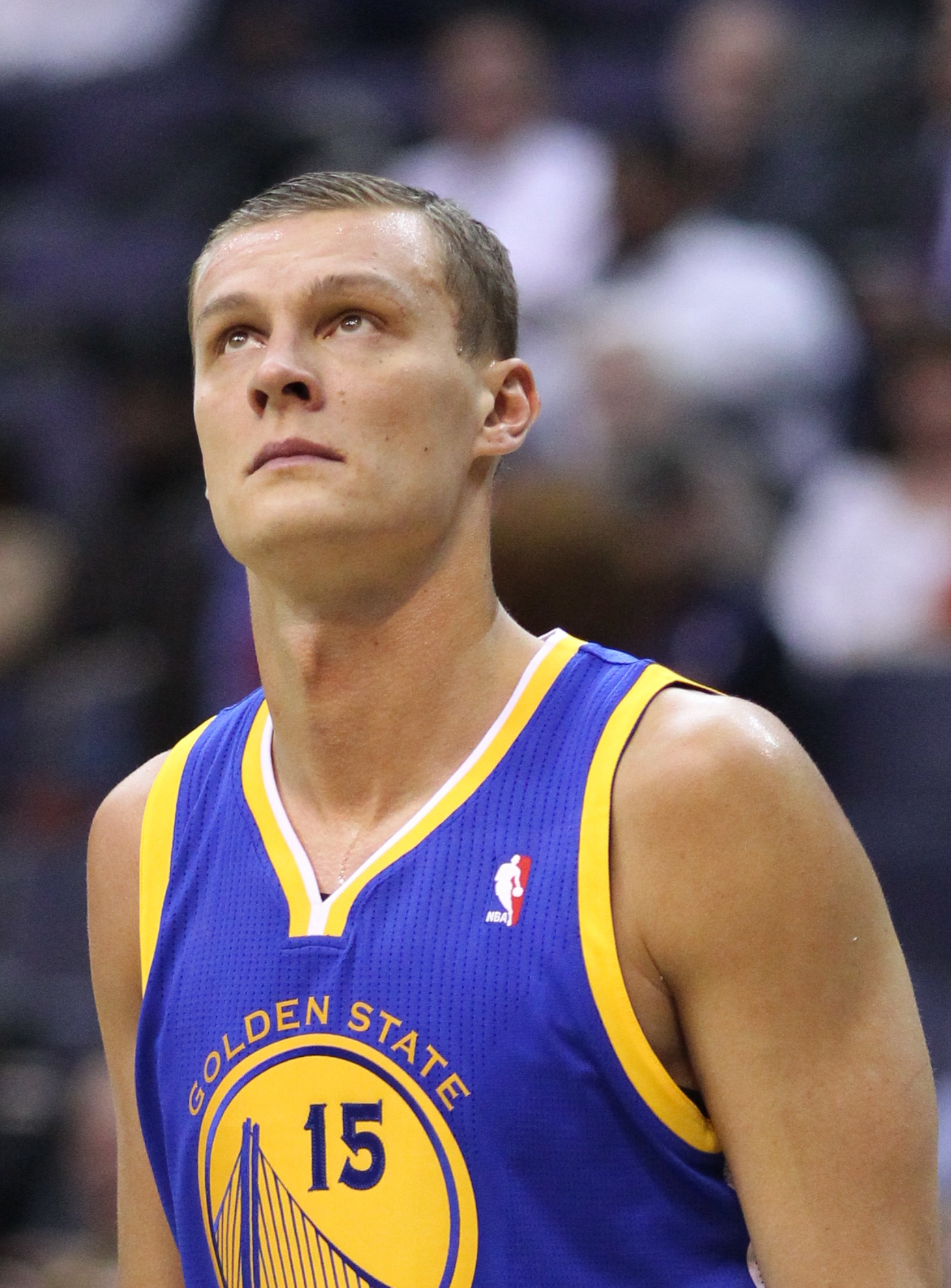
- Biedriņš with the Golden State Warriors in 2011

Personal information
- Born: 2 April 1986 (age 40) Riga, Latvian SSR, Soviet Union
- Listed height: 7 ft 0 in (2.13 m)
- Listed weight: 250 lb (113 kg)

Career information
- NBA draft: 2004: 1st round, 11th overall pick
- Drafted by: Golden State Warriors
- Playing career: 2002–2014
- Position: Center
- Number: 15, 11

Career history
- 2002–2004: BK Skonto
- 2004–2013: Golden State Warriors
- 2013–2014: Utah Jazz

Career highlights
- Latvian League Newcomer of the Year (2003)

Career NBA statistics
- Points: 3,247 (6.3 ppg)
- Rebounds: 3,631 (7.0 rpg)
- Blocks: 580 (1.1 bpg)
- Stats at NBA.com
- Stats at Basketball Reference

Andris Biedriņš (Latvian pronunciation: [ˈɐndris ˈbiædriɲʃ]; born 2 April 1986) is a Latvian former professional basketball player. He was drafted by the Golden State Warriors with the 11th overall pick in the 2004 NBA draft.

== Professional career ==
=== Skonto (2002–2004) ===
Biedriņš's professional career started at the Latvian team BK Skonto in the 2002–03 season, when he joined at the age of 16. He soon established himself as an impact player, appearing in 41 LBL games, averaging 2.9 points, 4.6 rebounds and 1.32 blocks, while shooting 59.8% from the field. For his feats, he was named as the Latvian League Newcomer of the Year. In eleven games for the FIBA European league (2003–2004), he averaged 18.6 points, 8.2 rebounds and 1.82 blocks. In his second year, Biedriņš appeared in 28 LBL games, averaging 18.0 points, 8.9 rebounds, 1.3 assists and 1.86 blocks, while shooting 61.5% from the field. After that season, Biedriņš made himself eligible for the 2004 NBA draft.

=== Golden State Warriors (2004–2013) ===
==== 2004–05 season ====
Biedriņš was drafted as the 11th pick in the first round by the Golden State Warriors. In his rookie season (2004–05), Biedriņš got little playing time, and often quickly got into foul trouble (3.6 points, 3.9 rebounds, 0.8 blocks and 2.9 fouls in 12.8 minutes, total 30 games). He also was the youngest player in the league during his rookie year as he was 18 years old at the time.

==== 2005–06 season ====
In his second year, the 2005–06 season, Biedriņš played in 68 games, posting 3.8 points and 4.2 rebounds, with 14.1 minutes per game. However, he failed to improve much, and was ridiculed for his poor free throw percentage (.306) and his inability to stay out of foul trouble, committing 190 fouls in exactly 1,000 minutes of playing time. The Golden State fan base was not kind to the sophomore; he was called "The One Minute Man" by the Golden State Warriors blog for his alleged inability to play without a foul for longer than these 60 seconds. Biedriņš made the news when he was involved in a car accident on his way to a home game on the 880 freeway in Oakland. His Porsche Cayenne Turbo was totalled in the accident, and he missed that night's game and the next game due to back spasms.

==== 2006–07 season ====
In his third year, Biedriņš got a lucky break when the Warriors decided to replace coach Mike Montgomery with ex-Dallas Mavericks coach Don Nelson, elected one of the NBA's "Greatest Coaches of All Time." Nelson needed just five games to bench the Warriors' center Adonal Foyle and give Biedriņš the starting spot at center, calling him "the best big man I've got." Biedriņš thrived in his new role, posting impressive averages of 10.3 points on an incredible .621 field goal percentage (1st in the NBA), 9.5 rebounds and 1.9 blocks per game and earning himself 28.9 minutes of playing time. His breakthrough game came in November 2006, when the Warriors beat the title favorites San Antonio Spurs 119–111. In this game, Biedriņš asserted himself against Spurs superstar Tim Duncan, only being narrowly outscored 18–22 and outrebounded 15–16, but did block six shots, including three straight shot attempts by Duncan in the third quarter. During this season he set career highs in points (31 vs Denver 24 November 2006), rebounds (18 vs Charlotte 2 March 2007), blocks (7 vs Denver 22 November 2006), assists (5 vs Washington 23 March 2007) and steals (5 vs Lakers 22 January 2007). He also finished fifth in Most Improved Player voting, losing to teammate Monta Ellis.

==== 2008–09 season ====
In July 2008, Biedriņš agreed to a new six-year contract for $54 million ($62 million including incentives) with the Golden State Warriors. The final year was a player option, which if exercised would keep him a Warrior until 2014. Biedriņš was named co-captain alongside Stephen Jackson. On January 27, Biedriņš pulled down a career high 26 rebounds against New York. He had set a career high in assists on December 19 against Atlanta with six. For the season, Biedriņš set career highs in points (11.9), rebounds (11.2), assists (two) and blocked shots (1.6) per game, starting in 58 of the 62 games in which he appeared.

==== 2009–10 season ====
In the 2009–10 season, Biedriņš appeared in only 33 games, starting 29, and was limited to 23.1 minutes per game, his lowest since his second season in the league (2005–2006). Injuries played a big role, as he was derailed with back and groin ailments that made him miss weeks at a time before he finally had groin surgery on March 10, ending his season. Biedriņš' free-throw percentage had dropped from 62% in 2007–08 to 55.1% in 2008–09; in 2009–10, he shot an appalling four-for-25 (16%). His other numbers dropped precipitously as well—five points, 7.8 rebounds and 1.3 blocks per game after career highs in all these stats in 2008–09. Additionally, Warriors coach Don Nelson repeatedly criticized Biedriņš for his lack of intensity and aggressiveness in his time on the floor. Biedriņš capped of the off-season by criticizing the team during an interview in his native Latvia.

==== 2010–11 season ====
The 2010–2011 season may have begun with some renewed hope for a resurgence of Biedriņš, as 2009–10 coach Don Nelson was fired and the potential existed for new head coach Keith Smart to unleash and reinvigorate the center's fragile confidence. Early returns were promising, as Biedriņš had several games in the early season with rebounding numbers at or around double-digits while averaging around thirty minutes per game, including 20 rebounds in a November 5 victory over the Utah Jazz, 28 points and 20 rebounds in a November 26 loss to the Memphis Grizzlies, and 18 rebounds in a November 30 loss to the San Antonio Spurs. However, the injury bug bit again, derailing Biedriņš from mid-December 2010 to early January 2011, and once again he found it difficult to regain his previous form. Biedriņš's slumping play and persistent foul issues convinced Smart to bench him in favor of rookie Ekpe Udoh for four games in March. He was reinstated into the starting lineup for five games until spraining his ankle on March 16, resulting in his being sidelined for the remainder of the season. Biedriņš's averages for the 2010–11 season amounted to five points, 7.2 rebounds and 0.9 blocks (both a drop from 2009 to 2010) on 53.4% field goal shooting and a modestly improved 32.3% free throw accuracy.

==== 2011–12 season ====
In the wake of the lockout which took away much of the 2011 NBA offseason and shortened the league's schedule considerably, the Warriors made a push to acquire restricted free agent DeAndre Jordan, who would have automatically taken over as the starting center for Golden State. Biedriņš might have been a logical amnesty candidate under the provisions of the NBA's new collective bargaining agreement, but the Warriors instead chose to amnesty Charlie Bell while retaining Biedriņš. The Warriors' push to acquire Jordan fell through when the Los Angeles Clippers matched the Warriors' offer sheet to Jordan, so they instead signed free agent center Kwame Brown. Biedriņš won the starting job to begin the year before being sidelined for three games with an ankle injury. When Brown was lost for the season with a torn pectoralis major muscle in the third of those games, Biedriņš once again took over as starter, where he remained until his continued ineffectiveness prompted first-year coach Mark Jackson to insert Ekpe Udoh in as starter. A March 13 trade which shipped Udoh, Brown and Monta Ellis to the Milwaukee Bucks for Stephen Jackson and the out-for-the-season Andrew Bogut thrust Biedriņš back into the starting lineup, where he remained until Jackson decided to give rookie Jeremy Tyler a chance to prove himself at the beginning of April. For the season, Biedriņš averaged 15.7 minutes (the lowest since his second year in the league), 1.7 points, 3.7 rebounds, 0.3 assists (all career lows), 1.0 blocks and 0.5 steals while shooting 60.9% from the floor and 11.1% from the free throw line (admittedly with the small sample size of one make in nine free throw attempts).

==== 2012–13 season ====
Biedriņš's struggles intensified during the 2012–13 season. Relatively healthy, he appeared in 53 games for 9.3 minutes per game, but attempted a grand total of only 21 shots (making 10, a 47.6% mark) and 13 free throws (making four, a 30.8% mark). For the season, Biedriņš averaged 0.5 points, 2.9 rebounds, 0.3 assists, 0.3 steals and 0.8 blocks.

=== Utah Jazz (2013–2014) ===
On July 5, 2013, the Warriors reportedly agreed to trade Biedriņš to the Utah Jazz along with teammates Brandon Rush and Richard Jefferson in an attempt to clear salary cap space to acquire coveted free agent Andre Iguodala. The trade became official on July 10. Biedriņš ended up only playing 6 games for the Jazz in the 2013 - 2014 season, with the 6th game actually being his final NBA game ever. Biedriņš played his final game on December 16, in a 94 - 117 loss to the Miami Heat where he recorded 1 rebound in 2 minutes of playing time.

On April 5, 2014, Biedriņš was waived by the Jazz.

== National team career ==
Biedriņš has been active for his native country Latvia since his teenage years. In 2001, the then-15-year-old Biedriņš was a member of the Latvian national team at the Euro Cadet Championship, where he finished 4th in scoring (16.3 ppg) and 3rd in rebounding (8.5 rpg). In 2002, Biedriņš participated in the Euro Junior Championship, where he averaged 6.6 points and 7.3 rebounds. He then competed in the 2004 Under-18 European Championship, averaging 21.8 points, 14.4 rebounds, 4.4 blocks and 3.8 steals. In a match against France, he played against fellow future NBA player Johan Petro, and Biedriņš scored 21 points and 16 rebounds. Other notable games were against Georgia (28 points, 11 rebounds) and Italy (26 points, 20 rebounds).

=== International stats ===
Tournament	Games played	Points per game	Rebounds per game	Assists per game
2007 EuroBasket	3	15.0	10.0	0.7
2009 EuroBasket	3	7.3	11.7	0.7

== Personal life ==
Biedriņš has one son, named Emīls.

Biedriņš is well known for his involvement in several charities. He was active in the Warriors community programs during his rookie season, participated in the team's Thanksgiving Food Serving at Patrick David's Cafe in Danville, California, hosted a half-time holiday party for underprivileged children at the Warriors game versus Memphis on December 22, attended the Warriors Kids Day celebration, as well as the Run With TMC Fantasy Camp reception, and also visited injured American troops just back from Iraq at the National Naval Medical Center outside of Washington, D.C., when the team was in the area in early March. His English language skills were poor when he came to the U.S., but he taught himself to speak English in six months while training in Los Angeles prior to the 2004 NBA draft.

== NBA career statistics ==
Legend
GP	Games played	GS	Games started	MPG	Minutes per game
FG%	Field goal percentage	3P%	3-point field goal percentage	FT%	Free throw percentage
RPG	Rebounds per game	APG	Assists per game	SPG	Steals per game
BPG	Blocks per game	PPG	Points per game	**Bold**	Career high
*	Led the league

=== Regular season ===
Year	Team	GP	GS	MPG	FG%	3P%	FT%	RPG	APG	SPG	BPG	PPG
2004–05	Golden State	30	1	12.8	.577	.000	.475	3.9	.4	.4	.8	3.6
2005–06	Golden State	68	2	14.7	.638	.000	.306	4.2	.4	.3	.7	3.8
2006–07	Golden State	**82***	**63**	29.0	.599	.000	.521	9.3	1.1	.8	**1.7**	9.5
2007–08	Golden State	76	59	27.3	.626*	.000	**.620**	9.8	1.0	.7	1.2	10.5
2008–09	Golden State	62	58	**30.0**	.578	.000	.551	**11.2**	**2.0**	**1.0**	1.5	**11.9**
2009–10	Golden State	33	29	23.1	.591	.000	.160	7.8	1.7	.6	1.3	5.0
2010–11	Golden State	59	55	23.7	.534	.000	.323	7.2	1.0	.9	.9	5.0
2011–12	Golden State	47	35	15.7	.609	.000	.111	3.7	.3	.5	1.0	1.7
2012–13	Golden State	53	9	9.3	.476	.000	.308	2.9	.3	.3	.8	.5
2013–14	Utah	6	0	7.5	**1.000**	.000	.167	2.8	.0	.0	.0	.5
Career		516	311	21.6	.594	.000	.500	7.0	.9	.6	1.1	6.3

=== Playoffs ===
Year	Team	GP	GS	MPG	FG%	3P%	FT%	RPG	APG	SPG	BPG	PPG
2007	Golden State	**11**	**8**	**24.3**	**.730**	.000	**.533**	**6.3**	**.5**	**.7**	**1.5**	**6.4**
2013	Golden State	3	0	5.7	.000	.000	.000	2.3	.3	.0	.7	.0
Career		14	8	20.3	.730	.000	.533	5.4	.4	.6	1.4	5.0

== See also ==
- List of National Basketball Association annual field goal percentage leaders
- List of European basketball players in the United States
