= Dorell Wright =

American basketball player (born 1985)

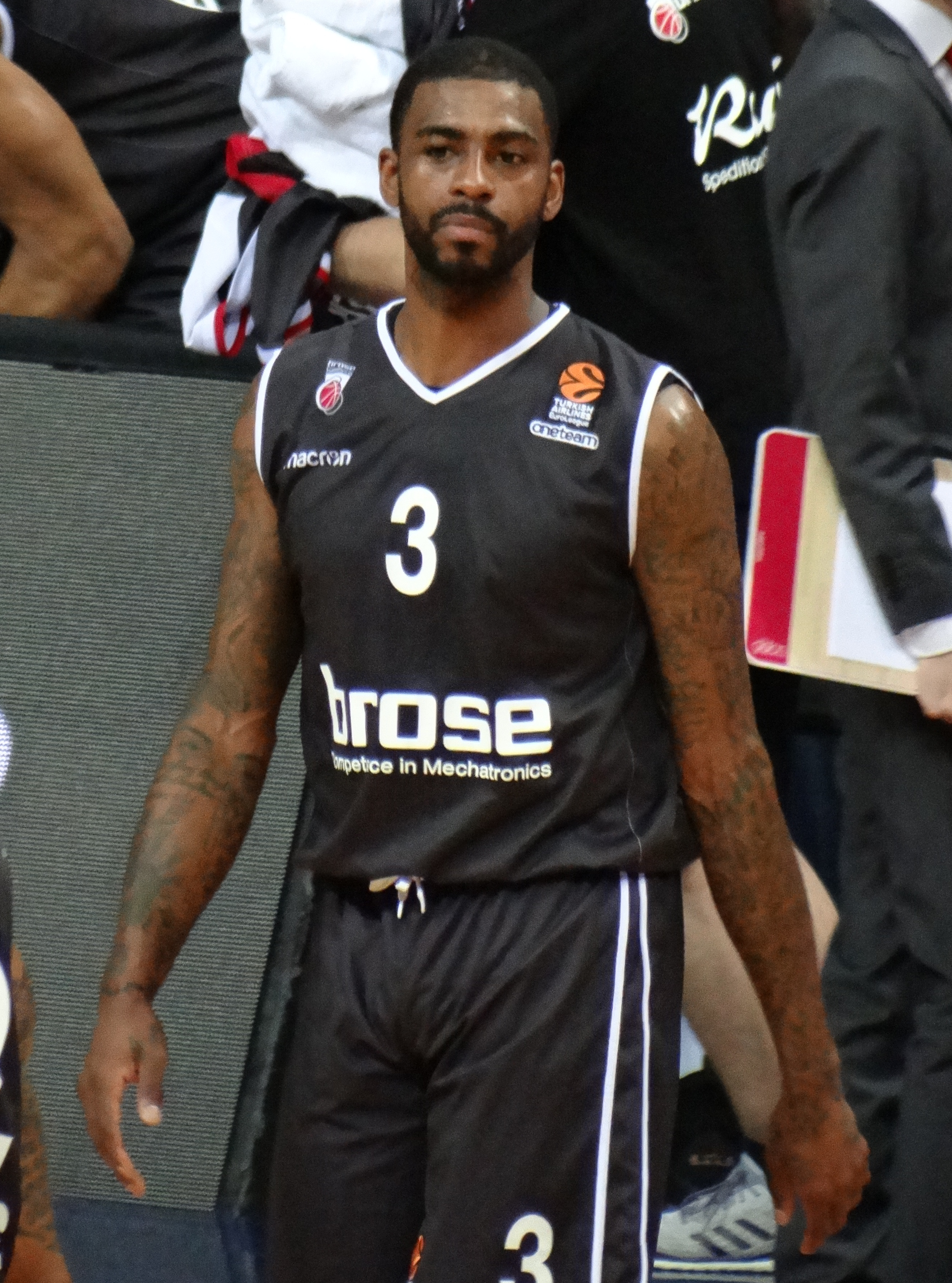
- Wright with Brose Bamberg in 2018

Personal information
- Born: December 2, 1985 (age 40) Los Angeles, California, U.S.
- Listed height: 6 ft 9 in (2.06 m)
- Listed weight: 205 lb (93 kg)

Career information
- High school: Leuzinger (Lawndale, California); South Kent (South Kent, Connecticut)
- NBA draft: 2004: 1st round, 19th overall pick
- Drafted by: Miami Heat
- Playing career: 2004–2020
- Position: Small forward
- Number: 1, 4, 11, 3

Career history
- 2004–2010: Miami Heat
- 2006: →Florida Flame
- 2010–2012: Golden State Warriors
- 2012–2013: Philadelphia 76ers
- 2013–2015: Portland Trail Blazers
- 2015–2016: Beikong Fly Dragons
- 2016: Miami Heat
- 2017: Igokea
- 2017–2018: Brose Bamberg
- 2018–2019: Lokomotiv Kuban
- 2019–2020: Igokea

Career highlights
- NBA champion (2006); VTB United League Sixth Man of the Year (2019)

Career statistics
- Points: 4,597 (8.4 ppg)
- Rebounds: 2,093 (3.8 rpg)
- Assists: 850 (1.5 apg)
- Stats at NBA.com
- Stats at Basketball Reference

Dorell Lawrence Wright (born December 2, 1985) is an American former professional basketball player. A small forward, he was drafted in the 2004 NBA draft by the Miami Heat directly out of high school. He also played for the Golden State Warriors, Philadelphia 76ers and Portland Trail Blazers. He once led the league in three-pointers made, and was selected to participate in the NBA Three-Point Contest in 2011.

== High school career ==
Wright attended Washington Preparatory High School in ninth and tenth grade before transferring to Leuzinger High School. After his senior year at Leuzinger, he enrolled as a fifth-year senior at South Kent School in Connecticut, where he averaged 29.4 points, 14 rebounds and 5 blocks per game in basketball.

Considered a five-star recruit by Rivals.com, Wright was listed as the No. 4 small forward and the No. 12 player in the nation in 2004. He initially committed to attend DePaul before entering the NBA draft.

== Professional career ==
=== Miami Heat (2004–2010) ===
Wright was selected 19th overall by the Heat in the 2004 NBA draft. On February 5, 2005, he made his professional debut in a 108–97 win over the Chicago Bulls.

On January 3, 2006, Wright was assigned to the Florida Flame of the NBA Development League. On January 18, he was recalled by the Heat. At the end of the year, he was the youngest member of the Heat's first NBA championship squad.

On August 21, 2008, Wright re-signed with the Heat.

=== Golden State Warriors (2010–2012) ===
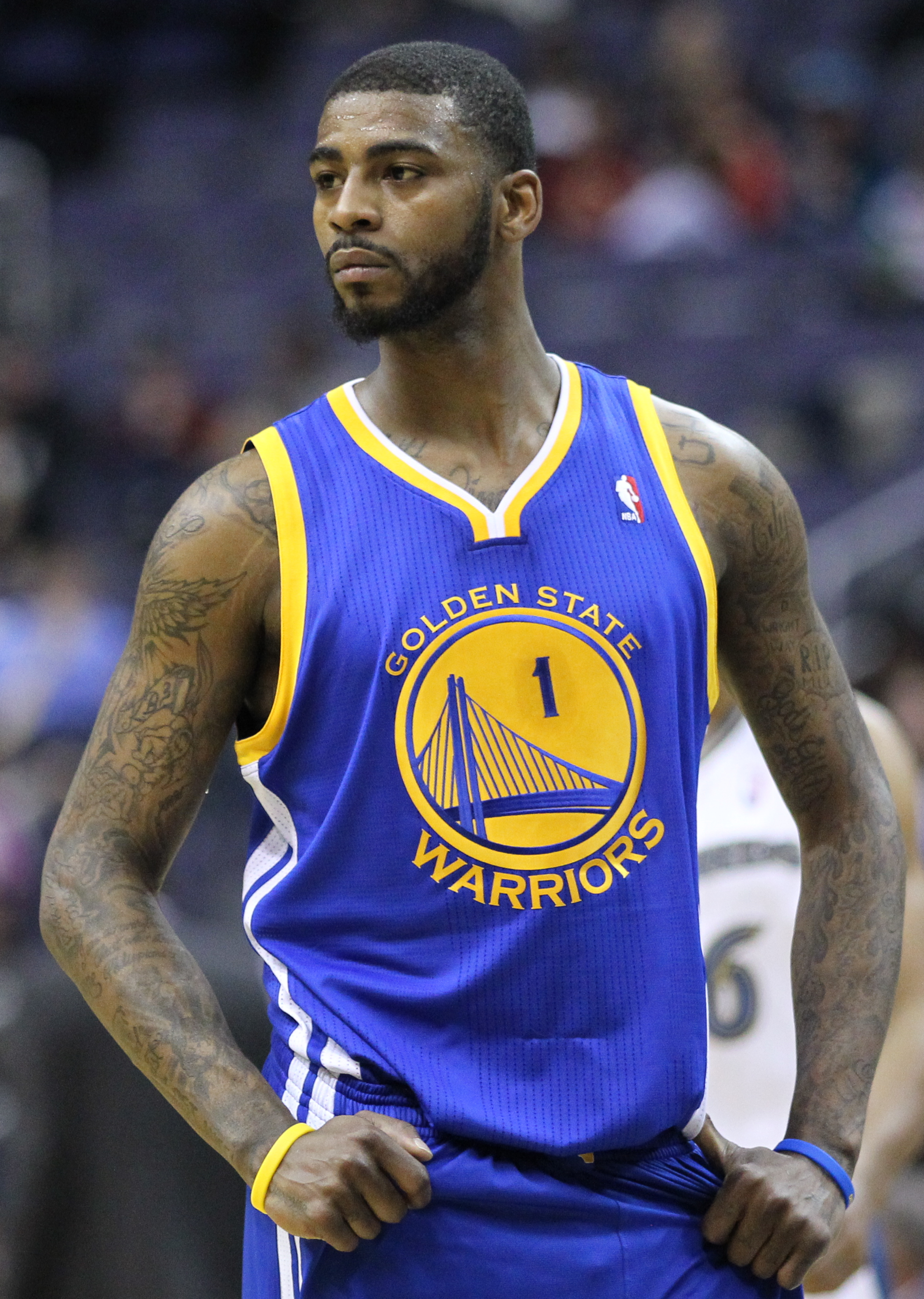
Wright with the Warriors in 2011

On July 12, 2010, Wright signed with the Golden State Warriors. On November 27, he set a franchise record with nine three-point field goals made, surpassing Jason Richardson's record of eight three-pointers set on March 29, 2007. On February 8, 2011, he was selected to compete in the 3-Point Shootout at the 2011 NBA All-Star Weekend in Los Angeles.

On March 18, 2011, against the Phoenix Suns, Wright went scoreless in the first half, but scored 30 points in the second half in a 108–97 loss. He finished the game with 30 points, 6 rebounds, 2 assists, and 2 blocks. On March 23, he scored a career-high 34 points to go with 5 rebounds and 6 assists against the Houston Rockets in a 131–112 loss.

On April 6, 2011, Wright set a Warriors franchise record for three-point shots made in a season with 184 in a home win versus the Los Angeles Lakers, beating Jason Richardson's previous record of 183 in the 2005–06 season. On April 13, 2011, he became the first player in NBA history to have scored more points in his seventh season than all of his first six combined in a win against the Portland Trail Blazers. He also ended the season with the most three-point shots made in the 2010–11 season with 194, as well as the most three-point field goals attempted with 516, both of which set Warriors franchise records. The records were surpassed by Stephen Curry in the 2012–13 season, when Curry set the NBA record for three-point field goals made.

After the 2010–11 season, Wright finished third in voting for NBA Most Improved Player, behind LaMarcus Aldridge and Kevin Love.

=== Philadelphia 76ers (2012–2013) ===
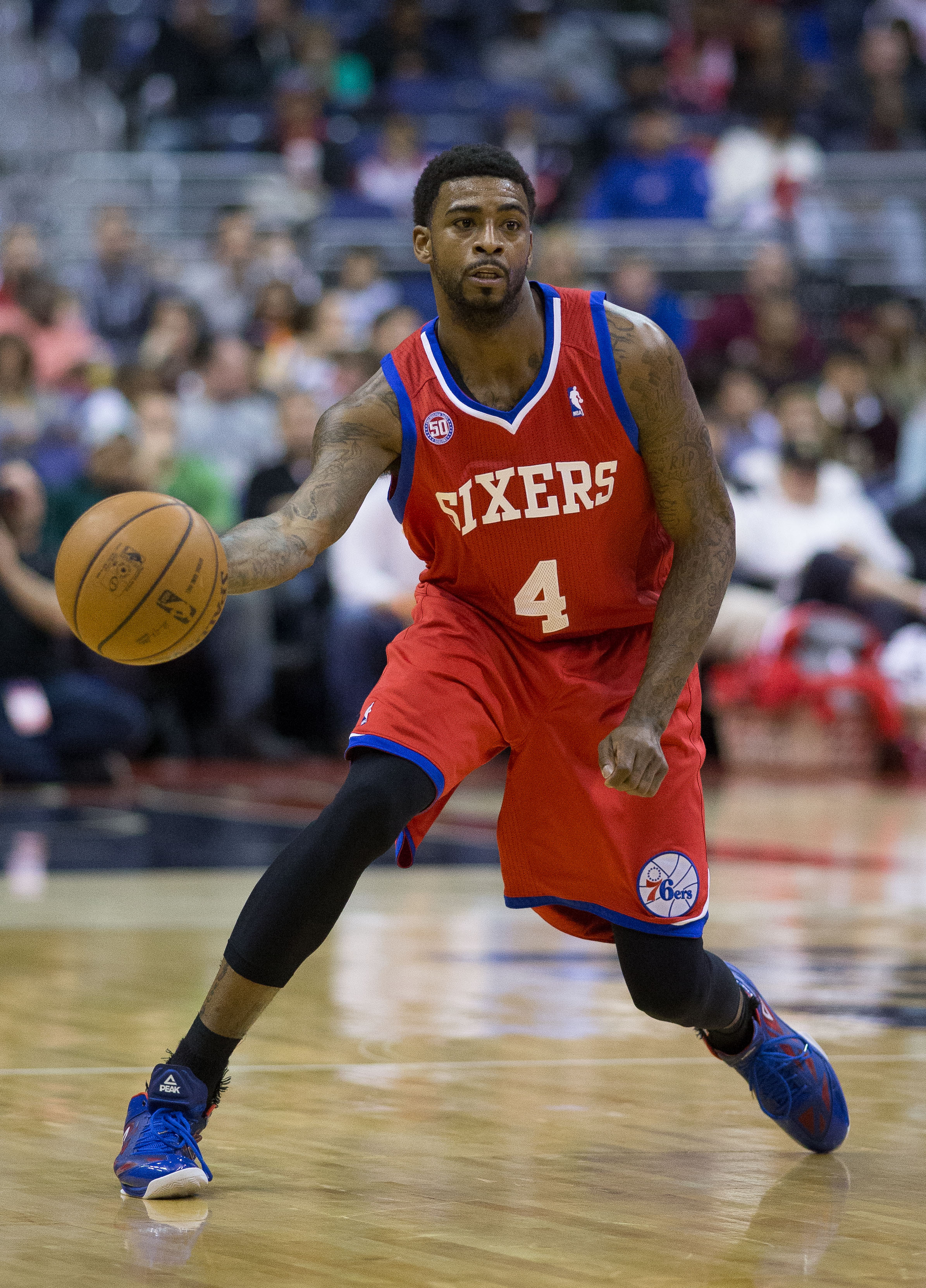
Wright with the 76ers in 2013

On July 11, 2012, Wright was traded to the Philadelphia 76ers in a three-team trade. On October 31, 2012, he made his debut for the 76ers in an 84–75 win over to the Denver Nuggets, recording three points, one rebound and one assist in 16 minutes.

=== Portland Trail Blazers (2013–2015) ===
On July 10, 2013, Wright signed with the Portland Trail Blazers. On October 30, 2013, he made his debut for the Trail Blazers in a 104–91 loss to the Phoenix Suns, recording three points, one rebound and one assist in 16 minutes.

=== Beikong Fly Dragons (2015–2016) ===
On August 17, 2015, Wright signed with the Beikong Fly Dragons of the Chinese Basketball Association. In 37 games for the Dragons, he averaged 24.3 points, 7.5 rebounds, 2.5 assists and 2.0 steals per game.

=== Return to the Heat (2016) ===
On April 12, 2016, Wright signed with the Miami Heat, returning to the franchise for a second stint. On April 17, Wright checked in during the final minutes of a 123–91 win over the Charlotte Hornets in Game 1 of the first round of the playoffs. He received a standing ovation from what remained of the home crowd. In his first appearance for the Heat in six years, he scored eight points on 3-of-3 shooting.

Wright's final NBA game was Game 7 of the 2016 Eastern Conference Semifinals on May 15, 2016, in a 89–116 loss to the Toronto Raptors. This was the only game of the series that Wright played in and he played for 2 and half minutes (substituting in at the very end of the 4th quarter for Goran Dragic). Wright recorded 2 points and 1 rebound.

On September 26, 2016, Wright signed with the Los Angeles Clippers, but was waived on October 12 after appearing in two preseason games.

=== Europe (2017–2020) ===
On October 3, 2017, Wright signed with Igokea for the 2017–18 season. After only four games he left Igokea and on October 27, 2017, he signed with German club Brose Bamberg for the rest of the season. On July 20, 2018, Wright signed a one-year deal with Lokomotiv Kuban of the VTB United League.

=== Retirement and later ventures ===
On November 18, 2020, Wright announced his retirement from professional basketball on his Instagram page, after a 16-year career in the NBA, China, and Europe. As of 2020, Wright has worked as a studio analyst for NBC Sports Bay Area on pre-game and post-game coverage.

== Career statistics ==
Legend
GP	Games played	GS	Games started	MPG	Minutes per game
FG%	Field goal percentage	3P%	3-point field goal percentage	FT%	Free throw percentage
RPG	Rebounds per game	APG	Assists per game	SPG	Steals per game
BPG	Blocks per game	PPG	Points per game	**Bold**	Career high
†	Won an NBA championship	*	Led the league

=== Regular season ===
Year	Team	GP	GS	MPG	FG%	3P%	FT%	RPG	APG	SPG	BPG	PPG
2004–05	Miami	3	0	9.0	.273	.000	**1.000**	.3	1.0	1.3	.0	2.3
2005–06	Miami	20	2	6.6	.465	**.500**	.882	1.6	.4	.2	.1	2.9
2006–07	Miami	66	19	19.6	.445	.147	.744	4.1	1.4	.6	.7	6.0
2007–08	Miami	44	34	25.1	**.488**	.364	.826	5.0	1.4	.7	**.9**	7.9
2008–09	Miami	6	0	12.2	.400	—	.333	3.3	.3	.3	.0	3.0
2009–10	Miami	72	1	20.8	.463	.389	.884	3.3	1.3	.7	.4	7.1
2010–11	Golden State	**82**	**82***	**38.4**	.423	.376	.789	**5.3**	**3.0**	**1.5**	.8	**16.4**
2011–12	Golden State	61	61	27.0	.422	.360	.816	4.6	1.5	1.0	.4	10.3
2012–13	Philadelphia	79	8	22.6	.396	.374	.851	3.8	1.9	.8	.4	9.2
2013–14	Portland	68	13	14.5	.374	.342	.754	2.8	.9	.3	.2	5.0
2014–15	Portland	48	2	12.6	.379	.380	.810	2.3	.9	.4	.2	4.6
Career		549	222	22.4	.424	.365	.806	3.8	1.5	.8	.5	8.4

=== Playoffs ===
Year	Team	GP	GS	MPG	FG%	3P%	FT%	RPG	APG	SPG	BPG	PPG
2007	Miami	1	0	1.0	—	—	—	.0	.0	.0	.0	.0
2009	Miami	1	0	3.0	—	—	—	.0	.0	.0	.0	.0
2010	Miami	5	0	**22.4**	.360	.250	**1.000**	**3.8**	**1.8**	**.4**	.0	**5.0**
2014	Portland	**8**	0	11.0	.368	.333	.733	2.0	.4	**.4**	**1.1**	3.6
2016	Miami	5	0	3.8	**.500**	**.400**	**.1000**	1.2	.4	.0	.0	3.2
Career		20	0	11.2	.389	.320	.833	2.1	.7	.3	.5	3.5

=== EuroLeague ===
Year	Team	GP	GS	MPG	FG%	3P%	FT%	RPG	APG	SPG	BPG	PPG	PIR
2017–18	Brose Bamberg	27	22	25.8	.421	.422	.873	5.4	1.7	.9	.4	11.6	12.8
Career		27	22	25.8	.421	.422	.873	5.4	1.7	.9	.4	11.6	12.8

== Personal life ==
In August 2014, Wright married long-time girlfriend Mia Lee. He is the older brother of New York Knicks guard Delon Wright.

Wright played Sevyn Streeter's love interest in the music video of Streeter's "It Won't Stop".

== See also ==
- List of NBA season leaders in three-point field goals
