= 2010–11 Golden State Warriors season =

NBA professional basketball team season

- Head coach: Keith Smart
- General manager: Larry Riley
- Owners: Joe Lacob
- Arena: Oracle Arena

Results
- Record: 36–46 (.439)
- Place: Division: 3rd (Pacific); Conference: 12th (Western)
- Playoff finish: Did not qualify
- Stats at Basketball Reference

The 2010–11 Golden State Warriors season was the 65th season of the franchise in the National Basketball Association (NBA) and its 49th in the San Francisco Bay Area. It was the first season under their new primary logo, which harkened back to the classic blue and gold logos worn by the team prior to the 1997–98 Golden State Warriors season.

Until the 2025–26 season, this was the last Warriors team to finish below .500 in a full season.

== Draft ==
Round	Pick	Player	Position	Nationality	School / club team
1	6	Ekpe Udoh	C	United States	Baylor (Jr.)

== Roster ==
2010-11 Golden State Warriors roster
Players

Pos.	No.	Player	Height	Weight	DOB	From
F	4	Jeff Adrien	6 ft 7 in (2.01 m)	245 lb (111 kg)		Connecticut
F	19	Louis Amundson	6 ft 9 in (2.06 m)	225 lb (102 kg)		UNLV
G	34	Charlie Bell	6 ft 3 in (1.91 m)	200 lb (91 kg)		Michigan State
C	15	Andris Biedriņš	7 ft 0 in (2.13 m)	240 lb (109 kg)		Latvia
G	30	Stephen Curry	6 ft 3 in (1.91 m)	185 lb (84 kg)		Davidson
G	8	Monta Ellis	6 ft 3 in (1.91 m)	180 lb (82 kg)		LHS (MS)
G	2	Acie Law	6 ft 3 in (1.91 m)	202 lb (92 kg)		Texas A&M
F/C	10	David Lee	6 ft 9 in (2.06 m)	250 lb (113 kg)		Florida
G	7	Jeremy Lin	6 ft 3 in (1.91 m)	200 lb (91 kg)		Harvard
F	77	Vladimir Radmanović	6 ft 10 in (2.08 m)	235 lb (107 kg)		Serbia
F	23	Al Thornton	6 ft 8 in (2.03 m)	235 lb (107 kg)		Florida State
F	20	Ekpe Udoh	6 ft 10 in (2.08 m)	240 lb (109 kg)		Baylor
F	55	Reggie Williams	6 ft 6 in (1.98 m)	210 lb (95 kg)		VMI
F	1	Dorell Wright	6 ft 9 in (2.06 m)	210 lb (95 kg)		South Kent Prep

Coaches
Head coach
- Keith Smart
Assistant(s)
- Jerry Sichting
- Calbert Cheaney
- Robert Werdann
- Mark Price
- Lloyd Pierce

Legend
- (DP) Unsigned draft pick
- (FA) Free agent
- (S) Suspended
- Injured

Roster
Updated: 2011-02-23

== Pre-season ==
2010 pre-season game log
Total: 3–5 (Home: 3–0; Road: 0–5)
Pre-season: 3–5 (home: 3–0; road: 0–5)

Game	Date	Team	Score	High points	High rebounds	High assists	Location Attendance	Record
1	October 8	L.A. Clippers	W 127–87	Monta Ellis (22)	Andris Biedriņš (10)	Stephen Curry (6)	Oracle Arena; 10,004	1–0
2	October 10	Sacramento	W 95–86	Monta Ellis (18)	Jeff Adrien (15)	Monta Ellis (6)	Oracle Arena; 10,537	2–0
3	October 12	@ Sacramento	L 97–116	Monta Ellis (18)	David Lee (10)	Monta Ellis (4)	ARCO Arena; 10,786	2–1
4	October 16	@ Portland	L 105–118	Curry, Lee (17)	David Lee (11)	Stephen Curry (11)	Rose Garden; 19,727	2–2
5	October 18	Portland	W 100–78	Monta Ellis (22)	David Lee (12)	Stephen Curry (6)	Oracle Arena; 11,246	3–2
6	October 19	@ Phoenix	L 87–92	Monta Ellis (29)	Lee, Biedriņš (9)	Monta Ellis (5)	US Airways Center; 14,635	3–3
7	October 21	@ L.A. Lakers	L 99–120	Stephen Curry (19)	Andris Biedriņš (13)	Dorell Wright (6)	San Diego Sports Arena; 11,150	3–4
8	October 22	@ L.A. Lakers	L 102–105	Monta Ellis (41)	David Lee (14)	Reggie Williams (8)	Citizens Business Bank Arena; 10,556	3–5

2010–11 season schedule

== Regular season ==
=== Standings ===
Pacific Division	W	L	PCT	GB	Home	Road	Div
y-Los Angeles Lakers	57	25	.695	–	30–11	27–14	12–4
Phoenix Suns	40	42	.488	17	23–18	17–24	9–7
Golden State Warriors	36	46	.439	21	26–15	10–31	5–11
Los Angeles Clippers	32	50	.390	25	23–18	9–32	7–9
Sacramento Kings	24	58	.293	33	11–30	13–28	7–9

#	Western Conference				
#	Team	W	L	PCT	GB
1	c-San Antonio Spurs	61	21	.744	–
2	y-Los Angeles Lakers	57	25	.695	4
3	x-Dallas Mavericks	57	25	.695	4
4	y-Oklahoma City Thunder	55	27	.671	6
5	x-Denver Nuggets	50	32	.610	11
6	x-Portland Trail Blazers	48	34	.585	13
7	x-New Orleans Hornets	46	36	.561	15
8	x-Memphis Grizzlies	46	36	.561	15
9	Houston Rockets	43	39	.524	18
10	Phoenix Suns	40	42	.488	21
11	Utah Jazz	39	43	.476	22
12	Golden State Warriors	36	46	.439	25
13	Los Angeles Clippers	32	50	.390	29
14	Sacramento Kings	24	58	.293	37
15	Minnesota Timberwolves	17	65	.207	44

=== Game log ===
2010–11 game log
Total: 36–46 (Home: 26–15; Road: 10–31)
October: 2–1 (home: 2–0; road: 0–1)

Game	Date	Team	Score	High points	High rebounds	High assists	Location Attendance	Record
1	October 27	Houston	W 132–128	Monta Ellis (46)	David Lee (15)	Stephen Curry (11)	Oracle Arena; 18,428	1–0
2	October 29	L.A. Clippers	W 109–91	Dorell Wright (24)	David Lee (12)	Stephen Curry (11)	Oracle Arena; 17,408	2–0
3	October 31	@ L.A. Lakers	L 83–107	Monta Ellis (20)	Biedriņš, Carney (8)	Biedriņš, Williams (4)	Staples Center; 18,997	2–1

November: 6–9 (home: 3–3; road: 3–6)

Game	Date	Team	Score	High points	High rebounds	High assists	Location Attendance	Record
4	November 3	Memphis	W 115–109	Monta Ellis (39)	David Lee (16)	Ellis, Williams (8)	Oracle Arena; 16,607	3–1
5	November 5	Utah	W 85–78	Monta Ellis (23)	Andris Biedriņš (20)	Stephen Curry (6)	Oracle Arena; 17,902	4–1
6	November 7	@ Detroit	L 97–102	Monta Ellis (24)	Andris Biedriņš (13)	Stephen Curry (6)	The Palace of Auburn Hills; 12,813	4–2
7	November 8	@ Toronto	W 109–102	Stephen Curry (34)	David Lee (12)	Stephen Curry (4)	Air Canada Centre; 14,127	5–2
8	November 10	@ New York	W 122–117	David Lee (28)	David Lee (10)	Stephen Curry (8)	Madison Square Garden; 19,763	6–2
9	November 11	@ Chicago	L 90–120	Monta Ellis (24)	Dorell Wright (8)	Stephen Curry (6)	United Center; 21,140	6–3
10	November 13	@ Milwaukee	L 72–79	Monta Ellis (24)	Andris Biedriņš (9)	Monta Ellis (8)	Bradley Center; 17,049	6–4
11	November 15	Detroit	W 101–97	Monta Ellis (27)	Dan Gadzuric (11)	Dorell Wright (6)	Oracle Arena; 19,123	7–4
12	November 19	New York	L 119–125	Monta Ellis (40)	Andris Biedriņš (8)	Stephen Curry (8)	Oracle Arena; 19,808	7–5
13	November 21	@ L.A. Lakers	L 89–117	Dorell Wright (16)	Jeff Adrien (10)	Bell, Ellis (3)	Staples Center; 18,997	7–6
14	November 22	Denver	L 89–106	Monta Ellis (20)	Dan Gadzuric (11)	Stephen Curry (5)	Oracle Arena; 18,023	7–7
15	November 24	@ Houston	L 101–111	Dorell Wright (24)	Andris Biedriņš (10)	Stephen Curry (6)	Toyota Center; 13,847	7–8
16	November 26	@ Memphis	L 111–116	Andris Biedriņš (28)	Andris Biedriņš (21)	Ellis, Wright (8)	FedExForum; 14,753	7–9
17	November 27	@ Minnesota	W 104–94	Dorell Wright (30)	Andris Biedriņš (12)	Monta Ellis (10)	Target Center; 14,440	8–9
18	November 30	San Antonio	L 98–118	Stephen Curry (32)	Andris Biedriņš (18)	Curry, Lee (5)	Oracle Arena; 17,877	8–10

December: 5–9 (home: 3–3; road: 2–6)

Game	Date	Team	Score	High points	High rebounds	High assists	Location Attendance	Record
19	December 2	Phoenix	L 101–107	Monta Ellis (38)	Dorell Wright (10)	3 players tied (7)	Oracle Arena; 18,328	8–11
20	December 5	@ Oklahoma City	L 109–114	Stephen Curry (39)	Dorell Wright (11)	Stephen Curry (6)	Oklahoma City Arena; 18,203	8–12
21	December 7	@ Dallas	L 100–105	Stephen Curry (21)	Biedriņš, Wright (11)	Ellis, Lee (7)	American Airlines Center; 19,593	8–13
22	December 8	@ San Antonio	L 94–111	Reggie Williams (31)	David Lee (13)	Ellis, Lee (6)	AT&T Center; 16,913	8–14
23	December 10	Miami	L 84–106	Monta Ellis (20)	Dorell Wright (10)	Monta Ellis (7)	Oracle Arena; 20,036	8–15
24	December 13	@ Utah	L 95–108	Dorell Wright (20)	Biedriņš, Lee (12)	Reggie Williams (6)	EnergySolutions Arena; 19,176	8–16
25	December 14	Minnesota	W 108–99	Monta Ellis (34)	Andris Biedriņš (12)	Monta Ellis (6)	Oracle Arena; 17,615	9–16
26	December 18	@ Portland	L 95–96	Monta Ellis (26)	David Lee (11)	Monta Ellis (5)	Rose Garden; 20,398	9–17
27	December 20	Houston	L 112–121	Monta Ellis (44)	Amundson, Udoh (7)	Monta Ellis (7)	Oracle Arena; 19,256	9–18
28	December 21	@ Sacramento	W 117–109 (OT)	Monta Ellis (36)	David Lee (12)	Monta Ellis (7)	ARCO Arena; 13,740	10–18
29	December 25	Portland	W 109–102	Monta Ellis (39)	Dorell Wright (8)	Stephen Curry (11)	Oracle Arena; 19,596	11–18
30	December 27	Philadelphia	W 110–95	Dorell Wright (28)	David Lee (16)	Monta Ellis (12)	Oracle Arena; 19,208	12–18
31	December 29	@ Atlanta	L 93–103	Dorell Wright (32)	Dorell Wright (11)	Stephen Curry (12)	Philips Arena; 15,925	12–19
32	December 31	@ Charlotte	W 96–95	Monta Ellis (25)	Amundson, Lee (8)	Monta Ellis (5)	Time Warner Cable Arena; 16,249	13–19

January: 7–8 (home: 6–4; road: 1–4)

Game	Date	Team	Score	High points	High rebounds	High assists	Location Attendance	Record
33	January 1	@ Miami	L 107–114	Dorell Wright (30)	David Lee (12)	Monta Ellis (7)	American Airlines Arena; 20,254	13–20
34	January 3	@ Orlando	L 90–110	Monta Ellis (20)	Monta Ellis (7)	Stephen Curry (5)	Amway Center; 18,846	13–21
35	January 5	@ New Orleans	W 110–103	Monta Ellis (29)	Louis Amundson (12)	Curry, Ellis (4)	New Orleans Arena; 13,532	14–21
36	January 7	Cleveland	W 116–98	Monta Ellis (32)	David Lee (14)	Monta Ellis (10)	Oracle Arena; 18,858	15–21
37	January 9	@ L.A. Clippers	L 91–105	Dorell Wright (27)	Dan Gadzuric (7)	Monta Ellis (6)	Staples Center; 17,696	15–22
38	January 12	L.A. Lakers	L 110–115	Monta Ellis (38)	Lee, Wright (7)	Stephen Curry (10)	Oracle Arena; 19,596	15–23
39	January 14	L.A. Clippers	W 122–112	Monta Ellis (30)	David Lee (9)	Ellis, Lee (6)	Oracle Arena; 19,273	16–23
40	January 17	New Jersey	W 109–100	Monta Ellis (26)	David Lee (10)	Monta Ellis (9)	Oracle Arena; 18,563	17–23
41	January 19	Indiana	W 110–108	Monta Ellis (36)	David Lee (9)	Stephen Curry (7)	Oracle Arena; 18,185	18–23
42	January 21	Sacramento	W 119–112 (OT)	Stephen Curry (34)	Dorell Wright (12)	Monta Ellis (9)	Oracle Arena; 18,428	19–23
43	January 22	@ L.A. Clippers	L 109–113	Stephen Curry (32)	David Lee (15)	Stephen Curry (8)	Staples Center; 19,373	19–24
44	January 24	San Antonio	L 102–113	David Lee (31)	David Lee (12)	Dorell Wright (9)	Oracle Arena; 18,523	19–25
45	January 26	New Orleans	L 103–112	Monta Ellis (26)	David Lee (10)	Stephen Curry (6)	Oracle Arena; 18,108	19–26
46	January 28	Charlotte	L 113–121 (OT)	Stephen Curry (27)	Andris Biedriņš (12)	Ellis, Wright (6)	Oracle Arena; 18,407	19–27
47	January 30	Utah	W 96–81	Stephen Curry (27)	Louis Amundson (11)	Stephen Curry (7)	Oracle Arena; 18,187	20–27

February: 6–5 (home: 5–3; road: 1–2)

Game	Date	Team	Score	High points	High rebounds	High assists	Location Attendance	Record
48	February 3	Milwaukee	W 100–94	Monta Ellis (24)	Andris Biedriņš (10)	Ellis, Wright (6)	Oracle Arena; 18,008	21–27
49	February 5	Chicago	W 101–90	Monta Ellis (33)	Andris Biedriņš (8)	Stephen Curry (8)	Oracle Arena; 19,596	22–27
50	February 7	Phoenix	L 92–104	Monta Ellis (21)	Monta Ellis (12)	Stephen Curry (8)	Oracle Arena; 18,002	22–28
51	February 9	Denver	W 116–114	Monta Ellis (37)	Biedriņš, Lee (12)	Dorell Wright (8)	Oracle Arena; 18,430	23–28
52	February 10	@ Phoenix	L 88–112	Williams, Udoh (16)	Ekpe Udoh (7)	Reggie Williams (6)	US Airways Center; 16,731	23–29
53	February 13	Oklahoma City	W 100–94	Monta Ellis (33)	David Lee (19)	Stephen Curry (13)	Oracle Arena; 19,596	24–29
54	February 15	New Orleans	W 102–89	Monta Ellis (21)	Ekpe Udoh (7)	Stephen Curry (8)	Oracle Arena; 18,276	25–29
55	February 16	@ Utah	W 107–100	Monta Ellis (35)	Andris Biedriņš (9)	Monta Ellis (7)	EnergySolutions Arena; 19,911	26–29
All-Star Break
56	February 22	Boston	L 93–115	Dorell Wright (19)	Udoh, Wright (6)	Acie Law (5)	Oracle Arena; 19,738	26–30
57	February 25	Atlanta	L 79–95	David Lee (20)	David Lee (10)	Curry, Ellis (5)	Oracle Arena; 19,858	26–31
58	February 27	@ Minnesota	L 123–126	Stephen Curry (33)	Stephen Curry (11)	Monta Ellis (8)	Target Center; 16,021	26–32

March: 6–12 (home: 4–1; road: 2–11)

Game	Date	Team	Score	High points	High rebounds	High assists	Location Attendance	Record
59	March 1	@ Indiana	L 100–109	Reggie Williams (25)	David Lee (11)	Stephen Curry (7)	Conseco Fieldhouse; 9,557	26–33
60	March 2	@ Washington	W 106–102	Stephen Curry (29)	David Lee (16)	David Lee (6)	Verizon Center; 17,865	27–33
61	March 4	@ Boston	L 103–107	Monta Ellis (41)	David Lee (12)	Stephen Curry (5)	TD Garden; 18,624	27–34
62	March 6	@ Philadelphia	L 117–125 (OT)	Monta Ellis (27)	David Lee (14)	Stephen Curry (7)	Wells Fargo Center; 11,294	27–35
63	March 8	@ Cleveland	W 95–85	Monta Ellis (24)	David Lee (14)	Monta Ellis (7)	Quicken Loans Arena; 19,919	28–35
64	March 9	@ New Jersey	L 90–94	David Lee (17)	David Lee (10)	Monta Ellis (4)	Prudential Center; 13,513	28–36
65	March 11	Orlando	W 123–120 (OT)	Monta Ellis (39)	3 players tied (6)	Stephen Curry (12)	Oracle Arena; 19,596	29–36
66	March 13	Minnesota	W 100–77	Stephen Curry (24)	Stephen Curry (9)	Stephen Curry (6)	Oracle Arena; 17,788	30–36
67	March 14	@ Sacramento	L 119–129	Al Thornton (23)	Lee, Radmanović (4)	Monta Ellis (9)	Power Balance Pavilion; 14,243	30–37
68	March 16	Dallas	L 106–112	Monta Ellis (26)	David Lee (9)	Monta Ellis (11)	Oracle Arena; 19,596	30–38
69	March 18	@ Phoenix	L 97–108	Dorell Wright (30)	David Lee (10)	Stephen Curry (5)	US Airways Center; 18,422	30–39
70	March 20	@ Dallas	L 73–101	Monta Ellis (18)	David Lee (12)	Stephen Curry (6)	American Airlines Center; 20,324	30–40
71	March 21	@ San Antonio	L 96–111	Ekpe Udoh (15)	David Lee (9)	Monta Ellis (4)	AT&T Center; 18,443	30–41
72	March 23	@ Houston	L 112–131	Dorell Wright (34)	David Lee (9)	Curry, Wright (6)	Toyota Center; 16,623	30–42
73	March 25	Toronto	W 138–100	Monta Ellis (27)	David Lee (7)	Monta Ellis (10)	Oracle Arena; 17,504	31–42
74	March 27	Washington	W 114–104	Monta Ellis (37)	David Lee (12)	Monta Ellis (13)	Oracle Arena; 17,723	32–42
75	March 29	@ Oklahoma City	L 114–115 (OT)	Stephen Curry (35)	David Lee (15)	Monta Ellis (11)	Oklahoma City Arena; 18,203	32–43
76	March 30	@ Memphis	L 91–110	Ellis, Wright (16)	David Lee (9)	Stephen Curry (9)	FedExForum; 13,815	32–44

April: 4–2 (home: 3–1; road: 1–1)

Game	Date	Team	Score	High points	High rebounds	High assists	Location Attendance	Record
77	April 2	Dallas	W 99–92	Monta Ellis (32)	Louis Amundson (10)	Stephen Curry (8)	Oracle Arena; 18,128	33–44
78	April 5	@ Portland	W 108–87	Monta Ellis (30)	David Lee (20)	Monta Ellis (5)	Rose Garden; 20,551	34–44
79	April 6	L.A. Lakers	W 95–87	Monta Ellis (26)	David Lee (17)	Monta Ellis (6)	Oracle Arena; 20,024	35–44
80	April 10	Sacramento	L 103–104	Stephen Curry (27)	David Lee (14)	Stephen Curry (8)	Oracle Arena; 19,596	35–45
81	April 11	@ Denver	L 111–134	Curry, Wright (27)	Louis Amundson (6)	Curry, Lee (5)	Pepsi Center; 19,155	35–46
82	April 13	Portland	W 110–86	Reggie Williams (28)	Ekpe Udoh (8)	Stephen Curry (9)	Oracle Arena; 19,596	36–46

2010–11 season schedule

== Player statistics ==
Legend
GP	Games played	GS	Games started	MPG	Minutes per game
FG%	Field-goal percentage	3P%	3-point field-goal percentage	FT%	Free-throw percentage
RPG	Rebounds per game	APG	Assists per game	SPG	Steals per game
BPG	Blocks per game	PPG	Points per game

=== Season ===
Player	GP	GS	MPG	FG%	3P%	FT%	RPG	APG	SPG	BPG	PPG
Jeff Adrien	20	0	9.0	.417	.0	.529	2.7	0.5	.15	.25	2.5
Louis Amundson	40	7	14.2	.446	.0	.299	3.9	0.4	.33	.65	4.0
Charlie Bell	19	0	9.0	.279	.286	.500	0.9	0.7	.32	.05	1.7
Andris Biedriņš	59	55	23.7	.534	.0	.323	7.2	1.0	.88	.88	5.0
Rodney Carney*	25	1	13.2	.421	.459	.667	1.9	0.4	.40	.20	5.0
Stephen Curry	68	68	33.5	.475	.436	.932	3.7	5.8	1.50	.28	18.3
Monta Ellis	76	76	40.4	.450	.355	.783	3.6	5.7	2.14	.28	24.1
Dan Gadzuric*	28	4	10.6	.420	.000	.357	3.1	0.4	.40	.60	2.8
Acie Law*	40	0	15.8	.467	.200	.759	1.3	1.8	.70	.0	5.1
David Lee	67	67	35.7	.502	.500	.781	9.6	3.2	.96	.40	16.3
Jeremy Lin	24	0	9.0	.382	.000	.667	0.9	1.1	1.13	.38	2.2
Vladimir Radmanović	69	6	16.4	.431	.400	.882	3.0	1.1	.61	.64	5.2
Al Thornton*	16	0	14.6	.534	.000	.833	2.6	0.3	.38	.06	6.4
Ekpe Udoh	52	12	17.1	.446	.0	.685	3.0	0.6	.33	1.37	4.1
Reggie Williams	74	7	20.3	.472	.424	.746	2.7	1.5	.36	.04	9.3
Brandan Wright*	21	1	9.3	.603	.0	.500	2.0	0.2	.10	.50	4.0
Dorell Wright	76	76	38.3	.434	.389	.789	5.3	3.0	1.42	.80	16.5

As of March 31.
* – Stats with the Warriors.

== Records and milestones ==
=== Records ===
- NBA record: Most combined three-pointers in a game; Golden State Warriors franchise record: Most three-pointers in a game. The game between the Golden State Warriors and the Orlando Magic, a 123–120 overtime win by the Warriors, saw a combined 36 three-point shots made in an NBA game. The Warriors also set a franchise record by connecting 21 three-point shots.

=== Milestones ===
On April 6, 2011, Dorell Wright made a Warriors franchise record of 3 pt shots made in a season with 184 in a home win versus the Los Angeles Lakers, beating Jason Richardson with the previous record of 183 in the 2005–06 season.

On April 13, 2011, Wright became the first player in NBA history to have scored more points in his seventh season than all of his first six combined in a win against the Portland Trail Blazers. Wright also ended the season with the most 3-point shots made in the 2010–11 season with 194, as well as the most 3-point field goals attempted with 516, both of which set new Warriors franchise records.

== Transactions ==
=== Trades ===
June 21, 2010	To Golden State Warriors • 2010 44th pick • Cash considerations	To Portland Trail Blazers • 2010 34th pick
June 22, 2010	To Golden State Warriors • (United States) Charlie Bell • (Netherlands) Dan Gadzuric	To Milwaukee Bucks • (United States) Corey Maggette • 2010 44th pick
July 9, 2010	To Golden State Warriors • (United States) David Lee (sign and trade)	To New York Knicks • (United States) Kelenna Azubuike • (United States) Anthony Randolph • (France) Ronny Turiaf • 2012 2nd round-pick
July 13, 2010	To Golden State Warriors • 2011 conditional 2nd round-pick • Trade exception	To New Jersey Nets • (United States) Anthony Morrow (sign and trade)
July 22, 2010	To Golden State Warriors • 2011 2nd round-pick • Trade exception	To Chicago Bulls • (United States) C. J. Watson (sign and trade)
February 23, 2011	To Golden State Warriors • (United States) Troy Murphy • 2012 2nd round-pick	To New Jersey Nets • (Netherlands) Dan Gadzuric • (United States) Brandan Wright

=== Free agency ===
==== Additions ====
Player	Signed	Former team
(United States) Dorell Wright	3-year contract worth $11 million	Miami Heat
(United States) Jeremy Lin	2-year contract	Harvard (Undrafted)
(United States) Rodney Carney		Philadelphia 76ers
(United States) Louis Amundson	2-year contract worth $4.7 million	Phoenix Suns
(United States) Acie Law		Memphis Grizzlies
(United States) Jeff Adrien		Rio Grande Valley Vipers (NBA D-League)
(United States) Al Thornton		Washington Wizards

==== Subtractions ====
Player	Reason left	New team
(United States) Jeff Adrien	Waived	Erie Bayhawks (NBA D-League)
(United States) Rodney Carney	Waived	Miami Heat
(United States) Troy Murphy	Buy-out	Boston Celtics

== Awards ==
Recipient	Award	Week
(United States) Monta Ellis	Western Conference Player of the Week	Dec. 20 – Dec. 26
