= Shawn Marion =

American basketball player (born 1978)

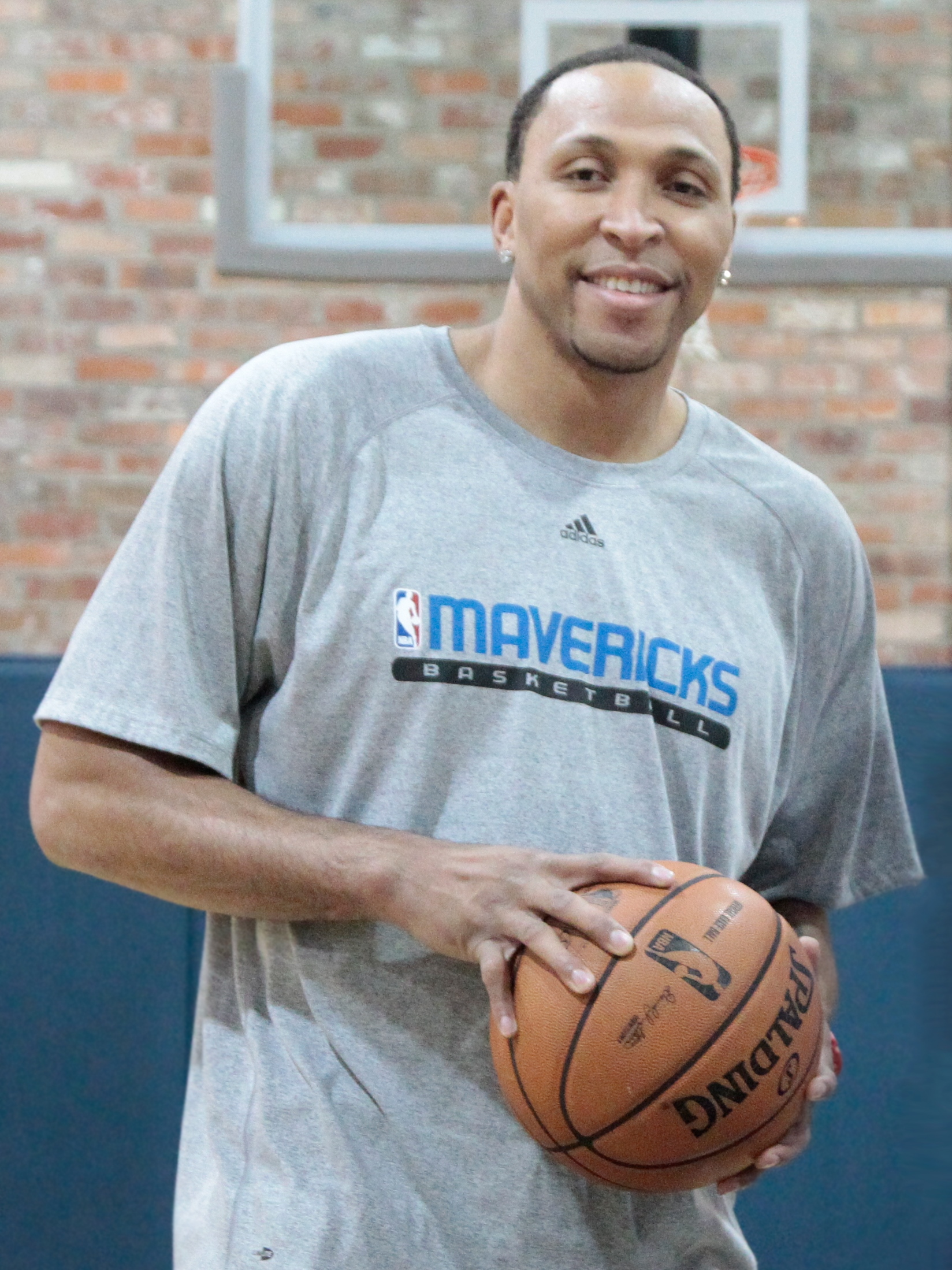
- Marion with the Dallas Mavericks in 2013

Personal information
- Born: May 7, 1978 (age 48) Waukegan, Illinois, U.S.
- Listed height: 6 ft 7 in (2.01 m)
- Listed weight: 228 lb (103 kg)

Career information
- High school: Clarksville (Clarksville, Tennessee)
- College: Vincennes (1996–1998); UNLV (1998–1999)
- NBA draft: 1999: 1st round, 9th overall pick
- Drafted by: Phoenix Suns
- Playing career: 1999–2015
- Position: Small forward / power forward
- Number: 31, 7, 0

Career history
- 1999–2008: Phoenix Suns
- 2008–2009: Miami Heat
- 2009: Toronto Raptors
- 2009–2014: Dallas Mavericks
- 2014–2015: Cleveland Cavaliers

Career highlights
- NBA champion (2011); 4× NBA All-Star (2003, 2005–2007); 2× All-NBA Third Team (2005, 2006); NBA All-Rookie Second Team (2000); No. 31 retired by Phoenix Suns; First-team All-WAC (1999)

Career statistics
- Points: 17,700 (15.2 ppg)
- Rebounds: 10,101 (8.7 rpg)
- Assists: 2,198 (1.9 apg)
- Stats at NBA.com
- Stats at Basketball Reference
Medals
Men's basketball
Representing the United States
Olympic Games
Bronze medal – third place	2004 Athens	Team
Goodwill Games
Gold medal – first place	2001 Brisbane

Shawn Dwayne Marion (born May 7, 1978) is an American former professional basketball player who played 16 seasons in the National Basketball Association (NBA). He finished his career as a four-time NBA All-Star, a two-time member of the All-NBA Team and a one-time NBA champion, helping the Dallas Mavericks win their maiden title in 2011. Nicknamed "The Matrix" by former NBA player Kenny Smith during the preseason of his rookie year, Marion was widely regarded as one of the most versatile players in the league because of his athleticism and ability to play and defend many positions. He was also known for his unorthodox shooting form.

== Early life ==
Marion was born on May 7, 1978, in Waukegan, Illinois, which is about an hour north of Chicago, and played high school basketball in Clarksville, Tennessee, at Clarksville High School, where he was a teammate of fellow future NBA player Trenton Hassell. Marion lettered three years in basketball and earned All-Region and District honors while also being nominated as a McDonald's All-American. As a senior, he averaged 26.4 points and 13.1 rebounds, led his team to the Final 8 of the Tennessee Class AAA State Tournament, earned MVP honors, and was selected to the first-team Tennessee All-State Team. Marion was named as one of the greatest high school basketball players in Tennessee history.

== College career ==
After high school, Marion attended Vincennes University, a junior college in Indiana, for two years. He was a first-team All-American selection as a sophomore and a second-team All-American selection as a freshman.

As a freshman in 1996–97, Marion appeared in 36 games and averaged 23.3 points and 12.8 rebounds (462 total). He shot 56 percent from the field (324-for-516) and 69 percent from the free throw line (124-for-178). Marion's 838 total points as a freshman established him as the second-highest single-season total in school history.

As a sophomore in 1997–98, Marion appeared in 36 games and averaged 23.5 points (847 total points) and 13.1 rebounds (471 total). He shot 60 percent from the field (331-for-549), 38 percent from 3-point range (21-for-56) and 75 percent from the free throw line (122-for-163). Marion was subsequently named the 1998 NJCAA David Rowlands Male Student Athlete of the Year. He averaged 23.4 points (1,685 total points) in his career and is Vincennes University's second all-time leading scorer.

In May 1998, Marion signed a National Letter of Intent to play for UNLV. As a junior at UNLV in 1998–99, Marion averaged 18.7 points, 9.3 rebounds, 2.5 steals and 1.9 blocks in 29 games. He was named to the Western Athletic Conference Mountain Division First Team, All-Newcomer Team and All-Defensive Team.

In March 1999, Marion said his intention was to stay for his senior season, graduate, and try to win an NCAA championship. However, while trying to gauge where he stood with the NBA scouts, Marion learned that he was highly regarded and that he was looking at going no lower than the middle of the first round. As a result, Marion declared for the 1999 NBA draft in April.

== Professional career ==
=== Phoenix Suns (1999–2008) ===
Marion was selected by the Phoenix Suns with the ninth overall pick in the 1999 NBA draft. Due to a left knee injury, he missed 31 games between December and February of the 1999–2000 season. Marion was selected to the NBA All-Rookie Second Team and in 51 games (38 starts), he averaged 10.2 points, 6.5 rebounds, 1.4 assists, 1.0 blocks, 0.8 steals and 24.7 minutes. Marion averaged 17.3 points, 10.7 rebounds, 2.0 assists, 1.7 steals, 1.4 blocks and 36.2 minutes in 78 starts during the 2000–01 season. He played for the Sophomores in the Rookie Challenge during the NBA All-Star Weekend and finished with 18 points, three rebounds, two assists, two steals, and a block in 24 minutes. Marion increased his averages to 19.1 points and 9.9 rebounds in 2001–02, and again in 2002–03 to 21.2 points with 9.5 rebounds. He was named an NBA All-Star for the first time in 2003.

In 2003–04, Marion averaged 19.0 points, 9.3 rebounds, 2.7 assists, 2.1 steals, 1.3 blocks and 40.7 minutes in 79 games (79 starts). He led the NBA in total steals (167) and joined 2003–04 MVP Kevin Garnett as the only two players to rank in the top 30 in scoring (19th), rebounds (14th), steals (2nd), blocks (27th) and minutes (2nd). Following the season, Marion played for the U.S. national team at the 2004 Athens Olympics.

In 2004–05, Marion started all 81 games for the Suns in which he appeared and averaged 19.4 points (.476 FG%, .833 FT%), 11.3 rebounds, 2.01 steals, 1.9 assists, 1.47 blocks and 38.8 minutes. Marion was named Western Conference Player of the Week twice (weeks ending November 28 and December 19), was named a reserve on the Western Conference All-Star Team, and was selected to the All-NBA Third Team. He was the only player in 2004–05 to be ranked in the top 25 in scoring (23rd), rebounding (3rd), steals (4th), blocks (23rd) and minutes (9th). Marion also became only the second player in NBA history (joining David Robinson, 1991–92) to rank in the top five in rebounding and steals in the same season since the league began tracking steals in 1973–74. During NBA All-Star Weekend, he was a member of the Phoenix team that won the Shooting Stars Competition.

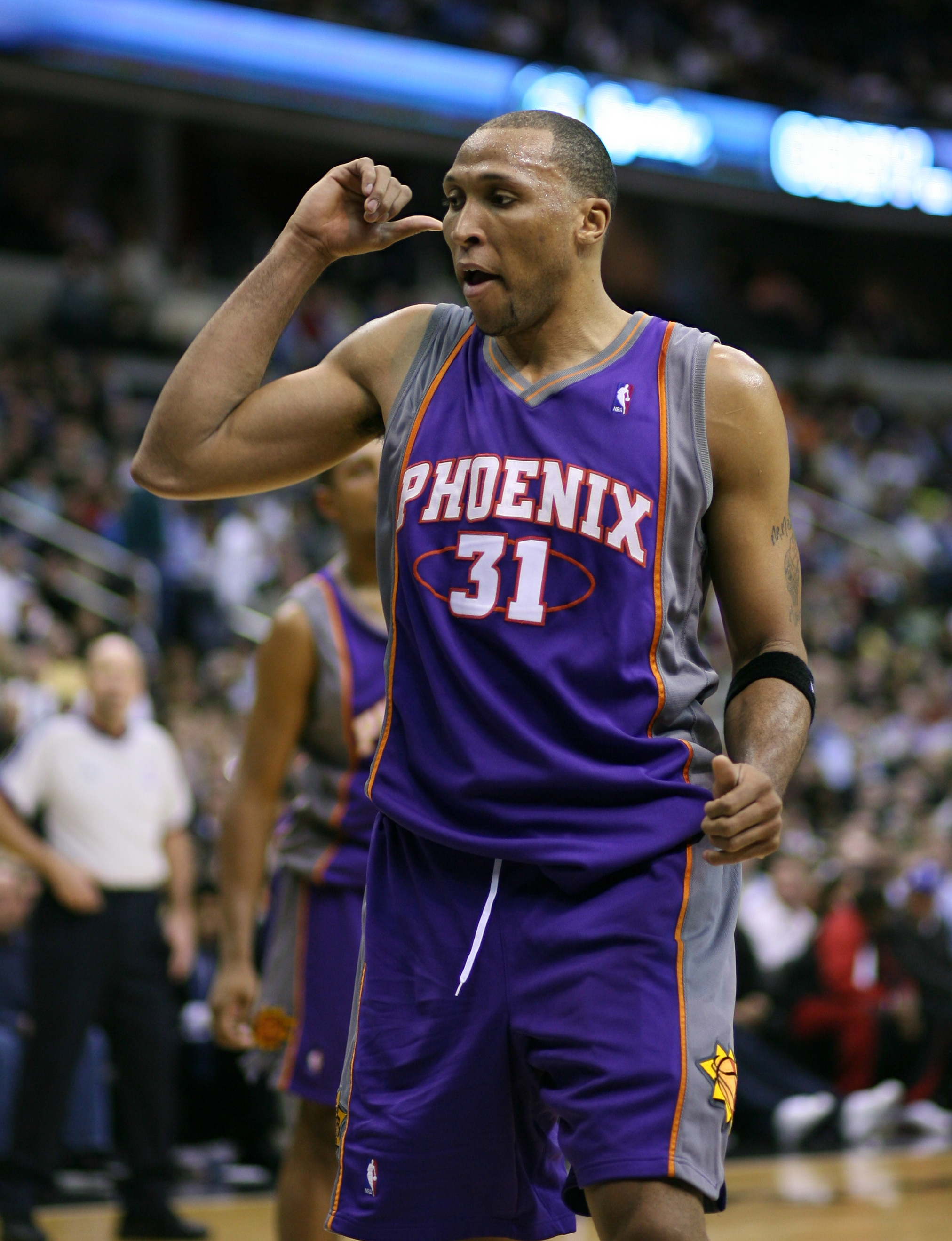
Marion in January 2007

In 2005–06, Marion started each of the 81 games he appeared in for the Suns and averaged 21.8 points (.525 FG%, .809 FT%), 11.8 rebounds, 1.98 steals, 1.8 assists, 1.69 blocks and 40.3 minutes. He was named Western Conference Player of the Month for the month of February, and was named Western Conference Player of the Week for the week ending January 1. Marion was once again named a reserve on the Western Conference All-Star Team and was selected to the All-NBA Third Team for the second consecutive year. He became the first player in NBA history to finish in the top five in both rebounding and steals in consecutive years since the 1973–74 season. Marion was joined by Kevin Garnett, Elton Brand, and Yao Ming as the only players in the NBA to average at least 20 points and 10 rebounds in the 2005–06 season. On February 22, 2006, he scored a career-high 44 points against the Boston Celtics. Marion became only the second Suns player in franchise history (after Charles Barkley) to record three consecutive 30-point/15-rebound games (February 22–27). He also became the first Sun since Barkley to record a 30-point/20-rebound game with 31 points and an NBA season-high (and personal career-high) 24 rebounds against the Charlotte Bobcats on February 25.

In 2006–07, Marion led the NBA in total steals (156) and received seven first place votes and finished fourth in the voting for Defensive Player of the Year. Marion scored his 10,000th career point in the season-opener against the Los Angeles Lakers on October 31, 2006. He was once again named a reserve on the Western Conference All-Star Team.

In September 2007, with trade rumors swirling around him, Marion declared that he wanted out of Phoenix. Marion had been mentioned in trade scenarios involving the Utah Jazz and Los Angeles Lakers. He said he would welcome a trade to the Lakers to play with his good friend Kobe Bryant. During the summer, Marion had reportedly prevented a three-team deal that would have sent him to Boston with an extension, Garnett to Phoenix, and draft picks to Minnesota.

On November 9, 2007, Marion tied his career high with 24 rebounds in a 106–101 victory over the Miami Heat.

=== Miami Heat (2008–2009) ===
On February 6, 2008, Marion was acquired by the Miami Heat, along with Marcus Banks, from the Suns in exchange for Shaquille O'Neal. On March 8, he participated in the first replayed NBA game since 1982, as the Heat played the Atlanta Hawks to settle a disputed last 51.9 seconds from their encounter on December 19, 2007. Marion, who had played for the Suns on December 19 and participated in the replayed 51.9 seconds, officially went down as having played for two different teams on the same day.

=== Toronto Raptors (2009) ===
On February 13, 2009, Marion and Banks were traded to the Toronto Raptors in exchange for Jermaine O'Neal and Jamario Moon. On April 16, Marion scored a season-high 34 points and grabbed 11 rebounds during a 109–98 win over the Bulls, during the last game of the season.

=== Dallas Mavericks (2009–2014) ===
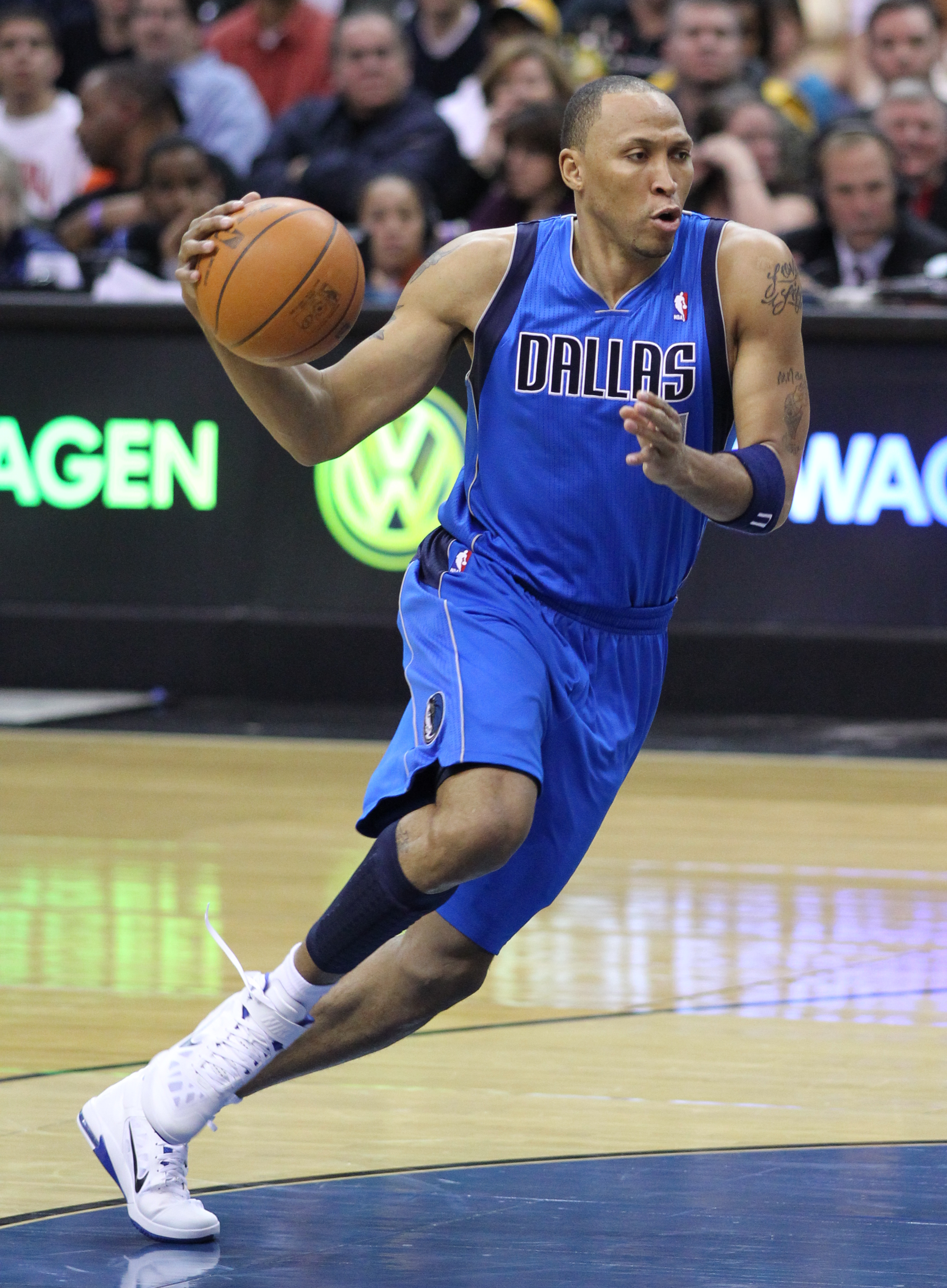
Marion in February 2011

On July 9, 2009, Marion was acquired by the Dallas Mavericks in a sign-and-trade deal with the Raptors, with Marion receiving a five-year contract worth an estimated $39 million. He was a steady performer for the Mavericks during the 2009–10 season, but was not a primary option. Marion's average of 12 points per game was the lowest since his rookie season and he also averaged a career-low 6.4 rebounds per game.

Having been a starter his whole career, Marion was relegated to a bench role for the 2010–11 season, with Caron Butler taking over the starting small forward position. However, Butler sustained a season-ending injury on January 1, 2011, and by the end of the season, Marion was starting again. Marion was the Mavericks' starting small forward throughout their playoff run, a run that resulted in a trip to the NBA Finals. In Game 5 of the Western Conference Finals against the Oklahoma City Thunder, Marion scored 26 points. In the NBA Finals, Marion helped the Mavericks defeat the Miami Heat in six games to win their maiden NBA championship. Marion averaged 13.7 points, 6.3 rebounds and 2.3 assists during the six games, with his best effort coming in Game 2 when he had 20 points. During the season, Marion joined Hakeem Olajuwon, Karl Malone, Kevin Garnett and Julius Erving as the only players with 1,500 steals and 1,000 blocks.

In the lockout-shortened 2011–12 season, Marion was the only player 6 ft 7 in (2.01 m) or shorter to lead his team in rebounding (7.4 rpg, 465 total rebounds). He became the first Maverick 6 ft 7 in (2.01 m) or shorter to lead Dallas in rebounding since 6 ft 7 in (2.01 m) Jay Vincent did so in 1984–85 (8.9 rpg). On March 13, 2012, against the Washington Wizards, Marion moved into 100th place on the NBA's all-time scoring list.

On December 18, 2012, against the Phoenix Suns, Marion eclipsed the 16,000-point plateau, becoming the 95th player in league history with at least 16,000 career points. He joined Hakeem Olajuwon, Karl Malone and Kevin Garnett as the only players in NBA history with at least 16,000 points, 9,000 rebounds, 1,500 steals and 1,000 blocks. On January 27, 2013, against Phoenix, Marion played in his 1,000th NBA game, becoming the 107th player in NBA history to reach the milestone. On March 6 against the Houston Rockets, Marion passed Rod Strickland for 25th place on the NBA's all-time steals list.

On January 3, 2014, against the Los Angeles Clippers, Marion passed the 17,000-point mark and joined Olajuwon, Malone and Garnett as the only players with at least 17,000 points, 9,000 rebounds, 1,500 steals and 1,000 blocks. For the 2013–14 season, Marion posted a career-low 13.4 PER, struggled with consistency on offense, and struggled defensively at times.

=== Cleveland Cavaliers (2014–2015) ===
On September 9, 2014, Marion signed with the Cleveland Cavaliers. In December 2014, he became the first player in NBA history with 15,000 points, 10,000 rebounds, 1,000 blocks and 500 3-pointers.

On January 21, 2015, Marion announced his intention to retire at the end of the 2014–15 season. Marion missed time in February and March with a strained left hip. He returned to the NBA Finals in June 2015, but he did not appear in any of the Cavaliers' six games, a series Cleveland lost 4–2 to the Golden State Warriors.

On June 18, 2015, Marion announced his retirement from the NBA after 16 seasons.

== National team career ==
Marion played for the United States national team at the 2001 Goodwill Games in Brisbane, 2002 FIBA World Championship in Indianapolis, and 2004 Olympic Games in Athens, winning gold in Brisbane and bronze in Athens.

== NBA career statistics ==
Legend
GP	Games played	GS	Games started	MPG	Minutes per game
FG%	Field goal percentage	3P%	3-point field goal percentage	FT%	Free throw percentage
RPG	Rebounds per game	APG	Assists per game	SPG	Steals per game
BPG	Blocks per game	PPG	Points per game	**Bold**	Career high
†	Won an NBA championship

=== Regular season ===
Year	Team	GP	GS	MPG	FG%	3P%	FT%	RPG	APG	SPG	BPG	PPG
1999–00	Phoenix	51	38	24.7	.471	.182	.847	6.5	1.4	.7	1.0	10.2
2000–01	Phoenix	79	79	36.2	.480	.256	.810	10.7	2.0	1.7	1.4	17.3
2001–02	Phoenix	**81**	**81**	38.4	.469	**.393**	.845	9.9	2.0	1.8	1.1	19.1
2002–03	Phoenix	**81**	**81**	**41.6**	.452	.387	**.851**	9.5	2.4	**2.3**	1.2	21.2
2003–04	Phoenix	79	79	40.7	.440	.340	**.851**	9.3	**2.7**	2.1	1.3	19.0
2004–05	Phoenix	**81**	**81**	38.8	.476	.334	.833	11.3	1.9	2.0	1.5	19.4
2005–06	Phoenix	**81**	**81**	40.3	.525	.331	.809	**11.8**	1.8	2.0	**1.7**	**21.8**
2006–07	Phoenix	80	80	37.6	.524	.317	.810	9.8	1.7	2.0	1.5	17.5
2007–08	Phoenix	47	47	36.4	**.526**	.347	.713	9.9	2.1	2.0	1.5	15.8
2007–08	Miami	16	15	37.6	.459	.258	.690	11.2	2.5	1.9	.9	14.3
2008–09	Miami	42	41	36.1	.482	.200	.788	8.7	1.8	1.4	1.1	12.0
2008–09	Toronto	27	27	35.3	.488	.154	.806	8.3	2.3	1.1	.8	14.3
2009–10	Dallas	75	75	31.8	.508	.158	.755	6.4	1.4	.9	.8	12.0
2010–11†	Dallas	80	27	28.2	.520	.152	.768	6.9	1.4	.9	.6	12.5
2011–12	Dallas	63	63	30.5	.446	.294	.796	7.4	2.1	1.1	.6	10.6
2012–13	Dallas	67	67	30.0	.514	.315	.782	7.8	2.4	1.1	.7	12.0
2013–14	Dallas	76	76	31.7	.482	.358	.785	6.5	1.6	1.2	.5	10.4
2014–15	Cleveland	57	24	19.3	.446	.261	.765	3.5	.9	.5	.5	4.8
Career		1,163	1,062	34.5	.484	.331	.810	8.7	1.9	1.5	1.1	15.2
All-Star		4	0	19.5	.575	.000	.500	6.5	3.0	1.5	.5	12.5

=== Playoffs ===
Year	Team	GP	GS	MPG	FG%	3P%	FT%	RPG	APG	SPG	BPG	PPG
2000	Phoenix	9	9	31.2	.419	.167	.818	8.8	.8	.7	1.6	9.1
2001	Phoenix	4	4	34.8	.371	**1.000**	.857	8.3	.8	1.5	1.5	14.8
2003	Phoenix	6	6	**47.0**	.374	.321	.846	11.7	2.0	1.8	**1.8**	18.5
2005	Phoenix	15	15	42.3	.484	.419	.769	**11.8**	1.5	1.4	1.7	17.6
2006	Phoenix	20	20	42.5	.489	.314	.881	11.7	1.6	**1.9**	1.2	**20.4**
2007	Phoenix	11	11	41.4	**.500**	.353	.667	10.4	1.2	1.5	1.7	16.9
2010	Dallas	6	6	24.7	.407	.000	.800	4.2	1.0	.2	.5	8.7
2011†	Dallas	**21**	**21**	32.9	.467	.000	.851	6.3	**2.1**	1.0	.9	11.9
2012	Dallas	4	4	35.0	.425	.286	**.900**	8.0	1.0	.3	1.3	11.8
2014	Dallas	7	7	27.6	.407	.222	.636	5.3	1.9	.9	.1	8.4
2015	Cleveland	6	0	4.2	.167	.000	.000	1.0	.2	.3	.0	.3
Career		109	103	35.2	.456	.318	.814	8.6	1.4	1.2	1.2	13.9

== Personal life ==
Marion and his ex-partner have a son. In 2017, Marion teamed up with fellow retired NBA player Cedric Ceballos to compete in Season 30 of The Amazing Race. They finished in ninth place out of 11 teams.

In February 2018, Marion and fellow former NBA player Matt Walsh became majority shareholders of the New Zealand Breakers via a newly-formed company called Breakers Basketball Ltd.

Marion resides in Dallas.

== See also ==
- List of National Basketball Association career rebounding leaders
- List of National Basketball Association career steals leaders
- List of National Basketball Association career minutes played leaders
