= 2013–14 Dallas Mavericks season =

NBA professional basketball team season

- Head coach: Rick Carlisle
- President: Donnie Nelson
- General manager: Donnie Nelson
- Owner: Mark Cuban
- Arena: American Airlines Center

Results
- Record: 49–33 (.598)
- Place: Division: 4th (Southwest); Conference: 8th (Western)
- Playoff finish: First Round (lost to Spurs 3–4)
- Stats at Basketball Reference

Local media
- Television: FS Southwest; KTXA
- Radio: KESN

The 2013–14 Dallas Mavericks season was the 34th season of the franchise in the National Basketball Association (NBA).

After a one-year absence, the Mavericks led by free agent acquisition Monta Ellis qualified for the playoffs and pushed the eventual champion San Antonio Spurs to seven games in the first round.

== Key dates ==
- May 21, 2013: The NBA draft Lottery took place.
- June 27, 2013: The 2013 NBA draft took place at the Barclays Center in Brooklyn, New York.
- July 1, 2013: The NBA free agency period began.

=== Draft picks ===
Round	Pick	Player	Position	Nationality	College
1	13	Kelly Olynyk	Center	(Canada) Canadian	Gonzaga
2	44	Mike Muscala	Power forward	United States	Bucknell

On Draft night, the Mavs sent Kelly Olynyk to the Celtics in exchange for Lucas Nogueira and 2-second-round picks. The Mavericks subsequently traded Nogueira, Jared Cunningham and Mike Muscala to the Atlanta Hawks for Shane Larkin. They then traded for guard Ricky Ledo with the second-round pick they received from Boston.

== Offseason ==
The Mavericks declined to offer Darren Collison a qualifying offer on June 30, making him an unrestricted free agent.

Israeli point guard Gal Mekel verbally agreed to a 3-year deal with the Mavericks on July 1.

On July 6, the Mavericks reportedly agreed to sign point guard José Calderón to a 4-year, $28 million contract. They then agreed to sign former Maverick Devin Harris to a 3-year, $9 million contract, but it was later scrapped due to Harris' toe injury. The signing of Harris was made official on July 31.

Shooting guard Wayne Ellington reportedly agreed to a 2-year deal worth $5 million with the Mavericks on July 10.

On July 12, the Mavericks have struck a 3-year deal worth at least $25 million with shooting guard Monta Ellis.

Center Samuel Dalembert reportedly agreed to sign with the Mavericks on July 18.

Bernard James and Josh Akognon were waived on July 21 but James was re-signed on July 26 after he cleared waivers.

Nick Calathes was traded to Memphis on July 22 for a 2016 second-round draft pick.

Draft picks Ricky Ledo and Shane Larkin were signed on July 24 and 29 respectively.

On July 25, the Mavericks re-signed forward-center Brandan Wright to a 2-year, $10 million deal.

The Mavericks signed DeJuan Blair officially on August 7.

The preseason schedule was released on August 15.

== Roster ==
2013–14 Dallas Mavericks roster
Players

Pos.	No.	Player	Height	Weight	DOB	From
F/C	45	DeJuan Blair	6 ft 7 in (2.01 m)	270 lb (122 kg)	1989–04–22	Pittsburgh
G	8	José Calderón	6 ft 3 in (1.91 m)	211 lb (96 kg)	1981–09–28	Spain
G/F	25	Vince Carter	6 ft 6 in (1.98 m)	220 lb (100 kg)	1977–01–26	North Carolina
F	9	Jae Crowder	6 ft 6 in (1.98 m)	235 lb (107 kg)	1990–04–06	Marquette
C	1	Samuel Dalembert	6 ft 11 in (2.11 m)	250 lb (113 kg)	1981–05–10	Seton Hall
G	21	Wayne Ellington	6 ft 4 in (1.93 m)	200 lb (91 kg)	1987–11–29	North Carolina
G	11	Monta Ellis	6 ft 3 in (1.91 m)	185 lb (84 kg)	1985–10–26	Lanier HS (MS)
G	20	Devin Harris	6 ft 3 in (1.91 m)	192 lb (87 kg)	1983–02–27	Wisconsin
C	5	Bernard James	6 ft 10 in (2.08 m)	240 lb (109 kg)	1985–02–07	Florida State
G	3	Shane Larkin	5 ft 11 in (1.80 m)	176 lb (80 kg)	1992–10–02	Miami (FL)
G	7	Ricky Ledo	6 ft 7 in (2.01 m)	195 lb (88 kg)	1992–09–10	South Kent HS (CT)
F	0	Shawn Marion	6 ft 7 in (2.01 m)	228 lb (103 kg)	1978–05–07	UNLV
G	33	Gal Mekel	6 ft 3 in (1.91 m)	191 lb (87 kg)	1988–03–04	Wichita State
F	41	Dirk Nowitzki	7 ft 0 in (2.13 m)	245 lb (111 kg)	1978–06–19	Germany
F/C	34	Brandan Wright	6 ft 10 in (2.08 m)	210 lb (95 kg)	1987–10–05	North Carolina

Coaches
Head coach
- Rick Carlisle
Assistant(s)
- Darrell Armstrong
- Tony Brown
- Kaleb Canales
- Monte Mathis

Legend
- (DP) Unsigned draft pick
- (FA) Free agent
- (S) Suspended
- Injured

Roster
Updated: April 9, 2014

== Pre-season ==
2013 pre-season game log
Pre-season: 4–4 (home: 1–3; road: 3–1)

Game	Date	Team	Score	High points	High rebounds	High assists	Location Attendance	Record
1	October 7	New Orleans	L 92–94	Brandan Wright (14)	four players (5)	Monta Ellis (7)	American Airlines Center; 15,082	0–1
2	October 9	@ Memphis	W 95–90	Dirk Nowitzki (20)	Samuel Dalembert (7)	Monta Ellis (8)	FedExForum; 11,459	1–1
3	October 14	Orlando	L 94–102	Dirk Nowitzki (24)	Samuel Dalembert (8)	Gal Mekel (6)	American Airlines Center; 17,136	1–2
4	October 16	@ Indiana	W 92–85	Shawn Marion (18)	Shawn Marion (11)	Monta Ellis (9)	Bankers Life Fieldhouse; 12,735	2–2
5	October 19	@ Charlotte	W 89–83	three players (13)	Shawn Marion (8)	Gal Mekel (6)	Greensboro Coliseum; 7,678	3–2
6	October 21	@ Houston	L 95–100	José Calderón (14)	Samuel Dalembert (7)	Monta Ellis (7)	Toyota Center; 13,380	3–3
7	October 23	Atlanta	W 98–88	Dirk Nowitzki (17)	Samuel Dalembert (11)	Gal Mekel (7)	American Airlines Center; 16,160	4–3
8	October 25	Indiana	L 77–98	Dirk Nowitzki (14)	Samuel Dalembert (9)	Monta Ellis (6)	American Airlines Center; 19,107	4–4

2013–14 season schedule

== Regular season ==
=== Standings ===
Southwest Division	W	L	PCT	GB	Home	Road	Div	GP
z-San Antonio Spurs	62	20	.756	–	32‍–‍9	30‍–‍11	12–4	82
x-Houston Rockets	54	28	.659	8.0	33‍–‍8	21‍–‍20	11–5	82
x-Memphis Grizzlies	50	32	.610	12.0	27‍–‍14	23‍–‍18	4–12	82
x-Dallas Mavericks	49	33	.598	13.0	26‍–‍15	23‍–‍18	9–7	82
New Orleans Pelicans	34	48	.415	28.0	22‍–‍19	12‍–‍29	4–12	82

Western Conference
#	Team	W	L	PCT	GB	GP
1	z-San Antonio Spurs *	62	20	.756	–	82
2	y-Oklahoma City Thunder *	59	23	.720	3.0	82
3	y-Los Angeles Clippers *	57	25	.695	5.0	82
4	x-Houston Rockets	54	28	.659	8.0	82
5	x-Portland Trail Blazers	54	28	.659	8.0	82
6	x-Golden State Warriors	51	31	.622	11.0	82
7	x-Memphis Grizzlies	50	32	.610	12.0	82
8	x-Dallas Mavericks	49	33	.598	13.0	82
9	Phoenix Suns	48	34	.585	14.0	82
10	Minnesota Timberwolves	40	42	.488	22.0	82
11	Denver Nuggets	36	46	.439	26.0	82
12	New Orleans Pelicans	34	48	.415	28.0	82
13	Sacramento Kings	28	54	.341	34.0	82
14	Los Angeles Lakers	27	55	.329	35.0	82
15	Utah Jazz	25	57	.305	37.0	82

=== Game log ===
2013–14 game log
Total: 49–33 (home: 26–15; road: 23–18)
October: 1–0 (home: 1–0; road: 0–0)

Game	Date	Team	Score	High points	High rebounds	High assists	Location Attendance	Record
1	October 30	Atlanta	W 118–109	Monta Ellis (32)	Samuel Dalembert (9)	José Calderón (11)	American Airlines Center; 19,834	1–0

November : 9–8 (home: 7–2; road: 2–6)

Game	Date	Team	Score	High points	High rebounds	High assists	Location Attendance	Record
2	November 1	@ Houston	L 105–113	Dirk Nowitzki (22)	DeJuan Blair; Shawn Marion (10)	José Calderón; Gal Mekel (6)	Toyota Center; 18,142	1–1
3	November 2	Memphis	W 111–99	Dirk Nowitzki (24)	Shawn Marion (14)	José Calderón (5)	American Airlines Center; 20,262	2–1
4	November 5	LA Lakers	W 123–104	Monta Ellis (30)	DeJuan Blair; Dirk Nowitzki (8)	Monta Ellis (9)	American Airlines Center; 19,670	3–1
5	November 6	@ Oklahoma City	L 93–107	Monta Ellis (20)	Samuel Dalembert (9)	four players (3)	Chesapeake Energy Arena; 18,203	3–2
6	November 8	@ Minnesota	L 108–116	Monta Ellis (23)	DeJuan Blair (9)	José Calderón (7)	Target Center; 13,677	3–3
7	November 9	@ Milwaukee	W 91–83	Monta Ellis (18)	DeJuan Blair (11)	Monta Ellis (5)	BMO Harris Bradley Center; 16,448	4–3
8	November 12	Washington	W 105–95	Monta Ellis; Dirk Nowitzki (19)	DeJuan Blair (11)	Monta Ellis (7)	American Airlines Center; 19,627	5–3
9	November 15	@ Miami	L 104–110	Dirk Nowitzki (28)	Samuel Dalembert (9)	DeJuan Blair; José Calderón (5)	American Airlines Arena; 19,772	5–4
10	November 16	@ Orlando	W 108–100	Monta Ellis (19)	Shawn Marion (8)	José Calderón (9)	Amway Center; 15,039	6–4
11	November 18	Philadelphia	W 97–94	Monta Ellis (24)	Samuel Dalembert (14)	Monta Ellis (10)	American Airlines Center; 19,790	7–4
12	November 20	Houston	W 123–120	Monta Ellis (37)	Samuel Dalembert (10)	Monta Ellis (8)	American Airlines Center; 20,045	8–4
13	November 22	Utah	W 103–93	Monta Ellis (26)	Samuel Dalembert (12)	Monta Ellis (6)	American Airlines Center; 19,781	9–4
14	November 23	@ Denver	L 100–102	Dirk Nowitzki (27)	DeJuan Blair (10)	José Calderón (5)	Pepsi Center; 17,841	9–5
15	November 25	Denver	L 96–110	Monta Ellis (22)	Shawn Marion (12)	three players (4)	American Airlines Center; 19,677	9–6
16	November 27	Golden State	W 103–99	Dirk Nowitzki (22)	DeJuan Blair (9)	Monta Ellis (10)	American Airlines Center; 20,211	10–6
17	November 29	@ Atlanta	L 87–88	José Calderón; Dirk Nowitzki (16)	DeJuan Blair (18)	Vince Carter; Monta Ellis (4)	Philips Arena; 15,463	10–7
18	November 30	Minnesota	L 106–112	Monta Ellis (26)	DeJuan Blair (8)	Gal Mekel (7)	American Airlines Center; 20,173	10–8

December : 8–5 (home: 3–2; road: 5–3)

Game	Date	Team	Score	High points	High rebounds	High assists	Location Attendance	Record
19	December 3	Charlotte	W 89–82	Dirk Nowitzki (25)	Shawn Marion (10)	Monta Ellis (5)	American Airlines Center; 19,612	11–8
20	December 4	@ New Orleans	W 100–97	Dirk Nowitzki (21)	Samuel Dalembert; Dirk Nowitzki (7)	Monta Ellis (10)	New Orleans Arena; 14,524	12–8
21	December 7	@ Portland	W 108–106	Dirk Nowitzki (28)	DeJuan Blair (8)	José Calderón; Dirk Nowitzki (7)	Rose Garden; 20,142	13–8
22	December 9	@ Sacramento	L 97–112	Monta Ellis (21)	Jae Crowder (7)	Dirk Nowitzki (7)	Sleep Train Arena; 15,329	13–9
23	December 11	@ Golden State	L 93–95	Monta Ellis; Dirk Nowitzki (21)	DeJuan Blair; Shawn Marion (9)	José Calderón; Monta Ellis (5)	Oracle Arena; 19,596	13–10
24	December 14	Milwaukee	W 106–93	Brandan Wright (19)	Shawn Marion (12)	Vince Carter (9)	American Airlines Center; 19,973	14–10
25	December 18	Memphis	W 105–91	Dirk Nowitzki (20)	Samuel Dalembert; Shawn Marion (7)	Vince Carter (6)	American Airlines Center; 19,425	15–10
26	December 20	Toronto	L 108–109 (OT)	José Calderón (23)	Shawn Marion; Dirk Nowitzki (9)	Monta Ellis (11)	American Airlines Center; 19,406	15–11
27	December 21	@ Phoenix	L 108–123	Dirk Nowitzki (21)	three players (6)	Monta Ellis (9)	US Airways Center; 15,241	15–12
28	December 23	@ Houston	W 111–104	Dirk Nowitzki (31)	Samuel Dalembert (7)	José Calderón; Monta Ellis (5)	Toyota Center; 18,328	16–12
29	December 26	San Antonio	W 116–107	Dirk Nowitzki (25)	DeJuan Blair (11)	Monta Ellis (6)	American Airlines Center; 20,305	16–13
30	December 28	@ Chicago	W 105–83	Monta Ellis (22)	Shawn Marion (13)	José Calderón (7)	United Center; 22,099	17–13
31	December 30	@ Minnesota	W 100–98	Shawn Marion (32)	Samuel Dalembert (7)	Monta Ellis (10)	Target Center; 16,111	18–13

January : 9–8 (home: 5–4; road: 4–4)

Game	Date	Team	Score	High points	High rebounds	High assists	Location Attendance	Record
32	January 1	@ Washington	W 87–78	Monta Ellis (23)	Shawn Marion (9)	Shawn Marion; Dirk Nowitzki (4)	Verizon Center; 15,713	19–13
33	January 3	LA Clippers	L 112–119	Dirk Nowitzki (24)	DeJuan Blair; Shawn Marion (6)	Monta Ellis (9)	American Airlines Center; 20,187	19–14
34	January 5	New York	L 80–92	Dirk Nowitzki (18)	Dirk Nowitzki (9)	José Calderón (6)	American Airlines Center; 19,892	19–15
35	January 7	LA Lakers	W 110–97	Dirk Nowitzki (27)	DeJuan Blair (9)	Monta Ellis (9)	American Airlines Center; 19,656	20–15
36	January 8	@ San Antonio	L 90–112	Monta Ellis (21)	DeJuan Blair (6)	Gal Mekel (5)	AT&T Center; 18,581	20–16
37	January 10	@ New Orleans	W 107–90	Dirk Nowitzki (24)	Samuel Dalembert (8)	Monta Ellis (8)	New Orleans Arena; 16,533	21–16
38	January 11	New Orleans	W 110–107	Dirk Nowitzki (40)	Samuel Dalembert (9)	José Calderón (5)	American Airlines Center; 20,116	22–16
39	January 13	Orlando	W 107–88	Monta Ellis (21)	DeJuan Blair (7)	Gal Mekel (7)	American Airlines Center; 19,695	23–16
40	January 15	@ LA Clippers	L 127–129	Dirk Nowitzki (27)	Dirk Nowitzki (8)	Monta Ellis (13)	Staples Center; 19,695	23–17
41	January 17	@ Phoenix	W 110–107	Monta Ellis (24)	three players (7)	Monta Ellis (7)	US Airways Center; 16,486	24–17
42	January 18	Portland	L 111–127	Dirk Nowitzki (18)	Samuel Dalembert (6)	Shane Larkin (4)	American Airlines Center; 20,375	24–18
43	January 20	@ Cleveland	W 102–97	Monta Ellis (22)	Dirk Nowitzki (10)	Monta Ellis (8)	Quicken Loans Arena; 18,762	25–18
44	January 22	@ Toronto	L 85–93	Monta Ellis (21)	DeJuan Blair; Samuel Dalembert (7)	Monta Ellis (6)	Air Canada Centre; 18,179	25–19
45	January 24	@ Brooklyn	L 106–107	Vince Carter (19)	Shawn Marion (11)	Monta Ellis (7)	Barclays Center; 16,110	25–20
46	January 26	Detroit	W 116–106	Dirk Nowitzki (28)	Dirk Nowitzki (9)	Devin Harris (7)	American Airlines Center; 19,662	26–20
47	January 29	Houston	L 115–117	Dirk Nowitzki (38)	Dirk Nowitzki (17)	José Calderón; Monta Ellis (5)	American Airlines Center; 19,359	26–21
48	January 31	Sacramento	W 107–103	Dirk Nowitzki (34)	Brandan Wright (10)	José Calderón (7)	American Airlines Center; 19,614	27–21

February : 9–3 (home: 3–2; road: 6–1)

Game	Date	Team	Score	High points	High rebounds	High assists	Location Attendance	Record
49	February 3	Cleveland	W 124–107	Dirk Nowitzki (23)	Samuel Dalembert; Dirk Nowitzki (8)	José Calderón (10)	American Airlines Center; 19,595	28–21
50	February 5	@ Memphis	W 110–96	Dirk Nowitzki (26)	Samuel Dalembert (10)	Vince Carter (7)	FedExForum; 16,188	29–21
51	February 7	Utah	W 103–81	Monta Ellis (22)	Vince Carter (8)	José Calderón (7)	American Airlines Center; 19,928	30–21
52	February 9	@ Boston	W 102–91	Dirk Nowitzki (20)	Samuel Dalembert (11)	Devin Harris (7)	TD Garden; 17,650	31–21
53	February 11	@ Charlotte	L 89–114	Monta Ellis; Dirk Nowitzki (16)	Samuel Dalembert (6)	Monta Ellis (7)	Time Warner Cable Arena; 11,467	31–22
54	February 12	@ Indiana	W 81–73	Monta Ellis (23)	Monta Ellis (9)	Monta Ellis (6)	Bankers Life Fieldhouse; 17,663	32–22
All-Star Break
55	February 18	Miami	L 106–117	Dirk Nowitzki (22)	Samuel Dalembert; Dirk Nowitzki (9)	Dirk Nowitzki (7)	American Airlines Center; 20,461	32–23
56	February 21	@ Philadelphia	W 124–112	Dirk Nowitzki (25)	Vince Carter (9)	José Calderón (10)	Wells Fargo Center; 14,928	33–23
57	February 22	@ Detroit	W 113–102	Dirk Nowitzki (24)	Samuel Dalembert; Shawn Marion (11)	Monta Ellis (13)	The Palace of Auburn Hills; 15,213	34–23
58	February 24	@ New York	W 110–108	Vince Carter (23)	Samuel Dalembert (10)	Devin Harris (8)	Madison Square Garden; 19,812	35–23
59	February 26	New Orleans	W 108–89	Monta Ellis (23)	Shawn Marion; Brandan Wright (11)	Monta Ellis (7)	American Airlines Center; 19,729	36–23
60	February 28	Chicago	L 91–100	Monta Ellis (20)	Samuel Dalembert (10)	Monta Ellis (5)	American Airlines Center; 20,398	36–24

March : 8–6 (home: 6–3; road: 2–3)

Game	Date	Team	Score	High points	High rebounds	High assists	Location Attendance	Record
61	March 2	@ San Antonio	L 106–112	Dirk Nowitzki (22)	Samuel Dalembert (10)	Monta Ellis (8)	AT&T Center; 18,581	36–25
62	March 5	@ Denver	L 110–115	Dirk Nowitzki (27)	Dirk Nowitzki (7)	Devin Harris (11)	Pepsi Center; 14,541	36–26
63	March 7	Portland	W 103–98	Dirk Nowitzki (22)	Samuel Dalembert; Monta Ellis (8)	Monta Ellis (7)	American Airlines Center; 20,251	37–26
64	March 9	Indiana	W 105–94	Monta Ellis; Devin Harris (20)	three players (8)	José Calderón (7)	American Airlines Center; 20,361	38–26
65	March 11	@ Golden State	L 85–108	Monta Ellis (15)	DeJuan Blair (8)	José Calderón (5)	Oracle Arena; 19,596	38–27
66	March 12	@ Utah	W 108–101	Dirk Nowitzki (31)	Dirk Nowitzki (8)	Monta Ellis (11)	EnergySolutions Arena; 17,982	39–27
67	March 16	@ Oklahoma City	W 109–86	Shawn Marion (19)	Brandan Wright (8)	José Calderón; Monta Ellis (7)	Chesapeake Energy Arena; 18,203	40–27
68	March 17	Boston	W 94–89	Dirk Nowitzki (19)	Samuel Dalembert; Monta Ellis (7)	José Calderón; Devin Harris (6)	American Airlines Center; 20,132	41–27
69	March 19	Minnesota	L 122–123 (OT)	Dirk Nowitzki (27)	Samuel Dalembert (14)	Shawn Marion (5)	American Airlines Center; 20,100	41–28
70	March 21	Denver	W 122–106	Monta Ellis (26)	Samuel Dalembert (10)	Monta Ellis (7)	American Airlines Center; 20,188	42–28
71	March 23	Brooklyn	L 104–107 (OT)	Monta Ellis (32)	Samuel Dalembert (15)	Devin Harris (6)	American Airlines Center; 19,603	42–29
72	March 25	Oklahoma City	W 128–119 (OT)	Dirk Nowitzki (32)	Dirk Nowitzki (10)	José Calderón (8)	American Airlines Center; 19,607	43–29
73	March 27	LA Clippers	L 103–109	Vince Carter (23)	Samuel Dalembert (11)	Monta Ellis (7)	American Airlines Center; 19,912	43–30
74	March 29	Sacramento	W 103–100	Dirk Nowitzki (19)	Dirk Nowitzki (7)	José Calderón; Dirk Nowitzki (7)	American Airlines Center; 20,210	44–30

April : 5–3 (home: 1–2; road: 4–1)

Game	Date	Team	Score	High points	High rebounds	High assists	Location Attendance	Record
75	April 1	Golden State	L 120–122 (OT)	Dirk Nowitzki (33)	Dirk Nowitzki (11)	José Calderón; Monta Ellis (6)	American Airlines Center; 20,423	44–31
76	April 3	@ LA Clippers	W 113–107	Dirk Nowitzki (26)	Dirk Nowitzki (11)	Monta Ellis (9)	Staples Center; 19,222	45–31
77	April 4	@ LA Lakers	W 107–95	Dirk Nowitzki (27)	Samuel Dalembert (14)	Monta Ellis (9)	Staples Center; 18,997	46–31
78	April 6	@ Sacramento	W 93–91	Monta Ellis (23)	Samuel Dalembert (11)	Devin Harris (7)	Sleep Train Arena; 17,023	47–31
79	April 8	@ Utah	W 95–83	Dirk Nowitzki (21)	three players (6)	Devin Harris (6)	EnergySolutions Arena; 18,102	48–31
80	April 10	San Antonio	L 100–109	Monta Ellis (24)	Samuel Dalembert (11)	Monta Ellis; Devin Harris (4)	American Airlines Center; 20,324	48–32
81	April 12	Phoenix	W 101–98	Monta Ellis (37)	Brandan Wright (11)	Devin Harris (6)	American Airlines Center; 20,413	49–32
82	April 16	@ Memphis	L 105–106 (OT)	Dirk Nowitzki (30)	DeJuan Blair (7)	Devin Harris (10)	FedExForum; 17,323	49–33

2013–14 season schedule

== Playoffs ==
=== Game log ===
2014 playoff game log
Total: 3–4 (home: 2–1; road: 1–3)
First Round: 3–4 (home: 2–1; road: 1–3)

Game	Date	Team	Score	High points	High rebounds	High assists	Location Attendance	Series
1	April 20	@ San Antonio	L 85–90	Devin Harris (19)	Samuel Dalembert; Dirk Nowitzki (8)	Devin Harris (5)	AT&T Center; 18,581	0–1
2	April 23	@ San Antonio	W 113–92	Monta Ellis (21)	DeJuan Blair; Samuel Dalembert (7)	José Calderón; Devin Harris (5)	AT&T Center; 18,581	1–1
3	April 26	San Antonio	W 109–108	Monta Ellis (29)	Samuel Dalembert (10)	José Calderón (9)	American Airlines Center; 20,636	2–1
4	April 28	San Antonio	L 89–93	Monta Ellis (20)	Samuel Dalembert (15)	Vince Carter (5)	American Airlines Center; 20,796	2–2
5	April 30	@ San Antonio	L 103–109	Vince Carter (28)	Dirk Nowitzki (15)	Monta Ellis (6)	AT&T Center; 18,581	2–3
6	May 2	San Antonio	W 113–111	Monta Ellis (29)	DeJuan Blair (14)	José Calderón (6)	American Airlines Center; 20,799	3–3
7	May 4	@ San Antonio	L 96–119	Dirk Nowitzki (22)	Dirk Nowitzki (9)	José Calderón; Vince Carter (4)	AT&T Center; 18,581	3–4

2014 playoff schedule

== Player statistics ==
=== Regular season ===
Player	POS	GP	GS	MP	REB	AST	STL	BLK	PTS	MPG	RPG	APG	SPG	BPG	PPG
Monta Ellis	SG	82	82	3,023	295	471	141	23	1,560	36.9	3.6	5.7	1.7	.3	19.0
José Calderón	PG	81	81	2,468	192	377	69	11	925	30.5	2.4	4.7	.9	.1	11.4
Vince Carter	SG	81	0	1,973	284	212	61	35	967	24.4	3.5	2.6	.8	.4	11.9
Dirk Nowitzki	PF	80	80	2,628	498	216	73	45	1,735	32.9	6.2	2.7	.9	.6	21.7
Samuel Dalembert	C	80	68	1,614	541	38	41	94	529	20.2	6.8	.5	.5	1.2	6.6
DeJuan Blair	PF	78	13	1,214	368	70	60	21	497	15.6	4.7	.9	.8	.3	6.4
Jae Crowder	SF	78	8	1,254	194	60	59	21	356	16.1	2.5	.8	.8	.3	4.6
Shawn Marion	SF	76	76	2,409	497	124	90	37	791	31.7	6.5	1.6	1.2	.5	10.4
Brandan Wright	C	58	0	1,077	244	31	32	55	525	18.6	4.2	.5	.6	.9	9.1
Shane Larkin	PG	48	0	489	42	71	26	1	132	10.2	.9	1.5	.5	.0	2.8
Wayne Ellington	SG	45	1	393	43	19	16	2	145	8.7	1.0	.4	.4	.0	3.2
Devin Harris	PG	40	0	818	85	178	28	2	315	20.5	2.1	4.5	.7	.1	7.9
Gal Mekel	PG	31	1	292	27	63	4	1	73	9.4	.9	2.0	.1	.0	2.4
Bernard James	C	30	0	146	42	3	3	8	28	4.9	1.4	.1	.1	.3	.9
Ricky Ledo	SG	11	0	33	2	2	1	0	19	3.0	.2	.2	.1	.0	1.7

=== Playoffs ===
Player	POS	GP	GS	MP	REB	AST	STL	BLK	PTS	MPG	RPG	APG	SPG	BPG	PPG
Dirk Nowitzki	PF	7	7	263	56	11	6	6	134	37.6	8.0	1.6	.9	.9	19.1
Monta Ellis	SG	7	7	249	17	20	9	1	143	35.6	2.4	2.9	1.3	.1	20.4
Shawn Marion	SF	7	7	193	37	13	6	1	59	27.6	5.3	1.9	.9	.1	8.4
José Calderón	PG	7	7	191	9	31	1	0	72	27.3	1.3	4.4	.1	.0	10.3
Samuel Dalembert	C	7	7	135	59	0	2	10	32	19.3	8.4	.0	.3	1.4	4.6
Vince Carter	SG	7	0	190	25	17	3	2	88	27.1	3.6	2.4	.4	.3	12.6
Devin Harris	PG	7	0	176	17	27	2	2	80	25.1	2.4	3.9	.3	.3	11.4
Jae Crowder	SF	7	0	81	12	2	2	1	19	11.6	1.7	.3	.3	.1	2.7
Brandan Wright	C	6	0	90	12	8	2	6	33	15.0	2.0	1.3	.3	1.0	5.5
DeJuan Blair	PF	6	0	81	37	1	12	0	40	13.5	6.2	.2	2.0	.0	6.7
Wayne Ellington	SG	2	0	14	2	2	0	0	8	7.0	1.0	1.0	.0	.0	4.0
Shane Larkin	PG	2	0	10	1	2	0	0	0	5.0	.5	1.0	.0	.0	.0
Bernard James	C	2	0	8	1	0	1	0	0	4.0	.5	.0	.5	.0	.0

== Transactions ==
=== Trades ===
June 27, 2013	To Dallas Mavericks Draft rights to Shane Larkin (from Hawks)	To Atlanta Hawks Jared Cunningham (from Mavericks); Draft rights to Lucas Nogueira (from Mavericks); Draft rights to Mike Muscala (from Mavericks)
June 27, 2013	To Dallas Mavericks Draft rights to Ricky Ledo (from 76ers)	To Philadelphia 76ers 2014 second-round draft pick (from Mavericks)
July 22, 2013	To Dallas Mavericks 2016 second-round draft pick	To Memphis Grizzlies Nick Calathes

=== Free agents ===
==== Additions ====
Player	Signed	Former Team
DeJuan Blair	Signed 1-year contract worth $1 million	San Antonio Spurs
José Calderón	Signed 4-year contract worth $28 million	Toronto Raptors
Samuel Dalembert	Signed 2-year contract worth $7.5 million	Milwaukee Bucks
Wayne Ellington	Signed 2-year contract worth $5 million	Minnesota Timberwolves
Monta Ellis	Signed 3-year contract worth $25 million	Milwaukee Bucks
Devin Harris	Signed 1-year contract worth $1.3 million	Atlanta Hawks
Gal Mekel	Signed 3-year contract worth $2.3 million	Maccabi Haifa

==== Subtractions ====
Player	Reason Left	New Team
Josh Akognon	Waived	Memphis Grizzlies
Rodrigue Beaubois	Contract ended	
Elton Brand	Signed 1-year contract worth $4 million	Atlanta Hawks
Darren Collison	Signed 2-year contract worth $3.9 million	Los Angeles Clippers
Mike James	Contract ended	Chicago Bulls
Chris Kaman	Signed 1-year contract worth $3.2 million	Los Angeles Lakers
O. J. Mayo	Signed 3-year contract worth $24 million	Milwaukee Bucks
Anthony Morrow	Signed 2-year contract worth $2.2 million	New Orleans Pelicans
