= Monta Ellis =

American basketball player (born 1985)

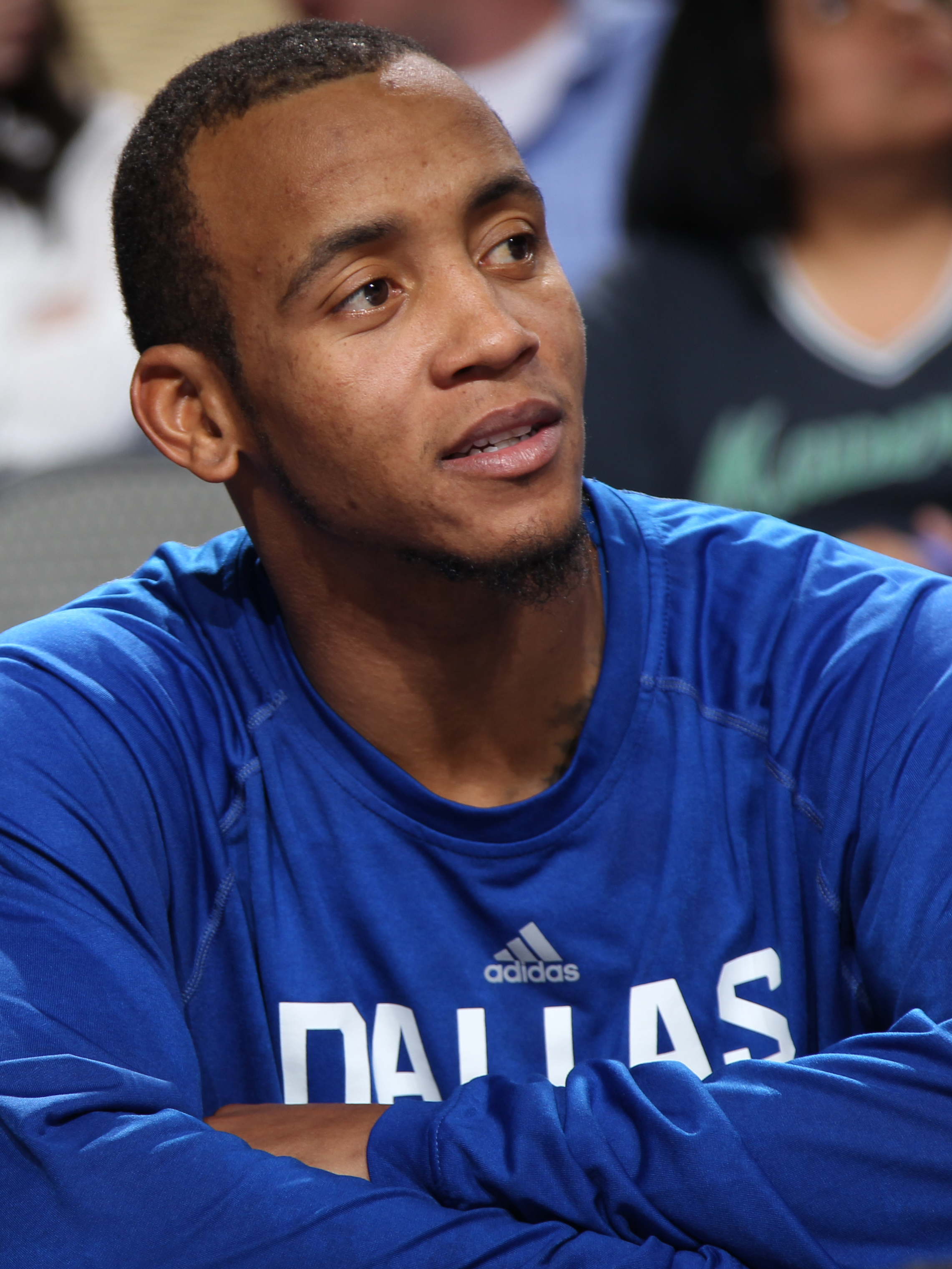
- Ellis with the Dallas Mavericks in 2014

Personal information
- Born: October 26, 1985 (age 41) Jackson, Mississippi, U.S.
- Listed height: 6 ft 3 in (1.91 m)
- Listed weight: 185 lb (84 kg)

Career information
- High school: Lanier (Jackson, Mississippi)
- NBA draft: 2005: 2nd round, 40th overall pick
- Drafted by: Golden State Warriors
- Playing career: 2005–2017
- Position: Shooting guard
- Number: 8, 11

Career history
- 2005–2012: Golden State Warriors
- 2012–2013: Milwaukee Bucks
- 2013–2015: Dallas Mavericks
- 2015–2017: Indiana Pacers

Career highlights
- NBA Most Improved Player (2007); Mr. Basketball USA (2005); McDonald's All-American (2005); First-team Parade All-American (2005); Third-team Parade All-American (2004); Mississippi Mr. Basketball (2005)

Career statistics
- Points: 14,858 (17.8 ppg)
- Rebounds: 2,874 (3.5 rpg)
- Assists: 3,856 (4.6 apg)
- Stats at NBA.com
- Stats at Basketball Reference

Monta Jerome Ellis (/ˈmɒnteɪ/ MON-tay; born October 26, 1985) is an American former professional basketball player. Ellis attended Lanier High School in Jackson, Mississippi, where he was a McDonald's All-American and first-team Parade All-American. He entered the NBA directly out of high school, being drafted with the 40th overall pick by the Golden State Warriors in the 2005 NBA draft. In 2007, he was named the NBA Most Improved Player. During his career Ellis was one of the best scorers in the league, averaging close to 25 points per game on two occasions.

After six and a half seasons with Golden State, he was traded to the Milwaukee Bucks in March 2012; a season and a half with the Bucks was followed by two seasons with the Dallas Mavericks and finally, two seasons with the Indiana Pacers.

== High school career ==
Ellis attended Lanier High School in Jackson, Mississippi. As a senior in 2004–05, at 19 years old, Ellis led Lanier to its second state crown in four years, averaging 38.4 points, 7.9 rebounds, 6.9 assists and 4.5 steals per game for a team that finished 35–2 and No. 3 in the FAB 50 national rankings. During his senior season, Ellis scored 65 points against Greenwood. The schools met again later that season, where Ellis had 72 points, a mark tied for second on the all-time state charts. He also had 46 points against Oak Hill Academy. For his efforts, Ellis was named 2005 EA SPORTS National Player of the Year and Parade co-Player of the Year with Greg Oden. Ellis led Lanier to a 129–16 record in his four seasons as a starter, winning the 4A state championship in both 2002 (33–5) and 2005 and runner-up finishes in 2003 (31–4) and 2004 (30–5). He finished ranked second in state history with 4,167 points, good for 28.7 points per game.

Ellis originally committed to Mississippi State University, but later decided to enter the NBA draft.

== Professional career ==
=== Golden State Warriors (2005–2012) ===
Ellis was selected with the 40th overall pick (second round) in the 2005 NBA draft by the Golden State Warriors. He appeared in 46 games as a rookie and made three starts, with all three coming over the last four games of the season. He averaged 6.8 points, 2.1 rebounds, and 1.6 assists in 18.1 minutes per game. In the Warriors' season finale on April 19, 2006, Ellis scored a season-high 27 points as Golden State lost 105–102 to the Utah Jazz.

Ellis averaged 16.5 points, 4.1 assists, 3.2 rebounds and 1.7 steals in 2006–07, helping the Warriors return to the playoffs after a 12-year absence. Ellis increased his scoring by 9.7 points from his rookie season, the largest increase in the NBA. Starting 53 of the 77 games he appeared in, Ellis reached double figures in scoring 68 times, including 24 games of 20 or more points. He scored a season-high 31 points three times, twice in November and once in March. On February 24, Ellis recorded a career-high 13 assists against the Los Angeles Clippers. He recorded three or more steals 20 times and had at least five steals three times, including a career-high six against the Seattle SuperSonics on March 17, 2007. He was subsequently named the NBA Most Improved Player. In May, he helped the Warriors defeat the Dallas Mavericks in six games in the first round of the playoffs, becoming the first No. 8 seed to capture a best-of-seven playoff series. The Warriors went on to lose in five games to the Utah Jazz in the second round.

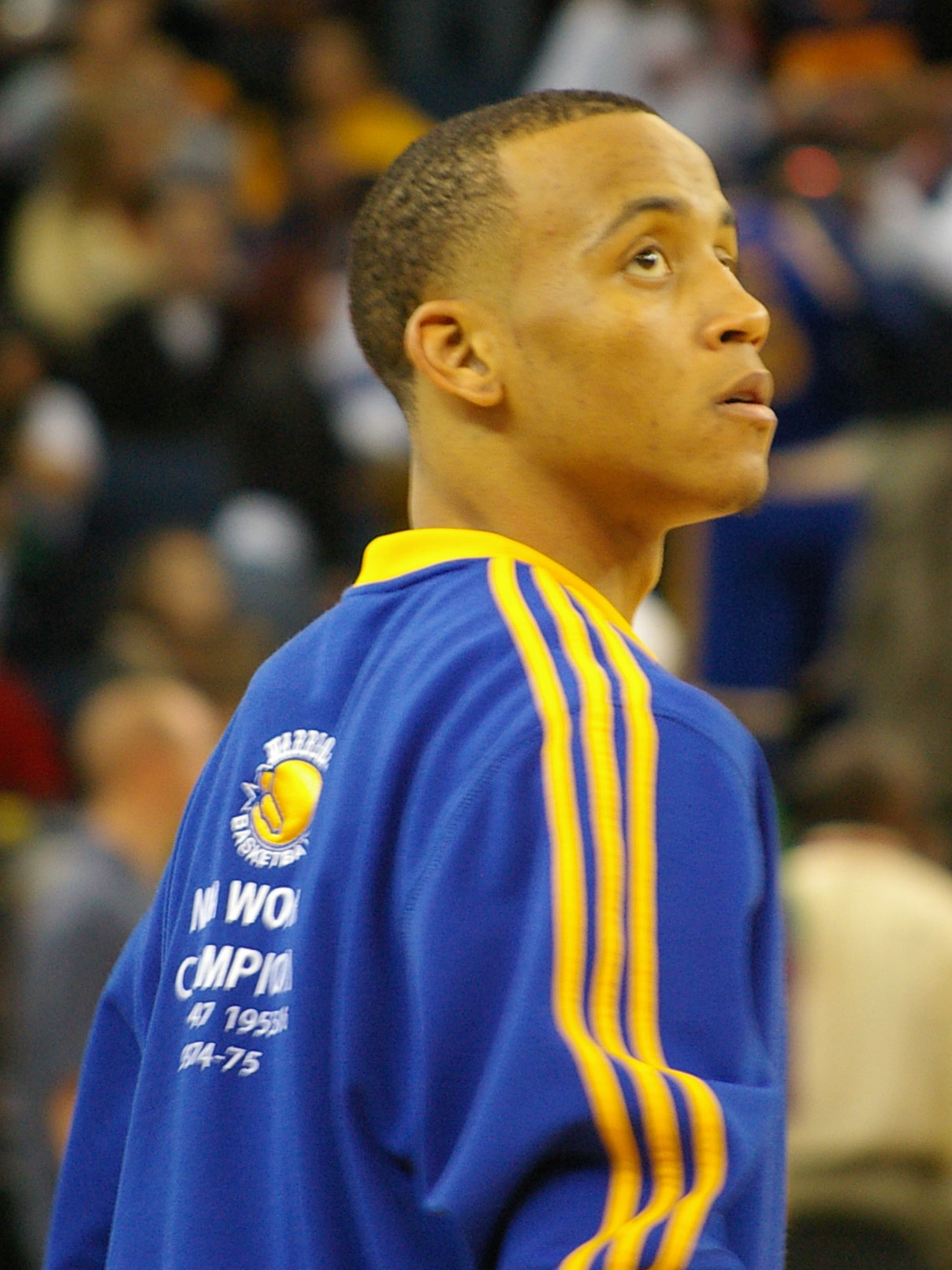
Ellis with the Warriors in April 2008

Ellis averaged a career-high 20.2 points, 5.0 rebounds, 3.4 assists and 1.53 steals in 37.9 minutes in 81 games during the 2007–08 season. He ranked 14th in the NBA in field goal percentage (.531, 3rd among all guards), 15th in steals and 25th in scoring. He became only the ninth guard in NBA history to shoot 60% from the floor for an entire month in February (.602). He scored a career-high 39 points on January 24 against the New Jersey Nets and scored 30-plus points on 12 occasions overall.

On July 24, 2008, Ellis re-signed with the Warriors to a six-year, $66 million contract. However, in August, he was sidelined for three-plus months after suffering a Grade 3 high ankle sprain, a torn deltoid ligament and a syndesmosis disruption of his left ankle that required surgery. The injuries occurred in a motorized scooter accident, but his mistake was compounded by telling the Warriors he hurt himself playing pickup ball in his native Mississippi, only coming clean about the accident several days later. As a result, he was suspended by the Warriors for 30 games without pay—the approximate number of games he was expected to miss with the injury anyway.

Ellis made his season debut on January 23, 2009, scoring 20 points in a 106–105 loss to the Cleveland Cavaliers. On March 11 against the New Jersey Nets, Ellis returned to the line-up after missing seven games to attend to a family emergency. On April 1, he scored a career-high 42 points to go with nine rebounds and nine assists in a 143–141 overtime win over the Sacramento Kings. After jamming his left ankle late in overtime, Ellis missed the final seven games of the season to finish with a total of 57 missed games in 2008–09. In 25 games, he averaged 19.0 points, 4.3 rebounds, 3.7 assists and 1.6 steals per game.

On November 25, 2009, Ellis scored 42 points in a 118–104 loss to the San Antonio Spurs. On November 30, he scored a career-high 45 points in a 126–107 win over the Indiana Pacers. On February 3, he set a new career high with 46 points in a 110–101 loss to the Dallas Mavericks. Between late February and early March, Ellis missed six straight games with a back injury. Then between late March and early April, he missed seven straight games with the flu. Ellis solidified himself as one of the top guards in the NBA and in the process emerged as the team's true leader. His career-best 25.5 points per game was second among Western Conference guards and sixth overall in the NBA and he also ranked among the NBA leaders in steals (2nd, 2.23 spg) and minutes played (1st, 41.4 mpg).

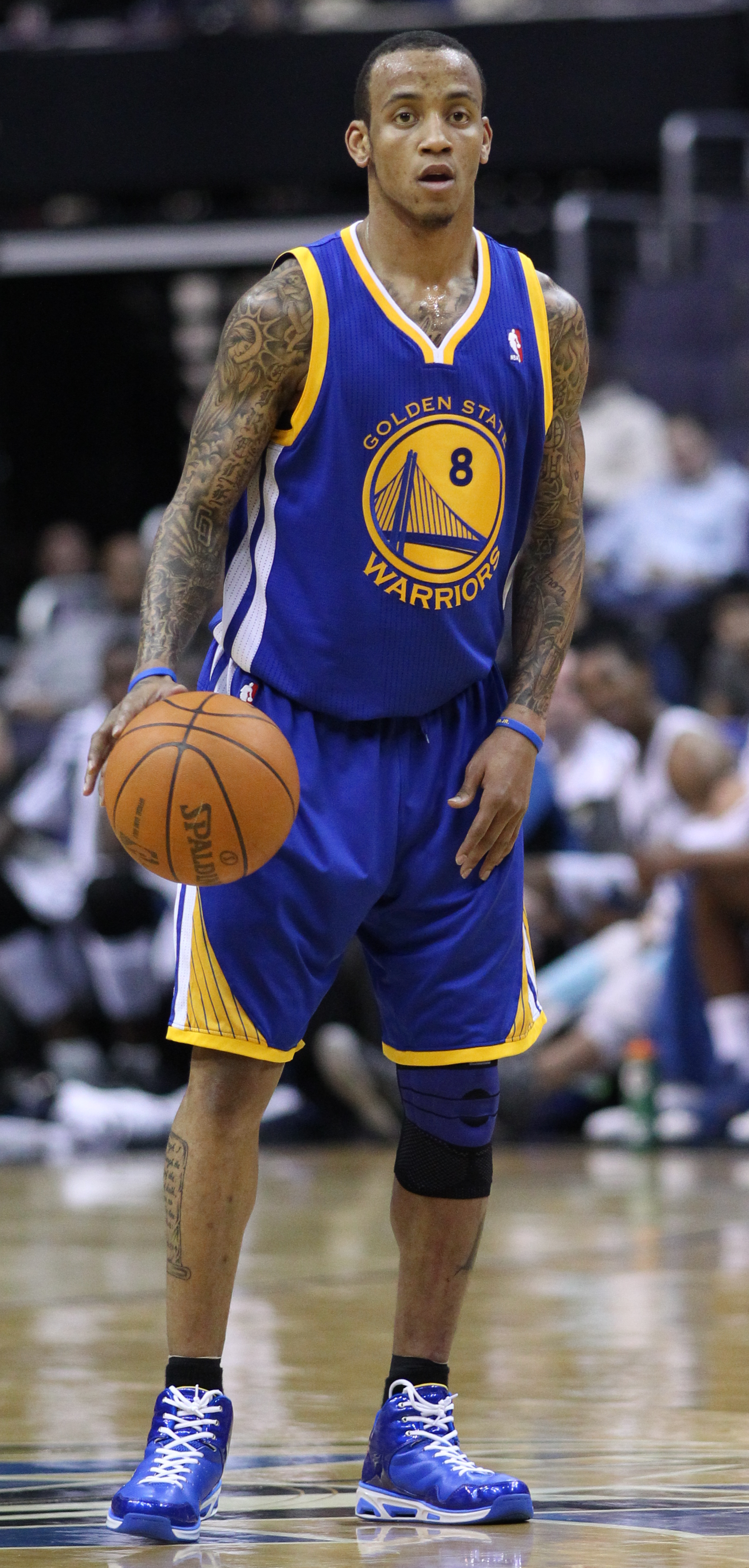
Ellis with the Warriors in March 2011

In the Warriors' season opener on October 27, 2010, Ellis matched his career high with 46 points in a 132–128 win over the Houston Rockets, setting the third-best total by a Warriors player in a season opener. Only Wilt Chamberlain, who had 48 points in 1961 and 56 points in 1962, had more. On December 27, he was named Western Conference Player of the Week for games played Monday, December 20, through Sunday, December 26. On March 4, 2011, he scored 28 of his 41 points in the second half of the Warriors' 107–103 loss to the Boston Celtics. The 2010–11 season saw Ellis and Stephen Curry become one of the most lethal duos in the NBA. For the season, he ranked eighth in scoring (24.1 ppg), first in minutes (40.3 mpg) and third in steals (2.10 spg). Many around the league thought that Ellis was deserving of being an All-Star.

On February 7, he scored a career-high 48 points in a 119–116 loss to the Oklahoma City Thunder. On March 12, he was named Western Conference Player of the Week for games played Monday, March 5, through Sunday, March 11. It was his second career player of the week honor.

=== Milwaukee Bucks (2012–2013) ===
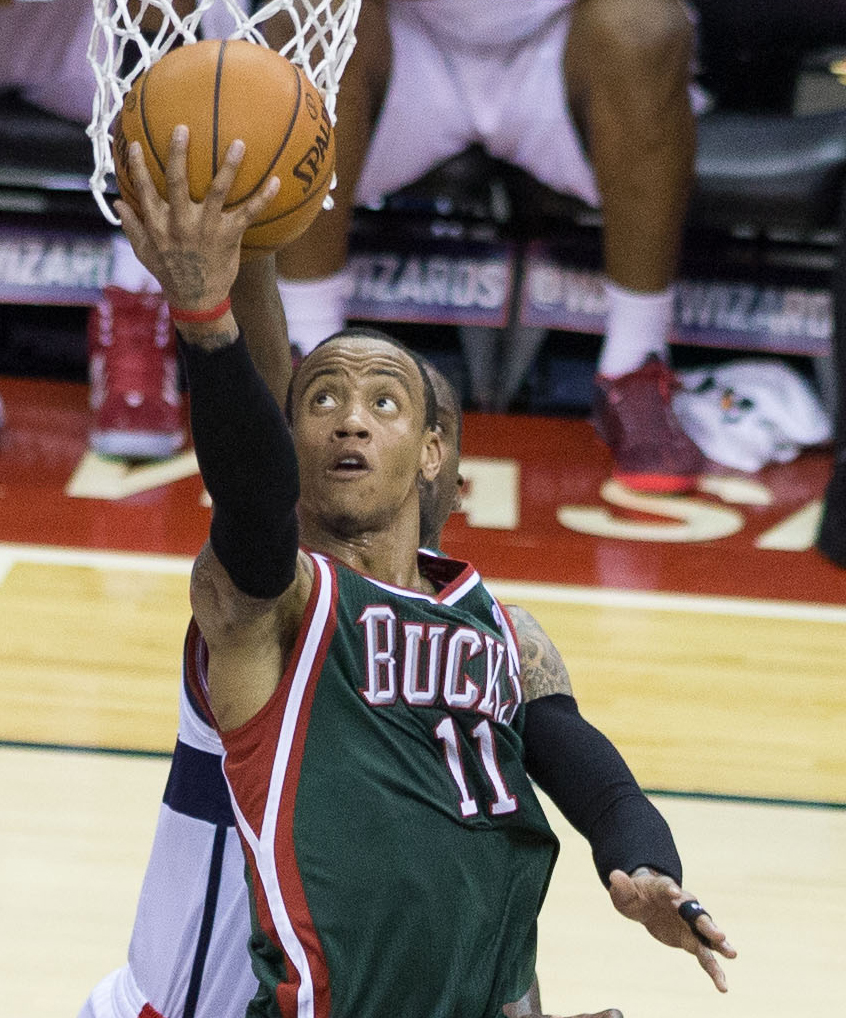
Ellis with the Bucks in March 2013

On March 13, 2012, Ellis was traded, along with Kwame Brown and Ekpe Udoh, to the Milwaukee Bucks in exchange for Andrew Bogut and Stephen Jackson. His debut for the Bucks came on March 16 against the Warriors in Oakland at Oracle Arena, where he recorded 18 points, four rebounds and four assists in a 120–98 win. His best performance for the Bucks in 2011–12 came on April 11, when he recorded 35 points, 10 assists, six rebounds and four steals in a 111–107 loss to the New York Knicks.

The 2012–13 season saw Ellis start in all 82 games for the Bucks. On December 22, he scored 37 points against the Cleveland Cavaliers. On December 31, he was named Eastern Conference Player of the Week for games played Monday, December 24, through Sunday, December 30. On March 4, he was named Eastern Conference Player of the Week for games played Monday, February 25, through Sunday, March 3. On March 17, he scored a season-high 39 points against the Orlando Magic. On April 12, Ellis led Milwaukee with 27 points and a career-high 17 assists in a 109–104 loss to the Atlanta Hawks. On April 15, he scored 38 points against the Denver Nuggets. In his first playoff appearance since 2007 with Golden State, the Bucks were swept by the Miami Heat in the first round. Ellis averaged 19.2 points in 2012–13 but had the lowest 3-point shooting percentage among eligible players at 28.7 percent.

=== Dallas Mavericks (2013–2015) ===
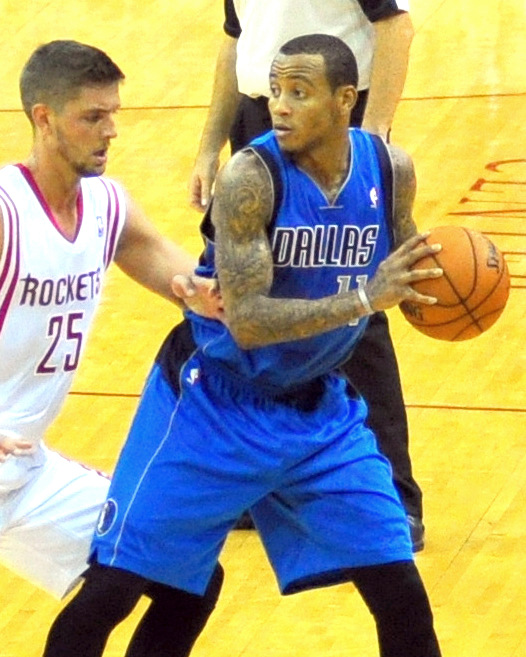
Ellis with the Mavericks in November 2013, being defended by Chandler Parsons.

On July 23, 2013, Ellis signed a three-year, $25 million contract with the Dallas Mavericks. He joined the Mavericks with questions about his efficiency on offense. The 2013–14 season saw Ellis start in all 82 games for the Mavericks. In his debut for the Mavericks on October 30, 2013, Ellis scored 32 points in a 118–109 season-opening win over the Atlanta Hawks. He was 11 of 17 from the field and had eight assists. On November 20, he scored a season-high 37 points in a 123–120 win over the Houston Rockets. On April 12, 2014, he matched his season high with 37 points in a 101–98 win over the Phoenix Suns. He was subsequently named Western Conference Player of the Week for the final week of the season. The eighth-seeded Mavericks pushed their first-round playoff series against the San Antonio Spurs to seven games, but ultimately lost 4–3. Over the seven games, Ellis averaged 20.4 points per game.

On December 2, 2014, Ellis scored 38 points in a 132–129 double-overtime win over the Chicago Bulls. On December 20, Ellis equaled his season high with 38 points, including 11 during the final four minutes, as the Mavericks rallied late to beat the Spurs 99–93. On March 24, 2015, he matched his season high with 38 points in a 101–94 win over the Spurs. For the regular season, Ellis averaged 18.9 points to become the first player other than Dirk Nowitzki to lead the Mavericks in scoring since 1999–2000. In the Mavericks' five-game first-round playoff series loss to the Rockets, Ellis averaged 26.0 points per game, including scoring a playoff career-high 34 points in a 130–128 loss in game three and 31 points in a 121–109 win in game four.

On June 24, 2015, Ellis decided not to pick up the option for the final year of his contract with the Mavericks, thus becoming a free agent. He underwent surgery on his right knee before the start of free agency, with the procedure described as "minor".

=== Indiana Pacers (2015–2017) ===
On July 14, 2015, Ellis signed a four-year, $44 million contract with the Indiana Pacers. He appeared in 81 games in 2015–16, all as a starter, sitting out only the regular-season finale ahead of the playoffs. On January 10, 2016, he had a season-high 13 assists in a 107–103 overtime loss to the Houston Rockets. On January 30, Ellis scored a season-high 32 points and had nine rebounds to lead the Pacers to a 109–105 overtime win over the Denver Nuggets. He finished the regular season averaging 13.8 points on 43 percent shooting, including 31 percent from the 3-point line. Turnover prone, he averaged 2.5 turnovers during the regular season and 2.4 during the playoffs.

In the Pacers' season opener on October 26, 2016, Ellis recorded 19 points, seven rebounds, seven assists and three steals in a 130–121 overtime win over the Dallas Mavericks. He failed to surpass that scoring mark for the rest of the season, scoring 19 points twice in November and again in March. On December 10, he injured his groin in the first half of the Pacers' comeback win over the Portland Trail Blazers. He subsequently missed the next eight games with a strained right groin. Upon returning from injury, he lost his starting spot to Glenn Robinson III. In 74 games, he made 33 starts and averaged 8.5 points, 2.8 rebounds, 3.2 assists, and 1.1 steals in 27.0 minutes per game.

On July 6, 2017, Ellis was waived by the Pacers. He was paid by the Pacers through the 2021–22 season.

== Executive career ==
On August 7, 2026, it was announced that Ellis would serve as the general manager at Alcorn State.

== NBA career statistics ==
Legend
GP	Games played	GS	Games started	MPG	Minutes per game
FG%	Field goal percentage	3P%	3-point field goal percentage	FT%	Free throw percentage
RPG	Rebounds per game	APG	Assists per game	SPG	Steals per game
BPG	Blocks per game	PPG	Points per game	**Bold**	Career high
*	Led the league

=== Regular season ===
Year	Team	GP	GS	MPG	FG%	3P%	FT%	RPG	APG	SPG	BPG	PPG
2005–06	Golden State	49	3	18.1	.415	.341	.712	2.1	1.6	.7	.2	6.8
2006–07	Golden State	77	53	34.3	.475	.273	.763	3.2	4.1	1.7	.3	16.5
2007–08	Golden State	81	72	37.9	**.531**	.231	.767	**5.0**	3.9	1.5	.3	20.2
2008–09	Golden State	25	25	35.7	.451	.308	**.830**	4.3	3.7	1.6	.3	19.0
2009–10	Golden State	64	64	**41.4***	.449	.338	.753	4.0	5.3	**2.2**	.4	**25.5**
2010–11	Golden State	80	80	40.3*	.451	**.361**	.789	3.5	5.6	2.1	.3	24.1
2011–12	Golden State	37	37	36.9	.433	.321	.812	3.4	**6.0**	1.5	.3	21.9
2011–12	Milwaukee	21	21	36.0	.432	.267	.764	3.5	5.9	1.4	.3	17.6
2012–13	Milwaukee	**82***	**82***	37.5	.416	.286	.773	3.9	**6.0**	2.1	.4	19.2
2013–14	Dallas	**82**	**82***	36.9	.451	.330	.788	3.6	5.7	1.7	.3	19.0
2014–15	Dallas	80	80	33.7	.445	.285	.752	2.4	4.1	1.9	.3	18.9
2015–16	Indiana	81	81	33.8	.427	.309	.786	3.3	4.7	1.9	**.5**	13.8
2016–17	Indiana	74	33	27.0	.443	.319	.727	2.8	3.2	1.1	.4	8.5
Career		833	713	34.8	.451	.314	.772	3.5	4.6	1.7	.3	17.8

=== Playoffs ===
Year	Team	GP	GS	MPG	FG%	3P%	FT%	RPG	APG	SPG	BPG	PPG
2007	Golden State	**11**	6	21.6	.390	.111	.821	2.3	.9	.9	.2	8.0
2013	Milwaukee	4	4	38.0	.436	.158	.375	3.3	**5.5**	**2.5**	.3	14.3
2014	Dallas	7	**7**	35.6	.409	.353	**.871**	2.4	2.9	1.3	.1	20.4
2015	Dallas	5	5	**39.4**	**.468**	**.367**	.750	3.2	5.2	2.0	**.6**	**26.0**
2016	Indiana	7	**7**	32.1	.434	.333	.800	**3.9**	4.3	2.1	.0	11.6
2017	Indiana	4	2	18.9	.400	.250	.800	2.0	1.3	.5	.3	5.5
Career		38	31	29.9	.427	.298	.755	2.8	3.0	1.5	.2	13.7

== Personal life ==
Ellis is the son of Marcellus Singleton and Rosa Ellis. His older brother Antwain Ellis was his basketball hero growing up. Ellis and his wife, Juanika, have three children. Ellis is a sneakerhead and an avid fisherman.

== See also ==
- List of National Basketball Association season minutes leaders
