= 2013–14 San Antonio Spurs season =

47th season of the San Antonio Spurs

- NBA champions
- Conference champions
- Division champions
- Head coach: Gregg Popovich
- President: Gregg Popovich
- General manager: R. C. Buford
- Owner: Peter Holt
- Arena: AT&T Center

Results
- Record: 62–20 (.756)
- Place: Division: 1st (Southwest); Conference: 1st (Western)
- Playoff finish: NBA champions (defeated Heat 4–1)
- Stats at Basketball Reference

Local media
- Television: FS Southwest; KENS; KMYS
- Radio: WOAI; KCOR (in Spanish)

The 2013–14 San Antonio Spurs season was the 47th season of the franchise, their 41st in San Antonio and the 38th in the National Basketball Association (NBA). The Spurs entered the season as runner-ups of the 2013 NBA Finals, where they lost to the Miami Heat in seven games, marking the first time the Spurs lost in the NBA Finals. They also entered the season with an NBA-record ten international players.

Emboldened by a 19-game winning streak from late February to early April, including an unbeaten month in March (16–0), the Spurs finished with the best record in the league at 62–20, tied for the third highest win total in franchise history (67 by the 2015–16 Spurs, 63 by the 2005–06 Spurs, and 62 by the 1994–95 Spurs).

In the playoffs, the Spurs defeated the Dallas Mavericks in seven games in the first round, the Portland Trail Blazers in five games in the conference semifinals, and the Oklahoma City Thunder in six games to advance to the NBA Finals for the sixth time in franchise history. This marked the first time that the Spurs had made back-to-back Finals appearances, also against the Miami Heat, whom they lost against in the previous year's NBA Finals. The Spurs avenged their 2013 NBA Finals loss and became NBA champions after defeating Miami in five games, securing their first NBA title since 2006–07, and fifth in the last sixteen seasons. The Spurs outscored the Heat in the series by the largest per game average point differential (14.0) in Finals history. San Antonio's Kawhi Leonard was named the Finals Most Valuable Player (FMVP).

These Spurs were the last former ABA team to win an NBA championship until the Denver Nuggets won their first title in 2023, coincidentally also defeating the Miami Heat in five games that year. The 2014 NBA Finals also marks the Spurs' most recent title to date, as they would reach the Finals again in 2026 but lose to the New York Knicks in five games.

== Pre-season ==
Total: 3–4 (Home: 2–2; Road: 1–2)

2013 pre-season game log
Pre-season: 3–4 (home: 2–2; road: 1–2)

Game	Date	Team	Score	High points	High rebounds	High assists	Location Attendance	Record
1	October 9	CSKA Moscow	W 95–93 (OT)	Ginóbili & Mills (14)	Jeff Ayres (8)	Tony Parker (5)	AT&T Center; 14,903	1–0
2	October 13	Phoenix	L 99–106	Tim Duncan (12)	Courtney Fells (7)	Green, Ginóbili, Ayres (5)	AT&T Center; 16,203	1–1
3	October 14	@ Denver	L 94–98	Leonard & Joseph (13)	Kawhi Leonard (12)	Leonard, Diaw, Splitter (4)	Pepsi Center; 14,671	1–2
4	October 17	@ Atlanta	W 106–104	Tony Parker (17)	Tim Duncan (8)	Tony Parker (5)	Philips Arena; 8,166	2–2
5	October 19	@ Miami	L 96–121	Kawhi Leonard (17)	Aron Baynes (7)	Boris Diaw (5)	American Airlines Arena; 20,080	2–3
6	October 22	Orlando	W 123–101	Patrick Mills (22)	Tim Duncan (7)	Tim Duncan (7)	AT&T Center; 16,326	3–3
7	October 24	Houston	L 92–109	Aron Baynes (16)	Tim Duncan (8)	Patrick Mills (6)	AT&T Center; 16,247	3–4

2013–14 season schedule

== Roster ==
2013–14 San Antonio Spurs roster
Players

Pos.	No.	Player	Height	Weight	DOB	From
C	11	Jeff Ayres	6 ft 10 in (2.08 m)	250 lb (113 kg)	1987-04-29	Arizona State
C	16	Aron Baynes	6 ft 10 in (2.08 m)	260 lb (118 kg)	1986-12-09	Washington State
SG	3	Marco Belinelli	6 ft 5 in (1.96 m)	210 lb (95 kg)	1986-03-25	Italy
PF	15	Matt Bonner	6 ft 10 in (2.08 m)	235 lb (107 kg)	1980-04-05	Florida
SF	23	Austin Daye	6 ft 11 in (2.11 m)	200 lb (91 kg)	1988-06-05	Gonzaga
PF	33	Boris Diaw	6 ft 8 in (2.03 m)	250 lb (113 kg)	1982-04-16	France
PF	21	Tim Duncan	6 ft 11 in (2.11 m)	255 lb (116 kg)	1976-04-25	Wake Forest
SG	20	Manu Ginóbili	6 ft 6 in (1.98 m)	205 lb (93 kg)	1977-07-28	Argentina
SG	4	Danny Green	6 ft 6 in (1.98 m)	210 lb (95 kg)	1987-06-22	North Carolina
SF	7	Damion James	6 ft 7 in (2.01 m)	225 lb (102 kg)	1987-10-07	Texas
PG	5	Cory Joseph	6 ft 3 in (1.91 m)	185 lb (84 kg)	1991-08-20	Texas
SF	2	Kawhi Leonard	6 ft 7 in (2.01 m)	230 lb (104 kg)	1991-06-29	San Diego State
PG	8	Patty Mills	6 ft 0 in (1.83 m)	185 lb (84 kg)	1988-08-11	Saint Mary's
PG	9	Tony Parker	6 ft 2 in (1.88 m)	185 lb (84 kg)	1982-05-17	France
C	22	Tiago Splitter	6 ft 11 in (2.11 m)	245 lb (111 kg)	1985-01-01	Brazil

Coaches
Head coach
- Gregg Popovich
Assistant(s)
- Jim Boylen
- Ime Udoka
- Sean Marks
- Chip Engelland
- Chad Forcier
- Will Sevening (trainer)

Legend
- (DP) Unsigned draft pick
- (FA) Free agent
- (S) Suspended
- Injured

Roster
Updated: April 13, 2014

== Regular season ==
=== Standings ===
Southwest Division	W	L	PCT	GB	Home	Road	Div	GP
z-San Antonio Spurs	62	20	.756	–	32‍–‍9	30‍–‍11	12–4	82
x-Houston Rockets	54	28	.659	8.0	33‍–‍8	21‍–‍20	11–5	82
x-Memphis Grizzlies	50	32	.610	12.0	27‍–‍14	23‍–‍18	4–12	82
x-Dallas Mavericks	49	33	.598	13.0	26‍–‍15	23‍–‍18	9–7	82
New Orleans Pelicans	34	48	.415	28.0	22‍–‍19	12‍–‍29	4–12	82

Western Conference
#	Team	W	L	PCT	GB	GP
1	z-San Antonio Spurs *	62	20	.756	–	82
2	y-Oklahoma City Thunder *	59	23	.720	3.0	82
3	y-Los Angeles Clippers *	57	25	.695	5.0	82
4	x-Houston Rockets	54	28	.659	8.0	82
5	x-Portland Trail Blazers	54	28	.659	8.0	82
6	x-Golden State Warriors	51	31	.622	11.0	82
7	x-Memphis Grizzlies	50	32	.610	12.0	82
8	x-Dallas Mavericks	49	33	.598	13.0	82
9	Phoenix Suns	48	34	.585	14.0	82
10	Minnesota Timberwolves	40	42	.488	22.0	82
11	Denver Nuggets	36	46	.439	26.0	82
12	New Orleans Pelicans	34	48	.415	28.0	82
13	Sacramento Kings	28	54	.341	34.0	82
14	Los Angeles Lakers	27	55	.329	35.0	82
15	Utah Jazz	25	57	.305	37.0	82

=== Game log ===
2013–14 game log
Total: 62–20 (Home: 32–9; Road: 30–11)
October: 1–0 (home: 1–0; road: 0–0)

Game	Date	Team	Score	High points	High rebounds	High assists	Location Attendance	Record
1	October 30	Memphis	W 101–94	Kawhi Leonard, Boris Diaw (14)	Tiago Splitter (8)	Tony Parker (9)	AT&T Center; 18,581	1–0

November: 13–3 (home: 6–1; road: 7–2)

Game	Date	Team	Score	High points	High rebounds	High assists	Location Attendance	Record
2	November 1	@ L.A. Lakers	W 91–85	Tony Parker (24)	Tiago Splitter (14)	Tony Parker (6)	Staples Center; 18,997	2–0
3	November 2	@ Portland	L 105–115	Tim Duncan (24)	Tim Duncan (7)	Tony Parker (9)	Moda Center; 20,028	2–1
4	November 5	@ Denver	W 102–94	Tony Parker (24)	Tim Duncan, Tiago Splitter, Boris Diaw (8)	Tim Duncan (8)	Pepsi Center; 15,721	3–1
5	November 6	Phoenix	W 99–96	Tony Parker (20)	Tiago Splitter (7)	Tony Parker (6)	AT&T Center; 17,870	4–1
6	November 8	Golden State	W 76–74	Tony Parker (18)	Tiago Splitter (8)	Tim Duncan (5)	AT&T Center; 18,581	5–1
7	November 10	@ New York	W 120–89	Danny Green (24)	Tim Duncan, Danny Green (10)	Tony Parker (6)	Madison Square Garden; 19,812	6–1
8	November 11	@ Philadelphia	W 109–85	Danny Green (18)	Kawhi Leonard (9)	Tony Parker (9)	Wells Fargo Center; 12,424	7–1
9	November 13	Washington	W 92–79	Tony Parker (16)	Tiago Splitter (9)	Marco Belinelli (8)	AT&T Center; 18,581	8–1
10	November 15	@ Utah	W 91–82	Tony Parker (22)	Kawhi Leonard, Tim Duncan, Manu Ginóbili (9)	Tony Parker (6)	EnergySolutions Arena; 17,530	9–1
11	November 20	Boston	W 104–93	Tony Parker (19)	Tiago Splitter (10)	Manu Ginóbili (6)	AT&T Center; 18,581	10–1
12	November 22	@ Memphis	W 102–86	Tony Parker (20)	Kawhi Leonard (9)	Manu Ginóbili (7)	FedExForum; 17,109	11–1
13	November 23	Cleveland	W 126–96	Danny Green (17)	Tim Duncan (6)	Tony Parker 7	AT&T Center; 18,581	12–1
14	November 25	New Orleans	W 112–93	Manu Ginóbili (16)	Kawhi Leonard (11)	Tony Parker (7)	AT&T Center; 18,323	13–1
15	November 27	@ Oklahoma City	L 88–94	Tony Parker (16)	Kawhi Leonard (10)	Tony Parker (7)	Chesapeake Energy Arena; 18,203	13–2
16	November 29	@ Orlando	W 109–91	Tim Duncan (19)	Tim Duncan (9)	Manu Ginóbili (5)	Amway Center; 15,159	14–2
17	November 30	Houston	L 106–112	Tony Parker (27)	Tim Duncan (8)	Manu Ginóbili (11)	AT&T Center; 18,581	14–3

December: 11–4 (home: 5–3; road: 6–1)

Game	Date	Team	Score	High points	High rebounds	High assists	Location Attendance	Record
18	December 2	Atlanta	W 102–100	Tim Duncan (23)	Tim Duncan (21)	Tony Parker (7)	AT&T Center; 17,318	15–3
N/A	December 4	@ Minnesota	Game cancelled then rescheduled for April 8, 2014 due to building smoke.					
19	December 7	Indiana	L 100–111	Kawhi Leonard (18)	Tim Duncan (6)	Patty Mills (6)	AT&T Center; 18,581	15–4
20	December 10	@ Toronto	W 116–103	Manu Ginóbili (16)	Kawhi Leonard (7)	Manu Ginóbili (9)	Air Canada Centre; 17,702	16–4
21	December 11	@ Milwaukee	W 109–77	Tim Duncan (21)	Tim Duncan (16)	Tony Parker (5)	BMO Harris Bradley Center; 11,087	17–4
22	December 13	Minnesota	W 117–110	Tony Parker (29)	Tim Duncan (14)	Manu Ginóbili (9)	AT&T Center; 18,581	18–4
23	December 14	@ Utah	W 100–84	Tim Duncan (22)	Tim Duncan (12)	Tony Parker (7)	EnergySolutions Arena; 19,330	19–4
24	December 16	@ L.A. Clippers	L 92–115	Tim Duncan (17)	Tim Duncan (11)	Tony Parker (6)	Staples Center; 19,253	19–5
25	December 18	@ Phoenix	W 108–101	Manu Ginóbili (24)	Tim Duncan (13)	Manu Ginóbili (7)	US Airways Center; 13,661	20–5
26	December 19	@ Golden State	W 104–102	Marco Belinelli (28)	Kawhi Leonard (10)	Boris Diaw (6)	Oracle Arena; 19,596	21–5
27	December 21	Oklahoma City	L 100–113	Tony Parker (23)	Tiago Splitter (11)	Tony Parker (8)	AT&T Center; 18,581	21–6
28	December 23	Toronto	W 112–99	Tony Parker (26)	Tim Duncan (12)	Tony Parker (8)	AT&T Center; 18,581	22–6
29	December 25	Houston	L 98–111	Manu Ginóbili (22)	Tim Duncan (14)	Tim Duncan (5)	AT&T Center; 18,581	22–7
30	December 26	@ Dallas	W 116–107	Tony Parker (23)	Tim Duncan (13)	Boris Diaw (5)	American Airlines Center; 20,305	23–7
31	December 29	Sacramento	W 112–104	Manu Ginóbili (28)	Tim Duncan (13)	Tony Parker, Boris Diaw (7)	AT&T Center; 18,581	24–7
32	December 31	Brooklyn	W 113–92	Tony Parker (18)	Jeff Ayres (8)	Tony Parker (6)	AT&T Center; 17,409	25–7

January: 8–6 (home: 5–4; road: 3–2)

Game	Date	Team	Score	High points	High rebounds	High assists	Location Attendance	Record
33	January 2	New York	L 101–105	Marco Belinelli (32)	Tim Duncan (7)	Manu Ginóbili (12)	AT&T Center; 18,581	25–8
34	January 4	L.A. Clippers	W 116–92	Tiago Splitter (22)	Tim Duncan (11)	Tony Parker (9)	AT&T Center; 18,581	26–8
35	January 7	@ Memphis	W 110–108	Tim Duncan (24)	Tim Duncan (17)	Tony Parker, Manu Ginóbili (6)	FedExForum; 15,916	27–8
36	January 8	Dallas	W 112–90	Tony Parker (25)	Tim Duncan (13)	Tony Parker (7)	AT&T Center; 18,581	28–8
37	January 12	Minnesota	W 104–86	Kawhi Leonard (17)	Tim Duncan (8)	Tony Parker (10	AT&T Center; 18,098	29–8
38	January 13	@ New Orleans	W 101–95	Tony Parker (27)	Tim Duncan (9)	Tony Parker (7)	New Orleans Arena; 15,552	30–8
39	January 15	Utah	W 109–105	Tony Parker (25)	Tim Duncan (8)	Tony Parker (9)	AT&T Center; 17,917	31–8
40	January 17	Portland	L 100–109	Manu Ginóbili (29)	Kawhi Leonard (9)	Manu Ginóbili (5)	AT&T Center; 18,581	31–9
41	January 19	Milwaukee	W 110–82	Patrick Mills (20)	Tim Duncan (13)	Patrick Mills, Manu Ginóbili (7)	AT&T Center; 18,096	32–9
42	January 22	Oklahoma City	L 105–111	Tony Parker (37)	Tim Duncan (13)	Tony Parker, Jeff Ayres (4)	AT&T Center; 18,581	32–10
43	January 24	@ Atlanta	W 105–79	Boris Diaw (21)	Tim Duncan (13)	Tony Parker (7)	Philips Arena; 17,601	33–10
44	January 26	@ Miami	L 101–113	Tim Duncan (23)	Aron Baynes (6)	Tony Parker (7)	American Airlines Arena; 19,683	33–11
45	January 28	@ Houston	L 90–97	Boris Diaw (22)	Tim Duncan (14)	Cory Joseph (5)	Toyota Center; 18,314	33–12
46	January 29	Chicago	L 86–96	Tony Parker (20)	Tim Duncan (12)	Tony Parker (6)	AT&T Center; 18,581	33–13

February: 9–3 (home: 3–0; road: 6–3)

Game	Date	Team	Score	High points	High rebounds	High assists	Location Attendance	Record
47	February 1	Sacramento	W 95–93	Tim Duncan (23)	Tim Duncan (17)	Tony Parker (10)	AT&T Center; 18,581	34–13
48	February 3	@ New Orleans	W 102–95	Tony Parker (32)	Tim Duncan, Danny Green, Tiago Splitter (7)	Tony Parker (9)	New Orleans Arena; 17,086	35–13
49	February 5	@ Washington	W 125–118 (2OT)	Tim Duncan (31)	Tiago Splitter (12)	Tim Duncan, Tony Parker (5)	Verizon Center; 15,791	36–13
50	February 6	@ Brooklyn	L 89–103	Cory Joseph (18)	Danny Green (7)	Danny Green, Cory Joseph (3)	Barclays Center; 17,732	36–14
51	February 8	@ Charlotte	W 104–100	Patrick Mills (32)	Tim Duncan (13)	Tony Parker (5)	Time Warner Cable Arena; 19,084	37–14
52	February 10	@ Detroit	L 100–109	Marco Belinelli (20)	Tim Duncan (8)	Cory Joseph (9)	Palace of Auburn Hills; 13,628	37–15
53	February 12	@ Boston	W 104–92	Tim Duncan (25)	Marco Belinelli (11)	Marco Belinelli (8)	TD Garden; 17,922	38–15
All-Star Break
54	February 18	@ L.A. Clippers	W 113–103	Patrick Mills (25)	Tim Duncan (13)	Tim Duncan (7)	Staples Center; 19,257	39–15
55	February 19	@ Portland	W 111–109	Patrick Mills (29)	Danny Green (7)	Cory Joseph, Manu Ginóbili (4)	Moda Center; 20,057	40–15
56	February 21	@ Phoenix	L 85–106	Danny Green (15)	Matt Bonner (7)	Marco Belinelli (4)	US Airways Center; 18,422	40–16
57	February 26	Detroit	W 120–110	Marco Belinelli (20)	Tim Duncan (9)	Manu Ginóbili (9)	AT&T Center; 18,581	41–16
58	February 28	Charlotte	W 92–82	Tim Duncan (17)	Tim Duncan (16)	Boris Diaw (7)	AT&T Center; 18,581	42–16

March: 16–0 (home: 9–0; road: 7–0)

Game	Date	Team	Score	High points	High rebounds	High assists	Location Attendance	Record
59	March 2	Dallas	W 112–106	Tony Parker (22)	Boris Diaw (10)	Tony Parker, Manu Ginóbili (7)	AT&T Center; 18,581	43–16
60	March 4	@ Cleveland	W 122–101	Danny Green (24)	Tim Duncan (8)	Manu Ginóbili (6)	Quicken Loans Arena; 17,966	44–16
61	March 6	Miami	W 111–87	Tim Duncan (23)	Tim Duncan (11)	Boris Diaw (5)	AT&T Center; 18,581	45–16
62	March 8	Orlando	W 121–112	Tony Parker (30)	Tim Duncan (10)	Tony Parker, Manu Ginóbili (5)	AT&T Center; 18,581	46–16
63	March 11	@ Chicago	W 104–96	Manu Ginóbili (22)	Tim Duncan, Kawhi Leonard (9)	Tony Parker (9)	United Center; 21,634	47–16
64	March 12	Portland	W 103–90	Patty Mills (15)	Tim Duncan (11)	Tony Parker (5)	AT&T Center; 18,581	48–16
65	March 14	L.A. Lakers	W 119–85	Danny Green (15)	Matt Bonner (10)	Cory Joseph (7)	AT&T Center; 18,581	49–16
66	March 16	Utah	W 112–104	Manu Ginóbili (21)	Tiago Splitter (10)	Tony Parker (7)	AT&T Center; 18,242	50–16
67	March 19	@ L.A. Lakers	W 125–109	Tony Parker (25)	Tim Duncan (16)	Tim Duncan, Boris Diaw, Manu Ginóbili (6)	Staples Center; 18,997	51–16
68	March 21	@ Sacramento	W 99–79	Marco Belinelli (17)	Tiago Splitter (11)	Tim Duncan (6)	Sleep Train Arena; 17,317	52–16
69	March 22	@ Golden State	W 99–90	Tony Parker (20)	Tiago Splitter (14)	Boris Diaw, Tony Parker & Patty Mills (5)	Oracle Arena; 19,596	53–16
70	March 24	Philadelphia	W 113–91	Austin Daye (22)	Cory Joseph (7)	Marco Belinelli (8)	AT&T Center; 17,798	54–16
71	March 26	Denver	W 108–103	Tim Duncan (29)	Tim Duncan (13)	Manu Ginóbili (7)	AT&T Center; 17,949	55–16
72	March 28	@ Denver	W 133–102	Marco Belinelli (27)	Tiago Splitter (12)	Tiago Splitter (7)	Pepsi Center; 19,155	56–16
73	March 29	New Orleans	W 96–80	Marco Belinelli (18)	Tim Duncan (8)	Tim Duncan (6)	AT&T Center; 18,581	57–16
74	March 31	@ Indiana	W 103–77	Tony Parker (22)	Kawhi Leonard (11)	Tim Duncan, Tony Parker, Boris Diaw (4)	Bankers Life Fieldhouse; 18,165	58–16

April: 4–4 (home: 3–1; road: 1–3)

Game	Date	Team	Score	High points	High rebounds	High assists	Location Attendance	Record
75	April 2	Golden State	W 111–90	Tony Parker (18)	Tim Duncan (8)	Tony Parker (8)	AT&T Center; 18,581	59–16
76	April 3	@ Oklahoma City	L 94–106	Patty Mills (21)	Tim Duncan (8)	Tony Parker, Kawhi Leonard (3)	Chesapeake Energy Arena; 18,203	59–17
77	April 6	Memphis	W 112–92	Kawhi Leonard, Manu Ginóbili (26)	Patty Mills (6)	Kawhi Leonard, Cory Joseph (5)	AT&T Center; 18,581	60–17
78	April 8	@ Minnesota	L 91–110	Boris Diaw, Cory Joseph (13)	Tim Duncan, Kawhi Leonard (6)	Boris Diaw (5)	Target Center; 10,117	60–18
79	April 10	@ Dallas	W 109–100	Patty Mills (26)	Kawhi Leonard (16)	Manu Ginóbili (7)	American Airlines Center; 20,324	61–18
80	April 11	Phoenix	W 112–104	Danny Green (33)	Jeff Ayres (10)	Boris Diaw (6)	AT&T Center; 18,581	62–18
81	April 14	@ Houston	L 98–104	Marco Belinelli (17)	Damion James, Tim Duncan (9)	Boris Diaw (6)	Toyota Center; 18,406	62–19
82	April 16	L.A. Lakers	L 100–113	Kawhi Leonard (14)	Matt Bonner, Tiago Splitter (8)	Manu Ginóbili (5)	AT&T Center; 18,581	62–20

2013–14 season schedule

== Playoffs ==
=== Game log ===
2014 playoff game log
Total: 16–7 (Home: 11–2; Road: 5–5)
First Round: 4–3 (home: 3–1; road: 1–2)

Game	Date	Team	Score	High points	High rebounds	High assists	Location Attendance	Series
1	April 20	Dallas	W 90–85	Tim Duncan (27)	Tiago Splitter (11)	Tony Parker (6)	AT&T Center; 18,581	1–0
2	April 23	Dallas	L 92–113	Manu Ginóbili (27)	Tim Duncan (7)	Manu Ginóbili (4)	AT&T Center; 18,581	1–1
3	April 26	@ Dallas	L 108–109	Tim Duncan (22)	Tiago Splitter (13)	Tony Parker (6)	American Airlines Center; 20,636	1–2
4	April 28	@ Dallas	W 93–89	Manu Ginóbili (23)	Tiago Splitter, Kawhi Leonard (12)	Manu Ginóbili (5)	American Airlines Center; 20,796	2–2
5	April 30	Dallas	W 109–103	Tony Parker (23)	Tim Duncan, Tiago Splitter (12)	Boris Diaw (6)	AT&T Center; 18,581	3–2
6	May 2	@ Dallas	L 111–113	Tony Parker (22)	Tim Duncan (9)	Tony Parker (6)	American Airlines Center; 20,799	3–3
7	May 4	Dallas	W 119–96	Tony Parker (32)	Tim Duncan (8)	Manu Ginóbili, Boris Diaw (5)	AT&T Center; 18,581	4–3

Conference semifinals: 4–1 (home: 3–0; road: 1–1)

Game	Date	Team	Score	High points	High rebounds	High assists	Location Attendance	Series
1	May 6	Portland	W 116–92	Tony Parker (33)	Tim Duncan (11)	Tony Parker (9)	AT&T Center; 18,581	1–0
2	May 8	Portland	W 114–97	Kawhi Leonard (20)	Tiago Splitter (10)	Tony Parker (10)	AT&T Center; 18,581	2–0
3	May 10	@ Portland	W 118–103	Tony Parker (29)	Kawhi Leonard (10)	Tony Parker (6)	Moda Center; 20,321	3–0
4	May 12	@ Portland	L 92–103	Tony Parker (14)	Tim Duncan (9)	Kawhi Leonard (3)	Moda Center; 20,141	3–1
5	May 14	Portland	W 104–82	Danny Green, Kawhi Leonard (22)	Danny Green (9)	Tiago Splitter (7)	AT&T Center; 18,581	4–1

Conference finals: 4–2 (home: 3–0; road: 1–2)

Game	Date	Team	Score	High points	High rebounds	High assists	Location Attendance	Series
1	May 19	Oklahoma City	W 122–105	Tim Duncan (27)	Tiago Splitter (8)	Tony Parker (12)	AT&T Center; 18,581	1–0
2	May 21	Oklahoma City	W 112–77	Tony Parker (22)	Tim Duncan (12)	Tony Parker (5)	AT&T Center; 18,581	2–0
3	May 25	@ Oklahoma City	L 97–106	Manu Ginóbili (23)	Tim Duncan, Tiago Splitter (8)	Boris Diaw (6)	Chesapeake Energy Arena; 18,203	2–1
4	May 27	@ Oklahoma City	L 92–105	Ginobili & Parker (14)	Boris Diaw (10)	Tim Duncan, Tony Parker (4)	Chesapeake Energy Arena; 18,203	2–2
5	May 29	Oklahoma City	W 117–89	Tim Duncan (22)	Tim Duncan (12)	Manu Ginóbili (6)	AT&T Center; 18,581	3–2
6	May 31	@ Oklahoma City	W 112–107 (OT)	Boris Diaw (26)	Tim Duncan (15)	Manu Ginóbili (5)	Chesapeake Energy Arena; 18,203	4–2

NBA Finals: 4–1 (home: 2–1; road: 2–0)

Game	Date	Team	Score	High points	High rebounds	High assists	Location Attendance	Series
1	June 5	Miami	W 110–95	Tim Duncan (21)	Tim Duncan, Boris Diaw (10)	Manu Ginóbili (11)	AT&T Center; 18,581	1–0
2	June 8	Miami	L 96–98	Tony Parker (21)	Tim Duncan (15)	Tony Parker (7)	AT&T Center; 18,581	1–1
3	June 10	@ Miami	W 111–92	Kawhi Leonard (29)	Tim Duncan (6)	Tony Parker, Patty Mills (4)	American Airlines Arena; 19,900	2–1
4	June 12	@ Miami	W 107–86	Kawhi Leonard (20)	Kawhi Leonard (14)	Boris Diaw (9)	American Airlines Arena; 19,900	3–1
5	June 15	Miami	W 104–87	Kawhi Leonard (22)	Kawhi Leonard (10)	Boris Diaw (6)	AT&T Center; 18,581	4–1

2014 playoff schedule

== Player statistics ==
=== Regular season ===
Player	POS	GP	GS	MP	REB	AST	STL	BLK	PTS	MPG	RPG	APG	SPG	BPG	PPG
Patty Mills	PG	81	2	1,527	169	149	68	9	826	18.9	2.1	1.8	.8	.1	10.2
Marco Belinelli	SF	80	25	2,016	226	179	50	7	911	25.2	2.8	2.2	.6	.1	11.4
Boris Diaw	PF	79	24	1,974	326	222	44	32	717	25.0	4.1	2.8	.6	.4	9.1
Tim Duncan	C	74	74	2,158	721	220	43	139	1,119	29.2	9.7	3.0	.6	1.9	15.1
Jeff Ayres	PF	73	10	952	258	60	13	25	240	13.0	3.5	.8	.2	.3	3.3
Tony Parker	PG	68	68	1,997	155	388	36	9	1,134	29.4	2.3	5.7	.5	.1	16.7
Danny Green	SG	68	59	1,651	229	104	65	61	618	24.3	3.4	1.5	1.0	.9	9.1
Cory Joseph	SG	68	19	936	107	114	35	14	343	13.8	1.6	1.7	.5	.2	5.0
Manu Ginóbili	SG	68	3	1,550	202	293	70	17	838	22.8	3.0	4.3	1.0	.3	12.3
Kawhi Leonard	SF	66	65	1,923	412	133	114	50	844	29.1	6.2	2.0	1.7	.8	12.8
Matt Bonner	PF	61	0	690	130	31	15	11	197	11.3	2.1	.5	.2	.2	3.2
Tiago Splitter	C	59	50	1,271	363	90	29	31	483	21.5	6.2	1.5	.5	.5	8.2
Aron Baynes	C	53	4	491	145	34	2	5	161	9.3	2.7	.6	.0	.1	3.0
Nando de Colo^{†}	SF	26	3	301	45	32	15	3	112	11.6	1.7	1.2	.6	.1	4.3
Austin Daye^{†}	SF	14	1	115	20	6	4	4	58	8.2	1.4	.4	.3	.3	4.1
Shannon Brown^{†}	SG	10	1	103	13	5	1	0	23	10.3	1.3	.5	.1	.0	2.3
Damion James	SF	5	1	50	12	3	0	1	6	10.0	2.4	.6	.0	.2	1.2
Othyus Jeffers^{†}	SG	4	1	34	6	1	0	0	7	8.5	1.5	.3	.0	.0	1.8
Malcolm Thomas^{†}	PF	1	0	15	9	0	0	2	2	15.0	9.0	.0	.0	2.0	2.0

- ^{†} Denotes player spent time with another team in the season. Stats reflect time with the Spurs only.

=== Playoffs ===
Player	POS	GP	GS	MP	REB	AST	STL	BLK	PTS	MPG	RPG	APG	SPG	BPG	PPG
Tim Duncan	C	23	23	752	211	45	7	29	374	32.7	9.2	2.0	.3	1.3	16.3
Kawhi Leonard	SF	23	23	736	155	38	39	14	328	32.0	6.7	1.7	1.7	.6	14.3
Tony Parker	PG	23	23	719	45	111	15	2	400	31.3	2.0	4.8	.7	.1	17.4
Danny Green	SG	23	23	529	69	21	32	17	213	23.0	3.0	.9	1.4	.7	9.3
Tiago Splitter	C	23	18	516	140	46	16	11	173	22.4	6.1	2.0	.7	.5	7.5
Boris Diaw	PF	23	3	604	111	78	14	3	211	26.3	4.8	3.4	.6	.1	9.2
Manu Ginóbili	SG	23	0	586	75	95	36	2	330	25.5	3.3	4.1	1.6	.1	14.3
Marco Belinelli	SF	23	0	356	52	19	3	0	125	15.5	2.3	.8	.1	.0	5.4
Patty Mills	PG	23	0	351	35	33	17	1	168	15.3	1.5	1.4	.7	.0	7.3
Matt Bonner	PF	22	2	136	14	11	2	1	27	6.2	.6	.5	.1	.0	1.2
Cory Joseph	SG	17	0	87	9	9	3	0	48	5.1	.5	.5	.2	.0	2.8
Jeff Ayres	PF	17	0	65	19	5	0	0	17	3.8	1.1	.3	.0	.0	1.0
Aron Baynes	C	14	0	101	31	0	3	0	32	7.2	2.2	.0	.2	.0	2.3
Austin Daye	SF	1	0	6	1	0	0	0	0	6.0	1.0	.0	.0	.0	.0
