= 2013–14 Portland Trail Blazers season =

NBA professional basketball team season

- Head coach: Terry Stotts
- General manager: Neil Olshey
- Owners: Paul Allen
- Arena: Moda Center

Results
- Record: 54–28 (.659)
- Place: Division: 2nd (Northwest); Conference: 5th (Western)
- Playoff finish: Conference semifinals (lost to Spurs 1–4)
- Stats at Basketball Reference

Local media
- Television: CSN Northwest; KGW
- Radio: KPOJ

The 2013–14 Portland Trail Blazers season was the franchise's 44th season in the National Basketball Association (NBA).

Prior to this season, the Rose Garden was renamed as the Moda Center. The season saw the Blazers improve on their mediocre 2012–13 output, finishing with a 54–28 record, and finishing 5th in the West. After a three-year hiatus, the Blazers returned to the playoffs, facing the Houston Rockets, in the first round, their first meeting since 2009. The Blazers defeated the Rockets in six games, thanks to Damian Lillard's series-clinching three pointer in Game 6 at home, winning their first playoff series since 2000. However, their season ended in the next round with a defeat to the eventual NBA champion San Antonio Spurs in five games.

== Key dates ==
- June 27: The 2013 NBA draft took place at Barclays Center in Brooklyn, New York.
- July 1: 2013 NBA free agency began.

== Draft picks ==
Round	Pick	Player	Position	Nationality	College/Club team
1	10	CJ McCollum	PG/SG	United States	Lehigh
2	39	Jeff Withey	C	United States	Kansas
2	40	Grant Jerrett	PF	United States	Arizona
2	45	Marko Todorović	PF/C	Montenegro	FC Barcelona

== Future draft picks ==
=== Credits ===
2016 second-round draft pick from New York

New York's 2016 second-round pick is protected for selections 31–37 (if this pick falls within its protected range and is therefore not conveyed, then New York's obligation to Portland will be extinguished) [July 15, 2012]

=== Debits ===
2014 first-round draft pick to Charlotte

Portland's first-round pick is protected for selections 1–12 in 2014 or 1–12 in 2015 or unprotected in 2016 (Charlotte-Portland, February 24, 2011).

2014 second-round draft pick to Denver

Portland's 2014 second-round pick was traded to Denver (June 24, 2011).

2015 second-round draft pick to Cleveland

Portland's 2015 second-round pick to Cleveland [June 27, 2013]

2016 second-round draft pick to Cleveland

Portland's 2016 second-round pick to Cleveland [June 27, 2013]

2017 second-round draft pick to Houston

Portland's 2017 second-round pick to Houston [July 10, 2013]

== Roster ==
2013–14 Portland Trail Blazers roster
Players

Pos.	No.	Player	Height	Weight	DOB	From
F/C	12	LaMarcus Aldridge	6 ft 11 in (2.11 m)	240 lb (109 kg)	1985–07–19	Texas
G	5	Will Barton	6 ft 6 in (1.98 m)	175 lb (79 kg)	1991–01–06	Memphis
G/F	88	Nicolas Batum	6 ft 8 in (2.03 m)	200 lb (91 kg)	1988–12–14	France
F	18	Víctor Claver	6 ft 9 in (2.06 m)	224 lb (102 kg)	1988–08–30	Spain
G	23	Allen Crabbe	6 ft 6 in (1.98 m)	210 lb (95 kg)	1992–04–04	California
F/C	19	Joel Freeland	6 ft 10 in (2.08 m)	225 lb (102 kg)	1987–02–07	FCOT
C	11	Meyers Leonard	7 ft 1 in (2.16 m)	245 lb (111 kg)	1992–02–27	Illinois
G	0	Damian Lillard	6 ft 3 in (1.91 m)	195 lb (88 kg)	1990–07–15	Weber State
C	42	Robin Lopez	7 ft 0 in (2.13 m)	255 lb (116 kg)	1988–04–01	Stanford
G/F	2	Wesley Matthews	6 ft 5 in (1.96 m)	220 lb (100 kg)	1986–10–14	Marquette
G	3	CJ McCollum	6 ft 4 in (1.93 m)	200 lb (91 kg)	1991–09–19	Lehigh
F	41	Thomas Robinson	6 ft 10 in (2.08 m)	237 lb (108 kg)	1991–03–17	Kansas
G	17	Earl Watson (FA)	6 ft 1 in (1.85 m)	199 lb (90 kg)	1979–06–12	UCLA
G	25	Mo Williams	6 ft 1 in (1.85 m)	195 lb (88 kg)	1982–12–19	Alabama
F	1	Dorell Wright	6 ft 9 in (2.06 m)	205 lb (93 kg)	1985–12–02	South Kent (CT)

Coaches
Head coach
- Terry Stotts
Assistant(s)
- Kim Hughes
- Dale Osbourne
- Nate Tibbetts
- Jay Triano
- David Vanterpool

Legend
- (DP) Unsigned draft pick
- (FA) Free agent
- (S) Suspended
- (DL) On assignment to D-League affiliate
- Injured

Roster
Updated: 2014–03–31

== Pre-season ==
2013 pre-season game log
Total: 5–2 (home: 2–2; road: 3–0)
Pre-season: 5–2 (home: 2–2; road: 3–0)

Game	Date	Team	Score	High points	High rebounds	High assists	Location Attendance	Record
1	October 7	L.A. Clippers	L 81–89	Nicolas Batum (12)	Robin Lopez (10)	Damian Lillard (6)	Moda Center; 12,849	0–1
2	October 9	Phoenix	L 98–104	Damian Lillard (19)	Claver, Aldridge, Robinson (6)	Mo Williams (7)	Moda Center; 12,653	0–2
3	October 11	Utah	W 96–86	Damian Lillard (23)	Robin Lopez (9)	Mo Williams (7)	CenturyLink Arena; 6,268	1–2
4	October 16	@ Utah	W 99–92	Damian Lillard (24)	Robin Lopez (13)	Wesley Matthews (5)	EnergySolutions Arena; 19,127	2–2
5	October 18	@ L.A. Clippers	W 94–84	Damian Lillard (16)	Thomas Robinson (13)	Mo Williams (4)	Staples Center; 14,849	3–2
6	October 20	Sacramento	W 109–105	Damian Lillard (28)	Nicolas Batum (11)	Batum & Williams (5)	Moda Center; 17,357	4–2
7	October 24	@ Golden State	W 90–74	Damian Lillard (21)	Nicolas Batum (15)	Mo Williams (7)	Oracle Arena; 18,307	5–2

2013–14 season schedule

== Regular season ==
=== Season standings ===
Northwest Division	W	L	PCT	GB	Home	Road	Div	GP
y-Oklahoma City Thunder	59	23	.720	–	34‍–‍7	25‍–‍16	11–5	82
x-Portland Trail Blazers	54	28	.659	5.0	31‍–‍10	23‍–‍18	13–3	82
Minnesota Timberwolves	40	42	.488	19.0	24‍–‍17	16‍–‍25	7–9	82
Denver Nuggets	36	46	.439	23.0	22‍–‍19	14‍–‍27	5–11	82
Utah Jazz	25	57	.305	34.0	16‍–‍25	9‍–‍32	4–12	82

Western Conference
#	Team	W	L	PCT	GB	GP
1	z-San Antonio Spurs *	62	20	.756	–	82
2	y-Oklahoma City Thunder *	59	23	.720	3.0	82
3	y-Los Angeles Clippers *	57	25	.695	5.0	82
4	x-Houston Rockets	54	28	.659	8.0	82
5	x-Portland Trail Blazers	54	28	.659	8.0	82
6	x-Golden State Warriors	51	31	.622	11.0	82
7	x-Memphis Grizzlies	50	32	.610	12.0	82
8	x-Dallas Mavericks	49	33	.598	13.0	82
9	Phoenix Suns	48	34	.585	14.0	82
10	Minnesota Timberwolves	40	42	.488	22.0	82
11	Denver Nuggets	36	46	.439	26.0	82
12	New Orleans Pelicans	34	48	.415	28.0	82
13	Sacramento Kings	28	54	.341	34.0	82
14	Los Angeles Lakers	27	55	.329	35.0	82
15	Utah Jazz	25	57	.305	37.0	82

=== Game log ===
2013–14 game log
Total: 54–28 (home: 31–10; road: 23–18)
October: 0–1 (home: 0–0; road: 0–1)

Game	Date	Team	Score	High points	High rebounds	High assists	Location Attendance	Record
1	October 30	@ Phoenix	L 91–104	Damian Lillard (32)	Nicolas Batum (13)	Batum & Matthews (4)	US Airways Center; 17,208	0–1

November : 13–2 (home: 6–1; road: 7–1)

Game	Date	Team	Score	High points	High rebounds	High assists	Location Attendance	Record
2	November 1	@ Denver	W 113–98	LaMarcus Aldridge (25)	Wesley Matthews (12)	Damian Lillard (7)	Pepsi Center; 19,155	1–1
3	November 2	San Antonio	W 115–105	Damian Lillard (25)	Nicolas Batum (12)	Nicolas Batum (11)	Moda Center; 20,028	2–1
4	November 5	Houston	L 101–116	Damian Lillard (22)	Robin Lopez (6)	Mo Williams (7)	Moda Center; 17,491	2–2
5	November 8	Sacramento	W 104–91	Damian Lillard (22)	Damian Lillard (8)	Nicolas Batum (8)	Moda Center; 17,627	3–2
6	November 9	@ Sacramento	W 96–85	LaMarcus Aldridge (22)	LaMarcus Aldridge (14)	Damian Lillard (6)	Sleep Train Arena; 15,482	4–2
7	November 11	Detroit	W 109–103	Damian Lillard (25)	LaMarcus Aldridge (12)	Nicolas Batum (8)	Moda Center; 18,834	5–2
8	November 13	Phoenix	W 90–89	Thomas Robinson (15)	Robin Lopez (15)	Damian Lillard (8)	Moda Center; 19,537	6–2
9	November 15	@ Boston	W 109–96	LaMarcus Aldridge (27)	LaMarcus Aldridge (12)	Mo Williams (8)	TD Garden; 18,624	7–2
10	November 17	@ Toronto	W 118–110 (OT)	Aldridge & Lillard (25)	LaMarcus Aldridge (11)	Damian Lillard (8)	Air Canada Centre; 17,945	8–2
11	November 18	@ Brooklyn	W 108–98	LaMarcus Aldridge (27)	LaMarcus Aldridge (8)	Damian Lillard (9)	Barclays Center; 17,732	9–2
12	November 20	@ Milwaukee	W 91–82	LaMarcus Aldridge (21)	Batum & Lopez (8)	Nicolas Batum (8)	BMO Harris Bradley Center; 11,789	10–2
13	November 22	Chicago	W 98–95	Wesley Matthews (28)	Robin Lopez (16)	Damian Lillard (6)	Moda Center; 20,618	11–2
14	November 23	@ Golden State	W 113–101	LaMarcus Aldridge (30)	LaMarcus Aldridge (21)	Damian Lillard (9)	Oracle Arena; 19,596	12–2
15	November 25	New York	W 102–91	Batum & Lillard (23)	LaMarcus Aldridge (14)	Batum & Lillard (6)	Moda Center; 19,939	13–2
16	November 27	@ Phoenix	L 106–120	LaMarcus Aldridge (24)	Robin Lopez (10)	Nicolas Batum (5)	US Airways Center; 12,731	13–3

December : 12–4 (home: 6–2; road: 6–2)

Game	Date	Team	Score	High points	High rebounds	High assists	Location Attendance	Record
17	December 1	@ L.A. Lakers	W 114–108	LaMarcus Aldridge (27)	Robin Lopez (12)	Batum & Lillard (9)	Staples Center; 18,997	14–3
18	December 2	Indiana	W 106–102	LaMarcus Aldridge (28)	LaMarcus Aldridge (10)	Aldridge, Batum, & Matthews (3)	Moda Center; 19,023	15–3
19	December 4	Oklahoma City	W 111–104	LaMarcus Aldridge (38)	LaMarcus Aldridge (13)	Lillard & Williams (6)	Moda Center; 18,950	16–3
20	December 6	Utah	W 130–98	Wesley Matthews (24)	LaMarcus Aldridge (15)	Damian Lillard (6)	Moda Center; 19,833	17–3
21	December 7	Dallas	L 106–108	Damian Lillard (32)	Robin Lopez (14)	Nicolas Batum (6)	Moda Center; 20,142	17–4
22	December 9	@ Utah	W 105–94	LaMarcus Aldridge (24)	Robin Lopez (11)	Nicolas Batum (11)	EnergySolutions Arena; 17,555	18–4
23	December 12	Houston	W 111–104	LaMarcus Aldridge (31)	LaMarcus Aldridge (25)	Batum & Lillard (6)	Moda Center; 19,997	19–4
24	December 14	@ Philadelphia	W 139–105	LaMarcus Aldridge (20)	LaMarcus Aldridge (16)	Nicolas Batum (9)	Wells Fargo Center; 10,189	20–4
25	December 15	@ Detroit	W 111–109 (OT)	LaMarcus Aldridge (27)	Robin Lopez (13)	Damian Lillard (7)	Palace of Auburn Hills; 13,003	21–4
26	December 17	@ Cleveland	W 119–116	Damian Lillard (36)	LaMarcus Aldridge (15)	Damian Lillard (10)	Quicken Loans Arena; 15,689	22–4
27	December 18	@ Minnesota	L 109–120	Damian Lillard (36)	LaMarcus Aldridge (14)	Lillard & Williams (6)	Target Center; 13,776	22–5
28	December 21	New Orleans	W 110–107	Damian Lillard (29)	Aldridge & Batum (8)	Nicolas Batum (7)	Moda Center; 20,027	23–5
29	December 26	L.A. Clippers	W 116–112 (OT)	LaMarcus Aldridge (32)	Robin Lopez (15)	Mo Williams (8)	Moda Center; 20,053	24–5
30	December 28	Miami	L 107–108	Wesley Matthews (23)	Joel Freeland (12)	Batum & Williams (9)	Moda Center; 20,071	24–6
31	December 30	@ New Orleans	L 108–110	Damian Lillard (29)	LaMarcus Aldridge (8)	Nicolas Batum (6)	New Orleans Arena; 17,035	24–7
32	December 31	@ Oklahoma City	W 98–94	LaMarcus Aldridge (25)	LaMarcus Aldridge (14)	Damian Lillard (11)	Chesapeake Energy Arena; 18,203	25–7

January : 8–6 (home: 6–2; road: 2–4)

Game	Date	Team	Score	High points	High rebounds	High assists	Location Attendance	Record
33	January 2	Charlotte	W 134–104	Wesley Matthews (25)	LaMarcus Aldridge (15)	Mo Williams (10)	Moda Center; 20,014	26–7
34	January 4	Philadelphia	L 99–101	LaMarcus Aldridge (29)	Robin Lopez (15)	Nicolas Batum (10)	Moda Center; 20,004	26–8
35	January 7	@ Sacramento	L 119–123	Damian Lillard (41)	Nicolas Batum (11)	Mo Williams (6)	Sleep Train Arena; 15,518	26–9
36	January 8	Orlando	W 110–94	LaMarcus Aldridge (36)	Nicolas Batum (10)	Nicolas Batum (14)	Moda Center; 18,949	27–9
37	January 11	Boston	W 112–104	LaMarcus Aldridge (21)	Aldridge & Lopez (13)	Nicolas Batum (7)	Moda Center; 20,011	28–9
38	January 15	Cleveland	W 108–96	LaMarcus Aldridge (32)	LaMarcus Aldridge (18)	Mo Williams (7)	Moda Center; 19,998	29–9
39	January 17	@ San Antonio	W 109–100	LaMarcus Aldridge (26)	LaMarcus Aldridge (13)	Damian Lillard (8)	AT&T Center; 18,581	30–9
40	January 18	@ Dallas	W 127–111	LaMarcus Aldridge (30)	Aldridge & Lopez (12)	Damian Lillard (10)	American Airlines Center; 20,375	31–9
41	January 20	@ Houston	L 113–126	LaMarcus Aldridge (27)	LaMarcus Aldridge (20)	Nicolas Batum (7)	Toyota Center; 18,135	31–10
42	January 21	@ Oklahoma City	L 97–105	LaMarcus Aldridge (29)	LaMarcus Aldridge (17)	Mo Williams (9)	Chesapeake Energy Arena; 18,203	31–11
43	January 23	Denver	W 110–105	LaMarcus Aldridge (44)	LaMarcus Aldridge (13)	Nicolas Batum (10)	Moda Center; 20,066	32–11
44	January 25	Minnesota	W 115–104	LaMarcus Aldridge (21)	Robin Lopez (10)	Mo Williams (6)	Moda Center; 20,006	33–11
45	January 26	@ Golden State	L 88–103	Wesley Matthews (21)	Aldridge & Robinson	Damian Lillard (4)	Oracle Arena; 19,596	33–12
46	January 28	Memphis	L 81–98	LaMarcus Aldridge (27)	LaMarcus Aldridge (16)	Wesley Matthews (5)	Moda Center; 19,385	33–13

February : 7–5 (home: 4–2; road: 3–3)

Game	Date	Team	Score	High points	High rebounds	High assists	Location Attendance	Record
47	February 1	Toronto	W 106–103	LaMarcus Aldridge (27)	LaMarcus Aldridge (15)	Damian Lillard (7)	Moda Center; 19,996	34–13
48	February 3	@ Washington	L 90–100	Damian Lillard (25)	LaMarcus Aldridge (10)	Damian Lillard (8)	Verizon Center; 13,259	34–14
49	February 5	@ New York	W 94–90	Nicolas Batum (20)	LaMarcus Aldridge (12)	LaMarcus Aldridge (5)	Madison Square Garden; 19,812	35–14
50	February 7	@ Indiana	L 113–118 (OT)	Damian Lillard (38)	Robin Lopez (14)	Damian Lillard (11)	Bankers Life Fieldhouse; 18,165	35–15
51	February 8	@ Minnesota	W 117–110	LaMarcus Aldridge (26)	Robin Lopez (11)	Wesley Matthews (6)	Target Center; 17,506	36–15
52	February 11	Oklahoma City	L 95–98	Nicolas Batum (18)	Robin Lopez (14)	Damian Lillard (7)	Moda Center; 20,018	36–16
53	February 12	@ L.A. Clippers	L 117–122	LaMarcus Aldridge (25)	Nicolas Batum (7)	Nicolas Batum (7)	Staples Center; 19,175	36–17
All-Star Break
54	February 19	San Antonio	L 109–111	Damian Lillard (31)	Robin Lopez (14)	Damian Lillard (6)	Moda Center; 20,057	36–18
55	February 21	Utah	W 102–94	Damian Lillard (28)	Robin Lopez (18)	Damian Lillard (7)	Moda Center; 19,998	37–18
56	February 23	Minnesota	W 108–97	Damian Lillard (32)	Thomas Robinson (18)	Damian Lillard (5)	Moda Center; 19,458	38–18
57	February 25	@ Denver	W 100–95	Damian Lillard (31)	Robin Lopez (10)	Damian Lillard (9)	Pepsi Center; 16,058	39–18
58	February 26	Brooklyn	W 124–80	Mo Williams (21)	Will Barton (11)	Mo Williams (7)	Moda Center; 20,015	40–18

March : 8–9 (home: 5–2; road: 3–7)

Game	Date	Team	Score	High points	High rebounds	High assists	Location Attendance	Record
59	March 1	Denver	W 102–96	Robin Lopez (18)	Nicolas Batum (16)	Nicolas Batum (6)	Moda Center; 20,068	41–18
60	March 3	L.A. Lakers	L 106–107	LaMarcus Aldridge (21)	Robin Lopez (16)	Lillard, Batum, & Williams (5)	Moda Center; 20,013	41–19
61	March 5	Atlanta	W 102–78	Mo Williams (15)	Nicolas Batum (18)	Damian Lillard (6)	Moda Center; 20,043	42–19
62	March 7	@ Dallas	L 98–103	LaMarcus Aldridge (30)	LaMarcus Aldridge (17)	Nicolas Batum (5)	American Airlines Center; 20,251	42–20
63	March 9	@ Houston	L 113–118 (OT)	LaMarcus Aldridge (28)	Batum & Aldridge (12)	Mo Williams (11)	Toyota Center; 18,321	42–21
64	March 11	@ Memphis	L 99–109	Damian Lillard (32)	LaMarcus Aldridge (10)	Damian Lillard (7)	FedExForum; 17,391	42–22
65	March 12	@ San Antonio	L 90–103	Damian Lillard (23)	Nicolas Batum (14)	Wesley Matthews (4)	AT&T Center; 18,581	42–23
66	March 14	@ New Orleans	W 111–103	Damian Lillard (27)	Nicolas Batum (18)	Batum & Lillard (5)	Smoothie King Center; 16,913	43–23
67	March 16	Golden State	L 112–113	Damian Lillard (26)	Nicolas Batum (14)	Damian Lillard (7)	Moda Center; 20,063	43–24
68	March 18	Milwaukee	W 120–115 (OT)	Wesley Matthews (26)	Robin Lopez (14)	Nicolas Batum (9)	Moda Center; 19,572	44–24
69	March 20	Washington	W 116–103	Wesley Matthews (28)	Nicolas Batum (14)	Damian Lillard (10)	Moda Center; 19,571	45–24
70	March 22	@ Charlotte	L 94–124	Damian Lillard (20)	Batum & Wright (6)	Nicolas Batum (6)	Time Warner Cable Arena; 18,706	45–25
71	March 24	@ Miami	L 91–93	Damian Lillard (19)	Nicolas Batum (10)	Damian Lillard (6)	American Airlines Arena; 20,030	45–26
72	March 25	@ Orlando	L 85–95	Robin Lopez (20)	Robin Lopez (13)	Nicolas Batum (4)	Amway Center; 17,896	45–27
73	March 27	@ Atlanta	W 100–85	LaMarcus Aldridge (25)	LaMarcus Aldridge (16)	Mo Williams (11)	Philips Arena; 13,228	46–27
74	March 28	@ Chicago	W 91–74	Mo Williams (18)	LaMarcus Aldridge (13)	Batum & Lillard (4)	United Center; 22,055	47–27
75	March 30	Memphis	W 105–98	LaMarcus Aldridge (28)	Robin Lopez (10)	Nicolas Batum (6)	Moda Center; 19,994	48–27

April : 6–1 (home: 4–1; road: 2–0)

Game	Date	Team	Score	High points	High rebounds	High assists	Location Attendance	Record
76	April 1	@ L.A. Lakers	W 124–112	Damian Lillard (34)	LaMarcus Aldridge (15)	Damian Lillard (8)	Staples Center; 18,110	49–27
77	April 4	Phoenix	L 93–109	Aldridge & Lopez (18)	Robin Lopez (13)	Damian Lillard (7)	Moda Center; 20,089	49–28
78	April 6	New Orleans	W 100–94	LaMarcus Aldridge (25)	LaMarcus Aldridge (18)	Damian Lillard (5)	Moda Center; 20,036	50–28
79	April 9	Sacramento	W 100–99	LaMarcus Aldridge (22)	Lopez & Robinson (9)	Damian Lillard (10)	Moda Center; 20,002	51–28
80	April 11	@ Utah	W 111–99	Wesley Matthews (21)	LaMarcus Aldridge (14)	Nicolas Batum (7)	EnergySolutions Arena; 19,248	52–28
81	April 13	Golden State	W 119–117 (OT)	LaMarcus Aldridge (26)	Nicolas Batum (12)	Batum & Lillard (5)	Moda Center; 19,995	53–28
82	April 16	L.A. Clippers	W 110–104	Will Barton (23)	Will Barton (10)	Batum & Claver (4)	Moda Center; 20,021	54–28

2013–14 season schedule

== Playoffs ==
=== Game log ===
2014 playoff game log
Total: 5–6 (home: 3–2; road: 2–4)
First Round: 4–2 (home: 2–1; road: 2–1)

Game	Date	Team	Score	High points	High rebounds	High assists	Location Attendance	Series
1	April 20	@ Houston	W 122–120 (OT)	LaMarcus Aldridge (46)	LaMarcus Aldridge (18)	Damian Lillard (5)	Toyota Center; 18,240	1–0
2	April 23	@ Houston	W 112–105	LaMarcus Aldridge (43)	Robin Lopez (10)	Damian Lillard (11)	Toyota Center; 18,331	2–0
3	April 25	Houston	L 116–121 (OT)	Damian Lillard (30)	LaMarcus Aldridge (10)	Damian Lillard (6)	Moda Center; 20,302	2–1
4	April 27	Houston	W 123–120 (OT)	LaMarcus Aldridge (29)	Robin Lopez (11)	Damian Lillard (8)	Moda Center; 20,246	3–1
5	April 30	@ Houston	L 98–108	Wesley Matthews (27)	Aldridge, Lillard & Lopez (8)	Damian Lillard (7)	Toyota Center; 18,230	3–2
6	May 2	Houston	W 99–98	LaMarcus Aldridge (30)	LaMarcus Aldridge (13)	Nicolas Batum (7)	Moda Center; 20,204	4–2

Conference Semifinals: 1–4 (home: 1–1; road: 0–3)

Game	Date	Team	Score	High points	High rebounds	High assists	Location Attendance	Series
1	May 6	@ San Antonio	L 92–116	LaMarcus Aldridge (32)	LaMarcus Aldridge (14)	Mo Williams (4)	AT&T Center; 18,581	0–1
2	May 8	@ San Antonio	L 97–114	Nicolas Batum (21)	LaMarcus Aldridge (10)	Damian Lillard (5)	AT&T Center; 18,581	0–2
3	May 10	San Antonio	L 103–118	Wesley Matthews (22)	LaMarcus Aldridge (12)	Damian Lillard (9)	Moda Center; 20,321	0–3
4	May 12	San Antonio	W 103–92	Damian Lillard (25)	Nicolas Batum (14)	Nicolas Batum (8)	Moda Center; 20,141	1–3
5	May 14	@ San Antonio	L 82–104	LaMarcus Aldridge (21)	Nicolas Batum (12)	Damian Lillard (10)	AT&T Center; 18,581	1–4

2014 playoff schedule

== Player statistics ==
Legend
GP	Games played	GS	Games started	MPG	Minutes per game
FG%	Field-goal percentage	3P%	3-point field-goal percentage	FT%	Free-throw percentage
RPG	Rebounds per game	APG	Assists per game	SPG	Steals per game
BPG	Blocks per game	PPG	Points per game

=== Regular season ===
Portland Trail Blazers statistics
Player	GP	GS	MPG	FG%	3P%	FT%	RPG	APG	SPG	BPG	PPG
Nicolas Batum	82	82	36.0	.465	.361	.803	7.5	5.1	.9	.7	13.0
Damian Lillard	82	82	35.8	.424	.394	.871	3.5	5.6	.8	.3	20.7
Wesley Matthews	82	82	33.9	.441	.393	.837	3.5	2.4	.9	.2	16.4
Robin Lopez	82	82	31.7	.551	.000	.818	8.5	.9	.3	1.7	11.1
Mo Williams	74	0	24.8	.417	.369	.876	2.1	4.3	.7	.1	9.7
Thomas Robinson	70	0	12.5	.481	.000	.564	4.4	.5	.3	.3	4.8
LaMarcus Aldridge	69	69	36.2	.458	.200	.822	11.1	2.6	.9	1.0	23.2
Dorell Wright	68	13	14.5	.374	.342	.754	2.8	.9	.3	.2	5.0
Joel Freeland	52	0	14.0	.475	.000	.690	4.0	.7	.2	.4	3.3
Will Barton	41	0	9.4	.417	.303	.813	1.8	.8	.2	.2	4.0
Meyers Leonard	40	0	8.9	.451	.000	.762	2.8	.5	.2	.1	2.5
CJ McCollum	38	0	12.5	.416	.375	.676	1.3	.7	.4	.1	5.3
Earl Watson	24	0	6.7	.273	.286	1.000	.6	1.2	.2	.0	.5
Víctor Claver	21	0	8.8	.405	.167	.909	1.9	.6	.1	.1	2.2
Allen Crabbe	15	0	6.7	.364	.429	.750	.6	.4	.1	.1	2.2

=== Playoffs ===
Portland Trail Blazers statistics
Player	GP	GS	MPG	FG%	3P%	FT%	RPG	APG	SPG	BPG	PPG
Damian Lillard	11	11	42.4	.439	.386	.894	5.1	6.5	1.0	.1	22.9
Nicolas Batum	11	11	41.7	.472	.350	.800	7.6	4.8	1.3	.5	15.2
LaMarcus Aldridge	11	11	40.1	.452	.667	.800	10.6	1.5	.6	1.6	26.2
Wesley Matthews	11	11	38.7	.412	.324	.813	3.9	1.3	1.3	.5	14.5
Robin Lopez	11	11	33.4	.489		.667	9.2	.8	.5	1.8	10.0
Thomas Robinson	11	0	11.1	.419		.857	2.5	.5	.5	.5	2.9
Joel Freeland	9	0	2.7	.000		.500	.9	.1	.1	.1	.1
Mo Williams	8	0	23.4	.373	.238	.909	1.5	1.9	.4	.0	7.4
Dorell Wright	8	0	11.0	.368	.333	.733	2.0	.4	.4	1.1	3.6
Will Barton	7	0	11.6	.500	.545	.833	1.7	.4	.1	.3	6.4
CJ McCollum	6	0	4.0	.091	.000	1.000	.2	.0	.0	.0	.7
Earl Watson	4	0	3.5	.000	.000		.3	.3	.0	.0	.0
Meyers Leonard	4	0	2.3	.000			.5	.0	.0	.0	.0
Víctor Claver	2	0	3.5			.000	2.5	.0	.0	.0	.0

- ^{†} Denotes player spent time with another team in the season. Stats reflect time with the Trail Blazers only.
