= 2013–14 New Orleans Pelicans season =

Sports season

- Head coach: Monty Williams
- General manager: Dell Demps
- Owner: Tom Benson
- Arena: New Orleans Arena (Renamed Smoothie King Center after February 5, 2014)

Results
- Record: 34–48 (.415)
- Place: Division: 5th (Southwest); Conference: 12th (Western)
- Playoff finish: Did not qualify
- Stats at Basketball Reference

Local media
- Television: Fox Sports New Orleans
- Radio: WWL-FM

The 2013–14 New Orleans Pelicans season was the franchise's 12th season in the National Basketball Association (NBA), and the first under the "Pelicans" name.

== Key dates ==
- June 27: The 2013 NBA draft took place at the Barclays Center in Brooklyn, New York.
- July 1: 2013 NBA Free Agency begins.

== Draft picks ==
Round	Pick	Player	Position	Nationality	Team
1	6	Nerlens Noel	C	(United States) American	Kentucky

The franchise entered the draft for the first time as the New Orleans Pelicans with one first-round pick. They had previously traded their second-round pick to the Philadelphia 76ers in 2012.

== Roster ==
2013–14 New Orleans Pelicans roster
Players

Pos.	No.	Player	Height	Weight	DOB	From
C	42	Alexis Ajinça	7 ft 2 in (2.18 m)	248 lb (112 kg)	1988-05-06	France
SF	0	Al-Farouq Aminu	6 ft 9 in (2.06 m)	215 lb (98 kg)	1990-09-21	Wake Forest
PF	33	Ryan Anderson	6 ft 10 in (2.08 m)	240 lb (109 kg)	1988-05-06	California
PF	8	Luke Babbitt	6 ft 9 in (2.06 m)	225 lb (102 kg)	1989-06-20	Nevada
PF	23	Anthony Davis	6 ft 10 in (2.08 m)	220 lb (100 kg)	1993-03-11	Kentucky
C	4	Melvin Ely	6 ft 10 in (2.08 m)	245 lb (111 kg)	1978-05-02	Fresno State
SF	1	Tyreke Evans	6 ft 6 in (1.98 m)	220 lb (100 kg)	1989-09-19	Memphis
SG	10	Eric Gordon	6 ft 4 in (1.93 m)	215 lb (98 kg)	1988-12-25	Indiana
PG	11	Jrue Holiday	6 ft 4 in (1.93 m)	205 lb (93 kg)	1990-06-12	UCLA
SF	2	Darius Miller	6 ft 8 in (2.03 m)	225 lb (102 kg)	1990-03-21	Kentucky
SG	3	Anthony Morrow	6 ft 5 in (1.96 m)	210 lb (95 kg)	1985-09-27	Georgia Tech
PG	25	Austin Rivers	6 ft 4 in (1.93 m)	200 lb (91 kg)	1992-08-01	Duke
PG	22	Brian Roberts	6 ft 1 in (1.85 m)	173 lb (78 kg)	1985-12-03	Dayton
PF	14	Jason Smith	7 ft 0 in (2.13 m)	240 lb (109 kg)	1986-03-02	Colorado State
SF	31	James Southerland	6 ft 8 in (2.03 m)	221 lb (100 kg)	1990-04-28	Syracuse
C	5	Jeff Withey	7 ft 0 in (2.13 m)	235 lb (107 kg)	1990-03-07	Kansas

Coaches
Head coach
- Monty Williams
Assistant(s)
- Bryan Gates
- Dave Hanners
- Fred Vinson
- Carlos Daniel (player development)
- Jon Ishop (trainer)

Legend
- (DP) Unsigned draft pick
- (FA) Free agent
- (S) Suspended
- (DL) On assignment to D-League affiliate
- Injured

Roster
Updated: April 14, 2014

== Pre-season ==
2013 pre-season game log
Total: 7–1 (Home: 2–1; Road: 5–0)
Pre-season: 7–1 (home: 2–1; road: 5–0)

Game	Date	Team	Score	High points	High rebounds	High assists	Location Attendance	Record
1	October 5	@ Houston	W 116–115	Anthony Morrow (26)	Arinze Onuaku (7)	Austin Rivers (5)	Toyota Center; 15,049	1–0
2	October 7	@ Dallas	W 94–92	Anthony Davis (25)	Anthony Davis (7)	Jrue Holiday (6)	American Airlines Center; 15,082	2–0
3	October 9	@ Orlando	W 99–95	Anthony Davis (29)	Anthony Davis (9)	Jrue Holiday (9)	Veterans Memorial Arena; 9,274	3–0
4	October 13	Atlanta	W 105–73	Anthony Davis (23)	Anthony Davis (9)	Brian Roberts (8)	Mississippi Coast Coliseum; 3,956	4–0
5	October 17	@ Oklahoma City	W 105–102	Eric Gordon (21)	Al-Farouq Aminu (10)	Jrue Holiday (8)	BOK Center; 17,778	5–0
6	October 19	Washington	W 93–89	Jrue Holiday (19)	Jason Smith (9)	Jrue Holiday (8)	Rupp Arena; 14,980	6–0
7	October 23	Miami	L 95–108	Eric Gordon (19)	Al-Farouq Aminu (9)	Jrue Holiday (6)	New Orleans Arena; 17,123	6–1
8	October 25	@ Orlando	W 101–82	Brian Roberts (21)	Jeff Withey (5)	Holiday, Evans, Roberts (3)	Amway Center; 13,401	7–1

2013–14 season schedule

== Regular season ==
=== Season standings ===
Southwest Division	W	L	PCT	GB	Home	Road	Div	GP
z-San Antonio Spurs	62	20	.756	–	32‍–‍9	30‍–‍11	12–4	82
x-Houston Rockets	54	28	.659	8.0	33‍–‍8	21‍–‍20	11–5	82
x-Memphis Grizzlies	50	32	.610	12.0	27‍–‍14	23‍–‍18	4–12	82
x-Dallas Mavericks	49	33	.598	13.0	26‍–‍15	23‍–‍18	9–7	82
New Orleans Pelicans	34	48	.415	28.0	22‍–‍19	12‍–‍29	4–12	82

Western Conference
#	Team	W	L	PCT	GB	GP
1	z-San Antonio Spurs *	62	20	.756	–	82
2	y-Oklahoma City Thunder *	59	23	.720	3.0	82
3	y-Los Angeles Clippers *	57	25	.695	5.0	82
4	x-Houston Rockets	54	28	.659	8.0	82
5	x-Portland Trail Blazers	54	28	.659	8.0	82
6	x-Golden State Warriors	51	31	.622	11.0	82
7	x-Memphis Grizzlies	50	32	.610	12.0	82
8	x-Dallas Mavericks	49	33	.598	13.0	82
9	Phoenix Suns	48	34	.585	14.0	82
10	Minnesota Timberwolves	40	42	.488	22.0	82
11	Denver Nuggets	36	46	.439	26.0	82
12	New Orleans Pelicans	34	48	.415	28.0	82
13	Sacramento Kings	28	54	.341	34.0	82
14	Los Angeles Lakers	27	55	.329	35.0	82
15	Utah Jazz	25	57	.305	37.0	82

=== Game log ===
2013–14 game log
Total: 34–48 (Home: 22–19; Road: 12–29)
October: 0–1 (home: 0–1; road: 0–0)

Game	Date	Team	Score	High points	High rebounds	High assists	Location Attendance	Record
1	October 30	Indiana	L 90–95	Eric Gordon (25)	Anthony Davis (12)	Jrue Holiday (5)	New Orleans Arena; 17,803	0–1

November : 7–7 (home: 4–2; road: 3–5)

Game	Date	Team	Score	High points	High rebounds	High assists	Location Attendance	Record
2	November 1	@ Orlando	L 90–110	Anthony Davis (26)	Anthony Davis (17)	Jrue Holiday (5)	Amway Center; 18,846	0–2
3	November 2	Charlotte	W 105–84	Anthony Davis (25)	Anthony Davis (8)	Jrue Holiday (8)	New Orleans Arena; 15,232	1–2
4	November 5	Phoenix	L 98–104	Eric Gordon (20)	Anthony Davis (11)	Jrue Holiday (9)	New Orleans Arena; 13,404	1–3
5	November 6	@ Memphis	W 99–84	Eric Gordon (19)	Anthony Davis (9)	Tyreke Evans (4)	FedExForum; 15,209	2–3
6	November 8	L.A. Lakers	W 96–85	Anthony Davis (32)	Anthony Davis (12)	Jrue Holiday (13)	New Orleans Arena; 18,209	3–3
7	November 10	@ Phoenix	L 94–101	Jason Smith (22)	Anthony Davis (12)	Jrue Holiday (7)	US Airways Center; 13,154	3–4
8	November 12	@ L.A. Lakers	L 95–116	Eric Gordon (17)	Aminu, Davis, Withey (5)	Tyreke Evans (6)	Staples Center; 18,426	3–5
9	November 13	@ Utah	L 105–111	Anthony Davis (29)	Anthony Davis (15)	Jrue Holiday (6)	EnergySolutions Arena; 16,717	3–6
10	November 16	Philadelphia	W 135–98	Ryan Anderson (26)	Anthony Davis (9)	Jrue Holiday (12)	New Orleans Arena; 16,659	4–6
11	November 20	Utah	W 105–98	Anthony Davis (22)	Anthony Davis (9)	Aminu, Davis, Evans, Holiday, Rivers (4)	New Orleans Arena; 13,203	5–6
12	November 22	Cleveland	W 104–100	Eric Gordon (19)	Anthony Davis (13)	Jrue Holiday (11)	New Orleans Arena; 15,186	6–6
13	November 25	@ San Antonio	L 93–112	Ryan Anderson (17)	Jrue Holiday (9)	Jrue Holiday (7)	AT&T Center; 18,323	6–7
14	November 26	Golden State	L 101–102	Ryan Anderson (21)	Ryan Anderson (12)	Eric Gordon (7)	New Orleans Arena; 15,330	6–8
15	November 29	@ Philadelphia	W 121–105	Eric Gordon (26)	Anthony Davis (10)	Jrue Holiday (13)	Wells Fargo Center; 17,807	7–8

December : 7–7 (home: 4–2; road: 3–5)

Game	Date	Team	Score	High points	High rebounds	High assists	Location Attendance	Record
16	December 1	@ New York	W 103–98	Ryan Anderson (31)	Ryan Anderson (6)	Jrue Holiday (9)	Madison Square Garden; 19,812	8–8
17	December 2	@ Chicago	W 131–128 (3OT)	Ryan Anderson (36)	Jason Smith (14)	Jrue Holiday (12)	United Center; 21,615	9–8
18	December 4	Dallas	L 97–100	Jrue Holiday (26)	Al-Farouq Aminu (20)	Jrue Holiday (9)	New Orleans Arena; 14,524	9–9
19	December 6	Oklahoma City	L 95–109	Ryan Anderson (18)	Jason Smith (12)	Jrue Holiday (6)	New Orleans Arena; 17,694	9–10
20	December 11	Detroit	W 111–106 (OT)	Anderson, Smith (22)	Jason Smith (16)	Jrue Holiday (8)	New Orleans Arena; 14,517	10–10
21	December 13	Memphis	W 104–98	Eric Gordon (25)	Anderson, Amundson (14)	Jrue Holiday (12)	New Orleans Arena; 15,516	11–10
22	December 15	@ Denver	L 93–102	Ryan Anderson (26)	Lou Amundson (8)	Jrue Holiday (7)	Pepsi Center; 15,111	11–11
23	December 17	@ Golden State	L 93–104	Ryan Anderson (21)	Al-Farouq Aminu (8)	Jrue Holiday (6)	Oracle Arena; 19,596	11–12
24	December 18	@ L.A. Clippers	L 95–108	Anthony Davis (22)	Tyreke Evans (13)	Holiday & Evans (10)	Staples Center; 19,060	11–13
25	December 21	@ Portland	L 107–110	Anthony Davis (21)	Alexis Ajinça (11)	Jrue Holiday (7)	Moda Center; 20,027	11–14
26	December 23	@ Sacramento	W 113–100	Tyreke Evans (25)	Anthony Davis (11)	Tyreke Evans (12)	Sleep Train Arena; 17,317	12–14
27	December 27	Denver	W 105–89	Tyreke Evans (19)	Ryan Anderson (10)	Tyreke Evans (10)	New Orleans Arena; 18,089	13–14
28	December 28	@ Houston	L 98–110	Ryan Anderson (22)	Anthony Davis (16)	Jrue Holiday & Tyreke Evans (9)	Toyota Center; 18,233	13–15
29	December 30	Portland	W 110–108	Jrue Holiday (31)	Al-Farouq Aminu (15)	Jrue Holiday (13)	New Orleans Arena; 17,035	14–15

January : 5–11 (home: 1–6; road: 4–5)

Game	Date	Team	Score	High points	High rebounds	High assists	Location Attendance	Record
30	January 1	@ Minnesota	L 112–124	Ryan Anderson (25)	Tyreke Evans (7)	Jrue Holiday (5)	Target Center; 14,002	14–16
31	January 3	@ Boston	W 95–92	Anthony Davis (23)	Anthony Davis (9)	Tyreke Evans (6)	TD Garden; 18,624	15–16
32	January 4	@ Indiana	L 82–99	Eric Gordon (21)	Anthony Davis (8)	Jrue Holiday (7)	Bankers Life Fieldhouse; 18,165	15–17
33	January 7	@ Miami	L 88–107	Anthony Davis (22)	Anthony Davis (12)	Jrue Holiday (7)	American Airlines Arena; 20,097	15–18
34	January 8	Washington	L 96–102	Eric Gordon (23)	Anthony Davis (7)	Tyreke Evans (5)	New Orleans Arena; 17,557	15–19
35	January 10	Dallas	L 90–107	Eric Gordon (27)	Anthony Davis (13)	Austin Rivers (4)	New Orleans Arena; 16,533	15–20
36	January 11	@ Dallas	L 107–110	Anthony Davis (28)	Anthony Davis (14)	Brian Roberts (8)	American Airlines Center; 20,116	15–21
37	January 13	San Antonio	L 95–101	Anthony Davis (22)	Al-Farouq Aminu (13)	Austin Rivers (5)	New Orleans Arena; 15,552	15–22
38	January 15	Houston	L 100–103	Eric Gordon (35)	Al-Farouq Aminu (8)	Eric Gordon (6)	New Orleans Arena; 15,918	15–23
39	January 18	Golden State	L 87–97	Anthony Davis (31)	Anthony Davis (17)	Eric Gordon (6)	New Orleans Arena; 18,045	15–24
40	January 20	@ Memphis	W 95–92	Anthony Davis (27)	Anthony Davis (10)	Tyreke Evans (7)	FedExForum; 17,485	16–24
41	January 21	Sacramento	L 97–114	Tyreke Evans (17)	Anthony Davis (6)	Brian Roberts (6)	New Orleans Arena; 16,459	16–25
42	January 24	@ Detroit	W 103–101	Anthony Morrow (21)	Anthony Davis (8)	three players (3)	Palace of Auburn Hills; 14,107	17–25
43	January 26	Orlando	W 100–92	Tyreke Evans (23)	Anthony Davis (19)	Tyreke Evans (7)	New Orleans Arena; 17,197	18–25
44	January 28	@ Cleveland	W 100–89	Anthony Davis (30)	Greg Stiemsma (11)	Eric Gordon (9)	Quicken Loans Arena; 13,985	19–25
45	January 29	@ Minnesota	L 77–88	Al-Farouq Aminu (18)	Al-Farouq Aminu & Greg Stiemsma (12)	Brian Roberts (basketball) & Tyreke Evans (3)	Target Center; 11,702	19–26

February : 4–9 (home: 3–3; road: 1–6)

Game	Date	Team	Score	High points	High rebounds	High assists	Location Attendance	Record
46	February 1	Chicago	W 88–79	Anthony Davis (24)	Anthony Davis (8)	Tyreke Evans (6)	New Orleans Arena; 17,799	20–26
47	February 3	San Antonio	L 95–102	Anthony Morrow (20)	Anthony Davis (16)	Austin Rivers (5)	New Orleans Arena; 17,086	20–27
48	February 5	Atlanta	W 105–100	Anthony Davis (27)	Anthony Davis (10)	Brian Roberts (6)	New Orleans Arena; 16,232	21–27
49	February 7	Minnesota	W 98–91	Anthony Davis (26)	Anthony Davis (10)	Brian Roberts (6)	Smoothie King Center; 16,541	22–27
50	February 9	@ Brooklyn	L 81–93	Anthony Davis (24)	Anthony Davis (9)	Austin Rivers (5)	Barclays Center; 17,732	22–28
51	February 10	@ Toronto	L 101–108	Tyreke Evans (23)	Anthony Davis (7)	Tyreke Evans (10)	Air Canada Centre; 17,596	22–29
52	February 12	@ Milwaukee	W 102–98	Eric Gordon (21)	Alexis Ajinca (9)	Eric Gordon (6)	BMO Harris Bradley Center; 11,012	23–29
All-Star Break
53	February 19	New York	L 91–98	Eric Gordon (28)	Anthony Davis (10)	Brian Roberts (4)	Smoothie King Center	23–30
54	February 21	@ Charlotte	L 87–90	Brian Roberts (20)	Anthony Davis (13)	Tyreke Evans (7)	Time Warner Cable Arena; 15,867	23–31
55	February 22	@ Washington	L 93–94	Anthony Davis (26)	Anthony Davis (11)	Brian Roberts (9)	Verizon Center; 18,385	23–32
56	February 24	L.A. Clippers	L 110–123	Anthony Davis (26)	Alexis Ajinca (12)	Brian Roberts (7)	Smoothie King Center; 16,185	23–33
57	February 26	@ Dallas	L 89–108	Eric Gordon (19)	Anthony Davis (9)	Tyreke Evans (7)	American Airlines Center; 19,729	23–34
58	February 28	@ Phoenix	L 104–116	Anthony Davis (32)	Anthony Davis (9)	Evans, Gordon & Roberts (4)	US Airways Center; 16,578	23–35

March : 9–7 (home: 7–4; road: 2–3)

Game	Date	Team	Score	High points	High rebounds	High assists	Location Attendance	Record
59	March 1	@ L.A. Clippers	L 76–108	Tyreke Evans (22)	Alexis Ajinca (10)	Tyreke Evans (5)	Staples Center; 19,060	23–36
60	March 3	@ Sacramento	L 89–96	Tyreke Evans (27)	Tyreke Evans (10)	Tyreke Evans (8)	Sleep Train Arena; 16,225	23–37
61	March 4	@ L.A. Lakers	W 132–125	Gordon & Davis (28)	Anthony Davis (15)	Tyreke Evans (11)	Staples Center; 18,436	24–37
62	March 7	Milwaukee	W 112–104	Anthony Davis (29)	Anthony Davis (10)	Anthony Davis (14)	Smoothie King Center; 16,061	25–37
63	March 9	Denver	W 111–107 (OT)	Anthony Davis (32)	Anthony Davis (17)	Roberts & Rivers (5)	Smoothie King Center; 17,115	26–37
64	March 12	Memphis	L 88–90	Anthony Davis (29)	Anthony Davis (10)	Austin Rivers (9)	Smoothie King Center; 16,513	26–38
65	March 14	Portland	L 103–111	Anthony Davis (36)	Anthony Davis (9)	Tyreke Evans (8)	Smoothie King Center; 16,913	26–39
66	March 16	Boston	W 121–120 (OT)	Anthony Davis (40)	Anthony Davis (21)	Eric Gordon (8)	Smoothie King Center; 17,050	27–39
67	March 19	Toronto	L 100–107	Al-Farouq Aminu (19)	Al-Farouq Aminu (10)	Tyreke Evans (3)	Smoothie King Center; 15,282	27–40
68	March 21	@ Atlanta	W 111–105	Anthony Davis (34)	Anthony Davis (11)	Brian Roberts (5)	Philips Arena; 15,476	28–40
69	March 22	Miami	W 105–95	Anthony Davis (30)	Anthony Davis (11)	Tyreke Evans (8)	Smoothie King Center; 18,185	29–40
70	March 24	Brooklyn	W 109–104	Tyreke Evans (33)	Anthony Davis (14)	Tyreke Evans (7)	Smoothie King Center; 14,599	30–40
71	March 26	L.A. Clippers	W 98–96	Anthony Morrow (27)	Anthony Davis (13)	Tyreke Evans (9)	Smoothie King Center; 16,363	31–40
72	March 28	Utah	W 102–95	Tyreke Evans (22)	Alexis Ajinça (10)	Tyreke Evans (15)	Smoothie King Center; 17,699	32–40
73	March 29	@ San Antonio	L 80–96	Brian Roberts (18)	Al-Farouq Aminu (10)	Brian Roberts (5)	AT&T Center; 18,581	32–41
74	March 31	Sacramento	L 97–102	Anthony Morrow (23)	Anthony Davis (8)	Austin Rivers (9)	Smoothie King Center; 15,548	32–42

April : 2–6 (home: 2–1; road: 0–5)

Game	Date	Team	Score	High points	High rebounds	High assists	Location Attendance	Record
75	April 2	@ Denver	L 107–137	Tyreke Evans (27)	Tyreke Evans (8)	Brian Roberts (6)	Pepsi Center; 14,783	32–43
76	April 4	@ Utah	L 96–100	Anthony Morrow (26)	Davis & Stiemsma (6)	Brian Roberts (6)	EnergySolutions Arena; 19,681	32–44
77	April 6	@ Portland	L 94–100	Anthony Morrow (17)	Al-Farouq Aminu (9)	Tyreke Evans (8)	Moda Center; 20,036	32–45
78	April 9	Phoenix	L 88–94	Jeff Withey (17)	Evans & Stiemsma (8)	Austin Rivers (8)	Smoothie King Center; 16,256	32–46
79	April 11	@ Oklahoma City	L 94–116	Miller & Rivers (18)	Austin Rivers (8)	Tyreke Evans (6)	Chesapeake Energy Arena; 18,203	32–47
80	April 12	@ Houston	L 104–111	Luke Babbitt (24)	Austin Rivers (10)	Austin Rivers (6)	Toyota Center; 18,372	32–48
81	April 14	Oklahoma City	W 101–89	Tyreke Evans (41)	Tyreke Evans (9)	Tyreke Evans (8)	Smoothie King Center; 17,024	33–48
82	April 16	Houston	W 105–100	Tyreke Evans (25)	Luke Babbitt (8)	Tyreke Evans (10)	Smoothie King Center; 17,421	34–48

2013–14 season schedule

== Player statistics ==
Legend
GP	Games played	GS	Games started	MPG	Minutes per game
FG%	Field-goal percentage	3P%	3-point field-goal percentage	FT%	Free-throw percentage
RPG	Rebounds per game	APG	Assists per game	SPG	Steals per game
BPG	Blocks per game	PPG	Points per game

=== Regular season ===
New Orleans Pelicans statistics
Player	GP	GS	MPG	FG%	3P%	FT%	RPG	APG	SPG	BPG	PPG
Al-Farouq Aminu	80	65	25.6	.474	.271	.664	6.2	1.4	1.0	.5	7.2
Anthony Morrow	76	9	18.8	.458	.451	.828	1.8	.8	.5	.2	8.4
Brian Roberts	72	42	23.2	.420	.360	.940	1.9	3.3	.6	.1	9.4
Tyreke Evans	72	22	28.2	.436	.221	.771	4.7	5.0	1.2	.3	14.5
Austin Rivers	69	4	19.4	.405	.364	.636	1.9	2.3	.7	.1	7.7
Anthony Davis	67	66	35.2	.519	.222	.791	10.0	1.6	1.3	2.8	20.8
Eric Gordon	64	64	32.1	.436	.391	.785	2.6	3.3	1.2	.2	15.4
Jeff Withey	58	4	11.8	.535	.000	.712	2.6	.4	.3	.9	3.3
Alexis Ajinça	56	30	17.0	.546	.000	.836	4.9	.7	.4	.8	5.9
Greg Stiemsma	55	20	18.3	.574	.000	.594	4.1	.7	.6	1.0	2.9
Darius Miller	45	7	16.1	.440	.325	.806	1.2	1.0	.5	.2	4.4
Jrue Holiday	34	34	33.6	.447	.390	.810	4.2	7.9	1.6	.4	14.3
Jason Smith	31	27	26.8	.465		.780	5.8	.9	.4	.9	9.7
Luke Babbitt	27	2	17.5	.390	.379	.778	3.3	1.1	.3	.4	6.3
Ryan Anderson	22	14	36.1	.438	.409	.952	6.5	.8	.5	.3	19.8
Lou Amundson^{†}	18	0	10.2	.500		.250	3.1	.3	.5	.6	2.1
Lance Thomas	5	0	8.4	.222		.500	1.4	.6	.0	.0	1.2
Josh Childress	4	0	6.0				.8	.5	.3	.0	.0
James Southerland^{†}	3	0	9.0	.417	.600	.500	2.7	.0	.3	.7	4.7
Arinze Onuaku^{†}	3	0	8.3	.250		.500	2.3	1.0	.0	.0	1.0
Melvin Ely	2	0	13.5	.500			.5	.0	.0	.5	3.0

- ^{†} Denotes player spent time with another team in the season. Stats reflect time with the Pelicans only.
