= 2013–14 Houston Rockets season =

- Head coach: Kevin McHale
- General manager: Daryl Morey
- Owners: Leslie Alexander
- Arena: Toyota Center

Results
- Record: 54–28 (.659)
- Place: Division: 2nd (Southwest); Conference: 4th (Western)
- Playoff finish: First Round (Lost to Trail Blazers 2–4)
- Stats at Basketball Reference

Local media
- Television: CSN Houston
- Radio: Sportstalk 790

The 2013–14 Houston Rockets season was the 47th season of the franchise in the National Basketball Association (NBA), and the 43rd based in Houston. The season is best remembered for acquiring All-Star Dwight Howard from the Los Angeles Lakers. With Howard teamed up with team captain James Harden, they gelled their first season together, being named as starters for the 2014 NBA All-Star Game. With Howard now as co-captain, the Rockets improved on last season and finished with a 54–28 record, finishing 4th in the Western Conference. They met the Portland Trail Blazers in the first round, but the presences of Howard and Harden were not enough as Houston fell in six games, thanks to a Damian Lillard series-clinching three pointer in Game 6.

Point guard Jeremy Lin, who was co-captain the year prior, was moved to a sixth man role, as Patrick Beverley earned the starting position. After the season, Lin was traded to the Los Angeles Lakers, and his two-year tenure with Houston came to an end. Along with Lin was Chandler Parsons who became a free agent and later signed with the Dallas Mavericks and center Omer Asik who, after two seasons with the team, was traded to the New Orleans Pelicans.

== Draft picks ==
Round	Pick	Player	Position	Nationality	College/Team
2	34	Isaiah Canaan	PG	United States	Murray State

== Roster ==
2013–14 Houston Rockets roster
Players

Pos.	No.	Player	Height	Weight	DOB	From
C	3	Ömer Aşık	7 ft 0 in (2.13 m)	255 lb (116 kg)	1986–07–04	Turkey
G	2	Patrick Beverley	6 ft 1 in (1.85 m)	185 lb (84 kg)	1988–07–12	Arkansas
G	1	Isaiah Canaan	6 ft 0 in (1.83 m)	188 lb (85 kg)	1991–05–02	Murray State
F	18	Omri Casspi	6 ft 9 in (2.06 m)	225 lb (102 kg)	1988–06–22	Israel
F	33	Robert Covington	6 ft 9 in (2.06 m)	215 lb (98 kg)	1991–07–15	Virginia Commonwealth
G/F	32	Francisco García	6 ft 7 in (2.01 m)	195 lb (88 kg)	1980–12–31	Louisville
G/F	5	Jordan Hamilton	6 ft 7 in (2.01 m)	220 lb (100 kg)	1990–06–10	Texas
G	13	James Harden	6 ft 5 in (1.96 m)	220 lb (100 kg)	1989–08–26	Arizona State
C	12	Dwight Howard	6 ft 11 in (2.11 m)	265 lb (120 kg)	1985–12–08	SW Atlanta Academy (GA)
F	6	Terrence Jones	6 ft 9 in (2.06 m)	252 lb (114 kg)	1992–01–09	Kentucky
G	7	Jeremy Lin	6 ft 3 in (1.91 m)	200 lb (91 kg)	1988–08–23	Harvard
F/C	20	Donatas Motiejūnas	7 ft 0 in (2.13 m)	222 lb (101 kg)	1990–09–20	Lithuania
F	25	Chandler Parsons	6 ft 9 in (2.06 m)	227 lb (103 kg)	1988–10–25	Florida
F/C	21	Josh Powell	6 ft 9 in (2.06 m)	225 lb (102 kg)	1983–01–25	NC State

Coaches
Head coach
- Kevin McHale
Assistant(s)
- J. B. Bickerstaff
- Chris Finch
- Dean Cooper
- Greg Buckner

Legend
- (DP) Unsigned draft pick
- (FA) Free agent
- (S) Suspended
- (DL) On assignment to D-League affiliate
- Injured

Roster
Updated: 2014–04–22

== Pre-season ==
2013 pre-season game log
Total: 6–1 (home: 3–1; road: 3–0)
Pre-season: 6–1 (home: 3–1; road: 3–0)

Game	Date	Team	Score	High points	High rebounds	High assists	Location Attendance	Record
1	October 5	New Orleans	L 115–116	James Harden (21)	Dwight Howard (9)	Patrick Beverley (5)	Toyota Center; 15,049	0–1
2	October 10	@ Indiana	W 116–96	James Harden (21)	Omri Casspi (10)	Jeremy Lin (5)	Mall of Asia Arena; 12,885	1–1
3	October 13	Indiana	W 107–98	James Harden (21)	Omri Casspi (9)	Patrick Beverley (5)	Taipei Arena; 13,686	2–1
4	October 16	Orlando	W 108–104	James Harden (21)	Patrick Beverley (9)	Casspi & Brooks (5)	Toyota Center; 12,341	3–1
5	October 21	Dallas	W 100–95	James Harden (19)	Dwight Howard (17)	Jeremy Lin (8)	Toyota Center; 13,380	4–1
6	October 24	@ San Antonio	W 109–92	James Harden (22)	Dwight Howard (16)	James Harden (11)	AT&T Center; 16,247	5–1
8	October 23	@ Memphis	W 92–73	Omri Casspi (11)	Dwight Howard (10)	Chandler Parsons (5)	FedExForum; 12,271	6–1

2013–14 season schedule

== Regular season ==
=== Game log ===
2013–14 game log
Total: 54–28 (home: 33–8; road: 21–20)
October: 1–0 (home: 1–0; road: 0–0)

Game	Date	Team	Score	High points	High rebounds	High assists	Location Attendance	Record
1	October 30	Charlotte	W 96–83	James Harden (21)	Dwight Howard (26)	James Harden (5)	Toyota Center; 18,083	1–0

November : 12–5 (home: 7–2; road: 5–3)

Game	Date	Team	Score	High points	High rebounds	High assists	Location Attendance	Record
2	November 1	Dallas	W 113–105	James Harden (34)	Dwight Howard (16)	Jeremy Lin (4)	Toyota Center; 18,142	2–0
3	November 2	@ Utah	W 104–83	Chandler Parsons (24)	Chandler Parsons (12)	Chandler Parsons (6)	EnergySolutions Arena; 19,498	3–0
4	November 4	@ L.A Clippers	L 118–137	Omri Casspi (19)	Howard & Casspi (9)	Jeremy Lin (8)	Staples Center; 19,404	3–1
5	November 5	@ Portland	W 116–101	James Harden (33)	Dwight Howard (13)	Omri Casspi (5)	Moda Center; 17,491	4–1
6	November 7	L.A Lakers	L 98–99	James Harden (35)	Dwight Howard (14)	James Harden (5)	Toyota Center; 18,133	4–2
7	November 9	L.A Clippers	L 94–107	Chandler Parsons (23)	Howard & Parsons (8)	Jeremy Lin (7)	Toyota Center; 18,108	4–3
8	November 11	Toronto	W 110–104	Jeremy Lin (31)	Dwight Howard (24)	James Harden (10)	Toyota Center; 18,134	5–3
9	November 13	@ Philadelphia	L 117–123 (OT)	Jeremy Lin (34)	Dwight Howard (15)	Jeremy Lin (12)	Wells Fargo Center; 11,671	5–4
10	November 14	@ New York	W 109–106	James Harden (36)	Dwight Howard (15)	Jeremy Lin (3)	Madison Square Garden; 19,812	6–4
11	November 16	Denver	W 122–111	Dwight Howard (25)	Terrence Jones (12)	James Harden (9)	Toyota Center; 18,147	7–4
12	November 19	Boston	W 109–85	Terrence Jones (24)	Dwight Howard (12)	Chandler Parsons (6)	Toyota Center; 18,232	8–4
13	November 20	@ Dallas	L 120–123	Dwight Howard (33)	Dwight Howard (11)	Chandler Parsons (11)	American Airlines Center; 20,045	8–5
14	November 23	Minnesota	W 112–101	Aaron Brooks (26)	Dwight Howard (13)	Lin & Brooks (5)	Toyota Center; 18,196	9–5
15	November 25	@ Memphis	W 93–86	Chandler Parsons (17)	Ömer Aşık (10)	Lin, Beverley, Jones & García (2)	FedExForum; 15,246	10–5
16	November 27	Atlanta	W 113–84	Brooks & García (21)	Ömer Aşık (9)	Parsons, Howard & Brooks (4)	Toyota Center; 18,051	11–5
17	November 29	Brooklyn	W 114–95	Chandler Parsons (21)	Howard & Jones (7)	Harden & Brooks (7)	Toyota Center; 18,138	12–5
18	November 30	@ San Antonio	W 112–106	James Harden (31)	Terrence Jones (16)	James Harden (6)	AT&T Center; 18,581	13–5

December : 8–8 (home: 5–3; road: 3–5)

Game	Date	Team	Score	High points	High rebounds	High assists	Location Attendance	Record
19	December 2	@ Utah	L 103–109	James Harden (37)	Dwight Howard (9)	James Harden (8)	EnergySolutions Arena; 15,801	13–6
20	December 4	Phoenix	L 88–97	Aaron Brooks (17)	Dwight Howard (18)	Aaron Brooks (6)	Toyota Center; 18,151	13–7
21	December 6	Golden State	W 105–83	James Harden (34)	Dwight Howard (18)	Chandler Parsons (5)	Toyota Center; 18,145	14–7
22	December 8	Orlando	W 98–88	James Harden (27)	Dwight Howard (22)	James Harden (10)	Toyota Center; 16,407	15–7
23	December 12	@ Portland	L 104–111	Dwight Howard (32)	Dwight Howard (17)	James Harden (7)	Moda Center; 19,997	15–8
24	December 13	@ Golden State	W 116–112	James Harden (26)	Dwight Howard (11)	James Harden (9)	Oracle Arena; 19,596	16–8
25	December 15	@ Sacramento	L 91–106	James Harden (25)	Dwight Howard (10)	Chandler Parsons (5)	Sleep Train Arena; 15,606	16–9
26	December 18	Chicago	W 109–94	Dwight Howard (23)	Howard & Parsons (9)	Harden & Jones (6)	Toyota Center; 18,242	17–9
27	December 20	@ Indiana	L 81–114	Dwight Howard (19)	Dwight Howard (12)	Harden, Howard & Parsons (2)	Bankers Life Fieldhouse; 18,165	17–10
28	December 21	@ Detroit	W 114–97	Dwight Howard (35)	Dwight Howard (19)	Brooks & Casspi (7)	The Palace of Auburn Hills; 14,606	18–10
29	December 23	Dallas	L 104–111	Dwight Howard (29)	Dwight Howard (15)	Francisco García (6)	Toyota Center; 18,328	18–11
30	December 25	@ San Antonio	W 111–98	James Harden (28)	Dwight Howard (20)	Jeremy Lin (8)	AT&T Center; 18,581	19–11
31	December 26	Memphis	W 100–92	James Harden (27)	Chandler Parsons (11)	Harden & Parsons (5)	Toyota Center; 18,201	20–11
32	December 28	New Orleans	W 107–98	Dwight Howard (24)	Dwight Howard (18)	Jeremy Lin (5)	Toyota Center; 18,233	21–11
33	December 29	@ Oklahoma City	L 86–117	Aaron Brooks (17)	Howard & Jones (9)	James Harden (3)	Chesapeake Energy Arena; 18,203	21–12
34	December 31	Sacramento	L 106–110	James Harden (38)	Terrence Jones (11)	Jeremy Lin (6)	Toyota Center; 18,232	21–13

January : 10–4 (home: 6–2; road: 4–2)

Game	Date	Team	Score	High points	High rebounds	High assists	Location Attendance	Record
35	January 3	New York	W 102–100	James Harden (37)	Chandler Parsons (11)	James Harden (6)	Toyota Center; 18,304	22–13
36	January 8	L.A Lakers	W 113–99	James Harden (38)	Howard & Jones (13)	Harden, Lin & Casspi (4)	Toyota Center; 18,229	23–13
37	January 10	@ Atlanta	L 80–83	James Harden (25)	Dwight Howard (11)	James Harden (7)	Philips Arena; 13,115	23–14
38	January 11	@ Washington	W 114–107	James Harden (25)	Dwight Howard (11)	Jeremy Lin (8)	Verizon Center; 17,454	24–14
39	January 13	@ Boston	W 104–92	Dwight Howard (32)	Dwight Howard (12)	Jeremy Lin (9)	TD Garden; 17,750	25–14
40	January 15	@ New Orleans	W 103–100	James Harden (26)	Dwight Howard (11)	James Harden (7)	New Orleans Arena; 15,918	26–14
41	January 16	Oklahoma City	L 92–104	James Harden & Terrence Jones (16)	Terrence Jones (13)	James Harden (8)	Toyota Center; 18,231	26–15
42	January 18	Milwaukee	W 114–104	Terrence Jones (36)	Dwight Howard (14)	Harden, Lin & Brooks (4)	Toyota Center; 18,082	27–15
43	January 20	Portland	W 126–113	Chandler Parsons (31)	Dwight Howard (12)	Chandler Parsons (7)	Toyota Center; 18,135	28–15
44	January 22	Sacramento	W 119–98	Dwight Howard (26)	Dwight Howard (13)	James Harden (9)	Toyota Center; 16,488	29–15
45	January 24	Memphis	L 87–88	Chandler Parsons (34)	Dwight Howard (12)	James Harden (13)	Toyota Center; 16,998	29–16
46	January 25	@ Memphis	L 81–99	James Harden (16)	Dwight Howard (12)	Harden, Lin & Jones (3)	FedExForum; 17,512	29–17
47	January 28	San Antonio	W 97–90	Dwight Howard (23)	Dwight Howard (16)	Jeremy Lin (8)	Toyota Center; 18,314	30–17
48	January 29	@ Dallas	W 117–115	Chandler Parsons (26)	Donatas Motiejūnas (13)	Jeremy Lin (7)	American Airlines Center; 19,359	31–17

February : 8–2 (home: 3–0; road: 5–2)

Game	Date	Team	Score	High points	High rebounds	High assists	Location Attendance	Record
49	February 1	Cleveland	W 106–92	James Harden (28)	Jeremy Lin (11)	Jeremy Lin (10)	Toyota Center; 18,309	32–17
50	February 5	Phoenix	W 122–108	Dwight Howard (34)	Dwight Howard (14)	Chandler Parsons (6)	Toyota Center; 18,217	33–17
51	February 8	@ Milwaukee	W 101–95	Dwight Howard (27)	Dwight Howard (13)	Dwight Howard (5)	BMO Harris Bradley Center; 15,923	34–17
52	February 10	@ Minnesota	W 107–89	Chandler Parsons (20)	Dwight Howard (15)	Jeremy Lin (7)	Target Center; 12,002	35–17
53	February 12	Washington	W 113–112	James Harden (35)	Dwight Howard (16)	Harden & Parsons (6)	Toyota Center; 18,314	36–17
All-Star Break
54	February 19	@ L.A Lakers	W 134–108	James Harden (29)	Dwight Howard (13)	James Harden (11)	Staples Center; 18,997	37–17
55	February 20	@ Golden State	L 99–102	James Harden (39)	Dwight Howard (21)	Harden & Parsons (5)	Oracle Arena; 19,596	37–18
56	February 23	@ Phoenix	W 115–112	Dwight Howard (25)	Dwight Howard (9)	Harden & Parsons (7)	US Airways Center; 15,510	38–18
57	February 25	@ Sacramento	W 129–103	James Harden (43)	Dwight Howard (11)	James Harden (8)	Sleep Train Arena; 16,057	39–18
58	February 26	@ L.A Clippers	L 93–101	Dwight Howard (23)	Dwight Howard (11)	Harden, Lin & Parsons (3)	Staples Center; 19,258	39–19

March : 10–4 (home: 7–1; road: 3–3)

Game	Date	Team	Score	High points	High rebounds	High assists	Location Attendance	Record
59	March 1	Detroit	W 118–110	Terrence Jones (22)	Terrence Jones (10)	James Harden (12)	Toyota Center; 18,330	40–19
60	March 4	Miami	W 106–103	Dwight Howard (22)	Dwight Howard (16)	James Harden (11)	Toyota Center; 18,523	41–19
61	March 5	@ Orlando	W 101–89	James Harden (31)	Dwight Howard (13)	Chandler Parsons (7)	Amway Center; 16,012	42–19
62	March 7	Indiana	W 112–86	James Harden (28)	Dwight Howard (7)	Chandler Parsons (6)	Toyota Center; 18,332	43–19
63	March 9	Portland	W 118–113	James Harden (41)	Dwight Howard (12)	James Harden (6)	Toyota Center; 18,321	44–19
64	March 11	@ Oklahoma City	L 98–106	James Harden (28)	Dwight Howard (10)	James Harden (9)	Chesapeake Energy Arena; 18,203	44–20
65	March 13	@ Chicago	L 87–111	Jeremy Lin (21)	Dwight Howard (10)	Lin & Beverley (3)	United Center; 21,747	44–21
66	March 16	@ Miami	L 104–113	James Harden (30)	Dwight Howard (14)	Parsons, Howard & Beverley (5)	American Airlines Arena; 19,666	44–22
67	March 17	Utah	W 124–86	Terrence Jones (30)	Aşık & Motiejūnas (11)	Jeremy Lin (9)	Toyota Center; 18,156	45–22
68	March 20	Minnesota	W 129–106	James Harden (28)	Chandler Parsons (9)	Jeremy Lin (10)	Toyota Center; 18,315	46–22
69	March 22	@ Cleveland	W 118–111	James Harden (37)	Ömer Aşık (9)	James Harden (11)	Quicken Loans Arena; 19,058	47–22
70	March 24	@ Charlotte	W 100–89	James Harden (31)	Dwight Howard (10)	James Harden (5)	Time Warner Cable Arena; 15,511	48–22
71	March 27	Philadelphia	W 120–98	James Harden (26)	Dwight Howard (13)	James Harden (10)	Toyota Center; 18,334	49–22
72	March 29	L.A Clippers	L 107–118	James Harden (32)	Ömer Aşık (11)	James Harden (6)	Toyota Center; 18,337	49–23

April : 5–5 (home: 4–0; road: 1–5)

Game	Date	Team	Score	High points	High rebounds	High assists	Location Attendance	Record
73	April 1	@ Brooklyn	L 96–105	James Harden (26)	Ömer Aşık (23)	James Harden (7)	Barclays Center; 17,732	49–24
74	April 2	@ Toronto	L 103–107	James Harden (26)	Ömer Aşık (15)	Jeremy Lin (7)	Air Canada Centre; 18,294	49–25
75	April 4	Oklahoma City	W 111–107	James Harden (39)	Ömer Aşık (12)	James Harden (7)	Toyota Center; 18,407	50–25
76	April 6	Denver	W 130–125 (OT)	James Harden (32)	Ömer Aşık (23)	James Harden (10)	Toyota Center; 18,325	51–25
77	April 8	@ L.A Lakers	W 145–130	Harden & Jones (33)	Aşık & Motiejūnas (15)	James Harden (12)	Staples Center; 18,131	52–25
78	April 9	@ Denver	L 116–123	Jeremy Lin (18)	Ömer Aşık (12)	Harden, Lin & Canaan (6)	Pepsi Center; 15,322	52–26
79	April 11	@ Minnesota	L 110–112	James Harden (33)	Ömer Aşık (15)	James Harden (10)	Target Center; 16,689	52–27
80	April 12	New Orleans	W 111–104	James Harden (33)	Ömer Aşık (8)	James Harden (13)	Toyota Center; 18,372	53–27
81	April 14	San Antonio	W 104–98	Chandler Parsons (21)	Dwight Howard (17)	James Harden (7)	Toyota Center; 18,406	54–27
82	April 16	@ New Orleans	L 100–105	Troy Daniels (22)	Donatas Motiejūnas (10)	Troy Daniels (5)	Smoothie King Center; 17,421	54–28

2013–14 season schedule

== Playoffs ==
=== Game log ===
2014 playoff game log
Total: 2–4 (home: 1–2; road: 1–2)
First Round: 2–4 (home: 1–2; road: 1–2)

Game	Date	Team	Score	High points	High rebounds	High assists	Location Attendance	Series
1	April 20	Portland	L 120–122 (OT)	Harden, Howard (27)	Dwight Howard (15)	James Harden (6)	Toyota Center; 18,240	0–1
2	April 23	Portland	L 105–112	Dwight Howard (32)	Dwight Howard (14)	Jeremy Lin (5)	Toyota Center; 18,331	0–2
3	April 25	@ Portland	W 121–116 (OT)	James Harden (37)	Dwight Howard (14)	Harden, Lin (6)	Moda Center; 20,302	1–2
4	April 27	@ Portland	L 120–123 (OT)	James Harden (28)	Dwight Howard (14)	James Harden (6)	Moda Center; 20,246	1–3
5	April 30	Portland	W 108–98	Dwight Howard (22)	Ömer Aşık (15)	James Harden (7)	Toyota Center; 18,230	2–3
6	May 2	@ Portland	L 98–99	James Harden (34)	Chandler Parsons (12)	James Harden (6)	Moda Center; 20,204	2–4

2014 schedule

== Standings ==
Southwest Division	W	L	PCT	GB	Home	Road	Div	GP
z-San Antonio Spurs	62	20	.756	–	32‍–‍9	30‍–‍11	12–4	82
x-Houston Rockets	54	28	.659	8.0	33‍–‍8	21‍–‍20	11–5	82
x-Memphis Grizzlies	50	32	.610	12.0	27‍–‍14	23‍–‍18	4–12	82
x-Dallas Mavericks	49	33	.598	13.0	26‍–‍15	23‍–‍18	9–7	82
New Orleans Pelicans	34	48	.415	28.0	22‍–‍19	12‍–‍29	4–12	82

Western Conference
#	Team	W	L	PCT	GB	GP
1	z-San Antonio Spurs *	62	20	.756	–	82
2	y-Oklahoma City Thunder *	59	23	.720	3.0	82
3	y-Los Angeles Clippers *	57	25	.695	5.0	82
4	x-Houston Rockets	54	28	.659	8.0	82
5	x-Portland Trail Blazers	54	28	.659	8.0	82
6	x-Golden State Warriors	51	31	.622	11.0	82
7	x-Memphis Grizzlies	50	32	.610	12.0	82
8	x-Dallas Mavericks	49	33	.598	13.0	82
9	Phoenix Suns	48	34	.585	14.0	82
10	Minnesota Timberwolves	40	42	.488	22.0	82
11	Denver Nuggets	36	46	.439	26.0	82
12	New Orleans Pelicans	34	48	.415	28.0	82
13	Sacramento Kings	28	54	.341	34.0	82
14	Los Angeles Lakers	27	55	.329	35.0	82
15	Utah Jazz	25	57	.305	37.0	82

== Player statistics ==
Legend
GP	Games played	GS	Games started	MPG	Minutes per game
FG%	Field-goal percentage	3P%	3-point field-goal percentage	FT%	Free-throw percentage
RPG	Rebounds per game	APG	Assists per game	SPG	Steals per game
BPG	Blocks per game	PPG	Points per game

=== Regular season ===
Houston Rockets statistics
Player	GP	GS	MPG	FG%	3P%	FT%	RPG	APG	SPG	BPG	PPG
Terrence Jones	76	71	27.3	.542	.307	.605	6.9	1.1	.7	1.3	12.1
Chandler Parsons	74	74	37.6	.472	.370	.742	5.5	4.0	1.2	.4	16.6
James Harden	73	73	38.0	.456	.366	.866	4.7	6.1	1.6	.4	25.4
Dwight Howard	71	71	33.7	.591	.286	.547	12.2	1.8	.8	1.8	18.3
Jeremy Lin	71	33	28.9	.446	.358	.823	2.6	4.1	1.0	.4	12.5
Omri Casspi	71	2	18.1	.422	.347	.680	3.7	1.2	.6	.2	6.9
Donatas Motiejūnas	62	3	15.4	.443	.250	.604	3.6	.5	.3	.3	5.5
Patrick Beverley	56	55	31.3	.414	.361	.814	3.5	2.7	1.4	.4	10.2
Francisco García	55	4	19.7	.401	.358	.526	2.2	1.1	.5	.6	5.7
Ömer Aşık	48	19	20.2	.532		.619	7.9	.5	.3	.8	5.8
Aaron Brooks^{†}	43	0	16.7	.395	.409	.841	1.4	1.9	.6	.1	7.0
Ronnie Brewer^{†}	23	3	6.9	.200	.125	.000	.6	.4	.3	.0	.3
Isaiah Canaan	22	0	11.5	.356	.327	.724	1.1	1.0	.4	.2	4.6
Jordan Hamilton^{†}	21	1	16.6	.393	.362	.850	2.9	.9	.6	.3	6.6
Greg Smith	11	0	9.1	.643		.400	2.5	.0	.1	.2	3.5
Robert Covington	7	0	4.9	.429	.364		.7	.0	.3	.0	2.3
Troy Daniels	5	1	15.0	.484	.480		.8	1.0	.0	.0	8.4
Josh Powell	1	0	19.0	.333			5.0	.0	.0	1.0	4.0

=== Playoffs ===
Houston Rockets statistics
Player	GP	GS	MPG	FG%	3P%	FT%	RPG	APG	SPG	BPG	PPG
James Harden	6	6	43.8	.376	.296	.900	4.7	5.8	2.0	.2	26.8
Chandler Parsons	6	6	41.7	.438	.361	.733	6.8	2.3	.7	.3	19.3
Dwight Howard	6	6	38.5	.547		.625	13.7	1.8	.7	2.8	26.0
Patrick Beverley	6	6	33.7	.380	.318	.700	4.2	1.8	.5	.3	8.7
Ömer Aşık	6	4	27.2	.485		1.000	8.2	.7	.5	.7	5.8
Terrence Jones	6	2	23.0	.513	.000	.500	6.2	1.3	.8	.5	7.7
Jeremy Lin	6	0	29.5	.410	.217	.813	3.7	4.3	.5	.2	11.3
Troy Daniels	4	0	17.0	.529	.533	1.000	2.3	.3	.5	.0	7.8
Francisco García	2	0	11.0	.333	.000	.750	1.0	.0	.0	.0	3.5

- ^{†} Denotes player spent time with another team in the season. Stats reflect time with the Rockets only.

== Transactions ==
=== Additions ===
Player	Signed	Former team	Ref.
Dwight Howard	July 13, 2013	Los Angeles Lakers	
