= 2013–14 Denver Nuggets season =

NBA professional basketball team season

- Head coach: Brian Shaw
- General manager: Tim Connelly
- Owner: Stan Kroenke
- Arena: Pepsi Center

Results
- Record: 36–46 (.439)
- Place: Division: 4th (Northwest); Conference: 11th (Western)
- Playoff finish: Did not qualify
- Stats at Basketball Reference

Local media
- Television: Altitude Sports and Entertainment
- Radio: KCKK

The 2013–14 Denver Nuggets season was the 47th season of the franchise, and its 38th season in the National Basketball Association (NBA). The Nuggets struggled for much of the year, finishing with a 36–46 record, missing the playoffs for the first time in 11 years.

== Key dates ==
- May 31: GM Masai Ujiri accepts position with Toronto Raptors.
- June 6: Head coach George Karl is relieved of coaching duties.
- June 17: Tim Connelly named executive VP of basketball operations.
- June 25: Brian Shaw named head coach.
- June 27: The 2013 NBA draft took place at Barclays Center in Brooklyn, New York.

== Draft ==
Round	Pick	Player	Position	Nationality	School/Club team
2	46	Erick Green ^{[1]}	PG	USA	Virginia Tech
2	55	Joffrey Lauvergne ^{[2]}	C	France	Partizan Belgrade

- ^{1} Acquired from the Utah Jazz.
- ^{2} Acquired from the Memphis Grizzlies.

== Roster ==
2013–14 Denver Nuggets roster
Players

Pos.	No.	Player	Height	Weight	DOB	From
F	00	Darrell Arthur	6 ft 9 in (2.06 m)	235 lb (107 kg)	1988–03–25	Kansas
G	0	Aaron Brooks	6 ft 0 in (1.83 m)	161 lb (73 kg)	1985–01–14	Oregon
F	21	Wilson Chandler	6 ft 8 in (2.03 m)	225 lb (102 kg)	1987–05–10	DePaul
F	35	Kenneth Faried	6 ft 8 in (2.03 m)	228 lb (103 kg)	1989–11–18	Morehead State
G	94	Evan Fournier	6 ft 6 in (1.98 m)	200 lb (91 kg)	1992–10–29	France
G	4	Randy Foye	6 ft 4 in (1.93 m)	213 lb (97 kg)	1983–09–24	Villanova
F	8	Danilo Gallinari (injured)	6 ft 10 in (2.08 m)	225 lb (102 kg)	1988–08–08	Italy
F/C	7	JJ Hickson	6 ft 9 in (2.06 m)	242 lb (110 kg)	1988–09–04	NC State
G	3	Ty Lawson	5 ft 11 in (1.80 m)	195 lb (88 kg)	1987–11–03	North Carolina
C	34	JaVale McGee (injured)	7 ft 0 in (2.13 m)	250 lb (113 kg)	1988–01–19	Nevada
F	30	Quincy Miller	6 ft 9 in (2.06 m)	210 lb (95 kg)	1992–11–18	Baylor
C	25	Timofey Mozgov	7 ft 1 in (2.16 m)	250 lb (113 kg)	1986–07–16	Russia
F/C	15	Anthony Randolph	6 ft 11 in (2.11 m)	225 lb (102 kg)	1989–07–15	LSU
G	10	Nate Robinson (injured)	5 ft 9 in (1.75 m)	180 lb (82 kg)	1984–05–31	Washington
F	24	Jan Veselý	7 ft 0 in (2.13 m)	242 lb (110 kg)	1990–04–24	Czech Republic

Coaches
Head coach
- Brian Shaw
Assistant(s)
- Lester Conner
- Melvin Hunt
- Patrick Mutombo

Legend
- (DP) Unsigned draft pick
- (FA) Free agent
- (S) Suspended
- (DL) On assignment to D-League affiliate
- Injured

Roster
Updated: 2014–02–20

== Pre-season ==
2013 pre-season game log
Total: 2–5 (Home: 1–1; Road: 1–4)
Pre-season: 2–5 (home: 1–1; road: 1–4)

Game	Date	Team	Score	High points	High rebounds	High assists	Location Attendance	Record
1	October 6	@ L.A. Lakers	W 97–88	Lawson & Hamilton (15)	Ty Lawson (10)	Ty Lawson (6)	Staples Center; 16,722	1–0
2	October 8	@ L.A. Lakers	L 88–90	JaVale McGee (14)	Faried & Hickson (10)	Lawson & Fournier (5)	Citizens Business Bank Arena; 6,023	1–1
3	October 14	San Antonio	W 98–94	Kenneth Faried (22)	Kenneth Faried (9)	Ty Lawson (8)	Pepsi Center; 14,671	2–1
4	October 15	@ Oklahoma City	L 81–109	Robinson & Miller (10)	JaVale McGee (8)	Ty Lawson (4)	Chesapeake Energy Arena; 18,203	2–2
5	October 19	@ L.A. Clippers	L 111–118 (OT)	Randolph & Fournier (16)	Evan Fournier (7)	Quincy Miller (7)	Mandalay Bay Events Center; 9,535	2–3
6	October 23	Phoenix	L 79–98	Anthony Randolph (15)	J. J. Hickson (7)	Ty Lawson (8)	Pepsi Center; 14,652	2–4
7	October 25	@ Chicago	L 89–94	Randolph & McGee (15)	JaVale McGee (8)	Nate Robinson (5)	United Center; 21,773	2–5

2013–14 season schedule

== Regular season ==
=== Standings ===
Northwest Division	W	L	PCT	GB	Home	Road	Div	GP
y-Oklahoma City Thunder	59	23	.720	–	34‍–‍7	25‍–‍16	11–5	82
x-Portland Trail Blazers	54	28	.659	5.0	31‍–‍10	23‍–‍18	13–3	82
Minnesota Timberwolves	40	42	.488	19.0	24‍–‍17	16‍–‍25	7–9	82
Denver Nuggets	36	46	.439	23.0	22‍–‍19	14‍–‍27	5–11	82
Utah Jazz	25	57	.305	34.0	16‍–‍25	9‍–‍32	4–12	82

Western Conference
#	Team	W	L	PCT	GB	GP
1	z-San Antonio Spurs *	62	20	.756	–	82
2	y-Oklahoma City Thunder *	59	23	.720	3.0	82
3	y-Los Angeles Clippers *	57	25	.695	5.0	82
4	x-Houston Rockets	54	28	.659	8.0	82
5	x-Portland Trail Blazers	54	28	.659	8.0	82
6	x-Golden State Warriors	51	31	.622	11.0	82
7	x-Memphis Grizzlies	50	32	.610	12.0	82
8	x-Dallas Mavericks	49	33	.598	13.0	82
9	Phoenix Suns	48	34	.585	14.0	82
10	Minnesota Timberwolves	40	42	.488	22.0	82
11	Denver Nuggets	36	46	.439	26.0	82
12	New Orleans Pelicans	34	48	.415	28.0	82
13	Sacramento Kings	28	54	.341	34.0	82
14	Los Angeles Lakers	27	55	.329	35.0	82
15	Utah Jazz	25	57	.305	37.0	82

=== Game log ===
2013–14 game log
Total: 36–46 (Home: 22–19; Road: 14–27)
October: 0–1 (home: 0–0; road: 0–1)

Game	Date	Team	Score	High points	High rebounds	High assists	Location Attendance	Record
1	October 30	@ Sacramento	L 88–90	Ty Lawson (20)	J. J. Hickson (9)	Ty Lawson (8)	Sleep Train Arena; 17,317	0–1

November: 9–5 (home: 6–2; road: 3–3)

Game	Date	Team	Score	High points	High rebounds	High assists	Location Attendance	Record
2	November 1	Portland	L 98–113	Nate Robinson (24)	Kenneth Faried (11)	Ty Lawson (6)	Pepsi Center; 19,155	0–2
3	November 5	San Antonio	L 94–102	Ty Lawson (20)	Kenneth Faried (8)	Ty Lawson (8)	Pepsi Center; 15,721	0–3
4	November 7	Atlanta	W 109–107	Ty Lawson (23)	Kenneth Faried (9)	Ty Lawson (8)	Pepsi Center; 15,404	1–3
5	November 8	@ Phoenix	L 103–114	Ty Lawson (29)	Jordan Hamilton (9)	Foye, Lawson, Miller (4)	US Airways Center; 15,145	1–4
6	November 11	@ Utah	W 100–81	Ty Lawson (17)	Kenneth Faried (13)	Ty Lawson (10)	EnergySolutions Arena; 16,866	2–4
7	November 13	L.A. Lakers	W 111–99	Timofey Mozgov (23)	Kenneth Faried (13)	Ty Lawson (7)	Pepsi Center; 17,824	3–4
8	November 15	Minnesota	W 117–113	Wilson Chandler (19)	J. J. Hickson (11)	Ty Lawson (10)	Pepsi Center; 17,142	4–4
9	November 16	@ Houston	L 111–122	Ty Lawson (28)	Faried & Mozgov (10)	Ty Lawson (17)	Toyota Center; 18,147	4–5
10	November 18	@ Oklahoma City	L 113–115	Ty Lawson (29)	J. J. Hickson (19)	Ty Lawson (8)	Chesapeake Energy Arena; 18,203	4–6
11	November 21	Chicago	W 97–87	Jordan Hamilton (17)	Kenneth Faried (11)	Ty Lawson (7)	Pepsi Center; 18,423	5–6
12	November 23	Dallas	W 102–100	Ty Lawson (20)	Kenneth Faried (14)	Ty Lawson (9)	Pepsi Center; 17,841	6–6
13	November 25	@ Dallas	W 110–96	J. J. Hickson (22)	Kenneth Faried (10)	Ty Lawson (11)	American Airlines Center; 19,677	7–6
14	November 27	@ Minnesota	W 117–110	Ty Lawson (23)	Timofey Mozgov (8)	Andre Miller (6)	Target Center; 14,244	8–6
15	November 29	New York	W 97–95	Ty Lawson (22)	J. J. Hickson (11)	Ty Lawson (8)	Pepsi Center; 19,155	9–6

December: 5–10 (home: 1–5; road: 4–5)

Game	Date	Team	Score	High points	High rebounds	High assists	Location Attendance	Record
16	December 1	@ Toronto	W 112–98	Nate Robinson (23)	Timofey Mozgov (15)	Andre Miller (7)	Air Canada Centre; 16,290	10–6
17	December 3	@ Brooklyn	W 111–87	Timofey Mozgov (17)	Timofey Mozgov (20)	Andre Miller (7)	Barclays Center; 17,732	11–6
18	December 4	@ Cleveland	L 88–98	Randy Foye (16)	J. J. Hickson (11)	Ty Lawson (11)	Quicken Loans Arena; 14,642	11–7
19	December 6	@ Boston	L 98–106	Ty Lawson (20)	Wilson Chandler (8)	Ty Lawson (4)	TD Garden; 17,263	11–8
20	December 7	@ Philadelphia	W 103–92	Nate Robinson (20)	J. J. Hickson (10)	Andre Miller (7)	Wells Fargo Center; 13,113	12–8
21	December 9	@ Washington	W 75–74	Wilson Chandler (17)	Wilson Chandler (8)	Randy Foye (5)	Verizon Center; 13,293	13–8
22	December 13	Utah	L 93–103	Wilson Chandler (17)	Kenneth Faried (9)	Andre Miller (7)	Pepsi Center; 15,616	13–9
23	December 15	New Orleans	W 102–93	Wilson Chandler (19)	J. J. Hickson (11)	Ty Lawson (8)	Pepsi Center; 15,111	14–9
24	December 17	Oklahoma City	L 93–105	J. J. Hickson (20)	J. J. Hickson (14)	Ty Lawson (13)	Pepsi Center; 17,035	14–10
25	December 20	Phoenix	L 99–103	Wilson Chandler (15)	J. J. Hickson (14)	Ty Lawson (7)	Pepsi Center; 15,974	14–11
26	December 21	@ L.A. Clippers	L 91–112	Wilson Chandler (19)	J. J. Hickson (9)	Ty Lawson (6)	Staples Center; 19,129	14–12
27	December 23	Golden State	L 81–89	Ty Lawson (16)	Timofey Mozgov (11)	Andre Miller (8)	Pepsi Center; 18,551	14–13
28	December 27	@ New Orleans	L 89–105	Wilson Chandler (22)	J.J. Hickson (10)	Ty Lawson (12)	New Orleans Arena; 18,089	14–14
29	December 28	@ Memphis	L 99–120	Ty Lawson (20)	J.J. Hickson (6)	Ty Lawson (8)	FedExForum; 17,017	14–15
30	December 30	Miami	L 94–97	Ty Lawson (26)	J.J. Hickson (11)	Ty Lawson, Randy Foye (7)	Pepsi Center; 19,155	14–16

January: 8–7 (home: 5–4; road: 3–3)

Game	Date	Team	Score	High points	High rebounds	High assists	Location Attendance	Record
31	January 1	Philadelphia	L 102–114	J.J. Hickson (19)	J.J. Hickson (11)	Ty Lawson (11)	Pepsi Center; 16,006	14–17
32	January 3	Memphis	W 111–108	Ty Lawson (18)	Randy Foye, Timofey Mozgov (7)	Ty Lawson (12)	Pepsi Center; 17,608	15–17
33	January 5	@ L.A. Lakers	W 137–115	Nate Robinson (21)	Kenneth Faried (13)	Ty Lawson (12)	Staples Center; 18,997	16–17
34	January 7	Boston	W 129–98	Randy Foye (23)	Kenneth Faried (13)	Ty Lawson (13)	Pepsi Center; 16,224	17–17
35	January 9	Oklahoma City	W 111–88	Randy Foye (24)	Kenneth Faried (14)	Ty Lawson (14)	Pepsi Center; 17,315	18–17
36	January 11	Orlando	W 120–94	Randy Foye & Evan Fournier (18)	Quincy Miller (11)	Ty Lawson (8)	Pepsi Center; 17,947	19–17
37	January 13	@ Utah	L 103–118	Ty Lawson (23)	J.J. Hickson (10)	Ty Lawson (11)	EnergySolutions Arena; 17,232	19–18
38	January 15	@ Golden State	W 123–116	Nate Robinson (24)	J.J. Hickson (24)	Ty Lawson (11)	Oracle Arena; 19,596	20–18
39	January 17	Cleveland	L 109–117	Wilson Chandler (23)	Timofey Mozgov (11)	Ty Lawson (11)	Pepsi Center; 18,486	20–19
40	January 19	@ Phoenix	L 103–117	Anthony Randolph (19)	J.J. Hickson (13)	Ty Lawson (14)	US Airways Center; 16,211	20–20
41	January 23	@ Portland	L 105–110	Wilson Chandler (18)	J.J. Hickson (7)	Ty Lawson (11)	Moda Center; 20,066	20–21
42	January 25	Indiana	W 109–96	Wilson Chandler (25)	J.J. Hickson (13)	Ty Lawson (10)	Pepsi Center; 19,155	21–21
43	January 26	@ Sacramento	W 125–117	Ty Lawson (27)	Kenneth Faried (11)	Nate Robinson (8)	Sleep Train Arena; 15,939	22–21
44	January 29	Charlotte	L 98–101	Randy Foye (33)	Timofey Mozgov (14)	Randy Foye (7)	Pepsi Center; 16,151	22–22
45	January 31	Toronto	L 90–100	J.J. Hickson (18)	J.J. Hickson (13)	Randy Foye (16)	Pepsi Center; 17,131	22–23

February: 3–9 (home: 2–4; road: 1–5)

Game	Date	Team	Score	High points	High rebounds	High assists	Location Attendance	Record
46	February 3	L.A. Clippers	W 116–115	Kenneth Faried (28)	J.J. Hickson (12)	J.J. Hickson (5)	Pepsi Center; 16,567	23–23
47	February 5	Milwaukee	W 110–100	Wilson Chandler (24)	J.J. Hickson (10)	Ty Lawson (13)	Pepsi Center; 15,122	24–23
48	February 7	@ New York	L 90–117	Ty Lawson (24)	Wilson Chandler (7)	Ty Lawson (7)	Madison Square Garden; 19,812	24–24
49	February 8	@ Detroit	L 109–126	Randy Foye (25)	J.J. Hickson (16)	Ty Lawson (7)	Palace of Auburn Hills; 15,870	24–25
50	February 10	@ Indiana	L 80–119	Wilson Chandler (17)	J.J. Hickson (8)	Randy Foye (10)	Bankers Life Fieldhouse; 16,124	24–26
51	February 12	@ Minnesota	L 90–117	Jordan Hamilton (16)	J.J. Hickson (13)	Jordan Hamilton (7)	Target Center; 12,139	24–27
All-Star Break
52	February 18	Phoenix	L 107–112	Evan Fournier (25)	Timofey Mozgov (11)	Randy Foye (5)	Pepsi Center; 16,461	24–28
53	February 20	@ Milwaukee	W 101–90	Kenneth Faried (26)	J.J. Hickson (10)	Randy Foye (10)	BMO Harris Bradley Center; 11,186	25–28
54	February 21	@ Chicago	L 89–117	Randy Foye (23)	Timofey Mozgov (9)	Randolph & Foye (3)	United Center; 21,621	25–29
55	February 23	Sacramento	L 95–109	Foye & Fournier (27)	Hickson, Faried & Foye (6)	Aaron Brooks (8)	Pepsi Center; 16,263	25–30
56	February 25	Portland	L 95–100	Randy Foye (17)	J.J. Hickson (25)	Aaron Brooks (6)	Pepsi Center; 16,058	25–31
57	February 27	Brooklyn	L 89–112	Randy Foye (14)	Faried & Mozgov (8)	Evan Fournier (5)	Pepsi Center; 14,826	25–32

March: 7–10 (home: 5–3; road: 2–7)

Game	Date	Team	Score	High points	High rebounds	High assists	Location Attendance	Record
58	March 1	@ Portland	L 96–102	Faried, Foye & Fournier (16)	Kenneth Faried (10)	Foye & Fournier (4)	Moda Center; 20,068	25–33
59	March 3	Minnesota	L 128–132	Ty Lawson (31)	Wilson Chandler (10)	Ty Lawson (11)	Pepsi Center; 15,240	25–34
60	March 5	Dallas	W 115–110	Wilson Chandler (21)	Timofey Mozgov (10)	Ty Lawson (7)	Pepsi Center; 14,541	26–34
61	March 7	L.A. Lakers	W 134–126	Kenneth Faried (32)	Kenneth Faried (13)	Ty Lawson (17)	Pepsi Center; 18,248	27–34
62	March 9	@ New Orleans	L 107–111	Kenneth Faried (22)	Kenneth Faried (14)	Ty Lawson (12)	Smoothie King Center; 17,115	27–35
63	March 10	@ Charlotte	L 98–105	Ty Lawson (24)	Kenneth Faried (9)	Ty Lawson (6)	Time Warner Cable Arena; 14,312	27–36
64	March 12	@ Orlando	W 120–112	Kenneth Faried (26)	Wilson Chandler (10)	Ty Lawson (12)	Amway Center; 16,097	28–36
65	March 14	@ Miami	W 111–107	Kenneth Faried (24)	Kenneth Faried (10)	Ty Lawson (9)	American Airlines Arena; 19,600	29–36
66	March 15	@ Atlanta	L 92–97	Kenneth Faried (25)	J.J. Hickson (10)	Ty Lawson (11)	Philips Arena; 16,921	29–37
67	March 17	L.A. Clippers	W 110–100	J.J. Hickson (21)	Kenneth Faried (16)	Brooks, Foye & Lawson (5)	Pepsi Center; 16,553	30–37
68	March 19	Detroit	W 118–109	Aaron Brooks (21)	J.J. Hickson (11)	Aaron Brooks (17)	Pepsi Center; 16,671	31–37
69	March 21	@ Dallas	L 106–122	J.J. Hickson (18)	J.J. Hickson (8)	Ty Lawson (9)	American Airlines Center; 20,188	31–38
70	March 23	Washington	W 105–102	Kenneth Faried (20)	Kenneth Faried (8)	Ty Lawson (8)	Pepsi Center; 18,324	32–38
71	March 24	@ Oklahoma City	L 96–117	Ty Lawson (25)	Kenneth Faried (11)	Ty Lawson (7)	Chesapeake Energy Arena; 18,203	32–39
72	March 26	@ San Antonio	L 103–108	Aaron Brooks (25)	Timofey Mozgov (11)	Aaron Brooks (8)	AT&T Center; 17,949	32–40
73	March 28	San Antonio	L 102–133	Randy Foye (20)	Kenneth Faried (13)	Ty Lawson (5)	Pepsi Center; 19,155	32–41
74	March 31	Memphis	L 92–94	Timofey Mozgov (23)	Timofey Mozgov (10)	Brooks & Lawson (6)	Pepsi Center; 14,570	32–42

April: 4–4 (home: 3–1; road: 1–3)

Game	Date	Team	Score	High points	High rebounds	High assists	Location Attendance	Record
75	April 2	New Orleans	W 137–107	Kenneth Faried (34)	Kenneth Faried (13)	Ty Lawson (12)	Pepsi Center; 14,783	33–42
76	April 4	@ Memphis	L 92–100	Randy Foye (21)	Kenneth Faried (12)	Randy Foye (4)	FedExForum; 17,011	33–43
77	April 6	@ Houston	L 125–130 (OT)	Evan Fournier (26)	Kenneth Faried (13)	Aaron Brooks (15)	Toyota Center; 18,325	33–44
78	April 9	Houston	W 123–116	Randy Foye (30)	Kenneth Faried (9)	Randy Foye (15)	Pepsi Center; 15,322	34–44
79	April 10	@ Golden State	W 100–99	Timofey Mozgov (93)	Timofey Mozgov (29)	Brooks & Foye (7)	Oracle Arena; 19,596	35–44
80	April 12	Utah	W 101–94	Randy Foye (26)	Kenneth Faried (21)	Randy Foye (6)	Pepsi Center; 18,832	36–44
81	April 15	@ L.A. Clippers	L 105–117	Kenneth Faried (21)	Timofey Mozgov (11)	Randy Foye (7)	Staples Center; 19,330	36–45
82	April 16	Golden State	L 112–116	Randy Foye (32)	Kenneth Faried (13)	Randy Foye (11)	Pepsi Center; 17,232	36–46

2013–14 season schedule

== Player statistics ==
Legend
GP	Games played	GS	Games started	MPG	Minutes per game
FG%	Field-goal percentage	3P%	3-point field-goal percentage	FT%	Free-throw percentage
RPG	Rebounds per game	APG	Assists per game	SPG	Steals per game
BPG	Blocks per game	PPG	Points per game

=== Regular season ===
Player	GP	GS	MPG	FG%	3P%	FT%	RPG	APG	SPG	BPG	PPG
Darrell Arthur	68	1	17.1	.395	.375	.850	3.1	.9	.57	.69	5.9
Aaron Brooks^{a}	29	12	29.0	.406	.362	.900	2.7	5.2	.93	.24	11.9
Wilson Chandler	62	55	31.1	.416	.348	.720	4.7	1.8	.74	.50	13.6
Kenneth Faried	80	77	27.2	.545	.000	.650	8.6	1.2	.88	.86	13.7
Evan Fournier	76	4	19.8	.419	.376	.760	2.7	1.5	.45	.09	8.4
Randy Foye	81	78	30.7	.413	.380	.850	2.9	3.5	.83	.48	13.2
Jordan Hamilton^{a}	39	11	17.2	.390	.349	.740	3.4	.9	.79	.33	6.8
JJ Hickson	69	52	26.9	.508	.000	.520	9.2	1.4	.68	.74	11.8
Ty Lawson	62	61	35.8	.431	.356	.800	3.5	8.8	1.61	.16	17.6
JaVale McGee	5	5	16.0	.447	.000	1.000	3.4	.4	.20	1.40	7.0
Andre Miller^{a}	30	2	19.0	.458	.500	.740	2.4	3.3	.50	.23	5.9
Quincy Miller	52	16	15.2	.367	.319	.710	2.8	.5	.42	.62	4.9
Timofey Mozgov	82	30	21.6	.523	.167	.750	6.4	.8	.33	1.22	9.4
Anthony Randolph	43	5	12.3	.386	.295	.750	2.8	.7	.60	.44	4.8
Nate Robinson	44	1	19.7	.428	.377	.840	1.8	2.5	.82	.09	10.4
Jan Vesely^{a}	21	0	14.6	.506	.000	.420	3.7	.5	1.29	.76	4.4

^{a} Statistics with the Denver Nuggets.

== Transactions ==
=== Trades ===
June 27, 2013

To Denver Nuggets

(United States) Erick Green
Cash considerations

To Utah Jazz

(France) Rudy Gobert

June 27, 2013

To Denver Nuggets

(United States) Darrell Arthur
(France) Joffrey Lauvergne

To Memphis Grizzlies

(United States) Kosta Koufos

July 10, 2013
Three–team trade
To Utah Jazz

(Soviet Union) / (Latvia) Andris Biedrins (from Golden State)
(United States) Richard Jefferson (from Golden State)
(United States) Brandon Rush (from Golden State)
two first-round picks (from Golden State)
three-second-round picks (from Golden State)
second round-pick (from Denver Nuggets)
Cash considerations

To Golden State Warriors

Andre Iguodala (from Denver) *sign and trade
Kevin Murphy (from Utah)

To Denver Nuggets

(United States) Randy Foye (from Utah)
second round-pick (from Golden State)

February 20, 2014

To Denver Nuggets

(United States) Aaron Brooks

To Houston Rockets

(United States) Jordan Hamilton

February 20, 2014
Three–team trade
To Washington Wizards

(United States) Andre Miller (from Denver)

To Philadelphia 76ers

(United States) Eric Maynor (from Washington)
second round-pick (from Denver)
second round-pick (from Washington)

To Denver Nuggets

(Czech Republic) Jan Veselý (from Washington)

=== Free agents ===
==== Additions ====
Player	Signed	Former Team
J.J. Hickson	3 years, $15 million	Portland Trail Blazers

==== Subtractions ====
Player	Reason Left	New Team
Corey Brewer	Free Agent	Minnesota Timberwolves
