= 2013–14 Oklahoma City Thunder season =

NBA professional basketball team season

- Division champions
- Head coach: Scott Brooks
- General manager: Sam Presti
- Owners: Professional Basketball Club LLC
- Arena: Chesapeake Energy Arena

Results
- Record: 59–23 (.720)
- Place: Division: 1st (Northwest); Conference: 2nd (Western)
- Playoff finish: Western Conference Finals (lost to Spurs 2–4)
- Stats at Basketball Reference

Local media
- Television: Fox Sports Oklahoma
- Radio: KWPN; WWLS-FM

The 2013–14 Oklahoma City Thunder season was the sixth season of the franchise in Oklahoma City and the 48th in the National Basketball Association (NBA). Despite Russell Westbrook missing 36 games during the season, the Thunder managed to finish the season with a 59–23 record, earning them the second seed in the Western Conference. Kevin Durant won the MVP Award.

In the playoffs, the Thunder faced the Memphis Grizzlies, the team that defeated them in five games in the previous season's semifinals, in the First Round and won in seven games, then defeated the Los Angeles Clippers in six games during the semifinals, before losing to the eventual NBA champion San Antonio Spurs in six games during the conference finals.

== Previous season ==
The Thunder finished the 2012–13 season 60–22 to finish in first place in the Northwest Division, first in the Western Conference, and qualified for the playoffs. That season, Russell Westbrook tore his lateral meniscus following a collision with Patrick Beverley in Game 2 against the Houston Rockets in the first round. The Thunder ended up defeating the Rockets in six games before falling to the Memphis Grizzlies in the second round in five games.

== Offseason ==
=== Draft picks ===
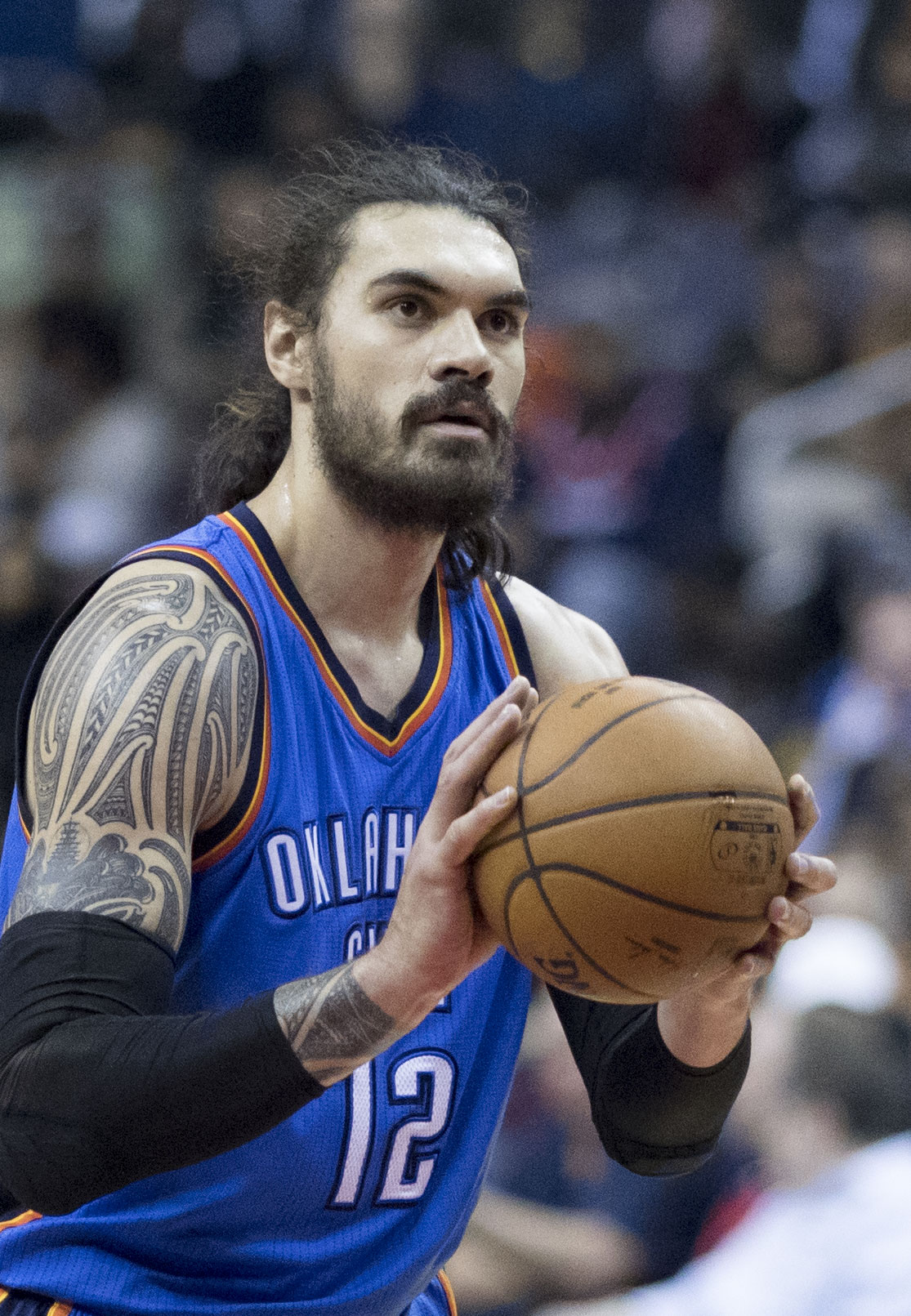
Steven Adams

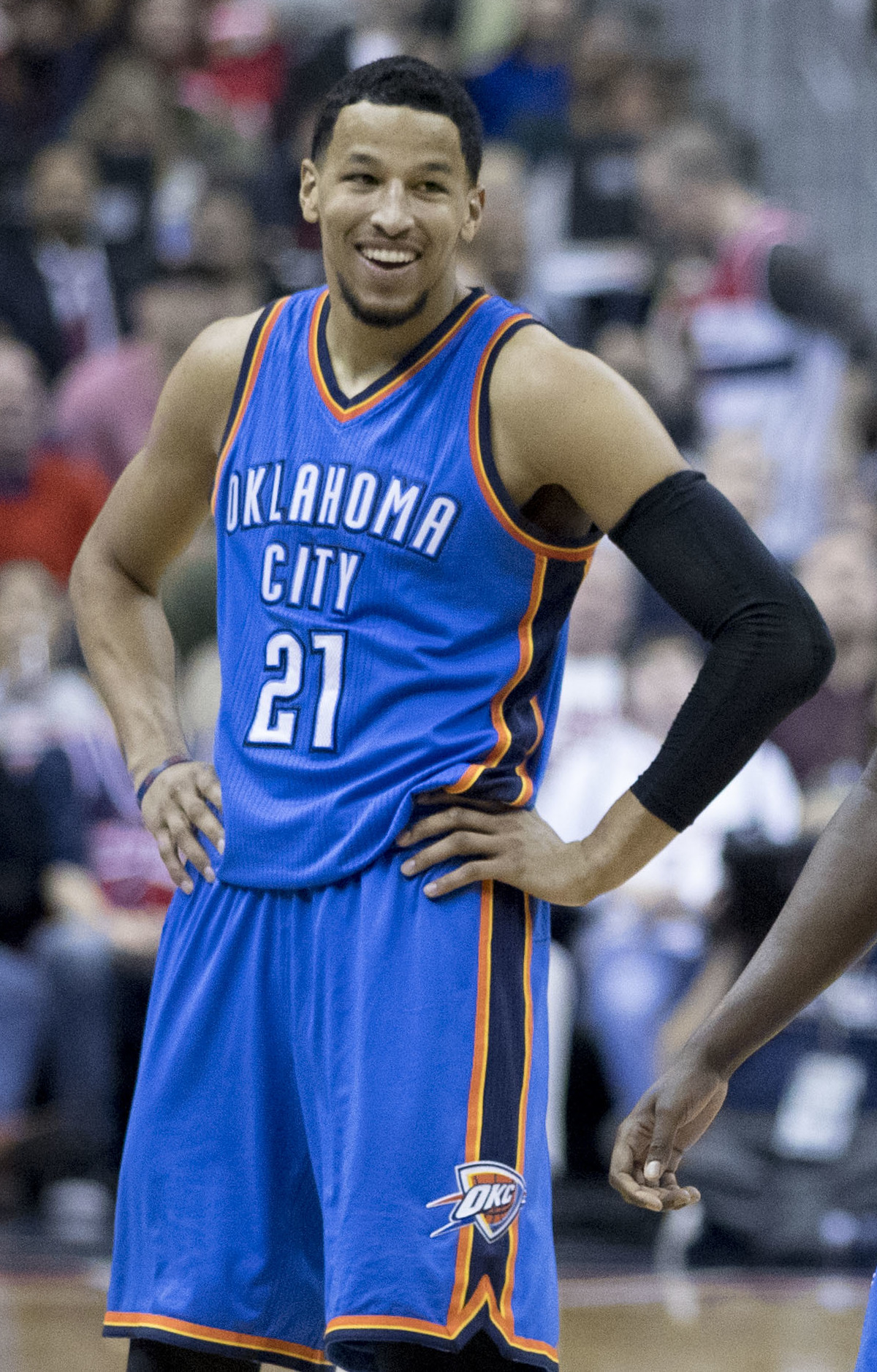
Andre Roberson

Round	Pick	Player	Position	Nationality	College/club team
1	12	Steven Adams	C	New Zealand	Pittsburgh
1	29	Archie Goodwin	SG	United States	Kentucky
2	32	Alex Abrines	SG	Spain	FC Barcelona
Andre Roberson and Grant Jerrett were later traded to the Thunder

The Thunder had two first-round picks and one second-round pick entering the draft. The Thunder held their original first-round pick that ended up as the 29th pick. The 12th pick, which was originally owned by the Toronto Raptors and acquired from the Houston Rockets in 2012 as an exchange for James Harden, was conveyed to the Thunder because it fell within its unprotected 4th-to-14th range following the NBA draft lottery. Toronto had a 2.5% chance to retain the pick and move into the top three. The Thunder also acquired a second-round pick originally owned by the Charlotte Bobcats from the Harden trade that ended up as the 32nd pick. The Thunder traded their 2013 second-round pick in the Robert Vaden trade back in 2011.

On draft night, the Thunder traded the draft rights to Archie Goodwin, the 29th pick, and cash considerations to the Golden State Warriors in exchange for the draft rights to Andre Roberson, the 26th pick. The Thunder also traded for the draft rights to Grant Jerrett, the 40th pick, from the Portland Trail Blazers in exchange for cash considerations.

The Thunder ended 2013 NBA draft night with Pittsburgh center Steven Adams, Colorado guard Andre Roberson, FC Barcelona guard Alex Abrines and Arizona forward Grant Jerrett.

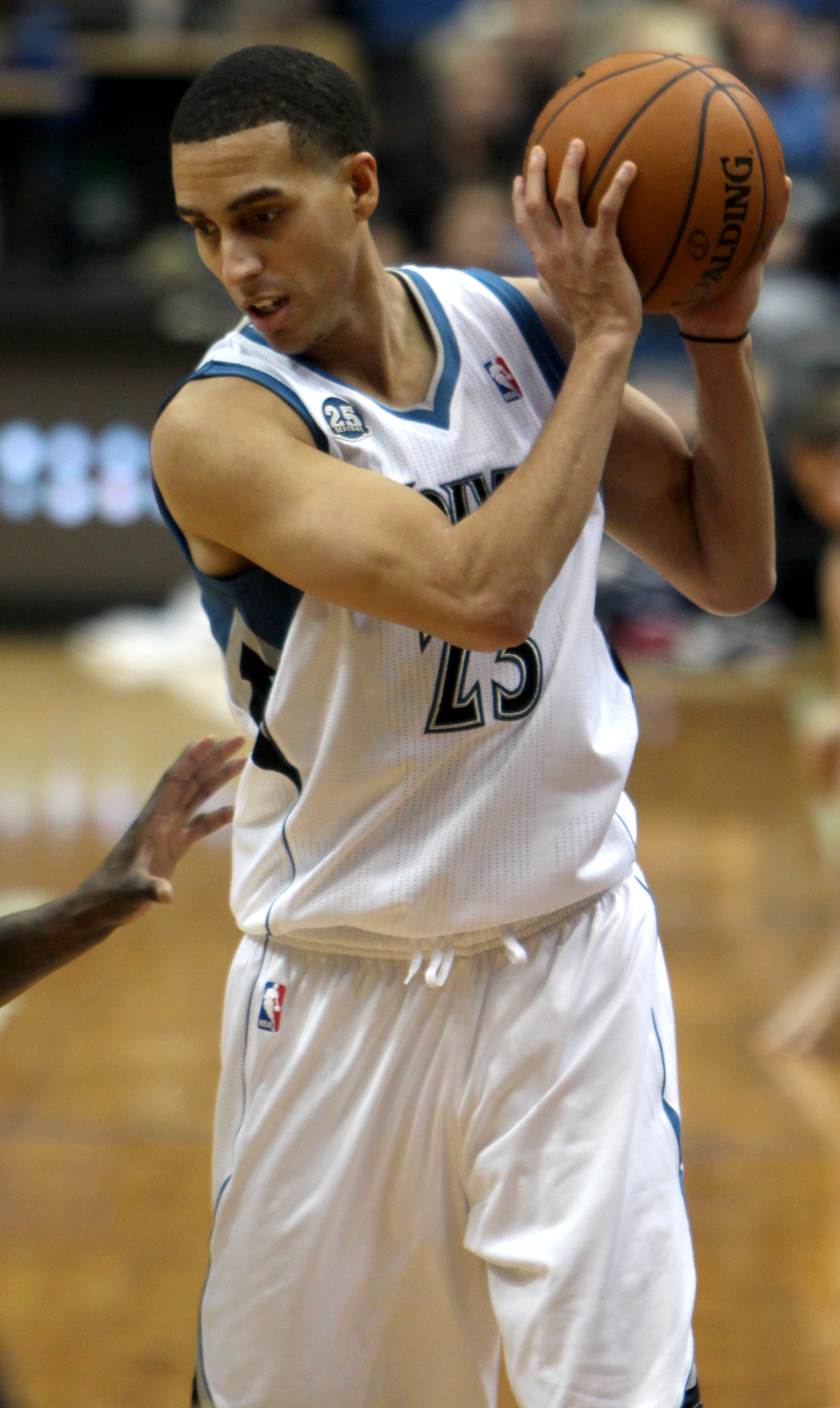
Kevin Martin was signed-and-traded to the Minnesota Timberwolves.

=== Trades ===
On June 27, the Thunder traded the draft rights to Archie Goodwin, the 29th pick, and cash considerations to the Golden State Warriors in exchange for Andre Roberson, the 26th pick. The same day, the Thunder traded cash considerations to the Portland Trail Blazers in exchange for Grant Jerrett, the 40th pick.

On July 11, the Thunder signed-and-traded Kevin Martin and cash considerations to the Minnesota Timberwolves in a three-team trade, for the draft rights to Szymon Szewczyk from Milwaukee. The Thunder also generated a trade exception worth $7 million.

=== Free agency ===
For this offseason, free agency began on July 1, 2013, while the July moratorium ended on July 10. Ronnie Brewer, Derek Fisher and Kevin Martin were set to hit unrestricted free agency. On July 2, it was reported that Kevin Martin agreed to a four-year, $28 million deal with the Minnesota Timberwolves, which he later signed nine days later. The Thunder negotiated a sign-and-trade to generate a trade exception. On July 24, Derek Fisher agreed to a new contract to stay with the Thunder. Sam Presti called Fisher "a valuable member of our team and we are excited to have him back. He has such a positive impact on his teammates and the organization.” On August 28, Ronnie Brewer signed a deal with the Houston Rockets.

On August 7, Ryan Gomes signed a deal with the Thunder. Gomes spent seven season in the NBA before playing internationally with the Artland Dragons in the ProA league.

=== Front office and coaching changes ===
On May 15, Thunder assistant Maurice Cheeks was hired as the head coach of the Detroit Pistons. Cheeks served as an assistant coach for the Thunder for four seasons. Cheeks helped guide the Thunder to four playoff appearances, a finals appearance and an overall 212-100 (.707) record.

On July 31, the Thunder announced Robert Pack and Mike Terpstra as assistant coaches. Pack joins the Thunder after serving three seasons as the assistant coach of the Los Angeles Clippers. Terpstra joined the Thunder after 20 years of experience in different capacities at the college, junior college, and high school levels, with additional experience in the NBA Development League and the CBA.

== Roster ==
2013–14 Oklahoma City Thunder roster
Players

Pos.	No.	Player	Height	Weight	DOB	From
C	12	Steven Adams	7 ft 0 in (2.13 m)	250 lb (113 kg)	1993-07-20	Pittsburgh
SF	2	Caron Butler	6 ft 7 in (2.01 m)	228 lb (103 kg)	1980-03-13	Connecticut
PF	4	Nick Collison	6 ft 10 in (2.08 m)	255 lb (116 kg)	1980-10-26	Kansas
SF	35	Kevin Durant	6 ft 9 in (2.06 m)	240 lb (109 kg)	1988-09-29	Texas
SG	6	Derek Fisher	6 ft 1 in (1.85 m)	210 lb (95 kg)	1974-08-09	Little Rock
PF	9	Serge Ibaka	6 ft 10 in (2.08 m)	245 lb (111 kg)	1989-09-18	Republic of the Congo
PG	15	Reggie Jackson	6 ft 3 in (1.91 m)	208 lb (94 kg)	1990-04-16	Boston College
PF	7	Grant Jerrett	6 ft 10 in (2.08 m)	232 lb (105 kg)	1993-07-08	Arizona
PF	3	Perry Jones III	6 ft 11 in (2.11 m)	235 lb (107 kg)	1991-09-24	Baylor
SG	11	Jeremy Lamb	6 ft 5 in (1.96 m)	185 lb (84 kg)	1992-05-30	Connecticut
C	5	Kendrick Perkins	6 ft 10 in (2.08 m)	270 lb (122 kg)	1984-11-10	Clifton J. Ozen HS (TX)
SG	21	André Roberson	6 ft 7 in (2.01 m)	210 lb (95 kg)	1991-12-04	Colorado
SG	25	Thabo Sefolosha	6 ft 7 in (2.01 m)	222 lb (101 kg)	1984-05-02	Switzerland
C	34	Hasheem Thabeet	7 ft 3 in (2.21 m)	263 lb (119 kg)	1987-02-16	Connecticut
PG	0	Russell Westbrook	6 ft 3 in (1.91 m)	200 lb (91 kg)	1988-11-12	UCLA

Coaches
Head coach
- Scott Brooks
Assistant(s)
- Mark Bryant
- Rex Kalamian
- Brian Keefe
- Robert Pack
- Mike Terpstra

Legend
- (DP) Unsigned draft pick
- (FA) Free agent
- (S) Suspended
- (DL) On assignment to D-League affiliate
- Injured

Roster
Updated: April 7, 2014

=== Roster notes ===
- Thabo Sefolosha changed his jersey number to #25.

== Standings ==
=== Conference ===
Western Conference
#	Team	W	L	PCT	GB	GP
1	z-San Antonio Spurs *	62	20	.756	–	82
2	y-Oklahoma City Thunder *	59	23	.720	3.0	82
3	y-Los Angeles Clippers *	57	25	.695	5.0	82
4	x-Houston Rockets	54	28	.659	8.0	82
5	x-Portland Trail Blazers	54	28	.659	8.0	82
6	x-Golden State Warriors	51	31	.622	11.0	82
7	x-Memphis Grizzlies	50	32	.610	12.0	82
8	x-Dallas Mavericks	49	33	.598	13.0	82
9	Phoenix Suns	48	34	.585	14.0	82
10	Minnesota Timberwolves	40	42	.488	22.0	82
11	Denver Nuggets	36	46	.439	26.0	82
12	New Orleans Pelicans	34	48	.415	28.0	82
13	Sacramento Kings	28	54	.341	34.0	82
14	Los Angeles Lakers	27	55	.329	35.0	82
15	Utah Jazz	25	57	.305	37.0	82

=== Division ===
Northwest Division	W	L	PCT	GB	Home	Road	Div	GP
y-Oklahoma City Thunder	59	23	.720	–	34‍–‍7	25‍–‍16	11–5	82
x-Portland Trail Blazers	54	28	.659	5.0	31‍–‍10	23‍–‍18	13–3	82
Minnesota Timberwolves	40	42	.488	19.0	24‍–‍17	16‍–‍25	7–9	82
Denver Nuggets	36	46	.439	23.0	22‍–‍19	14‍–‍27	5–11	82
Utah Jazz	25	57	.305	34.0	16‍–‍25	9‍–‍32	4–12	82

== Game log ==
=== Preseason ===
2013 pre-season game log
Total: 4–3 (home: 2–2; road: 2–1)
Pre-season: 4–3 (home: 2–2; road: 2–1)

Game	Date	Team	Score	High points	High rebounds	High assists	Location Attendance	Record
1	October 5	@ Fenerbahçe Ülker	W 95–82	Kevin Durant (24)	Kevin Durant (8)	Reggie Jackson (5)	Ulker Sports Arena; 12,191	1–0
2	October 8	@ Philadelphia	W 103–99	Reggie Jackson (29)	Serge Ibaka (11)	Kevin Durant (12)	Phones 4u Arena; 13,472	2–0
3	October 15	Denver	W 109–81	Kevin Durant (36)	Ibaka & Roberson (9)	Serge Ibaka (5)	Chesapeake Energy Arena; 18,203	3–0
4	October 17	New Orleans	L 102–105	Kevin Durant (25)	Steven Adams (15)	Reggie Jackson (9)	BOK Center; 17,778	3–1
5	October 20	Utah	W 88–82	Reggie Jackson (18)	Steven Adams (10)	Reggie Jackson (6)	Chesapeake Energy Arena; 18,203	4–1
6	October 22	@ Phoenix	L 76–88	Reggie Jackson (18)	Jeremy Lamb (9)	Reggie Jackson (4)	US Airways Center; 11,526	4–2
7	October 23	Chicago	L 95–104	Durant & Lamb (22)	Steven Adams (7)	Reggie Jackson (6)	INTRUST Bank Arena; 15,004	4–3

2013–14 season schedule

=== Regular season ===
2013–14 game log
Total: 59–23 (home: 34–7; road: 25–16)
October: 1–0 (home: 0–0; road: 1–0)

Game	Date	Team	Score	High points	High rebounds	High assists	Location Attendance	Record
1	October 30	@ Utah	W 101–98	Kevin Durant (42)	Serge Ibaka (10)	Reggie Jackson (3)	EnergySolutions Arena; 19,911	1–0

November : 10–3 (home: 8–0; road: 2–3)

Game	Date	Team	Score	High points	High rebounds	High assists	Location Attendance	Record
2	November 1	@ Minnesota	L 81–100	Jeremy Lamb (16)	Serge Ibaka (9)	Jackson & Fisher (4)	Target Center; 17,433	1–1
3	November 3	Phoenix	W 103–96	Kevin Durant (33)	Durant & Ibaka (10)	Russell Westbrook (7)	Chesapeake Energy Arena; 18,203	2–1
4	November 6	Dallas	W 107–93	Kevin Durant (23)	Serge Ibaka (13)	Kevin Durant (10)	Chesapeake Energy Arena; 18,203	3–1
5	November 8	@ Detroit	W 119–110	Kevin Durant (37)	Steven Adams (10)	Kevin Durant (7)	Palace of Auburn Hills; 15,624	4–1
6	November 10	Washington	W 106–105 (OT)	Kevin Durant (33)	Kevin Durant (13)	Kevin Durant (6)	Chesapeake Energy Arena; 18,203	5–1
7	November 13	@ L.A. Clippers	L 103–111	Kevin Durant (33)	Kevin Durant (6)	Durant & Westbrook (10)	Staples Center; 19,273	5–2
8	November 14	@ Golden State	L 115–116	Russell Westbrook (31)	Serge Ibaka (13)	Kevin Durant (8)	Oracle Arena; 19,596	5–3
9	November 16	@ Milwaukee	W 92–79	Russell Westbrook (26)	Serge Ibaka (20)	Russell Westbrook (4)	BMO Harris Bradley Center; 15,984	6–3
10	November 18	Denver	W 115–113	Kevin Durant (38)	Russell Westbrook (12)	Russell Westbrook (7)	Chesapeake Energy Arena; 18,203	7–3
11	November 21	L.A. Clippers	W 105–91	Kevin Durant (28)	Steven Adams (7)	Kevin Durant (8)	Chesapeake Energy Arena; 18,203	8–3
12	November 24	Utah	W 95–73	Kevin Durant (19)	Serge Ibaka (11)	Reggie Jackson (7)	Chesapeake Energy Arena; 18,203	9–3
13	November 27	San Antonio	W 94–88	Kevin Durant (24)	Kevin Durant (13)	Russell Westbrook (8)	Chesapeake Energy Arena; 18,203	10–3
14	November 29	Golden State	W 113–112 (OT)	Russell Westbrook (34)	Durant & Ibaka (13)	Russell Westbrook (7)	Chesapeake Energy Arena; 18,203	11–3

December : 14–3 (home: 6–2; road: 8–1)

Game	Date	Team	Score	High points	High rebounds	High assists	Location Attendance	Record
15	December 1	Minnesota	W 113–103	Kevin Durant (32)	Kevin Durant (10)	Kevin Durant (12)	Chesapeake Energy Arena; 18,203	12–3
16	December 3	@ Sacramento	W 97–95	Kevin Durant (27)	Kevin Durant (11)	Russell Westbrook (7)	Sleep Train Arena; 15,089	13–3
17	December 4	@ Portland	L 104–111	Kevin Durant (33)	Serge Ibaka (10)	Russell Westbrook (5)	Moda Center; 18,950	13–4
18	December 6	@ New Orleans	W 109–95	Kevin Durant (29)	Serge Ibaka (13)	Durant, Westbrook &Jackson(4)	New Orleans Arena; 17,694	14–4
19	December 8	Indiana	W 118–94	Kevin Durant (36)	Kevin Durant (10)	Russell Westbrook (13)	Chesapeake Energy Arena; 18,203	15–4
20	December 10	@ Atlanta	W 101–92	Kevin Durant (30)	Durant & Ibaka (10)	Russell Westbrook (11)	Philips Arena; 12,503	16–4
21	December 11	@ Memphis	W 116–100	Russell Westbrook (27)	Serge Ibaka (7)	Russell Westbrook (9)	FedExForum; 16,345	17–4
22	December 13	L.A. Lakers	W 122–97	Kevin Durant (31)	Serge Ibaka (10)	Russell Westbrook (12)	Chesapeake Energy Arena; 18,203	18–4
23	December 15	Orlando	W 101–98	Kevin Durant (28)	Russell Westbrook (12)	Russell Westbrook (6)	Chesapeake Energy Arena; 18,203	19–4
24	December 17	@ Denver	W 105–93	Kevin Durant (30)	Russell Westbrook (13)	Russell Westbrook (8)	Pepsi Center; 17,035	20–4
25	December 19	Chicago	W 107–95	Kevin Durant (32)	Kevin Durant (9)	Russell Westbrook (10)	Chesapeake Energy Arena; 18,203	21–4
26	December 21	@ San Antonio	W 113–100	Russell Westbrook (31)	Serge Ibaka (14)	Russell Westbrook (4)	AT&T Center; 18,581	22–4
27	December 22	Toronto	L 98–104	Russell Westbrook (27)	Russell Westbrook (9)	Westbrook &Jackson (5)	Chesapeake Energy Arena; 18,203	22–5
28	December 25	@ New York	W 123–94	Kevin Durant (29)	Russell Westbrook (13)	Russell Westbrook (10)	Madison Square Garden; 19,812	23–5
29	December 27	@ Charlotte	W 89–85	Kevin Durant (34)	Kevin Durant (12)	Kevin Durant (6)	Time Warner Cable Arena; 18,129	24–5
30	December 29	Houston	W 117–86	Kevin Durant (33)	Kevin Durant (13)	Reggie Jackson (8)	Chesapeake Energy Arena; 18,203	25–5
31	December 31	Portland	L 94–98	Kevin Durant (37)	Kevin Durant (14)	Reggie Jackson (6)	Chesapeake Energy Arena; 18,203	25–6

January : 13–4 (home: 6–1; road: 7–3)

Game	Date	Team	Score	High points	High rebounds	High assists	Location Attendance	Record
32	January 2	Brooklyn	L 93–95	Kevin Durant (24)	Serge Ibaka (11)	Reggie Jackson (5)	Chesapeake Energy Arena; 18,203	25–7
33	January 4	@ Minnesota	W 115–111	Kevin Durant (48)	Steven Adams (9)	Kevin Durant (7)	Target Center; 18,065	26–7
34	January 5	Boston	W 119–96	Reggie Jackson (27)	Serge Ibaka (11)	Kevin Durant (8)	Chesapeake Energy Arena; 18,203	27–7
35	January 7	@ Utah	L 101–112	Kevin Durant (48)	Kevin Durant (7)	Reggie Jackson (6)	EnergySolutions Arena; 18,547	27–8
36	January 9	@ Denver	L 88–101	Kevin Durant (30)	Serge Ibaka (10)	Reggie Jackson (5)	Pepsi Center; 17,315	27−9
37	January 11	Milwaukee	W 101–85	Kevin Durant (33)	Serge Ibaka (17)	Kevin Durant (7)	Chesapeake Energy Arena; 18,203	28–9
38	January 14	@ Memphis	L 87–90	Kevin Durant (37)	Ibaka & Adams (9)	Kevin Durant (4)	FedExForum; 17,177	28–10
39	January 16	@ Houston	W 104–92	Kevin Durant (36)	Serge Ibaka (15)	Kevin Durant (7)	Toyota Center; 18,231	29–10
40	January 17	Golden State	W 127–121	Kevin Durant (54)	Kendrick Perkins (12)	Durant &Jackson (6)	Chesapeake Energy Arena; 18,203	30–10
41	January 19	Sacramento	W 108–93	Kevin Durant (30)	Adams & Collison (7)	Kevin Durant (9)	Chesapeake Energy Arena; 18,203	31–10
42	January 21	Portland	W 105–97	Kevin Durant (46)	Kendrick Perkins (8)	Reggie Jackson (5)	Chesapeake Energy Arena; 18,203	32–10
43	January 22	@ San Antonio	W 111–105	Kevin Durant (36)	Serge Ibaka (9)	Reggie Jackson (8)	AT&T Center; 18,581	33–10
44	January 24	@ Boston	W 101–83	Serge Ibaka (21)	Kendrick Perkins (9)	Reggie Jackson (8)	TD Garden; 18,624	34–10
45	January 25	@ Philadelphia	W 103–91	Kevin Durant (32)	Kevin Durant (14)	Kevin Durant (10)	Wells Fargo Center; 19,217	35–10
46	January 27	Atlanta	W 111–109	Kevin Durant (41)	Kendrick Perkins (7)	Durant, Jackson & Collison (5)	Chesapeake Energy Arena; 18,203	36–10
47	January 29	@ Miami	W 112–95	Kevin Durant (33)	Serge Ibaka (8)	Kevin Durant (5)	American Airlines Arena; 19,673	37–10
48	January 31	@ Brooklyn	W 120–95	Kevin Durant (26)	Serge Ibaka (9)	Durant & Jackson (7)	Barclays Center; 17,732	38–10

February : 6–5 (home: 4–3; road: 2–2)

Game	Date	Team	Score	High points	High rebounds	High assists	Location Attendance	Record
49	February 1	@ Washington	L 81–96	Kevin Durant (26)	Ibaka & Jackson (8)	Kevin Durant (7)	Verizon Center; 20,356	38–11
50	February 3	Memphis	W 86–77	Kevin Durant (31)	Serge Ibaka (12)	Kevin Durant (8)	Chesapeake Energy Arena; 18,203	39–11
51	February 5	Minnesota	W 106–97	Kevin Durant (26)	Kendrick Perkins (12)	Reggie Jackson (9)	Chesapeake Energy Arena; 18,203	40–11
52	February 7	@ Orlando	L 102–103	Kevin Durant (29)	Serge Ibaka (6)	Kevin Durant (12)	Amway Center; 15,599	40–12
53	February 9	New York	W 112–100	Kevin Durant (41)	Kendrick Perkins (11)	Kevin Durant (9)	Chesapeake Energy Arena; 18,203	41–12
54	February 11	@ Portland	W 98–95	Kevin Durant (36)	Serge Ibaka (11)	Reggie Jackson (5)	Moda Center; 20,018	42–12
55	February 13	@ L.A. Lakers	W 107–103	Kevin Durant (43)	Kevin Durant (12)	Kevin Durant (7)	Staples Center; 18,997	43–12
All-Star Break
56	February 20	Miami	L 81–103	Kevin Durant (28)	Durant & Ibaka (8)	Reggie Jackson (5)	Chesapeake Energy Arena; 18,203	43–13
57	February 23	L.A. Clippers	L 117–125	Kevin Durant (42)	Ibaka, Collison & Adams (6)	Kevin Durant (6)	Chesapeake Energy Arena; 18,203	43–14
58	February 26	Cleveland	L 104–114	Kevin Durant (28)	Serge Ibaka (13)	Durant & Westbrook (9)	Chesapeake Energy Arena; 18,203	43–15
59	February 28	Memphis	W 113–107	Kevin Durant (37)	Serge Ibaka (9)	Russell Westbrook (6)	Chesapeake Energy Arena; 18,203	44–15

March : 10–4 (home: 7–1; road: 3–3)

Game	Date	Team	Score	High points	High rebounds	High assists	Location Attendance	Record
60	March 2	Charlotte	W 116–98	Kevin Durant (28)	Serge Ibaka (10)	Durant & Westbrook (5)	Chesapeake Energy Arena; 18,203	45–15
61	March 4	Philadelphia	W 125–92	Kevin Durant (42)	Russell Westbrook (10)	Russell Westbrook (14)	Chesapeake Energy Arena; 18,203	46–15
62	March 6	@ Phoenix	L 122–128	Russell Westbrook (36)	Russell Westbrook (9)	Russell Westbrook (9)	US Airways Center; 17,816	46–16
63	March 9	@ L.A. Lakers	L 110–114	Kevin Durant (27)	Serge Ibaka (15)	Kevin Durant (12)	Staples Center; 18,997	46–17
64	March 11	Houston	W 106–98	Kevin Durant (40)	Serge Ibaka (16)	Russell Westbrook (7)	Chesapeake Energy Arena; 18,203	47–17
65	March 13	L.A. Lakers	W 131–102	Durant & Westbrook (29)	Serge Ibaka (13)	Russell Westbrook (9)	Chesapeake Energy Arena; 18,203	48–17
66	March 16	Dallas	L 86–109	Kevin Durant (30)	Nick Collison (7)	Kevin Durant (4)	Chesapeake Energy Arena; 18,203	48–18
67	March 17	@ Chicago	W 97–85	Kevin Durant (35)	Kevin Durant (12)	Russell Westbrook (9)	United Center; 22,261	49–18
68	March 20	@ Cleveland	W 102–95	Kevin Durant (35)	Durant & Ibaka (11)	Durant & Jackson (6)	Quicken Loans Arena; 18,246	50–18
69	March 21	@ Toronto	W 119–118 (2OT)	Kevin Durant (51)	Durant & Jackson (12)	Kevin Durant (7)	Air Canada Centre; 19,800	51–18
70	March 24	Denver	W 117–96	Kevin Durant (27)	Serge Ibaka (7)	Reggie Jackson (11)	Chesapeake Energy Arena; 18,203	52–18
71	March 25	@ Dallas	L 119–128 (OT)	Kevin Durant (43)	Westbrook & Collison (7)	Westbrook & Jackson (8)	American Airlines Center; 19,607	52–19
72	March 28	Sacramento	W 94–81	Kevin Durant (29)	Serge Ibaka (8)	Durant &Westbrook (6)	Chesapeake Energy Arena; 18,203	53–19
73	March 30	Utah	W 116–96	Kevin Durant (31)	Steven Adams (8)	Kevin Durant (9)	Chesapeake Energy Arena; 18,203	54–19

April : 5–4 (home: 3–0; road: 2–4)

Game	Date	Team	Score	High points	High rebounds	High assists	Location Attendance	Record
74	April 3	San Antonio	W 106–94	Kevin Durant (28)	Serge Ibaka (12)	Russell Westbrook (6)	Chesapeake Energy Arena; 18,203	55–19
75	April 4	@ Houston	L 107–111	Kevin Durant (28)	Kevin Durant (12)	Reggie Jackson (7)	Toyota Center; 18,407	55–20
76	April 6	@ Phoenix	L 115–122	Kevin Durant (38)	Kevin Durant (11)	Russell Westbrook (8)	US Airways Center; 18,422	55–21
77	April 8	@ Sacramento	W 107–92	Durant & Butler (23)	Nick Collison (7)	Jackson & Fisher (5)	Sleep Train Arena; 16,696	56–21
78	April 9	@ L.A. Clippers	W 107–101	Russell Westbrook (30)	Russell Westbrook (11)	Russell Westbrook (6)	Staples Center; 19,459	57–21
79	April 11	New Orleans	W 116–94	Kevin Durant (27)	Serge Ibaka (10)	Westbrook & Jackson (7)	Chesapeake Energy Arena; 18,203	58–21
80	April 13	@ Indiana	L 97–102	Kevin Durant (38)	Russell Westbrook (9)	Russell Westbrook (7)	Bankers Life Fieldhouse; 18,165	58–22
81	April 14	@ New Orleans	L 89–101	Kevin Durant (25)	Serge Ibaka (16)	Kevin Durant (6)	Smoothie King Center; 17,024	58–23
82	April 16	Detroit	W 112–111	Kevin Durant (42)	Serge Ibaka (15)	Russell Westbrook (8)	Chesapeake Energy Arena; 18,203	59–23

2013–14 season schedule

=== Playoffs ===
2014 playoff game log
Total: 10–9 (home: 6–4; road: 4–5)
First Round: 4–3 (home: 2–2; road: 2–1)

Game	Date	Team	Score	High points	High rebounds	High assists	Location Attendance	Series
1	April 19	Memphis	W 100–86	Kevin Durant (33)	Russell Westbrook (10)	Kevin Durant (7)	Chesapeake Energy Arena; 18,203	1–0
2	April 21	Memphis	L 105–111 (OT)	Kevin Durant (36)	Durant & Ibaka (11)	Russell Westbrook (8)	Chesapeake Energy Arena; 18,203	1–1
3	April 24	@ Memphis	L 95–98 (OT)	Durant & Westbrook (30)	Russell Westbrook (13)	Durant & Jackson (3)	FedExForum; 18,119	1–2
4	April 26	@ Memphis	W 92–89 (OT)	Reggie Jackson (32)	Serge Ibaka (14)	Russell Westbrook (7)	FedExForum; 18,119	2–2
5	April 29	Memphis	L 99–100 (OT)	Russell Westbrook (30)	Serge Ibaka (12)	Russell Westbrook (13)	Chesapeake Energy Arena; 18,203	2–3
6	May 1	@ Memphis	W 104–84	Kevin Durant (36)	Kevin Durant (10)	Russell Westbrook (5)	FedExForum; 18,119	3–3
7	May 3	Memphis	W 120–109	Kevin Durant (33)	Russell Westbrook (10)	Russell Westbrook (16)	Chesapeake Energy Arena; 18,203	4–3

Conference Semifinals: 4–2 (home: 2–1; road: 2–1)

Game	Date	Team	Score	High points	High rebounds	High assists	Location Attendance	Series
1	May 5	L.A. Clippers	L 105–122	Russell Westbrook (29)	Ibaka, Butler & Lamb (6)	Reggie Jackson (5)	Chesapeake Energy Arena; 18,203	0–1
2	May 7	L.A. Clippers	W 112–101	Kevin Durant (32)	Kevin Durant (12)	Russell Westbrook (10)	Chesapeake Energy Arena; 18,203	1–1
3	May 9	@ L.A. Clippers	W 118–112	Kevin Durant (36)	Steven Adams (9)	Russell Westbrook (13)	Staples Center; 19,530	2–1
4	May 11	@ L.A. Clippers	L 99–101	Kevin Durant (40)	Kevin Durant (7)	Russell Westbrook (8)	Staples Center; 19,365	2–2
5	May 13	L.A. Clippers	W 105–104	Russell Westbrook (38)	Kevin Durant (10)	Russell Westbrook (6)	Chesapeake Energy Arena; 18,203	3–2
6	May 15	@ L.A. Clippers	W 104–98	Kevin Durant (39)	Kevin Durant (16)	Russell Westbrook (12)	Staples Center; 19,565	4–2

Conference Finals: 2–4 (home: 2–1; road: 0–3)

Game	Date	Team	Score	High points	High rebounds	High assists	Location Attendance	Series
1	May 19	@ San Antonio	L 105–122	Kevin Durant (28)	Durant & Perkins (9)	Russell Westbrook (7)	AT&T Center; 18,581	0–1
2	May 21	@ San Antonio	L 77–112	Durant & Westbrook (15)	Steven Adams (8)	Russell Westbrook (5)	AT&T Center; 18,581	0–2
3	May 25	San Antonio	W 106–97	Russell Westbrook (26)	Kevin Durant (10)	Russell Westbrook (7)	Chesapeake Energy Arena; 18,203	1–2
4	May 27	San Antonio	W 105–92	Russell Westbrook (40)	Kendrick Perkins (10)	Russell Westbrook (10)	Chesapeake Energy Arena; 18,203	2–2
5	May 29	@ San Antonio	L 89–117	Kevin Durant (25)	Kendrick Perkins (6)	Russell Westbrook (7)	AT&T Center; 18,581	2–3
6	May 31	San Antonio	L 107–112 (OT)	Russell Westbrook (34)	Kevin Durant (14)	Russell Westbrook (8)	Chesapeake Energy Arena; 18,203	2–4

2014 playoff schedule

== Player statistics ==
Legend
GP	Games played	GS	Games started	MPG	Minutes per game
FG%	Field goal percentage	3P%	3-point field goal percentage	FT%	Free throw percentage
RPG	Rebounds per game	APG	Assists per game	SPG	Steals per game
BPG	Blocks per game	PPG	Points per game	**Bold**	Career high

=== Regular season ===
Oklahoma City Thunder statistics
Player	GP	GS	MPG	FG%	3P%	FT%	RPG	APG	SPG	BPG	PPG
Steven Adams	81	20	14.8	50.3%	-	58.1%	4.1	0.5	0.5	0.7	3.3
Caron Butler ^{≠}	22	0	27.2	40.9%	44.1%	84.2%	3.2	1.2	1.1	0.3	9.7
Nick Collison	81	0	16.7	55.6%	23.5%	71.0%	3.6	1.3	0.4	0.3	4.2
Kevin Durant	81	81	38.5	50.3%	39.1%	87.3%	7.4	5.5	1.3	0.7	32.0
Derek Fisher	81	0	17.6	39.1%	38.4%	77.5%	1.5	1.4	0.9	0.0	5.2
Ryan Gomes ^{†}	5	0	6.8	37.5%	0.0%	-	0.8	0.2	0.0	0.0	1.2
Serge Ibaka	81	81	32.9	53.6%	38.3%	78.4%	8.8	1.0	0.5	2.7	15.1
Royal Ivey ^{≠}	2	0	2.5	0.0%	0.0%	-	0.5	0.0	0.0	0.0	0.0
Reggie Jackson	80	36	28.5	44.0%	33.9%	89.3%	3.9	4.1	1.1	0.1	13.1
Perry Jones	62	7	12.3	45.9%	36.1%	66.7%	1.8	0.4	0.2	0.3	3.5
Jeremy Lamb	78	0	19.7	43.2%	35.6%	79.7%	2.4	1.5	0.7	0.3	8.5
Kendrick Perkins	62	62	19.5	45.1%	0.0%	55.2%	4.9	1.1	0.4	0.5	3.4
Andre Roberson	40	16	10.0	48.5%	15.4%	70.0%	2.4	0.4	0.5	0.3	1.9
Thabo Sefolosha	61	61	26.0	41.5%	31.6%	76.8%	3.6	1.5	1.3	0.3	6.3
Mustafa Shakur ^{≠}	3	0	3.7	0.0%	0.0%	50.0%	0.0	1.3	0.0	0.0	0.3
Hasheem Thabeet	23	0	8.3	56.5%	-	20.0%	1.7	0.0	0.2	0.4	1.2
Russell Westbrook	46	46	30.7	43.7%	31.8%	82.6%	5.7	6.9	1.9	0.2	21.8
Reggie Williams ^{≠}	3	0	5.7	55.6%	33.3%	-	0.0	0.3	0.3	0.0	3.7

Led team in statistic

After all games.
^{‡} Waived during the season
^{†} Traded during the season
^{≠} Acquired during the season

=== Playoffs ===
Oklahoma City Thunder statistics
Player	GP	GS	MPG	FG%	3P%	FT%	RPG	APG	SPG	BPG	PPG
Steven Adams	18	0	18.4	68.9%	-	34.8%	4.1	0.2	0.1	1.3	3.9
Caron Butler	18	2	23.3	32.4%	35.6%	78.6%	3.2	0.8	0.3	0.1	6.9
Nick Collison	17	2	10.8	41.4%	40.0%	70.0%	2.2	0.8	0.2	0.4	1.9
Kevin Durant	19	19	42.9	46.0%	34.4%	81.0%	8.9	3.9	1.0	1.3	29.6
Derek Fisher	19	0	15.7	31.5%	29.3%	100%	1.7	0.8	0.7	0.0	3.8
Serge Ibaka	17	17	34.2	59.2%	38.5%	76.5%	6.8	0.7	0.6	2.5	12.1
Reggie Jackson	19	4	27.9	46.6%	39.6%	88.6%	3.8	2.4	0.3	0.2	11.1
Perry Jones	11	0	5.0	38.9%	30.0%	-	0.8	0.1	0.0	0.1	1.5
Jeremy Lamb	11	0	9.1	40.5%	14.3%	100%	1.5	0.6	0.6	0.1	3.6
Kendrick Perkins	19	19	20.2	53.3%	-	80.0%	5.4	0.7	0.2	0.3	3.2
Andre Roberson	2	0	4.5	0.0%	-	-	1.0	0.0	0.0	0.0	0.0
Thabo Sefolosha	15	13	15.7	41.8%	26.1%	80.0%	2.1	0.7	0.7	0.0	3.7
Hasheem Thabeet	2	0	3.5	-	-	-	0.0	0.0	0.0	0.0	0.0
Russell Westbrook	19	19	38.7	42.0%	28.0%	88.4%	7.3	8.1	2.2	0.3	26.7

Led team in statistic

After all games.

=== Individual game highs ===
Category	Player	Statistic
Points	Kevin Durant	54 vs Warriors on January 17, 2014
Rebounds	Serge Ibaka	20 vs Bucks on November 16, 2013
Assists	Russell Westbrook	14 vs 76ers on March 4, 2014
Steals	Thabo Sefolosha; Reggie Jackson; Thabo Sefolosha; Steven Adams; Russell Westbrook	6 vs Clippers on November 13, 2013; 6 vs Rockets on January 16, 2014; 6 vs Heat on January 29, 2014; 6 vs Nuggets on March 24, 2014; 6 vs Pistons on April 16, 2014
Blocks	Serge Ibaka	8 vs Pelicans on April 11, 2014
Minutes	Kevin Durant	52:29 vs Raptors on March 21, 2014

Category	Player	Statistic
Field goals made	Kevin Durant	19 vs Warriors on January 17, 2014
Threes made	Kevin Durant	7 vs Raptors on March 21, 2014
Free throws made	Kevin Durant	22 vs Jazz on October 30, 2013
Double-doubles	Serge Ibaka	29
Triple-doubles	Kevin Durant	3

== Awards and records ==
=== Awards ===
Date	Player	Award
December 2, 2013	Kevin Durant (1/6)	November 25–December 1 Player of the Week (Note: Durant guided the Thunder to three victories in as many games. He ranked second in the conference in scoring (27.0 ppg), fifth in rebounding (12.0 rpg) and 11th in assists (7.0 apg).)
December 3, 2013	Kevin Durant (1/4)	October/November Player of the Month (Note: Durant guided the Thunder to an 11-3 record to start the season, including an 8-0 mark at Chesapeake Energy Arena, the best home start in the team’s Oklahoma City era. Durant paced the NBA in scoring (28.3 ppg) on the back of six 30-plus-point performances, including a season-high 42 points in a 101-98 win over the Utah Jazz on Oct. 30. Additionally, he recorded six double-doubles during October and November.)
December 30, 2013	Kevin Durant (2/6)	December 23–29 Player of the Week (Note: Durant led the Thunder to a 3-0 week behind a league-best 32.0 points on .574 shooting from the field, 10.7 rebounds (10th in the conference) and 5.7 assists.)
January 3, 2014	Kevin Durant (2/4)	December Player of the Month (Note: Durant guided the Thunder to a 14-3 (.824) record including an 8-1 road mark, both NBA bests. Durant ranked second in the league in scoring at 29.4 ppg to go along with 9.0 rpg and 4.5 apg. He shot .535 from the field including .481 from beyond the arc, and .880 from the free throw line. Durant netted 20-plus points 15 times, including 10 games with at least 30 points. Durant began the month with a triple-double, recording 32 points, a career-high 12 assists and 10 rebounds in a 113-103 win over Minnesota Dec. 1.)
January 20, 2014	Kevin Durant (3/6)	January 13–19 Player of the Week (Note: Durant led the Thunder to a 3-1 week, which included wins over Houston Rockets, Golden State Warriors and Sacramento Kings. He averaged a league-best 39.3 points, and added 6.5 assists and 4.8 rebounds. He tallied a career-high 54 points on 19-of-28 shooting from the field on Jan. 17, during the Thunder’s 127-121 win over the Warriors. Durant, who leads the NBA in scoring at 30.6 ppg, has tallied 30-plus points in seven consecutive contests.)
January 23, 2014	Kevin Durant	All-Star (Note: Durant has helped guide the Thunder to a Western Conference leading 33-10 record this season while averaging a career-best 31.0 points (1st in the NBA) to go along with 7.7 rebounds, 5.1 assists and 1.51 steals in 37.8 minutes per game. In the last 11 games, Durant is averaging 38.1 points per game while shooting 52.0% from the field.)
January 27, 2014	Kevin Durant (4/6)	January 20–26 Player of the Week (Note: Durant led Oklahoma City to three wins during a 4-0 week, having missed the 101-83 win over the Celtics on Jan. 24 (shoulder). He averaged a league-leading 38.0 ppg and added 8.7 rebounds and 6.3 assists. Durant collected a triple-double with 32 points, 14 rebounds and 10 assists during a 103-91 win over the Philadelphia 76ers on Jan. 25.)
February 5, 2014	Kevin Durant (3/4)	January Player of the Month (Note: Durant, who captured his third consecutive Kia NBA Western Conference Player of the Month award, led the NBA in scoring (35.9 ppg), ranked fifth in the conference in minutes (38.3 mpg), tied for eighth in the conference in steals (1.63 spg) and 10th in the conference in field goal percentage (.549) as he helped the Thunder to a 13-4 (.765) record in January. Durant appeared in 16 of Oklahoma City’s 17 games, and scored 20 or more points each time, 30 or more points 13 times, 40 or more points five times, and 50-plus one time – on Jan. 17, when he set a career high with 54 during a 127-121 win over the Golden State Warriors.)
February 10, 2014	Kevin Durant (5/6)	February 3–9 Player of the Week (Note: Durant led the Thunder to a 3-1 week, which included wins over Memphis Grizzlies, Minnesota Timberwolves and New York Knicks. He averaged 31.8 points (second in the conference), 9.0 assists (second in the conference) and 8.0 rebounds. Durant posted two-double-doubles, including a 41-point, 10-rebound effort in which he added nine assists on Feb. 9, as the Thunder beat the Knicks 112-100, at Chesapeake Energy Arena.)
March 24, 2014	Kevin Durant (6/6)	March 17–23 Player of the Week (Note: Durant led the Thunder to a 3-0 week, tallying 35 points or more in all three contests. He averaged a league-best 40.3 ppg and added 11.7 rebounds (fourth in the conference) and 6.0 assists (tied-10th in the conference). Durant closed the week with a 51-point, 12-rebound, seven-assist effort on March 21, as the Thunder topped the Toronto Raptors 119-118 in double overtime.)
April 1, 2014	Kevin Durant (4/4)	March Player of the Month (Note: Durant led the NBA in scoring (34.5 ppg) and added 6.7 rebounds and 5.9 assists as the Thunder went 10-4. He became the first player to average at least 33.0 points in three consecutive months since Michael Jordan during the 1989-90 season. Durant has scored at least 25 points in 38 straight games, two shy of the modern record 40 set by Jordan in 1989-90. He scored 30 or more points nine times in March, topped the 40-point mark on four occasions and hit for 51 points to go with 12 rebounds and seven assists in a 119-118 double overtime win over the Toronto Raptors on March 21. Durant has earned Player of the Month honors four times in five months this season.)
May 6, 2014	Kevin Durant	NBA Most Valuable Player (Note: Durant earned the honor after leading the Thunder to a fourth consecutive Northwest Division title and the second best record in the NBA (59-23). Durant totaled 1,232 points, including 119 first-place votes, from a panel of 124 voters.)
May 22, 2014	Steven Adams	NBA All-Rookie Second Team (Note: Adams appeared in 81 games (20 starts) for Oklahoma City and averaged 3.3 points, 4.1 rebounds and .70 blocks in 14.8 minutes.)
June 2, 2014	Serge Ibaka	NBA All-Defensive First Team (Note: Ibaka appeared in 81 games for Oklahoma City this past season as the Thunder held the opposition to the third lowest field goal percentage in the NBA (.436).)
June 4, 2014	Kevin Durant	All-NBA First Team (Note: Durant, who earlier this year was named the 2013-14 Kia NBA Most Valuable Player, was named to the All-NBA First Team for a fifth consecutive season. The seventh-year forward was the lone unanimous selection, garnering all 125 First Team votes.)

== Transactions ==
=== Overview ===
Players Added

Via draft

- Steven Adams

Via trade

- André Roberson
  (Draft rights)

Via free agency

- Ryan Gomes
Players Lost

Via free agency

- Ronnie Brewer
- Kevin Martin

Waived

- DeAndre Liggins
- Daniel Orton

=== Trades ===
June 28, 2013	To Oklahoma City Thunder Draft rights to Andre Roberson	To Golden State Warriors Draft rights to Archie Goodwin; Cash considerations
June 28, 2013	To Oklahoma City Thunder Draft rights to Grant Jerrett	To Portland Trail Blazers Cash considerations
July 11, 2013	To Oklahoma City Thunder Draft rights to Szymon Szewczyk via MIL	To Minnesota Timberwolves Kevin Martin via OKC; Cash considerations via OKC
July 11, 2013	To Milwaukee Bucks Luke Ridnour via MIN; 2014 second-round pick via MIN; Cash considerations via OKC
January 7, 2014	To Oklahoma City Thunder 2014 second-round pick via MEM; 2017 second-round pick via MEM	To Boston Celtics Jerryd Bayless via MEM; Ryan Gomes via OKC
January 7, 2014	To Memphis Grizzlies Courtney Lee via BOS; 2016 second-round pick via BOS; Cash considerations via OKC

=== Free agency ===
==== Re-signed ====
Date	Player	Contract
July 24, 2013	Derek Fisher	Standard

==== Additions ====
Date	Player	Contract	Former team
August 7, 2013	Ryan Gomes	Standard	(Germany) Artland Dragons
In-Season Additions
January 16, 2014	Royal Ivey	10-Day	Philadelphia 76ers
March 1, 2014	Caron Butler	Standard	Milwaukee Bucks
March 6, 2014	Reggie Williams	10-Day	Tulsa 66ers (D-League)
March 16, 2014	Mustafa Shakur	10-Day	Tulsa 66ers (D-League)
March 28, 2014	Reggie Williams	Second 10-Day	Oklahoma City Thunder
April 7, 2014	Grant Jerrett	Standard	Tulsa 66ers (D-League)

==== Subtractions ====
Date	Player	Reason left	New team
July 11, 2013	Kevin Martin	Free Agent	Minnesota Timberwolves
August 28, 2013	Ronnie Brewer	Free Agent	Houston Rockets
September 6, 2013	DeAndre Liggins	Waived	Sioux Falls Skyforce (D-League)
October 10, 2013	Daniel Orton	Waived	Philadelphia 76ers
