= 2013–14 Los Angeles Clippers season =

NBA professional basketball team season

- Division champions
- Head coach: Doc Rivers
- General manager: Doc Rivers
- Owner(s): Donald Sterling (until April 29, 2014); Andy Roeser (interim post April 29, 2014)
- Arena: Staples Center

Results
- Record: 57–25 (.695)
- Place: Division: 1st (Pacific); Conference: 3rd (Western)
- Playoff finish: Conference Semifinals (lost to Thunder 2–4)
- Stats at Basketball Reference

Local media
- Television: Fox Sports West and Prime Ticket
- Radio: KFWB

The 2013–14 Los Angeles Clippers season was the 44th season of the franchise in the National Basketball Association (NBA), their 36th season in Southern California, and their 30th season in Los Angeles. The team finished with a franchise record of 57–25, earning them the 3rd seed in the Western Conference. It was also the last season under Donald Sterling's ownership, as after the regular season ended and during their trip to the Playoffs, a leaked conversation with him that happened before the season began came to light involving controversial and racial remarks against black people, especially toward that of former Lakers player Magic Johnson.

In the playoffs, the Clippers defeated the Golden State Warriors in seven games in the First Round, but lost to the Oklahoma City Thunder in six games in the Semi-finals.

== Key dates ==
- June 27, 2013: The 2013 NBA draft took place at Barclays Center in Brooklyn, New York.
- April 2, 2014: The Clippers win their second Pacific Division championship, defeating the Suns in Phoenix, 112–108.
- April 29, 2014: After being exposed making controversial and racial remarks to a female friend via an audio recording, owner Donald Sterling is banned for life from the NBA by commissioner Adam Silver. Team president Andy Roeser would take over as the interim owner for the rest of the season following Sterling's ban. Sterling was also fined $2.5 million for his remarks, and he and his family subsequently sold the team to former Microsoft CEO Steve Ballmer in August 2014.

== Draft picks ==
Round	Pick	Player	Position	Nationality	College/Team
1	25	Reggie Bullock	G/F	United States	North Carolina

== Roster ==
2013–14 Los Angeles Clippers roster
Players

Pos.	No.	Player	Height	Weight	DOB	From
F	22	Matt Barnes	6 ft 7 in (2.01 m)	226 lb (103 kg)	1980–03–09	UCLA
G/F	25	Reggie Bullock	6 ft 7 in (2.01 m)	205 lb (93 kg)	1991–03–16	North Carolina
G	2	Darren Collison	6 ft 0 in (1.83 m)	175 lb (79 kg)	1987–08–23	UCLA
G	11	Jamal Crawford	6 ft 5 in (1.96 m)	200 lb (91 kg)	1980–03–20	Michigan
F	0	Glen Davis	6 ft 9 in (2.06 m)	289 lb (131 kg)	1986–01–01	LSU
G/F	9	Jared Dudley	6 ft 7 in (2.01 m)	225 lb (102 kg)	1985–07–10	Boston College
F	33	Danny Granger	6 ft 9 in (2.06 m)	228 lb (103 kg)	1983–04–20	New Mexico
G	34	Willie Green	6 ft 3 in (1.91 m)	201 lb (91 kg)	1981–07–28	Detroit Mercy
F	32	Blake Griffin	6 ft 10 in (2.08 m)	251 lb (114 kg)	1989–03–16	Oklahoma
C	15	Ryan Hollins	7 ft 0 in (2.13 m)	240 lb (109 kg)	1984–10–10	UCLA
C	6	DeAndre Jordan	6 ft 11 in (2.11 m)	265 lb (120 kg)	1988–07–21	Texas A&M
G	3	Chris Paul	6 ft 0 in (1.83 m)	175 lb (79 kg)	1985–05–06	Wake Forest
G	4	JJ Redick	6 ft 4 in (1.93 m)	190 lb (86 kg)	1984–06–24	Duke
F	8	Hedo Türkoğlu	6 ft 10 in (2.08 m)	220 lb (100 kg)	1979–03–19	Turkey

Coaches
Head coach
- Doc Rivers
Assistant(s)
- Alvin Gentry
- Kevin Eastman
- Armond Hill
- Tyronn Lue

Legend
- (DP) Unsigned draft pick
- (FA) Free agent
- (S) Suspended
- (DL) On assignment to D-League affiliate
- Injured

Roster
Updated: 2014–04–19

=== Roster notes ===
- Coach Glenn "Doc" Rivers played for the franchise as its starting point guard in the 1991–1992 NBA season.
- This will be Alvin Gentry's second stint as an assistant coach for the Clippers. He was also head coach of the team from 2000 to 2003.
- Assistant coach Armond Hill played for the franchise back in 1982 when they were still the San Diego Clippers.
- Assistant coach Tyronn Lue previously played for the crosstown rival Lakers from 1998 to 2001.
- Forward Antawn Jamison and guards Darius Morris & Sasha Vujacic become the 21st, 22nd and 23rd former Lakers to play for the Clippers. All three players failed to stay as Clippers for the whole season.

== Pre-season ==
2013 pre-season game log
Total: 5–3 (home: 2–2; road: 3–1)
Pre-season: 5–3 (home: 2–2; road: 3–1)

Game	Date	Team	Score	High points	High rebounds	High assists	Location Attendance	Record
1	October 7	@ Portland	W 89–81	DeAndre Jordan (16)	Jordan & Paul (8)	Chris Paul (5)	Moda Center; 12,849	1–0
2	October 12	@ Utah	W 106–74	Byron Mullens (15)	DeAndre Jordan (7)	Paul & Collison (10)	EnergySolutions Arena; 17,924	2–0
3	October 14	@ Sacramento	L 88–99	Jamal Crawford (25)	Byron Mullens (7)	Darren Collison (10)	Sleep Train Arena; 12,122	2–1
4	October 15	@ Phoenix	W 102–96	Chris Paul (24)	DeAndre Jordan (11)	Chris Paul (9)	US Airways Center; 11,516	3–1
5	October 18	Portland	L 84–94	Darren Collison (31)	Griffin, Jordan, & Jamison (6)	Darren Collison (6)	Staples Center; 14,849	3–2
6	October 19	Denver	W 118–111 (OT)	Chris Paul (40)	Blake Griffin (8)	Chris Paul (11)	Mandalay Bay Events Center; 9,535	4–2
7	October 23	Utah	W 103–99	Jamal Crawford (16)	DeAndre Jordan (7)	Chris Paul (10)	Staples Center; 13,611	5–2
8	October 25	Sacramento	L 100–110	Chris Paul (23)	DeAndre Jordan (9)	Jamal Crawford (6)	Staples Center; 15,082	5–3

2013–14 season schedule

== Regular season ==
=== Standings ===
Pacific Division	W	L	PCT	GB	Home	Road	Div	GP
y-Los Angeles Clippers	57	25	.695	–	34‍–‍7	23‍–‍18	12–4	82
x-Golden State Warriors	51	31	.622	6.0	27‍–‍14	24‍–‍17	11–5	82
Phoenix Suns	48	34	.585	9.0	26‍–‍15	22‍–‍19	8–8	82
Sacramento Kings	28	54	.341	29.0	17‍–‍24	11‍–‍30	3–13	82
Los Angeles Lakers	27	55	.329	30.0	14‍–‍27	13‍–‍28	6–10	82

Western Conference
#	Team	W	L	PCT	GB	GP
1	z-San Antonio Spurs *	62	20	.756	–	82
2	y-Oklahoma City Thunder *	59	23	.720	3.0	82
3	y-Los Angeles Clippers *	57	25	.695	5.0	82
4	x-Houston Rockets	54	28	.659	8.0	82
5	x-Portland Trail Blazers	54	28	.659	8.0	82
6	x-Golden State Warriors	51	31	.622	11.0	82
7	x-Memphis Grizzlies	50	32	.610	12.0	82
8	x-Dallas Mavericks	49	33	.598	13.0	82
9	Phoenix Suns	48	34	.585	14.0	82
10	Minnesota Timberwolves	40	42	.488	22.0	82
11	Denver Nuggets	36	46	.439	26.0	82
12	New Orleans Pelicans	34	48	.415	28.0	82
13	Sacramento Kings	28	54	.341	34.0	82
14	Los Angeles Lakers	27	55	.329	35.0	82
15	Utah Jazz	25	57	.305	37.0	82

=== Game log ===
2013–14 game log
Total: 57–25 (home: 34–7; road: 23–18)
October: 1–1 (home: 1–0; road: 0–1)

Game	Date	Team	Score	High points	High rebounds	High assists	Location Attendance	Record
1	October 29	@ L.A. Lakers	L 103–116	Blake Griffin (19)	DeAndre Jordan (11)	Chris Paul (11)	Staples Center; 18,997	0–1
2	October 31	Golden State	W 126–115	Chris Paul (42)	DeAndre Jordan (17)	Chris Paul (15)	Staples Center; 19,060	1–1

November : 11–4 (home: 7–1; road: 4–3)

Game	Date	Team	Score	High points	High rebounds	High assists	Location Attendance	Record
3	November 1	@ Sacramento	W 110–101	Chris Paul (26)	Blake Griffin (17)	Chris Paul (10)	Sleep Train Arena; 17,317	2–1
4	November 4	Houston	W 137–118	JJ Redick (26)	DeAndre Jordan (9)	Chris Paul (17)	Staples Center; 19,404	3–1
5	November 6	@ Orlando	L 90–98	Blake Griffin (23)	DeAndre Jordan (19)	Chris Paul (10)	Amway Center; 15,807	3–2
6	November 7	@ Miami	L 97–102	Blake Griffin (27)	Griffin & Jordan (14)	Chris Paul (12)	American Airlines Arena; 19,600	3–3
7	November 9	@ Houston	W 107–94	Griffin & Redick (22)	DeAndre Jordan (18)	Chris Paul (13)	Toyota Center; 18,108	4–3
8	November 11	Minnesota	W 109–107	Blake Griffin (25)	DeAndre Jordan (11)	Chris Paul (11)	Staples Center; 19,060	5–3
9	November 13	Oklahoma City	W 111–103	Blake Griffin (22)	Blake Griffin (12)	Chris Paul (16)	Staples Center; 19,273	6–3
10	November 16	Brooklyn	W 110–103	Blake Griffin (30)	DeAndre Jordan (16)	Chris Paul (13)	Staples Center; 19,349	7–3
11	November 18	Memphis	L 102–106	Blake Griffin (23)	DeAndre Jordan (16)	Chris Paul (11)	Staples Center; 19,060	7–4
12	November 20	@ Minnesota	W 102–98	Griffin & Paul (20)	DeAndre Jordan (12)	Chris Paul (11)	Target Center; 13,101	8–4
13	November 21	@ Oklahoma City	L 91–105	Blake Griffin (27)	DeAndre Jordan (12)	Chris Paul (12)	Chesapeake Energy Arena; 18,203	8–5
14	November 23	Sacramento	W 103–102	Chris Paul (22)	DeAndre Jordan (12)	Chris Paul (9)	Staples Center; 19,060	9–5
15	November 24	Chicago	W 121–82	Jared Dudley (21)	Blake Griffin (12)	Chris Paul (17)	Staples Center; 19,245	10–5
16	November 27	New York	W 93–80	Blake Griffin (15)	Blake Griffin (13)	Chris Paul (7)	Staples Center; 19,270	11–5
17	November 29	@ Sacramento	W 104–98 (OT)	Jamal Crawford (31)	DeAndre Jordan (15)	Jamal Crawford (11)	Sleep Train Arena; 17,317	12–5

December : 9–7 (home: 5–2; road: 4–5)

Game	Date	Team	Score	High points	High rebounds	High assists	Location Attendance	Record
18	December 1	Indiana	L 100–105	Jamal Crawford (20)	Blake Griffin (12)	Chris Paul (10)	Staples Center; 19,060	12–6
19	December 4	@ Atlanta	L 97–107	Blake Griffin (24)	DeAndre Jordan (13)	Chris Paul (11)	Philips Arena; 12,020	12–7
20	December 5	@ Memphis	W 101–81	Chris Paul (15)	DeAndre Jordan (14)	Chris Paul (8)	FedExForum; 15,112	13–7
21	December 7	@ Cleveland	L 82–88	Jamal Crawford (19)	DeAndre Jordan (13)	Chris Paul (15)	Quicken Loans Arena; 16,216	13–8
22	December 9	@ Philadelphia	W 94–83	Blake Griffin (26)	DeAndre Jordan (21)	Chris Paul (13)	Wells Fargo Center; 12,355	14–8
23	December 11	@ Boston	W 96–88	Chris Paul (22)	Blake Griffin (7)	Chris Paul (9)	TD Garden; 17,587	15–8
24	December 12	@ Brooklyn	L 93–102	Chris Paul (20)	DeAndre Jordan (12)	Blake Griffin (3)	Barclays Center; 15,563	15–9
25	December 14	@ Washington	W 113–97	Chris Paul (38)	DeAndre Jordan (10)	Chris Paul (12)	Verizon Center; 16,509	16–9
26	December 16	San Antonio	W 115–92	Blake Griffin (27)	DeAndre Jordan (11)	Chris Paul (7)	Staples Center; 19,253	17–9
27	December 18	New Orleans	W 108–95	Blake Griffin (21)	DeAndre Jordan (20)	Chris Paul (11)	Staples Center; 19,060	18–9
28	December 21	Denver	W 112–91	Jamal Crawford (27)	Blake Griffin (16)	Chris Paul (11)	Staples Center; 19,129	19–9
29	December 22	Minnesota	W 120–116 (OT)	Blake Griffin (32)	DeAndre Jordan (17)	Chris Paul (13)	Staples Center; 19,304	20–9
30	December 25	@ Golden State	L 103–105	Chris Paul (26)	Blake Griffin (14)	Chris Paul (11)	Oracle Arena; 19,596	20–10
31	December 26	@ Portland	L 112–116 (OT)	Blake Griffin (35)	DeAndre Jordan (19)	Chris Paul (16)	Moda Center; 20,053	20–11
32	December 28	Utah	W 98–90	Blake Griffin (40)	DeAndre Jordan (12)	Chris Paul (9)	Staples Center; 19,278	21–11
33	December 30	Phoenix	L 88–107	Jamal Crawford & Blake Griffin (15)	DeAndre Jordan (19)	Chris Paul (7)	Staples Center; 19,278	21–12

January : 12–4 (home: 6–0; road: 6–4)

Game	Date	Team	Score	High points	High rebounds	High assists	Location Attendance	Record
34	January 1	Charlotte	W 112–85	Blake Griffin (31)	Blake Griffin & DeAndre Jordan (12)	Chris Paul (14)	Staples Center; 19,160	22–12
35	January 3	@ Dallas	W 119–112	DeAndre Jordan & Blake Griffin (25)	DeAndre Jordan (18)	Chris Paul (6)	American Airlines Center; 20,187	23–12
36	January 4	@ San Antonio	L 92–116	Jamal Crawford (24)	DeAndre Jordan (10)	Jamal Crawford (7)	AT&T Center; 18,581	23–13
37	January 6	Orlando	W 101–81	Darren Collison (21)	DeAndre Jordan (17)	Jamal Crawford (8)	Staples Center; 19,060	24–13
38	January 8	Boston	W 111–105	Blake Griffin (29)	DeAndre Jordan (13)	Blake Griffin (8)	Staples Center; 19,214	25–13
39	January 10	L.A. Lakers	W 123–87	Blake Griffin (33)	Blake Griffin (12)	Darren Collison (7)	Staples Center; 19,316	26–13
40	January 15	Dallas	W 129–127	JJ Redick (33)	DeAndre Jordan (13)	Darren Collison (10)	Staples Center; 19,208	27–13
41	January 17	@ New York	W 109–95	Blake Griffin (32)	DeAndre Jordan (16)	Darren Collison (7)	Madison Square Garden; 19,812	28–13
42	January 18	@ Indiana	L 92–106	Jamal Crawford (22)	DeAndre Jordan (17)	three players (4)	Bankers Life Fieldhouse; 18,165	28–14
43	January 20	@ Detroit	W 112–103	Jamal Crawford (26)	DeAndre Jordan (21)	Darren Collison & JJ Redick (6)	Palace of Auburn Hills; 17,417	29–14
44	January 22	@ Charlotte	L 91–95	Blake Griffin (27)	DeAndre Jordan (20)	Blake Griffin (6)	Time Warner Cable Arena; 14,760	29–15
45	January 24	@ Chicago	W 112–95	Blake Griffin (26)	Blake Griffin (13)	Blake Griffin (7)	United Center; 21,755	30–15
46	January 25	@ Toronto	W 126–118	Jamal Crawford (37)	DeAndre Jordan (11)	Jamal Crawford (11)	Air Canada Centre; 19,800	31–15
47	January 27	@ Milwaukee	W 114–86	Jamal Crawford (25)	DeAndre Jordan (18)	Darren Collison (7)	BMO Harris Bradley Center; 11,126	32–15
48	January 29	Washington	W 110–103	Blake Griffin (29)	Deandre Jordan (17)	Darren Collison (9)	Staples Center; 19,060	33–15
49	January 30	@ Golden State	L 92–111	Blake Griffin (27)	Deandre Jordan (20)	Darren Collison (5)	Oracle Arena; 19,596	33–16

February : 7–4 (home: 5–2; road: 2–2)

Game	Date	Team	Score	High points	High rebounds	High assists	Location Attendance	Record
50	February 1	Utah	W 102–87	Jamal Crawford (27)	Deandre Jordan (14)	Darren Collison (6)	Staples Center; 19,060	34–16
51	February 3	@ Denver	L 115–116	Blake Griffin (36)	Deandre Jordan (12)	Darren Collison (6)	Pepsi Center; 16,567	34–17
52	February 5	Miami	L 112–116	Blake Griffin (43)	Deandre Jordan (16)	Darren Collison (9)	Staples Center; 19,672	34–18
53	February 7	Toronto	W 118–105	Blake Griffin (36)	Deandre Jordan (13)	Darren Collison (7)	Staples Center; 19,060	35–18
54	February 9	Philadelphia	W 123–78	Blake Griffin (26)	Deandre Jordan (20)	Chris Paul (8)	Staples Center; 19,157	36–18
55	February 12	Portland	W 122–117	Blake Griffin (36)	Blake Griffin (10)	Chris Paul (12)	Staples Center; 19,175	37–18
All-Star Break
56	February 18	San Antonio	L 103–113	Blake Griffin (35)	Deandre Jordan (18)	Chris Paul (9)	Staples Center; 19,257	37–19
57	February 21	@ Memphis	L 96–102	Blake Griffin (28)	Blake Griffin (13)	Chris Paul (14)	FedExForum; 17,963	37–20
58	February 23	@ Oklahoma City	W 125–117	Jamal Crawford (36)	Deandre Jordan (12)	Chris Paul (12)	Chesapeake Energy Arena; 18,203	38–20
59	February 24	@ New Orleans	W 123–110	Jamal Crawford (24)	Deandre Jordan (16)	Chris Paul (13)	Smoothie King Center; 16,185	39–20
60	February 26	Houston	W 101–93	Blake Griffin (23)	Blake Griffin (16)	Chris Paul (9)	Staples Center; 19,258	40–20

March : 13–2 (home: 7–0; road: 6–2)

Game	Date	Team	Score	High points	High rebounds	High assists	Location Attendance	Record
61	March 1	New Orleans	W 108–76	Chris Paul (21)	DeAndre Jordan (12)	Chris Paul (8)	Staples Center; 19,060	41–20
62	March 4	@ Phoenix	W 104–96	Matt Barnes (28)	DeAndre Jordan (17)	Chris Paul (9)	US Airways Center; 15,068	42–20
63	March 6	@ L.A. Lakers	W 142–94	Darren Collison (24)	Jordan & Barnes (12)	Chris Paul (11)	Staples Center; 18,488	43–20
64	March 8	Atlanta	W 109–108	Blake Griffin (27)	DeAndre Jordan (12)	Chris Paul (10)	Staples Center; 19,178	44–20
65	March 10	Phoenix	W 112–105	Blake Griffin (37)	DeAndre Jordan (17)	Chris Paul (11)	Staples Center; 19,226	45–20
66	March 12	Golden State	W 111–98	Blake Griffin (30)	Blake Griffin (15)	Chris Paul (12)	Staples Center; 19,570	46–20
67	March 14	@ Utah	W 96–87	Blake Griffin (20)	DeAndre Jordan (10)	Chris Paul (7)	EnergySolutions Arena; 19,381	47–20
68	March 16	Cleveland	W 102–80	Blake Griffin (21)	Jordan & Griffin (11)	Chris Paul (15)	Staples Center; 19,274	48–20
69	March 17	@ Denver	L 100–110	Chris Paul (29)	Blake Griffin (12)	Chris Paul (7)	Pepsi Center; 16,553	48–21
70	March 22	Detroit	W 112–103	Chris Paul (28)	DeAndre Jordan (12)	Chris Paul (15)	Staples Center; 19,214	49–21
71	March 24	Milwaukee	W 106–98	Blake Griffin (27)	Blake Griffin (14)	Chris Paul (7)	Staples Center; 19,060	50–21
72	March 26	@ New Orleans	L 96–98	Jamal Crawford (31)	DeAndre Jordan (16)	Chris Paul (12)	Smoothie King Center; 16,363	50–22
73	March 27	@ Dallas	W 109–103	Chris Paul (31)	DeAndre Jordan (15)	Chris Paul (9)	American Airlines Center; 19,912	51–22
74	March 29	@ Houston	W 118–107	Chris Paul (30)	DeAndre Jordan (12)	Chris Paul (12)	Toyota Center; 18,337	52–22
75	March 31	@ Minnesota	W 114–94	Darren Collison (28)	DeAndre Jordan (24)	Chris Paul (9)	Target Center; 12,172	53–22

April : 4–3 (home: 3–2; road: 1–1)

Game	Date	Team	Score	High points	High rebounds	High assists	Location Attendance	Record
76	April 2	@ Phoenix	W 112–108	Griffin & Collison (23)	DeAndre Jordan (11)	Chris Paul (9)	US Airways Center; 16,091	54–22
77	April 3	Dallas	L 107–113	Blake Griffin (25)	DeAndre Jordan (15)	Blake Griffin (11)	Staples Center; 19,222	54–23
78	April 6	L.A. Lakers	W 120–97	Griffin & Paul (23)	DeAndre Jordan (12)	Paul & Collison (6)	Staples Center; 19,239	55–23
79	April 9	Oklahoma City	L 101–107	Blake Griffin (30)	Griffin & Jordan (12)	Paul & Redick (8)	Staples Center; 19,459	55–24
80	April 12	Sacramento	W 117–101	Blake Griffin (27)	DeAndre Jordan (9)	Chris Paul (10)	Staples Center; 19,060	56–24
81	April 15	Denver	W 117–105	Blake Griffin (24)	DeAndre Jordan (16)	Chris Paul (10)	Staples Center; 19,330	57–24
82	April 16	@ Portland	L 104–110	Jamal Crawford (34)	Matt Barnes (8)	Jamal Crawford (8)	Moda Center; 20,021	57–25

2013–14 season schedule

== Playoffs ==
=== Game log ===
2014 playoff game log
Total: 6–7 (home: 4–3; road: 2–4)
First Round: 4–3 (home: 3–1; road: 1–2)

Game	Date	Team	Score	High points	High rebounds	High assists	Location Attendance	Series
1	April 19	Golden State	L 105–109	Chris Paul (28)	DeAndre Jordan (14)	Chris Paul (8)	Staples Center; 19,339	0–1
2	April 21	Golden State	W 138–98	Blake Griffin (35)	DeAndre Jordan (9)	Paul, Collison (10)	Staples Center; 19,570	1–1
3	April 24	@ Golden State	W 98–96	Blake Griffin (32)	DeAndre Jordan (22)	Chris Paul (10)	Oracle Arena; 19,596	2–1
4	April 27	@ Golden State	L 97–118	Jamal Crawford (26)	Griffin, Jordan (6)	Chris Paul (6)	Oracle Arena; 19,596	2–2
5	April 29	Golden State	W 113–103	DeAndre Jordan (25)	DeAndre Jordan (18)	Chris Paul (7)	Staples Center; 19,657	3–2
6	May 1	@ Golden State	L 99–100	Jamal Crawford (19)	DeAndre Jordan (19)	Chris Paul (8)	Oracle Arena; 19,596	3–3
7	May 3	Golden State	W 126–121	Blake Griffin (24)	DeAndre Jordan (18)	Chris Paul (14)	Staples Center; 19,543	4–3

Conference Semifinals: 2–4 (home: 1–2; road: 1–2)

Game	Date	Team	Score	High points	High rebounds	High assists	Location Attendance	Series
1	May 5	@ Oklahoma City	W 122–105	Chris Paul (32)	Griffin, Jordan, Granger (24)	Chris Paul (10)	Chesapeake Energy Arena; 18,203	1–0
2	May 7	@ Oklahoma City	L 101–112	JJ Redick (18)	DeAndre Jordan (8)	Chris Paul (11)	Chesapeake Energy Arena; 18,203	1–1
3	May 9	Oklahoma City	L 112–118	Blake Griffin (34)	DeAndre Jordan (11)	Chris Paul (16)	Staples Center; 19,530	1–2
4	May 11	Oklahoma City	W 101–99	Blake Griffin (25)	DeAndre Jordan (14)	Chris Paul (10)	Staples Center; 19,365	2–2
5	May 13	@ Oklahoma City	L 104–105	Blake Griffin (24)	Blake Griffin (17)	Chris Paul (14)	Chesapeake Energy Arena; 18,203	2–3
6	May 15	Oklahoma City	L 98–104	Chris Paul (25)	DeAndre Jordan (15)	Chris Paul (11)	Staples Center; 19,565	2–4

2014 playoff schedule

== Injuries and surgeries ==
Player	Injury Date	Injury Type
Maalik Wayns	October 14, 2013	Left knee surgery (missed 33 games)
Matt Barnes	November 20, 2012	Retinal tear in left eye (missed 16 games)
Chris Paul	November 27, 2013	Strained right hamstring (missed 1 game)
JJ Redick	November 29, 2013	Fractured right hand (missed 21 games)
Reggie Bullock	December 8, 2013	Sprained left ankle (missed 18 games)
Chris Paul	January 3, 2014	Separated right shoulder (missed 19 games)
JJ Redick	February 5, 2014	Sore right hip & bulging disc on lower back (missed 25 games)
Jamal Crawford	March 1, 2014	Strained left calf (missed 3 games)
Jared Dudley	March 6, 2014	Mid-back spasms (missed 3 games)
Jamal Crawford	March 10, 2014	Strained left calf (missed 5 games)
Darren Collison	March 16, 2014	Stomach virus (missed 2 games)
Danny Granger	March 28, 2014	Strained left hamstring (missed 10 games)
Blake Griffin	March 29, 2014	Lower back spasms (missed 1 game)
Jamal Crawford	March 31, 2014	Strained left calf (missed 5 games)
Hedo Türkoğlu	April 29, 2014	Fractured lower back (missed rest of the playoffs)

== Player statistics ==
Legend
GP	Games played	GS	Games started	MPG	Minutes per game
FG%	Field-goal percentage	3P%	3-point field-goal percentage	FT%	Free-throw percentage
RPG	Rebounds per game	APG	Assists per game	SPG	Steals per game
BPG	Blocks per game	PPG	Points per game

=== Regular season ===
Player	GP	GS	MPG	FG%	3P%	FT%	RPG	APG	SPG	BPG	PPG
DeAndre Jordan	82	82	35.0	.676		.428	13.6	.9	1.0	2.5	10.4
Blake Griffin	80	80	35.8	.528	.273	.715	9.5	3.9	1.2	.6	24.1
Darren Collison	80	35	25.9	.467	.376	.857	2.4	3.7	1.2	.2	11.4
Jared Dudley	74	43	23.4	.438	.360	.655	2.2	1.4	.6	.1	6.9
Jamal Crawford	69	24	30.3	.416	.361	.866	2.3	3.2	.9	.2	18.6
Matt Barnes	63	40	27.5	.438	.343	.733	4.6	2.0	.9	.4	9.9
Chris Paul	62	62	35.0	.467	.368	.855	4.3	10.7	2.5	.1	19.1
Ryan Hollins	61	0	7.9	.736		.625	1.5	.1	.1	.5	2.3
Willie Green	55	9	15.8	.376	.339	.824	1.4	.9	.4	.2	5.0
Reggie Bullock	43	0	9.2	.355	.301	.778	1.3	.3	.2	.0	2.7
Hedo Türkoğlu	38	0	10.3	.385	.440	.500	2.3	.9	.5	.3	3.0
JJ Redick	35	34	28.2	.455	.395	.915	2.1	2.2	.8	.1	15.2
Byron Mullens^{†}	27	0	6.2	.406	.333	.333	1.2	.2	.2	.1	2.5
Glen Davis^{†}	23	1	13.4	.481	.000	.783	3.0	.3	.5	.3	4.2
Antawn Jamison	22	0	11.3	.315	.195	.720	2.5	.3	.4	.1	3.8
Danny Granger^{†}	12	0	16.2	.429	.353	.857	2.3	.7	.3	.3	8.0
Darius Morris^{†}	10	0	5.4	.308	.000	.500	.5	.5	.2	.0	.9
Stephen Jackson	9	0	11.9	.231	.071	.500	1.1	.6	.7	.1	1.7
Sasha Vujačić	2	0	5.0	.400	.500		1.5	.0	.5	.0	2.5
Maalik Wayns	2	0	4.5	.500			1.0	1.0	1.0	.0	1.0

=== Playoffs ===
Player	GP	GS	MPG	FG%	3P%	FT%	RPG	APG	SPG	BPG	PPG
Blake Griffin	13	13	36.8	.500	.143	.740	7.4	3.8	1.2	1.1	23.5
Chris Paul	13	13	36.3	.467	.457	.774	4.2	10.3	2.8	.0	19.8
DeAndre Jordan	13	13	34.0	.730		.434	12.5	.8	.9	2.5	9.6
Matt Barnes	13	13	31.1	.421	.317	.684	4.5	1.8	.9	.2	9.4
JJ Redick	13	13	27.0	.459	.400	.962	1.7	1.5	.8	.0	13.3
Jamal Crawford	13	0	24.1	.398	.342	.886	1.5	2.0	.9	.2	15.5
Darren Collison	13	0	19.2	.389	.083	.867	2.1	2.4	.5	.1	8.5
Glen Davis	13	0	12.2	.610			2.8	.7	.2	.2	3.8
Danny Granger	13	0	10.3	.275	.227	.778	1.5	.2	.5	.1	2.6
Jared Dudley	7	0	6.4	.273	.500		.9	.3	.1	.0	1.3
Hedo Türkoğlu	5	0	8.2	.462	.400		1.0	.2	.6	.0	3.2
Willie Green	5	0	3.8	.200	.250	1.000	1.4	.2	.6	.0	1.0
Ryan Hollins	5	0	1.8	.250		1.000	.6	.0	.0	.0	.6
Reggie Bullock	2	0	2.5	1.000			.0	.5	.0	.0	1.0

- ^{†} Denotes player spent time with another team in the season. Stats reflect time with the Clippers only.

== Transactions ==
=== Trades ===
June 25, 2013
To Los Angeles Clippers

Coach Doc Rivers

To Boston Celtics

2013 first-round draft pick

July 10, 2013
To Los Angeles Clippers

Jared Dudley

To Phoenix Suns

Eric Bledsoe

Caron Butler
July 10, 2013
To Los Angeles Clippers

JJ Redick

To Milwaukee Bucks

Two future second-round draft picks

February 20, 2014
To Los Angeles Clippers

Draft rights to Cenk Akyol

To Atlanta Hawks

Antawn Jamison

February 20, 2014
To Los Angeles Clippers

2014 second-round draft pick

To Philadelphia 76ers

Byron Mullens

2018 second-round draft pick

=== Free agents ===
==== Re-signed ====
Player	Signed	Contract
Chris Paul	July 10, 2013	Five-year deal
Matt Barnes	July 10, 2013	Three-year deal
Ryan Hollins	July 10, 2013	One-year deal

==== Additions ====
Player	Signed	Former team
Darren Collison	July 10, 2013	Dallas Mavericks
Byron Mullens	July 22, 2013	Charlotte Bobcats
Antawn Jamison	August 28, 2013	Los Angeles Lakers
Stephen Jackson	December 9, 2013	San Antonio Spurs
Darius Morris	January 6, 2014	Philadelphia 76ers
Hedo Türkoğlu	January 16, 2014	Orlando Magic
Sasha Vujacic	February 3, 2014	Anadolu Efes S.K. (TBL)
Glen Davis	February 24, 2014	Orlando Magic
Danny Granger	February 27, 2014	Indiana Pacers

==== Subtractions ====
Player	Reason left	New team
Grant Hill	Retired, June 1, 2013	Host of NBA Inside Stuff on NBATV
DaJuan Summers	Waived, July 9, 2013	Budivelnyk Kyiv (Ukrainian Basketball SuperLeague)
Chauncey Billups	Free agency, July 11, 2013	Detroit Pistons
Ronny Turiaf	Free agency, July 12, 2013	Minnesota Timberwolves
Maalik Wayns	Waived, January 5, 2014; Re-signed, January 7, 2014; Released, January 16, 2014	Rio Grande Valley Vipers (NBDL)
Stephen Jackson	Waived, January 7, 2014	Killer 3's (BIG3)
Darius Morris	Contract expired, January 26, 2014	Memphis Grizzlies
Sasha Vujacic	Contract expired, February 13, 2014	Reyer Venezia Mestre (Lega Basket Serie A)
Lamar Odom	Free agency, February 18, 2014	Laboral Kutxa (Liga ACB)
