= Mike Terpstra =

American basketball player and coach

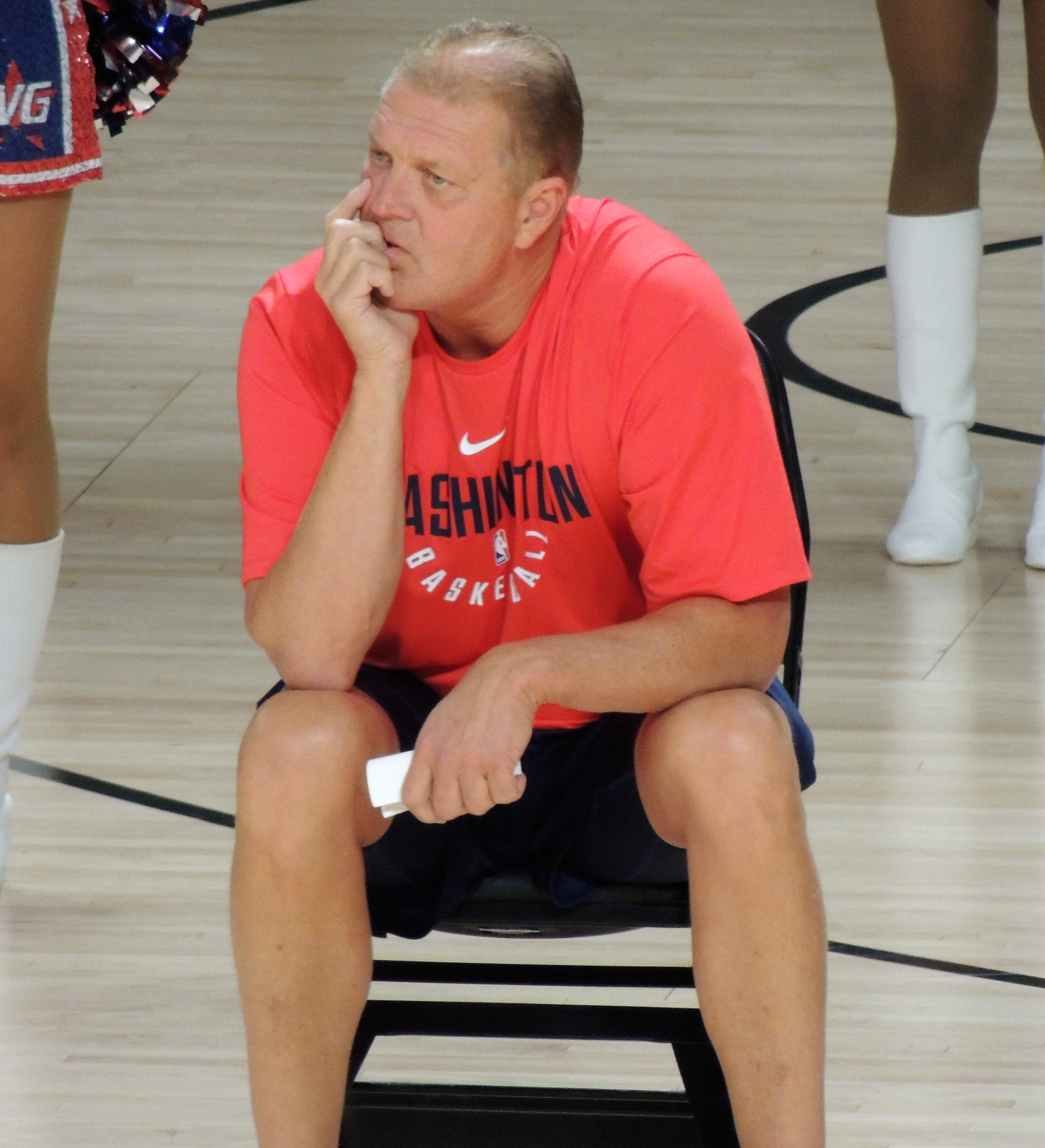
- Terpstra with the Washington Wizards in 2017

Personal information
- Listed height: 6 ft 8 in (2.03 m)
- Listed weight: 250 lb (113 kg)

Career information
- College: Northwest Nazarene

Career history

Coaching
- 1997–2000: Modesto JC
- 2000–2003: Stanislaus State
- 2004–2005: Northwest Nazarene
- 2005–2006: Idaho Stampede (assistant)
- 2006–2007: Colorado 14ers (volunteer asst.)
- 2013–2015: Oklahoma City Thunder (assistant)
- 2015–2016: Boise State (volunteer asst.)
- 2016–2021: Washington Wizards (assistant)

Mike Terpstra (born 1961), is an American basketball coach. He has previously served various positions with junior college, high school, and NBA Development League. He is the CEO of University Recruiting Group, an organization that assistants athletes and coaches through the recruiting process. He helped the Colorado 14ers win the Western Division championship before losing to the Dakota Wizards in the championship round.

== Ripon Christian High School ==
Terpstra helped lead the high school to three state championships (1992 and 1994 as head coach and 1988 as assistant coach).

== Northwest Nazarane University ==
During his tenure with Northwest Nazarane, he compiled a 17–10 record. That record was the best record the school has had as a Division II school.

== Oklahoma City Thunder ==
Terpstra began his tenure with the Thunder in the 2013–14 NBA season. The Thunder accumulated the best NBA record before the 2014 NBA All-Star Game so the 2013–14 Oklahoma City Thunder coaches coached the Western Conference All-Stars.

== Personal life ==
Terpstra attended the University of the Pacific and earned a Master's Degree in sports Science there.
