= 2014–15 Fenerbahçe S.K. (basketball) season =

Turkish professional basketball team season

Fenerbahçe Ülker
2014–15 season
- Chairman: (Turkey) Aziz Yıldırım
- Head coach: (Serbia) Željko Obradović
- Arena: Ülker Sports Arena
- Turkish Basketball League: 1st seed
- Playoffs: Semifinalist
- Euroleague: Fourth place
- Turkish Cup: Runners-up
- Presidential Cup: Runners-up
- PIR leader: (Serbia) Nemanja Bjelica 17.2
- Scoring leader: (Serbia) Bogdan Bogdanović 11.5
- Rebounding leader: (Serbia) Nemanja Bjelica 8.0
- Assists leader: (Turkey) Emir Preldžić 3.2

The 2014–15 season was Fenerbahçe's 101st season in the existence of the club. The team played in the Turkish Basketball League and in the Euroleague.

== Players ==
=== Squad information ===
Fenerbahçe Ülker roster
Players
Coaches

Pos.	No.	Nat.	Name	Ht.	Wt.	Age
G	0	(United States)	Goudelock, Andrew	1.91 m (6 ft 3 in)	91 kg (201 lb)	26 – 7 December 1988
G/F	1	(Greece)	Zisis, Nikos	1.97 m (6 ft 6 in)	98 kg (216 lb)	31 – 16 August 1983
G	3	(Georgia (country)) (United States)	Hickman, Ricky	1.89 m (6 ft 2 in)	88 kg (194 lb)	29 – 1 September 1985
PF	8	(Serbia)	Bjelica, Nemanja	2.09 m (6 ft 10 in)	106 kg (234 lb)	27 – 9 May 1988
F/C	9	(Turkey)	Erden, Semih	2.13 m (7 ft 0 in)	109 kg (240 lb)	28 – 28 July 1986
G	10	(Turkey)	Mahmutoğlu, Melih	1.91 m (6 ft 3 in)	85 kg (187 lb)	25 – 12 May 1990
SG	13	(Serbia)	Bogdanović, Bogdan	1.98 m (6 ft 6 in)	93 kg (205 lb)	22 – 18 August 1992
F	14	(Turkey)	Yurtseven, Ömer Faruk	2.06 m (6 ft 9 in)	105 kg (231 lb)	16 – 19 June 1998
SG	15	(Turkey)	Çetin, Serhat	1.97 m (6 ft 6 in)	94 kg (207 lb)	29 – 23 February 1986
C	21	(Turkey)	Savaş, Oğuz	2.13 m (7 ft 0 in)	132 kg (291 lb)	27 – 13 July 1987
F/C	22	(Croatia)	Žorić, Luka	2.11 m (6 ft 11 in)	110 kg (243 lb)	30 – 5 November 1984
PG	23	(Turkey)	Uğurlu, Berk	1.92 m (6 ft 4 in)	72 kg (159 lb)	19 – 27 April 1996
F/C	24	(Czech Republic)	Veselý, Jan	2.13 m (7 ft 0 in)	110 kg (243 lb)	25 – 24 April 1990
G	25	(Turkey)	Sipahi, Kenan	1.97 m (6 ft 6 in)	85 kg (187 lb)	20 – 26 May 1995
F	55	(Turkey) (Bosnia and Herzegovina)	Preldžić, Emir (C)	2.06 m (6 ft 9 in)	100 kg (220 lb)	27 – 6 September 1987

Head coach

- (Serbia) Željko Obradović

Assistant coach(es)

- (Spain) Josep Maria Izquierdo
- (Serbia) Vladimir Androić
- (Turkey) Erdem Can

Team manager

- (Italy) Maurizio Gherardini
- (Turkey) Cenk Renda

Legend

- (C) Team captain
- Injured

- Roster

=== Depth chart ===
Pos.	Starting 5	Bench 1	Bench 2	Bench 3
C	Oğuz Savaş	Luka Žorić	Semih Erden	Ömer Faruk Yurtseven
PF	Nemanja Bjelica	Jan Veselý
SF	Bogdan Bogdanović	Emir Preldžić	Serhat Çetin
SG	Andrew Goudelock	Melih Mahmutoğlu
PG	Ricky Hickman	Kenan Sipahi	Berk Uğurlu

=== Transactions ===
==== In ====
No.	Pos.	Nat.	Name	Age	Moving from		Ends	Date	Source
3	G	(United States)	Ricky Hickman	28	Maccabi Tel Aviv	(Israel)	June 2016	1 July 2014	
0	SG	(United States)	Andrew Goudelock	25	UNICS	(Russia)	June 2016	2 July 2014	
15	G/F	(Turkey)	Serhat Çetin	28	Tofaş	(Turkey)	June 2017	8 July 2014	
20	SG	(Turkey)	Can Altıntığ	27	Karşıyaka	(Turkey)	June 2017	9 July 2014	
13	G/F	(Serbia)	Bogdan Bogdanović	21	Partizan	(Serbia)	June 2018	11 July 2014	
9	C	(Turkey)	Semih Erden	27	Anadolu Efes	(Turkey)	June 2015	1 August 2014	
24	PF	(Czech Republic)	Jan Veselý	24	Denver Nuggets	(United States)	June 2016	5 August 2014	

==== Out ====
No.	Pos.	Nat.	Name	Age	Moving to		Date	Source
7	SG	(Turkey)	Ömer Onan	36	Retired		1 July 2014	
4	PG	(North Macedonia)	Bo McCalebb	29	Bayern Munich	(Germany)	1 July 2014	
11	F	(Lithuania)	Linas Kleiza	29	EA7 Milano	(Italy)	1 July 2014	
9	PG	(Turkey)	Barış Ermiş	29	Gaziantep Basketbol	(Turkey)	1 July 2014	
41	PF	(Turkey)	İlkan Karaman	24	Acıbadem Üniversitesi	(Turkey)	1 July 2014	
18	F/C	(Montenegro)	Blagota Sekulić	32	CB Canarias	(Spain)	1 July 2014	
44	PF	(Croatia)	Bojan Bogdanović	25	Brooklyn Nets	(United States)	31 July 2014	
13	C	(Slovenia)	Gašper Vidmar	26	Darüşşafaka	(Turkey)	9 September 2014	

== Overview ==
Competition	First match	Last match	Starting round	Final position	Record							
Competition	First match	Last match	Starting round	Final position	Pld	W	D	L	PF	PA	PD	Win %
Turkish Basketball League	14 October 2014	6 June 2015	Round 1	Semi-finals	37	26	0	11	3,018	2,718	+300	70.27
Euroleague	17 October 2014	17 May 2015	Round 1	Fourth place	26	19	0	7	2,136	2,002	+134	73.08
Turkish Cup	2 October 2014	22 February 2015	Group stage	Runnersup	6	5	0	1	454	408	+46	83.33
Presidential Cup	8 October 2014		Final	Runnersup	1	0	0	1	75	77	−2	0.00
Total					70	50	0	20	5,683	5,205	+478	71.43

Source: Competitions

=== Presidential Cup ===
8 October 2015
19:30

Report

Fenerbahçe Ülker	75–77	Pınar Karşıyaka
Scoring by quarter: 20–23, 21–17, 25–18, 9–19
Pts: Goudelock 18; Rebs: Preldžić 7 Asts: Preldžić 6		Pts: Palacios, Dixon 19; Rebs: Palacios 12; Asts: Gabriel 8

Ankara Arena, Ankara
Referees: Recep Ankaralı, Emin Moğulkoç, Rüştü Nuran

=== Turkish Basketball League ===
==== League table ====
Pos	Team	Pld	W	L	PF	PA	PD	Pts	Qualification or relegation
1	Fenerbahçe Ülker	30	23	7	2462	2189	+273	53	Qualification to playoffs
2	Anadolu Efes	30	22	8	2430	2183	+247	52	Qualification to playoffs
3	Darüşşafaka Doğuş	30	21	9	2384	2167	+217	51	Qualification to playoffs
4	Pınar Karşıyaka	30	19	11	2422	2288	+134	49	Qualification to playoffs
5	Banvit	30	16	14	2353	2315	+38	46	Qualification to playoffs
6	Trabzonspor Medical Park	30	16	14	2439	2394	+45	46	Qualification to playoffs
7	Türk Telekom	30	15	15	2378	2460	−82	45	Qualification to playoffs
8	Galatasaray Liv Hospital	30	15	15	2392	2392	0	45	Qualification to playoffs
9	Beşiktaş İntegral Forex	30	15	15	2357	2380	−23	45	
10	Royal Halı Gaziantep	30	14	16	2265	2233	+32	44	
11	Torku Konyaspor	30	12	18	2374	2512	−138	42	
12	İstanbul BB	30	12	18	2258	2429	−171	42	
13	Uşak Sportif	30	12	18	2340	2432	−92	42	
14	Rönesans TED Kolejliler	30	11	19	2383	2494	−111	41	
15	Eskişehir Basket (R)	30	9	21	2369	2546	−177	39	Relegation to TBL
16	Tofaş (R)	30	8	22	2255	2447	−192	38	Relegation to TBL

Source: TBL
(R) Relegated

==== Results summary ====
Overall						Home					Away				
Pld	W	L	PF	PA	PD	W	L	PF	PA	PD	W	L	PF	PA	PD
30	23	7	2462	2189	+273	12	3	1265	1115	+150	11	4	1197	1074	+123

Source: TBF.org.tr

==== Results by round ====
Round	1	2	3	4	5	6	7	8	9	10	11	12	13	14	15	16	17	18	19	20	21	22	23	24	25	26	27	28	29	30
Ground	A	H	A	H	A	H	A	H	A	H	A	H	A	H	H	H	A	H	A	H	A	H	A	H	A	H	A	H	A	A
Result	W	L	W	W	W	W	W	W	L	W	W	W	L	L	W	W	W	W	W	W	L	W	W	W	L	W	W	L	W	W
Position	1	6	6	4	2	1	1	1	2	2	2	1	1	3	2	2	1	1	1	1	1	1	1	1	1	1	1	1	1	1

Source: TBF.org.tr
A = Away; H = Home; W = Win; L = Loss

=== Euroleague ===
==== Group C regular season ====
===== Standing =====
Pos	Team	Pld	W	L	PF	PA	PD
1	(Spain) FC Barcelona (A)	10	9	1	861	738	+123
2	(Turkey) Fenerbahçe Ülker (A)	10	8	2	843	787	+56
3	(Greece) Panathinaikos (A)	10	5 (Note: Tiebreaker: 1–1 (+25))	5	768	743	+25
4	(Italy) EA7 Milano (A)	10	5 (Note: Tiebreaker: 1–1 (–25))	5	775	795	−20
5	(Germany) Bayern Munich (E)	10	2	8	806	866	−60
6	(Poland) PGE Turów (E)	10	1	9	773	897	−124

(A) Advance to Top 16; (E) Enter 2014–15 Eurocup Basketball last 32 round

===== Fixtures/results =====
All times given below are in Central European Time.

17 October 2014
21:00

Report

Fenerbahçe Ülker (Turkey)	77–74	(Italy) EA7 Milano
Scoring by quarter: 26–15, 15–28, 16-15, 20-16
Pts: Goudelock 19; Rebs: Veselý 9 Asts: Goudelock, Bogdanović 4		Pts: Gentile 15; Rebs: Samuels 9 Asts: Hackett 4

Ülker Sports Arena, Istanbul
Attendance: 9,846
Referees: Christos Christodoulou (GRE), Olegs Latisevs (LAT), Emilio Perez Pizarro (ESP)

23 October 2014
21:00

Report

PGE Turów (Poland)	76–91	(Turkey) Fenerbahçe Ülker
Scoring by quarter: 15-30, 25-20, 20-19, 16-22
Pts: Kulig 23; Rebs: Kulig 8 Asts: Jaramaz 4		Pts: Goudelock 27; Rebs: Savaş 7 Asts: Bjelica, Preldžić 4

CRS Hala Zielona Góra, Zielona Góra
Attendance: 1,773
Referees: Fernando Rocha (POR), Eddie Viator (FRA), Sergiy Chebyshev (UKR)

30 October 2014
20:30

Report

Panathinaikos (Greece)	91–73	(Turkey) Fenerbahçe Ülker
Scoring by quarter: 31-19, 28-17, 23-21, 9-16
Pts: Slaughter 23; Rebs: Fotsis 6 Asts: Diamantidis 10		Pts: Bjelica 16; Rebs: Veselý 8 Asts: Preldžić 5

O.A.C.A., Athens
Attendance: 14,500
Referees: Miguel Perez Perez (ESP), Borys Ryshyk (UKR), Tomasz Teawicki (POL)

6 November 2014
20:45

Report

Fenerbahçe Ülker (Turkey)	78–80	(Spain) FC Barcelona
Scoring by quarter: 21-19, 20-22, 19-23, 18-16
Pts: Žorić 18; Rebs: Žorić 10; Asts: Bjelica 4		Pts: Oleson 16; Rebs: Lampe 8 Asts: Huertas 6

Ülker Sports Arena, Istanbul
Attendance: 10,108
Referees: Luigi Lamonica(ITA), Matej Boltauzer(SLO), Elias Koromilas(GRE)

13 November 2014
20:15

Report

Bayern Munich (Germany)	86–93	(Turkey) Fenerbahçe Ülker
Scoring by quarter: 22-19, 22-31, 16-19, 26-24
Pts: Đedović, Micić 16; Rebs: Bryant, Micić, Savanović 5 Asts: Schaffartzik 8		Pts: Goudelock 34; Rebs: Bjelica 7 Asts: Bogdanović 7

Audi Dome, Munich
Attendance: 6700
Referees: Sasa Pukl (SLO), Emilio Perez Pizarro (ESP), Oscar Perea (ESP)

20 November 2014
21:00

Report

EA7 Milano (Italy)	74–80	(Turkey) Fenerbahçe Ülker
Scoring by quarter: 23-21, 14-23, 12-18, 25-18
Pts: Brooks 17; Rebs: Hackett 10; Asts: Ragland 6		Pts: Hickman 14; Rebs: Bjelica 8 Asts: Goudelock 5

PalaDesio, Desio
Attendance: 7,000
Referees: Fernando Rocha (POR), Sreten Radovic (CRO), Sergiy Zashchuk (UKR)

27 November 2014
19:15

Report

Fenerbahçe Ülker (Turkey)	89–74	(Poland) PGE Turów
Scoring by quarter: 26-12, 22-24, 17-17, 24-21
Pts: Goudelock 21; Rebs: Bjelica 10; Asts: Bogdanović, Hickman 5		Pts: Moldoveanu 16; Rebs: Kulig 10; Asts: Taylor 9

Ülker Sports Arena, Istanbul
Attendance: 6,476
Referees: Dani Hierrezuelo (ESP), Petar Obradovic (BIH), Milos Koljensic (MNE)

4 December 2014
19:00

Report

Fenerbahçe Ülker (Turkey)	84–62	(Greece) Panathinaikos
Scoring by quarter: 18-18, 18-14, 31-16, 17-14
Pts: Goudelock 18; Rebs: Bogdanović 8 Asts: Bogdanović 4		Pts: Slaughter 20; Rebs: Gist, Fotsis 4 Asts: Gist 5

Ülker Sports Arena, Istanbul
Attendance: 12,473
Referees: Robert Lottermoser(GER), Antonio Conde(ESP), Tomas Jasevicius(LTU)

11 December 2014
20:45

Report

FC Barcelona (Spain)	89–91 (OT)	(Turkey) Fenerbahçe Ülker
Scoring by quarter: 23-25, 14-17, 24-17, 18-20, Overtime: 10-12
Pts: Huertas 25; Rebs: Doellman 6 Asts: Huertas 5		Pts: Bogdanović 23; Rebs: Veselý 10; Asts: Sipahi 5

Palau Blaugrana, Barcelona
Attendance: 4,632
Referees: Ilija Belosevic (SRB), Jakub Zamojski (POL), Carmelo Paternico (ITA)

18 December 2014
19:00

Report

Fenerbahçe Ülker (Turkey)	87–81	(Germany) Bayern Munich
Scoring by quarter: 21-16, 21-17, 22-23, 23-25
Pts: Bogdanović 16; Rebs: Bjelica 6 Asts: Bogdanović 4		Pts: Đedović 19; Rebs: Štimac 8 Asts: McCalebb 5

Ülker Sports Arena, Istanbul
Attendance: 10,483
Referees: Grzegorz Ziemblicki (POL), Boris Sulga (UKR), Ingus Baumanis (LAT)

===== Statistics =====
PPG	(United States) Andrew Goudelock (16.9)
RPG	(Serbia) Nemanja Bjelica (5.7)
APG	(Serbia) Bogdan Bogdanović (3.4)

Updated to game played on 18 December 2014

==== Group F Top 16 ====
===== Standing =====
Pos	Team	Pld	W	L	PF	PA	PD
1	(Russia) CSKA Moscow (A)	14	12	2	1227	1114	+113
2	(Turkey) Fenerbahçe Ülker (A)	14	11	3	1126	1033	+93
3	(Greece) Olympiacos (A)	14	10	4	1075	1007	+68
4	(Turkey) Anadolu Efes (A)	14	6 (Note: Tiebreaker: 1–1 (+2))	8	1102	1132	−30
5	(Spain) Laboral Kutxa (E)	14	6 (Note: Tiebreaker: 1–1 (–2))	8	1155	1164	−9
6	(Italy) EA7 Milano (E)	14	4 (Note: Tiebreaker: 2–0)	10	1083	1193	−110
7	(Spain) Unicaja (E)	14	4 (Note: Tiebreaker: 0–2)	10	1079	1140	−61
8	(Russia) Nizhny Novgorod (E)	14	3	11	1121	1185	−64

(A) Advance to Playoffs; (E) Eliminated

===== Fixtures/results =====
All times given below are in Central European Time.

2 January 2015
19:00

Report

Fenerbahçe Ülker (Turkey)	81–84 (OT)	(Russia) CSKA Moscow
Scoring by quarter: 25–28, 17–17, 17–16, 15–13, Overtime: 7–10
Pts: Goudelock 19; Rebs: Bjelica 11; Asts: Zisis 6		Pts: Hines, Weems 13; Rebs: Vorontsevich 10; Asts: Teodosić, Weems 6

Ülker Sports Arena, Istanbul
Attendance: 12,713
Referees: Dani Hierrezuelo (ESP), Miguel Perez Perez (ESP), Damir Javor (SLO)

9 January 2015
17:30

Report

Nizhny Novgorod (Russia)	60–78	(Turkey) Fenerbahçe Ülker
Scoring by quarter: 19–20, 17–18, 15–22, 9–18
Pts: Kinsey 16; Rebs: Thompkins, Antonov 6 Asts: Khvostov 4		Pts: Goudelock 23; Rebs: Bjelica 10; Asts: Preldžić, Savaş 3

Trade Union Sport Palace, Nizhny Novgorod
Attendance: 3,000
Referees: Jose Ramon Garcia Ortiz (ESP), Robert Lottermoser (GER), Anastasios Piloidis (GRE)

16 January 2015
19:00

Report

Fenerbahçe Ülker (Turkey)	68–74	(Greece) Olympiacos
Scoring by quarter: 22–16, 14–27, 16–13, 16–18
Pts: Goudelock 23; Rebs: Bjelica 6 Asts: Zisis 4		Pts: Lojeski 18; Rebs: Lojeski 8 Asts: Spanoulis 6

Ülker Sports Arena, Istanbul
Attendance: 12,918
Referees: Borys Ryzhyk (UKR), Fernando Rocha (POR), Carlos Peruga (ESP)

22 January 2015
20:45

Report

EA7 Milano (Italy)	71–82	(Turkey) Fenerbahçe Ülker
Scoring by quarter: 24 - 28, 14 - 15, 16 - 20, 17 - 19
Pts: Brooks 24; Rebs: Hackett 10; Asts: Brooks 3		Pts: Veselý 15; Rebs: Bjelica 9 Asts: Bogdanović 8

Mediolanum Forum, Milan
Attendance: 8,800
Referees: Christos Christodoulou (GRE), Joseph Bissang (FRA), Petros Papapetrou (GRE)

30 January 2015
20:45

Report

Unicaja Málaga (Spain)	60–68	(Turkey) Fenerbahçe Ülker
Scoring by quarter: 19-16, 11-12, 10-21, 20-19
Pts: Stefansson 13; Rebs: Kuzminskas 9 Asts: Granger 4		Pts: Goudelock 20; Rebs: Bjelica 13; Asts: Preldžić, Zisis 4

Martín Carpena, Málaga
Attendance: 7,411
Referees: Sasa Pukl (SLO), Spiros Gkontas (GRE), Tomas Jasevicius (LTU)

6 February 2015
19:00

Report

Fenerbahçe Ülker (Turkey)	91–90	(Spain) Laboral Kutxa
Scoring by quarter: 20–21, 25–22, 26–22, 20–25
Pts: Goudelock 19; Rebs: Bjelica 15; Asts: Preldžić, Zisis 4		Pts: San Emeterio 15; Rebs: Bertāns, Tillie 5 Asts: Adams 6

Ülker Sports Arena, Istanbul
Attendance: 12,589
Referees: Robert Lottermoser (GER), Srdan Dozai (CRO), Panagiotis Anastopoulos (GRE)

13 February 2015
19:15

Report

Anadolu Efes (Turkey)	71–77	(Turkey) Fenerbahçe Ülker
Scoring by quarter: 11-13, 22-23, 20-18, 18-23
Pts: Heurtel 17; Rebs: Perperoglou 5 Asts: Heurtel 5		Pts: Bjelica, Veselý 14; Rebs: Bjelica 7 Asts: Preldžić 8

Abdi İpekçi Arena, Istanbul
Attendance: 10,111
Referees: Borys Ryzhyk (UKR), Jakub Zamojski (POL), Benjamin Jimenez (ESP)

27 February 2015
18:00

Report

CSKA Moscow (Russia)	75–81	(Turkey) Fenerbahçe Ülker
Scoring by quarter: 10–17, 27–22, 21–20, 17–22
Pts: De Colo 18; Rebs: Hines 5 Asts: Teodosic, Weems 6		Pts: Goudelock, Veselý 14; Rebs: Bjelica 13; Asts: Goudelock, Preldžić 3

Universal Sports Hall, Moscow
Attendance: 5,000
Referees: Luigi Lamonica (ITA), Miguel Perez Perez (ESP), Elias Koromilas (GRE)

5 March 2015
19:00

Report

Fenerbahçe Ülker (Turkey)	92–79	(Russia) Nizhny Novgorod
Scoring by quarter: 18-17, 32-17, 12-21, 30-24
Pts: Bjelica 16; Rebs: Bjelica 7 Asts: Zisis 7		Pts: Thompkins 22; Rebs: Thompkins 11; Asts: Mekel 6

Ülker Sports Arena, Istanbul
Attendance: 10,037
Referees: Matej Boltauzer (SLO), Paolo Taurino (ITA), Spiros Gkontas (GRE)

13 March 2015
20:45

Report

Olympiacos (Greece)	64–73	(Turkey) Fenerbahçe Ülker
Scoring by quarter: 19-19, 16-20, 15-16, 14-18
Pts: Lafayette 14; Rebs: Dunston 5 Asts: Spanoulis 10		Pts: Goudelock 24; Rebs: Bjelica 9 Asts: Zisis 4

Peace and Friendship Stadium, Piraeus
Attendance: 11,500
Referees: Dani Hierrezuelo (ESP), Olegs Latisevs (LAT), Carlos Cortes (ESP)

20 March 2015
19:00

Report

Fenerbahçe Ülker (Turkey)	98–77	(Italy) EA7 Milano
Scoring by quarter: 22–14, 20–31, 23–16, 33–16
Pts: Bogdanović 25; Rebs: Bjelica, Veselý 9 Asts: Bjelica 6		Pts: Brooks 21; Rebs: Kleiza, Samuels 4 Asts: Brooks 5

Ülker Sports Arena, Istanbul
Attendance: 12,687
Referees: Sreten Radovic (CRO), Antonio Conde (ESP), Tomas Jasevicius (LTU)

26 March 2015
19:00

Report

Fenerbahçe Ülker (Turkey)	78–63	(Spain) Unicaja Málaga
Scoring by quarter: 19-21, 20-12, 24-12, 15-18
Pts: Goudelock 22; Rebs: Bjelica 11; Asts: Zisis 5		Pts: Toolson 14; Rebs: Thomas 7 Asts: Marković 4

Ülker Sports Arena, Istanbul
Attendance: 8,963
Referees: Robert Lottermoser (GER), Marek Cmikiewicz (POL), Petros Papapetou (GRE)

2 April 2015
21:00

Report

Laboral Kutxa (Spain)	93–76	(Turkey) Fenerbahçe Ülker
Scoring by quarter: 21–14, 21–15, 19–18, 32–29
Pts: James 19; Rebs: Iverson 8 Asts: San Emeterio 5		Pts: Bjelica 17; Rebs: Bjelica 10; Asts: Goudelock, Zisis 4

Fernando Buesa Arena, Vitoria-Gasteiz
Attendance: 10,536
Referees: Fernando Rocha (POR), Matej Boltauzer (SLO), Roberto Chiari (ITA)

9 April 2015
19:00

Report

Fenerbahçe Ülker (Turkey)	83–72	(Turkey) Anadolu Efes
Scoring by quarter: 23–12, 18–21, 18–22, 24–17
Pts: Goudelock 24; Rebs: Bjelica 11; Asts: Preldžić 4		Pts: Batuk 12; Rebs: Šarić, Krstić 7 Asts: Heurtel 8

Ülker Sports Arena, Istanbul
Attendance: 11,753 (Tentative)
Referees: Luigi Lamonica (ITA), Elias Koromilas (GRE), Damir Javor (SLO)

===== Statistics =====
PPG	(United States) Andrew Goudelock (16.6)
RPG	(Serbia) Nemanja Bjelica (10.1)
APG	(Greece) Nikolaos Zisis (3.5)

Updated to game played on 9 April 2015

==== Quarter-finals ====
Team 1	Agg.	Team 2	1st leg	2nd leg	3rd leg	4th leg	5th leg
Fenerbahçe Ülker (Turkey)	3–0	(Israel) Maccabi Tel Aviv	80–72	82–67	75–74		

===== Fixtures/results =====
All times given below are in Central European Time.

14 April 2015
20:00

Report

Fenerbahçe Ülker (Turkey)	80–72	(Israel) Maccabi Tel Aviv
Scoring by quarter: 16–22, 22–20, 21–16, 21–14
Pts: Veselý 23; Rebs: Bjelica 12; Asts: Preldžić 5		Pts: Pargo 25; Rebs: Tyus 11; Asts: Pargo 8

Ülker Sports Arena, Istanbul
Attendance: 12,894 (Tentative)
Referees: Christos Christodoulou (GRE), Antonio Conde (ESP), Joseph Bissang (FRA)

16 April 2015
20:00

Report

Fenerbahçe Ülker (Turkey)	82–67	(Israel) Maccabi Tel Aviv
Scoring by quarter: 30–14, 20–20, 18–19, 14–14
Pts: Goudelock 19; Rebs: Bjelica 15; Asts: Preldžić, Zisis 4		Pts: Pargo 16; Rebs: Linhart, Tyus, Randle 5 Asts: Pargo, Randle 4

Ülker Sports Arena, Istanbul
Attendance: 12,907 (Tentative)
Referees: Sreten Radovic (CRO), Panagiotis Anastopoulos (GRE), Benjamin Jimenez (ESP)

20 April 2015
20:05

Report

Maccabi Tel Aviv (Israel)	74–75 (OT)	(Turkey) Fenerbahçe Ülker
Scoring by quarter: 20–13, 11–24, 14–13, 20–15, Overtime: 9–10
Pts: Pargo 21; Rebs: Randle 10; Asts: Ohayon 4		Pts: Zisis 19; Rebs: Preldžić 9 Asts: Zisis 5

Menora Mivtachim Arena, Tel Aviv
Attendance: 11,060 (Tentative)
Referees: Borys Ryzhyk (UKR), Juan Carlos Garcia Gonzales (ESP), Elias Koromilas (GRE)

==== Final Four ====
===== Semifinal =====
All times are CEST (UTC+2).

15 May 2015
21:00

Boxscore

Real Madrid (Spain)	96–87	(Turkey) Fenerbahçe Ülker
Scoring by quarter: 20–21, 35–14, 21–24, 20–28
Pts: Ayón 18; Rebs: Ayón 7 Asts: Llull 9 PIR: Ayón 30		Pts: Goudelock 26; Rebs: Goudelock, Veselý 6 Asts: Bogdanović, Goudelock 4 PIR: Veselý 31

Barclaycard Center, Madrid
Attendance: 12,634
Referees: Christos Christodolou (GRE), Sasa Pukl (SLO), Robert Lottermoser (GER)

===== Third-place game =====
17 May 2015
17:00

Boxscore

Fenerbahçe Ülker (Turkey)	80–86	(Russia) CSKA Moscow
Scoring by quarter: 13–27, 11–21, 31–18, 25–20
Pts: Goudelock 24; Rebs: Bjelica 10; Asts: Zisis 6 PIR: Bjelica 26		Pts: De Colo 17; Rebs: Kirilenko, Kaun 6 Asts: Jackson 6 PIR: Jackson 18

Barclaycard Center, Madrid
Attendance: 9,849
Referees: Dani Hierrezuelo (ESP), Robert Lottermoser (GER), Olegs Latisevs (LAT)

==== Individual awards ====
Euroleague MVP

- (Serbia) Nemanja Bjelica

All-Euroleague First Team

- (Serbia) Nemanja Bjelica

All-Euroleague Second Team

- (United States) Andrew Goudelock

Euroleague Rising Star

- (Serbia) Bogdan Bogdanović

Euroleague MVP of the Month

- (Serbia) Nemanja Bjelica, March

Euroleague Weekly MVPs

- (United States) Andrew Goudelock - Regular Season, Week 2
- (United States) Andrew Goudelock - Regular Season, Week 5
- (Serbia) Bogdan Bogdanović - Top 16, Week 11

=== Turkish Basketball Cup ===
==== Group C ====
===== Standing =====
Pos	Team	Pld	W	L	PF	PA	PD	Pts	Qualification or relegation
1	Fenerbahçe Ülker	3	3	0	247	197	+50	6	Advance to Final 8
2	Rönesans TED Kolejliler	3	2	1	220	228	−8	5	Advance to Final 8
3	İstanbul BB	3	1	2	213	246	−33	4	
4	Tofaş	3	0	3	240	249	−9	3	

Source: Turkish Basketball Federation

===== Matches =====
2 October 2014
20:00

Report

Fenerbahçe Ülker	83–56	Rönesans TED Kolejliler

Sakarya Sports Hall, Sakarya

3 October 2014
20:00

Report

Tofaş	76–79	Fenerbahçe Ülker

Sakarya Sports Hall, Sakarya

4 October 2014
19:00

Report

İstanbul BB	65–85	Fenerbahçe Ülker

Sakarya Sports Hall, Sakarya

==== Quarterfinals ====
18 February 2015
19:30

Report

Gaziantep Basketbol	72–73	Fenerbahçe Ülker
Scoring by quarter: 23–23, 16–18, 17–15, 16–17
Pts: Lorbek 14; Rebs: Calloway 6 Asts: Calloway 7		Pts: Bjelica 18; Rebs: Veselý 12; Asts: Sipahi, Preldžić 3

Karataş Şahinbey Sport Hall, Gaziantep

==== Semifinals ====
20 February 2015
17:00

Report

Pınar Karşıyaka	69–74	Fenerbahçe Ülker
Scoring by quarter: 21–16, 19–12, 13–27, 16–19

Karataş Şahinbey Sport Hall, Gaziantep

==== Final ====
22 February 2015
20:30

Boxscore

Fenerbahçe Ülker	60–70	Anadolu Efes
Scoring by quarter: 15–15, 17–22, 14–18, 13–19
Pts: Veselý 13; Rebs: Veselý 9 Asts: Goudelock 4		Pts: Šarić 17; Rebs: Krstić 12; Asts: Heurtel 6

Karataş Şahinbey Sport Hall, Gaziantep
Referees: Recep Ankaralı, Murat Biricik, Rüştü Nuran
