= Kevin Love =

American basketball player (born 1988)

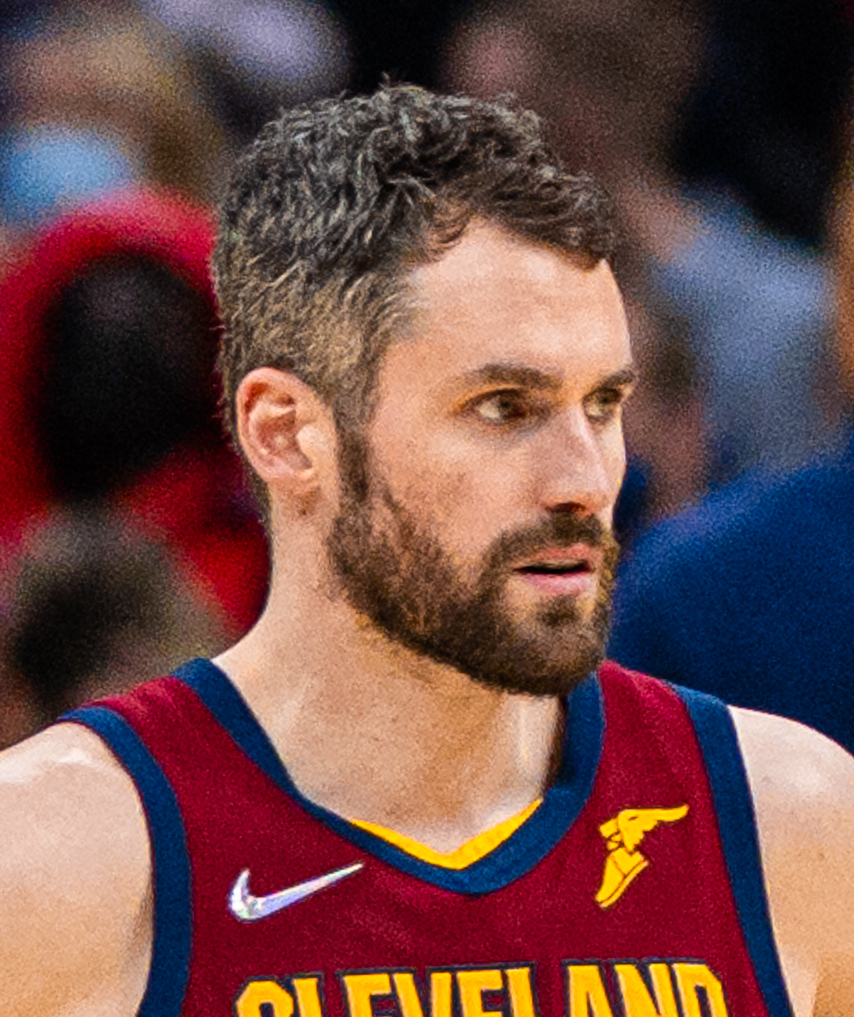
- Love with the Cleveland Cavaliers in 2022

Free agent
- Position: Power forward / center

Personal information
- Born: September 7, 1988 (age 38) Santa Monica, California, U.S.
- Listed height: 6 ft 10 in (2.08 m)
- Listed weight: 251 lb (114 kg)

Career information
- High school: Lake Oswego (Lake Oswego, Oregon)
- College: UCLA (2007–2008)
- NBA draft: 2008: 1st round, 5th overall pick
- Drafted by: Memphis Grizzlies
- Playing career: 2008–present

Career history
- 2008–2014: Minnesota Timberwolves
- 2014–2023: Cleveland Cavaliers
- 2023–2025: Miami Heat
- 2025–2026: Utah Jazz

Career highlights
- NBA champion (2016); 5× NBA All-Star (2011, 2012, 2014, 2017, 2018); 2× All-NBA Second Team (2012, 2014); NBA Most Improved Player (2011); NBA All-Rookie Second Team (2009); NBA Three-Point Contest champion (2012); NBA rebounding leader (2011); Consensus first-team All-American (2008); Pac-10 Player of the Year (2008); First-team All-Pac-10 (2008); National high school player of the year (2007); McDonald's All-American (2007); 2× First-team Parade All-American (2006, 2007)
- Stats at NBA.com
- Stats at Basketball Reference
Medals
Men's basketball
Representing United States
Olympic Games
Gold medal – first place	2012 London	Team
FIBA World Championship
Gold medal – first place	2010 Turkey	Team

Kevin Wesley Love (born September 7, 1988) is an American professional basketball player who most recently played for the Utah Jazz of the National Basketball Association (NBA). He is a five-time All-Star and a two-time member of the All-NBA Second Team, winning an NBA championship with the Cleveland Cavaliers in 2016. He was also a member of the gold medal-winning United States national team at the 2010 FIBA World Championship and the 2012 Summer Olympics. In 2011, Love won the NBA Most Improved Player Award and led the league in rebounding.

The son of former NBA player Stan Love, Love was a top-ranked prospect out of Lake Oswego High School in Oregon. He played one season of college basketball for the UCLA Bruins and led the team to a Final Four appearance in the 2008 NCAA tournament. Love was named a consensus First Team All-American and was voted player of the year in the Pac-10 Conference (now Pac-12). He elected to forgo his remaining three years of college eligibility and entered the 2008 NBA draft. He was taken fifth overall by the Memphis Grizzlies, and was traded to the Minnesota Timberwolves on draft night for the third overall selection, O. J. Mayo, in an eight-player deal. During the 2010–11 season, Love established the longest streak for consecutive games recording double figures in points and rebounds since the ABA–NBA merger.

After six seasons with Minnesota, Love was traded to the Cavaliers in 2014. After making four straight NBA Finals with the team and winning a championship, Love suffered multiple injuries from 2018 to 2021. He slotted into a reserve role in 2021–22 and finished as runner-up for the Sixth Man of the Year award. However, reduced playing time the following season led Love to reach a contract buyout agreement with the Cavaliers. After nine seasons with Cleveland, he joined Miami in February 2023, where he reached his fifth NBA Finals in as many playoff appearances.

== Early life ==
Love was born on September 7, 1988, in Santa Monica, California, the second of three children to Karen and Stan Love. He grew up in Lake Oswego, Oregon, where he was childhood friends and Little League teammates with fellow future NBA star Klay Thompson. Love played basketball from his earliest days; as a child, he would practice his bounce passes with a cardboard box and study tapes of Wes Unseld. His father Stan, a former NBA big man who was an adept shooter, had his son develop his outside shooting and ballhandling skills.

Love played high school basketball for the Lake Oswego Lakers. In his sophomore season, he averaged 25.3 points, 15.4 rebounds, and 3.7 assists per game, leading the Lakers to the 2005 state championship game, where they lost to Jesuit High School. The following summer, Nike removed him from its Portland Elite Legends AAU team after he chose to participate in the Reebok ABCD Camp against other top recruits. He went on to play for the Southern California All-Stars, helping the team compile a 46–0 record while garnering three MVP awards. In his junior year, he averaged 28 points, 16.1 rebounds, and 3.5 assists per game as Lake Oswego returned to the state championship game, this time winning behind Love's 24 points and 9 rebounds. In his senior season, he averaged 33.9 points, 17.0 rebounds, and 4 assists per game. Lake Oswego made their third straight trip to the state championship game, losing in a rematch of the prior year's final to South Medford High School and Love's rival Kyle Singler despite 37 points from Love. At the conclusion of the season, Love was named the Gatorade National Male Athlete of the Year. He was also a first-team Parade All-American. He finished his high school career as the all-time leading scorer in Oregon boys' basketball history, with 2,628 points.

College recruiting
Name	Hometown	School	Height	Weight	Commit date
Kevin Love; C	Lake Oswego, Oregon	Lake Oswego High	6 ft 9 in (2.06 m)	240 lb (110 kg)	Jul 25, 2006
Kevin Love; C	Recruit ratings: Scout: Rivals: 247Sports: (99)				
Overall recruit ranking: Scout: 1 (C); 12 (school) Rivals: 2 (state); 6 (national)
Note: In many cases, Scout, Rivals, 247Sports, On3, and ESPN may conflict in their listings of height and weight.; In these cases, the average was taken. ESPN grades are on a 100-point scale.; Sources: "2007 UCLA Basketball Commitment List". Rivals. Archived from the original on February 27, 2017.; "2007 UCLA College Basketball Team Recruiting Prospects". Scout. Archived from the original on February 27, 2017.; "UCLA Bruins 2007 Player Commits". ESPN.; "Scout.com Team Recruiting Rankings". Scout.; "2007 Team Ranking". Rivals.

== College career ==
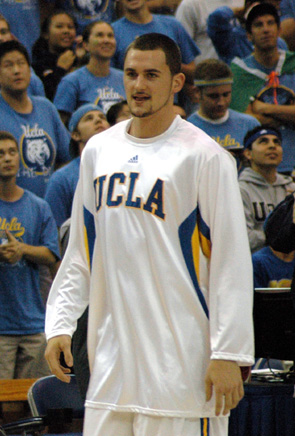
Love in 2008 at UCLA

In July 2006, Love verbally committed to play college basketball at UCLA. He had also considered playing for North Carolina. Before the 2007–08 season, he received permission from Walt Hazzard to wear number 42 for the Bruins even though the school had retired the number for Hazzard in 1996. After arriving at UCLA, Love regularly sought out retired Bruins legends Bill Walton and John Wooden for advice. His decision to play for UCLA brought anger from fans of Oregon, his father's alma mater, where it was expected Love would play. Prior to a game at Oregon, Ducks fans obtained Love's cell phone number and left obscene messages as well as death threats; the fans also subjected Love's family to obscenities and threw garbage at them during the game. This event, along with similar incidents directed at other players, prompted a discussion of whether abuse by college basketball fans is becoming too extreme.

In the 2008 Pacific-10 Conference men's basketball tournament, the Bruins defeated the USC Trojans, featuring O. J. Mayo, in the semi-finals. Both Mayo and Love were nominated to the All-Pac-10 tournament team. Later, Love guided UCLA to the regular season Pac-10 conference championship, the conference tournament championship, and a No. 1 seed in the 2008 NCAA Men's Division I Basketball Tournament. Love helped the Bruins to the Final Four of the tournament, where they lost to the Memphis Tigers, whose season and tournament appearance, in turn, were later vacated. At the end of the 2007–08 regular season, Love was named consensus first-team All-American, Pac-10 Player of the Year, All-Pac-10, and Pac-10 Freshman of the Year. He led the Bruins with 17.5 ppg, 10.6 rpg, and 23 double-doubles.

== Professional career ==
=== Minnesota Timberwolves (2008–2014) ===
==== Rookie season (2008–2009) ====
In a press conference on April 17, 2008, Love announced his intention to leave UCLA to enter the 2008 NBA draft. He was taken fifth overall by the Memphis Grizzlies, immediately after his teammate at UCLA, Russell Westbrook, who was selected by the Seattle SuperSonics. Following the draft, Love was traded, along with Mike Miller, Brian Cardinal, and Jason Collins to the Minnesota Timberwolves, with the third overall pick O. J. Mayo, Antoine Walker, Marko Jarić and Greg Buckner going to the Grizzlies. Love went on to play in the 2008 NBA Summer League and led all players in rebounding.

In his NBA debut on October 29, Love came off the bench to contribute 12 points and nine rebounds in a 98–96 win over the Sacramento Kings. The Timberwolves lost 15 of their first 19 games, prompting the dismissal of head coach Randy Wittman. Timberwolves general manager Kevin McHale assumed duties as head coach and they developed a close relationship. Under McHale, the Timberwolves improved their play in January by going 10–4, with Love averaging a double-double. Love was not selected to the NBA All-Star Weekend Rookie Challenge, to the surprise of his teammates and coaches. After the team's leading scorer Al Jefferson was sidelined for the rest of the season with a torn ACL in February, Love's minutes increased, and he was named NBA Rookie of the Month for March. Love finished the season ninth in the league in rebounding, first among rookies, and ranked third in total offensive rebounds. Love also led all first-years with 29 double-doubles, the most by a Timberwolves rookie in franchise history. He also ranked first in the league in offensive rebound percentage, becoming the first rookie to lead the league since Hakeem Olajuwon in 1984–85. Love was named to the 2009 NBA All-Rookie Second Team and finished sixth in Rookie of the Year voting.

==== Sophomore season (2009–2010) ====
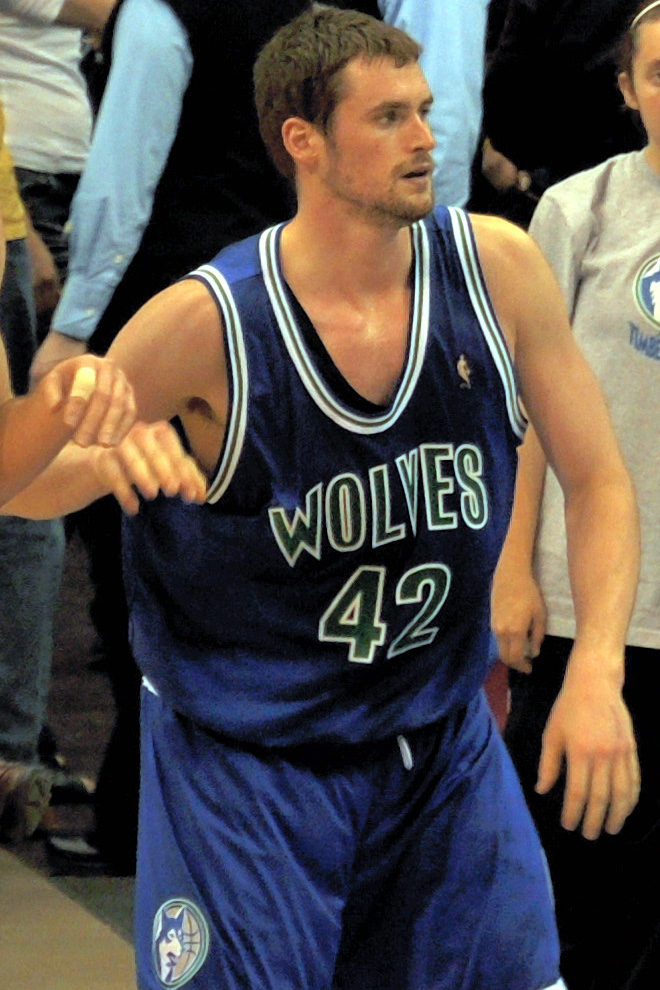
Love in 2010

In the off-season, Love was invited to participate in the USA National Team mini-camp that was conducted from July 22 to 25 in Las Vegas. Love also generated attention from his Twitter account when he broke the story that Kevin McHale would not return to coach the Timberwolves for the 2009–2010 season.

Love began the season on the injured list when, in a pre-season game on October 16, 2009, against the Chicago Bulls, he broke the fourth metacarpal in his left hand by banging it against the elbow of teammate Oleksiy Pecherov. Following surgery, Love missed the first 18 games of the season. He returned against the New Orleans Hornets on December 4, 2009, and made immediate impact for the Timberwolves, who were struggling out of the gate with a 2–16 record.

Love was selected to play in NBA All-Star Weekend Rookie Challenge. He finished the season ranked as the NBA's best rebounder per 48 minutes (18.4), besting Dwight Howard (18.3) and Marcus Camby (18.1). He attempted nearly two three-point field goals per game, which accounted for 16 percent of his overall field goal attempts, an increase over his rookie rate of 3 percent.

==== First All-Star and Most Improved Player (2010–2011) ====
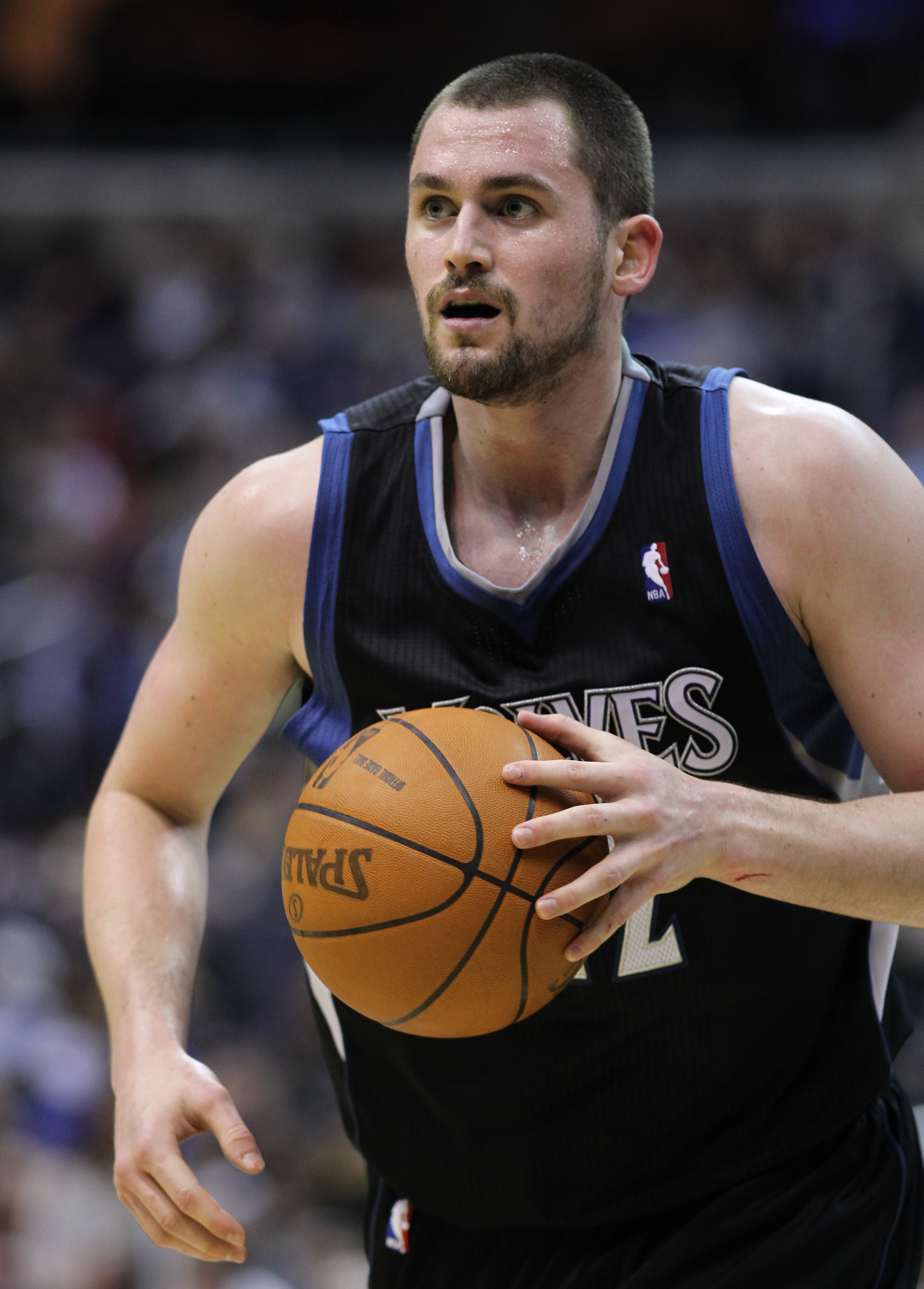
Love in 2011

The Timberwolves' trade of Jefferson before the 2010–11 NBA season was expected to result in more playing time for Love. However, he averaged 28 minutes through the first nine games, exceeding 30 minutes only twice. Chris Mannix of SI.com wrote that many speculated there was a rift between coach Kurt Rambis and Love. In a home game against the New York Knicks on November 12, 2010, Love became the 19th player to record a "30–30" game, when he recorded 31 points along with a career-high 31 rebounds. His 31 rebounds set a Timberwolves franchise record and were also the most by a player in an NBA game since Charles Barkley recorded 33 rebounds in a game in 1996. Love became the first player to record a 30–30 game since Moses Malone in 1982. Love scored a career-high 43 points and had 17 rebounds on December 18 in a 115–113 loss to the Denver Nuggets. On February 4, 2011, Love was selected by Commissioner David Stern to his first NBA All-Star Game as replacement for the injured Yao Ming. The day before, Love was not selected as an All-Star as a reserve although averaging 21.4 points, a league-best 15.5 rebounds, shooting 43.9 percent from 3-point range, and having 34 straight double-doubles for the 11–37 Timberwolves. On February 8, Love set a team record (previously held by Kevin Garnett) with his 38th consecutive double-double after scoring 20 points and recording 14 rebounds in the Timberwolves' 112–108 win over the Houston Rockets. He scored 37 points and had 23 rebounds on February 27 in a 126–123 win over the Golden State Warriors. It was his fourth 30-point, 20-rebound game of the season, and Love went 18 for 23 from the free throw line to tie Minnesota's team records for made and attempted free throws. On March 13, Love's consecutive double-double streak ended at 53 games in a loss to the Golden State Warriors. It was the longest streak since the ABA–NBA merger in 1976, surpassing Malone's 51-game streak from 1979 to 1980. Love was two short of Elvin Hayes's streak of 55 consecutive double-doubles set in the 1973–74 season. According to the Elias Sports Bureau, Wilt Chamberlain holds the record with 227 consecutive double-doubles from 1964 to 1967. The NBA does not recognize the double-double as an official statistic. Love suffered a strained left groin on March 20 against Sacramento. He missed the final six games and nine of the last 11 games of the season due to the injury.

Love led the NBA in rebounding, averaging 15.2 per game. He won the NBA Most Improved Player Award after increasing his points per game by 44 percent and his rebounds per game by 38 percent over his previous season. Love established career highs in rebounding, scoring (20.2), assists (2.5), double-doubles (64), field goal percentage (.470), free throw shooting (.850), and minutes played (35.8). He became the first player to average at least 20 points and 15 rebounds in a season since Malone in the 1982–83 season. While amassing double-doubles, a statistical hallmark of traditional power forwards, Love was also evolving into a stretch four, making a career-high 41.7 percent of his 3's, while upping his three-point attempts to almost three per game. He emerged as the new face of the franchise since Garnett was traded from the Timberwolves to the Boston Celtics in 2007. In 2010–11, Love's No. 42 was the Wolves' top-selling jersey; sales were comparable to Kevin Garnett's when he was in his prime.

==== First All-NBA selection (2011–2012) ====
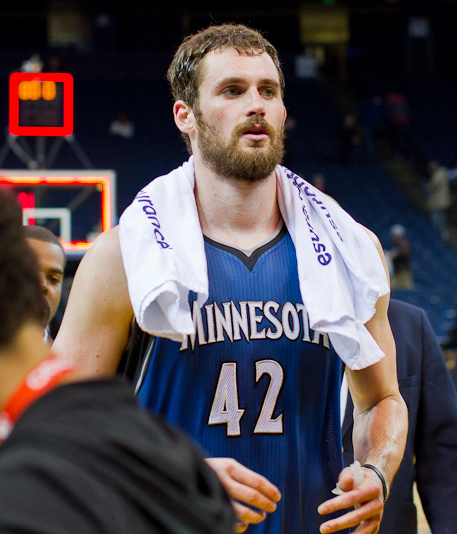
Love in 2012

This was Love's contract season. He had stated that he wanted to be the Timberwolves' "designated player" for a five-year deal during the offseason (a designated player offer must be made prior to the final year qualifying offer), but he was denied this contract by the Timberwolves. Contract negotiations became tense, leading to an incident where David Kahn (team GM) "marched" into the players training room and "thrust [...] a contract offer sheet into his hands". Love responded, "I'm not the one to always follow professional protocol – but I do know what it is, even at 24 years old". They eventually settled on four years with a player option for Love to opt out after the third year. The four-year contract extension worth up to $62 million was finally agreed to, and signed, on January 25, allowing Love to become an unrestricted free agent as early as 2015. Love has stated that he felt very strongly that he should have had a five-year designated player extension, and would have accepted the offer, had it been offered to him.

Love followed up this new contract extension the subsequent night with a 31-point performance in a win over the Dallas Mavericks. In January 2012, Love scored 30 points in three consecutive games for the first time in his career. He began the season recording 15 straight double-doubles, the first player to do so since Hakeem Olajuwon in the beginning of the 1992–93 NBA season. On January 20, Love made a three-point buzzer beater to defeat the Los Angeles Clippers.

On February 6, Love was given a two-game suspension for stepping on the face of Houston's Luis Scola. After the February 4 game, Love had said, "I mean, he fell down after the play. He just kind of laid there and... I just happened to be there. I had nowhere to go. I got kind of tripped up and I just had nowhere to step. He was right there... and it happened to be his face." On February 25, Love participated in the Three-Point Contest and defeated Kevin Durant in the final tie-breaking round to win the contest. Love scored a season high 42 points in a win over the Portland Trail Blazers on March 3. Love set a franchise record for most games scoring over 30 points in a season on March 12 in a victory over the Phoenix Suns. He also had a career-high 51 points in a 149–140 double overtime loss to the Oklahoma City Thunder. The following game, Love erupted for 30 points and grabbed 21 rebounds in a win over the Denver Nuggets. For the season, Love was named to the All-NBA second team and finished sixth in MVP voting. In the offseason, Love voiced frustration with Minnesota for not being a playoff team. The Timberwolves finished with the Western Conference's fourth-worst record at 26–40, which was still the franchise's most wins since the 2006–07 season.

==== Injury (2012–2013) ====
On October 17, 2012, it was reported that Love would miss six to eight weeks after breaking the third and fourth metacarpals on his right (shooting) hand during a morning workout. Love surprised fans by returning to the Wolves on November 21, just five weeks after sustaining the injury. He played 35 minutes and scored 34 points while grabbing 14 rebounds against the Denver Nuggets. In December, Love would score 36 points against the Cleveland Cavaliers, yet he continued to voice his frustration with the team's front office.

On January 3, 2013, Love refractured his shooting hand in a game against the Denver Nuggets. It was announced by the Timberwolves that Love's injury would require surgery and he was expected to miss an additional eight to ten weeks of playing time. Prior to the second fracture, Love was shooting just 21.7 percent on three-pointers and a career-low 35 percent from the field, leading some to speculate that he had returned too quickly from his original injury. Love himself admitted that the hand remained an issue throughout the season, saying "It's just the hand being so idle, having to strengthen it. Getting the ball to feel right in my hand has been such a struggle since getting back on the court a couple weeks ago."

==== Final year in Minnesota (2013–2014) ====
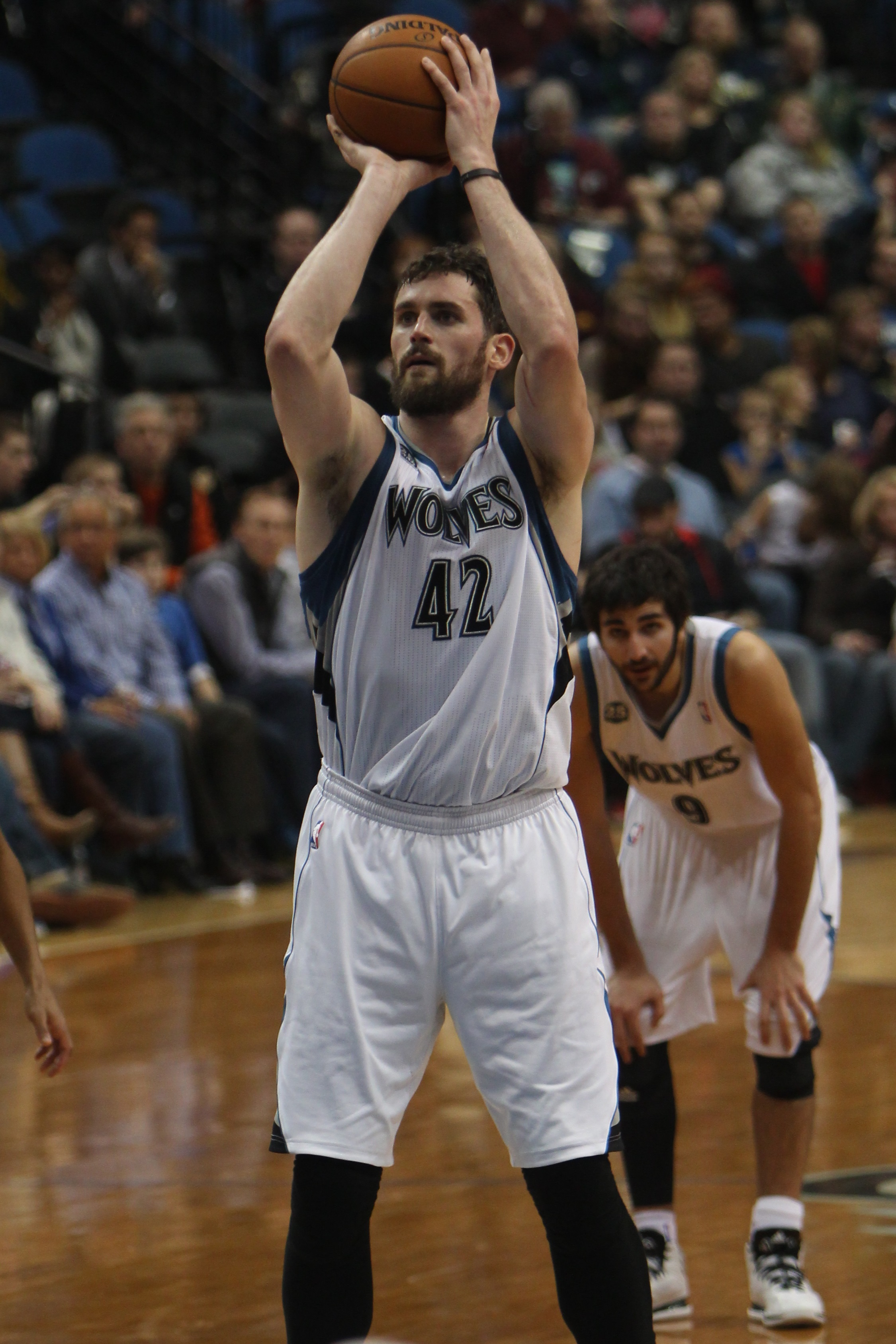
Love shooting a free throw in 2014

On February 22, 2014, Love recorded his first career triple double with 37 points, 12 rebounds, and a career-high 10 assists in a 121–104 win over the Utah Jazz. On March 9, Love, with a 3-pointer midway through the third quarter of Minnesota's 104–111 loss to the Raptors, broke the Timberwolves' franchise record for 3-pointers in a season. With that make (143), he passed Rashad McCants' record of 142 in the 2007–08 season. On March 28, he recorded his second career triple double with 22 points, 10 rebounds and 10 assists in a 143–107 win over the Los Angeles Lakers. On April 2, 2014, Love recorded his third career triple double with 24 points, 16 rebounds and 10 assists in a 102–88 win over the Memphis Grizzlies. Love set an NBA record in 2013–14, becoming the first player in NBA history to record 2,000 points, 900 rebounds and 100 3-pointers in a single season. He was named to the All-NBA Second Team for the second time in his career.

=== Cleveland Cavaliers (2014–2023) ===
==== Big Three formation and first playoff (2014–2015) ====
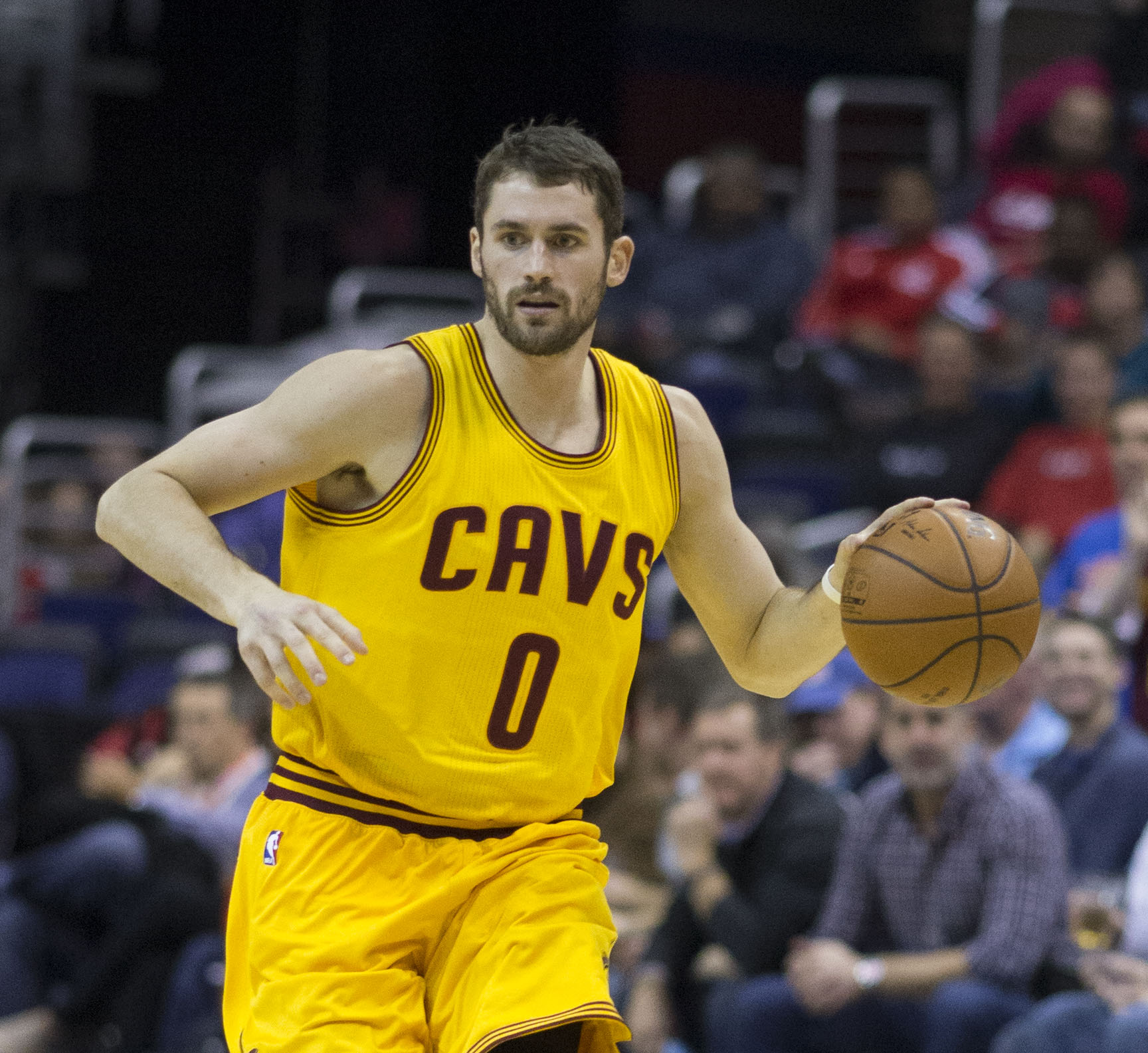
Love with the Cavaliers in 2014

On August 23, 2014, the Timberwolves traded Love to the Cleveland Cavaliers in a three-team trade. The Timberwolves received Andrew Wiggins and Anthony Bennett from Cleveland, and Thaddeus Young from the Philadelphia 76ers, while the Philadelphia 76ers received Luc Mbah a Moute and Alexey Shved from Minnesota and a 2015 first-round draft pick from Cleveland. On February 8, 2015, Love scored a season-high 32 points on 11-of-18 shooting in a 120–105 win over the Los Angeles Lakers. On February 24, he scored 24 points on eight three-pointers, tying his career best, as he helped the Cavaliers defeat the Detroit Pistons, 102–93.

Love helped the Cavaliers win 34 of their final 43 games to finish the regular season as the No. 2 seed in the Eastern Conference with a 53–29 overall record. In his first career playoff game on April 19, Love recorded 19 points and 12 rebounds in a 113–100 win over the Boston Celtics in Game 1 of their first-round playoff match-up. Cleveland swept the series 4–0, but Love missed the remainder of the playoffs after he dislocated his left shoulder in the first quarter of Game 4 when he got tangled with the Celtics' Kelly Olynyk while battling for a loose ball. Love called it a "bush-league play", while Olynyk said he would "never intentionally hurt someone." The league ruled that Olynyk had "yanked Love's arm down", and suspended Olynyk for one game. Love underwent surgery to repair his shoulder and the team said he would need four to six months to recover. Without Love, the Cavaliers reached the 2015 NBA Finals but were defeated by the Golden State Warriors in six games. On June 24, 2015, Love opted out of the final year of his contract, worth $16.7 million in 2015–16, to return to free agency.

==== NBA championship (2015–2016) ====
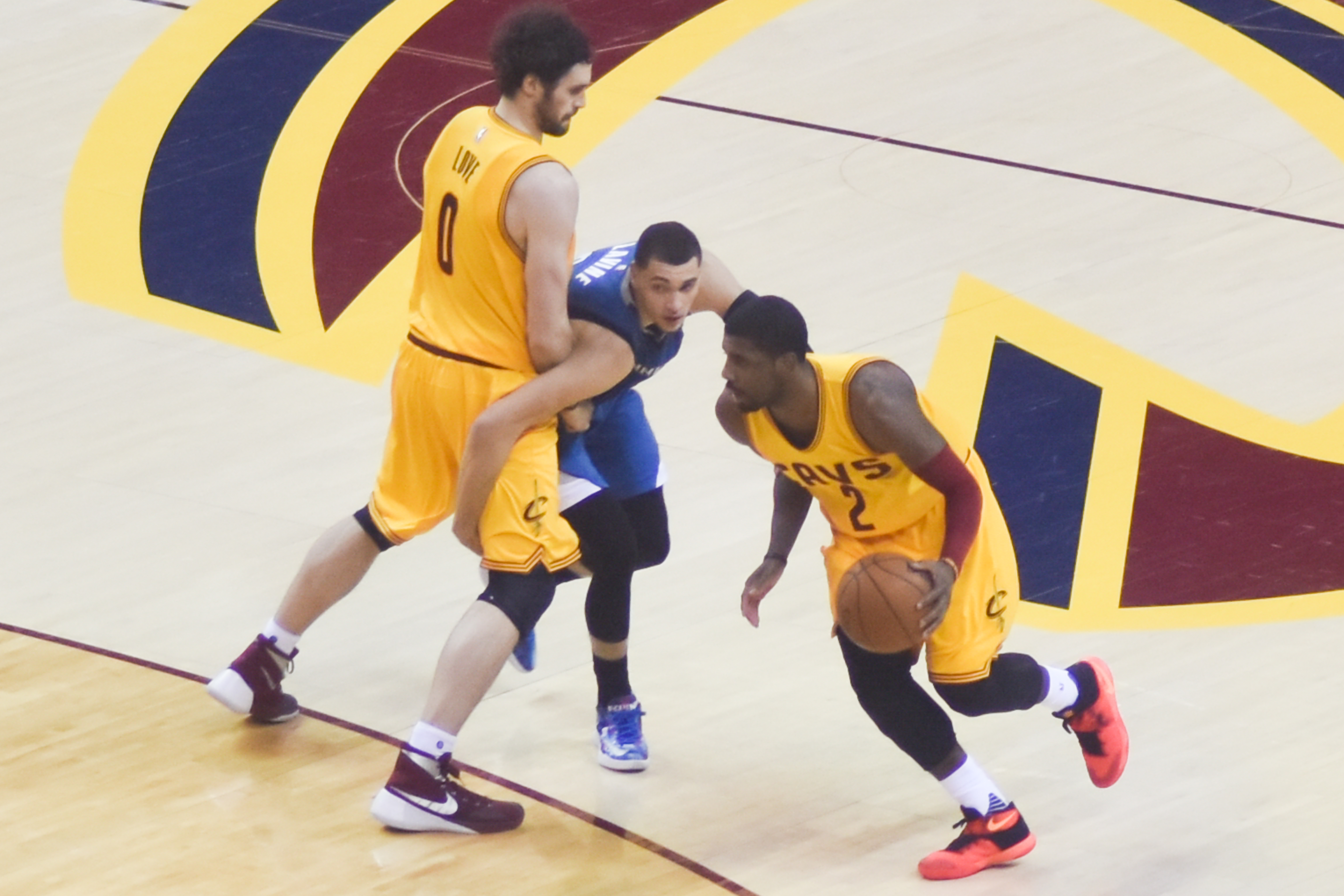
Love screening for Kyrie Irving in 2016

On July 9, 2015, Love re-signed with the Cavaliers on a five-year, $110 million contract. On November 23, 2015, he scored 27 of his season-high 34 points in the first half of the Cavaliers' 117–103 win over the Orlando Magic. On January 29, 2016, he had his best game since November 23, scoring 29 points on 9-of-19 shooting in a 114–106 win over the Detroit Pistons. That game also marked the first time all season that Love, LeBron James and Kyrie Irving each reached 20 points in a game.

The Cavaliers finished the regular season as the first seed in the Eastern Conference with a 57–25 record. In the first round of the playoffs, the Cavaliers faced the eighth-seeded Detroit Pistons, and in a Game 1 win on April 17, Love recorded playoff career highs with 28 points and 13 rebounds. Love helped the Cavaliers advance through to the Eastern Conference Finals where they faced the Toronto Raptors. He struggled in Games 3 and 4 of the series, scoring just 15 total points, before bouncing back in Games 5 and 6 to help the Cavaliers defeat the Raptors 4–2. The win advanced them through to the NBA Finals, where they faced the defending champion Golden State Warriors. Love's struggles in the NBA Finals were well documented. After recording 17 points and 13 rebounds in a Game 1 loss, a concussion suffered in Game 2 forced him to miss Game 3. His return in Game 4 saw him come off the bench to score 11 points, but with a 108–97 loss, the Cavaliers fell behind 3–1 in the series. Game 5 saw Love return to the starting line-up, but despite playing 33 minutes, he managed just two points as the Cavaliers forced a Game 6 with a 112–97 win. Game 6 also saw Love struggle, but the Cavaliers managed a 115–101 win to force a Game 7. The Cavaliers won Games 5 and 6 with Love contributing just nine total points on 2-of-8 shooting. With the series tied a 3–3, Love managed 9 points and 14 rebounds in Game 7 to help the Cavaliers win the series 4–3, as they became the first team to rally from a 3–1 finals deficit, beating the Warriors 93–89 in Game 7 to end a 52-year major sports championship drought in Cleveland. Many credited Love's defense on league MVP Stephen Curry in the final minutes of Game 7 as a main contributor to Cleveland sealing the win late in the championship clinching victory.

==== Coming up short (2016–2018) ====
On October 25, 2016, after receiving his first championship ring before the season opener, Love recorded 23 points and 12 rebounds in a 117–88 win over the New York Knicks. On November 3, he scored a then season-high 26 points in a 128–122 win over the Boston Celtics, helping the Cavaliers go 5–0 for the first time since 1976–77 when they started 8–0. On November 23, he scored 40 points, including an NBA-record 34 in the first quarter, to help the Cavaliers defeat the Portland Trail Blazers 137–125. His 34 first-quarter points were the second most all-time in a quarter; Klay Thompson of the Golden State Warriors set the record at 37 in the third quarter on January 23, 2015. Five days later, he was named Eastern Conference Player of the Week for games played Monday, November 21 through Sunday, November 27. Love led the Cavaliers to a 3–0 week behind an East-leading 30.7 points per game. On December 25, he scored 20 points in a 109–108 win over the Warriors, recording his 10,000th career point in the process.

On January 26, 2017, Love was named an Eastern Conference All-Star reserve for the 2017 NBA All-Star Game. However, on February 14, 2017, he underwent arthroscopic surgery to remove a loose body from his left knee, and was subsequently ruled out for approximately six weeks, thus missing the All-Star Game. On March 16, he played his first game for the Cavaliers since February 11 and had 10 points and nine rebounds in 19 minutes in a 91–83 win over the Utah Jazz.

In Game 1 of the Eastern Conference Finals against the Boston Celtics on May 17, Love scored a playoff career-high 32 points and had 12 rebounds to help the Cavaliers improve to 9–0 in the first three rounds of the playoffs, defeating the Celtics 117–104. With 15 points in Game 5 of the series, Love helped the Cavaliers defeat the Celtics 135–102 to claim their third straight Eastern Conference title and a return trip to the NBA Finals. After going down 3–0 in the 2017 NBA Finals, Love made six 3-pointers and had 23 points in Game 4 to help Cleveland extend the series and avoid a sweep with a 137–116 win over the Warriors. The Cavaliers went on to lose to the Warriors in Game 5, thus losing the series 4–1.

In the Cavaliers' season opener on October 17, 2017, Love scored 15 points in a 102–99 win over the Boston Celtics. He hit a critical 3-pointer with 46.3 seconds left to put Cleveland up 102–98. On November 7, 2017, he had a then season-best game with 32 points and 16 rebounds in a 124–119 win over the Milwaukee Bucks. On November 28, 2017, he scored 32 of his 38 points in the first half of the Cavaliers' 108–97 win over the Miami Heat. He scored 22 points in the first quarter and finished 10 of 16 from the field and 14 of 17 on free throws. On December 25, 2017, he had a game-high 31 points and a season-best 18 rebounds in a 99–92 loss to the Golden State Warriors. On January 30, 2018, Love left the Cavaliers' game against the Detroit Pistons with a fracture in his left hand. He missed six weeks and 21 games with the injury, returning to action on March 19 against the Bucks. He scored 18 points in 25 minutes in a 124–117 win. Two days later, he recorded 23 points and 12 rebounds in a 132–129 win over the Toronto Raptors. He knocked down his 1,000th career 3-pointer during the game. On April 1, 2018, he recorded his 400th career double-double with 13 points and 13 rebounds in a 98–87 win over the Dallas Mavericks. In Game 2 of the Cavaliers' second-round playoff series against the Raptors, Love had his best game of the postseason with 31 points and 11 rebounds in a 128–110 win, helping Cleveland take a 2–0 lead in the series. Love missed matching his career playoff high by one point. In Game 4 against Toronto, Love scored 23 points in a 128–93 series-clinching win. During the game, Love became the fourth player in Cleveland history with 500 career playoff rebounds, joining LeBron James, Tristan Thompson and Zydrunas Ilgauskas. In Game 1 of the NBA Finals, Love recorded 21 points and 13 rebounds in a 124–114 overtime loss to the Warriors. The Cavaliers went on to lose the series in four games.

==== Injury-plagued years (2018–2021) ====
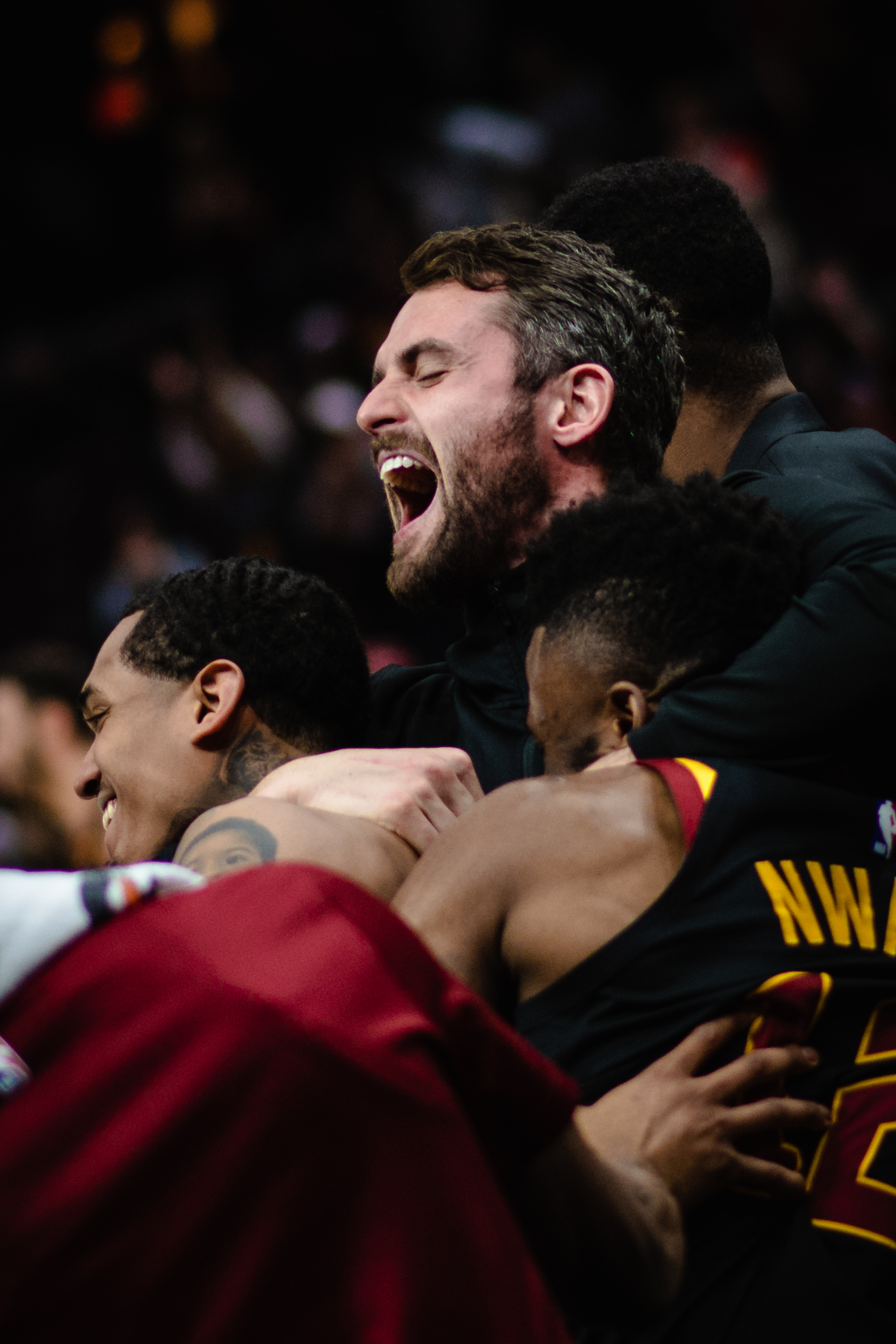
Love in 2019

In the aftermath of LeBron James' departure in free agency to the Los Angeles Lakers, the Cavaliers aggressively pushed to secure Love for the long term. On July 24, 2018, Love signed a four-year, $120 million extension with the Cavaliers. He appeared in the first four games of the regular season before being sidelined with an injured left foot. On November 2, Love had surgery to rectify a painful big toe injury on his left foot. The injury had bothered him since the preseason opener and affected his ability to walk. He was initially ruled out for six weeks, but that was later pushed back to the new year. Love returned to action on February 8, 2019, after missing 50 games. He started and played the first six minutes against the Washington Wizards, scoring four points, before not returning to the game. On February 23, he scored a season-high 32 points in a 112–107 win over the Memphis Grizzlies. For the season, Love attempted 6.7 three-point shots per game, accounting for 52% of his field-goal attempts.

In 2019–20, Love clashed with new Cleveland head coach John Beilein, who was replaced mid-season by J. B. Bickerstaff. Love had five 30-point games during the season, finishing with averages of 17.6 points on 45% shooting and 37.4% from 3-point range while adding 9.8 rebounds and 3.2 assists.

In the first preseason game of 2020–21, Love suffered a calf injury, which caused him to miss the regular season opener. He returned in the second game, but he reaggravated the injury in the third game and was expected to be sidelined 3–4 weeks. On May 12, 2021, Love logged his fifth double-double of the season with a season-high 30 points and 14 rebounds in a 102–94 win over the Boston Celtics, ending the Cavaliers' 11-game losing streak.

==== Sixth Man of the Year runner-up and buyout (2021–2023) ====
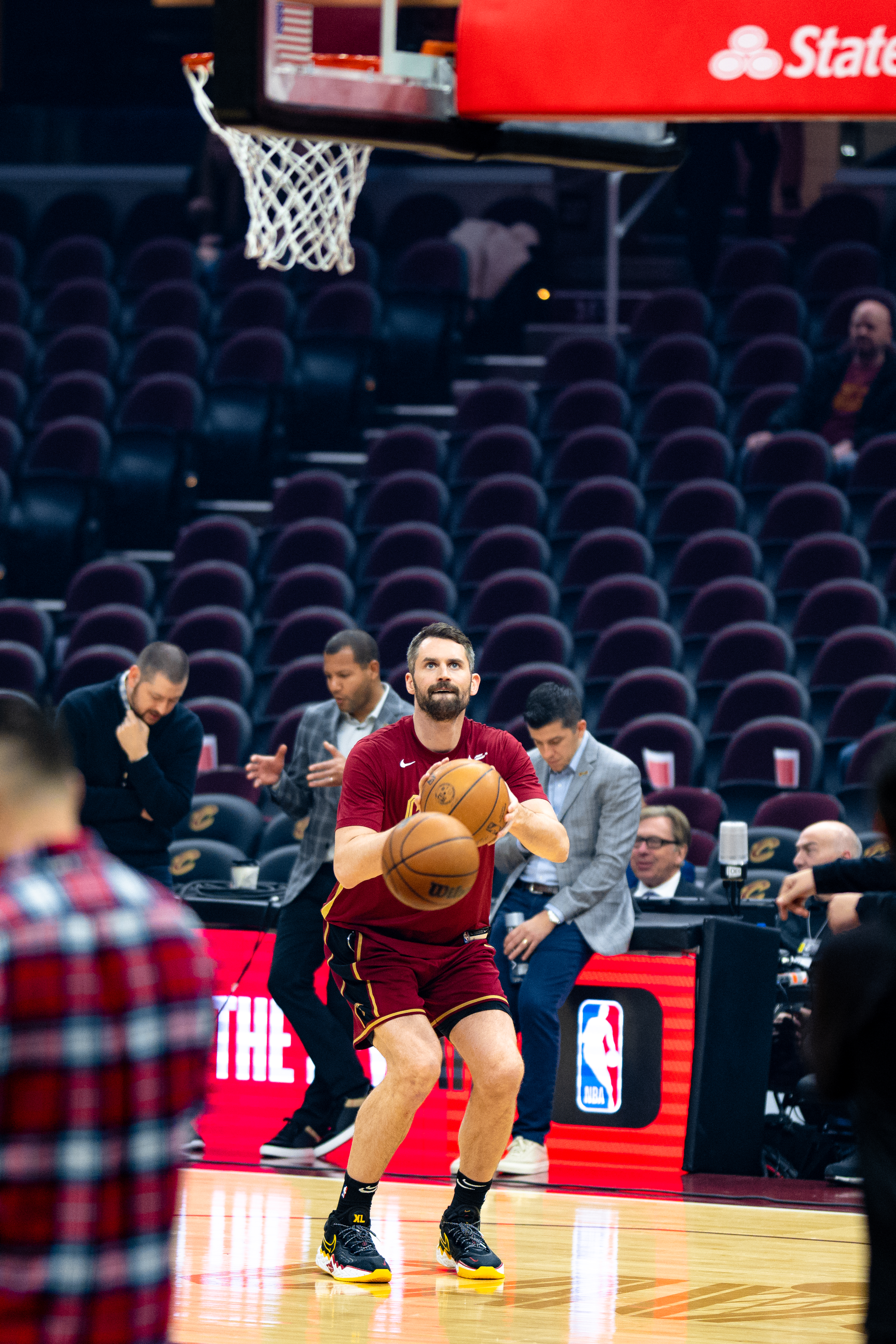
Love in 2022

In 2021–22, Love became a reserve for the first time since early in his career. Against the Atlanta Hawks on December 31, 2021, he had 35 points on 10-for-18 shooting, including a 7-for-14 on 3-pointers, for his highest-scoring game in over four seasons. He was the runner-up for the NBA Sixth Man of the Year Award after averaging 13.6 points, 7.2 rebounds and 2.2 assists.

On February 18, 2023, Love and the Cavaliers officially agreed to a contract buyout, making him a free agent. He averaged 8.5 points, 6.8 rebounds, and 1.9 assists before the buyout with the team.

After signing with the Miami Heat after the game, Love was the last player from the 2015–16 championship team still on the roster. However, Tristan Thompson, a member of said team, returned to the Cavaliers months later, but re-signed in September 2024.

=== Miami Heat (2023–2025) ===
On February 20, 2023, Love signed with the Miami Heat. On February 24, Love made his Heat debut going scoreless and putting up eight rebounds in a 128–99 loss to the Milwaukee Bucks. With the Heat, Love reached his fifth NBA Finals in just his fifth playoff run. However, the Heat went on to lose the Finals in 5 games to the Denver Nuggets.

On July 6, 2023, Love re-signed with the Heat on a two-year, $7.9 million contract, with a player option for the second year. He made 55 appearances (five starts) for Miami during the 2023–24 NBA season, averaging 8.8 points, 6.1 rebounds, and 2.1 assists. On June 30, 2024, Love declined his player option and a week later, he again re-signed with Miami on a two-year, $8 million contract.

=== Utah Jazz (2025–2026) ===
On July 7, 2025, Love was traded to the Utah Jazz in a three-team transaction. Utah also acquired Kyle Anderson from the Miami Heat, and a 2nd-round pick from the Los Angeles Clippers. Norman Powell was traded from Los Angeles to Miami, and John Collins was traded from Utah to Los Angeles. Love appeared in 37 games for Utah in 2025–26, making five starts while averaging 6.7 points, 5.8 rebounds and 1.8 assists across 16.6 minutes per game.

Love went unsigned in the 2026 off-season.

== National team career ==
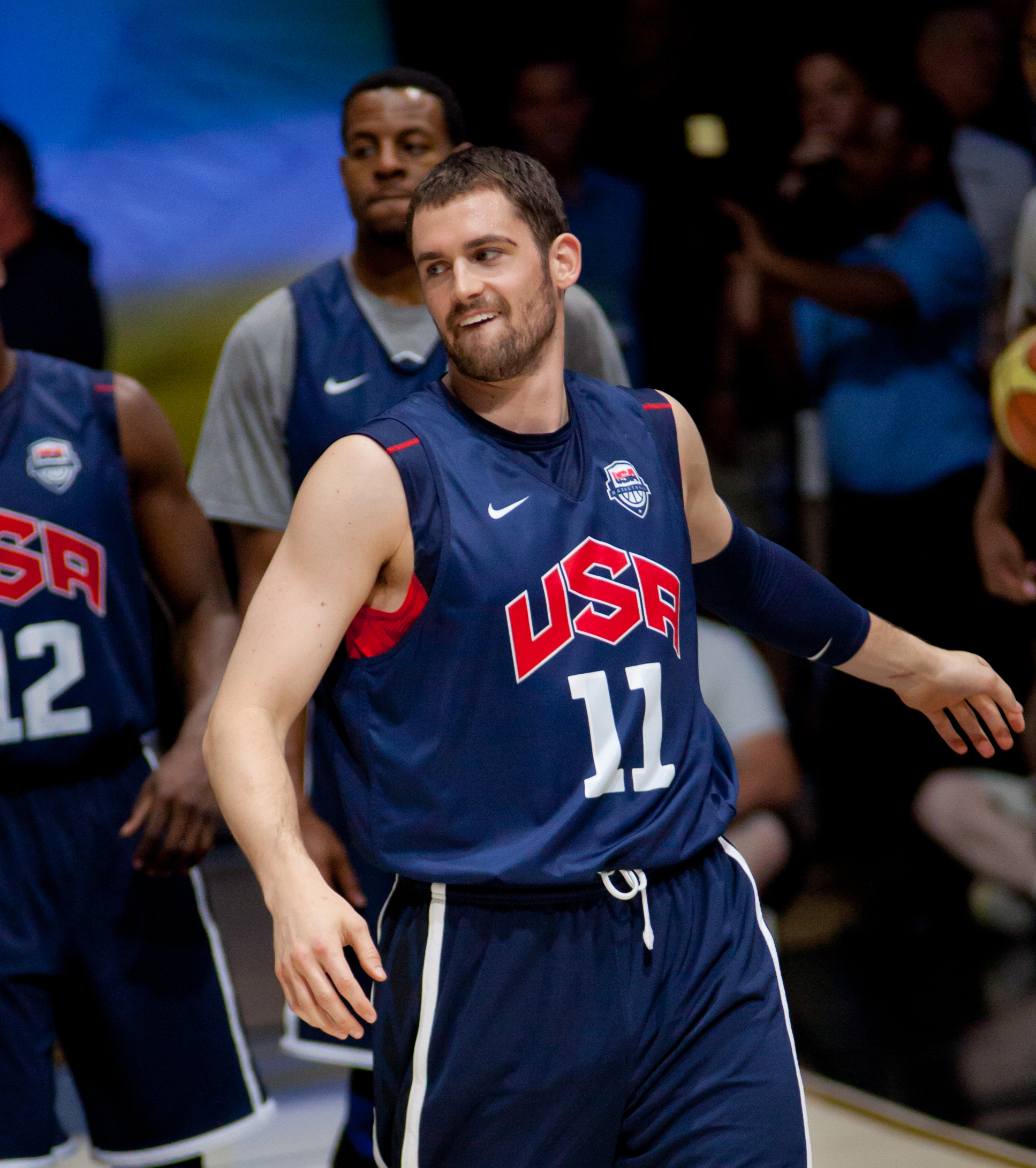
Love with the U.S. national team in 2012

Love was a member of the United States national team that won the gold medal at the 2010 FIBA World Championship. Love made the 2012 Olympic team on July 7, 2012. The team finished undefeated, winning the gold medal over runners-up Spain.

Mired in unresolved trade talks between Minnesota and other NBA teams, Love withdrew himself from the 2014 FIBA Basketball World Cup (formerly World Championship) team. He was also selected for the 2020 Olympic team in Tokyo, but withdrew after the third exhibition game, stating that he was not fully recovered from the right calf injury that sidelined him for much of the 2020–21 season.

== Career statistics ==
Legend
GP	Games played	GS	Games started	MPG	Minutes per game
FG%	Field goal percentage	3P%	3-point field goal percentage	FT%	Free throw percentage
RPG	Rebounds per game	APG	Assists per game	SPG	Steals per game
BPG	Blocks per game	PPG	Points per game	**Bold**	Career high
†	Won an NBA championship	*	Led the league

=== NBA ===
==== Regular season ====
Year	Team	GP	GS	MPG	FG%	3P%	FT%	RPG	APG	SPG	BPG	PPG
2008–09	Minnesota	**81**	37	25.3	.459	.105	.789	9.1	1.0	.4	**.6**	11.1
2009–10	Minnesota	60	22	28.6	.450	.330	.815	11.0	2.3	.7	.4	14.0
2010–11	Minnesota	73	73	35.8	**.470**	**.417**	.850	**15.2***	2.5	.6	.4	20.2
2011–12	Minnesota	55	55	**39.0**	.448	.372	.824	13.3	2.0	**.9**	.5	26.0
2012–13	Minnesota	18	18	34.3	.352	.217	.704	14.0	2.3	.7	.5	18.3
2013–14	Minnesota	77	**77**	36.3	.457	.376	.821	12.5	**4.4**	.8	.5	**26.1**
2014–15	Cleveland	75	75	33.8	.434	.367	.804	9.7	2.2	.7	.5	16.4
2015–16†	Cleveland	77	**77**	31.5	.419	.360	.822	9.9	2.4	.8	.5	16.0
2016–17	Cleveland	60	60	31.4	.427	.373	.871	11.1	1.9	**.9**	.4	19.0
2017–18	Cleveland	59	59	28.0	.458	.415	.880	9.3	1.7	.7	.4	17.6
2018–19	Cleveland	22	21	27.2	.385	.361	**.904**	10.9	2.2	.3	.2	17.0
2019–20	Cleveland	56	56	31.8	.450	.374	.854	9.8	3.2	.6	.3	17.6
2020–21	Cleveland	25	25	24.9	.409	.365	.824	7.4	2.5	.6	.1	12.2
2021–22	Cleveland	74	4	22.5	.430	.392	.838	7.2	2.2	.4	.2	13.6
2022–23	Cleveland	41	3	20.0	.389	.354	.889	6.8	1.9	.2	.2	8.5
2022–23	Miami	21	17	19.9	.388	.297	.857	5.7	1.9	.4	.2	7.7
2023–24	Miami	55	5	16.8	.440	.344	.787	6.1	2.1	.3	.2	8.8
2024–25	Miami	23	9	10.9	.357	.358	.696	4.1	1.0	.7	.2	5.3
2025–26	Utah	37	5	16.6	.397	.373	.841	5.8	1.8	.4	.2	6.7
Career		989	698	28.4	.437	.369	.828	9.8	2.3	.6	.4	15.8
All-Star		3	1	21.0	.500	.364	.286	6.7	1.3	1.3	.0	10.7

==== Playoffs ====
Year	Team	GP	GS	MPG	FG%	3P%	FT%	RPG	APG	SPG	BPG	PPG
2015	Cleveland	4	4	26.7	.415	.429	.737	7.0	**2.5**	.3	.5	14.3
2016†	Cleveland	20	19	30.6	.385	.414	.840	8.8	2.1	.5	.4	14.7
2017	Cleveland	18	18	**32.1**	.436	**.450**	.840	**10.6**	1.7	**1.2**	**.9**	**16.8**
2018	Cleveland	**21**	**21**	31.4	.392	.340	**.922**	10.2	1.6	.7	.4	14.9
2023	Miami	20	18	17.9	.378	.375	.875	5.6	1.2	.5	.4	6.9
2024	Miami	5	0	6.4	**.444**	.250	—	2.8	.8	.0	.0	1.8
Career		88	80	26.7	.400	.397	.855	8.3	1.6	.7	.5	12.6

=== College ===
Year	Team	GP	GS	MPG	FG%	3P%	FT%	RPG	APG	SPG	BPG	PPG
2007–08	UCLA	39	38	29.6	.559	.354	.767	10.6	1.9	.7	1.4	17.5

== Personal life ==
Love's uncle, Mike, is a founding member of the Beach Boys and brother of Love's father, Stan. Mike and Stan's cousins include the brothers Brian Wilson, Carl Wilson, and Dennis Wilson, who were also founding members of the Beach Boys. Love's aunt, Kathleen McCartney, was an accomplished triathlete. He has an older brother, Collin, and a younger sister, Emily. His middle name, Wesley, is in honor of Wes Unseld, the former Washington Bullets center and the Loves' family friend.

Love had been dating Canadian model Kate Bock for "nearly five years" before getting engaged on January 31, 2021. They married on June 25, 2022, at the New York Public Library in New York City. In June 2023, Bock gave birth to the couple's first child, during the 2023 NBA Finals.

In March 2018, in response to DeMar DeRozan's public discussion of his struggles with depression, Love revealed that he had been seeing a therapist for several months following a panic attack during a game in November 2017. In a first-person article in The Players' Tribune in March 2018 entitled, "Everyone Is Going Through Something", Love wrote: "Mental health is an invisible thing, but it touches all of us at some point or another." It continued: "I want to remind you that you're not weird or different for sharing what you're going through."

In August 2018, Love continued his advocacy for mental health awareness, discussing his family's history of depression, along with his own struggles with anxiety, rage, and "dark times" where he would hide in his room and not talk to anyone. Love committed to forming a foundation focusing on mental health, particularly for young boys, adding that he believes he's "found [his] life's work."

In 2023, Love announced his plan to return to Cleveland before retiring stating he is "definitely open to coming back and retiring" with the Cavaliers.

=== Philanthropy ===
In 2009, Love became the first among NBA players to join the Hoops for St. Jude charity program benefitting the St. Jude Children's Research Hospital, after working with the hospital as part of the league's "Rookie Relief" community outreach program in his first season in the league.

In 2018, he established the Kevin Love Fund to provide tools and help for people to improve their physical and emotional well-being, with the goal of assisting more than 1 billion people over the next five years. Early beneficiaries included two programs to empower high school students to make healthy choices and the UCLA Athletics Department. On March 12, 2020, Love's fund gave $100,000 to the support staff of Rocket Mortgage FieldHouse, where the Cleveland Cavaliers play, who were unable to work during the 2020 coronavirus pandemic. He was joined by Cavaliers center Andre Drummond, who donated an additional $60,000.

On April 26, 2020, The Kevin Love Fund sent a truckload of lunches to the staff of the Cleveland Clinic's Medical Intensive Care Unit and its COVID-19 testing sites, and appeared by FaceTime to personally thank the healthcare workers there. On June 22, 2020, he announced that his fund was pledging $500,000, matched by the UCLA Centennial Term Chair Match, to establish the Kevin Love Fund Chair in UCLA's psychology department. The $1 million investment will support a scholar at one of the top-ranked psychology departments in the United States whose work helps diagnose, prevent, treat and destigmatize anxiety and depression.

Separately, Love donated to UCLA Athletics what was reported by the Orange County Register to be $1 million in September 2016, matching a gift by fellow NBA star and UCLA alumnus Russell Westbrook. These and other gifts funded the construction of the Mo Ostin Basketball Center on UCLA's Westwood campus.

== Endorsements and investments ==
In 2011, Love signed a 6-year endorsement contract with the Chinese shoe company 361 Degrees.

In 2012, Love became an investor in the lifestyle website 12Society.

In 2016, Love became the new style ambassador and campaign model for Banana Republic.

== Media appearances ==
On a video game, Love appeared on the front cover of NCAA Basketball 09 in 2009.

On television, he appeared as himself on the Disney Channel show The Suite Life on Deck during the season 3 episode "Twister: Part 1" along with Dwight Howard and Deron Williams. He appeared in the HBO television series Entourage in its seventh-season finale "Lose Yourself".

On film, he was one of the stars in the feature length, 2008 documentary Gunnin' for That No. 1 Spot. And he was also in the short 2012 documentary My Life As An NBA Rookie.

Online, he was part of an internet advertising campaign in 2012 by PepsiCo for Pepsi Max that featured the character "Uncle Drew" played by Love's future NBA teammate Kyrie Irving. It was wildly popular, and reported to be the second most watched ad on YouTube that year and among the 50 most-viewed viral videos worldwide, garnering more than 22 million views. PepsiCo and its advertising agency Davie Brown Entertainment quickly rolled out another commercial later that year, "Uncle Drew: Chapter 2", this time co-starring Kevin Love. These and two more commercials led to the theatrical movie Uncle Drew in 2018 (Love was not part of that production).

== Awards and honors ==
=== NBA ===
- NBA Champion: 2016
- 5× NBA All-Star: 2011, 2012, 2014, 2017, 2018
- 2× All-NBA Second Team: 2012, 2014
- NBA free throw scoring leader: 2012
- NBA rebounding leader: 2011

=== USA Basketball ===
- FIBA World Championship gold medalist: 2010
- Olympic gold medalist: 2012

=== NCAA ===
- First Team All-American: 2008
- Pac-10 Player of the Year: 2008
- UCLA Hall of Fame (class of 2020)

=== High School ===
- 2006 Oregon State Championship (with Lake Oswego)
- 2007 Naismith Prep Player of the Year Award

=== ESPY Awards ===
- 2016 Best Team (as a member of the Cleveland Cavaliers)
- 2020 Arthur Ashe Courage Award

=== Local ===
- 2021 Greater Cleveland Sports Awards - Humanitarian of the Year

== See also ==
- List of NBA career rebounding leaders
- List of NBA career 3-point scoring leaders
- List of NBA annual rebounding leaders
- List of NBA single-game rebounding leaders
- List of second-generation National Basketball Association players
- 2006 high school boys basketball All-Americans
