= 2013–14 Minnesota Timberwolves season =

NBA professional basketball team season

- Head coach: Rick Adelman
- General manager: Flip Saunders
- Owner: Glen Taylor
- Arena: Target Center

Results
- Record: 40–42 (.488)
- Place: Division: 3rd (Northwest); Conference: 10th (Western)
- Playoff finish: Did not qualify
- Stats at Basketball Reference

Local media
- Television: Fox Sports North
- Radio: WCCO

The 2013–14 Minnesota Timberwolves season is the 25th season for the franchise in the National Basketball Association (NBA). 2011 #2 overall pick Derrick Williams was traded to Sacramento after just under two and a half seasons with the team, with management citing fit concerns as his minutes fluctuated.

== Key dates ==
- June 27: The 2013 NBA draft took place at Barclays Center in Brooklyn, New York.
- July 1: 2013 NBA free agency began.

== Draft picks ==
Round	Pick	Player	Position	Nationality	College
1	9	Trey Burke	PG	United States	Michigan
1	26	André Roberson	SG/SF	United States	Colorado
2	52	Lorenzo Brown	PG	United States	NC State
2	59	Bojan Dubljević	PF	Montenegro	Valencia Basket (Spain)

On draft night, Minnesota traded the rights to Trey Burke to the Utah Jazz for players they would later select at #14 and #21 overall, UCLA swingman Shabazz Muhammad and Louisville center Gorgui Dieng.

== Roster ==
2013–14 Minnesota Timberwolves roster
Players

Pos.	No.	Player	Height	Weight	DOB	From
G	11	José Juan Barea	6 ft 0 in (1.83 m)	178 lb (81 kg)	1984–06–26	Northeastern
G/F	13	Corey Brewer	6 ft 9 in (2.06 m)	185 lb (84 kg)	1986–03–05	Florida
F	10	Chase Budinger	6 ft 7 in (2.01 m)	209 lb (95 kg)	1988–05–22	Arizona
F	33	Dante Cunningham	6 ft 8 in (2.03 m)	221 lb (100 kg)	1987–04–22	Villanova
C	5	Gorgui Dieng	6 ft 11 in (2.11 m)	238 lb (108 kg)	1990–01–18	Louisville
G/F	6	Robbie Hummel	6 ft 8 in (2.03 m)	220 lb (100 kg)	1989–03–08	Purdue
G/F	0	Othyus Jeffers	6 ft 5 in (1.96 m)	200 lb (91 kg)	1985–08–15	Robert Morris (IL)
F/C	42	Kevin Love	6 ft 10 in (2.08 m)	243 lb (110 kg)	1988–09–07	UCLA
G	23	Kevin Martin	6 ft 7 in (2.01 m)	197 lb (89 kg)	1983–02–01	Western Carolina
F	12	Luc Mbah a Moute	6 ft 8 in (2.03 m)	230 lb (104 kg)	1986–09–09	UCLA
G/F	15	Shabazz Muhammad	6 ft 6 in (1.98 m)	222 lb (101 kg)	1992–11–13	UCLA
C	14	Nikola Peković	6 ft 11 in (2.11 m)	285 lb (129 kg)	1986–01–03	Montenegro
G	9	Ricky Rubio	6 ft 4 in (1.93 m)	185 lb (84 kg)	1990–10–21	Spain
G	1	Alexey Shved	6 ft 6 in (1.98 m)	187 lb (85 kg)	1988–12–16	Russia
C	32	Ronny Turiaf	6 ft 10 in (2.08 m)	241 lb (109 kg)	1983–01–13	Gonzaga

Coaches
Head coach
- Rick Adelman
Assistant(s)
- Terry Porter
- Jack Sikma
- T. R. Dunn
- David Adelman

Legend
- (DP) Unsigned draft pick
- (FA) Free agent
- (S) Suspended
- (DL) On assignment to D-League affiliate
- Injured

Roster
Updated: 2014–04–08

== Pre-season ==
2013 pre-season game log
Total: 4–3 (Home: 2–2; Road: 2–1)
Pre-season: 5–3 (home: 2–2; road: 3–1)

Game	Date	Team	Score	High points	High rebounds	High assists	Location Attendance	Record
1	October 7	CSKA Moscow	L 106–108 (OT)	Derrick Williams (21)	Derrick Williams (9)	Kevin Love (5)	Target Center; 9,111	0–1
2	October 9	@ Toronto	W 101–89	Kevin Love (20)	Kevin Love (9)	Ricky Rubio (7)	Air Canada Centre; 17,261	1–1
3	October 10	Milwaukee	W 98–89	Othyus Jeffers (13)	Gorgui Dieng (9)	José Juan Barea (4)	The Pentagon; 3,250	2–1
4	October 12	Toronto	L 97–104	Kevin Love (28)	Kevin Love (11)	Ricky Rubio (6)	Target Center; 10,106	2–2
5	October 20	Boston	W 104–89	Kevin Love (22)	Kevin Love (9)	Ricky Rubio (7)	Bell Centre; 20,152	3–2
6	October 23	@ Philadelphia	W 125–102	José Juan Barea (22)	Ronny Turiaf (12)	Rubio & Price (5)	Wells Fargo Center; 7,938	4–2
7	October 24	@ Detroit	L 98–99	Kevin Love (19)	Kevin Love (10)	Kevin Martin (4)	Palace of Auburn Hills; 10,107	4–3

2013–14 season schedule

== Regular season ==
=== Season standings ===
Northwest Division	W	L	PCT	GB	Home	Road	Div	GP
y-Oklahoma City Thunder	59	23	.720	–	34‍–‍7	25‍–‍16	11–5	82
x-Portland Trail Blazers	54	28	.659	5.0	31‍–‍10	23‍–‍18	13–3	82
Minnesota Timberwolves	40	42	.488	19.0	24‍–‍17	16‍–‍25	7–9	82
Denver Nuggets	36	46	.439	23.0	22‍–‍19	14‍–‍27	5–11	82
Utah Jazz	25	57	.305	34.0	16‍–‍25	9‍–‍32	4–12	82

Western Conference
#	Team	W	L	PCT	GB	GP
1	z-San Antonio Spurs *	62	20	.756	–	82
2	y-Oklahoma City Thunder *	59	23	.720	3.0	82
3	y-Los Angeles Clippers *	57	25	.695	5.0	82
4	x-Houston Rockets	54	28	.659	8.0	82
5	x-Portland Trail Blazers	54	28	.659	8.0	82
6	x-Golden State Warriors	51	31	.622	11.0	82
7	x-Memphis Grizzlies	50	32	.610	12.0	82
8	x-Dallas Mavericks	49	33	.598	13.0	82
9	Phoenix Suns	48	34	.585	14.0	82
10	Minnesota Timberwolves	40	42	.488	22.0	82
11	Denver Nuggets	36	46	.439	26.0	82
12	New Orleans Pelicans	34	48	.415	28.0	82
13	Sacramento Kings	28	54	.341	34.0	82
14	Los Angeles Lakers	27	55	.329	35.0	82
15	Utah Jazz	25	57	.305	37.0	82

=== Game log ===
2013–14 game log
Total: 40–42 (Home: 24–17; Road: 16–25)
October: 1–0 (home: 1–0; road: 0–0)

Game	Date	Team	Score	High points	High rebounds	High assists	Location Attendance	Record
1	October 30	Orlando	W 120–115 (OT)	Kevin Love (31)	Kevin Love (17)	Ricky Rubio (11)	Target Center; 17,988	1–0

November : 8–9 (home: 5–3; road: 3–6)

Game	Date	Team	Score	High points	High rebounds	High assists	Location Attendance	Record
2	November 1	Oklahoma City	W 100–81	Kevin Love (24)	Kevin Love (12)	Ricky Rubio (10)	Target Center; 17,433	2–0
3	November 3	@ New York	W 109–100	Kevin Love (34)	Kevin Love (15)	Ricky Rubio (10)	Madison Square Garden; 19,812	3–0
4	November 4	@ Cleveland	L 92–93	Kevin Martin (23)	Kevin Love (13)	Love & Rubio (5)	Quicken Loans Arena; 17,892	3–1
5	November 6	Golden State	L 93–106	Kevin Love (25)	Kevin Love (16)	Ricky Rubio (7)	Target Center; 15,559	3–2
6	November 8	Dallas	W 116–108	Love & Martin (32)	Kevin Love (15)	Kevin Love (8)	Target Center; 13,677	4–2
7	November 10	@ L.A. Lakers	W 113–90	Kevin Martin (27)	Kevin Love (13)	Ricky Rubio (14)	Staples Center; 18,997	5–2
8	November 11	@ L.A. Clippers	L 107–109	Kevin Martin (30)	Kevin Love (19)	Ricky Rubio (10)	Staples Center; 19,060	5–3
9	November 13	Cleveland	W 124–95	Kevin Love (33)	Kevin Love (8)	Ricky Rubio (16)	Target Center; 14,978	6–3
10	November 15	@ Denver	L 113–117	Kevin Love (28)	Kevin Love (10)	Ricky Rubio (12)	Pepsi Center; 17,142	6–4
11	November 16	Boston	W 106–88	Kevin Love (23)	Love & Peković (12)	Ricky Rubio (7)	Target Center; 15,111	7–4
12	November 19	@ Washington	L 100–104	Kevin Love (25)	Kevin Love (11)	J. J. Barea (7)	Verizon Center; 14,804	7–5
13	November 20	L.A. Clippers	L 98–102	Kevin Martin (28)	Kevin Love (12)	Kevin Love (8)	Target Center; 13,101	7–6
14	November 22	Brooklyn	W 111–81	Kevin Love (17)	Kevin Love (16)	Ricky Rubio (8)	Target Center; 15,551	8–6
15	November 23	@ Houston	L 101–112	Kevin Love (27)	Kevin Love (15)	Ricky Rubio (8)	Toyota Center; 18,196	8–7
16	November 25	@ Indiana	L 84–98	Kevin Love (20)	Kevin Love (17)	Ricky Rubio (7)	Bankers Life Fieldhouse; 16,426	8–8
17	November 27	Denver	L 110–117	Kevin Martin (29)	Kevin Love (15)	Ricky Rubio (11)	Target Center; 14,244	8–9
18	November 30	@ Dallas	W 112–106	Kevin Martin (27)	Kevin Love (11)	Ricky Rubio (7)	American Airlines Center; 20,173	9–9

December : 6–7 (home: 3–2; road: 3–5)

Game	Date	Team	Score	High points	High rebounds	High assists	Location Attendance	Record
19	December 1	@ Oklahoma City	L 103–113	Kevin Martin (24)	Kevin Love (12)	Ricky Rubio (7)	Chesapeake Energy Arena; 18,203	9–10
20	December 4	San Antonio	Game postponed. Rescheduled to April 8, 2014.					
21	December 7	Miami	L 82–103	Kevin Martin (19)	Nikola Peković (12)	Ricky Rubio (6)	Target Center; 19,888	9–11
22	December 10	@ Detroit	W 121–94	Kevin Love (26)	Kevin Love (16)	Ricky Rubio (9)	Palace of Auburn Hills; 11,251	10–11
23	December 11	Philadelphia	W 106–99	Kevin Love (26)	Kevin Love (15)	Ricky Rubio (7)	Target Center; 13,450	11–11
24	December 13	@ San Antonio	L 110–117	Kevin Love (42)	Kevin Love (14)	Ricky Rubio (8)	AT&T Center; 18,581	11–12
25	December 15	@ Memphis	W 101–93	Kevin Love (30)	Corey Brewer (12)	J. J. Barea (5)	FedExForum; 15,417	12–12
26	December 16	@ Boston	L 97–101	Kevin Love (27)	Kevin Love (14)	J. J. Barea (11)	TD Garden; 17,071	12–13
27	December 18	Portland	W 120–109	Nikola Peković (30)	Kevin Love (15)	Kevin Love (9)	Target Center; 13,776	13–13
28	December 20	@ L.A. Lakers	L 91–104	Kevin Love (25)	Kevin Love (13)	Ricky Rubio (7)	Staples Center; 18,997	13–14
29	December 22	@ L.A. Clippers	L 116–120 (OT)	Kevin Love (45)	Kevin Love (19)	Ricky Rubio (12)	Staples Center; 19,304	13–15
30	December 27	Washington	W 120–98	Kevin Love (25)	Kevin Love (11)	Ricky Rubio (9)	Target Center; 16,473	14–15
31	December 28	@ Milwaukee	W 117–95	Kevin Love (33)	Kevin Love (15)	Ricky Rubio (8)	BMO Harris Bradley Center; 14,971	15–15
32	December 30	Dallas	L 98–100	Kevin Love (36)	Kevin Love (11)	Ricky Rubio (13)	Target Center; 16,111	15–16

January : 8–7 (home: 4–4; road: 4–3)

Game	Date	Team	Score	High points	High rebounds	High assists	Location Attendance	Record
33	January 1	New Orleans	W 124–112	Nikola Peković (22)	Ricky Rubio (8)	Ricky Rubio (9)	Target Center; 14,002	16–16
34	January 4	Oklahoma City	L 111–115	Nikola Peković (31)	Kevin Love (14)	Ricky Rubio (10)	Target Center; 18,065	16–17
35	January 6	@ Philadelphia	W 126–95	Kevin Love (26)	Nikola Peković (14)	Ricky Rubio (8)	Wells Fargo Center; 10,736	17–17
36	January 8	Phoenix	L 103–104	Kevin Martin (20)	Kevin Love & Nikola Peković (12)	Ricky Rubio (8)	Target Center; 12,202	17–18
37	January 10	Charlotte	W 119–92	Nikola Peković (26)	Kevin Love (14)	Ricky Rubio & Dante Cunningham (6)	Target Center; 13,767	18–18
38	January 12	@ San Antonio	L 86–104	Nikola Peković (22)	Kevin Love (7)	Ricky Rubio (8)	AT&T Center; 18,098	18–19
39	January 15	Sacramento	L 108–111	Kevin Love (27)	Kevin Love (11)	Ricky Rubio & Kevin Love (5)	Target Center; 12,399	18–20
40	January 17	@ Toronto	L 89–94	Kevin Martin (18)	Kevin Love (12)	Jose Barea (5)	Air Canada Centre; 19,800	18–21
41	January 18	Utah	W 98–72	Nikola Peković (27)	Nikola Peković (14)	Ricky Rubio (9)	Target Center; 17,111	19–21
42	January 21	@ Utah	W 112–97	Love & Brewer (19)	Kevin Love (13)	Ricky Rubio (13)	EnergySolutions Arena; 16,387	20–21
43	January 24	@ Golden State	W 121–120	Love & Martin (26)	Love & Pekovic (14)	Ricky Rubio (12)	Oracle Arena; 19,596	21–21
44	January 25	@ Portland	L 104–115	Kevin Martin (30)	Kevin Love (13)	Ricky Rubio (11)	Moda Center; 20,006	21–22
45	January 27	@ Chicago	W 95–86	Kevin Love (31)	Kevin Love (8)	J. J. Barea (7)	United Center; 21,637	22–22
46	January 29	New Orleans	W 88–77	Kevin Love (30)	Kevin Love (14)	Ricky Rubio (6)	Target Center; 11,702	23–22
47	January 31	Memphis	L 90–94	Kevin Love (28)	Kevin Love (16)	Ricky Rubio (8)	Target Center; 17,429	23–23

February : 5–6 (home: 3–2; road: 2–4)

Game	Date	Team	Score	High points	High rebounds	High assists	Location Attendance	Record
48	February 1	@ Atlanta	L 113–120	Kevin Love (43)	Kevin Love (19)	Ricky Rubio (11)	Philips Arena; 13,018	23–24
49	February 4	L.A. Lakers	W 109–99	Kevin Martin (32)	Kevin Love (17)	Ricky Rubio (13)	Target Center; 12,559	24–24
50	February 5	@ Oklahoma City	L 97–106	Ricky Rubio (19)	Dante Cunningham (8)	Ricky Rubio (5)	Chesapeake Energy Arena; 18,203	24–25
51	February 7	@ New Orleans	L 91–98	Kevin Love (26)	Kevin Love (19)	Ricky Rubio (6)	Smoothie King Center; 16,541	24–26
52	February 8	Portland	L 110–117	Corey Brewer (26)	Ronny Turiaf (13)	Ricky Rubio (9)	Target Center; 17,506	24–27
53	February 10	Houston	L 89–107	Kevin Love (31)	Kevin Love (10)	Ricky Rubio (9)	Target Center; 12,002	24–28
54	February 12	Denver	W 117–90	Kevin Love (32)	Kevin Love (11)	Ricky Rubio (12)	Target Center; 12,139	25–28
All-Star Break
55	February 19	Indiana	W 104–91	Kevin Love (42)	Kevin Love (16)	Ricky Rubio (17)	Target Center	26–28
56	February 22	@ Utah	W 121–104	Kevin Love (37)	Kevin Love (12)	Kevin Love (10)	EnergySolutions Arena	27–28
57	February 23	@ Portland	L 97–108	Kevin Love (31)	Kevin Love (10)	Ricky Rubio (11)	Moda Center; 19,458	27–29
58	February 25	@ Phoenix	W 110–101	Kevin Love (33)	Kevin Love (13)	Ricky Rubio (11)	US Airways Center; 16,273	28–29

March : 8–8 (home: 5–4; road: 3–4)

Game	Date	Team	Score	High points	High rebounds	High assists	Location Attendance	Record
59	March 1	@ Sacramento	W 108–97	Kevin Martin (26)	Kevin Love (10)	Ricky Rubio (8)	Sleep Train Arena; 17,085	29-29
60	March 3	@ Denver	W 132–128	Kevin Love (33)	Kevin Love (19)	Ricky Rubio & Jose Barea (5)	Pepsi Center; 15,240	30–29
61	March 5	New York	L 106–118	Kevin Love (19)	Kevin Love (8)	Ricky Rubio (8)	Target Center; 14,294	30-30
62	March 7	Detroit	W 114–101	Kevin Love (28)	Kevin Love (14)	Ricky Rubio (9)	Target Center; 16,242	31–30
63	March 9	Toronto	L 104–111	Kevin Love (26)	Love & Peković (11)	Kevin Love (9)	Target Center; 13,116	31-31
64	March 11	Milwaukee	W 112–101	Kevin Love (27)	Kevin Love (10)	Ricky Rubio (10)	Target Center; 12,473	32–31
65	March 14	@ Charlotte	L 93–105	Kevin Martin (19)	Kevin Love (6)	Ricky Rubio (9)	Time Warner Cable Arena; 16,983	32-32
66	March 16	Sacramento	W 104–102	Kevin Martin (31)	Gorgui Dieng (11)	Ricky Rubio (9)	Target Center; 13,171	33–32
67	March 19	@ Dallas	W 123–122 (OT)	Kevin Love (35)	Gorgui Dieng (11)	Ricky Rubio (15)	American Airlines Center; 20,100	34–32
68	March 20	@ Houston	L 106–129	Kevin Love (29)	Gorgui Dieng (21)	Ricky Rubio (8)	Toyota Center; 18,315	34–33
69	March 23	Phoenix	L 120–127	Kevin Love (36)	Kevin Love (14)	Love & Rubio (9)	Target Center; 17,866	34-34
70	March 24	@ Memphis	L 92–109	Kevin Love (16)	Gorgui Dieng (17)	Alexey Shved (5)	FedExForum; 17,784	34–35
71	March 26	Atlanta	W 107–83	Brewer & Martin (18)	Gorgui Dieng (15)	Ricky Rubio (10)	Target Center; 11,632	35-35
72	March 28	L.A. Lakers	W 143–107	Nikola Peković (26)	Kevin Love (10)	Kevin Love (10)	Target Center; 16,442	36–35
73	March 30	@ Brooklyn	L 99–114	Martin & Brewer (21)	Gorgui Dieng (11)	Ricky Rubio (12)	Barclays Center; 17,732	36-36
74	March 31	L.A. Clippers	L 94–114	Kevin Love (20)	Kevin Love (13)	J. J. Barea (8)	Target Center; 12,172	36–37

April: 4–5 (home: 3–2; road: 1–3)

Game	Date	Team	Score	High points	High rebounds	High assists	Location Attendance	Record
75	April 2	Memphis	W 102–88	Kevin Love (24)	Kevin Love (16)	Kevin Love (10)	Target Center; 12,009	37-37
76	April 4	@ Miami	W 122–121 (2OT)	Kevin Love (28)	Kevin Love (11)	Ricky Rubio (14)	American Airlines Arena; 19,661	38–37
77	April 5	@ Orlando	L 92–100	Ricky Rubio (18)	Gorgui Dieng (8)	Ricky Rubio (10)	Amway Center; 16,992	38-38
20	April 8	San Antonio	W 110–91	Ricky Rubio (23)	Gorgui Dieng (15)	Ricky Rubio (7)	Target Center; 10,117	39–38
78	April 9	Chicago	L 87–102	Kevin Love (17)	Kevin Love (10)	Ricky Rubio (6)	Target Center; 13,447	39-39
79	April 11	Houston	W 112–110	Corey Brewer (51)	Gorgui Dieng (20)	Ricky Rubio (10)	Target Center; 16,689	40–39
80	April 13	@ Sacramento	L 103–106	Kevin Love (43)	Gorgui Dieng (14)	Ricky Rubio (11)	Sleep Train Arena; 16,965	40-40
81	April 14	@ Golden State	L 120–130	Kevin Love (40)	Kevin Love (14)	Kevin Love (9)	Oracle Arena; 19,596	40–41
82	April 16	Utah	L 130–136 (2OT)	Kevin Martin (36)	Kevin Love (10)	Kevin Love (9)	Target Center; 14,155	40–42

2013–14 season schedule

== Player statistics ==
=== Regular season ===
Player	POS	GP	GS	MP	REB	AST	STL	BLK	PTS	MPG	RPG	APG	SPG	BPG	PPG
Ricky Rubio	PG	82	82	2,638	342	704	191	11	781	32.2	4.2	8.6	2.3	.1	9.5
Corey Brewer	SF	81	81	2,609	207	135	151	30	998	32.2	2.6	1.7	1.9	.4	12.3
Dante Cunningham	PF	81	7	1,635	330	83	62	58	510	20.2	4.1	1.0	.8	.7	6.3
J. J. Barea	PG	79	1	1,471	154	303	26	0	660	18.6	1.9	3.8	.3	.0	8.4
Kevin Love	PF	77	77	2,797	963	341	59	35	2,010	36.3	12.5	4.4	.8	.5	26.1
Kevin Martin	SG	68	68	2,177	203	121	66	6	1,298	32.0	3.0	1.8	1.0	.1	19.1
Alexey Shved	SG	63	0	664	81	68	26	16	250	10.5	1.3	1.1	.4	.3	4.0
Gorgui Dieng	C	60	15	818	300	39	30	50	286	13.6	5.0	.7	.5	.8	4.8
Luc Mbah a Moute^{†}	PF	55	2	807	119	21	21	9	184	14.7	2.2	.4	.4	.2	3.3
Nikola Peković	C	54	54	1,663	468	50	30	23	944	30.8	8.7	.9	.6	.4	17.5
Robbie Hummel	SF	53	5	655	132	23	16	2	181	12.4	2.5	.4	.3	.0	3.4
Chase Budinger	SF	41	8	751	103	31	19	2	274	18.3	2.5	.8	.5	.0	6.7
Shabazz Muhammad	SG	37	0	290	53	6	8	1	143	7.8	1.4	.2	.2	.0	3.9
Ronny Turiaf	C	31	10	606	174	24	8	50	149	19.5	5.6	.8	.3	1.6	4.8
A. J. Price	SG	28	0	99	10	13	1	0	44	3.5	.4	.5	.0	.0	1.6
Derrick Williams^{†}	PF	11	0	162	26	1	4	4	54	14.7	2.4	.1	.4	.4	4.9
Othyus Jeffers^{†}	SG	2	0	13	3	0	0	0	2	6.5	1.5	.0	.0	.0	1.0

- ^{†} Denotes player spent time with another team in the season. Stats reflect time with the Timberwolves only.
