= Gorgui Dieng =

Senegalese basketball player (born 1990)

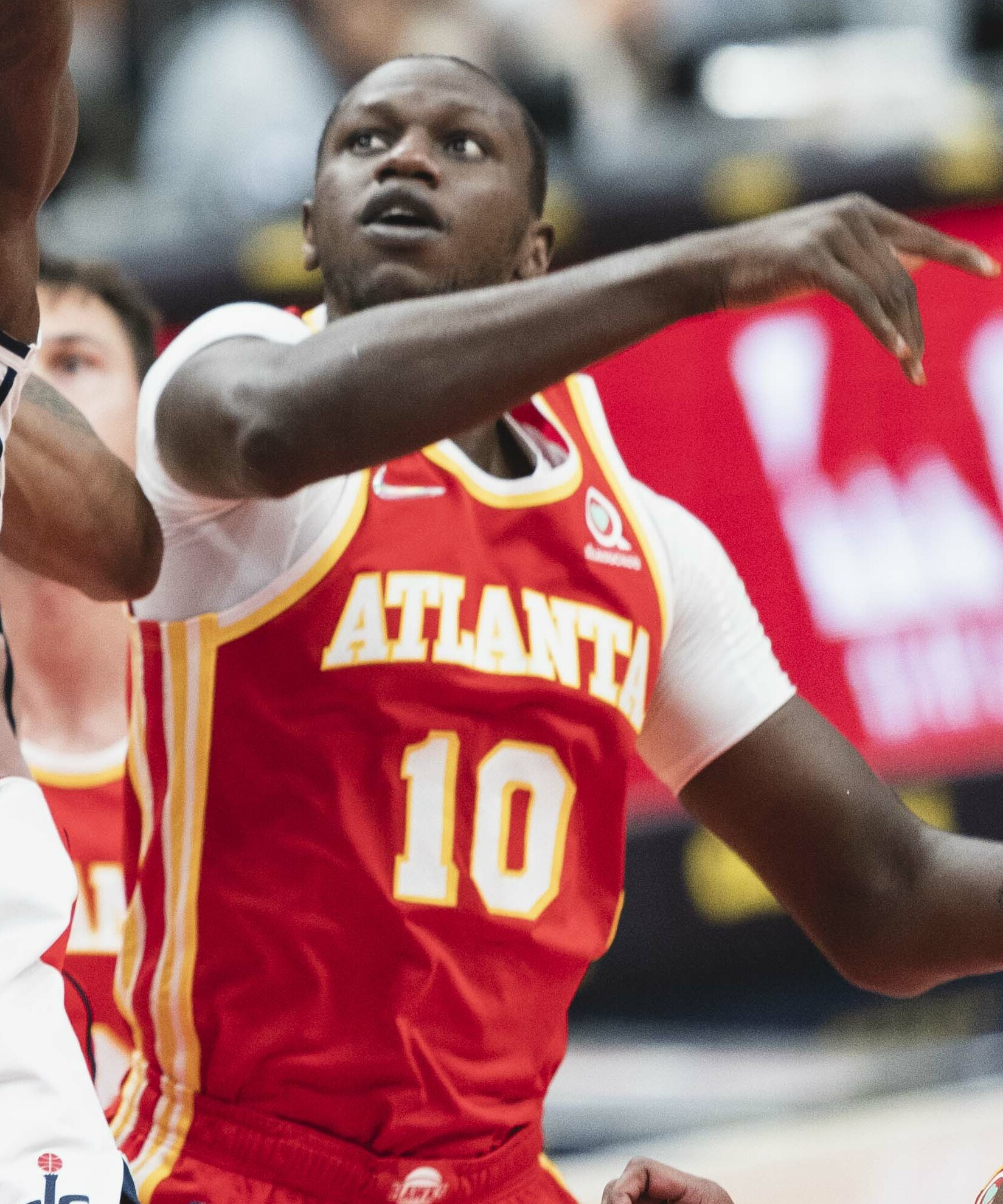
- Dieng with the Atlanta Hawks in 2021

San Antonio Spurs
- Title: Basketball Operations Representative
- League: NBA

Personal information
- Born: January 18, 1990 (age 36) Kébémer, Senegal
- Listed height: 6 ft 10 in (2.08 m)
- Listed weight: 248 lb (112 kg)

Career information
- High school: SEEDS Academy (Thiès, Senegal); Huntington Prep (Huntington, West Virginia)
- College: Louisville (2010–2013)
- NBA draft: 2013: 1st round, 21st overall pick
- Drafted by: Utah Jazz
- Playing career: 2013–2023
- Position: Center
- Number: 5, 14, 7, 10, 41

Career history
- 2013–2020: Minnesota Timberwolves
- 2020–2021: Memphis Grizzlies
- 2021: San Antonio Spurs
- 2021–2022: Atlanta Hawks
- 2022–2023: San Antonio Spurs

Career highlights
- NBA All-Rookie Second Team (2014); NCAA champion (2013)*; Big East Defensive Player of the Year (2013); First-team All-Big East (2013); *Later vacated
- Stats at NBA.com
- Stats at Basketball Reference
Medals
Men's basketball
Representing Senegal
AfroBasket
| Bronze medal – third place | 2017 Tunisia/Senegal |
| Bronze medal – third place | 2021 Rwanda |

Gorgui Sy Dieng (/ˈɡɔːrɡi ˈdʒɛŋ/; GOR-ghee JENG; born January 18, 1990) is a Senegalese basketball executive and former professional player currently serving as a basketball operations representative with the San Antonio Spurs of the National Basketball Association (NBA). He played college basketball for the Louisville Cardinals.

Dieng was selected as the 21st overall pick in the 2013 NBA draft by the Utah Jazz and was traded on draft night to the Minnesota Timberwolves. He spent seven seasons with the team before being dealt to the Memphis Grizzlies in February 2020. He reached a contract buyout agreement with the Grizzlies in March 2021 and joined the San Antonio Spurs in free agency. He signed with the Hawks in August 2021. In July 2022, he returned to the Spurs. On December 9, 2023, Dieng retired from basketball.

== High school career ==
Dieng attended the Sports for Education and Economic Development (SEEDS) Academy in Thiès, Senegal. While at SEEDS, Dieng had a 3.2 GPA. Dieng played in the national Nationale 1 league with US Rail, and helped the team win the Senegalese Cup in 2009, scoring 19 points in the final and being named final MVP.

He was invited to the Basketball Without Borders camp in South Africa in 2009 as one of 60 promising players selected from across Africa, and was named MVP of the camp.

Dieng transferred to Huntington Prep in West Virginia for the 2009–10 school year, where he played for coach Rob Fulford. He averaged 15.4 points, 12.6 rebounds and 7.2 blocks per game during his senior season at Huntington Prep.

=== Recruiting ===
Dieng was recruited by Marquette, Marshall, Colorado, and Louisville among others who came in late. His high school coach Rob Fulford said "Academics are no question, He passed the SAT six months after learning English and passed with 400 points to spare." The most interest was from Louisville and Marshall. Then on March 30, 2010, head coach Donnie Jones left Marshall to become the head coach of the University of Central Florida. The next day, Rick Pitino signed a contract extension through 2017 with Louisville. On April 26, 2010, Dieng verbally committed to Louisville. Louisville assistant coach Walter McCarty, who has NBA experience, helped Rick Pitino land Dieng in a Cardinals uniform.

Considered a four-star recruit by Rivals.com, Dieng was listed as the No. 10 power forward and the No. 44 player in the nation in 2010.

== College career ==
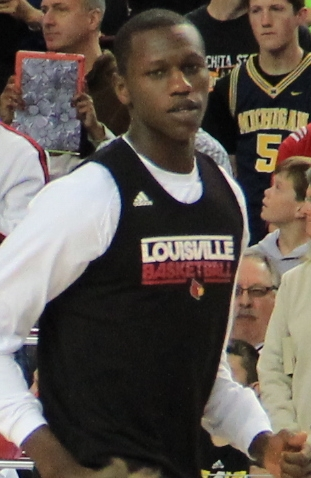
Dieng in 2013 with Louisville

Dieng was ruled ineligible by the NCAA when he first arrived at Louisville forcing them to hold him out of practice and individual workouts. Louisville appealed the NCAA's decision and on October 26, 2010, it was announced that the NCAA reversed its original decision and ruled Dieng eligible immediately. As a freshman Dieng saw action in 29 games averaging 16 mins a game. He scored 5.7 points a game, pulled down 4.4 rebounds and blocked 1.9 shots a game in his limited action. The Cardinals finished the 2010–11 season with a 25–10 record, 12–6 in Big East play tied for 3rd and lost in the championship game of the 2011 Big East men's basketball tournament to Connecticut. They received an at-large bid and a #4 seed in the 2011 NCAA Men's Division I Basketball Tournament where they were upset in the first round by #13 seeded Morehead State.

As a sophomore, Dieng started at center for the 2011–12 Louisville team that reached the Final Four of the NCAA tournament. In the 2011–12 season, Dieng led the Big East Conference in blocks, and set the all-time school record for blocks in a season. On March 22, 2012, Dieng matched a Louisville tournament record with 7 blocks in a game in a 57–44 Sweet 16 victory over Michigan State.

Dieng was named as a student representative to the board of directors of the U of L athletic department for the 2012–13 school year, succeeding his graduated teammate Kyle Kuric.

Despite being a junior, Dieng was honored on Senior Day in 2013, due to the fact that he would forgo his last year at Louisville to enter the 2013 NBA draft.

=== College awards and honors ===
- NCAA champion (2013)
- Big East Defensive Player of the Year (2013)
- First team All-Big East (2013)
- Big East All-Tournament Team (2012)
- 2nd in all time blocks in Cardinal history (267 blocks)

== Professional career ==
=== Minnesota Timberwolves (2013–2020) ===
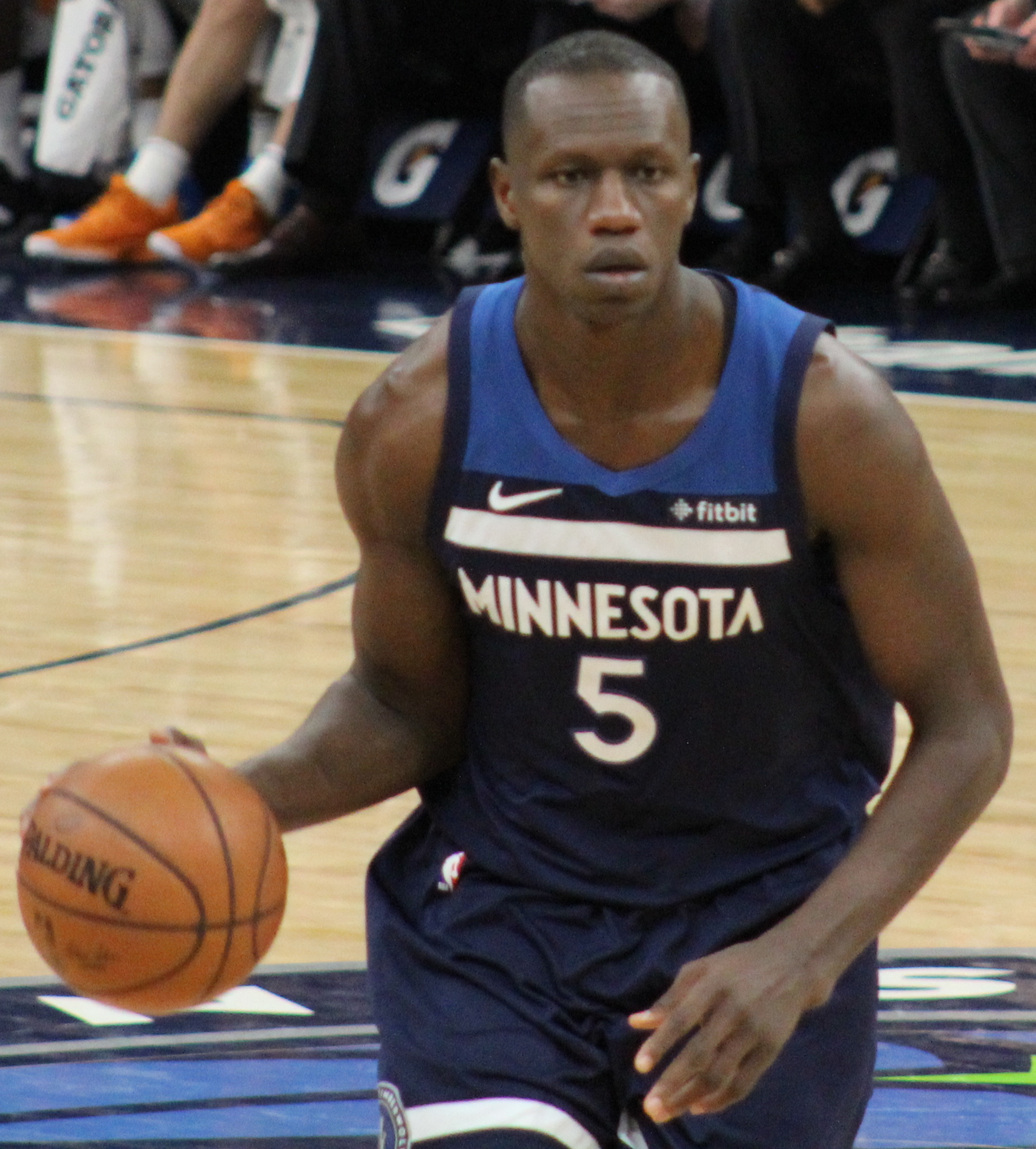
Dieng with the Timberwolves in 2019

On June 27, 2013, Dieng was selected by the Utah Jazz with the 21st overall pick in the 2013 NBA draft, and then traded to the Minnesota Timberwolves along with Shabazz Muhammad the 14th pick later that night in exchange for the 9th pick Trey Burke. On March 20, 2014, in a game against the Houston Rockets, Dieng recorded 22 points and 21 rebounds, the first ever 20–20 game by a rookie in Timberwolves' franchise history. He also became just the sixth player since the NBA began tracking starts in 1970 to have at least 20 points and 20 rebounds within their first three career starts. On April 11, also against the Rockets, Dieng scored the game-winning basket with 4.6 seconds left and finished with 12 points and 20 rebounds. As a result of his improvements throughout the second half of the season, Dieng was named to the NBA All-Rookie second team.

On January 12, 2015, Dieng tied his career high of 22 points in a loss to the Denver Nuggets. On January 28, he was named a representative of Team World to compete in the 2015 Rising Stars Challenge.

On August 1, 2015, Dieng played for Team Africa at the 2015 NBA Africa exhibition game.

On December 20, 2015, Dieng had a then season-best game with 20 points and 10 rebounds in a 100–85 win over the Brooklyn Nets. On February 6, 2016, he recorded a career-high 24 points, 13 rebounds and seven assists in a 112–105 win over the Chicago Bulls.

On October 31, 2016, Dieng signed a four-year, $64 million contract extension with the Timberwolves. On January 15, 2017, he scored a season-high 21 points in a 98–87 loss to the Dallas Mavericks. On March 30, 2017, he recorded 11 points, a season-high 15 rebounds, six assists and three blocks in a 119–104 win over the Los Angeles Lakers.

=== Memphis Grizzlies (2020–2021) ===
On February 6, 2020, Dieng was acquired by the Memphis Grizzlies in a three-team trade also involving the Miami Heat. The Grizzlies also acquired Justise Winslow and Dion Waiters who was later waived. The Heat acquired Andre Iguodala, Solomon Hill and Jae Crowder while the Timberwolves acquired James Johnson.

On March 26, 2021, Dieng and the Grizzlies reached a contract buyout agreement.

=== San Antonio Spurs (2021) ===
On March 29, 2021, Dieng signed with the San Antonio Spurs. He averaged 5.3 PPG, 2.6 RPG, and 1.2 APG in 16 games played off the bench with the Spurs.

=== Atlanta Hawks (2021–2022) ===
On August 9, 2021, Dieng signed a 1-year, $4 million contract with the Atlanta Hawks.

=== Return to San Antonio (2022–2023) ===
On July 5, 2022, Dieng signed a contract to return to the San Antonio Spurs. On January 5, 2023, he was waived by the Spurs. Three days later, he signed a 10-day contract with the Spurs. On January 20, he signed a second 10-day contract with San Antonio. On February 10, Dieng re-signed with the Spurs for the remainder of the season.

On December 9, 2023, Dieng revealed in an interview with the San Antonio Express-News that he had officially retired from professional basketball.

== Career statistics ==
Legend
| GP | Games played | GS | Games started | MPG | Minutes per game |
| FG% | Field goal percentage | 3P% | 3-point field goal percentage | FT% | Free throw percentage |
| RPG | Rebounds per game | APG | Assists per game | SPG | Steals per game |
| BPG | Blocks per game | PPG | Points per game | **Bold** | Career high |
| * | Led the league |

=== NBA ===
==== Regular season ====
| Year | Team | GP | GS | MPG | FG% | 3P% | FT% | RPG | APG | SPG | BPG | PPG |
|---|---|---|---|---|---|---|---|---|---|---|---|---|
| 2013–14 | Minnesota | 60 | 15 | 13.6 | .498 | **1.000** | .634 | 5.0 | .7 | .5 | .8 | 4.8 |
| 2014–15 | Minnesota | 73 | 49 | 30.0 | .506 | .167 | .783 | **8.3** | **2.0** | 1.0 | **1.7** | 9.7 |
| 2015–16 | Minnesota | **82*** | 39 | 27.1 | **.532** | .300 | .827 | 7.1 | 1.7 | **1.1** | 1.2 | **10.1** |
| 2016–17 | Minnesota | **82*** | **82*** | **32.4** | .502 | .372 | .814 | 7.9 | 1.9 | **1.1** | 1.2 | 10.0 |
| 2017–18 | Minnesota | 79 | 0 | 16.9 | .479 | .311 | .775 | 4.6 | .9 | .6 | .5 | 5.9 |
| 2018–19 | Minnesota | 76 | 2 | 13.6 | .501 | .339 | .830 | 4.1 | .9 | .6 | .5 | 6.4 |
| 2019–20 | Minnesota | 46 | 17 | 16.9 | .448 | .383 | .797 | 5.6 | 1.3 | .8 | .9 | 7.4 |
| 2019–20 | Memphis | 17 | 0 | 18.7 | .483 | .250 | .738 | 5.8 | .9 | .8 | 1.0 | 7.2 |
| 2020–21 | Memphis | 22 | 1 | 16.9 | .519 | .479 | **.884** | 4.5 | 1.3 | .8 | .6 | 7.9 |
| 2020–21 | San Antonio | 16 | 0 | 11.3 | .527 | .318 | .833 | 2.6 | 1.2 | .6 | .1 | 5.3 |
| 2021–22 | Atlanta | 44 | 3 | 8.4 | .473 | .426 | .731 | 2.8 | .8 | .3 | .3 | 3.5 |
| 2022–23 | San Antonio | 31 | 1 | 11.5 | .385 | .280 | .769 | 3.5 | 1.7 | .1 | .5 | 3.9 |
| Career | | 628 | 209 | 20.9 | .496 | .355 | .791 | 5.6 | 1.3 | .7 | .9 | 7.3 |

==== Playoffs ====
| Year | Team | GP | GS | MPG | FG% | 3P% | FT% | RPG | APG | SPG | BPG | PPG |
|---|---|---|---|---|---|---|---|---|---|---|---|---|
| 2018 | Minnesota | **5** | 0 | **14.0** | .333 | **.400** | .750 | **3.6** | **.8** | **.4** | **.8** | **3.4** |
| 2022 | Atlanta | 2 | 0 | 5.0 | **.500** | .000 | **1.000** | 1.5 | .0 | .0 | .0 | 1.5 |
| Career | | 7 | 0 | 11.4 | .350 | .333 | .800 | 3.0 | .6 | .3 | .6 | 2.9 |

=== College ===
| Year | Team | GP | GS | MPG | FG% | 3P% | FT% | RPG | APG | SPG | BPG | PPG |
|---|---|---|---|---|---|---|---|---|---|---|---|---|
| 2010–11 | Louisville | 29 | 9 | 15.6 | .618 | .000 | .538 | 4.4 | .7 | .4 | 1.9 | 5.7 |
| 2011–12 | Louisville | 40 | 40 | 32.8 | .525 | .500 | .676 | 9.1 | 1.1 | 1.2 | 3.2 | 9.1 |
| 2012–13 | Louisville | 33 | 32 | 31.1 | .534 | — | .652 | 9.4 | 2.0 | 1.3 | 2.5 | 9.8 |
| Career | | 102 | 81 | 27.3 | .545 | .333 | .640 | 7.9 | 1.2 | 1.0 | 2.6 | 8.3 |

== International career ==
Dieng represented the Senegalese national basketball team during the 2014 FIBA Basketball World Cup where he averaged 16.0 points and 10.7 rebounds in six games. He also played at the AfroBasket tournaments in 2015, 2017 and 2021, making the All-Tournament Team in all three years.

== Post-playing career ==
On December 9, 2023, Dieng announced his retirement from professional basketball and was named Basketball Operations Representative by the San Antonio Spurs.

== Personal life ==
Dieng is known for his philanthropic work. He set up the Gorgui Dieng Foundation in 2015, which has provided aid including medical equipment and supplies to improve healthcare in his native Senegal. In 2019 he became the third player to receive the Offseason NBA Cares Community Assist Award. Dieng is a practicing Muslim.

Gorgui means "the old one" in Dieng's native language Wolof.
