= 2010 NBA Finals =

2010 basketball championship series

Team	Coach	Wins
Los Angeles Lakers	Phil Jackson	4
Boston Celtics	Doc Rivers	3
- Dates: June 3–17
- MVP: Kobe Bryant (Los Angeles Lakers)
- Hall of Famers: Celtics: Ray Allen (2018); Kevin Garnett (2020); Paul Pierce (2021); Lakers: Kobe Bryant (2020); Pau Gasol (2023); Coaches: Phil Jackson (2007); Doc Rivers (2026); Officials: Danny Crawford (2025); Joey Crawford (2026)
- Eastern finals: Celtics defeated Magic, 4–2
- Western finals: Lakers defeated Suns, 4–2

The 2010 NBA Finals was the championship series of the National Basketball Association's (NBA) 2009–10 season and conclusion of the season's playoffs, held from June 3 to 17, 2010. A best-of-seven playoff series, it was contested between the Western Conference champion and defending champion Los Angeles Lakers, and the Eastern Conference champion Boston Celtics. It was their twelfth Finals meeting overall, and their most recent to date.

The Lakers earned home court advantage for finishing the regular season with a better record. After the Lakers won the opening game at home, the Celtics led 3–2 entering Game 6 before the Lakers won the next two games. Kobe Bryant was named the Most Valuable Player of the Finals for the second consecutive year.

This was the only Finals in the 2010s that didn't feature LeBron James or Stephen Curry.

== Background ==
The Lakers had won the previous season's NBA Finals against the Orlando Magic for the franchise's 15th championship. The Celtics won their previous NBA Finals appearance against the Lakers in 2008. This was the 12th Finals played between the two rival teams. The Celtics won nine of their previous 11 Finals meetings against the Lakers, winning in 1959, 1962, 1963, 1965, 1966, 1968, 1969, 1984, and 2008, while the Lakers won in 1985 and 1987.

=== 2010 NBA playoffs ===
Los Angeles Lakers (Western Conference champion)		Boston Celtics (Eastern Conference champion)
# / Western Conference; # / Team / W / L / PCT / GB; 1 / c-Los Angeles Lakers / 57 / 25 / .695 / –; 2 / y-Dallas Mavericks / 55 / 27 / .671 / 2; 3 / x-Phoenix Suns / 54 / 28 / .659 / 3; 4 / y-Denver Nuggets / 53 / 29 / .646 / 4; 5 / x-Utah Jazz / 53 / 29 / .646 / 4; 6 / x-Portland Trail Blazers / 50 / 32 / .610 / 7; 7 / x-San Antonio Spurs / 50 / 32 / .610 / 7; 8 / x-Oklahoma City Thunder / 50 / 32 / .610 / 7; 9 / Houston Rockets / 42 / 40 / .512 / 15; 10 / Memphis Grizzlies / 40 / 42 / .488 / 17; 11 / New Orleans Hornets / 37 / 45 / .451 / 20; 12 / Los Angeles Clippers / 29 / 53 / .354 / 28; 13 / Golden State Warriors / 26 / 56 / .317 / 31; 14 / Sacramento Kings / 25 / 57 / .305 / 32; 15 / Minnesota Timberwolves / 15 / 67 / .183 / 42; 1st seed in the West, 3rd best league record	Regular season	# / Eastern Conference; # / Team / W / L / PCT / GB; 1 / z-Cleveland Cavaliers / 61 / 21 / .744 / –; 2 / y-Orlando Magic / 59 / 23 / .720 / 2; 3 / x-Atlanta Hawks / 53 / 29 / .646 / 8; 4 / y-Boston Celtics / 50 / 32 / .610 / 11; 5 / x-Miami Heat / 47 / 35 / .573 / 14; 6 / x-Milwaukee Bucks / 46 / 36 / .561 / 15; 7 / x-Charlotte Bobcats / 44 / 38 / .537 / 17; 8 / x-Chicago Bulls / 41 / 41 / .500 / 20; 9 / Toronto Raptors / 40 / 42 / .488 / 21; 10 / Indiana Pacers / 32 / 50 / .390 / 29; 11 / New York Knicks / 29 / 53 / .354 / 32; 12 / Philadelphia 76ers / 27 / 55 / .329 / 34; 13 / Detroit Pistons / 27 / 55 / .329 / 34; 14 / Washington Wizards / 26 / 56 / .317 / 35; 15 / New Jersey Nets / 12 / 70 / .146 / 49; 4th seed in the East, 9th best league record
Defeated the (8) Oklahoma City Thunder, 4–2	First round	Defeated the (5) Miami Heat, 4–1
Defeated the (5) Utah Jazz, 4–0	Conference semifinals	Defeated the (1) Cleveland Cavaliers, 4–2
Defeated the (3) Phoenix Suns, 4–2	Conference finals	Defeated the (2) Orlando Magic, 4–2

=== Regular-season series ===
The regular season series was split, with each team winning on the opponent's court by a point:

January 31, 2010

Recap

Los Angeles Lakers 90, Boston Celtics 89

TD Garden, Boston, Massachusetts

February 18, 2010

Recap

Boston Celtics 87, Los Angeles Lakers 86

Staples Center, Los Angeles, California

In their January 31, 2010 match-up at TD Garden, Kobe Bryant sank a jumpshot over Ray Allen with 7.3 seconds left, to give the Lakers their third consecutive victory over the Celtics. That streak would be snapped in their next meeting on February 18, 2010. Without Bryant, who was missing his fourth straight game, the Lakers lost at Staples Center when Derek Fisher missed a fadeaway 21-footer as time expired, giving Boston the 87–86 win. After Fisher's miss, Kevin Garnett drew the ire of Lakers fans for exuberantly throwing his wristband into the crowd. The evenly matched games in the regular season was a sign of things to come in the 2010 Finals, with five of the seven games being decided by nine points or less.

=== Boston Celtics ===
The Celtics finished the regular season as the Atlantic Division champion with a 50–32 record. As the No. 4 seed in the Eastern Conference, they eliminated the No. 5 seeded Miami Heat in five games during the first round of the playoffs. Then in the conference semifinals, the Celtics defeated the Cleveland Cavaliers in six games, the earliest that a top seed has been eliminated since the Dallas Mavericks' first-round loss to the Golden State Warriors in 2007. In the Eastern Conference finals, the Celtics went on to eliminate the Orlando Magic in six games. In reaching the Finals, the Celtics became the first team in NBA history to do so with a better regular season road record than home. The Celtics became the second team in NBA history to reach the NBA Finals after beating the team with the best record, Cleveland Cavaliers, and the team with the second-best record in the league, Orlando Magic, after the Houston Rockets did it in their championship season of 1995.

=== Los Angeles Lakers ===
After the Lakers won the Finals in the preceding year, the team management made changes to the roster. Trevor Ariza departed to the Houston Rockets and was replaced by free agent Ron Artest. Assistant coach and former head coach Kurt Rambis moved to a head coaching position with the Minnesota Timberwolves. The Lakers finished the regular season as the Pacific Division champion, compiling a 57–25 record. On February 1, Bryant moved past Jerry West into 14th place on the NBA's career scoring list. He also moved past West to become the Lakers franchise scoring leader.

As the No. 1 seed in the Western Conference, they eliminated the No. 8 seeded Oklahoma City Thunder in six games during the Western Conference first round playoffs, with the final game ending when Bryant missed a jumper and Pau Gasol grabbed the offensive rebound to shoot a layup and win the game. In the Western Conference semifinals, the Lakers won against the Utah Jazz in four games, leading the team to their third straight Western Conference final. In the Western Conference finals against the Phoenix Suns, the Lakers won both of their first two games at home, and lost the next two in Phoenix both by 9 points. In Game 5, Ron Artest made an off-balance layup to beat the buzzer off a Bryant missed shot for the Lakers to win. The Lakers beat the Suns on their home floor in Game 6 led by Bryant's 37 points. The Game 6 victory gave the Lakers their 31st NBA Finals appearance in franchise history. The team also earned their third straight consecutive appearance in the Finals, with the last team to achieve such a feat being the 2000–2002 Lakers.

== Series summary ==
Game	Date	Road team	Result	Home team
Game 1	June 3	Boston Celtics	89–102 (0–1)	Los Angeles Lakers
Game 2	June 6	Boston Celtics	103–94 (1–1)	Los Angeles Lakers
Game 3	June 8	Los Angeles Lakers	91–84 (2–1)	Boston Celtics
Game 4	June 10	Los Angeles Lakers	89–96 (2–2)	Boston Celtics
Game 5	June 13	Los Angeles Lakers	86–92 (2–3)	Boston Celtics
Game 6	June 15	Boston Celtics	67–89 (3–3)	Los Angeles Lakers
Game 7	June 17	Boston Celtics	79–83 (3–4)	Los Angeles Lakers

== Game summaries ==
All times are in Eastern Daylight Time (UTC−4). If the venue is located in a different time zone, the local time is also given.

=== Game 1 ===
ABC

June 3
9:00 p.m. (6:00 p.m. PDT)

Recap
Video highlights on YouTube

Boston Celtics 89, Los Angeles Lakers 102
Scoring by quarter: 21–26, 20–24, 23–34, 25–18
Pts: Paul Pierce 24; Rebs: Paul Pierce 9 Asts: Rajon Rondo 8	Pts: Kobe Bryant 30; Rebs: Pau Gasol 14; Asts: Kobe Bryant 6
L.A. Lakers lead series, 1–0

Staples Center, Los Angeles, California
Attendance: 18,997
Referees:
- No. 17 Joey Crawford
- No. 14 Joe DeRosa
- No. 9 Derrick Stafford

Both teams started strong, playing a close game for most of the 1st quarter until a 7–2 Lakers run inspired by bench players Jordan Farmar and Shannon Brown to end the quarter. The Celtics again started the 2nd quarter strong. However, the Lakers managed to extend the lead 50–41 at the end of the first half with another run led by Ron Artest and Gasol. More of the same came in the 3rd quarter, as the Lakers matched nearly all of the Celtics' attempts to get back in the game. To end the 3rd quarter, the Lakers went on a 15–4 run to give them a 20-point lead going into the 4th quarter. While the Celtics would try to get back into the game with Nate Robinson and 2008 Finals MVP Paul Pierce, they never got closer than 11 points. The game was capped off with a three-pointer by Bryant with 3.6 seconds left, securing his 10th 30-point game in his last 11. The Celtics were outplayed by the Lakers in nearly every statistical category, in rebounding (31–42) and in second-chance points (0–16). Much of the Celtics' performance came from Kevin Garnett, who finished with 16 points (on 16 shots) and 2 rebounds. Ray Allen, who was hampered by foul trouble, finished with 12 points and 5 personal fouls.

=== Game 2 ===
ABC

June 6
8:00 p.m. (5:00 p.m. PDT)

Recap
Video highlights on YouTube

Boston Celtics 103, Los Angeles Lakers 94
Scoring by quarter: 29–22, 25–26, 18–24, 31–22
Pts: Ray Allen 32; Rebs: Rajon Rondo 12; Asts: Rajon Rondo 10	Pts: Pau Gasol 25; Rebs: Pau Gasol 8 Asts: Kobe Bryant 6
Series tied, 1–1

Staples Center, Los Angeles, California
Attendance: 18,997
Referees:
- No. 13 Monty McCutchen
- No. 24 Mike Callahan
- No. 41 Ken Mauer

The Celtics came out much more aggressively to begin Game 2. The Lakers fought back (Gasol had nine points in the quarter) and managed to reduce the Celtic's lead to seven points at the end of the 1st quarter. In the 2nd quarter, Ray Allen hit an impressive five three-pointers (only missing once) to add to the two that he hit in the first quarter. This explosive offensive output pushed the Celtics forward and allowed them to lead by as many as 14 points. Bryant and the Lakers put up a quick 7–0 run to end the first half to cut it to a 54–48 Celtics' lead. Foul trouble plagued players of both squads, with many players having three fouls going into the break. The Lakers would continue their attack and managed to take the lead 57–56 early in the 3rd. Both teams fought hard, leading to the 72–72 tie going into the 4th. The final quarter was dominated by the Celtics, though, as Rajon Rondo's 10 points in the quarter helped tie the series 1–1. Rondo finished with an impressive triple-double of 19 points, 12 rebounds and 10 assists, and Allen hit eight of 11 three-pointers, breaking a Finals record previously set by the Houston Rockets’ Kenny Smith during Game 1 of the 1995 NBA Finals.

The last Finals series to be tied at 1–1 after two games was the 2004 NBA Finals which involved the Lakers and the Detroit Pistons.

=== Game 3 ===
ABC

June 8
9:00 p.m.

Recap
Video highlights on YouTube

Los Angeles Lakers 91, Boston Celtics 84
Scoring by quarter: 26–17, 26–23, 15–21, 24–23
Pts: Kobe Bryant 29; Rebs: Bynum, Gasol 10 each Asts: Bryant, Gasol 4 each	Pts: Kevin Garnett 25; Rebs: Kendrick Perkins 11; Asts: Rajon Rondo 8
L.A. Lakers lead series, 2–1

TD Garden, Boston, Massachusetts
Attendance: 18,624
Referees:
- No. 43 Dan Crawford
- No. 55 Bill Kennedy
- No. 15 Bennett Salvatore

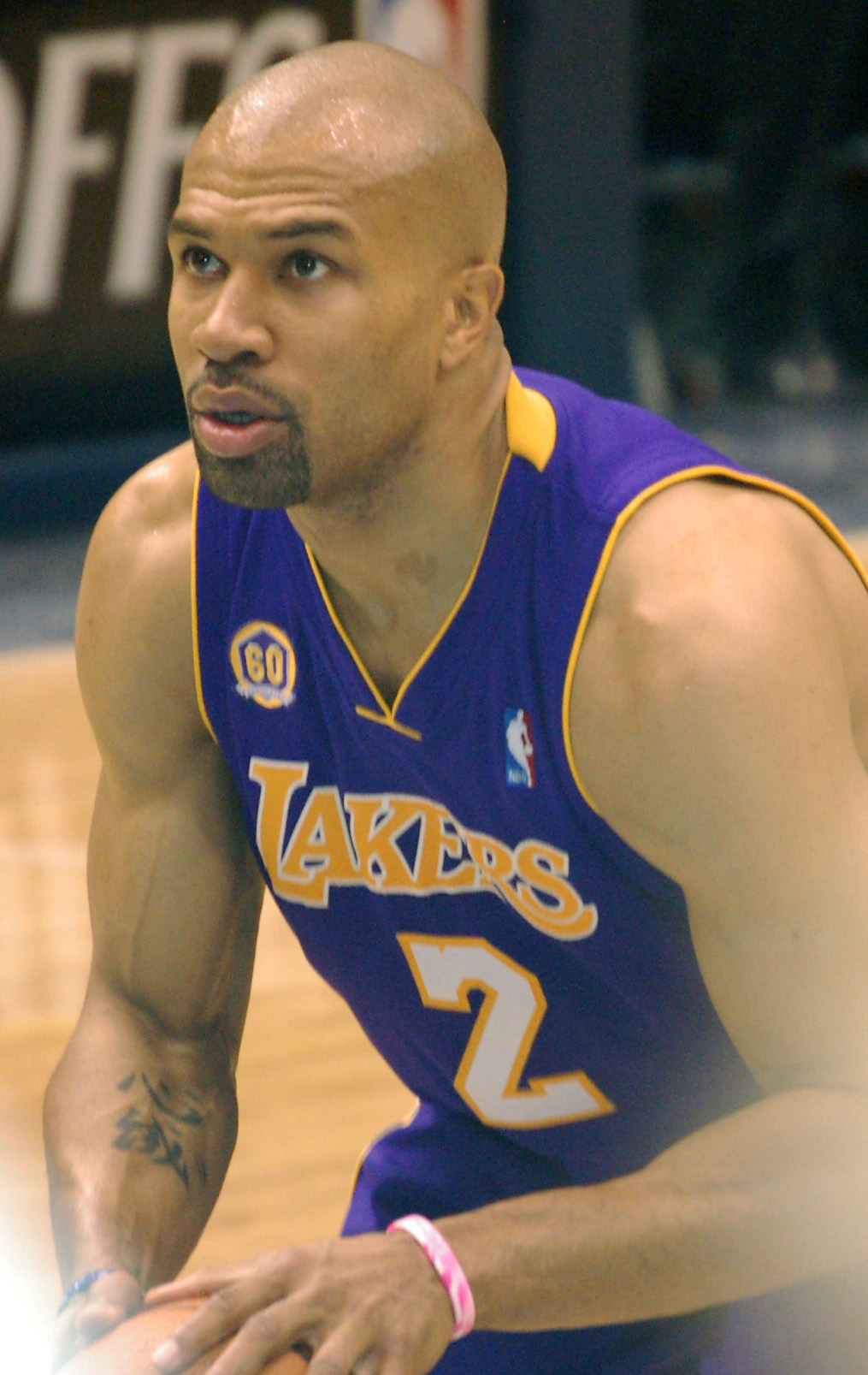
Derek Fisher scored 11 of his 16 points in the fourth quarter to ensure the Lakers a Game 3 win.

Prior to the starting lineups being announced, singer Monica performed the national anthem. Kevin Garnett scored the first six points of the game to give the Celtics a 6–0 lead and eventually helped the team to a seven-point lead (12–5) early in the first quarter. Following the first full timeout of the game, the Lakers scored 13 straight points thanks in part to free throws by Bryant and Gasol. After the score was tied at 16–16, the Lakers outscored the Celtics 10–1 for the remainder of the first quarter.

The Lakers' 32–8 run continued well into the second quarter when Bryant completed a free throw after being fouled by forward Glen "Big Baby" Davis en route to making a layup 43 seconds into the game. Further helping to widen the gap was Shannon Brown who made a 20-foot jumper from a Lamar Odom assist. Odom, Farmar, and Bynum also made shots to widen the score to 17 points above the Celtics. The Celtics would soon create their own comeback with an 11–4 run before the Lakers called for a full timeout. Bryant made jumper on a Gasol assist while Pierce shot another three-pointer on a Rondo assist. The final two minutes of the first half ended in a shootout between the Celtics and Lakers starters resulting in a 52–40 Lakers lead.

The first few minutes of the second half proved to be a slow start for both teams as the Celtics piled 2–8 shooting while the Lakers posted 2–11 shooting before the first full timeout. Gasol made a 20-foot jumper to give the Lakers their first points of the third quarter; Garnett responded by a 20-foot jumper. Shortly after making his third shot from beyond-the-arc, Pierce received his fourth foul sending him to the bench. Odom, who replaced a limping Bynum, also earned two fouls of his own in addition to bad passing. The Celtics soon took advantage of the Lakers problems when Davis, Tony Allen, and Rasheed Wallace managed to successfully hit several critical shots to end the quarter on a six-point deficit.

The Celtics continued their momentum into the fourth quarter eventually pulling to within one point after two minutes. After coming off the bench to replace a struggling Gasol in the fourth quarter, Derek Fisher made a 12-foot jumper in what would be another of his finest postseason performances in his career. He then made four consecutive shots to give the Lakers a 78–73 lead before earning a foul on Ray Allen. With 1:40 left in the game, Bryant made his lone shot of the quarter despite posting 25 points in the first three periods combined. Foul troubles for both Garnett and Pierce hurt the Celtics chances of closing the gap with the Lakers. Pierce made one final layup with five seconds left in the game, but the Lakers edged the Celtics with a 91–84 victory to take a 2–1 lead in the series. Bryant was the leading scorer of the game with 29 points; Garnett's 25 points bested all other Celtics players for Game 3. Derek Fisher scored 11 of his 16 points in the fourth quarter. Compared to his record eight three-point field goals in Game 2, Ray Allen went a near-record 0–13 in field goals for this game.

=== Game 4 ===
ABC

June 10
9:00 p.m.

Recap
Video highlights on YouTube

Los Angeles Lakers 89, Boston Celtics 96
Scoring by quarter: 16–19, 29–23, 17–18, 27–36
Pts: Kobe Bryant 33; Rebs: Artest, Odom 7 each Asts: Artest, Gasol 3 each	Pts: Paul Pierce 19; Rebs: Kendrick Perkins 7 Asts: Paul Pierce 5
Series tied, 2–2

TD Garden, Boston, Massachusetts
Attendance: 18,624
Referees:
- No. 48 Scott Foster
- No. 32 Eddie F. Rush
- No. 57 Greg Willard

After the first quarter, the Celtics held a 19–16 lead; Paul Pierce scored eight points in the quarter for the Celtics, while Gasol had eight points for the Lakers. The Lakers rebounded to take a three-point lead entering halftime. The Lakers maintained a two-point lead following the third quarter, in which Bryant made three three-point baskets. Early in the fourth quarter, the Celtics went on a run that gave them control of the game; with a lineup that featured four reserves, the Celtics outscored the Lakers 13–2 over nearly half the quarter. The Celtics held an 11-point lead with 3:57 remaining, but the Lakers mounted a late comeback bid behind Bryant, who posted 10 of the final 12 points for the Lakers. Three free throws with 1:08 remaining pulled the Lakers within 92–86, and they had an opportunity to get closer in the final minute; however, a Bryant pass was stolen by Rondo, who subsequently made a layup to extend the Celtics' lead. Pierce led the Celtics with 19 points in the game. The Celtics benefitted from strong bench play, as their reserves doubled the scoring of the Lakers' backups. Davis scored 18 points (nine in the fourth quarter) and Nate Robinson added 12. For the Lakers, Bryant and Gasol, with 33 and 21 points respectively, accounted for most of the team's scoring. Andrew Bynum was unable to play in the second half because of a knee injury.

=== Game 5 ===
ABC

June 13
8:00 p.m.

Recap
Video highlights on YouTube

Los Angeles Lakers 86, Boston Celtics 92
Scoring by quarter: 20–22, 19–23, 26–28, 21–19
Pts: Kobe Bryant 38; Rebs: Pau Gasol 12; Asts: Kobe Bryant 4	Pts: Paul Pierce 27; Rebs: Kevin Garnett 10; Asts: Rajon Rondo 8
Boston leads series, 3–2

TD Garden, Boston, Massachusetts
Attendance: 18,624
Referees:
- No. 17 Joey Crawford
- No. 24 Mike Callahan
- No. 9 Derrick Stafford

The Celtics started the game with a 6–0 run, and ended the first quarter leading by 2 on a strong performance by Paul Pierce. After a short Lakers run, the Celtics pushed the lead to 6 by the end of the half, with Pierce shooting 7–10, scoring 15 points, despite the Celtics only getting to the free-throw line six times. Pierce's three-pointer pushed the Celtics' lead to double digits, 50–39, early in the third quarter, but the Lakers chipped away at that lead to bring it down to 8, as the Celtics went into the fourth quarter attempting to maintain a 73–65 advantage. With the Celtics leading by 12 with less than three minutes to play, seven straight free throws by the Lakers cut the lead to 87–82 with a little over 40 seconds in the game. On an inbounds play, Garnett lobbed the ball to Pierce, who, while falling out of bounds, hurled it toward a streaking Rondo, who laid it up and in, essentially solidifying the Celtics' win of the game with a 7-point lead with 35 seconds to play. Garnett chipped in with 18 points and 10 rebounds. Rondo played well, shooting 9–12 from the floor for 18 points, 8 assists and 5 rebounds. The game featured a 38-point performance by Bryant (hitting numerous shots in the 3rd quarter), being the only Lakers player to score over 12 points and one of only two in double figures. Pierce, on the other hand, would dominate the game with 27 points on 57% shooting from the floor. This was the Celtics' last win in the NBA Finals until Game 1 of the 2022 NBA Finals.

=== Game 6 ===
ABC

June 15
9:00 p.m. (6:00 p.m. PDT)

Recap
Video highlights on YouTube

Boston Celtics 67, Los Angeles Lakers 89
Scoring by quarter: 18–28, 13–23, 20–25, 16–13
Pts: Ray Allen 19; Rebs: Glen Davis 9 Asts: Rajon Rondo 6	Pts: Kobe Bryant 26; Rebs: Pau Gasol 13; Asts: Pau Gasol 9
Series tied, 3–3

Staples Center, Los Angeles, California
Attendance: 18,997
Referees:
- No. 13 Monty McCutchen
- No. 14 Joe DeRosa
- No. 41 Ken Mauer

The Lakers returned to Los Angeles with a 3–2 deficit in the series. This was an elimination game for them, and the Celtics were one game away from the championship. The Celtics starting center Kendrick Perkins suffered a serious knee injury in the first quarter, rendering the Celtics more vulnerable on defense and rebounding. The desperate Lakers opened up a massive lead, peaking at 27. The Lakers' bench had outscored the Celtics' bench 24–0 entering the fourth quarter.

It was later revealed that Perkins tore both his PCL and MCL, and he was ruled out for Game 7. His Lakers counterpart, Andrew Bynum left the game early in the third quarter due to swelling in his knee from a torn meniscus. He, however, was not ruled out for Game 7.

=== Game 7 ===
ABC

June 17
9:00 p.m. (6:00 p.m. PDT)

Recap
Video highlights on YouTube

Boston Celtics 79, Los Angeles Lakers 83
Scoring by quarter: 23–14, 17–20, 17–19, 22–30
Pts: Paul Pierce 18; Rebs: Paul Pierce 10; Asts: Rajon Rondo 10	Pts: Kobe Bryant 23; Rebs: Pau Gasol 18; Asts: Pau Gasol 4
L.A. Lakers win NBA Finals, 4–3

Staples Center, Los Angeles, California
Attendance: 18,997
Referees:
- No. 17 Joey Crawford
- No. 43 Dan Crawford
- No. 48 Scott Foster

External videos
- Full game broadcast by ABC on YouTube

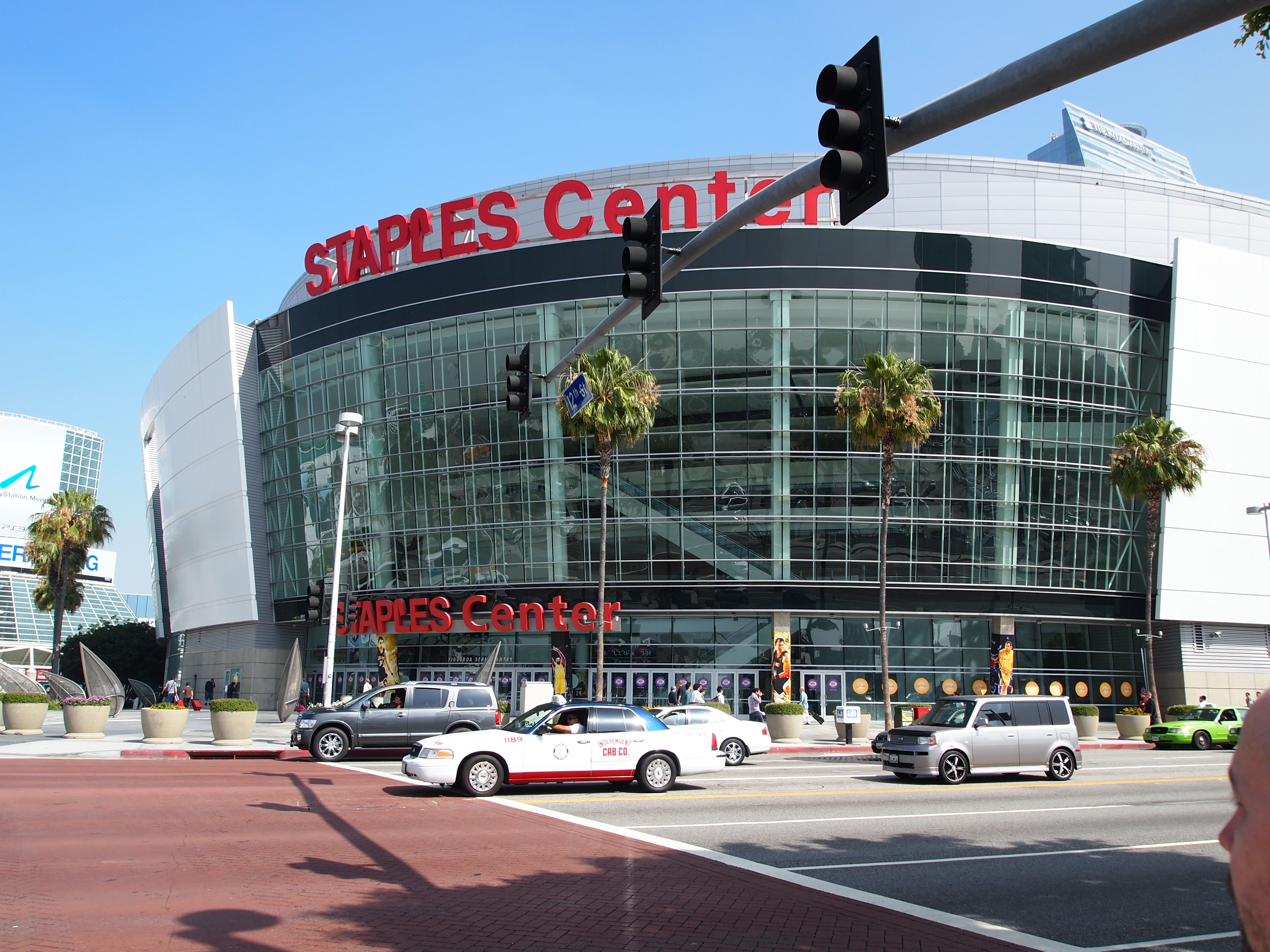
Exterior view of the Staples Center (now Crypto.com Arena) ahead of Game 7 of the 2010 NBA Finals.

This game was the first Game 7 in an NBA Finals since 2005 five years earlier, as well as head coach Phil Jackson’s first-ever Finals Game 7. Both the Celtics and Lakers kept the game close early in the first quarter with each team holding a one-point lead. Suddenly, the Lakers offense began to falter with starters missing field goals and easy layups. The Celtics utilized their opponents struggles to widen their lead. After the team's first full timeout, the Celtics managed to outscore the Lakers 6–1, with Davis scoring four points on questionable calls. The Celtics held the Lakers to only 14 points and took a 23–14 lead ending the first quarter.

At the start of the second quarter, the Lakers got back in the game by scoring 11 straight points to take a two-point lead over the Celtics. The lead proved to be brief, however, as Rajon Rondo and Kevin Garnett scored two-pointers to regain control of the game. Nevertheless, the Lakers continued to score points, with Ron Artest hitting 3 of his 4 free throws in the quarter to maintain a four-point deficit. Before the second quarter concluded, Paul Pierce sunk a pair of free throws to end the first half with a 40–34 Celtics lead.

The Celtics opened the second half going on a 9–2 run which widened their lead over the Lakers by as much as 13 points, 49–36. The turning point for the Lakers however arrived after the team took a twenty-second timeout. Bryant made a running jumper on a Lamar Odom assist in what would turn out to be a 6–2 run by the Lakers cutting their deficit to six points behind the Celtics. Pierce then scored a three-pointer to restore the lead to nine. As the third quarter drew to a close, the Lakers continued their momentum as Bryant completed a 4-foot jumper while Gasol hit two free throws. Lakers reserve Lamar Odom made a tip shot to make the score 57–53 at the end of the quarter.

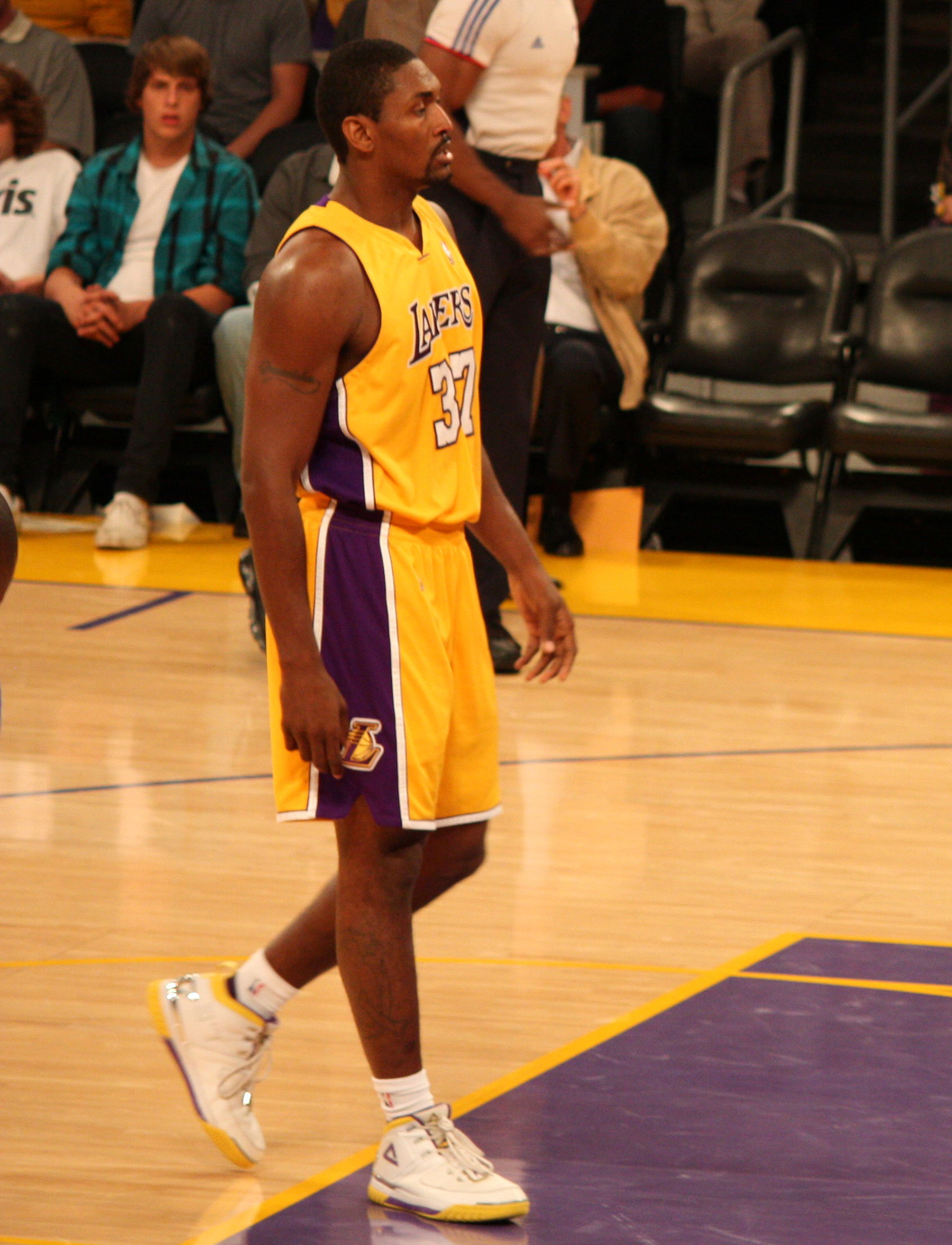
Lakers forward Ron Artest (now Metta Sandiford-Artest) made a critical three-point field goal late in the fourth quarter to give the Lakers a six-point lead.

The Lakers' fortunes rode high midway through the fourth quarter as Fisher sunk a three-point field goal from 26-feet to tie the game at 64. Despite having a poor night offensively, Bryant hit two free throws and followed through with a 17-foot shot to give the Lakers a 68–64 lead, the team's first lead since early in the second quarter. Gasol hit two more free throws on a Garnett foul to extend that margin to six. The Celtics would not give up, however, as with the Lakers leading by 6 with a minute-and-a-half remaining, Wallace hit a three-pointer to cut the Lakers' lead to 76–73. Although Artest exhibited shooting difficulties throughout the game, he answered in spectacular fashion by sinking a three-point goal to restore his team's lead back to six with a minute remaining in the game. It would prove to be the lethal blow for the Celtics. In the fourth quarter, four Celtics' players (Garnett, Davis, Pierce, and Wallace) earned four or more personal fouls. Wallace would later depart from the game after fouling out. After Artest's three, Allen would respond with a three-pointer of his own to cut the Lakers' lead to three again. In the ensuing play, Bryant attempted a three, but the three missed. However, Gasol was there to get the crucial offensive rebound. Gasol then passed the ball to Bryant, who was then fouled by Wallace, fouling him out. Bryant attained two more free throws on Wallace's foul to extend the lead to five, 81–76. After a Celtics' timeout, Allen attempted a three-pointer but he missed it. Rondo grabbed the offensive rebound and hit a three-pointer to bring the Celtics within two, 81–79. However, the Celtics were forced to foul Sasha Vujačić, consequently enabling the Laker's guard to complete two free throws and help his team take a four-point lead, 83–79, over the Celtics. With 11.7 seconds left in the game, Rondo made one last-ditch effort to revive the Celtics' hopes by attempting a three-pointer. The ball missed the basket enabling Gasol to make a defensive rebound. Gasol passed the ball to Odom who quickly threw it to the opposite end of the court in the hands of Bryant as the buzzer sounded.

Bryant, despite shooting 6 for 24 (25%) from the field, scored 10 of his game-high 23 points in the fourth quarter. He was named the Finals MVP for the second straight season. Pierce led the Celtics with 18 points and ten rebounds, but he shot 5–15 (33.3%) from the field. The Lakers had 23 offensive rebounds and out-rebounded the Celtics, 53–40. Gasol had 18 rebounds and Bryant added 15. The Lakers shot 37 free throws to the Celtic's 17. After the game, the Lakers head coach Phil Jackson hailed Artest, who scored 20 points in Game 7 including his last-second three-pointer, as the "most valuable player" of the game.

== Statistics ==
Category	High				Average			
Category	Los Angeles Lakers		Boston Celtics		Los Angeles Lakers		Boston Celtics	
Category	Player	Total	Player	Total	Player	Avg.	Player	Avg.
Points	Kobe Bryant	38	Ray Allen	32	Kobe Bryant	28.6	Paul Pierce	18.0
Rebounds	Pau Gasol	18	Rajon Rondo	12	Pau Gasol	11.6	Rajon Rondo	6.3
Assists	Pau Gasol	9	Rajon Rondo	10	Kobe Bryant	3.9	Rajon Rondo	7.6
Steals	Ron Artest	5	Kevin Garnett	5	Kobe Bryant	2.1	Rajon Rondo	1.6
Blocks	Andrew Bynum	7	Kevin Garnett	4	Pau Gasol	2.6	Kevin Garnett	1.3

== Rosters ==
=== Los Angeles Lakers ===
2009–10 Los Angeles Lakers roster
Players

Pos.	No.	Player	Height	Weight	DOB	From
F	37	Ron Artest	6 ft 7 in (2.01 m)	260 lb (118 kg)		St. John's
G	12	Shannon Brown	6 ft 4 in (1.93 m)	210 lb (95 kg)		Michigan State
G/F	24	Kobe Bryant	6 ft 6 in (1.98 m)	205 lb (93 kg)		Lower Merion HS (PA)
C	17	Andrew Bynum	7 ft 0 in (2.13 m)	285 lb (129 kg)		St. Joseph HS (NJ)
G	1	Jordan Farmar	6 ft 2 in (1.88 m)	180 lb (82 kg)		UCLA
G	2	Derek Fisher	6 ft 1 in (1.85 m)	210 lb (95 kg)		Little Rock
F/C	16	Pau Gasol	7 ft 0 in (2.13 m)	250 lb (113 kg)		Spain
C	28	Didier Ilunga-Mbenga	7 ft 0 in (2.13 m)	255 lb (116 kg)		Belgium
F	6	Adam Morrison	6 ft 8 in (2.03 m)	205 lb (93 kg)		Gonzaga
F	7	Lamar Odom	6 ft 10 in (2.08 m)	230 lb (104 kg)		Rhode Island
F/C	21	Josh Powell	6 ft 9 in (2.06 m)	240 lb (109 kg)		NC State
G	18	Sasha Vujačić	6 ft 7 in (2.01 m)	205 lb (93 kg)		Slovenia
F	4	Luke Walton	6 ft 8 in (2.03 m)	235 lb (107 kg)		Arizona

Coaches
Head coach
- (United States) Phil Jackson (North Dakota)
Assistant(s)
- (United States) Frank Hamblen (Syracuse)
- (United States) Brian Shaw (UC Santa Barbara)
- (United States) Kareem Abdul-Jabbar (UCLA)
- (United States) Craig Hodges (Long Beach State)
- (United States) Jim Cleamons (Ohio State)

Legend
- (DP) Unsigned draft pick
- (FA) Free agent
- (S) Suspended
- Injured

Roster
Updated: October 26, 2009

=== Boston Celtics ===
2009–10 Boston Celtics roster
Players

Pos.	No.	Player	Height	Weight	DOB	From
G	20	Ray Allen	6 ft 5 in (1.96 m)	205 lb (93 kg)		Connecticut
G/F	42	Tony Allen	6 ft 4 in (1.93 m)	213 lb (97 kg)		Oklahoma State
G/F	7	Marquis Daniels	6 ft 6 in (1.98 m)	200 lb (91 kg)		Auburn
F/C	11	Glen Davis	6 ft 9 in (2.06 m)	289 lb (131 kg)		LSU
G/F	40	Michael Finley	6 ft 7 in (2.01 m)	225 lb (102 kg)		Wisconsin
F	27	Tony Gaffney	6 ft 8 in (2.03 m)	205 lb (93 kg)		UMass
F/C	5	Kevin Garnett	6 ft 11 in (2.11 m)	253 lb (115 kg)		Farragut Academy (IL)
G	0	Oliver Lafayette	6 ft 2 in (1.88 m)	190 lb (86 kg)		Houston
C	43	Kendrick Perkins	6 ft 10 in (2.08 m)	280 lb (127 kg)		Clifton J. Ozen HS (TX)
G/F	34	Paul Pierce	6 ft 7 in (2.01 m)	235 lb (107 kg)		Kansas
G	4	Nate Robinson	5 ft 9 in (1.75 m)	180 lb (82 kg)		Washington
G	9	Rajon Rondo	6 ft 1 in (1.85 m)	171 lb (78 kg)		Kentucky
F	44	Brian Scalabrine	6 ft 9 in (2.06 m)	235 lb (107 kg)		USC
F/C	30	Rasheed Wallace	6 ft 11 in (2.11 m)	230 lb (104 kg)		North Carolina
F/C	13	Shelden Williams	6 ft 9 in (2.06 m)	250 lb (113 kg)		Duke

Coaches
Head coach
- (United States) Doc Rivers (Marquette)
Assistant(s)
- (United States) Armond Hill (Princeton)
- (United States) Kevin Eastman (Richmond)
- (United States) Clifford Ray (Oklahoma)
- (United States) Tom Thibodeau (Salem State)
- (United States) Mike Longabardi (Frostburg State)

Legend
- (DP) Unsigned draft pick
- (FA) Free agent
- (S) Suspended
- Injured

Roster
Updated: April 14, 2010

== Player statistics ==
Legend
GP	Games played	GS	Games started	MPG	Minutes per game
FG%	Field-goal percentage	3P%	3-point field-goal percentage	FT%	Free-throw percentage
RPG	Rebounds per game	APG	Assists per game	SPG	Steals per game
BPG	Blocks per game	PPG	Points per game

Los Angeles Lakers

Los Angeles Lakers statistics
Player	GP	GS	MPG	FG%	3P%	FT%	RPG	APG	SPG	BPG	PPG
Ron Artest	7	7	35.9	.361	.344	.550	4.6	1.3	1.4	0.6	10.6
Shannon Brown	7	0	12.1	.450	.000	1.000	0.9	0.4	0.0	0.1	3.0
Kobe Bryant	7	7	41.2	.405	.319	.883	8.0	3.9	2.1	0.7	28.6
Andrew Bynum	7	7	24.9	.452	.000	.700	5.1	0.0	0.1	1.3	7.4
Jordan Farmar	7	0	12.6	.321	.200	.500	1.1	0.9	1.1	0.0	3.0
Derek Fisher	7	7	30.6	.420	.200	.941	3.0	2.0	0.9	0.0	8.6
Pau Gasol	7	7	41.9	.478	.000	.721	11.6	3.7	0.7	2.6	18.6
D. J. Mbenga	1	0	2.7	.000	.000	.000	1.0	0.0	0.0	0.0	0.0
Lamar Odom	7	0	27.4	.489	.100	.545	6.6	1.3	0.6	0.6	7.6
Josh Powell	2	0	4.1	.000	.000	.000	0.5	0.0	0.0	0.0	0.0
Sasha Vujačić	7	0	7.4	.375	.400	.833	1.0	0.7	0.3	0.0	3.0
Luke Walton	4	0	7.8	.333	.000	.000	0.5	0.8	0.0	0.5	0.5

Boston Celtics

Boston Celtics statistics
Player	GP	GS	MPG	FG%	3P%	FT%	RPG	APG	SPG	BPG	PPG
Ray Allen	7	7	39.4	.367	.293	.960	2.7	1.7	0.7	0.0	14.6
Tony Allen	7	0	14.7	.333	.000	.857	1.0	0.4	1.0	0.7	3.1
Marquis Daniels	2	0	2.2	.500	1.000	1.000	0.5	0.0	0.0	0.0	2.5
Glen Davis	7	0	20.6	.462	.000	.688	5.6	0.4	0.9	0.4	6.7
Michael Finley	2	0	2.6	.000	.000	.000	0.0	0.0	0.0	0.0	0.0
Kevin Garnett	7	7	31.7	.511	.000	.895	5.6	3.0	1.4	1.3	15.3
Kendrick Perkins	6	6	23.5	.571	.000	.647	5.8	1.0	0.2	0.0	5.8
Paul Pierce	7	7	39.8	.439	.400	.865	5.3	3.0	0.7	0.9	18.0
Nate Robinson	7	0	10.1	.400	.333	1.000	1.1	1.9	0.1	0.0	4.9
Rajon Rondo	7	7	38.8	.454	.333	.263	6.3	7.6	1.6	0.3	13.6
Brian Scalabrine	1	0	0.9	.000	.000	.000	0.0	0.0	0.0	0.0	0.0
Rasheed Wallace	7	1	20.6	.366	.238	1.000	4.6	0.9	0.4	0.7	5.3
Shelden Williams	2	0	9.2	.000	.000	.000	2.0	0.0	0.0	0.0	0.0

== Broadcasting ==
For the eighth consecutive year in the United States, ABC televised the Finals. Mike Breen, Mark Jackson and Jeff Van Gundy provided commentary for the games. The Finals was also broadcast on ESPN Radio, with Jim Durham, Hubie Brown and Jack Ramsay calling the action. Game 1 was watched by 14.1 million viewers, the most watched Finals opening game since 2004. The viewership for the opening game resulted in a ratings percentage of 8.6% of households in the United States. Game 7 had the highest average number of viewers with 28.2 million, since 1998 when 35.9 million watched the Chicago Bulls defeat the Utah Jazz in Game 6 of that year's Finals. The average number of viewers of 18.1 million, was the highest since 2001. Local TV affiliates of the competing franchises were Los Angeles' KABC-TV and Boston's WCVB-TV. The flagship radio stations of the respective teams broadcast all Series games with their local announcers. In Los Angeles, KSPN carried the Lakers' English-language broadcasts, with Spero Dedes and Mychal Thompson announcing, while KWKW aired the team's Spanish broadcasts. In Boston, WEEI carried the Celtics' English broadcasts with Sean Grande and Cedric Maxwell announcing.

Game	Ratings (households)	Share (households)	American audience (in millions)
1	8.6	14	14.1
2	9.2	15	15.5
3	9.6	16	16.0
4	9.9	18	16.4
5	10.8	18	18.2
6	10.4	18	18.0
7	15.6	27	28.2

== Impact and aftermath ==
Lakers head coach Phil Jackson earned his 11th NBA championship title, further extending his record for most championships earned by either an NBA coach or any coach and general manager in a major North American professional sports league. It was also his 13th NBA championship title, as he had won two as a player with the Knicks in 1970 and 1973. Bryant won his second consecutive NBA Finals MVP Award. He later said that this championship win was the "sweetest" because it was against the longtime, storied rivals and was the toughest series by far. Furthermore, the Lakers forward Luke Walton and his father Hall of Famer Bill Walton became the only (as of 2011) father and son to both have won multiple NBA championships Bill in 1977 and 1986 and Luke in 2009 and 2010. Lastly, this would become Bryant's final championship, and, as of the 2023–24 NBA season, this was also marked the most recent NBA Finals meeting between the Lakers and the Celtics.

The Boston–Los Angeles sports rivalry would be rekindled later in the decade, beginning with the LA Galaxy capturing the 2014 MLS Cup over the New England Revolution. In 2018, the Boston Red Sox won Major League Baseball's World Series over the Los Angeles Dodgers, and the New England Patriots defeated the Los Angeles Rams in Super Bowl LIII to capture the National Football League's championship. While neither the Boston Bruins nor the Los Angeles Kings have faced off in the National Hockey League's Stanley Cup Final, they have both won the Stanley Cup during the decade, with the Bruins winning theirs in 2011, and the Kings in 2012 and 2014.

=== Lakers ===
Derek Fisher during the victory parade.

The series win brought the Lakers' franchise NBA championship total to 16, at the time, second only to the Celtics' 17 championships, at the time. This also marked the 11th title for the team since moving from Minneapolis in 1960, and it was the franchise's fifth Finals win in eleven seasons. This was the Lakers' first Game 7 win over the Celtics in Finals history, the Celtics had won all previous matchups in Game 7s. Moreover, the Lakers were now 3–9 against the Celtics since the two teams first competed against each other in the 1959 NBA Finals.

On June 21, a victory parade took place for the Lakers. Unlike like previous years, however, there was no pep rally that followed after the end of the parade due to both security and financial reasons. The team was transported around on an open-air float equipped with loudspeakers enabling the players to talk to the spectators. The parade began at 11 a.m local time at Staples Center, turned east on Chick Heart Court, turned south onto Figueroa Street, then east onto Jefferson Boulevard before entering beneath Interstate 110. The parade concluded at the intersection of Jefferson Boulevard and Grand Avenue near the University of Southern California's Galen Center. Occasionally, Ron Artest led the crowd in chanting "Boston sucks!" Over 65,000 people were estimated to have attended the parade. Most of the 2009–10 Lakers team were on hand to receive their championship rings before the start of the season opener against the Houston Rockets on October 26. They also visited U.S. president Barack Obama at the THEARC Boys and Girls Club in Washington, DC. in December 2010, presenting him with a banner declaring the Lakers as 2009–10 NBA World Champions.

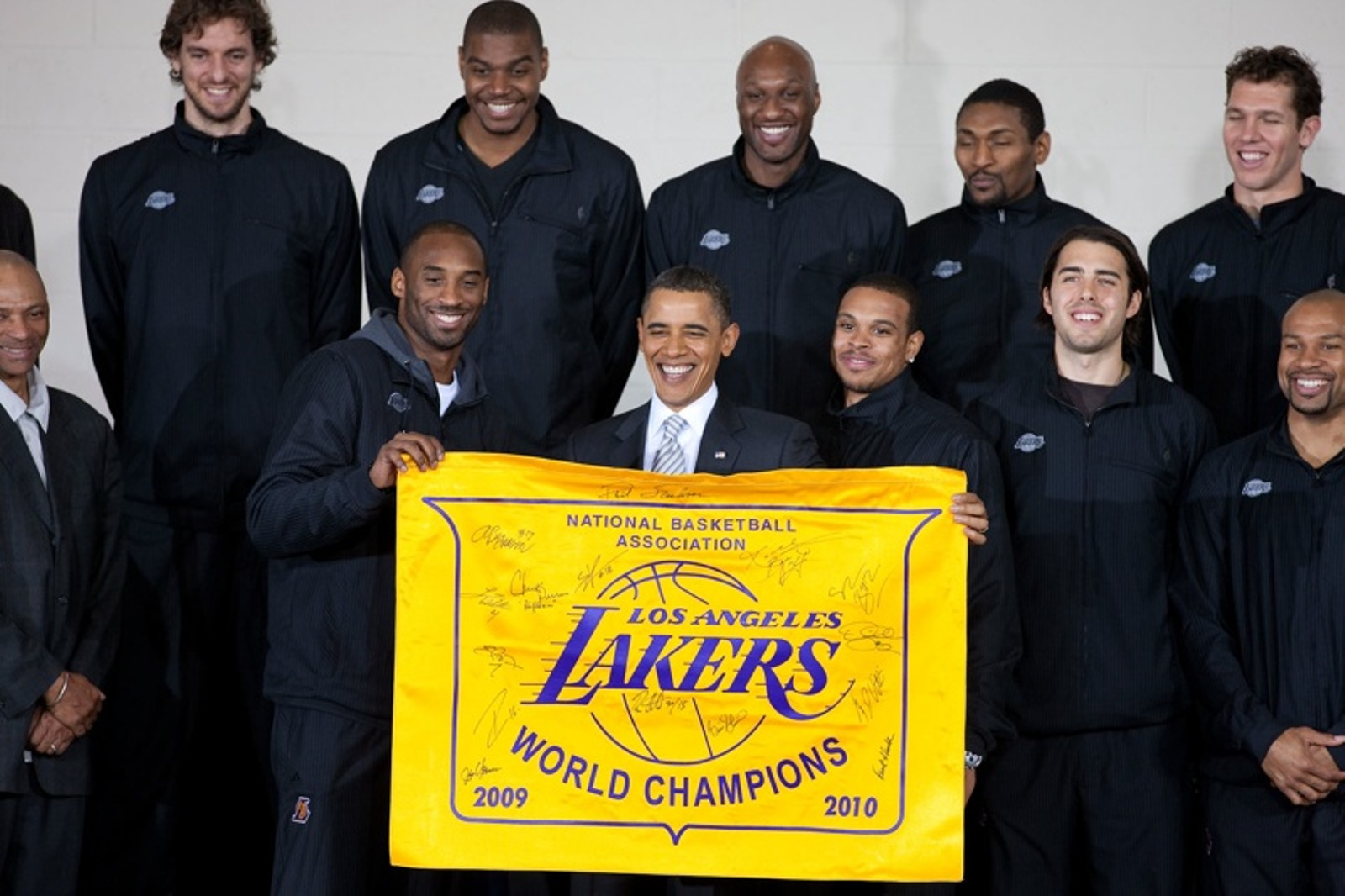
President Barack Obama meets with the 2010 NBA champion Lakers at the THEARC Boys and Girls Club in Washington, D.C.

In November 2010, Time Capsule Press published a book entitled Journey to the Ring: Behind the Scenes with the 2010 NBA Champions Lakers. The book, written by coach Phil Jackson, featured various photographs from sports photographer Andrew D. Bernstein chronicling the Lakers 2009–10 season en route to their triumph against the Celtics. Throughout the early 2010s, the Lakers maintained their tradition of success during the regular season; however, the team would stagnate when they experienced a prolonged absence from the playoffs for several years after the 2012-13 season. In 2014, coach Jackson, by then the President of Basketball Operations for the New York Knicks, hired Derek Fisher to become the team's coach. On Fisher's staff was many of Jackson's longtime assistants, such as Kurt Rambis, Jim Cleamons, and Rasheed Hazzard.

The Lakers would not return to the Finals until 2020, with the LeBron James and Anthony Davis-led team (former Celtics point guard Rajon Rondo would also be on the team) defeating the Miami Heat and winning their 17th title, which tied the Celtics for the most in league history, at the time. The championship was a tribute to Kobe Bryant, who died in a tragic helicopter accident, along with 8 others including Bryant's daughter Gianna Bryant, in January of that year. The tie with the Celtics lasted until 2024, when the Celtics defeated the Dallas Mavericks in 5 games to win their 18th championship.

=== Celtics ===
During a private meeting in 2007 between head coach Doc Rivers, Paul Pierce, and the newly acquired Ray Allen and Kevin Garnett, Garnett asked Rivers how many titles he thought the core could win together. Instead of answering the question, Rivers stated the core had five years together before it would go downhill.

Rivers prediction proved to be correct, as the fifth year of the Big Three was 2012, which ended up being their last year they made a deep postseason run together. By this time, Ray Allen was 36, Kevin Garrett was 35, and Paul Pierce was 34. The regular season started on Christmas 2011 and was reduced from its usual 82 games to 66 due to the lockout, which hurt the older Celtics teams due to the number of games played in a smaller duration. They finished fourth in the Eastern Conference, where they defeated the Atlanta Hawks in six games in the First Round, and the Philadelphia 76ers in seven games in the Semifinals. In the Eastern Conference Finals, they faced the Miami Heat for the third consecutive season (the team who defeated them in last season's Semifinals). In addition, LeBron James faced the Celtics for the third straight year in the playoffs. The LeBron-led Cavs also faced the Celtics in 2010 only to be defeated 4–2, which ultimately led to James' arrival on the Heat that summer. Their 2012 series was hard-fought and the Celtics eventually took advantage going up 3–2 heading back to TD Garden. The Heat prevented a celebration from happening in Game 6 with a 98–79 blowout win to send the series back to Miami for a seventh and deciding game. James had one of his best playoff games, scoring 45 points and getting 15 rebounds, 30 of his 45 came in the first half alone. In Game 7, the Celtics started strong and had a 7-point lead going into halftime, but the Heat carved into the lead in the third quarter and eventually took control, winning the game 101–88, and advancing to the NBA Finals.

Allen departed for the Miami Heat in 2012, where he would win his second and final NBA championship title with them in the 2013 NBA Finals, while Pierce and Garnett were traded to the Brooklyn Nets the following offseason. Also in the 2013 offseason, Rivers took over as the Los Angeles Clippers head coach, and the last remaining piece of the “Big Four”, Rondo, was traded to the Dallas Mavericks early into the 2014–15 season. Rondo would later join the Lakers in 2018 and win a championship with them in 2020. The Celtics would not make it back to the Finals until 12 years later in 2022, where they were defeated by the Stephen Curry-led Golden State Warriors in a six-game series. The Celtics would once again make it to the Finals two years later in 2024, this time defeating the Luka Dončić and Kyrie Irving-led Dallas Mavericks in five games, garnering their first championship title in 16 years and 18th overall, effectively consolidating their position as the NBA franchise with the highest number of NBA championship titles.
