= Brian Scalabrine =

American basketball player (born 1978)

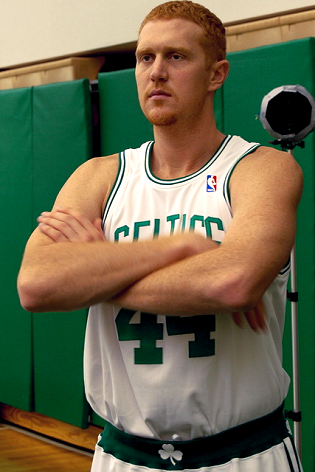
- Scalabrine with the Boston Celtics in 2007

Personal information
- Born: March 18, 1978 (age 48) Long Beach, California, U.S.
- Listed height: 6 ft 9 in (2.06 m)
- Listed weight: 235 lb (107 kg)

Career information
- High school: Enumclaw (Enumclaw, Washington)
- College: Highline CC (1996–1997); USC (1998–2001)
- NBA draft: 2001: 2nd round, 35th overall pick
- Drafted by: New Jersey Nets
- Playing career: 2001–2012
- Position: Power forward
- Number: 21, 44, 24

Career history

Playing
- 2001–2005: New Jersey Nets
- 2005–2010: Boston Celtics
- 2010–2012: Chicago Bulls
- 2011: Benetton Treviso

Coaching
- 2013–2014: Golden State Warriors (assistant)

Career highlights
- NBA champion (2008); First-team All-Pac-10 (2000); Pac-10 Newcomer of the Year (1999)

Career NBA statistics
- Points: 1,594 (3.1 ppg)
- Rebounds: 1,034 (2.0 rpg)
- Assists: 436 (0.8 apg)
- Stats at NBA.com
- Stats at Basketball Reference

Brian David Scalabrine (/ˌskæl.ə.ˈbriː.niː/, SKAL-ə-BREE-nee; born March 18, 1978), nicknamed "White Mamba", is an American former professional basketball player who is currently a television analyst for the Boston Celtics of the National Basketball Association (NBA). He is also a commentator for basketball league Big3 and the co-host of "The Starting Lineup" on SiriusXM NBA Radio.

Raised in Enumclaw, Washington, Scalabrine attended the University of Southern California after transferring from Highline College. As a member of the USC Trojans men's basketball team, Scalabrine was the top scorer and a leader in field goals and rebounds. He played at the center position in college.

The New Jersey Nets selected him in the second round of the 2001 NBA draft. The Nets made consecutive NBA Finals appearances his first two years, and Scalabrine played four seasons with the team. In 2005, he signed with the Boston Celtics and won a championship with the team in 2008. The Celtics also appeared in the 2010 NBA Finals. Scalabrine signed with the Chicago Bulls the following season, and played with them until 2012. Throughout his NBA career, Scalabrine served as a backup power forward. Despite never averaging more than 6.3 points per game, Scalabrine became one of the most popular players in the league.

In 2013, Mark Jackson announced that Scalabrine would join his Golden State Warriors coaching staff. In 2014, Scalabrine took a job as an analyst for Celtics games on local Boston broadcasts.

== Early life and college ==
Born in Long Beach, California, Scalabrine was one of four children in his family and graduated from Enumclaw High School at Enumclaw, Washington in 1996. He is of Italian ancestry. He enrolled at Highline College in 1996, played his first year with its basketball team the Thunderbirds, and redshirted his second year. As a freshman at Highline, Scalabrine averaged 16.3 points, 9.6 rebounds, 2.9 assists and 1.2 steals per game. Scalabrine recorded seventeen double-doubles, and led the team in rebounds, blocks, and free throw percentage (75%). The Thunderbirds went 31–1 in the 1996–97 season and won the state junior college championship. Scalabrine was a Northern Division All-Star in 1997 as well as part of the All-Northwest Athletic Association of Community Colleges Championship Tournament Team.

In 1998, he transferred to the University of Southern California (USC). In his first year with the USC Trojans, he was the only player to start all 28 games. He led the Trojans in scoring (14.6 points), rebounding (6.4), and field goals (53.1%). In scoring, blocked shots, and field goals, he was also the only Pac-10 conference player among the top 10 players in those areas. His best game performance was against American University on December 21, 1998: 26 points, seven rebounds, and two blocks. On February 13, 1999, he scored 22 points including an important three-pointer in overtime; the unranked USC won an upset victory over number-six Stanford 86–82 in overtime. He was the 1999 Pac-10 Newcomer of the Year and earned an All-Pac-10 honorable mention.

During his second season with USC, Scalabrine was named to the All-Pac-10 first team and the National Association of Basketball Coaches All-District 15 first team. He also earned a Sporting News All-American honorable mention. Again, he finished as USC's top scorer (17.8 ppg) and field goal shooter (53.1%) and was also the second-best Pac-10 scorer. He also made 40.3% of attempted three-pointers. Against the Oregon Ducks, Scalabrine scored 29 points and made 10 rebounds.

USC advanced to the NCAA tournament in 2001, Scalabrine's senior season. In the Elite Eight round, USC lost to Duke 79–69; Scalabrine scored 13 points. Scalabrine graduated with a degree in history.

== Professional career ==
=== New Jersey Nets (2001–2005) ===
Because he injured his fifth metatarsal bone during workouts in late September 2001, Scalabrine missed the first ten days of New Jersey Nets training camp. During the second quarter of the final 2001–02 preseason game, which took place against the Detroit Pistons on October 26, 2001, Scalabrine again injured his right foot. He made his NBA debut on January 31, 2002, when the Nets played against the Milwaukee Bucks. As a rookie, Scalabrine averaged 2.1 points, 1.8 rebounds, and 0.8 assists per game. He played in six playoff games his debut season and averaged 0.3 points and 0.5 rebounds. The Nets were the Eastern Conference Champions of the 2001–02 season and lost the 2002 NBA Finals to the Los Angeles Lakers in four games. In a triple-overtime victory over the Detroit Pistons in Game 5 of the 2004 Eastern Conference Semifinal series, Scalabrine scored a career high 17 points. He surpassed that high with 29 points on January 26, 2005, against the Golden State Warriors. On April 15, 2005, he played a career high 45 minutes.

During his time with the Nets, Scalabrine gained the nickname "Veal", a play on words based on the dish veal scaloppine.

=== Boston Celtics (2005–2010) ===
Scalabrine collecting his NBA-championship ring 2008

On August 2, 2005, Scalabrine signed a five-year contract with the Boston Celtics. A month earlier, he and the team agreed on terms that the contract be worth $15 million over the five years.

Scalabrine started in nine of 48 games during the 2007–08 season, and played on average 10.7 minutes. He averaged 1.8 points and 1.6 rebounds per game. On April 16, 2008, in the final game of the regular season, Scalabrine tied a season-high with six rebounds and played 29 minutes. He did not make an appearance in the NBA playoffs. In the 2008 NBA Finals, the Celtics defeated the Lakers in six games.

Scalabrine played two more seasons with the Celtics in 2008-09 and 2009-10.

=== Chicago Bulls (2010–2011) ===
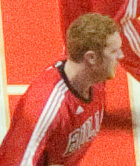
Scalabrine warms up before Game 5 of the 2011 Eastern Conference Finals

On September 21, 2010, Scalabrine agreed to a non-guaranteed contract with the Chicago Bulls. The Bulls visited the Boston Celtics on November 5, 2010, and in double overtime the Bulls won 110–105. Scalabrine played only three minutes that game. He played 18 games with the Bulls and averaged 1.1 points and 0.4 rebounds per game.

=== Treviso (2011) ===
On September 22, 2011, during the 2011 NBA lockout, Scalabrine signed with the Italian team Benetton Treviso. He left the team in December 2011 to pursue opportunities in the NBA after the lockout had ended. In 7 league games, he averaged 11.6 points and 5 rebounds, while shooting .545 from the three point range.

=== Return to Chicago (2011–2012) ===
On December 12, 2011, Scalabrine re-signed with the Bulls. During the 2011–12 season, Scalabrine played in 28 games. In September 2012, he was offered a position as an assistant coach for the Bulls under Tom Thibodeau, but instead opted to become a broadcaster for the Boston Celtics.

=== BIG3 League (2017) ===
In 2017, Brian joined the Ball Hogs of the BIG3 basketball league.

== Coaching career ==
In July 2013, Golden State Warriors coach Mark Jackson announced via Twitter that Scalabrine was joining his coaching staff. During the season, Jackson reassigned Scalabrine to the Warriors' D-League affiliate after a difference of opinion on the team's direction.

== Broadcasting career ==
In September 2012, Scalabrine announced that he had turned down an opportunity to become an assistant coach with the Bulls so that he could join Comcast SportsNet New England as a commentator. Scalabrine described the job as "a trial run", and said there was a "small possibility" he would resume his playing career overseas in 2013.

In 2014, Scalabrine wrote an essay to Boston to announce his "homecoming" to become a Comcast SportsNet announcer. His essay spoofed a famous Sports Illustrated story about LeBron James's return to Cleveland. That same year he became a co-host of "The Starting Lineup" on SiriusXM NBA Radio a role he still holds as of 2026.

In 2014, following his coaching stint with Golden State, Scalabrine took a part time job as an analyst for pre/post-game live during Celtics games on NBC Sports Boston (NBCSB). During the 2015-16 NBA season Scalabrine became the full-time road color analyst for Celtics games on NBCSB alongside Mike Gorman. He would remain in this position until the 2020-21 season when he would then take over as the full time color analyst for both home and road games following Tom Heinsohn’s death in 2020. In June 2021, he signed a multi year contract extension with NBCSB to remain as the lead color analyst. Following Gorman’s retirement at the end of 2023-24 season Scalabrine has since called Celtics games alongside play by play commentator Drew Carter.

In 2025, Scalabrine was added to NBC Sports' national NBA coverage team, contributing as a game analyst for select broadcasts on NBC and Peacock, along with occasional studio appearances.

== Personal life ==
Scalabrine married Kristen Couch in 2003; their wedding ceremony was held in Hawaii. They have two children. He is a member of the sports philanthropy organization Athletes for Hope, and regularly participates in celebrity golf tournaments.

Scalabrine host basketball camps through his organization Team White Mamba.

Scalabrine appeared as himself in an episode of the dark comedy series Kevin Can F**k Himself in 2021.

== Fan support ==
Despite his limited playing time, Scalabrine became a popular player. During his time with the Celtics Scalabrine would draw loud reactions from Celtics fans whenever he would check into a game or touch the ball with them often chanting "Scaaal" or "Scal-a-bree-nee". Bulls fans referred to him as "The White Mamba", a play on Kobe Bryant's nickname of "The Black Mamba".

In 2013, in response to criticism over his bench role throughout his career and to claims that many would beat him one-on-one, Scalabrine stated, "I'm closer to LeBron than you are to me", suggesting that there is a sizeable difference between any (active or retired) NBA player and those outside the league. In an event organized by The Toucher and Rich Show, selected volunteers had the chance to play one-on-one against Scalabrine (until 11 points with a margin of two). The format was called the "Scallenge" and Scalabrine played four games, one against each of the voluntary contenders. Scalabrine won every game with a combined score of 44–6. In an additional game Scalabrine played against the three hosts of the show and won 11–1.

== NBA career statistics ==
Legend
GP	Games played	GS	Games started	MPG	Minutes per game
FG%	Field goal percentage	3P%	3-point field goal percentage	FT%	Free throw percentage
RPG	Rebounds per game	APG	Assists per game	SPG	Steals per game
BPG	Blocks per game	PPG	Points per game	**Bold**	Career high
†	Won an NBA championship

=== Regular season ===
Regular season statistics
Year	Team	GP	GS	MPG	FG%	3P%	FT%	RPG	APG	SPG	BPG	PPG
2001–02	New Jersey	28	0	10.4	.343	.300	.733	1.8	.8	.3	.1	2.1
2002–03	New Jersey	59	7	12.3	.402	.359	.833	2.4	.8	.3	**.3**	3.1
2003–04	New Jersey	69	2	13.4	.394	.244	.829	2.5	.9	.3	.2	3.5
2004–05	New Jersey	54	14	**21.6**	.398	.324	.768	**4.5**	**1.6**	**.6**	**.3**	**6.3**
2005–06	Boston	**71**	1	13.2	.383	.356	.722	1.6	.7	.3	**.3**	2.9
2006–07	Boston	54	**17**	19.0	.403	**.400**	.783	1.9	1.1	.4	**.3**	4.0
2007–08†	Boston	48	9	10.7	.389	.326	.750	1.6	.8	.2	.2	1.8
2008–09	Boston	39	8	12.9	.421	.393	**.889**	1.3	.5	.2	**.3**	3.5
2009–10	Boston	52	3	9.1	.341	.327	.667	.9	.5	.2	.1	1.5
2010–11	Chicago	18	0	4.9	**.526**	.000	.000	.4	.3	.2	.2	1.1
2011–12	Chicago	28	0	4.4	.467	.143	.500	.8	.5	.2	.2	1.1
Career		520	61	13.0	.390	.344	.783	2.0	.8	.3	.2	3.1

=== Playoffs ===
Post-season statistics
Year	Team	GP	GS	MPG	FG%	3P%	FT%	RPG	APG	SPG	BPG	PPG
2002	New Jersey	6	0	2.3	.333	.000	.000	.5	.0	.0	.2	.3
2003	New Jersey	7	0	2.9	.500	.000	.000	.6	.0	.0	.0	.6
2004	New Jersey	9	0	8.1	**.647**	**.833**	.500	1.3	.1	**.3**	.0	3.3
2005	New Jersey	4	**3**	15.3	.182	.250	**1.000**	1.8	.5	**.3**	**.5**	2.3
2009	Boston	**12**	0	**20.5**	.423	.448	**1.000**	**2.2**	**1.0**	.2	.4	**5.1**
2010	Boston	1	0	1.0	.000	.000	.000	.0	.0	.0	.0	.0
Career		39	3	10.6	.437	.463	.786	1.3	.4	.2	.2	2.7
