= Kendrick Perkins =

American basketball player (born 1984)

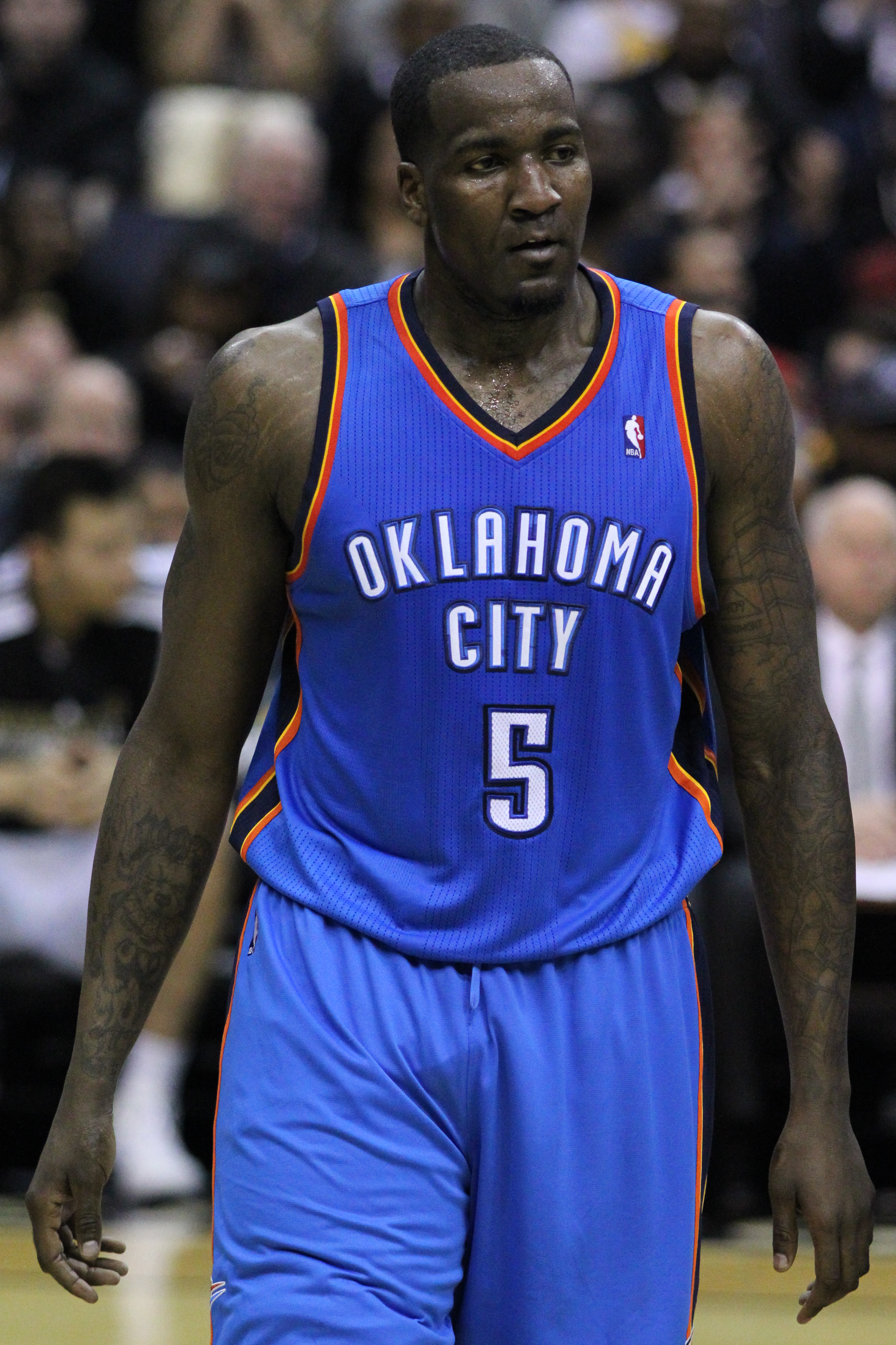
- Perkins with the Oklahoma City Thunder in 2011

Personal information
- Born: November 10, 1984 (age 42) Nederland, Texas, U.S.
- Listed height: 6 ft 10 in (2.08 m)
- Listed weight: 270 lb (122 kg)

Career information
- High school: Clifton J. Ozen High School
- NBA draft: 2003: 1st round, 27th overall pick
- Drafted by: Memphis Grizzlies
- Playing career: 2003–2018
- Position: Center
- Number: 43, 5, 3, 21

Career history
- 2003–2011: Boston Celtics
- 2011–2015: Oklahoma City Thunder
- 2015: Cleveland Cavaliers
- 2015–2016: New Orleans Pelicans
- 2017–2018: Canton Charge
- 2018: Cleveland Cavaliers

Career highlights
- NBA champion (2008); McDonald's All-American (2003); First-team Parade All-American (2003); Second-team Parade All-American (2002); Texas Mr. Basketball (2003)

Career NBA statistics
- Points: 4,214 (5.4 ppg)
- Rebounds: 4,532 (5.8 rpg)
- Blocks: 903 (1.2 bpg)
- Stats at NBA.com
- Stats at Basketball Reference

Kendrick Le’Demetrious Perkins (born November 10, 1984) is an American former professional basketball player who is a sports analyst for ESPN. He played fourteen seasons in the National Basketball Association (NBA).

Hailing from Clifton J. Ozen High School in Beaumont, Texas, Perkins was drafted to the NBA directly out of high school, going 27th overall in the 2003 NBA draft to the Memphis Grizzlies and then having his rights traded to the Boston Celtics. He spent eight seasons in Boston, winning a championship with them in 2008 and reaching another NBA Finals in 2010. He was traded to the Oklahoma City Thunder during the 2010–11 season, where he reached his third NBA Finals in 2012.

Perkins joined the Cleveland Cavaliers during the 2014–15 season, with whom he played in his fourth NBA Finals that year. He later played one season for the New Orleans Pelicans before remaining unsigned during the 2016–17 season. After playing for the Canton Charge of the NBA G League, Perkins returned to the Cavaliers for a second stint in 2018, reaching his fifth NBA Finals that year.

== Early life ==
Perkins was born in Nederland, Texas and raised by his grandparents, who lived on a farm. His mother was shot and killed by her best friend when Kendrick turned five. His father played professional basketball in New Zealand — where he stayed throughout — and never visited Perkins. Perkins went to a private Catholic school starting in sixth grade. Perkins' grandfather was very enthusiastic about sports, helping spark his competitive passion. In addition to basketball, Perkins also participated in pick-up football games as a defensive end, and baseball as a first baseman. Perkins stopped playing baseball in ninth grade, and gave up on football in tenth grade.

Perkins first met LeBron James in the seventh grade when playing for Houston Hoops and competing against LeBron's Ohio Shooting Stars. Perkins later became friends with LeBron during his time at ABCD Camp where they were teammates on the Oakland Soldiers. During his time on the AAU circuit beginning in eighth grade, Perkins was ranked No. 3, LeBron at No. 1, and Chris Paul at No. 2. Perkins had his largest growth spurt from eighth grade to ninth grade, where he went from 6 ft 5 in (1.96 m) to 6 ft 10 in (2.08 m), his current height. Perkins' first in-game dunk was in the seventh grade.

== High school ==
Perkins graduated from Clifton J. Ozen High School in Beaumont, Texas, in 2003. He led Ozen High to four consecutive district championships and one state championship during his high school career. Averaging 27.5 points, 16.4 rebounds and 7.8 blocked shots a game as a senior, he led Ozen to a 33–1 record, with the only loss being a 66–54 setback to Fort Worth Dunbar in the state 4A championship game. After his senior season in 2003, Perkins was selected to the McDonald's All-American Game.

Considered a five-star recruit by Rivals.com, Perkins was listed as the No. 3 center and the No. 6 player in the nation in 2003. He had originally committed to Memphis, but opted instead to make the jump to the NBA straight out of high school.

== Professional career ==
=== Boston Celtics (2003–2011) ===
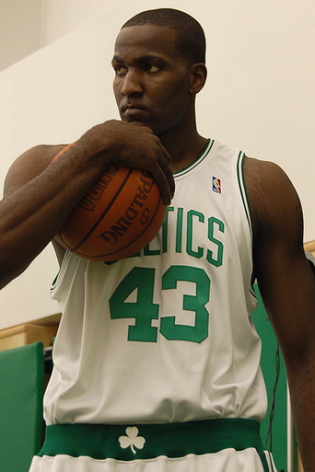
Perkins with the Celtics in 2007

The 6 ft 10 in (2.08 m) center was drafted in the first round with the 27th pick of the 2003 NBA draft by the Memphis Grizzlies, but was immediately traded along with Marcus Banks to the Boston Celtics in exchange for Troy Bell and Dahntay Jones, who had been selected by the Celtics in the same draft.

During the 2004–05 season, Perkins received more playing time than he did his rookie season, and became known as one of the tougher players on the Celtics. He had a limited role during the regular season and playoffs as the team's "enforcer". Perkins was involved in an unusual scenario in the final seconds of regulation in Game 6 of the 2005 Eastern Conference first round against Indiana. Paul Pierce was ejected but Pierce was owed free throws because he had been fouled before the ejection. Under NBA rules, Indiana coach Rick Carlisle chose to select Perkins (who had not played in the game) off the bench to shoot the crucial free throws (the game was tied). Perkins missed both, indirectly leading the game going into overtime, in which the Celtics eventually won.

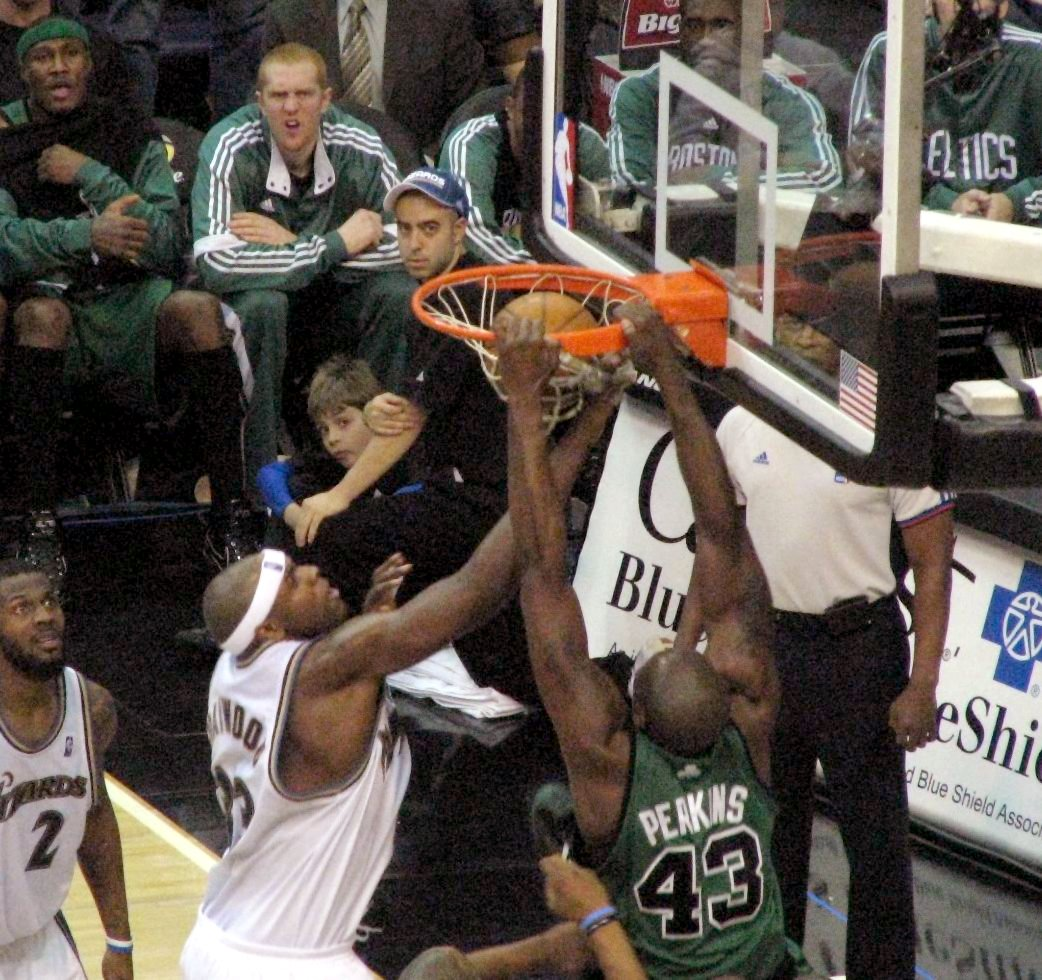
Perkins (right) dunking over Brendan Haywood of the Washington Wizards

After marked improvements during summer training and practice, Perkins earned more playing time from coach Doc Rivers during the 2005–06 season. He played some of the best games of his career in 2006, repeatedly reaching double figures in points and rebounds. After the trade of Mark Blount to the Minnesota Timberwolves, Perkins became the undisputed starting center for the Celtics, although he was already sharing starting time before Blount's departure. He started at center for the 2008 NBA champion Boston Celtics.

In Game 6 of the 2010 NBA Finals, Perkins injured his knee and missed the rest of the game. He was inactive for Game 7, in which the Celtics fell to the Los Angeles Lakers. According to the Los Angeles Times, he suffered torn MCL and PCL ligaments in his right knee.

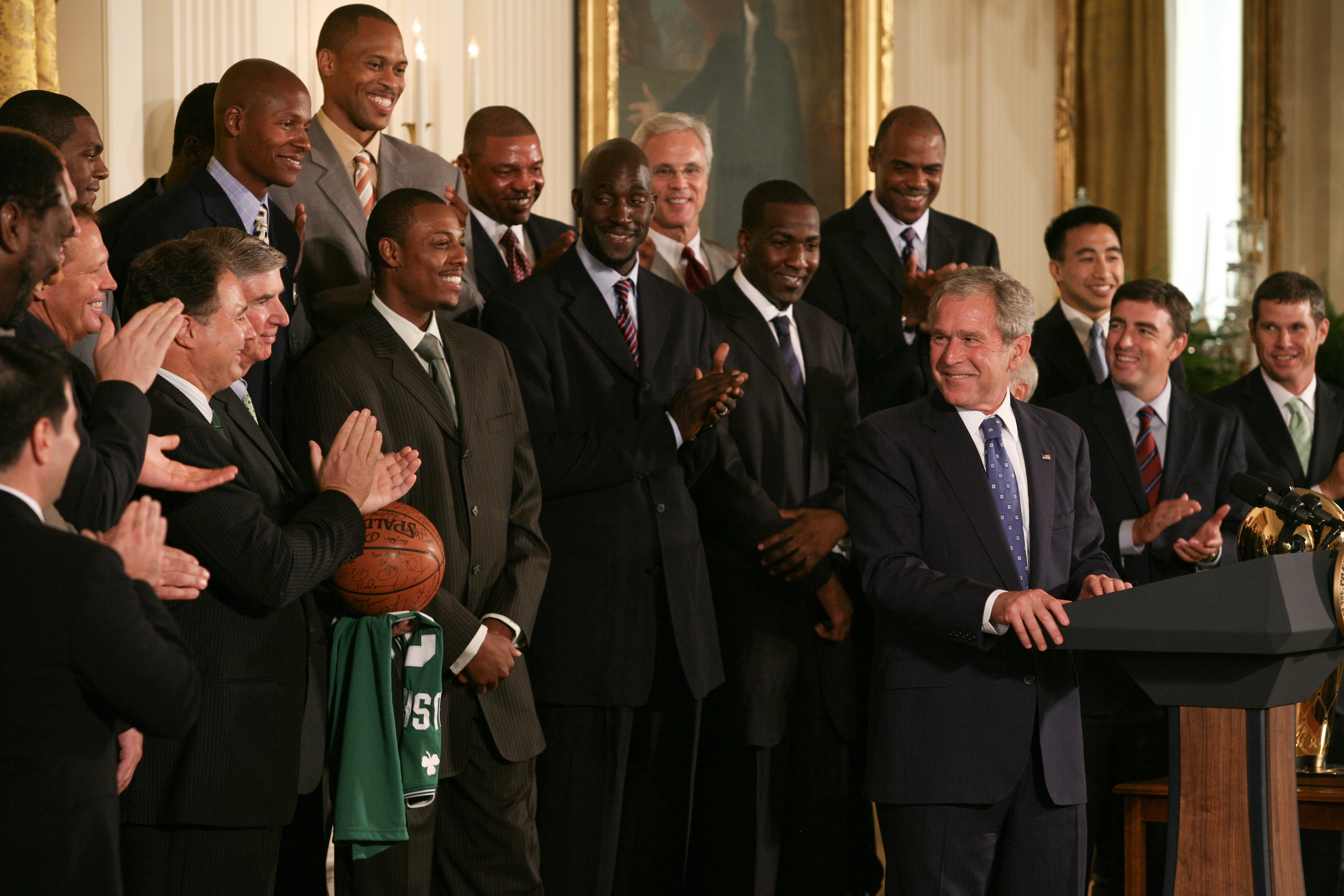
Perkins and the 2008 NBA champion Boston Celtics with President George W. Bush at the White House

Perkins did not return to the floor until January 25, 2011, when he logged 17 minutes off of the bench netting seven points, six rebounds and three assists in a win against the Cleveland Cavaliers. He received a standing ovation upon entering the game in the first quarter. After coming off the bench for his first 5 games back, Perkins returned to the starting line-up Friday, February 4 in a home loss to the Dallas Mavericks. He logged his first double-double of the season with 13 points, 12 rebounds and one blocked shot while shooting 6-for-7 from the field in 33 minutes.

=== Oklahoma City Thunder (2011–2015) ===
==== 2010–11 season ====
On February 24, 2011, Perkins and Nate Robinson were traded to the Oklahoma City Thunder for Jeff Green and Nenad Krstić. On March 1, he signed a multi-year extension with the Thunder. Perkins suffered a left knee sprain injury, which prevented him from debuting with the Thunder until March 14, 2011. On March 14, 2011, Perkins debuted with the Oklahoma City Thunder, recording six points, nine rebounds, and two assists during 20 minutes of play in a 116–89 win against the Washington Wizards. On March 20, 2011, Perkins recorded a season-high four assists, along with five points, 12 rebounds, and a steal, in a 95–93 loss to the Toronto Raptors. On March 25, 2011, Perkins recorded 13 points, five rebounds, three steals, and one block while going 6 for 6 from the field in a 111–103 win over the Minnesota Timberwolves. On March 30, 2011, Perkins scored 13 points again, along with three rebounds, one assist, one steal, and one block in a 116–98 win over the Phoenix Suns. On April 6, 2011, Perkins grabbed a season-high 17 rebounds, while getting five points and one block in a 112–108 win over the Los Angeles Clippers. 10 of his 17 rebounds were offensive boards. According to ESPN, after grabbing 17 rebounds, Perkins said, "We've got goals at hand. When you have bigger goals, you tend to reach smaller goals. I guess that was a good thing to see the guys not comfortable. Our guys want to go a little further than just being division champs."

The Thunder finished the season with 55 wins, clinching the fourth seed in the Western Conference. They went on versus the Denver Nuggets in the First Round of the 2011 NBA playoffs. On April 17, 2011, during Game 1 of the First Round, Perkins got four points, five rebounds, and one block in a 107–103 win against the Denver Nuggets. With just over a minute to go, Perkins scored a bucket to help the Thunder take the lead. This was later figured out as an offensive goaltending call. On April 27, 2011, Perkins got a near double-double, getting 13 points, nine rebounds and one assist during Game 5 of the First Round in a 100–97 win over the Denver Nuggets. On May 7, 2011, during Game 3 of the Western Conference Semifinals, Perkins grabbed 13 rebounds, while also getting six points, one assist, and one steal in a 101–93 overtime loss against the Memphis Grizzlies. He helped the Thunder get to the Western Conference Finals, but the team got eliminated in five games against the Dallas Mavericks. Perkins averaged 4.5 points, 6.1 rebounds and 0.8 blocks per game in the playoffs.

==== 2011–12 season ====
The 2011–12 NBA season was shortened due to the collective bargaining agreement resulting in a lockout. During the 2011 NBA lockout, Perkins lost more than 30 pounds. On December 25, 2011, Perkins started the lockout-shortened season getting six points, four rebounds, one assist, and one block while also going 2 of 2 from the field in a 97–89 win against the Orlando Magic. Perkins made it on the 2012 NBA All-Star ballot, placing 6th out of the centers in the Western Conference. He got 66,380 votes. On February 10, 2012, Perkins got his first double-double of the season, getting 10 points, 10 rebounds, two assists, and one block in a 101–87 win against the Utah Jazz. On February 14, 2012, Perkins tied his career high with six assists, as well as getting seven rebounds, one steal, one block, and one point in a 111–85 win against the Utah Jazz. On February 20, 2012, Perkins got five points, 13 rebounds, three assists, and a season-high six blocks in a 101–93 win against the New Orleans Hornets. On March 5, 2012, Perkins grabbed a season-high 14 rebounds, while also getting seven points, one assist, one steal, and one block in a 95–91 win against the Dallas Mavericks. On March 18, 2012, Perkins got six points, six rebounds, two assists, two blocks, and a career-high tying three steals in a 111–95 win against the Portland Trail Blazers. On March 25, 2012, Perkins scored a season-high 16 points, while also getting six rebounds, two assists, and one steal in a 103–87 win against the Miami Heat. On April 13, 2012, Perkins got his second double-double of the season, getting 11 points and 11 rebounds in a 115–89 win over the Sacramento Kings.

The Thunder finished the season with 47 wins, first in the Northwest Division, and the 2nd seed in the West. To start the 2012 NBA Playoffs, they faced the Dallas Mavericks in the First Round. During Game 2 of the First Round, Perkins scored 13 points, six rebounds, and a block in a 102–99 win against the Mavericks. The team ended up sweeping the Mavericks in four games. They then played the Los Angeles Lakers in the Conference Semifinals. On May 18, 2012, during Game 3 of the Conference Semifinals, Perkins had six points, two rebounds, one assist, one steal, and four blocks in a 99–96 loss against the Lakers. The Thunder ended up defeating the Lakers in five games. They moved on to the Conference Finals where they faced the San Antonio Spurs. On June 2, 2012, during Game 4 of the Conference Finals, Perkins scored 15 points, while getting nine rebounds, one assist, and one block in a 109–103 win against the Spurs. The team defeated the Spurs in six games. Perkins and the Thunder reached the NBA Finals where they played the Big 3–led Miami Heat. On June 17, 2012, during Game 3 of the NBA Finals, Perkins got his first and only double-double of the playoffs, getting 10 points, 12 rebounds, and a block in a 91–85 loss against the Heat. The Thunder couldn't get past the Heat, as they were eliminated in five games. This was Perkins's third trip to the NBA Finals. The other two trips were with the Boston Celtics back in 2008 and 2010. Perkins averaged 4.7 points, 6.2 rebounds, and 1.3 blocks per game in the playoffs.

==== 2012–13 season ====
Perkins began the 2012–13 NBA season getting two points, six rebounds, two assists, and a block in an 86–84 loss against the Spurs. On November 9, 2012, Perkins dished a career-high tying six assists, and also had nine points, four rebounds, and a steal in a 105–94 win against the Detroit Pistons. On February 8, 2013, Perkins scored a season-high 17 points, along with nine rebounds, three assists, two steals and three blocks in a 127–96 win against the Phoenix Suns. According to The Oklahoman, Perkins said this in response to his performance: "I'm just going to keep working. Guys are doubling Kevin (Durant) and Russ now, so I'm just trying to find the open spot. I've been watching a lot of film and going to the gym and working on my game. I'm just trying to find an open spot when they get doubled." On February 10, 2013, Perkins had a career-high tying three steals, as well as four rebounds, two assists, and three blocks in a 97–69 win against the Suns. On March 20, 2013, Perkins grabbed a season-high 15 rebounds, and also had an assist in a 90–89 overtime loss against the Memphis Grizzlies.

In the 2013 NBA playoffs, the Thunder defeated the Houston Rockets in the First Round, but were defeated by the Grizzlies in the Conference Semifinals. During Game 1 of the Conference Semifinals, Perkins had seven rebounds and three assists in a 93–91 win. Perkins averaged 2.2 points and 3.7 rebounds per game in the playoffs.

==== 2013–14 season ====
To start the 2013–14 NBA season, Perkins had four points, eight rebounds, one assist and one steal in a 101–98 win against the Utah Jazz. On December 13, 2013, Perkins dished a season-high four assists, and also had six points and three rebounds in a 122–97 win against the Lakers. On January 5, 2014, Perkins scored a season-high 12 points, and also had six rebounds, two assists, one steal and one block in a 119–96 win against his former team, the Boston Celtics. On January 17, 2014, Perkins grabbed a season-high 12 rebounds, and also had six points, two assists and two steals in a 127–121 win against the Golden State Warriors. On February 5, 2014, Perkins tied his season-high, getting 12 rebounds, six points, two assists, and one steal in a 106–97 win against the Minnesota Timberwolves.

In the 2014 NBA playoffs, the Thunder defeated the Grizzlies in the First Round, then the Clippers in the Conference Semifinals, but got eliminated by the Spurs in the Conference Finals. During Game 2 of the Conference Semifinals, Perkins had eight points and nine rebounds in a 112–101 win. During Game 4 of the Conference Finals, Perkins had 10 rebounds, two points, two blocks, and one steal in a 105–92 win. Perkins averaged 3.2 points and 5.4 rebounds throughout the playoffs.

==== 2014–15 season ====
During the 2014–15 NBA season, Perkins was playing bench minutes, as Steven Adams replaced him. During the season opener, Perkins had four points, eight rebounds, one steal and one block in a 106–89 loss against the Portland Trail Blazers. On November 1, 2014, Perkins scored a season-high 17 points, while also getting five rebounds in a 102–91 win against the Denver Nuggets. On December 14, 2014, Perkins grabbed a season-high 10 rebounds, as well as five points, one assist, one steal, and one block in a 112–88 win against the Phoenix Suns.

On February 19, 2015, Perkins was traded to the Utah Jazz in a three-team trade that also involved the Detroit Pistons. He was subsequently waived by the Jazz two days later.

=== Cleveland Cavaliers (2015) ===
On February 24, 2015, Perkins signed with the Cleveland Cavaliers and made his debut later that day as he scored two points in two minutes off the bench in a 102–93 win over the Detroit Pistons. The Cavaliers made it to the 2015 NBA Finals, but they lost to the Golden State Warriors in six games.

=== New Orleans Pelicans (2015–2016) ===
On July 28, 2015, Perkins signed with the New Orleans Pelicans. He made his debut for the Pelicans in the team's season opening loss to the Golden State Warriors on October 27. In just under 16 minutes of action as a starter, he recorded 10 points on 5-of-5 shooting and 4 rebounds. On November 6, he was ruled out for three months with a right pectoral injury. He returned to the Pelicans' line-up on December 11, but did not play against the Washington Wizards.

=== Canton Charge (2017–2018) ===
On September 25, 2017, Perkins signed with the Cleveland Cavaliers, returning to the franchise for a second stint. On October 14, 2017, he was waived by the Cavaliers after appearing in three preseason games. He subsequently joined the Cavaliers’ NBA G League affiliate, the Canton Charge. On February 9, 2018, he opted to retire from the NBA G League.

=== Return to Cleveland (2018) ===
On April 11, 2018, Perkins returned to the Cavaliers, signing a contract for the remainder of the season. That same day ended up being Perkins' first and only game that he played for Cleveland during his second stint with the team, as Cleveland would lose 98–110 to the New York Knicks with Perkins recording 3 points, 2 assists, 1 rebound and 1 steal.

The Cavaliers made it to the 2018 NBA Finals, where they lost 4–0 to the Golden State Warriors, but Perkins did not play during the postseason. Perkins was waived by the Cavaliers on July 17, 2018.

== Broadcasting career ==
Following his retirement, Perkins became an on-air sports commentator and analyst for ESPN and NBC Sports Boston including on ESPN television sports talk shows NBA Today, Get Up, First Take, and SportsCenter. He received criticism for statements made relating to race and the MVP candidacy of Serbian NBA player Nikola Jokić.

== NBA career statistics ==
Legend
GP	Games played	GS	Games started	MPG	Minutes per game
FG%	Field goal percentage	3P%	3-point field goal percentage	FT%	Free throw percentage
RPG	Rebounds per game	APG	Assists per game	SPG	Steals per game
BPG	Blocks per game	PPG	Points per game	**Bold**	Career high
†	Won an NBA championship

=== Regular season ===
Year	Team	GP	GS	MPG	FG%	3P%	FT%	RPG	APG	SPG	BPG	PPG
2003–04	Boston	10	0	3.5	.533	.000	**.667**	1.4	.3	.0	.2	2.2
2004–05	Boston	60	3	9.1	.471	.000	.638	2.9	.4	.2	.6	2.5
2005–06	Boston	68	40	19.6	.515	.000	.615	5.9	1.0	.3	1.5	5.2
2006–07	Boston	72	53	21.9	.491	.000	.600	5.2	1.3	.3	1.3	4.5
2007–08†	Boston	**78**	**78**	24.5	**.615**	.000	.623	6.1	1.1	.4	1.5	6.9
2008–09	Boston	76	76	**29.6**	.577	.000	.600	**8.1**	1.3	.3	**2.0**	8.5
2009–10	Boston	**78**	**78**	27.6	.602	.000	.582	7.6	1.0	.3	1.7	**10.1**
2010–11	Boston	12	7	26.1	.542	.000	.575	8.1	.8	.2	.8	7.3
2010–11	Oklahoma City	17	17	25.2	.493	.000	.531	7.9	.9	.4	.9	5.1
2011–12	Oklahoma City	65	65	26.8	.489	.000	.652	6.6	1.2	.4	1.1	5.0
2012–13	Oklahoma City	**78**	**78**	25.1	.457	.000	.611	6.0	1.4	.6	1.1	4.2
2013–14	Oklahoma City	62	62	19.5	.451	.000	.552	4.9	1.1	.4	.5	3.4
2014–15	Oklahoma City	51	3	19.2	.441	.000	.507	5.5	.8	.3	.7	4.0
2014–15	Cleveland	17	0	9.8	.488	.000	.500	2.4	.5	.1	.2	2.6
2015–16	New Orleans	37	5	14.6	.533	.000	.440	3.5	.8	.3	.3	2.5
2017–18	Cleveland	1	0	15.0	.500	.000	.500	1.0	**2.0**	**1.0**	.0	3.0
Career		782	565	21.9	.530	.000	.594	5.8	1.0	.3	1.2	5.4

=== Playoffs ===
Year	Team	GP	GS	MPG	FG%	3P%	FT%	RPG	APG	SPG	BPG	PPG
2005	Boston	6	0	4.7	**.800**	.000	.333	1.0	.0	.0	.5	1.5
2008†	Boston	**25**	**25**	25.2	.585	.000	.678	6.1	.5	.6	1.3	6.6
2009	Boston	14	14	**36.6**	.575	.000	.667	**11.0**	**1.4**	.4	**2.6**	**11.9**
2010	Boston	23	23	25.0	.510	.000	.600	6.2	1.0	.4	1.4	5.7
2011	Oklahoma City	17	17	28.2	.453	.000	.576	6.1	.8	.2	.8	4.5
2012	Oklahoma City	20	20	25.9	.416	.000	.800	6.2	.7	.4	1.3	4.7
2013	Oklahoma City	11	11	19.1	.270	.000	**1.000**	3.7	.6	**.7**	.5	2.2
2014	Oklahoma City	19	19	20.2	.533	.000	.800	5.4	.7	.2	.3	3.2
2015	Cleveland	8	0	4.1	.250	.000	.600	1.1	.0	.0	.4	1.3
Career		143	129	23.6	.502	.000	.662	5.9	.7	.4	1.1	5.1

== Business ventures ==
Around 2018, Perkins partnered with his brother-in-law to create Big League Exotics, a French Bulldog breeding company.

In February 2024, Perkins and Chris Ricciardi announced a new company called Nilly which would pay students in return for the ability to manage their name, image, and likeness rights. By October of that year, Nilly contracts were being analyzed publicly and interpreted as predatory loans, because Nilly retained exclusive NIL rights for seven years in addition to taking 10–50% of an athlete's future income. USA Today concluded, "Perkins and Nilly are taking advantage of young athletes with these deals...When someone finally looks into this, expect it to all come crashing down."

== Personal life ==
Perkins is a practicing Catholic. He was an altar boy in his youth, although it was often problematic to find a cassock to fit him due to his height. His son was born on September 10, 2007. On July 25, 2009, Perkins married his longtime girlfriend, Vanity Alpough. His second son was born on October 10, 2011. His twin son and daughter were born on October 20, 2015.

Perkins' cousin, Ethan Rusbatch, is a New Zealander who plays in the New Zealand NBL.

On October 10, 2013, Perkins posted a $1,000 bond on a misdemeanor assault charge. He allegedly punched a man and a woman after a dispute following a traffic collision.

On June 20, 2026, Perkins agreed to become the general manager for the basketball program at Jackson State.
