= 2009–10 Boston Celtics season =

Season of National Basketball Association team the Boston Celtics

- Conference champions
- Division champions
- Head coach: Doc Rivers
- President: Danny Ainge
- General manager: Danny Ainge
- Owners: Boston Basketball Partners
- Arena: TD Garden

Results
- Record: 50–32 (.610)
- Place: Division: 1st (Atlantic); Conference: 4th (Eastern)
- Playoff finish: NBA Finals (Lost to Lakers 3–4)
- Stats at Basketball Reference

Local media
- Television: CSN New England
- Radio: WEEI

The 2009–10 Boston Celtics season was the 64th season of the franchise in the National Basketball Association (NBA). The Celtics finished with a record of 50–32, a 12 win drop off from the previous season. They finished 1st in the Atlantic Division and 4th in the Eastern Conference.

In the playoffs, the Celtics defeated the Miami Heat in five games in the First Round, then defeated the top-seeded Cleveland Cavaliers (in a rematch of the 2008 Conference semifinals) again in six games in the Semifinals, and finally, defeated the second-seeded Orlando Magic (the runner-up of last year's Finals as well as the team that defeated the Celtics in last season's Conference semifinals in seven games) in six games in the conference finals to advance to the NBA Finals for the twenty-first time in franchise history.

The Celtics made it back to the NBA Finals after a one-year hiatus and played against the defending NBA champion and their rival, the Los Angeles Lakers for the 12th time. In a rematch of the 2008 NBA Finals, in which the Celtics defeated the Lakers in six games to capture their seventeenth championship, the Celtics were defeated this time by the Lakers in seven games.

The Celtics would not reach the Finals again until 2022 where they faced Golden State Warriors in a rematch of the 1964 NBA Finals and lost in six games.

== Key dates ==
- June 25 – The 2009 NBA draft took place in New York City.
- July 8 – The free agency period started.
- October 27 – The regular season started with a 95–89 win over the Cleveland Cavaliers.
- March 24 – The Celtics clinched a spot in the Playoffs with a 113–99 win over the Denver Nuggets.
- March 26 – The Celtics clinched the Atlantic Division title with a 94–86 win over the Sacramento Kings.
- April 17 – The Celtics won Game 1 in their first-round playoff series against the Miami Heat (85–76).
- April 27 – The Celtics won their series against the Miami Heat 4–1 and advanced to the Eastern Conference semi-finals after a 96–86 win in Game 5.
- May 13 – The Celtics advanced to the Eastern Conference finals after they won their series 4–2 against the Cleveland Cavaliers following a 94–85 win in Game 6.
- May 28 – The Celtics advanced to the NBA Finals after they defeated the Orlando Magic 96–84 in Game 6 to win the series 4–2.
- June 17 – The Celtics lost to the Los Angeles Lakers 83–79 in Game 7 of the NBA Finals and failed to capture their 18th NBA Championship.

== Draft picks ==
Round	Pick	Player	Position	Nationality	College/Team
2	58	Lester Hudson	PG	United States	Tennessee-Martin

== Roster ==
2009–10 Boston Celtics roster
Players

Pos.	No.	Player	Height	Weight	DOB	From
SG	20	Ray Allen	6 ft 5 in (1.96 m)	205 lb (93 kg)	1975-07-20	Connecticut
SG	42	Tony Allen	6 ft 4 in (1.93 m)	213 lb (97 kg)	1982-01-11	Oklahoma State
G/F	7	Marquis Daniels	6 ft 6 in (1.98 m)	200 lb (91 kg)	1981-01-07	Auburn
F/C	11	Glen Davis	6 ft 10 in (2.08 m)	289 lb (131 kg)	1986-01-01	LSU
G/F	40	Michael Finley	6 ft 7 in (2.01 m)	225 lb (102 kg)	1973-03-06	Wisconsin
F/C	5	Kevin Garnett	6 ft 11 in (2.11 m)	253 lb (115 kg)	1976-05-19	Farragut Academy (IL)
G	0	Oliver Lafayette	6 ft 2 in (1.88 m)	190 lb (86 kg)	1984-05-04	Houston
C	43	Kendrick Perkins	6 ft 10 in (2.08 m)	280 lb (127 kg)	1984-11-10	Clifton J. Ozen HS (TX)
SF	34	Paul Pierce	6 ft 7 in (2.01 m)	235 lb (107 kg)	1977-10-13	Kansas
PG	4	Nate Robinson	5 ft 9 in (1.75 m)	180 lb (82 kg)	1984-05-31	Washington
PG	9	Rajon Rondo	6 ft 1 in (1.85 m)	171 lb (78 kg)	1986-02-22	Kentucky
PF	44	Brian Scalabrine	6 ft 9 in (2.06 m)	235 lb (107 kg)	1978-03-18	USC
F/C	30	Rasheed Wallace	6 ft 11 in (2.11 m)	230 lb (104 kg)	1974-09-17	North Carolina
F/C	13	Shelden Williams	6 ft 9 in (2.06 m)	250 lb (113 kg)	1983-10-21	Duke

Coaches
Head coach
- Doc Rivers
Assistant(s)
- Kevin Eastman
- Armond Hill
- Mike Longabardi
- Clifford Ray
- Tom Thibodeau

Legend
- (DP) Unsigned draft pick
- (FA) Free agent
- (S) Suspended
- Injured

Roster
Updated: April 14, 2010

== Preseason ==
2009 preseason game log
Total: 6–2 (Home: 3–0; Road: 3–2)
Preseason: 6–2 (home: 3–0; road: 3–2)

Game	Date	Team	Score	High points	High rebounds	High assists	Location Attendance	Record
1	October 7	@ Houston	L 90–96				State Farm Arena; 6,300	0–1
2	October 9	New York	W 96–82				TD Garden; 18,624	1–1
3	October 11	New Jersey	W 100–93				TD Garden; 18,624	2–1
4	October 13	@ New Jersey	W 91–88				Prudential Center; 12,790	3–1
5	October 14	Toronto	W 106–90				XL Center; 10,117	4–1
6	October 18	@ Toronto	W 101–82				Air Canada Centre; 13,607	5–1
7	October 20	@ New York	L 103–108				Madison Square Garden; 18,792	5–2
8	October 21	@ Cleveland	W 96–82				Value City Arena; 18,021	6–2

2009–10 preseason schedule

== Regular season ==
=== Standings ===
Atlantic Division	W	L	PCT	GB	Home	Road	Div
y-Boston Celtics	50	32	.610	–	24–17	26–15	13–3
Toronto Raptors	40	42	.488	10	25–16	15–26	11–5
New York Knicks	29	53	.354	21	18–23	11–30	6–10
Philadelphia 76ers	27	55	.329	23	12–29	15–26	7–9
New Jersey Nets	12	70	.146	38	8–33	4–37	3–13

#	Eastern Conference				
#	Team	W	L	PCT	GB
1	z-Cleveland Cavaliers	61	21	.744	–
2	y-Orlando Magic	59	23	.720	2
3	x-Atlanta Hawks	53	29	.646	8
4	y-Boston Celtics	50	32	.610	11
5	x-Miami Heat	47	35	.573	14
6	x-Milwaukee Bucks	46	36	.561	15
7	x-Charlotte Bobcats	44	38	.537	17
8	x-Chicago Bulls	41	41	.500	20
9	Toronto Raptors	40	42	.488	21
10	Indiana Pacers	32	50	.390	29
11	New York Knicks	29	53	.354	32
12	Philadelphia 76ers	27	55	.329	34
13	Detroit Pistons	27	55	.329	34
14	Washington Wizards	26	56	.317	35
15	New Jersey Nets	12	70	.146	49

=== Game log ===
2009–10 game log
Total: 50–32 (home: 24–17; road: 26–15)
October: 3–0 (home: 2–0; road: 1–0)

Game	Date	Team	Score	High points	High rebounds	High assists	Location Attendance	Record
1	October 27	@ Cleveland	W 95–89	Paul Pierce (23)	Paul Pierce (11)	Rajon Rondo (10)	Quicken Loans Arena; 20,562	1–0
2	October 28	New Orleans	W 92–59	Ray Allen (18)	Shelden Williams (9)	Rajon Rondo (11)	TD Garden; 18,624	2–0
3	October 30	Chicago	W 118–90	Paul Pierce (22)	Shelden Williams (10)	Rajon Rondo (16)	TD Garden; 18,624	3–0

November: 10–4 (home: 5–3; road: 5–1)

Game	Date	Team	Score	High points	High rebounds	High assists	Location Attendance	Record
4	November 1	New Orleans	W 97–87	Paul Pierce (27)	Kevin Garnett, Kendrick Perkins (7)	Rajon Rondo (10)	TD Garden; 18,624	4–0
5	November 3	@ Philadelphia	W 105–74	Paul Pierce (21)	Paul Pierce (8)	Rajon Rondo (5)	Wachovia Center; 11,251	5–0
6	November 4	@ Minnesota	W 92–90	Rajon Rondo (18)	Kevin Garnett (11)	Rajon Rondo (6)	Target Center; 19,133	6–0
7	November 6	Phoenix	L 103–110	Kevin Garnett (26)	Kevin Garnett (8)	Rajon Rondo (11)	TD Garden; 18,624	6–1
8	November 7	@ New Jersey	W 86–76	Paul Pierce, Rajon Rondo (16)	Kevin Garnett (13)	Paul Pierce (7)	Izod Center; 16,119	7–1
9	November 11	Utah	W 105–86	Kevin Garnett (18)	Kendrick Perkins (8)	Rajon Rondo (11)	TD Garden; 18,624	8–1
10	November 13	Atlanta	L 86–97	Paul Pierce (24)	Kendrick Perkins (9)	Rajon Rondo (9)	TD Garden; 18,624	8–2
11	November 14	@ Indiana	L 104–113	Ray Allen (24)	Kendrick Perkins (13)	Paul Pierce, Rajon Rondo, Ray Allen (4)	Conseco Fieldhouse; 18,165	8–3
12	November 18	Golden State	W 109–95	Paul Pierce (19)	Kendrick Perkins, Rajon Rondo (7)	Rajon Rondo (12)	TD Garden; 18,624	9–3
13	November 20	Orlando	L 78–83	Paul Pierce (21)	Rasheed Wallace (13)	Ray Allen, Rajon Rondo (6)	TD Garden; 18,624	9–4
14	November 22	@ New York	W 107–105	Paul Pierce (33)	Kendrick Perkins (13)	Rajon Rondo (10)	Madison Square Garden; 19,763	10–4
15	November 25	Philadelphia	W 113–110	Paul Pierce (27)	Kendrick Perkins (8)	Rajon Rondo (7)	TD Garden; 18,624	11–4
16	November 27	Toronto	W 116–110	Ray Allen (20)	Kevin Garnett (7)	Rajon Rondo (11)	TD Garden; 18,624	12–4
17	November 29	@ Miami	W 92–85	Kevin Garnett (24)	Kendrick Perkins (13)	Rajon Rondo (11)	American Airlines Arena; 18,104	13–4

December: 10–4 (home: 3–1; road: 7–3)

Game	Date	Team	Score	High points	High rebounds	High assists	Location Attendance	Record
18	December 1	@ New Orleans	W 108–90	Ray Allen (27)	Kendrick Perkins (12)	Rajon Rondo (9)	Time Warner Cable Arena; 15,129	14–4
19	December 3	@ San Antonio	W 90–83	Kevin Garnett (20)	Kevin Garnett, Kendrick Perkins (7)	Rajon Rondo (12)	AT&T Center; 18,581	15–4
20	December 4	@ Oklahoma City	W 105–87	Kevin Garnett (23)	Kevin Garnett, Kendrick Perkins (8)	Rajon Rondo (6)	Ford Center; 18,203	16–4
21	December 8	Milwaukee	W 98–89	Kevin Garnett (25)	Kevin Garnett, Rajon Rondo (9)	Rajon Rondo (13)	TD Garden; 18,624	17–4
22	December 10	@ Washington	W 104–102	Rajon Rondo (21)	Kendrick Perkins (11)	Rajon Rondo (11)	Verizon Center; 20,173	18–4
23	December 12	@ Chicago	W 106–80	Rajon Rondo (16)	Kevin Garnett (10)	Rajon Rondo (14)	United Center; 21,257	19–4
24	December 14	@ Memphis	W 110–105	Paul Pierce (19)	Kevin Garnett (8)	Rajon Rondo (9)	FedExForum; 14,193	20–4
25	December 18	Philadelphia	L 97–98	Kevin Garnett (21)	Kendrick Perkins (16)	Rajon Rondo (10)	TD Garden; 18,624	20–5
26	December 20	Minnesota	W 122–104	Paul Pierce (29)	Kendrick Perkins (11)	Rajon Rondo (15)	TD Garden; 18624	21–5
27	December 22	Indiana	W 103–94	Ray Allen (23)	Rasheed Wallace (13)	Rajon Rondo (9)	TD Garden; 18,624	22–5
28	December 25	@ Orlando	W 86–77	Ray Allen (18)	Rajon Rondo (13)	Rajon Rondo (8)	Amway Arena; 17,461	23–5
29	December 27	@ L.A. Clippers	L 90–92	Rajon Rondo (20)	Tony Allen (10)	Rajon Rondo (6)	Staples Center; 19,060	23–6
30	December 28	@ Golden State	L 99–103	Rajon Rondo (30)	Kendrick Perkins (14)	Rajon Rondo (15)	Oracle Arena; 19,259	23–7
31	December 30	@ Phoenix	L 98–116	Eddie House (19)	Kendrick Perkins, Tony Allen (7)	Rajon Rondo (8)	US Airways Arena; 18,422	23–8

January: 6–8 (home: 3–4; road: 3–4)

Game	Date	Team	Score	High points	High rebounds	High assists	Location Attendance	Record
32	January 2	Toronto	W 103–96	Ray Allen (23)	Kendrick Perkins (10)	Tony Allen (7)	TD Garden; 18,624	24–8
33	January 6	@ Miami	W 112–106	Rajon Rondo (25)	Kendrick Perkins (10)	Rajon Rondo (8)	American Airlines Arena; 19,600	25–8
34	January 8	@ Atlanta	L 85–93	Paul Pierce (21)	Kendrick Perkins (14)	Rajon Rondo (10)	Philips Arena; 15,149	25–9
35	January 10	@ Toronto	W 114–107	Rasheed Wallace (29)	Rajon Rondo (10)	Rajon Rondo (13)	Air Canada Centre; 19,800	26–9
36	January 11	Atlanta	L 96–102	Rajon Rondo (26)	Kendrick Perkins (9)	Rajon Rondo (7)	TD Garden; 18,624	26–10
37	January 13	@ New Jersey	W 111–87	Paul Pierce (24)	Kendrick Perkins (8)	Rajon Rondo (14)	Izod Center; 14,112	27–10
38	January 14	Chicago	L 83–96	Paul Pierce (20)	Kendrick Perkins (10)	Rajon Rondo (7)	TD Garden; 18,624	27–11
39	January 18	Dallas	L 90–99	Paul Pierce (24)	Kendrick Perkins (12)	Rajon Rondo (12)	TD Garden; 18,624	27–12
40	January 20	@ Detroit	L 86–92	Paul Pierce, Rajon Rondo (21)	Rajon Rondo (8)	Rajon Rondo (7)	The Palace of Auburn Hills; 17,375	27–13
41	January 22	Portland	W 98–95	Paul Pierce (24)	Kendrick Perkins (11)	Rajon Rondo (9)	TD Garden; 18,624	28–13
42	January 25	L.A. Clippers	W 95–89	Paul Pierce (22)	Kendrick Perkins (15)	Rajon Rondo (12)	TD Garden; 18,624	29–13
43	January 28	@ Orlando	L 94–96	Ray Allen (20)	Kevin Garnett, Rajon Rondo (7)	Rajon Rondo (8)	Amway Arena; 17,461	29–14
44	January 29	@ Atlanta	L 91–100	Paul Pierce (35)	Kendrick Perkins (12)	Rajon Rondo (8)	Philips Arena; 18,732	29–15
45	January 31	L.A. Lakers	L 89–90	Rajon Rondo (21)	Kendrick Perkins (10)	Rajon Rondo (12)	TD Garden; 18,624	29–16

February: 7–5 (home: 3–3; road: 4–2)

Game	Date	Team	Score	High points	High rebounds	High assists	Location Attendance	Record
46	February 1	@ Washington	W 99–88	Kevin Garnett (19)	Paul Pierce (8)	Rajon Rondo (12)	Verizon Center; 20,173	30–16
47	February 3	Miami	W 107–102	Ray Allen (23)	Ray Allen (7)	Rajon Rondo (14)	TD Garden; 18,624	31–16
48	February 5	New Jersey	W 96–87	Ray Allen (26)	Ray Allen, Kevin Garnett (7)	Rajon Rondo (11)	TD Garden; 18,624	32–16
49	February 7	Orlando	L 89–96	Rajon Rondo (17)	Kevin Garnett (9)	Rajon Rondo (9)	TD Garden; 18,624	32–17
50	February 10	@ New Orleans	L 85–93	Paul Pierce (15)	Kevin Garnett, Kendrick Perkins (7)	Paul Pierce, Rajon Rondo (4)	New Orleans Arena; 14,848	32–18
All-Star Break
51	February 16	@ Sacramento	W 95–92	Paul Pierce, Rasheed Wallace (17)	Kevin Garnett (9)	Rajon Rondo (6)	ARCO Arena; 14,439	33–18
52	February 18	@ L.A. Lakers	W 87–86	Ray Allen (24)	Kendrick Perkins (14)	Rajon Rondo (11)	Staples Center; 18,997	34–18
53	February 19	@ Portland	W 96–76	Ray Allen (21)	Kendrick Perkins (9)	Rajon Rondo (11)	Rose Garden; 20,618	35–18
54	February 21	@ Denver	L 105–114	Ray Allen (25)	Glen Davis (7)	Rajon Rondo (11)	Pepsi Center; 19,818	35–19
55	February 23	New York	W 110–106	Ray Allen (24)	Kevin Garnett (8)	Rajon Rondo (16)	TD Garden; 18,624	36–19
56	February 25	Cleveland	L 88–108	Ray Allen (21)	Kevin Garnett (10)	Rajon Rondo (11)	TD Garden; 18,624	36–20
57	February 27	New Jersey	L 96–104	Kevin Garnett (26)	Kevin Garnett (9)	Rajon Rondo (17)	TD Garden; 18,624	36–21

March: 11–6 (home: 7–3; road: 4–3)

Game	Date	Team	Score	High points	High rebounds	High assists	Location Attendance	Record
58	March 2	@ Detroit	W 105–100	Ray Allen (18)	Kevin Garnett (9)	Rajon Rondo (11)	The Palace of Auburn Hills; 17,956	37–21
59	March 3	New Orleans	W 104–80	Paul Pierce (27)	Marquis Daniels, Kevin Garnett (5)	Rajon Rondo (6)	TD Garden; 18,624	38–21
60	March 5	@ Philadelphia	W 96–86	Kevin Garnett (22)	Kevin Garnett (8)	Rajon Rondo (11)	Wachovia Center; 19,008	39–21
61	March 7	Washington	W 86–83	Ray Allen (25)	Kevin Garnett (10)	Rajon Rondo (7)	TD Garden; 18,624	40–21
62	March 9	@ Milwaukee	L 84–86	Rajon Rondo (20)	Kevin Garnett (10)	Rajon Rondo (6)	Bradley Center; 14,316	40–22
63	March 10	Memphis	L 91–111	Ray Allen, Rajon Rondo (17)	Kevin Garnett (7)	Rajon Rondo (8)	TD Garden; 18,624	40–23
64	March 12	Indiana	W 122–103	Paul Pierce (20)	Kendrick Perkins (7)	Rajon Rondo (11)	TD Garden; 18,624	41–23
65	March 14	@ Cleveland	L 93–104	Ray Allen (20)	Rajon Rondo (8)	Rajon Rondo (6)	Quicken Loans Arena; 20,562	41–24
66	March 15	Detroit	W 119–93	Ray Allen, Michael Finley, Paul Pierce (15)	Kevin Garnett, Kendrick Perkins (8)	Rajon Rondo (6)	TD Garden; 18,624	42–24
67	March 17	New York	W 109–97	Paul Pierce (29)	Kendrick Perkins (12)	Rajon Rondo (12)	TD Garden; 18,624	43–24
68	March 19	@ Houston	W 94–87	Paul Pierce (26)	Rasheed Wallace (9)	Rajon Rondo (10)	Toyota Center; 18,198	44–24
69	March 20	@ Dallas	W 102–93	Paul Pierce (29)	Rajon Rondo (10)	Paul Pierce, Rajon Rondo (5)	American Airlines Center; 20,488	45–24
70	March 22	@ Utah	L 97–110	Ray Allen (16)	Kendrick Perkins (8)	Rajon Rondo (6)	EnergySolutions Arena; 19,911	45–25
71	March 24	Denver	W 113–99	Paul Pierce (27)	Rajon Rondo (11)	Rajon Rondo (15)	TD Garden; 18,624	46–25
72	March 26	Sacramento	W 94–86	Paul Pierce (22)	Kevin Garnett (13)	Rajon Rondo (18)	TD Garden; 18,624	47–25
73	March 28	San Antonio	L 73–94	Paul Pierce (18)	Kevin Garnett (10)	Rajon Rondo (7)	TD Garden; 18,624	47–26
74	March 31	Oklahoma City	L 104–109	Kevin Garnett, Rasheed Wallace (18)	Kevin Garnett (9)	Rajon Rondo (11)	TD Garden; 18,624	47–27

April: 3–5 (home: 1–3; road: 2–2)

Game	Date	Team	Score	High points	High rebounds	High assists	Location Attendance	Record
75	April 2	Houston	L 114–119	Paul Pierce (27)	Rasheed Wallace (8)	Rajon Rondo (10)	TD Garden; 18,624	47–28
76	April 4	Cleveland	W 117–113	Ray Allen (33)	Kendrick Perkins (10)	Rajon Rondo (14)	TD Garden; 18,624	48–28
77	April 6	@ New York	L 101–104	Ray Allen (17)	Kendrick Perkins (8)	Rajon Rondo (6)	Madison Square Garden; 19,763	48–29
78	April 7	@ Toronto	W 115–104	Rajon Rondo (21)	Kendrick Perkins (9)	Rajon Rondo (7)	Air Canada Centre; 18,793	49–29
79	April 9	Washington	L 96–106	Rajon Rondo (17)	Paul Pierce (7)	Rajon Rondo (12)	TD Garden; 18,624	49–30
80	April 10	@ Milwaukee	W 105–90	Paul Pierce (24)	Glen Davis, Rasheed Wallace (7)	Rajon Rondo (10)	Bradley Center; 18,717	50–30
81	April 13	@ Chicago	L 93–101	Paul Pierce (28)	Kendrick Perkins (11)	Rajon Rondo (6)	United Center; 20,649	50–31
82	April 14	Milwaukee	L 95–106	Rajon Rondo (21)	Rajon Rondo, Rasheed Wallace (6)	Rajon Rondo (15)	TD Garden; 18,624	50–32

2009–10 season schedule

== Playoffs ==
=== Game log ===
2010 playoff game log
Total: 15–9 (home: 9–3; Away: 6–6)
First Round: 4–1 (home: 3–0; road: 1–1)

Game	Date	Team	Score	High points	High rebounds	High assists	Location Attendance	Series
1	April 17	Miami	W 85–76	Paul Pierce (16)	Kevin Garnett (9)	Rajon Rondo (10)	TD Garden; 18,624	1–0
2	April 20	Miami	W 106–77	Ray Allen (25)	Kendrick Perkins (10)	Rajon Rondo (12)	TD Garden; 18,624	2–0
3	April 23	@ Miami	W 100–98	Paul Pierce (32)	Kendrick Perkins (12)	Rajon Rondo (8)	American Airlines Arena; 19,500	3–0
4	April 26	@ Miami	L 92–101	Rajon Rondo (23)	Kevin Garnett (12)	Rajon Rondo (9)	American Airlines Arena; 19,520	3–1
5	April 27	Miami	W 96–86	Ray Allen (24)	Kevin Garnett, Rajon Rondo (8)	Rajon Rondo (12)	TD Garden; 18,624	4–1

Conference Semifinals: 4–2 (home: 2–1; road: 2–1)

Game	Date	Team	Score	High points	High rebounds	High assists	Location Attendance	Series
1	May 1	@ Cleveland	L 93–101	Rajon Rondo (27)	Kendrick Perkins (11)	Rajon Rondo (12)	Quicken Loans Arena; 20,562	0–1
2	May 3	@ Cleveland	W 104–86	Ray Allen (22)	Kevin Garnett (10)	Rajon Rondo (19)	Quicken Loans Arena; 20,562	1–1
3	May 7	Cleveland	L 95–124	Kevin Garnett (19)	Rajon Rondo (5)	Rajon Rondo (8)	TD Garden; 18,624	1–2
4	May 9	Cleveland	W 97–87	Rajon Rondo (29)	Rajon Rondo (18)	Rajon Rondo (13)	TD Garden; 18,624	2–2
5	May 11	@ Cleveland	W 120–88	Ray Allen (25)	Paul Pierce (11)	Paul Pierce, Rajon Rondo (7)	Quicken Loans Arena; 20,562	3–2
6	May 13	Cleveland	W 94–85	Kevin Garnett (22)	Kevin Garnett (12)	Rajon Rondo (12)	TD Garden; 18,624	4–2

Conference Finals: 4–2 (home: 2–1; road: 2–1)

Game	Date	Team	Score	High points	High rebounds	High assists	Location Attendance	Series
1	May 16	@ Orlando	W 92–88	Ray Allen (25)	Kevin Garnett (11)	Rajon Rondo (8)	Amway Arena; 17,461	1–0
2	May 18	@ Orlando	W 95–92	Paul Pierce (28)	Kevin Garnett (9)	Rajon Rondo (8)	Amway Arena; 17,461	2–0
3	May 22	Orlando	W 94–71	Glen Davis (17)	Paul Pierce (9)	Rajon Rondo (12)	TD Garden; 18,624	3–0
4	May 24	Orlando	L 92–96 (OT)	Paul Pierce (32)	Kevin Garnett (12)	Rajon Rondo (8)	TD Garden; 18,624	3–1
5	May 26	@ Orlando	L 92–113	Rasheed Wallace (21)	Kevin Garnett (5)	Ray Allen (7)	Amway Arena; 17,461	3–2
6	May 28	Orlando	W 96–84	Paul Pierce (31)	Paul Pierce (13)	Rajon Rondo (6)	TD Garden; 18,624	4–2

NBA Finals: 3–4 (home: 2–1; road: 1–3)

Game	Date	Team	Score	High points	High rebounds	High assists	Location Attendance	Series
1	June 3	@ L.A. Lakers	L 89–102	Paul Pierce (24)	Paul Pierce (9)	Rajon Rondo (8)	Staples Center; 18,997	0–1
2	June 6	@ L.A. Lakers	W 103–94	Ray Allen (32)	Rajon Rondo (12)	Rajon Rondo (10)	Staples Center; 18,997	1–1
3	June 8	L.A. Lakers	L 84–91	Kevin Garnett (25)	Kendrick Perkins (11)	Rajon Rondo (8)	TD Garden; 18,624	1–2
4	June 10	L.A. Lakers	W 96–89	Paul Pierce (19)	Kendrick Perkins (7)	Paul Pierce (5)	TD Garden; 18,624	2–2
5	June 13	L.A. Lakers	W 92–86	Paul Pierce (27)	Kevin Garnett (10)	Rajon Rondo (8)	TD Garden; 18,624	3–2
6	June 15	@ L.A. Lakers	L 67–89	Ray Allen (19)	Glen Davis (9)	Rajon Rondo (6)	Staples Center; 18,997	3–3
7	June 17	@ L.A. Lakers	L 79–83	Paul Pierce (18)	Paul Pierce (10)	Rajon Rondo (10)	Staples Center; 18,997	3–4

2010 playoff schedule

== Player statistics ==
Legend
GP	Games played	GS	Games started	MPG	Minutes per game
FG%	Field-goal percentage	3P%	3-point field-goal percentage	FT%	Free-throw percentage
RPG	Rebounds per game	APG	Assists per game	SPG	Steals per game
BPG	Blocks per game	PPG	Points per game

=== Season ===
Boston Celtics statistics
Player	GP	GS	MPG	FG%	3P%	FT%	RPG	APG	SPG	BPG	PPG
Ray Allen	80	80	35.2	.477	.363	.913	3.20	2.6	.80	.31	16.3
Tony Allen	54	8	16.5	.510	.000	.605	2.70	1.3	1.09	.35	6.1
Marquis Daniels	51	4	18.4	.498	.214	.607	1.90	1.3	.53	.12	5.6
Glen Davis	54	1	17.3	.437	.000	.696	3.80	.6	.39	.26	6.3
Michael Finley^{1}	21	1	15.0	.506	.463	.333	1.60	1.1	.19	.10	5.2
Kevin Garnett	69	69	29.9	.521	.200	.837	7.30	2.7	.99	.83	14.3
Oliver Lafayette	1	0	22.0	.500	.500	.000	4.00	2.0	.00	.00	7.0
Kendrick Perkins	78	78	27.6	.602	.000	.582	7.60	1.0	.33	1.69	10.1
Paul Pierce	71	71	34.0	.472	.414	.852	4.40	3.1	1.18	.44	18.3
Nate Robinson^{1}	26	0	14.7	.401	.414	.615	1.50	2.0	.85	.00	6.5
Rajon Rondo	81	81	36.6	.508	.213	.621	4.40	9.8	2.33	.14	13.7
Brian Scalabrine	52	3	9.1	.341	.327	.667	.90	.5	.17	.08	1.5
Rasheed Wallace	79	13	22.5	.409	.283	.768	4.10	1.0	1.01	.89	9.0
Shelden Williams	54	0	11.1	.521	.000	.765	2.70	.4	.24	.39	3.7

^{1}Stats with the Celtics.

=== Playoffs ===
Boston Celtics statistics
Player	GP	GS	MPG	FG%	3P%	FT%	RPG	APG	SPG	BPG	PPG
Ray Allen	24	24	38.5	.431	.386	.863	3.30	2.6	0.92	.13	16.1
Tony Allen	24	0	16.3	.489	.000	.778	1.70	.7	1.04	.58	5.1
Marquis Daniels	11	0	3.4	.385	.500	1.000	.90	.1	.00	.00	1.5
Glen Davis	24	1	20.1	.476	.000	.722	4.510	.5	.79	.38	7.3
Michael Finley	18	0	6.0	.250	.273	1.000	.60	.2	.22	.00	0.8
Kevin Garnett	23	23	33.3	.495	.000	.839	7.40	2.5	1.13	.87	15.0
Kendrick Perkins	23	23	25.0	.510	.000	.600	6.20	1.0	.39	1.39	5.7
Paul Pierce	24	24	38.8	.438	.392	.824	6.00	3.4	1.00	.58	18.8
Nate Robinson	17	0	7.5	.375	.333	.800	.80	1.1	.35	.06	4.2
Rajon Rondo	24	24	40.6	.463	.375	.596	5.60	9.3	1.92	.13	16.1
Brian Scalabrine	1	0	1.0	.000	.000	.000	.00	.0	.00	.00	.0
Rasheed Wallace	24	1	17.1	.416	.345	.828	3.00	.4	.42	.58	6.1
Shelden Williams	8	0	7.1	.444	.000	.833	1.60	.0	.13	.00	1.6

== Awards, records and milestones ==
=== Awards ===
==== Week/Month ====
- On December 7, 2009 Kevin Garnett was named Eastern Conference's Player of the Week (November 30 – December 6).
- On March 22, 2010 Paul Pierce was named Eastern Conference's Player of the Week (March 15–21).

==== All-Star ====
- Kevin Garnett was voted to his 11th consecutive (13th overall) All-Star Game as a starter.
- Paul Pierce was selected to his 8th All-Star Game.
- Rajon Rondo was selected to play in the All-Star Game for the first time in his career.
- Paul Pierce won the Three-Point Contest.

==== Season ====
- Rajon Rondo was named to the NBA All-Defensive First Team.

=== Records ===
- Rajon Rondo set two new single-season franchise records. On March 26, he grabbed his 168th steal of the season and broke Rick Fox's record of 167 steals in a season with the Boston Celtics. On April 2, he dished out his 716th assist of the season, thus breaking Bob Cousy's franchise record of 715 assists made in a season. Rondo dished out 794 assists and stole the ball 189 times in the 2009–10 season.

=== Milestones ===
- On October 27, 2009, game against the Cleveland Cavaliers Kevin Garnett passed Hall of Famer Moses Malone for 21st place on the NBA's career blocking list, having blocked 1,736 shots.
- On October 28, 2009, game against the New Orleans Hornets Paul Pierce passed Dan Majerle for 17th place on the NBA's career 3-pointer list with 1,363 3-pointers.
- On October 30, 2009, game against the Chicago Bulls Ray Allen passed Hall of Famer John Stockton for 33rd place on the NBA's career scoring list, having scored 19,715 points.
- On November 13, 2009, game against the Atlanta Hawks Paul Pierce passed Hall of Famer Bob McAdoo for 49th place on the NBA's career scoring list, having scored 18,790 points.
- On November 18, 2009, game against the Golden State Warriors Paul Pierce passed Hall of Famer Isiah Thomas for 48th place on the NBA's career scoring list, having scored 18,824 points.
- On November 20, 2009, game against the Orlando Magic Paul Pierce passed Chet Walker for 47th place on the NBA's career scoring list, having scored 18,845 points.
- On November 25, 2009, game against the Philadelphia 76ers Paul Pierce passed Antoine Walker for 16th place on the NBA's career 3-pointer list with 1,389 3-pointers.
- On December 1, 2009, game against the Charlotte Bobcats Paul Pierce passed Scottie Pippen for 46th place on the NBA's career scoring list, having scored 18,946 points.
- On December 3, 2009, game against the San Antonio Spurs Rasheed Wallace passed Clifford R. Robinson for 34th place on the NBA's career blocking list, having blocked 1,391 shots.
- On December 8, 2009, game against the Milwaukee Bucks Kevin Garnett passed Hall of Famer Hal Greer for 25th place on the NBA's career scoring list, having scored 21,601 points, and Micheal Ray Richardson for 36th place on career steal list with 1,465 steals.
- On December 10, 2009, game against the Washington Wizards Paul Pierce passed Brent Barry for 15th place on the NBA's career 3-pointer list with 1,397 3-pointers.
- On December 12, 2009, game against the Chicago Bulls Paul Pierce passed Dale Ellis and Reggie Theus for 44th place on the NBA's career scoring list, having scored 19,016 points.
- On December 18, 2009, game against the Philadelphia 76ers Kevin Garnett passed Artis Gilmore for 20th place on the NBA's career blocking list, having blocked 1,751 shots.
- On December 20, 2009, game against the Minnesota Timberwolves Ray Allen passed Tom Chambers for 32nd place on the NBA's career scoring list, having scored 20,059 points.
- On December 28, 2009, game against the Golden State Warriors Kevin Garnett passed Kevin Willis for 21st place on the NBA's career rebounding list with 11,903 rebounds.
- On January 8, 2010, game against the Atlanta Hawks Rasheed Wallace passed Mark West for 33rd place on the NBA's career blocking list, having blocked 1,404 shots.
- On January 13, 2010, game against the Brooklyn Nets Paul Pierce passed Hall of Famer Gail Goodrich for 43rd place on the NBA's career scoring list, having scored 19,191 points.
- On January 14, 2010, game against the Chicago Bulls Paul Pierce passed Eddie Johnson for 42nd place on the NBA's career scoring list, having scored 19,211 points.
- On January 25, 2010, game against the Los Angeles Clippers Paul Pierce passed Hall of Famer Bob Lanier for 41st place on the NBA's career scoring list, having scored 19,257 points.
- On February 1, 2010, game against the Washington Wizards Kevin Garnett passed Hall of Famer Larry Bird for 24th place on the NBA's career scoring list, having scored 21,792 points and Dennis Johnson for 35th place on the steals list with 1,478 steals.
- On February 5, 2010, game against the Brooklyn Nets Kevin Garnett passed Gary Payton for 23rd place on the NBA's career scoring list, having scored 21,816 points.
- On February 7, 2010, game against the Orlando Magic Kevin Garnett passed Dennis Rodman for 20th place on the NBA's career rebounding list with 11,960 rebounds.
- On February 7, 2010, game against the Orlando Magic Paul Pierce passed T. R. Dunn for 50th place on the NBA's career steals list with 1,318 steals.
- On February 21, 2010, game against the Denver Nuggets Kevin Garnett passed Hall of Famer Elvin Hayes for 19th place on the NBA's career blocking list, having blocked 20,521 points.
- On February 21, 2010, game against the Denver Nuggets Ray Allen passed Mitch Richmond for 31st place on the NBA's career scoring list, having scored 20,510 points.
- On February 23, 2010, game against the New York Knicks Kevin Garnett became the 20th player in NBA history to reach 12,000 rebounds in his career.
- On March 3, 2010, game against the Charlotte Bobcats Paul Pierce passed Terry Cummings for 40th place on the NBA's career scoring list, having scored 19,482 points.
- On March 10, 2010, game against the Memphis Grizzlies Paul Pierce passed Walter Davis for 39th place on the NBA's career scoring list, having scored 19,532 points.
- On March 15, 2010, game against the Detroit Pistons Ray Allen passed Hall of Famer George Gervin for 31st place on the NBA's career scoring list, having scored 20,510 points (Dirk Nowitzki has passed Ray Allen since February 21).
- On March 17, 2010, game against the New York Knicks Paul Pierce passed Clifford Robinson for 38th place on the NBA's career scoring list, having scored 19,614 points.

== Injuries and surgeries ==
- Kendrick Perkins tore two ligaments in his right knee in Game 6 of the NBA Finals and missed the rest of the playoffs

== Transactions ==
Boston Celtics

Players Added

Via draft

- Lester Hudson

Via free agency

- Rasheed Wallace (from Pistons)
- Marquis Daniels (from Pacers)
- Shelden Williams (from T'Wolves)
- Michael Finley (from Mavericks)
- Tony Gaffney
- Oliver Lafayette

Via trade

- Nate Robinson (from Knicks)
- Marcus Landry (from Knicks)
Players Lost

Via free agency

- Stephon Marbury
- Leon Powe (to Cavaliers)
- Mikki Moore (to Warriors)

Via trade

- J. R. Giddens (to Knicks)
- Eddie House (to Knicks)
- Bill Walker (to Knicks)

Via waiver

- Gabe Pruitt
- Lester Hudson
- Marcus Landry
