= Marquis Daniels =

American basketball player (born 1981)

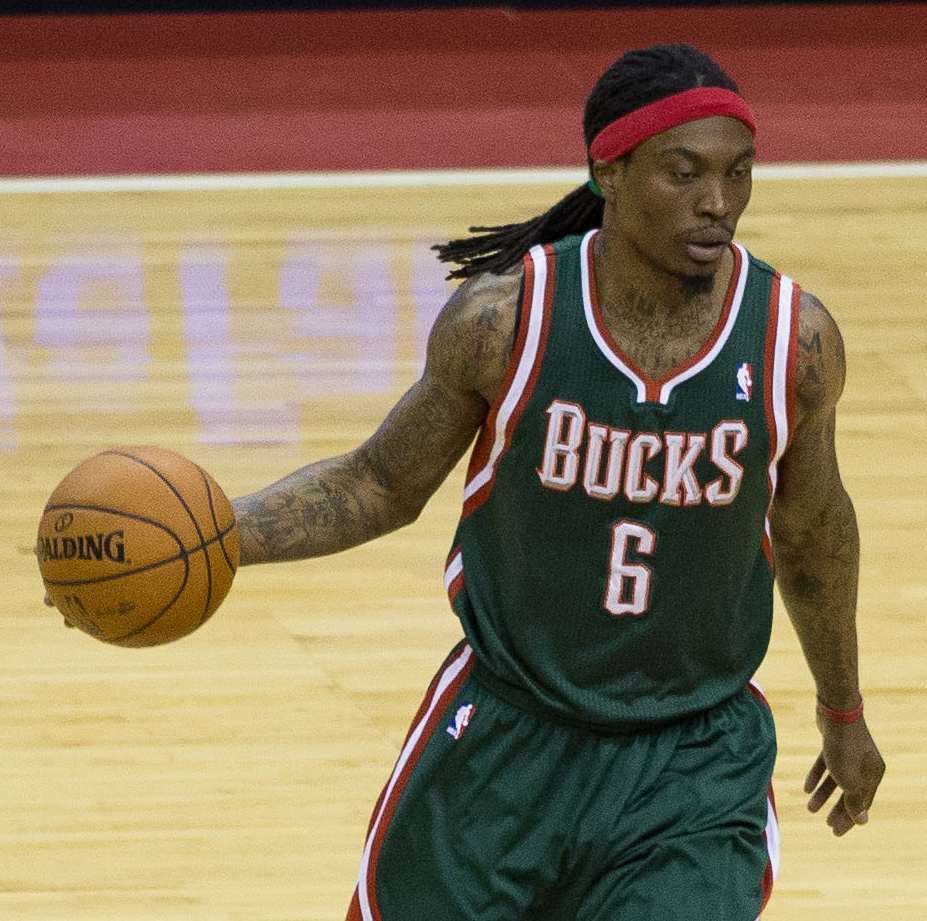
- Daniels with the Milwaukee Bucks in 2013

Auburn Tigers
- Title: Player development coach
- League: Southeastern Conference

Personal information
- Born: January 7, 1981 (age 45) Jasper, Florida, U.S.
- Listed height: 6 ft 6 in (1.98 m)
- Listed weight: 200 lb (91 kg)

Career information
- High school: Edgewater (Orlando, Florida); Mount Zion Christian (Durham, North Carolina)
- College: Auburn (1999–2003)
- NBA draft: 2003: undrafted
- Playing career: 2003–2013
- Position: Shooting guard / small forward
- Number: 6, 7, 8, 4
- Coaching career: 2018–present

Career history

Playing
- 2003–2006: Dallas Mavericks
- 2006–2009: Indiana Pacers
- 2009–2012: Boston Celtics
- 2012–2013: Milwaukee Bucks

Career highlights
- NBA All-Rookie Second Team (2004); Second-team All-SEC (2003); Third-team All-SEC (2001); Fourth-team Parade All-American (1999)
- Stats at NBA.com
- Stats at Basketball Reference

Marquis Antwane Daniels (born January 7, 1981) is an American former professional basketball player in the National Basketball Association (NBA). He played college basketball for the Auburn Tigers before going undrafted in the 2003 NBA draft. He played his first three years for the Dallas Mavericks before being traded to the Indiana Pacers. Daniels then signed with the Boston Celtics in 2009 and the Milwaukee Bucks in 2012.

== High school career ==
Daniels attended Edgewater High School in his hometown Orlando, Florida, before transferring to Mt. Zion Christian Academy for his senior year.

== College career ==
In his four-year career at Auburn, Daniels played 111 games, averaging 13.8 points, 5.6 rebounds, 2.6 assists and 1.9 steals in 28.7 minutes per game. In 2003, Auburn reached the Sweet 16 where Daniels averaged 23.3 points and 7.0 rebounds in three games, including an impressive 27-point, nine-rebound performance in a close one-point loss against the eventual national champion Syracuse.

Daniels graduated from Auburn University with a degree in Sociology in just three-and-a-half years. He averaged 18.4 points, 6.2 rebounds, 3.3 assists and 2.3 steals per game as a senior, and was named to the All-SEC second team as a senior and team MVP as a sophomore, junior and senior.

== Professional career ==
=== Dallas Mavericks (2003–2006) ===
After going undrafted in the 2003 NBA draft, Daniels joined the Dallas Mavericks for the 2003 NBA Summer League and later signed a one-year deal with the Mavericks. Daniels was mostly a third-stringer during his rookie season, used only when victory was all but sure. In the short minutes he was on the floor however, he showed flashes of brilliance. When Steve Nash was out with a stomach flu, head coach Don Nelson plugged in Daniels as the starting point guard and the rookie delivered with a near triple-double finishing with 14 points, 9 rebounds and 9 assists followed by a 16-point, 7 rebound and 8 assist game.

Although his time as a starter was short, after the team played struggled with Daniels out of the starting line-up decided to bring him back and put him back in the classic small ball line-up in a 118–88 triumph over the Orlando Magic on March 28, 2004. This line-up had the 6'9" Antoine Walker at center and Daniels at shooting guard, and was the permanent starting five member until their premature post-season demise. Daniels averaged 19.7 points, 6 rebounds and 5 assists during that 10-game stretch.

In July 2004, Daniels re-joined the Mavericks for the 2004 NBA Summer League and later signed a six-year, $38 million contract with the Mavericks.

=== Indiana Pacers (2006–2009) ===
On July 12, 2006, Daniels was traded to the Indiana Pacers in exchange for Austin Croshere.

On June 30, 2009, the Pacers announced their decision to not exercise their team option on the final year of Daniels' six-year contract, making him an unrestricted free agent.

=== Boston Celtics (2009–2012) ===
On September 1, 2009, Daniels signed with Boston Celtics.

On February 6, 2011, while the Celtics were playing against the Orlando Magic, Daniels collided with Magic guard Gilbert Arenas and suffered a bruised spinal cord. Daniels laid motionless on the floor for several minutes before being taken away on a stretcher. He gave the Boston crowd a thumbs up sign, and after arriving at a Boston Hospital, regained movement of his arms and legs.

On February 24, 2011, Daniels was traded, along with cash considerations, to the Sacramento Kings in exchange for a 2017 protected second-round draft pick. On July 1, 2011, he became a free agent, departing the Kings before playing in a game for them.

On December 9, 2011, Daniels re-signed with the Boston Celtics on a one-year deal.

=== Milwaukee Bucks (2012–2013) ===
On September 25, 2012, Daniels signed with the Milwaukee Bucks.

== Career statistics ==
Legend
GP	Games played	GS	Games started	MPG	Minutes per game
FG%	Field goal percentage	3P%	3-point field goal percentage	FT%	Free throw percentage
RPG	Rebounds per game	APG	Assists per game	SPG	Steals per game
BPG	Blocks per game	PPG	Points per game	**Bold**	Career high

=== NBA Regular season ===
Year	Team	GP	GS	MPG	FG%	3P%	FT%	RPG	APG	SPG	BPG	PPG
2003–04	Dallas	56	15	18.6	.494	**.306**	**.769**	2.6	2.1	.9	.2	8.5
2004–05	Dallas	60	17	23.5	.437	.200	.737	3.6	2.1	**1.4**	.2	9.1
2005–06	Dallas	62	29	28.5	.480	.211	.754	3.6	**2.8**	1.1	.2	10.2
2006–07	Indiana	45	4	17.8	.459	.231	.700	1.8	1.3	.6	.2	7.1
2007–08	Indiana	**74**	1	20.9	.430	.265	.698	2.9	1.9	1.1	.2	8.2
2008–09	Indiana	54	**43**	**31.5**	.451	.200	.721	**4.6**	2.1	1.1	**.5**	**13.6**
2009–10	Boston	51	4	18.4	**.498**	.214	.607	1.9	1.3	.5	.1	5.6
2010–11	Boston	49	0	19.1	.491	.190	.684	2.3	1.3	.8	.4	5.5
2011–12	Boston	38	0	12.7	.364	.000	.739	1.7	1.2	.6	.2	3.2
2012–13	Milwaukee	59	33	18.4	.376	.278	.741	2.5	1.1	.9	.2	5.5
Career		548	146	21.4	.451	.235	.721	2.8	1.8	.9	.3	7.9

=== NBA Playoffs ===
Year	Team	GP	GS	MPG	FG%	3P%	FT%	RPG	APG	SPG	BPG	PPG
2004	Dallas	5	**5**	**36.8**	.427	.143	.636	**6.2**	**3.0**	**2.0**	**.6**	**15.8**
2005	Dallas	11	0	15.0	.433	.167	.704	3.1	1.3	.5	.3	6.5
2006	Dallas	**20**	0	11.1	.446	.400	.762	1.1	1.3	.3	.1	3.4
2010	Boston	11	0	3.4	.385	**.500**	**1.000**	.9	.1	.0	.0	1.5
2012	Boston	15	0	6.1	**.579**	.000	.800	.7	.2	.1	.1	2.0
2013	Milwaukee	3	0	11.0	.545	.000	.000	1.3	1.3	.3	.0	4.0
Career		65	5	11.3	.449	.208	.733	1.7	1.0	.4	.1	4.3

=== College ===
Year	Team	GP	GS	MPG	FG%	3P%	FT%	RPG	APG	SPG	BPG	PPG
1999–2000	Auburn	17	0	12.7	.444	.200	.500	2.6	.5	.3	.1	4.5
2000–01	Auburn	32	31	30.4	**.522**	.229	.645	**7.0**	1.6	2.2	**.7**	15.7
2001–02	Auburn	28	25	28.8	.442	**.355**	.635	5.3	**4.1**	1.9	.2	11.6
2002–03	Auburn	**34**	**34**	**34.9**	.513	.306	**.673**	6.2	3.3	**2.3**	.2	**18.4**
Career		111	90	28.7	.496	.296	.646	5.6	2.6	1.9	.4	13.8

== Personal life ==
=== Tattoos ===
Daniels is noted for having several tattoos inscribed on different parts of his body. The tattoos range from a detailed map of Florida that covers his entire back, a caricature of a man blowing his head off with a shotgun on his lower right arm, and Chinese characters on his other arm which were intended to represent his initials, but translate to English as "healthy woman roof". Also, he has an entire Bible verse on his chest, which he used to read to his paralyzed grandmother.

=== Rap career ===
Outside basketball, Daniels also has a career in the hip-hop industry, going by his stage name, "Q6". One of his top singles is "Kome Here Nikki". Daniels has collaborated with many artists including Torrence "Lil Boosie" Hatch, Gucci Mane, and Trina.

=== Coaching career ===
In retirement, Daniels has also begun to coach. He is currently serving as an assistant men's basketball coach at his alma mater, Auburn University.
