= List of 2009–10 NBA season transactions =

This is a list of all personnel changes for the 2009 NBA off-season and 2009–10 NBA season.

== Retirement ==
Date	Name	Team(s) played (years)	Age	Notes	Ref.
n/a	Malik Rose	Charlotte Hornets (1996–1997); San Antonio Spurs (1997–2005); New York Knicks (2005–2009); Oklahoma City Thunder (2009)	34	Became an analyst for the Knicks.	
July 1	Alvin Williams	Portland Trail Blazers (1997–1998); Toronto Raptors (1998–2006); Los Angeles Clippers (2007)	34	Was hired as an assistant coach for the Raptors.	
September 3	Bruce Bowen	Miami Heat (1997, 2000–2001); Boston Celtics (1997–1999); Philadelphia 76ers (1999–2000); San Antonio Spurs (2001–2009)	38		
October 22	Mark Madsen	Los Angeles Lakers (2000–2003); Minnesota Timberwolves (2003–2009)	33	Became an assistant coach of the Utah Flash (D-League).	
October 23	Bobby Jackson	Denver Nuggets (1997–1998); Minnesota Timberwolves (1998–2000); Sacramento Kings (2000–2005, 2008–2009); Memphis Grizzlies (2005–2006); New Orleans / Oklahoma City Hornets (2006–2008); Houston Rockets (2008)	36	Became an assistant coach of the Kings.	
October 23	Tyronn Lue	Los Angeles Lakers (1998–2001); Washington Wizards (2001–2003); Orlando Magic (2003–2004, 2009); Houston Rockets (2004); Atlanta Hawks (2004–2008); Dallas Mavericks (2008); Milwaukee Bucks (2008–2009)	32	Became the director of basketball development of the Celtics.	
October 26	Donyell Marshall	Minnesota Timberwolves (1994–1995); Golden State Warriors (1995–2000); Utah Jazz (2000–2002); Chicago Bulls (2002–2003); Toronto Raptors (2003–2005); Cleveland Cavaliers (2005–2008); Seattle SuperSonics (2008); Philadelphia 76ers (2008–2009)	36	Became an analyst for the 76ers.	
November 5	Darrick Martin	Minnesota Timberwolves (1995, 2003–2004); Vancouver Grizzlies (1995–1996); Los Angeles Clippers (1996–1999, 2004–2005); Sacramento Kings (1999–2001); Dallas Mavericks (2001–2002); Toronto Raptors (2005–2008)	38	Named assistant director of player development of Timberwolves.	
November 11	Wally Szcerbiak	Minnesota Timberwolves (1999–2006); Boston Celtics (2006–2007); Seattle SuperSonics (2007–2008); Cleveland Cavaliers (2008–2009)	32	Became a broadcaster.	
March 6	Lindsey Hunter	Detroit Pistons (1993–2000, 2003–2008); Milwaukee Bucks (2000–2001); Los Angeles Lakers (2001–2002); Toronto Raptors (2002–2003); Chicago Bulls (2008–2010)	39	Became a player development assistant for the Bulls.	
March 14	Mateen Cleaves	Detroit Pistons (2000–2001); Sacramento Kings (2001–2003); Cleveland Cavaliers (2004); Seattle SuperSonics (2004–2006)	32	Became an analyst for the Pistons.	

== Front office movements ==
=== Head coach changes ===
Off-season
Date	Team	Interim coach	New head coach	Previous position	Ref.
April 15, 2009	Oklahoma City Thunder	**Scott Brooks**		Interim coach of the Thunder	
April 22, 2009	Washington Wizards	~~Ed Tapscott~~	Flip Saunders	Head coach of the Pistons	
May 9, 2009	Phoenix Suns	**Alvin Gentry**		Interim coach of the Suns	
May 11, 2009	Toronto Raptors	**Jay Triano**		Interim coach of the Raptors	
June 1, 2009	Philadelphia 76ers	~~Tony DiLeo~~	Eddie Jordan	Head coach of the Wizards	
June 10, 2009	Sacramento Kings	~~Kenny Natt~~	Paul Westphal	Ex. VP of basketball operations of the Mavericks	
July 9, 2009	Detroit Pistons	~~Michael Curry~~	John Kuester	Assistant coach of the Cavaliers	
August 10, 2009	Minnesota Timberwolves	~~Kevin McHale~~	Kurt Rambis	Assistant coach of the Lakers	
In-season
Date	Team	Outgoing coach	Interim coach	Reason	Ref.
November 12, 2009	New Orleans Hornets	~~Byron Scott~~	Jeff Bower	Fired after a 3–6 start	
November 29, 2009	New Jersey Nets	~~Lawrence Frank~~	Tom Barrise	Fired after a 0–16 start	
November 29, 2009	New Jersey Nets	~~Tom Barrise~~	Kiki Vandeweghe	Fired after a 0–16 start	
February 4, 2010	Los Angeles Clippers	~~Mike Dunleavy, Sr.~~	Kim Hughes	Relieved of coaching position	

Legend:

- ~~Strike~~ = fired or will not return for the 2009–10 season
- **Boldface** = New head coach
- **Bold italics** = Interim coach who was promoted to head coach

=== General manager changes ===
Off-season
Date	Team	Former GM	New GM	Previous position	Ref.
May 11, 2009	Golden State Warriors	~~Chris Mullin~~	**Larry Riley**	Assistant coach of the Warriors	
May 21, 2009	Chicago Bulls	~~John Paxson~~	**Gar Forman**	Director of player personnel of the Bulls	
In-season
Date	Team	Outgoing GM	New GM	Reason	Ref.
March 9, 2010	Los Angeles Clippers	~~Mike Dunleavy, Sr.~~	**Neil Olshey**	Fired	

Legend:

- ~~Strike~~ = fired or did not have contract renewed
- **Boldface** = New General Manager

== Player movement ==
The following is a list of player movement via free agency and trades.

=== Trades ===
June
June 9, 2009
To Philadelphia 76ers

- Jason Kapono
To Toronto Raptors

- Reggie Evans
June 23, 2009
To San Antonio Spurs

- Richard Jefferson
To Milwaukee Bucks

- Bruce Bowen
- Kurt Thomas
- Fabricio Oberto
To Milwaukee Bucks

- Amir Johnson
To Detroit Pistons

- Charlie Villanueva
- Fabricio Oberto
June 24, 2009
To Dallas Mavericks

- 24th pick in the 2009 NBA Draft
  (B. J. Mullens)
- 56th pick in the 2009 NBA Draft
  (Ahmad Nivins)
- 2010 second-round pick
To Portland Trail Blazers

- 22nd pick in the 2009 NBA draft (Víctor Claver)
To Minnesota Timberwolves

- Oleksiy Pecherov
- Darius Songaila
- Etan Thomas
- 5th pick in the 2009 NBA Draft
  (Ricky Rubio)
To Washington Wizards

- Randy Foye
- Mike Miller
June 25, 2009
To Cleveland Cavaliers

- Shaquille O'Neal
To Phoenix Suns

- Sasha Pavlović
- Ben Wallace
- 2010 conditional second-round pick
- Cash considerations
To New Jersey Nets

- Rafer Alston
- Tony Battie
- Courtney Lee
To Orlando Magic

- Ryan Anderson
- Vince Carter
To Atlanta Hawks

- Jamal Crawford
To Golden State Warriors

- Speedy Claxton
- Acie Law
June 26, 2009
To Cleveland Cavaliers

- Rights to Emir Preldžič
  (57th pick in 2009 NBA Draft)
To Phoenix Suns

- Cash considerations
July
July 9, 2009
Four-team trade
To Toronto Raptors

- Hedo Türkoğlu (From Orlando)
  (via sign and trade)
- Devean George (From Dallas)
- Antoine Wright (From Dallas)
To Orlando Magic

- Cash (From Dallas)
- Cash (From Toronto)
To Memphis Grizzlies

- Jerry Stackhouse (From Dallas)
- Second-round pick (From Toronto)
- Cash (From Toronto)
To Dallas Mavericks

- Shawn Marion (From Toronto)
  (via sign and trade)
- Kris Humphries (From Toronto)
- Nathan Jawai (From Toronto)
- Greg Buckner (From Memphis)
July 13, 2009
To Denver Nuggets

- Arron Afflalo
- Walter Sharpe
- Cash considerations
To Detroit Pistons

- 2011 second-round pick
July 14, 2009
To Atlanta Hawks

- Future second-round pick
- Cash and future considerations
To Houston Rockets

- Rights to David Andersen
  (36th pick in 2002 NBA draft)
July 17, 2009
To Los Angeles Clippers

- Quentin Richardson
To Memphis Grizzlies

- Zach Randolph
July 20, 2009
To Los Angeles Clippers

- Craig Smith
- Mark Madsen
- Sebastian Telfair
To Minnesota Timberwolves

- Quentin Richardson
July 27, 2009
To Minnesota Timberwolves

- Chucky Atkins
- Damien Wilkins
To Oklahoma City Thunder

- Etan Thomas
- 2010 second-round pick
- 2010 conditional second-round pick
July 28, 2009
To New Orleans Hornets

- Emeka Okafor
To Charlotte Bobcats

- Tyson Chandler
July 30, 2009
To Toronto Raptors

- Marco Belinelli
To Golden State Warriors

- Devean George
- Cash considerations
July 31, 2009
To Denver Nuggets

- Malik Allen
To Milwaukee Bucks

- Walter Sharpe
- Sonny Weems
- Cash considerations
August
August 7, 2009
To Denver Nuggets

- Future conditional second-round pick
To Memphis Grizzlies

- Steven Hunter
- 2010 conditional first-round pick
- Cash considerations
August 12, 2009
To Los Angeles Clippers

- Rasual Butler
- Cash considerations
To New Orleans Hornets

- 2016 conditional second-round pick
August 13, 2009
To Miami Heat

- Quentin Richardson
To Minnesota Timberwolves

- Mark Blount
August 18, 2009
To Milwaukee Bucks

- Carlos Delfino
  (via sign and trade)
- Roko Ukić
To Toronto Raptors

- Amir Johnson
- Sonny Weems
September
September 9, 2009
To Minnesota Timberwolves

- Antonio Daniels
- 2014 second-round pick
To New Orleans Hornets

- Bobby Brown
- Darius Songaila
September 22, 2009
To Houston Rockets

- Draft rights to Axel Hervelle
  (52nd pick in the 2005 NBA draft)
To Denver Nuggets

- James White
October
October 20, 2009
To Minnesota Timberwolves

- Nathan Jawai
To Dallas Mavericks

- 2012 second-round pick
November
November 16, 2009
To Golden State Warriors

- Raja Bell
- Vladimir Radmanovic
To Charlotte Bobcats

- Stephen Jackson
- Acie Law
December
December 22, 2009
To Utah Jazz

- Draft rights to Peter Fehse
  (48th pick in the 2002 NBA draft)
To Oklahoma City Thunder

- Matt Harpring
- Eric Maynor
December 29, 2009
To Phoenix Suns

- Jason Hart
To Minnesota Timberwolves

- Alando Tucker
- Second-round pick
- Cash
January
January 5, 2010
To New Jersey Nets

- Chris Quinn
- 2010 conditional second-round pick
- Cash
To Miami Heat

- Second-round pick in 2012
January 11, 2010
To Dallas Mavericks

- Eduardo Nájera
To New Jersey Nets

- Kris Humphries
- Shawne Williams
To Sacramento Kings

- Hilton Armstrong
To New Orleans Hornets

- 2016 conditional second-round pick
January 25, 2010
To New Orleans Hornets

- Aaron Gray
To Chicago Bulls

- Devin Brown
January 26, 2010
To New Orleans Hornets

- conditional second-round pick in 2014
To Los Angeles Clippers

- Bobby Brown
February
February 13, 2010
To Washington Wizards

- Quinton Ross
- Josh Howard
- James Singleton
- Drew Gooden
To Dallas Mavericks

- DeShawn Stevenson
- Caron Butler
- Brendan Haywood
- Cash
February 16, 2010
To Portland Trail Blazers

- Marcus Camby
To Los Angeles Clippers

- Travis Outlaw
- Steve Blake
- Cash
February 17, 2010
Three-team trade
To Cleveland Cavaliers

- Antawn Jamison (From Washington)
- Sebastian Telfair (From Los Angeles)
To Los Angeles Clippers

- Drew Gooden (From Washington)
To Washington Wizards

- Zydrunas Ilgauskas (From Cleveland)
- Al Thornton (From Los Angeles)
- 2010 first-round draft pick (From Cleveland)
- Rights to Emir Preldžič (From Cleveland)
  (57th pick in 2009 NBA Draft)
To New York Knicks

- Brian Cardinal
To Minnesota Timberwolves

- Darko Miličić

NBA Trade Deadline (February 18, 2010)
To Chicago Bulls: Hakim Warrick; Joe Alexander; Kurt Thomas	To Milwaukee Bucks: John Salmons; 2011 & 2012 second-round picks and option to switch 2010 first-round picks
To Chicago Bulls: Acie Law; Flip Murray; 2010 first-round draft pick	To Charlotte Bobcats: Tyrus Thomas
To Boston Celtics: Nate Robinson; Marcus Landry	To New York Knicks: Eddie House; J.R. Giddens; Bill Walker
To Milwaukee Bucks: Royal Ivey; Primož Brezec; 2010 second-round draft pick	To Philadelphia 76ers: Francisco Elson; Jodie Meeks
To Memphis Grizzlies: Ronnie Brewer	To Utah Jazz: 2010 protected first-round draft pick
Three-team trade
To New York Knicks: Tracy McGrady (From Houston); Sergio Rodríguez (From Sacramento)	To Sacramento Kings: Larry Hughes (From New York); Carl Landry (From Houston); Joey Dorsey (From Houston)
To Houston Rockets: Kevin Martin (From Sacramento); Jared Jeffries (From New York); Jordan Hill (From New York); Hilton Armstrong (From Sacramento); 2012 protected first-round pick (From New York); Right to exchange 2011 first-round picks with New York
To Charlotte Bobcats: Theo Ratliff	To San Antonio Spurs: 2016 protected second-round pick

Draft-night trades (June 25, 2009)
To Denver Nuggets: Rights to Ty Lawson (18th pick in 2009 NBA Draft)	To Minnesota Timberwolves: 2010 first-round pick
To Oklahoma City Thunder: Rights to B. J. Mullens (24th pick in 2009 NBA Draft)	To Dallas Mavericks: Rights to Rodrigue Beaubois (25th pick in 2009 NBA Draft); Future second-round pick
To New York Knicks: Rights to Toney Douglas (29th pick in 2009 NBA Draft)	To Los Angeles Lakers: Future second-round pick; Cash Considerations
To New York Knicks: Darko Miličić	To Memphis Grizzlies: Quentin Richardson; Cash considerations
To Portland Trail Blazers: Rights to Jeff Pendergraph (31st pick in 2009 NBA Draft)	To Sacramento Kings: Rights to Jon Brockman (38th pick in 2009 NBA Draft); Sergio Rodríguez; Cash considerations
To Houston Rockets: Rights to Jermaine Taylor (32nd pick in 2009 NBA Draft)	To Washington Wizards: Cash considerations
To Houston Rockets: Rights to Sergio Llull (34th pick in 2009 NBA Draft)	To Denver Nuggets: Cash considerations
To Miami Heat: Rights to Patrick Beverley (42nd pick in 2009 NBA Draft)	To Los Angeles Lakers: Future second-round pick; Cash considerations
To New Orleans Hornets: Rights to Marcus Thornton (43rd pick in 2009 NBA Draft)	To Miami Heat: Two future second-round picks
To Houston Rockets: Rights to Chase Budinger (44th pick in 2009 NBA Draft)	To Detroit Pistons: Future second-round pick; Cash considerations
To Dallas Mavericks: Rights to Nick Calathes (45th pick in 2009 NBA Draft)	To Minnesota Timberwolves: Future second-round pick
To Oklahoma City Thunder: Rights to Robert Vaden (54th pick in 2009 NBA Draft)	To Charlotte Bobcats: Cash considerations

=== Signed from free agency ===
Signed in the off-season
Player	Signed	New team	Former team
July
Trevor Ariza	July 8	Houston Rockets	Los Angeles Lakers
Ron Artest	July 8	Los Angeles Lakers	Houston Rockets
Rasheed Wallace	July 8	Boston Celtics	Detroit Pistons
Ben Gordon	July 8	Detroit Pistons	Chicago Bulls
Malik Hairston	July 8	San Antonio Spurs	Austin Toros (NBDL)
Marcus Haislip	July 8	San Antonio Spurs	Unicaja Málaga (Spain)
Quinton Ross	July 8	Dallas Mavericks	Memphis Grizzlies
Charlie Villanueva	July 8	Detroit Pistons	Milwaukee Bucks
Chris Andersen	July 8	Denver Nuggets	
Shannon Brown	July 8	Los Angeles Lakers	
Anderson Varejão	July 9	Cleveland Cavaliers	
Brandon Bass	July 10	Orlando Magic	Dallas Mavericks
Antonio McDyess	July 10	San Antonio Spurs	Detroit Pistons
Jason Kidd	July 11	Dallas Mavericks	
Jannero Pargo	July 13	Chicago Bulls	Olympiacos (Greece)
Anthony Parker	July 13	Cleveland Cavaliers	Toronto Raptors
Mike Bibby	July 13	Atlanta Hawks	
Marcin Gortat	July 13	Orlando Magic	
Grant Hill	July 13	Phoenix Suns	
Zaza Pachulia	July 13	Atlanta Hawks	
Dahntay Jones	July 14	Indiana Pacers	Denver Nuggets
Channing Frye	July 14	Phoenix Suns	Portland Trail Blazers
Ronnie Price	July 14	Utah Jazz	
Lindsey Hunter	July 15	Chicago Bulls	
Paul Millsap	July 16	Utah Jazz	
Joel Anthony	July 20	Miami Heat	
Jarrett Jack	July 21	Toronto Raptors	Indiana Pacers
Chris Wilcox	July 22	Detroit Pistons	New York Knicks
Jamaal Magloire	July 22	Miami Heat	
Josh McRoberts	July 22	Indiana Pacers	
Matt Barnes	July 23	Orlando Magic	Phoenix Suns
Ersan İlyasova	July 23	Milwaukee Bucks	Regal FC Barcelona (Spain)
Andre Miller	July 24	Portland Trail Blazers	Philadelphia 76ers
Jamario Moon	July 24	Cleveland Cavaliers	Miami Heat
Theo Ratliff	July 25	San Antonio Spurs	Philadelphia 76ers
Tim Thomas	July 28	Dallas Mavericks	Chicago Bulls
Earl Watson	July 28	Indiana Pacers	Oklahoma City Thunder
Ike Diogu	July 29	New Orleans Hornets	Sacramento Kings
Drew Gooden	July 30	Dallas Mavericks	San Antonio Spurs
Solomon Jones	July 30	Indiana Pacers	Atlanta Hawks
Rasho Nesterović	July 30	Toronto Raptors	Indiana Pacers
Hakim Warrick	July 31	Milwaukee Bucks	Memphis Grizzlies
Lamar Odom	July 31	Los Angeles Lakers	
August
Kevin Ollie	August 1	Oklahoma City Thunder	Minnesota Timberwolves
Sean May	August 3	Sacramento Kings	Charlotte Bobcats
Marcus Williams	August 7	Memphis Grizzlies	Quebradillas Pirates (Puerto Rico)
Shelden Williams	August 7	Boston Celtics	Minnesota Timberwolves
Marvin Williams	August 7	Atlanta Hawks	
Ryan Hollins	August 10	Minnesota Timberwolves	Dallas Mavericks
Glen Davis	August 10	Boston Celtics	
Royal Ivey	August 10	Philadelphia 76ers	
Fabricio Oberto	August 11	Washington Wizards	Detroit Pistons
Leon Powe	August 12	Cleveland Cavaliers	Boston Celtics
Ben Wallace	August 12	Detroit Pistons	Phoenix Suns
Primož Brezec	August 13	Philadelphia 76ers	Lottomatica Roma (Italy)
Anthony Carter	August 14	Denver Nuggets	
Jason Williams	August 19	Orlando Magic	Retirement
Joe Smith	August 25	Atlanta Hawks	Cleveland Cavaliers
Adonal Foyle	August 26	Orlando Magic	
Sean Marks	August 26	New Orleans Hornets	
Johan Petro	August 26	Denver Nuggets	
September
Marquis Daniels	September 1	Boston Celtics	Indiana Pacers
Jason Collins	September 2	Atlanta Hawks	Minnesota Timberwolves
Mikki Moore	September 2	Golden State Warriors	Boston Celtics
Pops Mensah-Bonsu	September 3	Houston Rockets	Toronto Raptors
C. J. Watson	September 9	Golden State Warriors	
Allen Iverson	September 10	Memphis Grizzlies	Detroit Pistons
Warren Carter	September 11	New York Knicks	BK Ventspils (Latvia)
Gabe Pruitt	September 11	New York Knicks	Boston Celtics
Ramon Sessions	September 11	Minnesota Timberwolves	Milwaukee Bucks
Steve Novak	September 11	Los Angeles Clippers	
James Singleton	September 14	Dallas Mavericks	
Rodney Carney	September 15	Philadelphia 76ers	Minnesota Timberwolves
Brian Skinner	September 16	Los Angeles Clippers	
Luther Head	September 17	Indiana Pacers	Miami Heat
Juwan Howard	September 17	Portland Trail Blazers	Charlotte Bobcats
Desmond Mason	September 17	Sacramento Kings	Oklahoma City Thunder
Sasha Pavlović	September 17	Minnesota Timberwolves	Phoenix Suns
Sun Yue	September 17	New York Knicks	Los Angeles Lakers
Morris Almond	September 18	Orlando Magic	Utah Jazz
Linton Johnson	September 18	Orlando Magic	Chicago Bulls
Aaron Gray	September 22	Chicago Bulls	
Raymond Felton	September 23	Charlotte Bobcats	
Keith Bogans	September 23	San Antonio Spurs	Milwaukee Bucks
Dwayne Jones	September 23	San Antonio Spurs	Idaho Stampede (NBDL)
David Lee	September 24	New York Knicks	
Ronald Murray	September 24	Charlotte Bobcats	Atlanta Hawks
Nate Robinson	September 25	New York Knicks	
Ime Udoka	September 25	Portland Trail Blazers	San Antonio Spurs
Signed in the regular season
Player	Date	New team	Former team
October
Carlos Arroyo	October 12	Miami Heat	Maccabi Tel Aviv (Israel)
Jarron Collins	October 26	Phoenix Suns	Portland Trail Blazers
November
Ime Udoka	November 4	Sacramento Kings	Portland Trail Blazers
Earl Boykins	November 11	Washington Wizards	Virtus Bologna (Italy)
Jamaal Tinsley	November 14	Memphis Grizzlies	Indiana Pacers
Pops Mensah-Bonsu	November 16	Toronto Raptors	Houston Rockets
Chris Hunter	November 20	Golden State Warriors	New York Knicks
Mike Wilks	November 26	Oklahoma City Thunder	Memphis Grizzlies
December
Allen Iverson	December 2	Philadelphia 76ers	Memphis Grizzlies
Jonathan Bender	December 13	New York Knicks	Retirement
Anthony Tolliver	December 17	Portland Trail Blazers	Idaho Stampede (NBDL)
Mike Harris	December 22	Houston Rockets	Rio Grande Valley Vipers (NBDL)
Shavlik Randolph	December 30	Portland Trail Blazers	Miami Heat
January
Rafer Alston	January 7	Miami Heat	New Jersey Nets
Lester Hudson	January 9	Memphis Grizzlies	Boston Celtics
Jerry Stackhouse	January 18	Milwaukee Bucks	Memphis Grizzlies
Sundiata Gaines	January 25	Utah Jazz	10-day Contracts from Utah
Will Conroy	January 28	Houston Rockets	Rio Grande Valley Vipers (NBDL)
Coby Karl	January 31	Golden State Warriors	Idaho Stampede (NBDL)
February
Mario West	February 1	Atlanta Hawks	10-day Contracts from Atlanta
Anthony Tolliver	February 6	Golden State Warriors	10-day Contracts from Golden State
March
Larry Hughes	March 13	Charlotte Bobcats	New York Knicks

==== 10-day contracts ====
Date	Team	Player	Second Contract
January 5	Utah Jazz	Sundiata Gaines	January 15
January 8	Portland Trail Blazers	Shavlik Randolph	
January 10	Golden State Warriors	Cartier Martin	January 20
January 12	Atlanta Hawks	Mario West	January 22
January 17	Golden State Warriors	Anthony Tolliver	January 27
January 22	Los Angeles Clippers	JamesOn Curry	
January 23	Cleveland Cavaliers	Cedric Jackson	February 2
February 4	Chicago Bulls	Chris Richard	February 15
February 4	New Orleans Hornets	Jason Hart	
February 8	Houston Rockets	Garrett Temple	February 18
February 22	Oklahoma City Thunder	Antonio Anderson	
February 24	Washington Wizards	Mike Harris	
February 26	Washington Wizards	Shaun Livingston	March 8
March 2	Golden State Warriors	Reggie Williams	March 12
March 3	Utah Jazz	Othyus Jeffers	
March 3	Sacramento Kings	Garrett Temple	
March 7	Washington Wizards	Alonzo Gee	
March 13	San Antonio Spurs	Garrett Temple	
March 24	Houston Rockets	Mike Harris	

*: Indicates the player getting signed to a second 10-day contract by the same team.

=== Released ===
==== Waived ====
Date	Team	Pos	Player
July
July 1	Detroit Pistons	C	Fabricio Oberto
July 10	Memphis Grizzlies	G	Jerry Stackhouse
July 13	Phoenix Suns	C	Ben Wallace
July 14	Chicago Bulls	F	Tim Thomas
July 17	Oklahoma City Thunder	G	Earl Watson
July 20	Chicago Bulls	G	Anthony Roberson
July 22	Indiana Pacers	G	Jamaal Tinsley
July 27	Golden State Warriors	F	Jermareo Davidson
July 29	Cleveland Cavaliers	G	Tarence Kinsey
July 30	Chicago Bulls	F	Linton Johnson
July 30	Chicago Bulls	G	DeMarcus Nelson
July 31	Los Angeles Lakers	G	Sun Yue
July 31	Milwaukee Bucks	G	Salim Stoudamire
July 31	Milwaukee Bucks	F	Bruce Bowen
July 31	New York Knicks	C	Mouhamed Sene
July 31	Los Angeles Clippers	G	Mike Taylor
July 31	Boston Celtics	G	Gabe Pruitt
August
August 21	Los Angeles Clippers	F	Mark Madsen
September
September 14	Dallas Mavericks	G	Greg Buckner
September 14	Phoenix Suns	G	Sasha Pavlović
September 22	Minnesota Timberwolves	G	Chucky Atkins
September 23	San Antonio Spurs	G	Jack McClinton
October
October 22	Portland Trail Blazers	G/F	Ime Udoka
October 28	Orlando Magic	F	Linton Johnson
October 28	Chicago Bulls	F	Derrick Byars
November
November 5	Memphis Grizzlies	G	Trey Gilder
November 5	Sacramento Kings	F	Desmond Mason
November 11	Washington Wizards	C	Paul Davis
November 12	Toronto Raptors	G	Quincy Douby
November 13	Houston Rockets	F	Pops Mensah-Bonsu
November 17	Memphis Grizzlies	G	Allen Iverson
November 25	Oklahoma City Thunder	F	Ryan Bowen
December
December 14	Miami Heat	F	Shavlik Randolph
December 22	Oklahoma City Thunder	G	Mike Wilks
December 22	Oklahoma City Thunder	G	Shaun Livingston
December 29	Phoenix Suns	G	Jason Hart
December 29	Portland Trail Blazers	F	Anthony Tolliver
January
January 4	Milwaukee Bucks	G	Roko Ukić
January 4	Golden State Warriors	F	Mikki Moore
January 5	New Jersey Nets	G	Rafer Alston
January 5	Toronto Raptors	F	Pops Mensah-Bonsu
January 5	Atlanta Hawks	F	Othello Hunter
January 6	Houston Rockets	F	Mike Harris
January 6	Portland Trail Blazers	F	Shavlik Randolph
January 6	Cleveland Cavaliers	G	Coby Karl
January 6	Boston Celtics	G	Lester Hudson
January 11	New Jersey Nets	F	Sean Williams
January 15	New Jersey Nets	F	Shawne Williams
January 22	Los Angeles Clippers	G	Kareem Rush
January 22	San Antonio Spurs	F	Marcus Haislip
January 26	Los Angeles Clippers	G	JamesOn Curry
February
February 6	Golden State Warriors	G	Speedy Claxton
February 16	Los Angeles Clippers	G	Ricky Davis
February 18	Sacramento Kings	F	Kenny Thomas
March
March 1	Indiana Pacers	G	Travis Diener
March 1	San Antonio Spurs	G–F	Michael Finley
March 3	Chicago Bulls	G	Lindsey Hunter

==== Renounced ====
Detroit Pistons

- Allen Iverson (to Grizzlies)
- Antonio McDyess (to Spurs)
- Wálter Herrmann

Memphis Grizzlies

- Chris Mihm
- Darius Miles
- Mike Wilks
- Juan Carlos Navarro

Portland Trail Blazers

- Raef LaFrentz
- Shavlik Randolph (to Heat)
- Michael Ruffin

==== Training camp cuts ====
All players here did not make the final roster

Atlanta Hawks	Boston Celtics	Charlotte Bobcats	Chicago Bulls	Cleveland Cavaliers
Aaron Miles; Frank Robinson; Mike Wilks; Juan Dixon; Mario West; Garret Siler; Courtney Sims	Mike Sweetney	Dontell Jefferson; Antonio Anderson	Curtis Stinson; Steven Hill; Chris Richard	Rob Kurz; Luke Nevill; Andre Barrett; Russell Robinson; Darryl Watkins
Dallas Mavericks	Denver Nuggets	Detroit Pistons	Golden State Warriors	Houston Rockets
Jake Voskuhl	Keith Brumbaugh; Dontaye Draper; James White; Kurt Looby	Maceo Baston; Deron Washington	Diamon Simpson; Shaun Pruitt	Romel Beck; Garrett Temple; Will Conroy; Brent Barry
Indiana Pacers	Los Angeles Lakers	Los Angeles Clippers	Memphis Grizzlies	Miami Heat
Lawrence Roberts; Demetris Nichols; Rod Benson	Michael Fey; Mickaël Gelabale; David Monds; Thomas Kelati; Tonny Gaffney	Taj Gray; Jerel McNeal; Anthony Roberson	Thomas Gardner; Leon Rodgers; Mike Taylor	Alade Aminu; Andre Brown; John Lucas III
Milwaukee Bucks	Minnesota Timberwolves	New Jersey Nets	New Orleans Hornets	New York Knicks
Dominic James; Mark Tyndale; Marcus Hubbard; Walter Sharpe	Jack McClinton; Alonzo Gee; Mustafa Shakur; Devin Green; Jared Reiner; Antonio Daniels	Will Blalock; Bennet Davis; Brian Hamiliton	Earl Barron; Larry Owens	Gabe Pruitt; Ron Howard; Sun Yue; Warren Carter; Joe Crawford; Chris Hunter
Oklahoma City Thunder	Orlando Magic	Philadelphia 76ers	Phoenix Suns	Portland Trail Blazers
Tre Kelley; Michael Ruffin; Mike Harris	Morris Almond	Rashad Jones-Jennings; Sean Singletary; Stromile Swift; Dionte Christmas; Brandon Bowman	Raymond Sykes; Dan Dickau; Carlos Powell	Jarron Collins; Ime Udoka
Sacramento Kings	San Antonio Spurs	Toronto Raptors	Utah Jazz	Washington Wizards
Lanny Smith; Melvin Ely	Dwayne Jones; Curtis Jerrells; Marcus Williams		Alexander Johnson; Spencer Nelson; Goran Suton; Paul Harris; Ronald Dupree	Vincent Grier

=== Going overseas ===
Player	Signed	New team	Former team
Wálter Herrmann	July 17, 2009	Caja Laboral (Spain)	Detroit Pistons
Jeremy Richardson	August 11, 2009	Aris BC (Greece)	Orlando Magic
Von Wafer	August 12, 2009	Olympiacos (Greece)	Houston Rockets
Linas Kleiza	August 18, 2009	Olympiacos (Greece)	Denver Nuggets
Fred Jones	August 19, 2009	Angelico Biella (Italy)	Los Angeles Clippers
Maurice Ager	August 22, 2009	Cajasol Sevilla (Spain)	New Jersey Nets
Alex Acker	August 22, 2009	Armani Jeans Milano (Italy)	Los Angeles Clippers
Tarence Kinsey	August 24, 2009	Fenerbahçe Ülker (Turkey)	Cleveland Cavaliers
Cedric Simmons	August 25, 2009	Peristeri BC (Greece)	Sacramento Kings
Mouhamed Sene	September 26, 2009	Hyères-Toulon (France)	New York Knicks
Cheikh Samb	October 2, 2009	Real Madrid (Spain)	New York Knicks
Damon Jones	October 15, 2009	Napoli (Italy)	Milwaukee Bucks
Dwayne Jones	October 16, 2009	Red Star (Serbia)	San Antonio Spurs
Mike Taylor	November 20, 2009	Red Star (Serbia)	Memphis Grizzlies
Marko Jarić	December 22, 2009	Real Madrid (Spain)	Memphis Grizzlies
Stephon Marbury	January 18, 2010	Shanxi Zhongyu (China)	Boston Celtics

== NBA draft ==
The 2009 NBA Draft was held on June 25, 2009, in New York City at Madison Square Garden.

=== Lottery selections ===
G	Guard	F	Forward	C	Center

Pick	Player	Pos	Team	School/club team
1	(United States) Blake Griffin	F	Los Angeles Clippers	Oklahoma (So.)
2	(Tanzania) Hasheem Thabeet	C	Memphis Grizzlies	Connecticut (Jr.)
3	(United States) James Harden	G	Oklahoma City Thunder	Arizona State (So.)
4	(United States) Tyreke Evans	G	Sacramento Kings	Memphis (Fr.)
5	(Spain) Ricky Rubio	G	Minnesota Timberwolves (from Wash)	DKV Joventut (Spain) 1990
6	(United States) Jonny Flynn	G	Minnesota Timberwolves	Syracuse (So.)
7	(United States) Stephen Curry	G	Golden State Warriors	Davidson (Jr.)
8	(United States) Jordan Hill	F	New York Knicks	Arizona (Jr.)
9	(United States) DeMar DeRozan	G	Toronto Raptors	USC (Fr.)
10	(United States) Brandon Jennings	G	Milwaukee Bucks	Lottomatica Roma (Italy) 1989
11	(United States) Terrence Williams	F	New Jersey Nets	Louisville (Sr.)
12	(United States) Gerald Henderson	G	Charlotte Bobcats	Duke (Jr.)
13	(United States) Tyler Hansbrough	F	Indiana Pacers	North Carolina (Sr.)
14	(United States) Earl Clark	F	Phoenix Suns	Louisville (Jr.)

=== Undrafted free agent signings ===
Player	Signed	New team	Former team
Curtis Jerrells	September 23	San Antonio Spurs	Baylor Bears
Wesley Matthews	September 24	Utah Jazz	Marquette Golden Eagles
Paul Harris	September 24	Utah Jazz	Syracuse Orange
