= 2006–07 Seattle SuperSonics season =

NBA professional basketball team season

- Head coach: Bob Hill
- General manager: Rick Sund
- Owner: Clay Bennett
- Arena: KeyArena at Seattle Center

Results
- Record: 31–51 (.378)
- Place: Division: 5th (Northwest); Conference: 14th (Western)
- Playoff finish: Did not qualify
- Stats at Basketball Reference

Local media
- Television: KIRO-TV; KSTW; FSN Northwest
- Radio: KPTK

The 2006–07 Seattle SuperSonics season was the 40th season of the Seattle SuperSonics in the National Basketball Association (NBA). The team finished in 14th place in the Western Conference with a 31–51 record and could not reach the playoffs for a second consecutive season.

Ray Allen was selected to play in the 2007 NBA All-Star Game, but could not participate due to season-ending surgeries on both ankles. Following the season, he was traded to the Boston Celtics and Rashard Lewis was dealt to the Orlando Magic.

== Draft picks ==
Round	Pick	Player	Position	Nationality	College/club team
1	10	Mouhamed Sene	C	Senegal	Verviers-Pepinster
2	40	Denham Brown	SG	Canada	Connecticut
2	53	Yotam Halperin	SG	Israel	KK Union Olimpija

== Roster ==
2006–07 Seattle SuperSonics roster
Players

Pos.	No.	Player	Height	Weight	DOB	From
SG	34	Ray Allen	6 ft 5 in (1.96 m)	205 lb (93 kg)	1975-07-20	Connecticut
PF	44	Andre Brown	6 ft 9 in (2.06 m)	245 lb (111 kg)	1981-05-12	DePaul
C	4	Nick Collison	6 ft 10 in (2.08 m)	255 lb (116 kg)	1980-10-26	Kansas
C	21	Danny Fortson	6 ft 7 in (2.01 m)	260 lb (118 kg)	1976-03-27	Cincinnati
SF	15	Mickaël Gelabale	6 ft 7 in (2.01 m)	215 lb (98 kg)	1983-05-22	France
SF	7	Rashard Lewis	6 ft 10 in (2.08 m)	215 lb (98 kg)	1979-08-08	Alief Elsik HS (TX)
PG	14	Randy Livingston	6 ft 4 in (1.93 m)	209 lb (95 kg)	1975-04-02	LSU
C	27	Johan Petro	7 ft 0 in (2.13 m)	247 lb (112 kg)	1986-01-27	France
PG	8	Luke Ridnour	6 ft 2 in (1.88 m)	175 lb (79 kg)	1981-02-13	Oregon
C	18	Mouhamed Sene	6 ft 11 in (2.11 m)	230 lb (104 kg)	1986-05-12	Senegal
C	31	Robert Swift	7 ft 1 in (2.16 m)	245 lb (111 kg)	1985-12-03	Bakersfield HS (CA)
PG	25	Earl Watson	6 ft 1 in (1.85 m)	185 lb (84 kg)	1979-06-12	UCLA
PF	54	Chris Wilcox	6 ft 10 in (2.08 m)	235 lb (107 kg)	1982-09-03	Maryland
SF	12	Damien Wilkins	6 ft 6 in (1.98 m)	225 lb (102 kg)	1980-01-11	Georgia
PG	29	Mike Wilks	5 ft 10 in (1.78 m)	180 lb (82 kg)	1979-05-07	Rice

Coaches
Head coach
- Bob Hill
Assistant(s)
- Gordon Chiesa
- Dwight Daub
- Ralph Lewis
- Walt Rock
- Detlef Schrempf
- Jack Sikma

Legend
- (DP) Unsigned draft pick
- (FA) Free agent
- (S) Suspended
- Injured

Roster
Updated: April 11, 2007

== Pre-season ==
2006 pre-season game log
Pre-season: 4–4 (home: 2–1; road: 2–3)

Game	Date	Team	Score	High points	High rebounds	High assists	Location Attendance	Record
1	October 11	@ Portland	W 99–89	Rashard Lewis (17)	Nick Collison (14)	Earl Watson (4)	Rose Garden; 14,073	1–0
2	October 12	@ L. A. Lakers	L 101–104	Nick Collison (20)	Robert Swift (8)	Earl Watson (4)	Honda Center; 11,659	1–1
3	October 15	@ Chicago	L 105–110 (OT)	Ray Allen (22)	Chris Wilcox (12)	Earl Watson (8)	Allen Fieldhouse; 12,758	1–2
4	October 20	Portland	L 95–103	Ray Allen (16)	Robert Swift (6)	Luke Ridnour (6)	KeyArena; 14,061	1–3
5	October 21	@ L. A. Clippers	L 82–86	Ray Allen (19)	Rashard Lewis, Nick Collison (9)	Earl Watson (6)	Staples Center; 14,089	1–4
6	October 23	@ Phoenix	W 108–102	Ray Allen (25)	Nick Collison (9)	Luke Ridnour (6)	US Airways Center; 18,422	2–4
7	October 25	Sacramento	W 103–88	Rashard Lewis (16)	Nick Collison (6)	Luke Ridnour (8)	KeyArena; 11,887	3–4
8	October 26	Golden State	W 111–107 (OT)	Nick Collison (19)	Nick Collison (12)	Luke Ridnour (12)	Spokane Arena; 4,860	4–4

2006–07 season schedule

== Regular season ==
=== Standings ===
Northwest Division	W	L	PCT	GB	Home	Road	Div
y-Utah Jazz	51	31	.634	-	31–10	20–21	10–6
x-Denver Nuggets	45	37	.549	6	23–18	22–19	9–7
Portland Trail Blazers	32	50	.390	19	18–23	14–27	7–9
Minnesota Timberwolves	32	50	.390	19	20–21	12–29	6–10
Seattle SuperSonics	31	51	.378	20	20–21	11–30	8–8

#	Western Conference				
#	Team	W	L	PCT	GB
1	z-Dallas Mavericks	67	15	.817	-
2	y-Phoenix Suns	61	21	.744	6
3	x-San Antonio Spurs	58	24	.707	9
4	y-Utah Jazz	51	31	.622	16
5	x-Houston Rockets	52	30	.634	15
6	x-Denver Nuggets	45	37	.549	22
7	x-Los Angeles Lakers	42	40	.512	25
8	x-Golden State Warriors	42	40	.512	25
9	Los Angeles Clippers	40	42	.488	27
10	New Orleans/Oklahoma City Hornets	39	43	.476	28
11	Sacramento Kings	33	49	.402	34
12	Portland Trail Blazers	32	50	.390	35
13	Minnesota Timberwolves	32	50	.390	35
14	Seattle SuperSonics	31	51	.378	36
15	Memphis Grizzlies	22	60	.268	45

=== Game log ===
2006–07 game log
Total: 31–51 (Home: 20–21; Road: 11–30)
November: 6–10 (home: 2–6; road: 4–4)

Game	Date	Team	Score	High points	High rebounds	High assists	Location Attendance	Record
1	November 1	Portland	L 106–110	Rashard Lewis (25)	Rashard Lewis (8)	Luke Ridnour (13)	KeyArena; 17,072	0–1
2	November 3	@ L. A. Lakers	L 112–118	Ray Allen (30)	Chris Wilcox (12)	Earl Watson (7)	Staples Center; 18,997	0–2
3	November 5	L. A. Lakers	W 117–101	Ray Allen (32)	Chris Wilcox (8)	Luke Ridnour (7)	KeyArena; 17,072	1–2
4	November 7	@ Miami	L 87–90	Rashard Lewis (23)	Nick Collison (10)	Earl Watson (6)	American Airlines Arena; 19,600	1–3
5	November 8	@ Orlando	L 87–88	Ray Allen (21)	Danny Fortson (8)	Luke Ridnour (6)	Amway Arena; 16,312	1–4
6	November 10	@ Charlotte	W 99–85	Ray Allen (26)	Nick Collison (15)	Luke Ridnour (7)	Charlotte Bobcats Arena; 13,515	2–4
7	November 11	@ Atlanta	W 113–112 (OT)	Ray Allen (33)	Chris Wilcox (15)	Luke Ridnour (5)	Philips Arena; 19,309	3–4
8	November 13	@ New Jersey	W 119–113	Luke Ridnour (32)	Rashard Lewis (11)	Luke Ridnour, Earl Watson (7)	Continental Airlines Arena; 14,392	4–4
9	November 15	Philadelphia	L 90–96	Rashard Lewis (25)	Rashard Lewis, Chris Wilcox (15)	Luke Ridnour (7)	KeyArena; 14,936	4–5
10	November 17	Utah	L 109–118	Ray Allen (32)	Chris Wilcox (11)	Luke Ridnour (7)	KeyArena; 15,513	4–6
11	November 18	@ Golden State	L 95–107	Ray Allen (34)	Ray Allen (11)	Earl Watson (7)	Oracle Arena; 17,205	4–7
12	November 20	New Jersey	W 99–87	Ray Allen (29)	Ray Allen (9)	Ray Allen, Luke Ridnour (5)	KeyArena; 14,621	5–7
13	November 22	@ L. A. Clippers	W 95–85	Rashard Lewis (35)	Nick Collison, Rashard Lewis (13)	Luke Ridnour (9)	Staples Center; 16,290	6–7
14	November 24	Sacramento	L 100–109	Rashard Lewis (26)	Chris Wilcox (13)	Luke Ridnour (8)	KeyArena; 16,757	6–8
15	November 26	San Antonio	L 78–98	Ray Allen (21)	Johan Petro (9)	Chris Wilcox (5)	KeyArena; 15,483	6–9
16	November 29	Orlando	L 84–94	Ray Allen (21)	Nick Collison (9)	Ray Allen (5)	KeyArena; 14,232	6–10

December : 7–9 (home: 7–1; road: 0–8)

Game	Date	Team	Score	High points	High rebounds	High assists	Location Attendance	Record
17	December 1	Indiana	W 105–103	Nick Collison (21)	Rashard Lewis (9)	Luke Ridnour (6)	KeyArena; 14,413	7–10
18	December 2	@ Utah	L 107–109	Ray Allen (33)	Rashard Lewis (8)	Luke Ridnour (10)	EnergySolutions Arena; 19,790	7–11
19	December 5	Atlanta	W 102–87	Rashard Lewis (29)	Nick Collison, Chris Wilcox (9)	Luke Ridnour (6)	KeyArena; 14,391	8–11
20	December 8	New Orleans/Oklahoma City	W 94–74	Chris Wilcox (19)	Nick Collison, Chris Wilcox (8)	Earl Watson (7)	KeyArena; 15,913	9–11
21	December 10	Golden State	W 117–115	Luke Ridnour (26)	Damien Wilkins (9)	Luke Ridnour (9)	KeyArena; 16,138	10–11
22	December 12	@ Milwaukee	L 93–94	Rashard Lewis (26)	Johan Petro (9)	Luke Ridnour (8)	Bradley Center; 13,374	10–12
23	December 13	@ Chicago	L 84–99	Rashard Lewis (18)	Rashard Lewis (13)	Damien Wilkins (7)	United Center; 21,812	10–13
24	December 15	@ Cleveland	L 84–106	Chris Wilcox (20)	Nick Collison (12)	Earl Watson (6)	Quicken Loans Arena; 20,562	10–14
25	December 17	@ Detroit	L 93–97	Rashard Lewis (25)	Rashard Lewis (11)	Rashard Lewis, Luke Ridnour (5)	The Palace of Auburn Hills; 22,076	10–15
26	December 18	@ Memphis	L 126–134 (2OT)	Rashard Lewis (36)	Rashard Lewis (14)	Luke Ridnour (10)	FedExForum; 12,423	10–16
27	December 20	Dallas	L 95–103	Luke Ridnour (21)	Chris Wilcox (9)	Luke Ridnour (9)	KeyArena; 16,867	10–17
28	December 23	Toronto	W 110–97	Ray Allen (28)	forston, Mickaël Gelabale (9)	Luke Ridnour (6)	KeyArena; 14,611	11–17
29	December 26	New Orleans/Oklahoma City	W 102–94	Luke Ridnour (27)	Chris Wilcox (10)	Luke Ridnour (9)	KeyArena; 15,319	12–17
30	December 28	@ Denver	L 98–112	Damien Wilkins (26)	Chris Wilcox (7)	Earl Watson (7)	Pepsi Center; 17,400	12–18
31	December 29	@ Minnesota	L 82–101	Ray Allen (14)	Nick Collison, Chris Wilcox (7)	Ray Allen, Luke Ridnour (4)	Target Center; 19,356	12–19
32	December 31	Boston	W 101–95	Chris Wilcox (24)	Luke Ridnour (11)	Luke Ridnour (3)	KeyArena; 15,557	13–19

January : 4–10 (home: 4–4; road: 0–6)

Game	Date	Team	Score	High points	High rebounds	High assists	Location Attendance	Record
33	January 2	@ Dallas	L 88–112	Ray Allen (27)	Nick Collison (7)	Earl Watson (6)	American Airlines Center; 20,245	13–20
34	January 3	@ Houston	L 96–103	Ray Allen (32)	Nick Collison (7)	Luke Ridnour (8)	Toyota Center; 11,133	13–21
35	January 5	New York	L 93–111	Chris Wilcox (13)	Nick Collison, Chris Wilcox (6)	Earl Watson (11)	KeyArena; 16,841	13–22
36	January 6	@ Golden State	L 104–108	Ray Allen (38)	Nick Collison (10)	Earl Watson (11)	Oracle Arena; 17,007	13–23
37	January 9	@ Phoenix	L 102–113	Nick Collison (29)	Nick Collison (21)	Ray Allen, Earl Watson (9)	US Airways Center; 18,422	13–24
38	January 10	Miami	L 103–107	Ray Allen (29)	Chris Wilcox (13)	Earl Watson (11)	KeyArena; 15,676	13–25
39	January 12	Utah	W 122–114 (OT)	Ray Allen (54)	Nick Collison (13)	Earl Watson (16)	KeyArena; 15,391	14–25
40	January 16	Cleveland	W 101–96	Ray Allen (22)	Nick Collison, Chris Wilcox (12)	Ray Allen (11)	KeyArena; 15,619	15–25
41	January 19	Milwaukee	W 99–72	Ray Allen (21)	Nick Collison (16)	Earl Watson (7)	KeyArena; 16,249	16–25
42	January 23	Denver	L 112–117	Ray Allen (44)	Chris Wilcox (12)	Earl Watson (7)	KeyArena; 17,072	16–26
43	January 26	Minnesota	W 102–100	Ray Allen (36)	Nick Collison (12)	Earl Watson (10)	KeyArena; 16,610	17–26
44	January 28	L. A. Clippers	L 76–98	Ray Allen (15)	Johan Petro (7)	Earl Watson (5)	KeyArena; 16,195	17–27
45	January 30	@ Dallas	L 102–122	Ray Allen (35)	Nick Collison (9)	Ray Allen (7)	American Airlines Center; 20,326	17–28
46	January 31	@ Houston	L 102–112	Ray Allen (36)	Nick Collison (17)	Earl Watson (8)	Toyota Center; 11,908	17–29

February : 5–7 (home: 3–2; road: 2–5)

Game	Date	Team	Score	High points	High rebounds	High assists	Location Attendance	Record
47	February 2	Chicago	L 101–107	Ray Allen (29)	Nick Collison (12)	Earl Watson (12)	KeyArena; 16,291	17–30
48	February 5	@ Washington	L 108–118	Ray Allen (29)	Chris Wilcox (10)	Earl Watson (10)	Verizon Center; 15,332	17–31
49	February 7	@ Indiana	W 103–102	Ray Allen (33)	Nick Collison (10)	Ray Allen (9)	Conseco Fieldhouse; 12,923	18–31
50	February 10	Sacramento	L 93–114	Ray Allen (29)	Chris Wilcox (11)	Earl Watson (6)	KeyArena; 17,072	18–32
51	February 11	@ Sacramento	W 114–103	Ray Allen, Chris Wilcox (25)	Rashard Lewis (10)	Luke Ridnour (5)	ARCO Arena; 17,317	19–32
52	February 14	Phoenix	W 114–90	Ray Allen (31)	Nick Collison (15)	Earl Watson (7)	KeyArena; 16,809	20–32
53	February 20	Memphis	W 121–105	Rashard Lewis (34)	Chris Wilcox (15)	Luke Ridnour (12)	KeyArena; 16,006	21–32
54	February 23	@ New Orleans/Oklahoma City	L 97–98	Ray Allen (32)	Rashard Lewis (12)	Ray Allen (6)	New Orleans Arena; 17,961	21–33
55	February 24	@ San Antonio	L 71–102	Ray Allen (12)	Nick Collison (7)	Ray Allen, Rashard Lewis (3)	AT&T Center; 18,797	21–34
56	February 26	Portland	W 97–73	Rashard Lewis (29)	Ray Allen, Nick Collison (10)	Luke Ridnour (8)	KeyArena; 16,538	22–34
57	February 28	@ L. A. Clippers	L 91–96	Rashard Lewis (21)	Nick Collison (12)	Luke Ridnour (7)	Staples Center; 19,317	22–35

March : 8–7 (home: 4–4; road: 4–3)

Game	Date	Team	Score	High points	High rebounds	High assists	Location Attendance	Record
58	March 1	L. A. Clippers	W 77–75	Rashard Lewis (31)	Chris Wilcox (13)	Rashard Lewis (5)	KeyArena; 14,601	23–35
59	March 4	Charlotte	W 96–89	Ray Allen (34)	Nick Collison (10)	Earl Watson (10)	KeyArena; 15,574	24–35
60	March 6	@ New York	W 100–99	Ray Allen (29)	Ray Allen, Chris Wilcox (8)	Earl Watson (9)	Madison Square Garden; 18,530	25–35
61	March 7	@ Philadelphia	L 89–92	Ray Allen (29)	Nick Collison (11)	Earl Watson (9)	Wachovia Center; 12,902	25–36
62	March 9	@ Boston	L 103–118	Ray Allen (22)	Chris Wilcox (10)	Earl Watson (7)	TD Banknorth Garden; 18,435	25–37
63	March 11	@ Toronto	L 119–120 (OT)	Ray Allen (36)	Rashard Lewis, Johan Petro (13)	Earl Watson (7)	Air Canada Centre; 19,800	25–38
64	March 13	Detroit	L 97–101	Ray Allen (27)	Johan Petro (9)	Earl Watson (7)	KeyArena; 15,960	25–39
65	March 17	Golden State	L 98–99	Ray Allen (25)	Nick Collison (18)	Luke Ridnour, Earl Watson (4)	KeyArena; 15,742	25–40
66	March 18	@ Portland	W 95–77	Rashard Lewis (27)	Rashard Lewis (12)	Earl Watson (8)	Rose Garden; 17,215	26–40
67	March 21	Washington	L 106–108	Chris Wilcox (27)	Chris Wilcox (22)	Luke Ridnour, Earl Watson (5)	KeyArena; 15,498	26–41
68	March 23	Minnesota	W 85–82	Rashard Lewis (22)	Chris Wilcox (12)	Earl Watson (7)	KeyArena; 16,794	27–41
69	March 25	San Antonio	L 79–120	Luke Ridnour (16)	Chris Wilcox (9)	Luke Ridnour (4)	KeyArena; 16,409	27–42
70	March 27	@ Minnesota	W 114–106	Rashard Lewis (35)	Chris Wilcox (9)	Three players (4)	Target Center; 15,120	28–42
71	March 28	@ Denver	W 100–97	Rashard Lewis (33)	Nick Collison (13)	Earl Watson (10)	Pepsi Center; 16,847	29–42
72	March 30	Memphis	W 120–93	Nick Collison, Johan Petro (22)	Nick Collison (12)	Luke Ridnour (12)	KeyArena; 16,469	30–42

April : 1–9 (home: 0–4; road: 1–5)

Game	Date	Team	Score	High points	High rebounds	High assists	Location Attendance	Record
73	April 1	Denver	L 103–114	Earl Watson (28)	Rashard Lewis (9)	Luke Ridnour (8)	KeyArena; 16,659	30–43
74	April 3	@ San Antonio	L 91–110	Chris Wilcox (20)	Nick Collison, Luke Ridnour (4)	Earl Watson, Mike Wilks (4)	AT&T Center; 18,583	30–44
75	April 4	@ New Orleans/Oklahoma City	L 92–101 (OT)	Rashard Lewis (27)	Rashard Lewis (10)	Luke Ridnour (5)	Ford Center; 17,021	30–45
76	April 6	L. A. Lakers	L 109–112	Chris Wilcox (32)	Chris Wilcox (18)	Earl Watson (8)	KeyArena; 17,072	30–46
77	April 7	@ Utah	W 106–103	Rashard Lewis (35)	Rashard Lewis (8)	Earl Watson (9)	EnergySolutions Arena; 19,911	31–46
78	April 9	Houston	L 90–95	Rashard Lewis (20)	Nick Collison (13)	Mike Wilks (8)	KeyArena; 16,004	31–47
79	April 11	@ Phoenix	L 91–109	Rashard Lewis (30)	Chris Wilcox (12)	Mike Wilks (6)	US Airways Center; 18,422	31–48
80	April 14	@ Portland	L 102–108	Rashard Lewis (29)	Chris Wilcox (11)	wlks (11)	KeyArena; 19,980	31–49
81	April 15	@ L. A. Lakers	L 98–109	Rashard Lewis (24)	Chris Wilcox (10)	Mike Wilks (8)	Staples Center; 18,997	31–50
82	April 18	Dallas	L 75–106	Rashard Lewis (14)	Mouhamed Sene (7)	Randy Livingston (4)	KeyArena; 16,117	31–51

2006–07 season schedule

== Player statistics ==
Legend
GP	Games played	GS	Games started	MPG	Minutes per game
FG%	Field-goal percentage	3P%	3-point field-goal percentage	FT%	Free-throw percentage
RPG	Rebounds per game	APG	Assists per game	SPG	Steals per game
BPG	Blocks per game	PPG	Points per game

Player	GP	GS	MPG	FG%	3P%	FT%	RPG	APG	SPG	BPG	PPG
Ray Allen	55	55	40.3	.438	.372	.903	4.5	4.1	1.5	.2	26.4
Andre Brown ^{[1]}	38	0	7.1	.568	.000	.600	1.9	.1	.2	.1	2.4
Nick Collison	82	56	29.0	.500	.000	.774	8.1	1.0	.6	.8	9.6
Desmon Farmer ^{[1]}	8	0	4.0	.333	.250	1.000	.1	1.1	.1	.0	1.6
Danny Fortson	14	6	11.3	.500	.000	.769	3.1	.1	.1	.0	2.9
Mickaël Gelabale	70	14	17.7	.462	.234	.805	2.5	.8	.3	.3	4.6
Andreas Glyniadakis ^{[1]}	13	4	6.2	.471		.500	.6	.1	.0	.0	1.3
Rashard Lewis	60	60	39.1	.461	.390	.841	6.6	2.4	1.1	.7	22.4
Randy Livingston ^{[1]}	4	0	6.5	.000			.3	1.0	.0	.0	.0
Johan Petro	81	13	18.6	.516		.649	4.1	.6	.5	.6	6.2
Luke Ridnour	71	58	29.5	.433	.353	.805	2.3	5.2	1.2	.3	11.0
Mouhamed Sene	28	3	6.0	.367		.586	1.6	.0	.1	.4	1.9
Earl Watson	77	25	27.9	.383	.329	.735	2.4	5.7	1.3	.3	9.4
Chris Wilcox	82	81	31.5	.529	.000	.684	7.7	1.0	.9	.5	13.5
Damien Wilkins	82	31	24.8	.435	.410	.882	2.8	1.9	1.1	.2	8.8
Mike Wilks	47	4	11.4	.468	.333	.786	1.1	1.7	.3	.1	3.6

- ^{1} Statistics with the Seattle SuperSonics.

== Awards ==
- Ray Allen made his 7th All-Star appearance at the 2007 NBA All-Star Game.

== Transactions ==
=== Overview ===
Players Added

Via draft

- Mouhamed Sene

Via free agency

- Andre Brown ^{[a]}
- Desmon Farmer ^{[b]}
- Andreas Glyniadakis ^{[b]}
- Randy Livingston
Players Lost

Via trade

- Mikki Moore

- ^{b} Signed for the remainder of the season after two 10-day contracts.
- ^{b} Later waived.

=== Trades ===
July 27, 2006	To Seattle SuperSonics 2009 second round pick	To New Jersey Nets Mikki Moore
