= Earl Watson =

American basketball coach (born 1979)

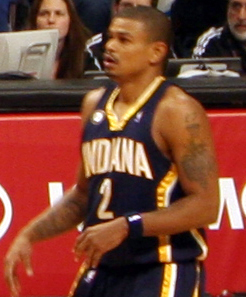
- Watson with the Indiana Pacers in 2009

San Diego Toreros
- Title: Assistant coach
- League: West Coast Conference

Personal information
- Born: June 12, 1979 (age 47) Kansas City, Kansas, U.S.
- Listed height: 6 ft 1 in (1.85 m)
- Listed weight: 199 lb (90 kg)

Career information
- High school: Washington (Kansas City, Kansas)
- College: UCLA (1997–2001)
- NBA draft: 2001: 2nd round, 39th overall pick
- Drafted by: Seattle SuperSonics
- Playing career: 2001–2014
- Position: Point guard
- Number: 25, 8, 2, 11, 17
- Coaching career: 2014–present

Career history

Playing
- 2001–2002: Seattle SuperSonics
- 2002–2005: Memphis Grizzlies
- 2005–2006: Denver Nuggets
- 2006–2009: Seattle SuperSonics / Oklahoma City Thunder
- 2009–2010: Indiana Pacers
- 2010–2013: Utah Jazz
- 2013–2014: Portland Trail Blazers

Career highlights
- First-team All-Pac-10 (2001); Pac-10 All-Freshman Team (1998)

Career statistics
- Points: 5,593 (6.4 ppg)
- Assists: 3,871 (4.4 apg)
- Steals: 873 (1.0 spg)
- Stats at NBA.com
- Stats at Basketball Reference

Earl Joseph Watson Jr. (born June 12, 1979) is an American professional basketball coach and former player, who serves as an assistant coach for the San Diego Toreros. He played college basketball for the UCLA Bruins, where he was a four-year starter and named all-conference as a senior in the Pac-10 (now known as the Pac-12). Watson was drafted by the Seattle SuperSonics in the second round of the 2001 NBA draft with the 39th overall selection. He played 13 seasons in the NBA with seven teams before becoming a coach in 2014. He was the head coach of the Phoenix Suns from 2016 to 2017.

== High school and college career ==
Watson is a graduate of Washington High School in Kansas City, Kansas. In his senior year of high school he averaged 23.4 points, 8.3 assists and 14 rebounds per game.

Watson was a starter in college at UCLA, at one point playing alongside future NBA All-Star Baron Davis. They were the first two freshmen to start at UCLA since the 1979 season. A four-year starter, Watson started the most consecutive games in the history of UCLA basketball. As a senior in 2000–01, he averaged 14.7 points (2nd on the team, 9th in the pac-10), 5.2 assists, (1st on the team, 2nd most in the Pac-10) 3.7 rebounds, 0.3 blocks, and 1.9 steals (most in the Pac-10, most on the team) per game. He earned first-team All-Pac-10 honors.

== Professional career ==
Watson was selected in the second round (39th overall) by the SuperSonics in the 2001 NBA draft. In the 2007–08 NBA season, Watson averaged 10.7 points and 6.8 assists with the Sonics. On February 6, 2008, Watson recorded his first-ever triple-double in a game against the Sacramento Kings. Watson logged 23 points, 10 rebounds and 10 assists in 32 minutes. It was Seattle's first triple-double since Ray Allen registered one on January 28, 2004, against the Los Angeles Lakers.

On July 17, 2009, Watson was waived by the Thunder. He signed a one-year deal with the Indiana Pacers on July 28, 2009.

He signed with the Utah Jazz on September 26, 2010.

On July 10, 2013, he signed with the Portland Trail Blazers.

Watson's final NBA game was played in Game 4 of the 2014 Western Conference Semi-Finals between the Trailblazers and the San Antonio Spurs on May 12, 2014. In his final game, Watson only played for a minute and half and recorded no stats. The TrailBlazers won the game 103 – 92 but this would be their only victory of the series, as they would go on to lose the series in 5 games to San Antonio. Watson retired as a player on October 2, 2014.

== NBA career statistics ==
Legend
GP	Games played	GS	Games started	MPG	Minutes per game
FG%	Field goal percentage	3P%	3-point field goal percentage	FT%	Free throw percentage
RPG	Rebounds per game	APG	Assists per game	SPG	Steals per game
BPG	Blocks per game	PPG	Points per game	**Bold**	Career high

=== Regular season ===
Year	Team	GP	GS	MPG	FG%	3P%	FT%	RPG	APG	SPG	BPG	PPG
2001–02	Seattle	64	0	15.1	.453	.364	.639	1.3	2.0	.9	.1	3.6
2002–03	Memphis	79	2	17.3	.435	.341	.721	2.1	2.8	1.1	.2	5.5
2003–04	Memphis	**81**	14	20.6	.371	.245	.652	2.2	5.0	1.1	.2	5.7
2004–05	Memphis	80	14	22.6	.426	.319	.659	2.1	4.5	1.0	.2	7.7
2005–06	Denver	46	10	21.2	.429	.395	.627	1.9	3.5	.8	.2	7.5
2005–06	Seattle	24	0	25.1	.432	**.420**	.731	**3.0**	5.4	**1.3**	.1	**11.5**
2006–07	Seattle	77	25	27.9	.383	.329	.735	2.4	5.7	**1.3**	.3	9.4
2007–08	Seattle	78	**73**	29.1	**.454**	.371	.766	2.9	**6.8**	.9	.1	10.7
2008–09	Oklahoma City	68	18	26.1	.384	.235	.755	2.7	5.8	.7	.2	6.6
2009–10	Indiana	79	52	**29.4**	.426	.288	.710	**3.0**	5.1	**1.3**	.2	7.8
2010–11	Utah	80	13	19.6	.410	.336	.671	2.3	3.5	.8	.2	4.3
2011–12	Utah	50	2	20.7	.338	.192	.674	2.4	4.3	1.1	**.4**	3.0
2012–13	Utah	48	4	17.3	.308	.179	.680	1.8	4.0	.8	.2	2.0
2013–14	Portland	24	0	6.7	.273	.286	**1.000**	.6	1.2	.2	.0	0.5
Career		878	227	22.2	.411	.324	.703	2.3	4.4	1.0	.2	6.4

=== Playoffs ===
Year	Team	GP	GS	MPG	FG%	3P%	FT%	RPG	APG	SPG	BPG	PPG
2004	Memphis	**4**	0	15.5	**.533**	.000	**1.000**	2.3	1.8	**1.3**	.0	**4.8**
2005	Memphis	**4**	0	**18.5**	.333	**.111**	**1.000**	**2.5**	**3.8**	.8	**.3**	**4.8**
2014	Portland	**4**	0	3.5	.000	.000	.000	.3	.3	.0	.0	0.0
Career		12	0	12.5	.400	.077	1.000	1.7	1.9	.7	.1	3.2

== Coaching career ==
On October 2, 2014, Watson was hired as an assistant coach by the Austin Spurs of the NBA D-League, effectively ending his 13-year playing career. He joined the Phoenix Suns as their new assistant coach on July 30, 2015. However, after a poor start to the 2015–16 season, the Suns fired coach Jeff Hornacek and replaced him with Watson as the interim head coach for the rest of the season. While Watson would make his coaching debut on February 2, 2016, at home against the Toronto Raptors, it wouldn't be until February 27, almost a month later, where he'd record his first win with the Suns at home against the Memphis Grizzlies, a team he had previously played under. He would then get his first two-game winning streak on the road as a coach with victories on March 4 against the Orlando Magic and March 6 against the Grizzlies, respectively. After starting out the season with only one victory in ten games for February, he'd end the season with an 8–15 record the rest of the way, including ending the season with a 3–1 stint.

On April 19, the Suns announced that they had agreed to a three-year deal with Watson due to the positive nature he had that was instilled upon the team after he was first hired, making him the full-time head coach of the team. At the time of his promotion to permanent head coach, Watson was the second-youngest head coach in the NBA (behind only Luke Walton), being 36 when he first started coaching. Watson also became the first former UCLA Bruins player to become a head coach in the NBA, as well as the first NBA head coach of Hispanic descent. During Watson's first full season as head coach, he continued to promote the same philosophical mindset he had for the Suns back when he first started coaching them, but he'd also adjust the team's focus to being more involved with defense first and then offense second.

Before the start of the 2017–18 season, Suns owner Robert Sarver had told sports agent Rich Paul of Klutch Sports, who represented Watson at the time, that he planned to fire Watson if the coach did not sever ties with Klutch. After the Suns got off to a 0–3 start, with two blowout losses (including the worst loss in franchise history and worst season opening performance in NBA history), Watson was fired on October 22, and replaced on an interim basis by associate head coach Jay Triano for the rest of the season. Watson later worked with the Junior Basketball Association in 2018 and then worked as a Pac-12 Network and NBA TV studio analyst from 2019 to 2021.

On August 2, 2021, Watson was hired by the Toronto Raptors as an assistant coach.

On September 17, 2024, Watson joined the San Diego Toreros as an assistant coach.

=== Head coaching record ===
Legend
Regular season	G	Games coached	W	Games won	L	Games lost	W–L %	Win–loss %
Playoffs	PG	Playoff games	PW	Playoff wins	PL	Playoff losses	PW–L %	Playoff win–loss %

Team	Year	G	W	L	W–L%	Finish	PG	PW	PL	PW–L%	Result
Phoenix	2015–16	33	9	24	.273	4th in Pacific	—	—	—	–	Missed playoffs
Phoenix	2016–17	82	24	58	.293	5th in Pacific	—	—	—	—	Missed playoffs
Phoenix	2017–18	3	0	3	.000	(fired)	—	—	—	—	—
Career		118	33	85	.280		0	0	0	–	

== Personal life ==
Watson's father, Earl, is African-American and his mother, Estella, is Mexican-American. Because his maternal grandparents were born in Mexico, Watson was eligible to play for the Mexico national basketball team. Watson has four brothers and one sister. He is also involved with the local Hispanic Chamber of Commerce in Arizona. One of his brothers, Dwayne, was a retired police officer who died due to blood clots in his legs that were dislodged during an altercation. The assailant, Tremaine Quinn, was sentenced to 36 months of probation for the action. That incident would be a major driving force for Earl to take up coaching in basketball. Watson founded the organization "Emagine" to positively impact the youth of his hometown Kansas City, Kansas.

On May 16, 2009, he married actress Jennifer Freeman. They have a daughter together Isabella Amora Watson. They separated in 2011.

In September 2018, Watson and Fox Sports 1 personality Joy Taylor announced that they were engaged. In January 2019, it was reported that the couple did purchased a $2.5 million-dollar home in Encino.

Watson has stated he takes coaching inspiration from UCLA all-time great John Wooden.

Watson is considered a supporter of the Amateur Athletic Union programs, saying that the right program and right people involved can lead towards more positive experiences for the people involved. He also stated that he likely would have never gotten a scholarship for UCLA if he didn't have the AAU around. He is part-owner of AAU program Earl Watson Elite. He also joined LaVar Ball's Junior Basketball Association committee.

Watson started Earl Watson Early Childhood Center, a preschool in his hometown of Kansas City.

Establishing 70 Earl Watson Elite travel teams on the west coast has helped Earl develop a strong connection in grassroots basketball. Becoming the first head coach in the NBA of Latino descent has allowed Earl to lead the way for diversity in leadership in sports along with receiving a multitude of other awards, including:

- 2019 UCLA Latino Alumnus of the Year
- NAHREP – National Association of Hispanic Real Estate Professions
- 2017 Vanguard Award
- NCLR – National Council of La Raza – Roberto Clemente Lifetime Achievement Award
- Establishing the Earl Watson Early Childhood Center in 2013
- 2006 Reasons to Believe Award
