= Mike Wilks (basketball) =

American basketball player and coach (born 1979)

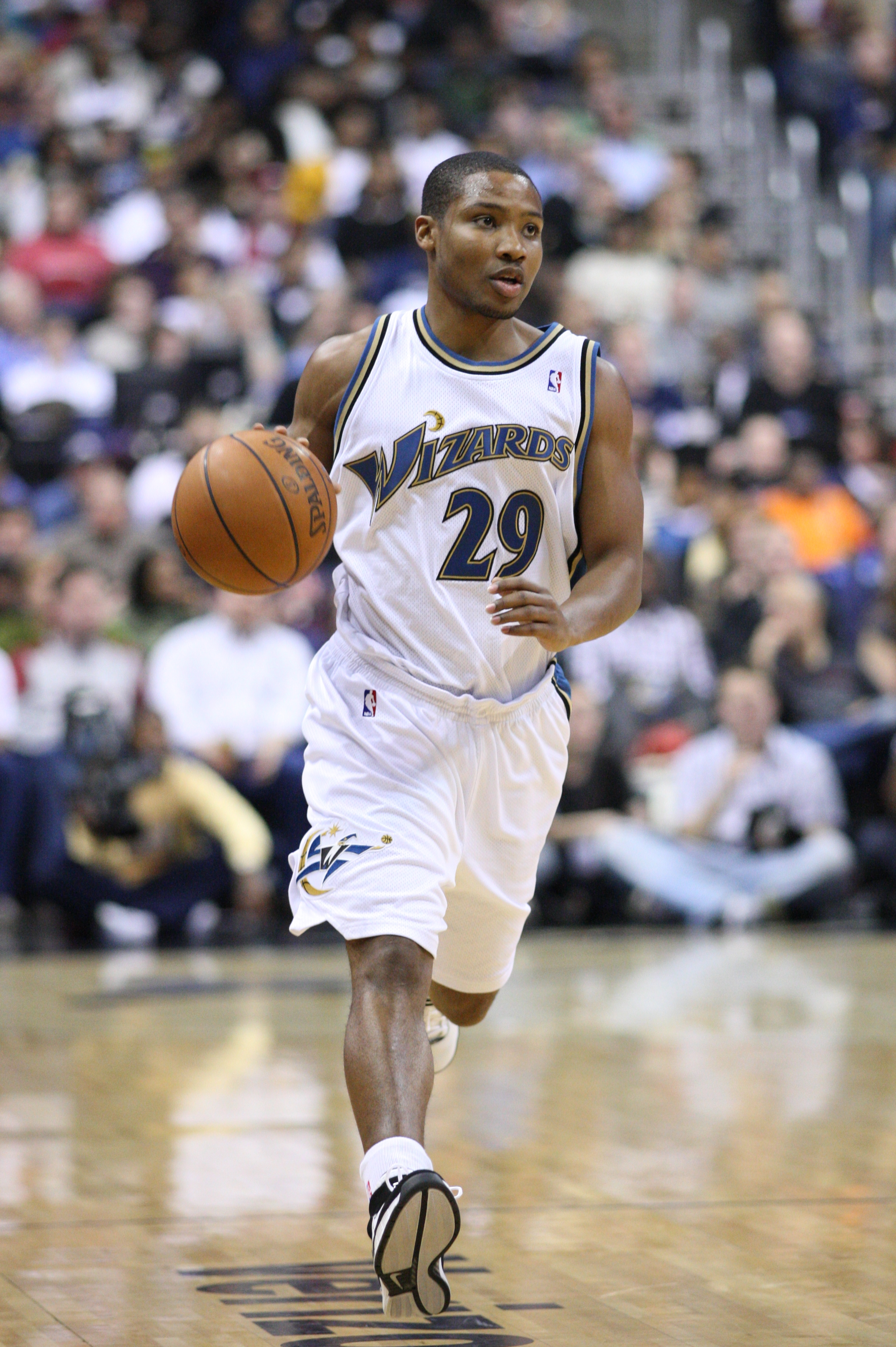
- Wilks with the Washington Wizards in 2007

Oklahoma City Thunder
- Title: Assistant coach
- League: NBA

Personal information
- Born: May 7, 1979 (age 47) Milwaukee, Wisconsin, U.S.
- Listed height: 5 ft 10 in (1.78 m)
- Listed weight: 180 lb (82 kg)

Career information
- High school: Rufus King (Milwaukee, Wisconsin)
- College: Rice (1997–2001)
- NBA draft: 2001: undrafted
- Playing career: 2001–2011
- Position: Point guard / shooting guard
- Number: 29, 11
- Coaching career: 2019–present

Career history

Playing
- 2001: Mobile Revelers
- 2001–2002: Huntsville Flight
- 2002–2003: Atlanta Hawks
- 2003: Minnesota Timberwolves
- 2003–2004: Houston Rockets
- 2004–2005: San Antonio Spurs
- 2005–2006: Cleveland Cavaliers
- 2006–2007: Seattle SuperSonics
- 2007: Denver Nuggets
- 2007: Washington Wizards
- 2008: Seattle SuperSonics
- 2008: Montepaschi Siena
- 2009: Memphis Grizzlies
- 2009: Oklahoma City Thunder
- 2010–2011: Asseco Prokom Gdynia

Coaching
- 2019–present: Oklahoma City Thunder (assistant)

Career highlights
- As player: Polish League champion (2011); Italian League champion (2008); Italian Supercup champion (2008); NBA champion (2005); NBADL Sportsmanship Award (2002); First-team All-WAC (2001); Wisconsin Mr. Basketball (1997); As assistant coach: NBA champion (2025)

Career NBA statistics
- Points: 591 (2.5 ppg)
- Assists: 271 (1.2 rpg)
- Rebounds: 228 (1.0 apg)
- Stats at NBA.com
- Stats at Basketball Reference

Michael Sharod Wilks Jr. (born May 7, 1979) is an American coach and former professional basketball player who currently serves as an assistant coach for the Oklahoma City Thunder of the National Basketball Association (NBA).

== College career ==
After graduating from Rufus King High School in Milwaukee, Wilks played four years (1997–2001) of college basketball at Rice University, where Mike majored in Economics. His senior year, Mike averaged 20.1 points, 4.9 rebounds and 3.0 assists per game, earning Western Athletic Conference Scholar Athlete honors.

== Professional career ==
Wilks began his professional career as an undrafted free agent. Mike wilks started his career in the Sacramento Kings Training camp, however he was waived before the season started. Wilks was drafted by the Mobile Revelers in Round 12 Pick 7 in the NBA D league draft. After Playing 6 games for the Revelers he moved to the Huntsville Flight where he finished out the season. As a rookie in the NBA Development League, Mike won the 2001–02 Sportsmanship Award while playing for the Huntsville Flight.

Wilks started for the 2002 season on the Milwaukee Bucks Training Camp roster. He was again waived before the start of the 2002–2003 regular season. He returned to the Huntsville Flight for the 2002–2003 d-league season. On December 24, 2002, he was signed to a contract by the Atlanta Hawks where he played 6 games before he was subsequently waived on January 7, 2003. He then returned on his first of 2 10-day contracts for the Atlanta Hawks where he then played another 9 games. After his time with the Atlanta Hawks came to a close Wilks signed with the Minnesota Timberwolves on a 10-day contract, which turned into a full contract in which he played 31 out of 32 of the final games for the team.

On September 8, 2003, Wilks signed with the Houston Rockets where he played 26 games in the season. 1 year later he did a sign and trade with the Rockets where he was traded with Eric Piatkowski and Adrian Griffin to the Chicago Bulls for Dikembe Mutombo, but was later waived by the Bulls. On 10/26/2004 Wilks signed with the San Antonio Spurs with whom he won a title in 2005, averaging 1.8 points per game in the regular season. Wilks then signed with the Cleveland Cavaliers Where he played 37 games. Near the 2006 deadline the Cavaliers traded Wilks and Cash to the Seattle SuperSonics for Flip Murray. Wilks also played the 2006–2007 season with the Seattle SuperSonics. He played 57 games over the 2 seasons for the Sonics.

Wilks signed for Training Camp with the Denver Nuggets. After being waived by the Nuggets in October 2007, Wilks was re-signed four days later after Chucky Atkins suffered an injury. Mike was waived again later in November and signed by the Washington Wizards in December 2007. On February 29, 2008, the Sonics signed Wilks to a 10-day contract. After the contract expired, he was not re-signed.

Wilks signed with the Orlando Magic on September 30, 2008. In the pre season game on October 26, 2008, Mike tore his ACL in his right knee and missed the whole regular season. Mike was traded to the Memphis Grizzlies on February 19, 2009. After leaving the Memphis Grizzlies. Wilks spent 2009 training camp with the Atlanta Hawks but was not signed for the season. Michael Wilks signed a contract with the Oklahoma City Thunder on November 26. He was waived by Oklahoma City on December 22, 2009, when the team acquired Eric Maynor. This was his second stint with the franchise.

Wilks' final NBA game was played on December 4, 2009, in a 87–105 loss to the Boston Celtics where he recorded 7 points and 2 assists while playing 21 minutes off the bench.

Wilks wore number 29 throughout his NBA career (with the exception of his stint with the Spurs, in which he wore 11), as a tribute to Milwaukee's 29th Street playground where he grew up playing the game.

On August 25, 2010, he signed a deal with Polish league champion Asseco Prokom Gdynia but was waived in January 2011.

In the 2011–2012 season Mike Wilks was brought in for Washington Wizards training camp but was cut before the regular season.

In October 2012, Wilks joined the Oklahoma City Thunder as a scout. On December 28, 2021, Wilks became the first former Thunder player to coach the Thunder as head coach Mark Daigneault entered health and safety protocols.

== NBA career statistics ==
Legend
GP	Games played	GS	Games started	MPG	Minutes per game
FG%	Field goal percentage	3P%	3-point field goal percentage	FT%	Free throw percentage
RPG	Rebounds per game	APG	Assists per game	SPG	Steals per game
BPG	Blocks per game	PPG	Points per game	**Bold**	Career high
†	Won an NBA championship

=== Regular season ===
Year	Team	GP	GS	MPG	FG%	3P%	FT%	RPG	APG	SPG	BPG	PPG
2002–03	Atlanta	15	**7**	**24.3**	.358	.353	.724	**2.7**	**2.8**	**1.1**	**.1**	**5.7**
2002–03	Minnesota	31	0	10.5	.313	.222	.889	1.0	1.6	.3	**.1**	2.0
2003–04	Houston	26	0	5.6	.472	.600	.833	.6	.7	.1	.0	1.9
2004–05†	San Antonio	**48**	0	5.8	.416	.313	.750	.5	.7	.3	.0	1.7
2005–06	Cleveland	37	0	6.6	.288	.143	.500	.7	.5	.2	.0	1.1
2005–06	Seattle	10	0	10.5	.387	.200	.655	1.2	1.4	.6	.0	4.4
2006–07	Seattle	47	4	11.4	.468	.333	.786	1.1	1.7	.3	**.1**	3.6
2007–08	Denver	8	0	15.3	.435	.400	**1.000**	1.5	.8	.6	.0	3.0
2007–08	Washington	4	0	11.0	.500	.500	.000	1.5	.8	.8	.0	1.3
2007–08	Seattle	3	0	7.3	**.556**	.000	**1.000**	.3	1.7	.3	.0	4.0
2009–10	Oklahoma City	4	0	14.8	.500	**.667**	.500	1.0	1.0	.0	.0	4.0
Career		233	11	9.6	.402	.321	.741	1.0	1.2	.4	.0	2.5

=== Playoffs ===
Year	Team	GP	GS	MPG	FG%	3P%	FT%	RPG	APG	SPG	BPG	PPG
2003	Minnesota	**4**	0	1.8	**.500**	**1.000**	.000	.0	.0	.0	.0	**.8**
2004	Houston	2	0	**2.5**	.000	.000	.000	.0	**.5**	.0	.0	.0
Career		6	0	2.0	.500	1.000	.000	.0	.2	.0	.0	.5
