= Mouhamed Sene =

Senegalese basketball player (born 1986)

Personal information
- Born: May 12, 1986 (age 40) Thiès, Senegal
- Listed height: 6 ft 11 in (2.11 m)
- Listed weight: 230 lb (104 kg)

Career information
- NBA draft: 2006: 1st round, 10th overall pick
- Drafted by: Seattle SuperSonics
- Playing career: 2005–2016
- Position: Center
- Number: 18

Career history
- 2005–2006: Verviers-Pepinster
- 2006–2009: Seattle SuperSonics / Oklahoma City Thunder
- 2007–2008: →Idaho Stampede
- 2009: Albuquerque Thunderbirds
- 2009: New York Knicks
- 2009–2010: Toulon Basket
- 2010–2011: BCM Gravelines Dunkerque
- 2011–2013: Baloncesto Fuenlabrada
- 2013: Sharks Antibes
- 2015–2016: Austin Spurs

Career highlights
- LNB Pro A All-Star (2010); NBA D-League Co-Defensive Player of the Year (2008)
- Stats at NBA.com
- Stats at Basketball Reference

Mouhamed Saer Sene (born May 12, 1986) is a Senegalese former professional basketball player. He has a 7 ft 8½ in (2.35 m) wingspan.

== Early life and career ==
Born and raised in Thiès, Senegal, Sene originally went to a private school to become a mechanic, but his father pushed him toward basketball. In 2003, he joined the SEED Academy, a program designed to send Senegalese youths to the United States to play college basketball.

Between 2004 and 2005, Sene attended two Reebok Eurocamps in Treviso, Italy, participated in the Berlin Adidas Camp, played exhibition games against NCAA teams with the Interhoop African All-Stars touring team, and played in Belgium for the Spirou Basket junior squad.

== Professional career ==
=== Verviers-Pepinster (2005–2006) ===
Sene's first professional season came in 2005–06, when he joined VOO Wolves Verviers-Pepinster of the Belgian League. He appeared in 25 games for Verviers-Pepinster, averaging 4.0 points, 5.2 rebounds and 1.0 blocks in 12.3 minutes per game.

=== NBA (2006–2009) ===
==== 2006–07 season ====
On June 28, 2006, Sene was selected by the Seattle SuperSonics with the 10th overall pick in the 2006 NBA draft. He played sparingly for the SuperSonics over the first two months of the 2006–07 season, managing to appear in just 16 games by early January. On January 10, 2007, he was assigned to the Idaho Stampede of the NBA Development League, a stint which lasted until January 26. In his first game back for the SuperSonics on January 28, he scored a season-high 10 points in 12 minutes off the bench against the Los Angeles Clippers. He was later reassigned to Idaho on February 3 and spent the majority of the month of February in the D-League. He finished his rookie season playing in nine games over March and April, totalling 28 games for the SuperSonics in 2006–07.

==== 2007–08 season ====
Sene returned to the SuperSonics for the 2007–08 season but managed just 13 games for the entire season. He spent the majority of his time in the D-League playing for the Idaho Stampede, earning D-League Defensive Player of the Year honors alongside Stéphane Lasme at season's end. In 28 games for Idaho in 2007–08, Sene averaged 12.1 points, 8.9 rebounds and 1.7 blocks in 27.5 minutes per game.

==== 2008–09 season ====
With the SuperSonics' relocation to Oklahoma City in 2008, Sene continued on with the Oklahoma City Thunder in 2008–09. Due to off-season knee surgery, Sene missed the start of the regular season. He played in five games for the Thunder during November 2008, but following this, he did not play in another game for the team. On February 19, 2009, Sene was waived by the Thunder.

On March 11, 2009, Sene was acquired by the Albuquerque Thunderbirds of the NBA D-League. He played in 10 games for the Thunderbirds before being called up to the NBA by the New York Knicks, signing a rest-of-season contract with the team on April 9. He managed just one game for the Knicks over the final week of the regular season, and on July 31, he was waived by the team.

=== France (2009–2011) ===
On September 26, 2009, Sene signed with Hyères-Toulon Var Basket of the LNB Pro A. He appeared in 29 games for Hyères-Toulon in 2009–10, averaging 12.4 points, a league-best 11.4 rebounds and 2.4 blocks per game.

On June 12, 2010, Sene signed a two-year deal with Spirou Basket, the team he launched his career with in 2004. He later left the club before appearing in a game for them, and on November 21, 2010, he signed with French club BCM Gravelines Dunkerque for the rest of the season. In 25 league games for Gravelines in 2010–11, he averaged 10.4 points, 7.4 rebounds and 1.3 blocks per game.

=== Spain (2011–2013) ===
On August 16, 2011, Sene signed a two-year deal with Baloncesto Fuenlabrada of the Liga ACB. He sustained an injury in January 2012, which forced him to sit out the remainder of the season. He appeared in 15 league games for Fuenlabrada in 2011–12, averaging 6.3 points, 5.9 rebounds and 1.7 blocks per game.

Sene returned to Fuenlabrada in 2012–13, playing in 30 games and averaging 5.4 points, 5.4 rebounds and 1.1 blocks per game.

=== Second stint in France (2013) ===
On July 30, 2013, Sene signed a two-year deal with French club Sharks Antibes. A knee injury suffered in October forced Sene to miss the rest of the season. He appeared in just three games for Antibes, averaging 8.7 points, 5.7 rebounds and 1.0 steals per game.

=== Austin Spurs (2015–2016) ===
On March 18, 2015, Sene was acquired by the Austin Spurs of the NBA Development League. In 13 games (seven regular season, six playoff) for the Spurs in 2014–15, he averaged 20.3 points, 6.5 rebounds and 3.6 blocks per game.

On February 26, 2016, Sene was reacquired by Austin. On March 22, he was waived by the Spurs. He made just one appearance for the team, recording two points and three rebounds in 16 minutes on March 6 against the Idaho Stampede.

== NBA career statistics ==
Legend
GP	Games played	GS	Games started	MPG	Minutes per game
FG%	Field goal percentage	3P%	3-point field goal percentage	FT%	Free throw percentage
RPG	Rebounds per game	APG	Assists per game	SPG	Steals per game
BPG	Blocks per game	PPG	Points per game	**Bold**	Career high

=== Regular season ===
Year	Team	GP	GS	MPG	FG%	3P%	FT%	RPG	APG	SPG	BPG	PPG
2006–07	Seattle	**28**	**3**	**6.0**	.367	.000	.586	1.6	.0	.1	.4	1.9
2007–08	Seattle	13	0	4.8	.458	.000	.471	1.2	**.1**	.0	.5	2.3
2008–09	Oklahoma City	5	0	4.6	**.714**	.000	.778	1.8	.0	**.2**	.4	**3.4**
2008–09	New York	1	0	**6.0**	.500	.000	**1.000**	**5.0**	.0	.0	**1.0**	3.0
Career		47	3	5.5	.427	.000	.589	1.6	.0	.1	.5	2.2

== National team career ==
Sene first played for the Senegal national basketball team during the 2013 AfroBasket. The following year, he missed out on the 2014 FIBA Basketball World Cup due to the knee injury sustained while playing for Sharks Antibes. He returned to the national team for the 2015 AfroBasket.
