= Ray Allen =

American basketball player (born 1975)

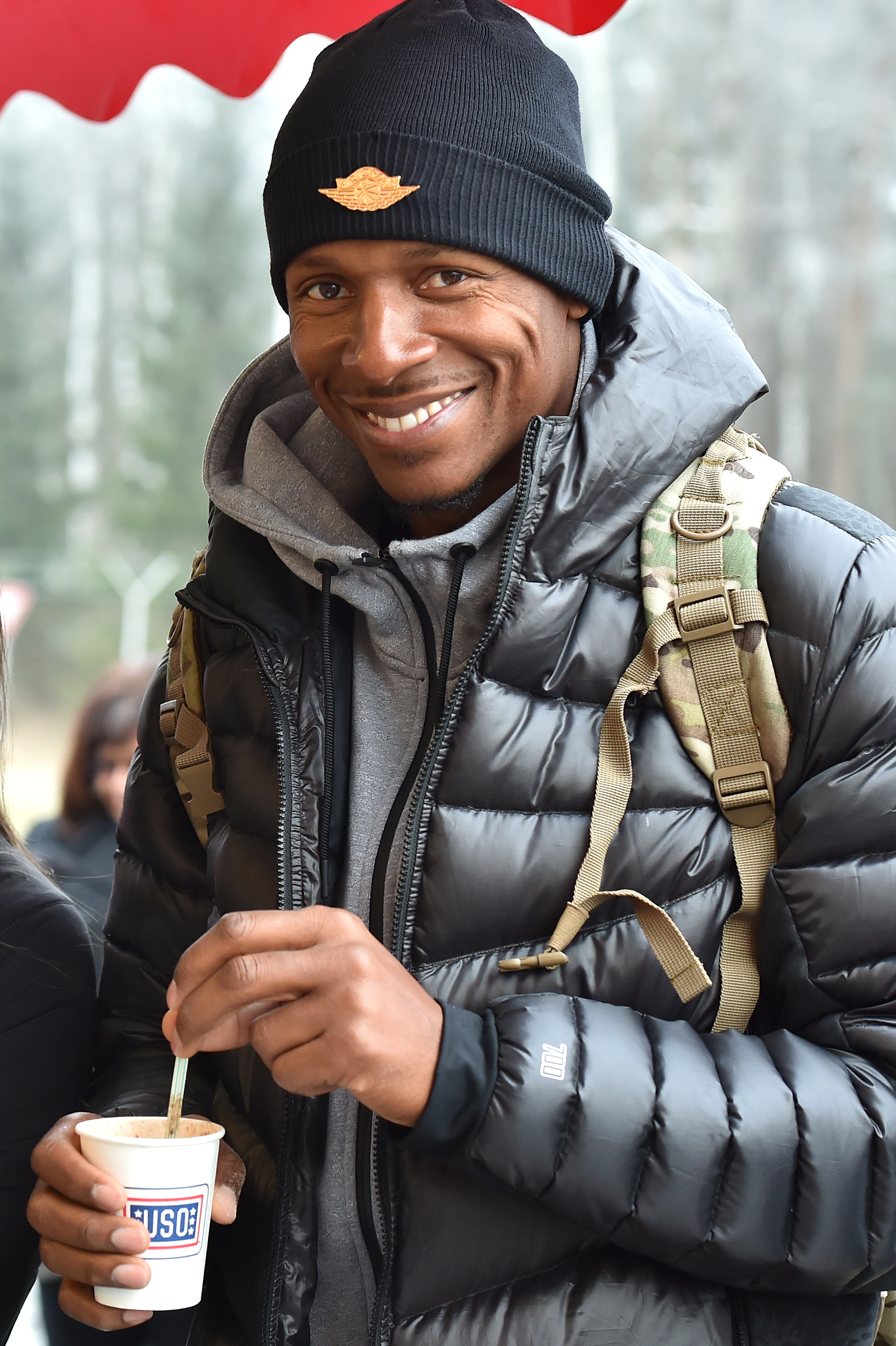
- Allen in 2016

Personal information
- Born: July 20, 1975 (age 51) Merced, California, U.S.
- Listed height: 6 ft 5 in (1.96 m)
- Listed weight: 205 lb (93 kg)

Career information
- High school: Hillcrest (Dalzell, South Carolina)
- College: UConn (1993–1996)
- NBA draft: 1996: 1st round, 5th overall pick
- Drafted by: Minnesota Timberwolves
- Playing career: 1996–2014
- Position: Shooting guard
- Number: 34, 20

Career history
- 1996–2003: Milwaukee Bucks
- 2003–2007: Seattle SuperSonics
- 2007–2012: Boston Celtics
- 2012–2014: Miami Heat

Career highlights
- 2× NBA champion (2008, 2013); 10× NBA All-Star (2000–2002, 2004–2009, 2011); All-NBA Second Team (2005); All-NBA Third Team (2001); NBA Three-Point Contest champion (2001); NBA All-Rookie Second Team (1997); NBA 75th Anniversary Team; UPI Player of the Year (1996); Consensus first-team All-American (1996); Big East Player of the Year (1996); 2× First-team All-Big East (1995, 1996); USA Basketball Male Athlete of the Year (1995); No. 34 retired by UConn Huskies; South Carolina Mr. Basketball (1993)

Career NBA statistics
- Points: 24,505 (18.9 ppg)
- Rebounds: 5,272 (4.1 rpg)
- Assists: 4,361 (3.4 apg)
- Stats at NBA.com
- Stats at Basketball Reference
- Basketball Hall of Fame
Medals
Men's basketball
Representing United States
Olympic Games
Gold medal – first place	2000 Sydney	Team
FIBA Americas Championship
Gold medal – first place	2003 San Juan	Team
Summer Universiade
Gold medal – first place	1995 Fukuoka	Team

Walter Ray Allen Jr. (born July 20, 1975) is an American former professional basketball player. Allen played 18 seasons in the National Basketball Association (NBA) and was inducted into the Naismith Memorial Basketball Hall of Fame as a player in 2018. He is widely considered one of the greatest three-point shooters of all time. Allen was a ten-time NBA All-Star, and won an Olympic gold medal as a member of the 2000 United States men's basketball team. At the time of his retirement, he was the leading three-point scorer in NBA history until he was surpassed by Stephen Curry in 2021. As of 2025, he ranks third on the NBA's all-time three-pointers list. In 2021, he was selected to the NBA 75th Anniversary Team.

Allen played college basketball for the Connecticut Huskies for three seasons, before he was selected with the fifth overall pick in the 1996 NBA draft, and developed into a prolific scorer for the Milwaukee Bucks, featuring alongside Glenn Robinson and Sam Cassell as the team achieved playoff success. In 2003, he was traded to the Seattle SuperSonics, where he solidified his reputation as a scorer, breaking several league records for three-point and free throw shooting. Allen was later traded to the Boston Celtics, where he formed a "Big Three" with Kevin Garnett and Paul Pierce; the team won an NBA championship in 2008. After five seasons with the Celtics, he played with the Miami Heat for two seasons, reaching the NBA Finals both times and winning the title in 2013; his clutch three-pointer to force overtime in Game 6 of the 2013 Finals is regarded as one of the most iconic and memorable plays in NBA history. Allen retired on November 1, 2016, after playing for four different teams.

During his NBA career, Allen acted in some films, such as his role as basketball prodigy Jesus Shuttlesworth in Spike Lee's basketball drama He Got Game (1998). Allen's performance as Shuttlesworth was praised by critics, and the name was borrowed as Allen's basketball nickname.

== Early life ==
The third of five children, Allen was born at Castle Air Force Base near Merced, California, the son of Walter Sr. and Flora Allen. A military child, he spent time growing up in Saxmundham, Suffolk, England, in Altus, Oklahoma, at Edwards Air Force Base in California, and in Germany. After years of traveling and frequent moves, his family settled in Dalzell, South Carolina, for four years, where he would attend high school. When he first arrived, the young Allen was often the odd-man-out, picked on by other kids for the accent acquired during his formative years in Britain. Allen's athletic gifts and work ethic allowed him to excel in sports. When a growth spurt left him with a natural advantage in basketball, he decided to dedicate his free time to becoming the best basketball player he possibly could.

Fueled by his desire to become the top player on his military base, Allen practiced at length daily, so long as it did not interfere with his studies. By the age of fifteen, he was playing for Hillcrest High School's varsity team, and would eventually lead them to their first state championship. Allen scored 25 points and notched 12 rebounds in a blowout victory for Hillcrest Wildcats. At Hillcrest, he was teammates with future Major League Baseball player Terrell Wade. He drew much attention from college recruiters, especially from the University of Kentucky, but ultimately accepted an offer from the University of Connecticut.

== College career ==
Allen attended the University of Connecticut from 1993 to 1996.

As a freshman with the Huskies in 1993–94, Allen came off the bench in 34 games he played, averaging 12.6 points, 4.6 rebounds, 1.4 assists and 1.1 steals in 21.6 minutes per game. He was subsequently named to the Big East All-Freshman Team.

As a sophomore in 1994–95, Allen played 32 games with 31 starts, averaging 21.1 points, 6.8 rebounds, 2.3 assists and 1.9 steals in 32.8 minutes per game. He was named first-team All-Big East.

As a junior in 1995–96, Allen started all 35 games and averaged 23.4 points, 6.5 rebounds, 3.3 assists and 1.7 steals in 34.7 minutes per game. He was named the Big East Player of the Year and earned first-team All-Big East. The Huskies won their third consecutive Big East Conference regular season title and played in their third consecutive NCAA Tournament.

Allen declared for the 1996 NBA draft. As of 2018, his 1,922 point total ranked fifth all-time, his 19.0 career average was fourth, his 44.8 three-point field goal percentage was first, and the 818 points he scored as a junior was the third-highest season total in UConn history.

In January 2001, Allen was named honorary captain of the 25-member UConn All-Century Basketball Team. In February 2007, he was an inaugural inductee in the UConn men's basketball "Huskies of Honor" recognition program. In March 2019, his number 34 jersey was retired by UConn.

In May 2023, Allen graduated from UConn with a Bachelor's Degree in General Studies.

== NBA career ==
=== Milwaukee Bucks (1996–2003) ===
==== 1996–1999: early years in Milwaukee ====
Allen was drafted by the Minnesota Timberwolves with the fifth pick of the 1996 NBA draft. Immediately after his selection, Allen and Andrew Lang were traded to the Milwaukee Bucks for the rights to fourth pick Stephon Marbury. On July 24, 1996, Allen signed a 3-year, $6.2 million contract with the Bucks. Allen made his NBA debut on November 1, 1996, where he started and played 28 minutes and scored 13 points in a win against fellow rookie Allen Iverson and the Philadelphia 76ers. On January 12, 1997, Allen put in one of his strongest efforts of the season in a win against the Golden State Warriors, contributing 22 points, 6 assists, 3 steals and a new career high of 9 rebounds. In February 1997, Allen competed in the Slam Dunk Contest during All-Star Weekend, where he finished fourth. Continuing his strong rookie season, on March 25, 1997, Allen scored a new career high of 32 points in a loss to the Phoenix Suns. Allen was named to the NBA All-Rookie Second Team.

In the 1997–98 season, Allen played and started all 82 games for the Bucks. In the season opener, he put up 29 points, including 6 three-pointers in a win against the 76ers. On December 20, 1997, Allen set a new career high of 35 points against the New York Knicks. On the brink of missing the playoffs for the second straight year, on April 18, 1998, the last game of the regular season, Allen tallied a 40-point double-double with 10 rebounds.

==== 1999–2003: building his legacy ====
On February 10, 1999, following the 1998–99 NBA lockout, Allen signed a six-year, $70.9 million extension with the Bucks, making him the highest paid player in franchise history at that point. The 1998–99 season saw Allen make his first playoff appearance, with the Bucks earning the seventh seed. There they were swept by the Indiana Pacers in the first round despite Allen averaging 22.3 points per game. The following season, on January 20, 2000, Allen recorded a career-high 13 assists in a loss to the Seattle SuperSonics. On February 3, 2000, Allen scored 36 points and grabbed 8 rebounds in a 102–99 win against the Utah Jazz. A month later, Allen played in his first All-Star Game, where he had 14 points in 17 minutes. During the 1999–2000 season, Allen led the Bucks in scoring during the regular and post-season.

On February 7, 2001, Allen recorded his first career triple-double with 20 points, 10 rebounds and 11 assists against the Boston Celtics. A few days later, he participated and won his first 3-point shootout during All-Star Weekend. Allen, alongside Sam Cassell and Glenn Robinson, helped lead the Bucks to the Eastern Conference finals. Allen recorded a new playoff career high with 41 points in a Game 6 victory over the 76ers, but the Bucks ultimately lost in seven games. Allen earned All-NBA Third Team honors in 2001.

=== Seattle SuperSonics (2003–2007) ===
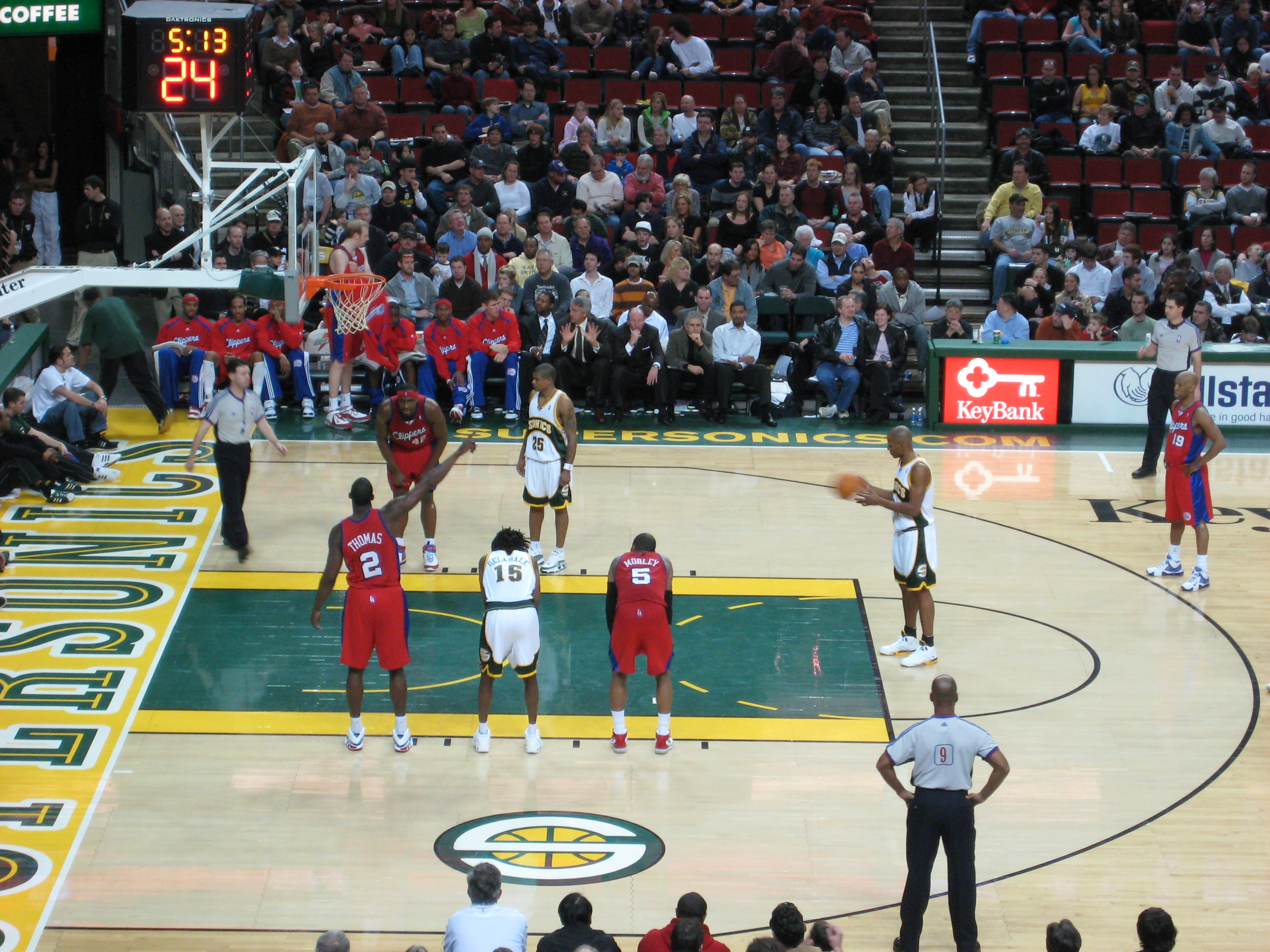
Allen prepares to shoot a free throw in 2007

Allen remained with the Bucks midway through the 2002–03 season, when he was dealt to the Seattle SuperSonics, along with Ronald Murray, former UConn teammate Kevin Ollie, and a conditional first round draft pick, in exchange for Gary Payton and Desmond Mason. It was speculated that Allen's contentious relationship with coach George Karl played a role in the Bucks' willingness to part with Allen.

After an injury-riddled 2003–04 season, Allen was named to the All-NBA Second Team in the 2004–05 season and, alongside teammate Rashard Lewis, led the Sonics to the 2005 Conference semifinals.

In July 2005, Allen signed a five-year, $85 million contract with the SuperSonics.

On March 12, 2006, Allen became the 97th player in NBA history to score 15,000 points. On April 7, 2006, Allen moved into second place on the NBA's list of all-time 3-point field goals made, trailing only Reggie Miller. On April 19, 2006, Allen broke Dennis Scott's ten-year-old NBA record for 3-point field goals made in a season in a game against the Denver Nuggets. The record was broken by Stephen Curry.

In the 2006–07 regular season, Allen averaged a career-high 26.4 points per game while adding 4.5 rebounds and 4.1 assists per game. On January 12, 2007, he scored a career-high 54 points against the Utah Jazz in a 122–114 overtime win, the second most in Sonics history. Shortly after, he had ankle surgery on both ankles and missed the remainder of the 2006–07 season.

=== Boston Celtics (2007–2012) ===
==== 2007–2008: first championship ====
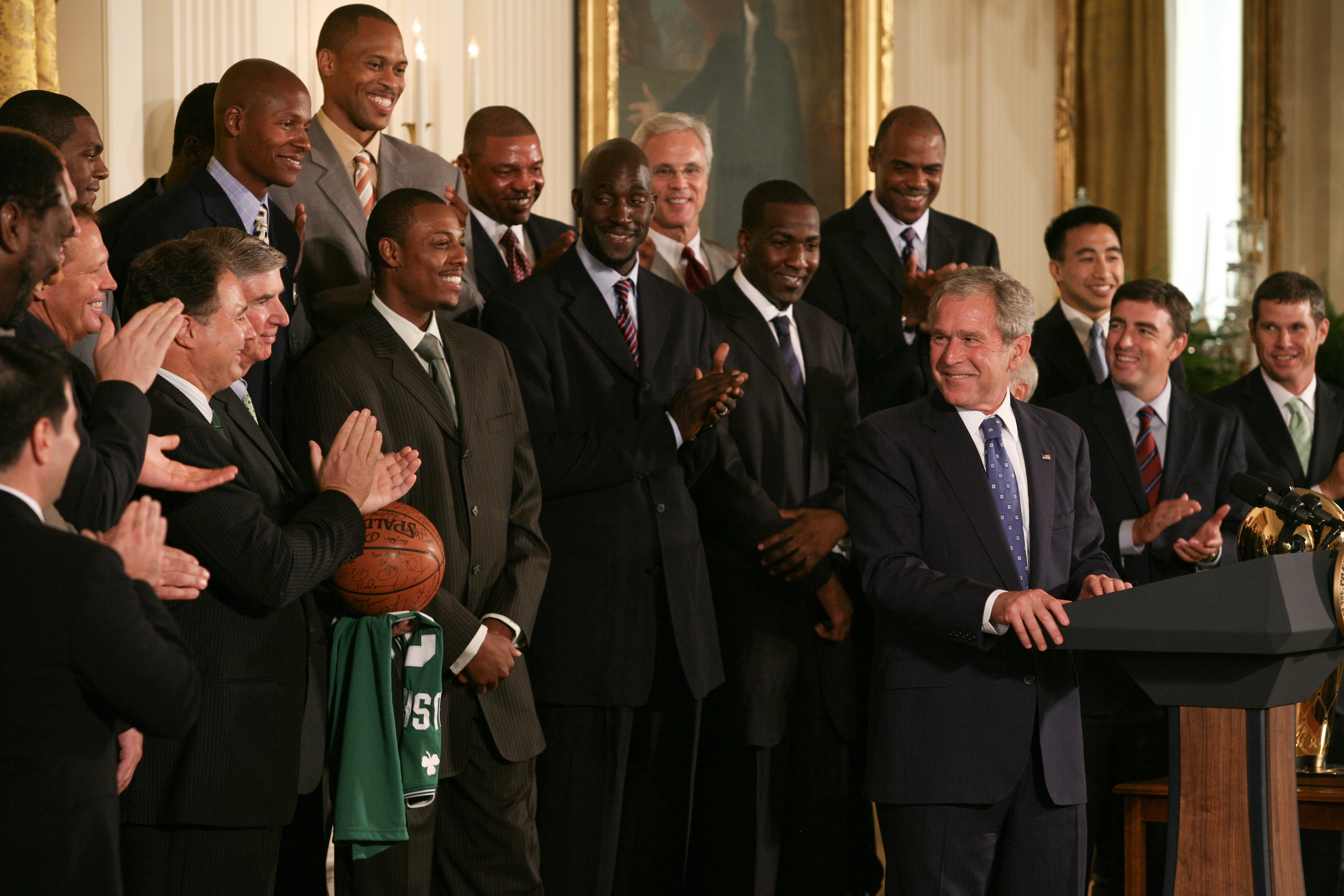
Allen and the 2008 NBA champion Boston Celtics with President George W. Bush at the White House

On June 28, 2007, the Sonics traded Allen and Glen Davis, the 35th overall pick in the 2007 NBA draft, to the Celtics in exchange for Delonte West, Wally Szczerbiak, and the fifth overall pick, Jeff Green. Shortly after acquiring Allen, the Celtics acquired Minnesota Timberwolves forward Kevin Garnett to play alongside Allen and Paul Pierce. Upon joining the Celtics, Allen changed his jersey to number 20 because Paul Pierce already had number 34 in Boston.

On November 4, 2007, Allen passed 17,000 points for his career with his first of two 3-pointers in overtime in a 98–95 victory against the Toronto Raptors, in which he sank the game winning 3-pointer with three seconds remaining in overtime.

On February 13, 2008, Allen was named as an All-Star replacement for the injured Caron Butler in the 2008 NBA All-Star Game. Allen scored 14 points in a stretch of 2 minutes and 30 seconds in the fourth quarter to seal the win for the East team. On March 28, 2008, Allen was honored as the 3rd best of the 20 greatest players in franchise history during Milwaukee's 40th Anniversary Team Celebration, but could not attend the festivities because of the Celtics' game against the New Orleans Hornets.

The Celtics finished 66–16, and were the #1 seed in the 2008 NBA Playoffs. The Celtics struggled in the first two rounds of the playoffs, losing every single away game, but maintaining an undefeated playoff record at home. The Celtics had defeated the #8 seeded Atlanta Hawks 4–3 and then defeated the #4 seeded Cleveland Cavaliers 4–3 as well. They advanced to the 2008 NBA Finals after a 4–2 Conference finals series win over the Detroit Pistons.

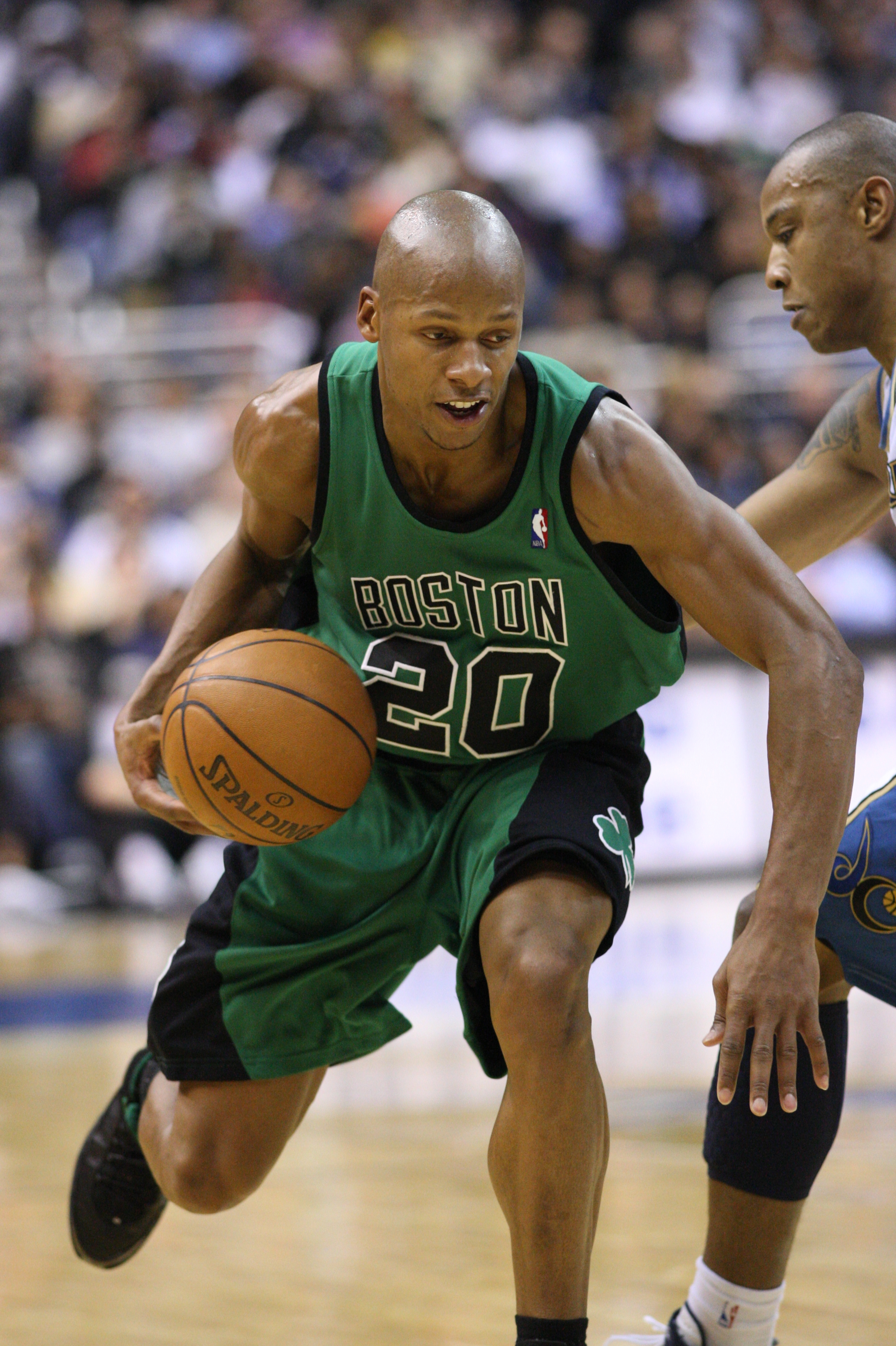
Allen in 2008

In Game 4 of the NBA Finals, Allen would play all 48 minutes and contribute greatly with 19 points and 9 rebounds in what would become the largest comeback in NBA Finals history, with the Celtics coming back from a 24-point deficit at one point in the second quarter and a deficit as large as 20 in the third. In that game, Allen would make the game clinching layup with 16.4 seconds remaining to give the Celtics a 5-point lead and put the game away. In Game 6, Allen tied an NBA Finals record with seven three-pointers in the Celtics' 131–92 victory over the Los Angeles Lakers. With the victory, Allen secured his first NBA championship.

==== 2008–2012: Another Finals appearance and 3-point record ====
On February 5, 2009, Allen was named as the All-Star replacement for Orlando Magic point guard Jameer Nelson. This marked Allen's ninth time on the All-Star team and the second straight year he had made it alongside teammates Kevin Garnett and Paul Pierce. On February 22, 2009, with his streak ending at 72, Allen broke the Celtics franchise record in consecutive free throws made previously set by Larry Bird (71).

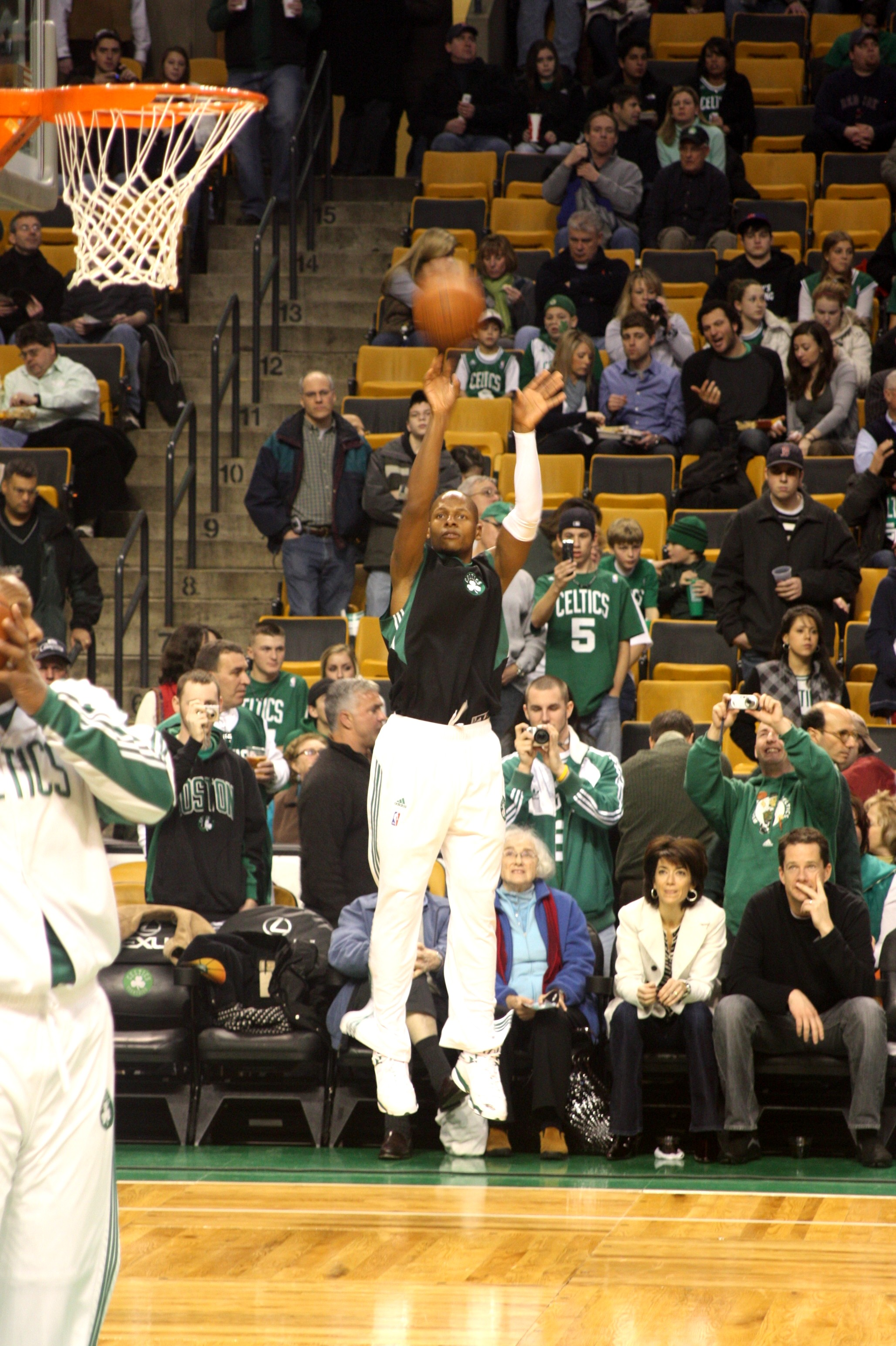
Allen in 2009

In the first round of the 2009 playoffs against the Chicago Bulls, game one proved to be tough for Allen. He ended up shooting 1–11 from the field, and the Celtics lost by two. In game 2 however, Allen nailed the game winning three-pointer at the end of regulation with two seconds left to cap off an impressive 30 point night. In a Game 6 loss, Allen scored 51 points. Boston ended up winning the series in seven games. In the conference semifinals, he had a 22-point performance in a Game 2 victory. The Celtics went on to lose in seven games as they failed to defend their title.

On December 10, 2009, Allen scored 18 points to reach the 20,000 point total for his career.

On June 6, 2010, in Game 2 of the 2010 NBA Finals in a 103–94 victory against the Los Angeles Lakers, Allen set a then record for most three-pointers made in an NBA Finals game on 8–11 shooting to tie the series 1–1. He broke Michael Jordan's record of six three-pointers in one half by hitting seven in the first half and had tied Scottie Pippen and Kenny Smith's record for most three-pointers in one game in the NBA Finals by half time. Allen also became the first player in NBA history to have two separate games of scoring at least seven three-pointers in the NBA Finals. The Celtics would win two of three games in Boston, before losing the last two games and the series in Los Angeles.

After becoming a free agent on July 1, 2010, Allen re-signed a two-year deal with the Boston Celtics on July 7 worth $20 million.

During a game against the Los Angeles Lakers on February 10, 2011, Allen became the all-time NBA leader in total three-pointers made (2,562), surpassing Reggie Miller's record of 2,560. The 35-year-old shooting guard finished the game with 20 points but the Celtics eventually lost 92–86. In the 2010–11 NBA season Allen was named to his tenth All-Star game alongside teammates Rajon Rondo, Paul Pierce and Kevin Garnett. Also during All-Star Weekend, Allen competed in the Three-Point Shootout, but lost to James Jones of the Miami Heat.

During the 2011–12 NBA season, Allen was privately frustrated with trade rumors in February, issues with teammate Rajon Rondo, and an ankle injury that ultimately required surgery in June 2012 to remove bone spurs. The Celtics lost in seven games to the Miami Heat in the 2012 Eastern Conference finals.

=== Miami Heat (2012–2014) ===
==== 2012–2013: second championship ====
"There's no target, I don’t aim. If I'm aiming, that’s when I'm missing. The way I look at it is, just get the ball in the air. You do it over and over again, you should never have a target."

— Ray Allen on his process of three-point shooting, 2013

Allen's initial plan in the summer of 2012 was to stay with the Boston Celtics. He was reportedly seeking a three-year, $24 million contract whereas the Celtics were offering a two-year, $12 million deal. Further internal discord with a bench role and a Rondo-focused approach led to Allen rejecting the Celtics and instead choosing to sign a two-year, $6 million deal with the Miami Heat. The Heat were limited to their mid-level exception amount of slightly more than $3 million per season.

During Allen's first season with the Miami Heat, he averaged 10.9 points per game and made 88.6% of his free throws while playing an average of 25.8 minutes per game. On April 25, 2013, while playing Milwaukee in Game 3 of the first round of the playoffs, Allen made his 322nd career three-pointer in the playoffs, which broke Reggie Miller's record for most three-pointers made in NBA playoff history. Allen returned to his favorite #34 jersey upon joining the Heat.

In Game 6 of the NBA Finals against the San Antonio Spurs, Allen played 41 minutes in Game 6 off the bench and scored 9 points on 3-for-8 field goal shooting; his game-tying three-pointer was the only three-pointer he made in three attempts. Allen also had one defensive rebound and two assists. As the Heat trailed by three points, Allen made a game-tying 3-pointer with 5.2 seconds left in the fourth quarter to force overtime. With the Heat leading 101–100, Allen stole the ball from Manu Ginóbili under the Spurs' basket and drew a foul with 1.9 seconds remaining in the overtime period. Allen made both ensuing free throws to put Miami up 103–100.

Having rallied from a 10-point deficit at the end of the third quarter, the Heat won in overtime 103–100 over the San Antonio Spurs and forced a seventh game in the series. In Game 7, which the Heat won 95–88 to win its second consecutive championship, Allen played 20 minutes off the bench. Although he made none of 4 field goal attempts and had 3 turnovers, Allen recorded 4 defensive rebounds and 4 assists. For their eventual victory, Allen's three-pointer in Game 6 has been cited as one of the single most significant shots in NBA history.

==== 2013–2014: final playing year ====
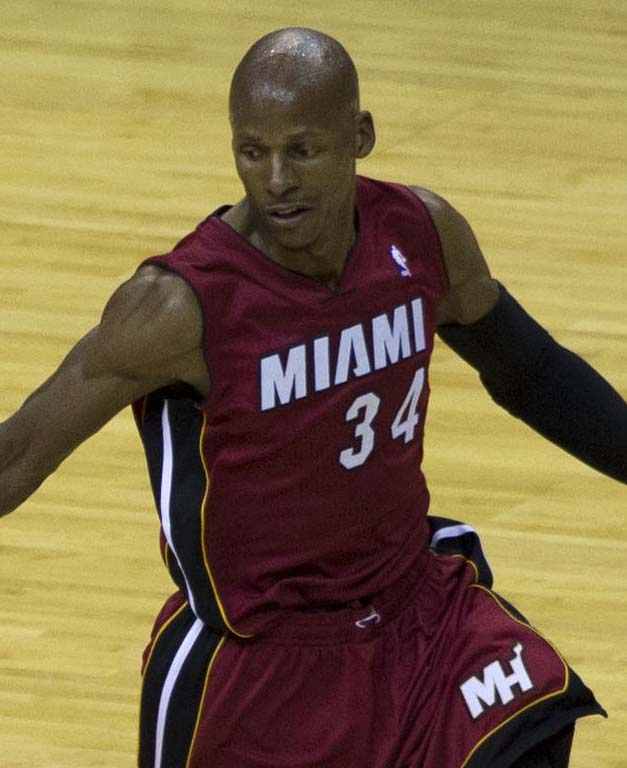
Allen in 2014

On June 29, 2013, Allen picked up his $3.23 million player option to stay with the Heat through the 2013–14 NBA season. During the regular season, Allen played in 73 games, starting 9 of them, averaging 9.6 points and shooting 37 percent from three-point range. In the playoffs, Allen scored 19 points on 4–7 three-point shooting in game 4 of the conference semifinals against the Brooklyn Nets. Then in Game 3 against the Indiana Pacers in an Eastern Conference finals rematch, Allen hit four 3-point shots in the fourth quarter and put them up 2–1 in the series. The Heat won the series in six games to advance to the NBA Finals for the fourth straight year and Allen's second. The Heat faced the Spurs again in the 2014 NBA Finals, but they lost the series in five games.

=== Retirement ===
Allen became a free agent in the 2014 off-season, and was reportedly considering joining the Cleveland Cavaliers to reunite with former Miami Heat teammate LeBron James. After much anticipation of a return at some point during the 2014–15 season, he announced his decision to sit out the season and focus on 2015–16. However, he did not end up joining a team. In July 2016, Allen began mulling a comeback, and admitted he was "intrigued" by the possibility of competing for another championship. The following month, Allen had talks with the Boston Celtics and the Milwaukee Bucks regarding a possible return, but ultimately decided to officially retire on November 1, 2016. In September 2018, Allen was inducted into the Naismith Memorial Basketball Hall of Fame. In February 2019, Allen played in the NBA All-Star Celebrity Game. In October 2021, Allen was honored as one of the league's greatest players of all time by being named to the NBA's 75th Anniversary Team. He was also named in the top 75 players by The Athletic.

== Acting career ==
In 1998, Allen co-starred alongside Denzel Washington in the Spike Lee film He Got Game as high school basketball phenomenon Jesus Shuttlesworth. Roger Ebert praised his performance and said Allen "is that rarity: an athlete who can act," while New York magazine described him as "graceful and fast in the basketball scenes" while giving "a somberly effective minimalist performance." His role as Jesus Shuttlesworth earned him that name as a nickname from teammates and fans. Allen also appeared as Marcus Blake in the 2001 film Harvard Man. In 2015, Allen co-starred alongside Kyrie Irving, Baron Davis and J. B. Smoove as Walt in the fourth episode of "Uncle Drew", a series of Pepsi Max advertisements written and directed by Irving.

== Personal life ==
Allen married singer/actress Shannon Walker Williams on August 16, 2008, after having dated since 2004. They have four children together.

Allen says that he has a borderline case of obsessive–compulsive disorder, to which he attributes his consummate shooting style.

Allen served as NBA Spokesperson for the Jr. NBA / Jr. WNBA program and was selected as NBA Spokesman for the Thurgood Marshall College Fund. He also started the "Ray of Hope" Foundation to assist charities in several communities.

Former President Obama appointed Allen to the United States Holocaust Memorial Council. Allen is a longtime supporter of the Holocaust Memorial Museum and has brought teammates and friends to the museum on frequent visits. In August 2017, he penned a first-person article for "The Players' Tribune", entitled Why I Went to Auschwitz.

On November 21, 2017, Allen said in a court filing that he was the victim of "catfishing" by a man who posed online as several different women. In an emergency motion, Allen was responding to a claim made by the man, Bryant Coleman, that he was being stalked by Allen.

Allen's autobiography, From the Outside, was released on March 27, 2018.

On July 18, 2021, Allen suffered injuries in a serious bicycle crash, and he credited his bicycle helmet with effectively saving his life.

On August 20, 2021, Allen accepted a position as director of boys' and girls' basketball and boys' varsity basketball head coach at Gulliver Preparatory School.

In the spring of 2023, Allen received a bachelor's degree in General Studies from the University of Connecticut.

== Career statistics ==
Legend
GP	Games played	GS	Games started	MPG	Minutes per game
FG%	Field goal percentage	3P%	3-point field goal percentage	FT%	Free throw percentage
RPG	Rebounds per game	APG	Assists per game	SPG	Steals per game
BPG	Blocks per game	PPG	Points per game	**Bold**	Career high
†	Won an NBA championship	*	Led the league	‡	NBA record

=== College ===
Year	Team	GP	GS	MPG	FG%	3P%	FT%	RPG	APG	SPG	BPG	PPG
1993–94	Connecticut	34	0	21.6	**.510**	.402	.792	4.6	1.4	1.1	.2	12.6
1994–95	Connecticut	32	31	32.8	.489	.445	.727	**6.8**	2.3	**1.9**	**.5**	21.1
1995–96	Connecticut	**35**	**35**	**34.7**	.472	**.466**	**.810**	6.5	**3.3**	1.7	**.5**	**23.4**
Career		101	66	29.7	.487	.448	.779	6.0	2.4	1.6	.4	19.0

=== NBA ===
==== Regular season ====
Year	Team	GP	GS	MPG	FG%	3P%	FT%	RPG	APG	SPG	BPG	PPG
1996–97	Milwaukee	**82**	81	30.9	.430	.393	.823	4.0	2.6	.9	.1	13.4
1997–98	Milwaukee	**82***	**82***	40.1	.428	.364	.875	4.9	4.3	1.4	.1	19.5
1998–99	Milwaukee	50*	50*	34.4	.450	.356	.903	4.2	3.6	1.1	.1	17.1
1999–00	Milwaukee	**82**	**82***	37.4	.455	.423	.887	4.4	3.8	1.3	.2	22.1
2000–01	Milwaukee	**82**	**82***	38.2	.480	.433	.888	5.2	4.6	1.5	.2	22.0
2001–02	Milwaukee	69	67	36.6	.462	.434	.873	4.5	3.9	1.3	**.3**	21.8
2002–03	Milwaukee	47	46	35.8	.437	.395	.913	4.6	3.5	1.2	.2	21.3
2002–03	Seattle	29	29	**41.3**	.441	.351	.920	**5.6**	**5.9**	**1.6**	.1	24.5
2003–04	Seattle	56	56	38.4	.440	.392	.904	5.1	4.8	1.3	.2	23.0
2004–05	Seattle	78	78	39.3	.428	.376	.883	4.4	3.7	1.1	.1	23.9
2005–06	Seattle	78	78	38.7	.454	.412	.903	4.3	3.7	1.3	.2	25.1
2006–07	Seattle	55	55	40.3	.438	.372	.903	4.5	4.1	1.5	.2	**26.4**
2007–08†	Boston	73	73	35.9	.445	.398	.907	3.7	3.1	.9	.2	17.4
2008–09	Boston	79	79	36.4	.480	.409	**.952**	3.5	2.8	.9	.2	18.2
2009–10	Boston	80	80	35.2	.477	.363	.913	3.2	2.6	.8	**.3**	16.3
2010–11	Boston	80	80	36.1	**.491**	.444	.881	3.4	2.7	1.0	.2	16.5
2011–12	Boston	46	42	34.0	.458	**.453**	.915	3.1	2.4	1.1	.2	14.2
2012–13†	Miami	79	0	25.8	.449	.419	.886	2.7	1.7	.8	.2	10.9
2013–14	Miami	73	9	26.5	.442	.375	.905	2.8	2.0	.7	.1	9.6
Career		1,300	1,149	35.6	.452	.400	.894	4.1	3.4	1.1	.2	18.9
All-Star		10	0	20.1	.423	.310	.765	2.6	2.2	1.1	.2	14.5

==== Playoffs ====
Year	Team	GP	GS	MPG	FG%	3P%	FT%	RPG	APG	SPG	BPG	PPG
1999	Milwaukee	3	3	40.0	**.532**	.474	.615	**7.3**	4.3	1.0	.3	22.3
2000	Milwaukee	5	5	37.2	.444	.385	.909	6.6	2.6	**1.6**	.0	22.0
2001	Milwaukee	18	18	**42.7**	.477	.479	.919	4.1	**6.0**	1.3	**.6**	25.1
2005	Seattle	11	11	39.6	.474	.378	.889	4.3	3.9	1.3	.4	**26.5**
2008†	Boston	**26**‡	**26**‡	38.0	.428	.396	.913	3.8	2.7	.9	.3	15.6
2009	Boston	14	14	40.4	.403	.350	.948	3.9	2.6	1.1	.4	18.3
2010	Boston	24	24	38.5	.431	.386	.863	3.3	2.6	.9	.1	16.1
2011	Boston	9	9	40.1	.523	**.571**	**.960**	3.8	2.4	1.2	.1	18.9
2012	Boston	18	10	34.2	.395	.304	.711	4.1	1.0	.9	.1	10.7
2013†	Miami	23	0	24.9	.430	.406	.870	2.8	1.3	.5	.1	10.2
2014	Miami	20	1	26.4	.413	.388	.919	3.4	1.6	.7	.2	9.3
Career		171	121	35.5	.443	.401	.883	3.8	2.6	1.0	.2	16.1

== Awards and Honors ==
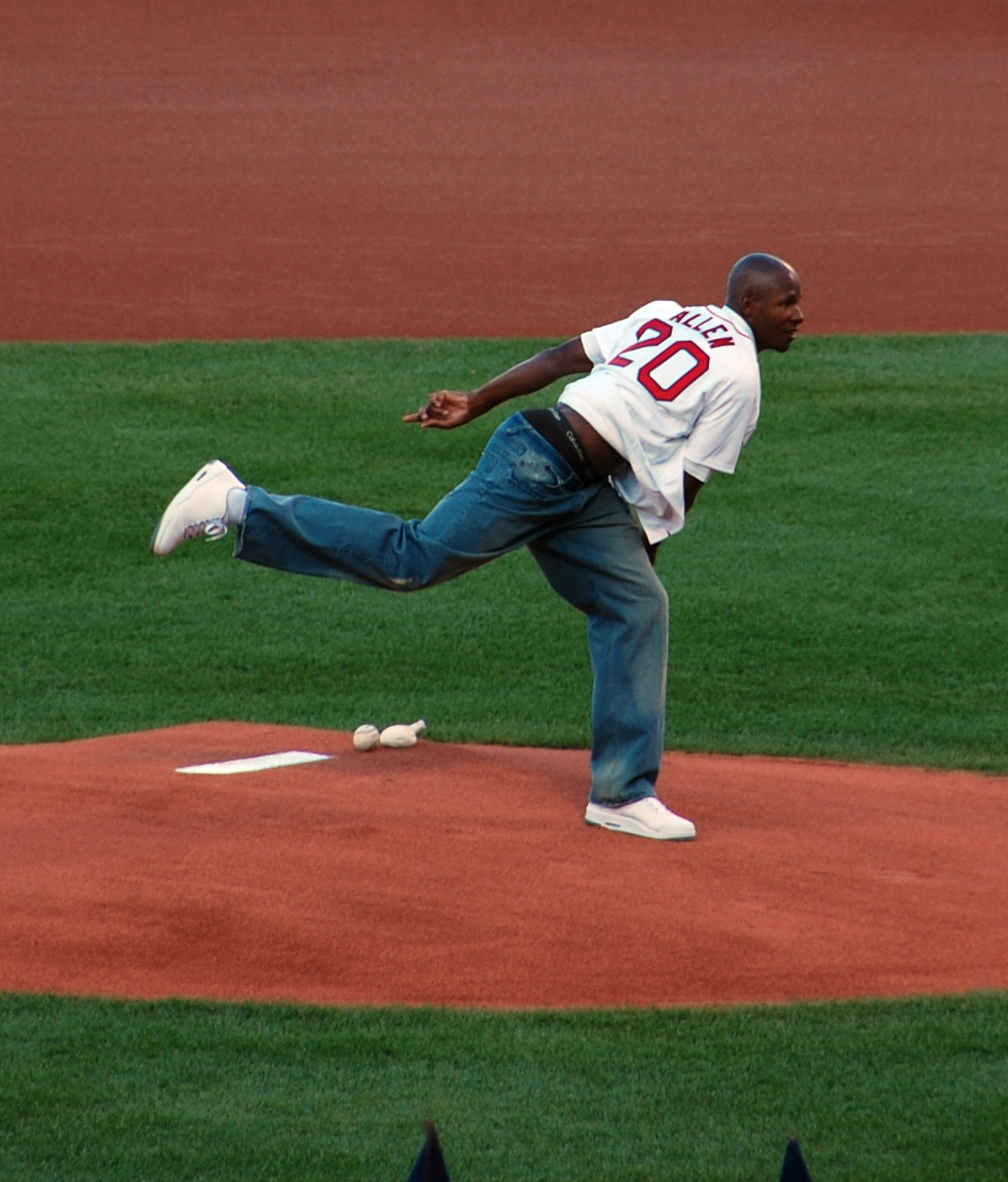
On July 2, 2007, shortly after being traded to the Celtics, Allen threw out the ceremonial first pitch for a Boston Red Sox game at Fenway Park.

NBA

- 2× NBA champion: 2008, 2013
- 10× NBA All-Star: 2000–2002, 2004–2009, 2011
- 2x All-NBA Team selections:
  - All-NBA Second Team: 2005
  - All-NBA Third Team: 2001
- NBA All-Rookie Second Team: 1997
- 3× NBA three-point scoring leader: 2002, 2003, 2006
- NBA Joe Dumars NBA Sportsmanship Award: 2003
- NBA Three-Point Contest champion: 2001
- Magic Johnson Award: 2001

USA Basketball

- Olympics gold medalist: 2000
- FIBA Americas Championship gold medalist: 2003
- Summer Universiade gold medalist: 1995
- USA Basketball Male Athlete of the Year: 1995

Other

- The Sporting News "Good Guy": 2000, 2001, 2005

== Records ==
=== NBA regular season ===
- 3-point field goal attempts, career: 7,429

=== NBA playoffs ===
- 3-point field goals attempted, game: 18, Boston Celtics at Chicago Bulls, April 30, 2009 (3 OT)
  - Tied with Stephen Curry (April 23, 2015), Damian Lillard (May 9, 2016), Klay Thompson (May 28, 2016), and Russell Westbrook (April 25, 2017)

=== NBA finals ===
- 3-point field goals made, half: 7, first half, Boston Celtics at Los Angeles Lakers, June 6, 2010
- 3-point field goals made, quarter: 5, second quarter, Boston Celtics at Los Angeles Lakers, June 6, 2010
  - Tied with Stephen Curry (June 3, 2018)

=== Milwaukee Bucks franchise records ===
- Consecutive games played: 400, from 11/1/96 to 12/20/01
- 3-point field goals made, career: 1,051
- 3-point field goals made, season: 229 (2001–02)
- 3-point field goals made, game: 10, vs. Charlotte Hornets, April 14, 2002
- 3-point field goals made, half: 8, second half, vs. Charlotte Hornets, April 14, 2002
  - Tied with Tim Thomas (second half, at Portland Trail Blazers, January 5, 2001) and Michael Redd (second half, vs. Houston Rockets, February 20, 2002)
- 3-point field goal attempts, season: 528 (2001–02)
- 3-point field goal attempts, game: 17, at Cleveland Cavaliers, December 9, 2002 (2 OT)
- 3-point field goal attempts, game (regulation): 14, four times (tied with Michael Redd)
  - 14, vs. Utah Jazz, April 12, 2001
  - 14, vs. New York Knicks, December 4, 2001
  - 14, vs. Charlotte Hornets, February 18, 2002
  - 14, vs. Charlotte Hornets, April 14, 2002

=== Seattle SuperSonics franchise records ===
- 3-point field goals made, season: 269 (2005–06)
- 3-point field goal attempts, season: 653 (2005–06)

=== Boston Celtics franchise records ===
- Highest free throw percentage, season: .952 (237/249) (2008–09)
- Consecutive free throws made: 72, from December 25, 2008, to February 23, 2009
- Highest 3-point field goal percentage, 2011–12 season: .453 (106/234).

== See also ==
- List of NBA career scoring leaders
- List of NBA career turnovers leaders
- List of NBA career 3-point scoring leaders
- List of NBA career 3-point field goal percentage leaders
- List of NBA career free throw percentage leaders
- List of NBA career games played leaders
- List of NBA career minutes played leaders
- List of NBA career playoff 3-point scoring leaders
- List of NBA career playoff games played leaders
- List of NBA single-game playoff scoring leaders
