= 2012–13 Euroleague Regular Season Group C =

Basketball tournament

Standings and Results for Group C of the Regular Season phase of the 2012–13 Euroleague basketball tournament.

== Standings ==
Pos	Team	Pld	W	L	PF	PA	PD	Qualification
1	(Lithuania) Žalgiris	10	8	2	804	693	+111	Advance to Top 16
2	(Greece) Olympiacos	10	8	2	788	737	+51	Advance to Top 16
3	(Turkey) Anadolu Efes	10	5	5	738	740	−2	Advance to Top 16
4	(Spain) Caja Laboral	10	4	6	749	778	−29	Advance to Top 16
5	(Italy) EA7 Milano	10	3	7	760	767	−7	
6	(Croatia) Cedevita	10	2	8	725	849	−124	

Source: Euroleague

== Fixtures/results ==
All times given below are in Central European Time.

=== Game 1 ===
11 October 2012
18:45

Report

Žalgiris (Lithuania)	90–62	(Croatia) Cedevita
Scoring by quarter: 27–20, 28–18, 24–15, 11–9
Pts: Jankūnas 20; Rebs: Lavrinovič 5 Asts: Popović 5		Pts: Gelabale 16; Rebs: Gelabale 4 Asts: Green 4

Žalgiris Arena, Kaunas
Attendance: 12,420
Referees: Guerrino Cerebuch (ITA), Marek Cmikiewicz (POL), Moritz Reiter (GER)

11 October 2012
20:00

Report

Olympiacos (Greece)	85–81	(Spain) Caja Laboral
Scoring by quarter: 18–23, 30–14, 17–29, 20–15
Pts: Printezis 17; Rebs: Hines 6 Asts: Spanoulis 6		Pts: Lampe 18; Rebs: Three players 5 Asts: Heurtel 5

Peace and Friendship Stadium, Piraeus
Attendance: 8,000
Referees: Luigi Lamonica (ITA), Eddie Viator (FRA), Zdravko Rutesic (MNE)

12 October 2012
20:45

Report

EA7 Milano (Italy)	80–75	(Turkey) Anadolu Efes
Scoring by quarter: 18–15, 22–19, 24–16, 16–25
Pts: Bourousis 23; Rebs: Bourousis 7 Asts: Hairston 8		Pts: Farmar 19; Rebs: Savanović 7 Asts: Gordon 4

Mediolanum Forum, Milan
Attendance: 4,000
Referees: Juan Carlos Arteaga (ESP), Fernando Rocha (POR), Spiros Gkontas (GRE)

=== Game 2 ===
19 October 2012
18:30

Report

Cedevita (Croatia)	71–83	(Italy) EA7 Milano
Scoring by quarter: 16–19, 21–21, 16–16, 18–27
Pts: Gelabale 20; Rebs: Gelabale 8 Asts: Green 5		Pts: Langford 17; Rebs: Fotsis, Bourousis 8 Asts: Cook 6

Dom Sportova, Zagreb
Attendance: 3,000
Referees: José Martín (ESP), Nicola Maestre (FRA), Boris Shulga (UKR)

19 October 2012
19:00

Report

Anadolu Efes (Turkey)	98–72	(Greece) Olympiacos
Scoring by quarter: 30–13, 24–19, 20–25, 24–15
Pts: Farmar 25; Rebs: Farmar, Erden 8 Asts: Farmar 9		Pts: Spanoulis 14; Rebs: Hines 9 Asts: Spanoulis 4

Abdi İpekçi Arena, Istanbul
Attendance: 6,212
Referees: Dani Hierrezuelo (ESP), Olegs Latisevs (LAT), Radomir Vojinovic (MNE)

19 October 2012
20:30

Report

Caja Laboral (Spain)	71–77	(Lithuania) Žalgiris
Scoring by quarter: 25–23, 10–17, 16–17, 20–20
Pts: Nocioni, Oleson 13; Rebs: San Emeterio 6 Asts: Heurtel 4		Pts: Darden 17; Rebs: Darden, Jankūnas 5 Asts: Lavrinovič 4

Fernando Buesa Arena, Vitoria-Gasteiz
Attendance: 10,616
Referees: Robert Lottermoser (GER), Tolga Şahin (ITA), Gianluca Mattioli (ITA)

=== Game 3 ===
25 October 2012
20:30

Report

EA7 Milano (Italy)	85–95	(Spain) Caja Laboral
Scoring by quarter: 19–18, 25–25, 22–22, 19–30
Pts: Bourousis 22; Rebs: Bourousis 11; Asts: Cook 5		Pts: Bjelica 20; Rebs: Bjelica 9 Asts: San Emeterio 6

Mediolanum Forum, Milan
Attendance: 2,900
Referees: Carl Jungebrand (FIN), Matej Boltauzer (SLO), Emin Moğulkoç (TUR)

25 October 2012
21:00

Report

Olympiacos (Greece)	61–79	(Lithuania) Žalgiris
Scoring by quarter: 17–14, 22–19, 10–26, 12–20
Pts: Hines 15; Rebs: Hines 8 Asts: Spanoulis 6		Pts: Popović 16; Rebs: Darden 7 Asts: Lafayette 4

Peace and Friendship Stadium, Piraeus
Attendance: 6,000
Referees: José Martín (ESP), Carmelo Paternico (ITA), Milija Vojinovic (SRB)

26 October 2012
19:45

Report

Anadolu Efes (Turkey)	85–66	(Croatia) Cedevita
Scoring by quarter: 23–14, 21–14, 22–19, 19–19
Pts: Vujačić 18; Rebs: Farmar, Gordon 6 Asts: Farmar 9		Pts: Wright, Green 14; Rebs: Bilan 7 Asts: Green 5

Abdi İpekçi Arena, Istanbul
Attendance: 3,297
Referees: Robert Lottermoser (GER), Paolo Taurino (ITA), Elias Koromilas (GRE)

=== Game 4 ===
1 November 2012
19:45

Report

Žalgiris (Lithuania)	92–87	(Italy) EA7 Milano
Scoring by quarter: 20–27, 27–24, 25–14, 20–22
Pts: Lafayette 17; Rebs: Jaaber, Jankūnas 5 Asts: Jaaber 4		Pts: Langford 24; Rebs: Fotsis, Cook 4 Asts: Cook 9

Žalgiris Arena, Kaunas
Attendance: 14,455
Referees: Sasa Pukl (SLO), Jakub Zamojski (POL), Petri Mantyla (FIN)

1 November 2012
20:45

Report

Caja Laboral (Spain)	64–76	(Turkey) Anadolu Efes
Scoring by quarter: 19–15, 29–15, 7–22, 9–24
Pts: Cabezas 12; Rebs: Bjelica 12; Asts: Heurtel 5		Pts: Farmar 18; Rebs: Farmar 6 Asts: Tunçeri 5

Fernando Buesa Arena, Vitoria-Gasteiz
Attendance: 11,119
Referees: Guerrino Cerebuch (ITA), Milivoje Jovcic (SRB), Joseph Bissang (FRA)

2 November 2012
21:00

Report

Olympiacos (Greece)	79–77	(Croatia) Cedevita
Scoring by quarter: 22–16, 20–19, 14–18, 23–24
Pts: Spanoulis 21; Rebs: Three players 7 Asts: Spanoulis 7		Pts: Bilan 16; Rebs: Suton 8 Asts: Wright 8

Peace and Friendship Stadium, Piraeus
Attendance: 3,500
Referees: Recep Ankaralı (TUR), Borys Ryzhyk (UKR), Rüştü Nuran (TUR)

=== Game 5 ===
8 November 2012
20:45

Report

EA7 Milano (Italy)	71–84	(Greece) Olympiacos
Scoring by quarter: 17–24, 19–17, 14–18, 21–25
Pts: Langford 17; Rebs: Bourousis 9 Asts: Cook 5		Pts: Spanoulis 23; Rebs: Mavroeidis 7 Asts: Spanoulis 9

Mediolanum Forum, Milan
Attendance: 4,000
Referees: Jose Ramon Garcia Ortiz (ESP), Milivoje Jovcic (SRB), Miguel Perez Perez (ESP)

9 November 2012
18:30

Report

Cedevita (Croatia)	76–69	(Spain) Caja Laboral
Scoring by quarter: 24–24, 15–10, 19–12, 18–23
Pts: Bilan 16; Rebs: Gelabale 9 Asts: Green 7		Pts: San Emeterio 15; Rebs: San Emeterio 7 Asts: Heurtel 4

Dražen Petrović Basketball Hall, Zagreb
Attendance: 3,500
Referees: Grzegorz Ziemblicki (POL), Roberto Chiari (ITA), Tomas Trawicki (POL)

9 November 2012
19:45

Report

Anadolu Efes (Turkey)	64–77	(Lithuania) Žalgiris
Scoring by quarter: 23–25, 14–12, 14–23, 13–17
Pts: Erden 20; Rebs: Gönlüm 7 Asts: Tunçeri 6		Pts: Popović 21; Rebs: Lavrinovič 6 Asts: Lafayette 3

Abdi İpekçi Arena, Istanbul
Attendance: 8,669
Referees: Christos Christodoulou (GRE), Vicente Bulto (ESP), Marius Ciulin (ROM)

=== Game 6 ===
15 November 2012
20:30

Report

Cedevita (Croatia)	108–106 (OT)	(Lithuania) Žalgiris
Scoring by quarter: 19–28, 20–12, 24–20, 22–25, Overtime: 23–21
Pts: Gelabale 23; Rebs: Gelabale 10; Asts: Suput 4		Pts: Lavrinovič 24; Rebs: Darden 7 Asts: Kaukėnas 7

Dražen Petrović Basketball Hall, Zagreb
Attendance: 3,500
Referees: Fernando Rocha (POR), Olegs Latisevs (LAT), Sergiy Chebyshev (UKR)

16 November 2012
20:30

Report

Caja Laboral (Spain)	72–89	(Greece) Olympiacos
Scoring by quarter: 19–22, 21–25, 11–22, 21–20
Pts: Oleson 13; Rebs: Heurtel, Lampe 6 Asts: Heurtel 6		Pts: Hines 18; Rebs: Papanikolaou 9 Asts: Spanoulis 8

Fernando Buesa Arena, Vitoria-Gasteiz
Attendance: 11,129
Referees: Ilija Belosevic (SRB), Jakub Zamojski (POL), Luis Lopes (POR)

16 November 2012
20:45

Report

Anadolu Efes (Turkey)	77–71	(Italy) EA7 Milano
Scoring by quarter: 20–18, 7–18, 27–16, 23–19
Pts: Vujačić 29; Rebs: Gönlüm 12; Asts: Farmar, Lucas 5		Pts: Langford 15; Rebs: Fotsis 6 Asts: Langford 6

Abdi İpekçi Arena, Istanbul
Attendance: 8,144
Referees: Sreten Radovic (CRO), Eddie Viator (FRA), Milija Vojinovic (SRB)

=== Game 7 ===
22 November 2012
20:45

Report

EA7 Milano (Italy)	75–60	(Croatia) Cedevita
Scoring by quarter: 20–18, 16–19, 25–9, 14–14
Pts: Fotsis 15; Rebs: Bourousis 12; Asts: Cook 6		Pts: Bilan 15; Rebs: Bilan 9 Asts: Ilievski 4

Mediolanum Forum, Milan
Attendance: 3,500
Referees: Christos Christodoulou (GRE), Apostolos Kalpakas (SWE), Ersan Kartal (TUR)

22 November 2012
21:45

Report

Olympiacos (Greece)	75–53	(Turkey) Anadolu Efes
Scoring by quarter: 23–20, 12–6, 24–16, 16–11
Pts: Papanikolaou 17; Rebs: Printezis 7 Asts: Spanoulis 4		Pts: Gordon 15; Rebs: Erden 10; Asts: Farmar 3

Peace and Friendship Stadium, Piraeus
Attendance: 7,000
Referees: Grzegorz Ziemblicki (POL), Matej Boltauzer (SLO), Nicola Maestre (FRA)

23 November 2012
19:45

Report

Žalgiris (Lithuania)	82–45	(Spain) Caja Laboral
Scoring by quarter: 22–15, 21–9, 16–9, 23–12
Pts: Popović 19; Rebs: Jankūnas 6 Asts: Jaaber, Delaš 3		Pts: Nocioni, Causeur 10; Rebs: Lampe 4 Asts: San Emeterio 4

Žalgiris Arena, Kaunas
Attendance: 15,110
Referees: Luigi Lamonica (ITA), Recep Ankarali (TUR), Marcin Kowalski (POL)

=== Game 8 ===
29 November 2012
18:30

Report

Cedevita (Croatia)	73–81	(Turkey) Anadolu Efes
Scoring by quarter: 24–21, 11–23, 20–15, 18–22
Pts: Wright 24; Rebs: Andrić 6 Asts: Wright, Green 3		Pts: Farmar 21; Rebs: Erden 10; Asts: Gordon 6

Dražen Petrović Basketball Hall, Zagreb
Attendance: 3,500
Referees: Luigi Lamonica (ITA), Oliver Krause (GER), Ioannis Foufis (GRE)

29 November 2012
20:30

Report

Caja Laboral (Spain)	64–62	(Italy) EA7 Milano
Scoring by quarter: 14–19, 14–23, 17–11, 19–9
Pts: San Emeterio 17; Rebs: Lampe 12; Asts: Heurtel 5		Pts: Langford 16; Rebs: Bourousis 10; Asts: Langford 4

Fernando Buesa Arena, Vitoria-Gasteiz
Attendance: 10,214
Referees: Sasa Pukl (SLO), Olegs Latisevs (LAT), Sergio Silva (POR)

30 November 2012
19:00

Report

Žalgiris (Lithuania)	63–77	(Greece) Olympiacos
Scoring by quarter: 18–21, 9–10, 23–17, 13–29
Pts: Kaukėnas 17; Rebs: Lavrinovič, Jankūnas 7 Asts: Lafayette 3		Pts: Spanoulis 16; Rebs: Hines, Papanikolaou 6 Asts: Spanoulis 6

Žalgiris Arena, Kaunas
Attendance: 15,420
Referees: Carl Jungebrand (FIN), Eddie Viator (FRA), Damir Javor (SLO)

=== Game 9 ===
6 December 2012
18:30

Report

Cedevita (Croatia)	62–84	(Greece) Olympiacos
Scoring by quarter: 18–21, 19–19, 11–24, 14–20
Pts: Ilievski 14; Rebs: Bilan 11; Asts: Baždarić 3		Pts: Spanoulis 14; Rebs: Printezis 7 Asts: Perperoglou 6

Dražen Petrović Basketball Hall, Zagreb
Attendance: 3,000
Referees: Juan Carlos Arteaga (ESP), Emilio Perez Pizarro (ESP), Gianluca Mattioli (ITA)

7 December 2012
19:00

Report

Anadolu Efes (Turkey)	76–91	(Spain) Caja Laboral
Scoring by quarter: 19–21, 15–17, 25–27, 17–26
Pts: Vujačić 21; Rebs: Erden 7 Asts: Four players 3		Pts: Heurtel 22; Rebs: Bjelica 8 Asts: Heurtel 4

Abdi İpekçi Arena, Istanbul
Attendance: 6,178
Referees: Carl Jungebrand (FIN), Sinisa Herceg (CRO), Boris Shulga (UKR)

7 November 2012
20:45

Report

EA7 Milano (Italy)	65–67	(Lithuania) Žalgiris
Scoring by quarter: 16–18, 21–14, 16–19, 12–16
Pts: Langford 20; Rebs: Fotsis, Langford 5 Asts: Cook, Langford 4		Pts: Jankūnas 16; Rebs: Darden, Lavrinovič 8 Asts: Jaaber 4

Mediolanum Forum, Milan
Attendance: 3,300
Referees: Ilija Belosevic (SRB), Dani Hierrezuelo (ESP), Rustu Nuran (TUR)

=== Game 10 ===
14 December 2012
20:00

Report

Olympiacos (Greece)	82–81	(Italy) EA7 Milano
Scoring by quarter: 16–19, 29–19, 17–24, 20–19
Pts: Spanoulis 18; Rebs: Hines 7 Asts: Law 5		Pts: Langford 21; Rebs: Bourousis 12; Asts: Three players 3

Peace and Friendship Stadium, Piraeus
Attendance: 8,500
Referees: Borys Ryzhyk (UKR), Robert Lottermoser (GER), Marcin Kowalski (POL)

14 December 2012
20:00

Report

Žalgiris (Lithuania)	71–53	(Turkey) Anadolu Efes
Scoring by quarter: 20–15, 15–15, 23–7, 13–16
Pts: Jankūnas 18; Rebs: Delaš 7 Asts: Popović 4		Pts: Gönlüm 13; Rebs: Barać 7 Asts: Three players 3

Žalgiris Arena, Kaunas
Attendance: 13,520
Referees: Sasa Pukl (SLO), Marko Juras (SRB), Tomasz Trawicki (POL)

14 December 2012
20:00

Report

Caja Laboral (Spain)	97–70	(Croatia) Cedevita
Scoring by quarter: 15–17, 34–13, 20–19, 28–21
Pts: Causeur 23; Rebs: Pleiß 8 Asts: Oleson, Causeur 4		Pts: Suton, Gelabale 12; Rebs: Suton 7 Asts: Wright, Ilievski 2

Fernando Buesa Arena, Vitoria-Gasteiz
Attendance: 14,419
Referees: Emin Mogulkoc (TUR), Robert Vyklicky (CZE), Tomas Jasevičius (LTU)
