= 2012–13 Euroleague Top 16 Group E =

Standings and Results for Group E of the Top 16 phase of the 2012–13 Turkish Airlines Euroleague basketball tournament.

== Standings ==
Pos	Team	Pld	W	L	PF	PA	PD	Qualification
1	(Russia) CSKA Moscow	14	11	3	1095	981	+114	Advance to quarterfinals
2	(Spain) Real Madrid	14	10	4	1085	1021	+64	Advance to quarterfinals
3	(Turkey) Anadolu Efes	14	9 (Note: Tiebreaker: 1–1 (+1).)	5	1028	1031	−3	Advance to quarterfinals
4	(Greece) Panathinaikos	14	9 (Note: Tiebreaker: 1–1 (−1).)	5	1001	968	+33	Advance to quarterfinals
5	(Spain) Unicaja	14	7	7	988	1015	−27	
6	(Lithuania) Žalgiris	14	6	8	1065	1040	+25	
7	(Germany) Alba Berlin	14	4	10	959	1036	−77	
8	(Germany) Brose Baskets	14	0	14	1026	1155	−129	

Source: Euroleague

== Fixtures and results ==
All times given below are in Central European Time.

=== Game 1 ===
27 December 2012
19:00

Report

Unicaja (Spain)	85–82	(Germany) Brose
Scoring by quarter: 15–19, 24–26, 24–24, 22–13
Pts: Williams 19; Rebs: Panko 7 Asts: Calloway 4		Pts: Ford 16; Rebs: Ford 6 Asts: Gavel 8

Palacio de Deportes José María Martín Carpena, Málaga
Attendance: 6,475
Referees: Recep Ankaralı (TUR), Sreten Radovic (CRO), Elias Koromilas (GRE)

27 December 2012
20:45

Report

Alba Berlin (Germany)	63–77	(Spain) Real Madrid
Scoring by quarter: 20–26, 14–12, 20–22, 9–17
Pts: Miralles 14; Rebs: Byars 9 Asts: three players 2		Pts: Llull 15; Rebs: Fernández 7 Asts: Llull 6

O2 World, Berlin
Attendance: 11,998
Referees: Dubravko Muhvic (CRO), Luis Lopes (POR), Carmelo Paternico (ITA)

28 December 2012
17:00

Report

CSKA Moscow (Russia)	90–71	(Turkey) Anadolu Efes
Scoring by quarter: 25–24, 17–18, 21–16, 27–13
Pts: Krstic, Weems 22; Rebs: Kaun, Khryapa 5 Asts: Khryapa 4		Pts: Farmar 24; Rebs: Erden 10; Asts: Farmar 6

CSKA Universal Sports Hall, Moscow
Attendance: 4,211
Referees: Dani Hierrezuelo (ESP), Borys Ryzhyk (UKR), Marcin Kowalski (POL)

28 December 2012
21:00

Report

Panathinaikos (Greece)	67–66	(Lithuania) Žalgiris
Scoring by quarter: 22–13, 21–20, 11–16, 13–17
Pts: Kapono 16; Rebs: Bramos, Tsartsaris 5 Asts: Ukić 8		Pts: Lavrinovič 13; Rebs: Jankūnas 6 Asts: Jaaber 3

O.A.C.A., Athens
Attendance: 10,122
Referees: Guerrino Cerebuch (ITA), Vicente Bulto (ESP), Nicola Maestre (FRA)

=== Game 2 ===
3 January 2013
20:45

Report

Brose (Germany)	67–82	(Spain) Real Madrid
Scoring by quarter: 22–26, 16–21, 19–16, 10–19
Pts: Nachbar 19; Rebs: Ford 7 Asts: Schmidt 3		Pts: Mirotić 19; Rebs: Reyes, Mirotić 8 Asts: Rodríguez 6

Stechert Arena, Bamberg
Attendance: 6,800
Referees: Luigi Lamonica (ITA), Srdan Dozai (CRO), Damir Javor (SLO)

3 January 2013
20:45

Report

Anadolu Efes (Turkey)	78–64	(Greece) Panathinaikos
Scoring by quarter: 24–17, 21–15, 19–11, 14–21
Pts: Farmar 13; Rebs: Shipp 6 Asts: Gordon 5		Pts: Bramos 16; Rebs: Lasme 10; Asts: Kapono 4

Abdi İpekçi Arena, Istanbul
Attendance: 5,341
Referees: Ilija Belosevic (SRB), Emilio Perez Pizarro (ESP), Radomir Vojinovic (MNE)

4 January 2013
18:45

Report

Žalgiris (Lithuania)	75–63	(Spain) Unicaja
Scoring by quarter: 21–17, 13–13, 18–21, 23–12
Pts: Kuzminskas 14; Rebs: K. Lavrinovič 8 Asts: Jaaber 4		Pts: Calloway, Žorić 11; Rebs: Vázquez 7 Asts: Simon 4

Žalgiris Arena, Kaunas
Attendance: 13,015
Referees: Robert Lottermoser (GER), Andrej Jersan (SLO), Joseph Bissang (FRA)

4 January 2013
19:00

Report

Alba Berlin (Germany)	57–75	(Russia) CSKA Moscow
Scoring by quarter: 13–24, 15–16, 19–17, 10–18
Pts: Wood 14; Rebs: Thompson, Miralles 4 Asts: Đedović 3		Pts: Teodosić 17; Rebs: Khryapa 10; Asts: Khryapa 4

O2 World, Berlin
Attendance: 9,167
Referees: Juan Carlos Arteaga (ESP), Emin Mogulkoc (TUR), Marek Cmikiewicz (POL)

=== Game 3 ===
10 January 2013
17:00

Report

CSKA Moscow (Russia)	90–83	(Germany) Brose
Scoring by quarter: 22–24, 23–22, 22–18, 23–19
Pts: Khryapa 19; Rebs: Khryapa 14; Asts: Teodosić 9		Pts: Nachbar 35; Rebs: Jacobsen, Zirbes 7 Asts: Jacobsen 4

Megasport Arena, Moscow
Attendance: 4,879
Referees: Juan Carlos Garcia Gonzalez (ESP), Petri Mantyla (FIN), Ioannis Foufis (GRE)

10 January 2013
19:45

Report

Panathinaikos (Greece)	78–73	(Spain) Unicaja
Scoring by quarter: 23–19, 16–18, 17–21, 22–15
Pts: Gist 17; Rebs: Lasme 9 Asts: Diamantidis 8		Pts: Calloway 14; Rebs: Perović 13; Asts: Calloway 2

O.A.C.A., Athens
Attendance: 7,056
Referees: Borys Ryzhyk (UKR), Milija Vojinovic (SRB), Gianluca Mattioli (ITA)

11 January 2013
19:00

Report

Anadolu Efes (Turkey)	71–62	(Germany) Alba Berlin
Scoring by quarter: 16–19, 19–11, 17–14, 19–18
Pts: Farmar, Savanović 15; Rebs: four players 4 Asts: Lucas 6		Pts: Thompson 15; Rebs: Thompson 11; Asts: Wood 5

Abdi İpekçi Arena, Istanbul
Attendance: 3,931
Referees: Luigi Lamonica (ITA), Miguel Perez Perez (ESP), Tomas Jasevicius (LTU)

11 January 2013
20:45

Report

Real Madrid (Spain)	75–74	(Lithuania) Žalgiris
Scoring by quarter: 18–23, 22–17, 14–12, 21–22
Pts: Mirotić 17; Rebs: Reyes 8 Asts: Fernández, Llull 4		Pts: Popović 21; Rebs: K. Lavrinovič 6 Asts: Popović, K. Lavrinovič 3

Palacio de Deportes, Madrid
Attendance: 9,187
Referees: Christos Christodoulou (GRE), Matej Boltauzer (SLO), Robert Vyklicky (CZE)

=== Game 4 ===
16 January 2013
20:00

Report

Alba Berlin (Germany)	73–79	(Greece) Panathinaikos
Scoring by quarter: 23-23, 16–22, 17–20, 17–14
Pts: Đedović 21; Rebs: Foster 5 Asts: Wood, Foster 3		Pts: Mačiulis 28; Rebs: Bramos 5 Asts: Bramos 6

O2 World, Berlin
Attendance: 8,166
Referees: Dani Hierrezuelo (ESP), Srdan Dozai (CRO), Roberto Chiari (ITA)

17 January 2013
19:00

Report

Brose Baskets Bamberg (Germany)	76–94	(Turkey) Anadolu Efes
Scoring by quarter: 27–23, 19–24, 13–18, 17–29
Pts: Nachbar 19; Rebs: Jacobsen 4 Asts: Goldsberry 4		Pts: Vujačić 17; Rebs: Vujačić 8 Asts: Farmar 7

Stechert Arena, Bamberg
Attendance: 6,800
Referees: Antonio Conde (ESP), Jakub Zamojski (POL), Panagiotis Anastopoulos (GRE)

17 January 2013
20:45

Report

Unicaja (Spain)	64–72	(Spain) Real Madrid
Scoring by quarter: 16–19, 20–11, 14–13, 14–29
Pts: Simon 16; Rebs: three players 4 Asts: Williams, Calloway 3		Pts: Fernández 15; Rebs: Slaughter 8 Asts: Llull 5

Palacio de Deportes José María Martín Carpena, Málaga
Attendance: 8,300
Referees: Fernando Rocha (POR), Eddie Viator (FRA), Olegs Latisevs (LAT)

17 January 2013
20:45

Report

Žalgiris (Lithuania)	73–87	(Russia) CSKA Moscow
Scoring by quarter: 15–16, 16–22, 20–27, 22-22
Pts: Popović 16; Rebs: Jankūnas 6 Asts: Jaaber, Jankūnas 2		Pts: Teodosić 24; Rebs: Khryapa 6 Asts: Khryapa 8

Žalgiris Arena, Kaunas
Attendance: 15,799
Referees: Sasa Pukl (SLO), Tolga Sahin (ITA), Luis Lopes (POR)

=== Game 5 ===
24 January 2013
20:30

Report

Alba Berlin (Germany)	82–63	(Germany) Brose
Scoring by quarter: 26–14, 10–20, 28–13, 18–16
Pts: Đedović 20; Rebs: Thompson, Đedović 8 Asts: Wood 4		Pts: Nachbar 15; Rebs: Zirbes 8 Asts: Jacobsen, Gavel 3

O2 World, Berlin
Attendance: 8,533
Referees: Juan Carlos Garcia Gonzalez (ESP), Olegs Latisevs (LAT), Gianluca Mattioli (ITA)

25 January 2013
17:00

Report

CSKA Moscow (Russia)	81–94	(Spain) Unicaja
Scoring by quarter: 17–27, 26–20, 18–23, 20–24
Pts: Krstić 23; Rebs: Krstić 6 Asts: Teodosić 8		Pts: Williams 28; Rebs: Lima 5 Asts: Simon 5

CSKA Universal Sports Hall, Moscow
Attendance: 4,849
Referees: Guerrino Cerebuch (ITA), Marko Juras (SRB), Zdravko Rutesic (MNE)

25 January 2013
19:00

Report

Anadolu Efes (Turkey)	56–52	(Lithuania) Žalgiris
Scoring by quarter: 15–8, 12–15, 14–13, 15–16
Pts: Vujačić 12; Rebs: Erden 9 Asts: Gordon 5		Pts: Darden, Kuzminskas 10; Rebs: Jankūnas 8 Asts: Jankūnas 5

Abdi İpekçi Arena, Istanbul
Attendance: 8,239
Referees: Grzegorz Ziemblicki (POL), Sreten Radovic (CRO), Anastasios Piloidis (GRE)

25 January 2013
20:00

Report

Panathinaikos (Greece)	54–58	(Spain) Real Madrid
Scoring by quarter: 20–11, 17–16, 12–17, 5–14
Pts: Bramos 11; Rebs: Three players 7 Asts: Diamantidis 6		Pts: Reyes 13; Rebs: Four players 5 Asts: Rodríguez 3

O.A.C.A., Athens
Attendance: 14,909
Referees: Tolga Sahin (ITA), Robert Lottermoser (GER), Rustu Nuran (TUR)

=== Game 6 ===
31 January 2013
18:45

Report

Žalgiris (Lithuania)	92–56	(Germany) Alba Berlin
Scoring by quarter: 26–21, 18–16, 26–9, 22–10
Pts: Popović 22; Rebs: Delaš 6 Asts: Popović, Lafayette 5		Pts: Idbihi 12; Rebs: Morley 6 Asts: Đedović 4

Žalgiris Arena, Kaunas
Attendance: 10,190
Referees: Recep Ankarali (TUR), Radomir Vojinovic (MNE), Panagiotis Anastopoulos (GRE)

31 January 2013
20:45

Report

Real Madrid (Spain)	86–78 (OT)	(Russia) CSKA Moscow
Scoring by quarter: 14–15, 19–12, 10–17, 23–22, Overtime: 20–12
Pts: Carroll 31; Rebs: Fernández 13; Asts: Fernández 5		Pts: Teodosić, Erceg 13; Rebs: Khryapa 9 Asts: Teodosić 4

Palacio de Deportes, Madrid
Attendance: 12,888
Referees: Grzegorz Ziemblicki (POL), Milija Vojinovic (SRB), Elias Koromilas (GRE)

1 February 2013
19:45

Report

Unicaja (Spain)	73–78	(Turkey) Anadolu Efes
Scoring by quarter: 16–22, 12–16, 26–17, 19–23
Pts: Žorić 20; Rebs: Calloway 7 Asts: Williams 6		Pts: Farmar 15; Rebs: Gönlüm 10; Asts: Farmar 5

Palacio de Deportes José María Martín Carpena, Málaga
Attendance: 3,500
Referees: Ilija Belosevic (SRB), Spiros Gkontas (GRE), Carmelo Paternico (ITA)

1 February 2013
21:00

Report

Panathinaikos (Greece)	76–73	(Germany) Brose
Scoring by quarter: 19–19, 17–14, 15–16, 25–24
Pts: Bramos 16; Rebs: Lasme 9 Asts: Diamantidis 9		Pts: Nachbar 16; Rebs: Ford 14; Asts: Tadda 4

O.A.C.A., Athens
Attendance: 5,000
Referees: Sasa Pukl (SLO), Eddie Viator (FRA), Marcin Kowalski (POL)

=== Game 7 ===
14 February 2013
17:00

Report

CSKA Moscow (Russia)	86–69	(Greece) Panathinaikos
Scoring by quarter: 25–15, 10–16, 31–19, 20–19
Pts: Teodosić 20; Rebs: Kaun 8 Asts: Teodosić 7		Pts: Mačiulis 15; Rebs: Gist 10; Asts: Diamantidis 6

CSKA Universal Sports Hall, Moscow
Attendance: 4,807
Referees: Ilija Belosevic (SRB), Matej Boltauzer (SLO), Damir Javor (SLO)

14 February 2013
19:00

Report

Alba Berlin (Germany)	65–67	(Spain) Unicaja
Scoring by quarter: 20–22, 22–12, 9–21, 14–12
Pts: Thompson, Đedović 16; Rebs: Thompson 9 Asts: Morley 4		Pts: Simon 12; Rebs: Dragić, Žorić 5 Asts: Simon 3

O2 World, Berlin
Attendance: 8,477
Referees: Sasa Pukl (SLO), Jakub Zamojski (POL), Anastasios Piloidis (GRE)

14 February 2013
20:45

Report

Anadolu Efes (Turkey)	74–72	(Spain) Real Madrid
Scoring by quarter: 23–19, 23–17, 13–18, 15–18
Pts: Lucas 16; Rebs: Savanović 8 Asts: Lucas 5		Pts: Fernández 14; Rebs: Fernández, Mirotić 7 Asts: Fernández 6

Abdi İpekçi Arena, Istanbul
Attendance: 10,072
Referees: Christos Christodoulou (GRE), Nicola Maestre (FRA), Marcin Kowalski (POL)

14 February 2013
20:45

Report

Brose (Germany)	87–88 (OT)	(Lithuania) Žalgiris
Scoring by quarter: 20–23, 16–15, 19-19, 21–19, Overtime: 11–12
Pts: Gavel 25; Rebs: Gavel, Ford 5 Asts: Goldsberry 6		Pts: Popović 21; Rebs: Kaukėnas 6 Asts: Lafayette 6

Stechert Arena, Bamberg
Attendance: 6,800
Referees: Milijove Jovcic (SRB), Spiros Gkontas (GRE), Roberto Chiari (ITA)

=== Game 8 ===
21 February 2013
20:45

Report

Brose (Germany)	65–68	(Spain) Unicaja
Scoring by quarter: 14–16, 14–22, 13–17, 24–13
Pts: Nachbar 17; Rebs: Ford, Walsh 5 Asts: Goldsberry 3		Pts: Žorić 26; Rebs: Calloway 10; Asts: three players 3

Stechert Arena, Bamberg
Attendance: 6,800
Referees: Recep Ankarali (TUR), Matej Boltauzer (SLO), Robert Vyklicky (CZE)

21 February 2013
20:45

Report

Žalgiris (Lithuania)	73–78	(Greece) Panathinaikos
Scoring by quarter: 22–19, 21-21, 15–16, 15–22
Pts: Lafayette 15; Rebs: D. Lavrinovič 6 Asts: Lafayette 5		Pts: Ukić 21; Rebs: Gist 9 Asts: Diamantidis 10

Žalgiris Arena, Kaunas
Attendance: 13,315
Referees: Luigi Lamonica (ITA), Srdan Dozai (CRO), Olegs Latisevs (LAT)

22 February 2013
19:00

Report

Anadolu Efes (Turkey)	63–60	(Russia) CSKA Moscow
Scoring by quarter: 16–22, 10–12, 15–12, 22–14
Pts: Farmar 15; Rebs: Lucas 11; Asts: Tunçeri 4		Pts: Teodosić 26; Rebs: Kaun 9 Asts: Weems 7

Abdi İpekçi Arena, Istanbul
Attendance: 11,350
Referees: Sasa Pukl (SLO), Robert Lottermoser (GER), Panagiotis Anastopoulos (GRE)

22 February 2013
20:45

Report

Real Madrid (Spain)	77–72	(Germany) Alba Berlin
Scoring by quarter: 20–14, 14–19, 14–17, 29–22
Pts: Carroll 16; Rebs: Mirotić, Hettsheimeir 7 Asts: Rodríguez 6		Pts: Thompson 14; Rebs: Idbihi 9 Asts: Đedović 3

Palacio de Deportes, Madrid
Attendance: 7,849
Referees: Sreten Radovic (CRO), Paolo Taurino (ITA), Boris Shulga (UKR)

=== Game 9 ===
28 February 2013
20:45

Report

Real Madrid (Spain)	76–73	(Germany) Brose
Scoring by quarter: 21–20, 18–21, 18–19, 19–13
Pts: Carroll 11; Rebs: Fernández 11; Asts: Fernández 4		Pts: Gavel 15; Rebs: Zirbes, Walsh 6 Asts: Gavel 5

Palacio de Deportes, Madrid
Attendance: 6,142
Referees: Borys Ryzhyk (UKR), Srdan Dozai (CRO), Anastasios Piloidis (GRE)

1 March 2013
17:00

Report

CSKA Moscow (Russia)	80–65	(Germany) Alba Berlin
Scoring by quarter: 20–16, 24–17, 19–21, 17–11
Pts: Krstić 20; Rebs: Three players 6 Asts: Jackson 5		Pts: Wood 11; Rebs: Byars, Traore 6 Asts: Wood 5

CSKA Universal Sports Hall, Moscow
Attendance: 4,122
Referees: Fernando Rocha (POR), Emilio Perez Pizarro (ESP), Apostolos Kalpakas (SWE)

1 March 2013
20:45

Report

Unicaja (Spain)	67–83	(Lithuania) Žalgiris
Scoring by quarter: 19–16, 12–22, 25–21, 11–24
Pts: Simon 13; Rebs: Žorić 7 Asts: Williams 4		Pts: Kuzminskas 15; Rebs: Kuzminskas 8 Asts: Popović 3

Palacio de Deportes José María Martín Carpena, Málaga
Attendance: 4,200
Referees: Guerrino Cerebuch (ITA), Tolga Sahin (ITA), Damir Javor (SLO)

1 March 2013
21:00

Report

Panathinaikos (Greece)	75–62	(Turkey) Anadolu Efes
Scoring by quarter: 19–21, 19–17, 18–13, 19–11
Pts: Ukić, Diamantidis 13; Rebs: Ukić 9 Asts: Ukić, Diamantidis 5		Pts: Savanović 21; Rebs: Three players 5 Asts: Farmar 7

O.A.C.A., Athens
Attendance: 12,517
Referees: Dani Hierrezuelo (ESP), Milivoje Jovcic (SRB), Joseph Bissang (FRA)

=== Game 10 ===
6 March 2013
19:00

Report

Alba Berlin (Germany)	86–91	(Turkey) Anadolu Efes
Scoring by quarter: 24–28, 22–22, 22–18, 18–23
Pts: Wood 24; Rebs: Idbihi 4 Asts: Đedović 6		Pts: Farmar 23; Rebs: Erden 8 Asts: Gordon 6

O2 World, Berlin
Attendance: 10,788
Referees: José Martín (ESP), Srdan Dozai (CRO), Damir Javor (SLO)

6 March 2013
20:45

Report

Brose (Germany)	58–78	(Russia) CSKA Moscow
Scoring by quarter: 18–23, 17–23, 12–16, 11–16
Pts: Ford 16; Rebs: Walsh 8 Asts: Gavel 4		Pts: Micov, Krstić 17; Rebs: Vorontsevich 11; Asts: Teodosić 8

Stechert Arena, Bamberg
Attendance: 6,800
Referees: Juan Carlos Arteaga (ESP), Boris Shulga (UKR), Ioannis Foufis (GRE)

7 March 2013
18:45

Report

Žalgiris (Lithuania)	104–105 (OT)	(Spain) Real Madrid
Scoring by quarter: 29–20, 15–21, 17–23, 23–21, Overtime: 20–21
Pts: Darden 20; Rebs: three players 5 Asts: Lafayette 5		Pts: Mirotić 31; Rebs: Mirotić 11; Asts: Rodríguez 8

Žalgiris Arena, Kaunas
Attendance: 15,010
Referees: Ilija Belosevic (SRB), Recep Ankarali (TUR), Matej Boltauzer (SLO)

8 March 2013
19:45

Report

Unicaja (Spain)	66–60	(Greece) Panathinaikos
Scoring by quarter: 8–16, 18–19, 18–18, 22–7
Pts: Williams 22; Rebs: Žorić 9 Asts: Williams 3		Pts: Mačiulis 15; Rebs: Gist 8 Asts: Diamantidis 7

Palacio de Deportes José María Martín Carpena, Málaga
Attendance: 4,500
Referees: Fernando Rocha (POR), Robert Lottermoser (GER), Eddie Viator (FRA)

=== Game 11 ===
14 March 2013
19:00

Report

Anadolu Efes (Turkey)	89–86 (OT)	(Germany) Brose
Scoring by quarter: 23–14, 21–23, 15–21, 17–18, Overtime: 13–10
Pts: Farmar 29; Rebs: Farmar 7 Asts: Gordon 11		Pts: Nachbar 24; Rebs: Massey 6 Asts: Jacobsen 8

Abdi İpekçi Arena, Istanbul
Attendance: 10,024
Referees: Guerrino Cerebuch (ITA), Miguel Perez Perez (ESP), Tomas Jacevicius (LTU)

15 March 2013
17:00

Report

CSKA Moscow (Russia)	70–61	(Lithuania) Žalgiris
Scoring by quarter: 17–12, 18–14, 13–22, 22–13
Pts: Weems 13; Rebs: Krstić, Khryapa 8 Asts: Papaloukas 6		Pts: Kaukėnas 16; Rebs: Lafayette 7 Asts: Kaukėnas 5

CSKA Universal Sports Hall, Moscow
Attendance: 4,517
Referees: Christos Christodoulou (GRE), Sreten Radovic (CRO), Jakub Zamojski (POL)

15 March 2013
19:45

Report

Real Madrid (Spain)	74–77	(Spain) Unicaja
Scoring by quarter: 21–15, 19–17, 13–28, 21–17
Pts: Rodríguez 17; Rebs: Mirotić 8 Asts: Rodríguez 6		Pts: Žorić 21; Rebs: Žorić 12; Asts: five players 2

Palacio de Deportes, Madrid
Attendance: 7,946
Referees: Sasa Pukl (SLO), Panagiotis Anastopoulos (GRE), Tomasz Trawicki (POL)

15 March 2013
20:00

Report

Panathinaikos (Greece)	82–58	(Germany) Alba Berlin
Scoring by quarter: 21–11, 29–17, 17–9, 15–21
Pts: Mačiulis 16; Rebs: Mačiulis 6 Asts: Diamantidis 9		Pts: Wood 9 Rebs: Thompson 7 Asts: Đedović, Foster 3

O.A.C.A., Athens
Attendance: 6,000
Referees: Juan Carlos Garcia Gonzalez (ESP), Luis Lopes (POR), Carmelo Paternico (ITA)

=== Game 12 ===
20 March 2013
20:45

Report

Brose (Germany)	72–75	(Germany) Alba Berlin
Scoring by quarter: 19–21, 23–21, 16–17, 14–16
Pts: Ford 16; Rebs: Ford 9 Asts: Walsh 5		Pts: Thompson 15; Rebs: Thompson, Traore 5 Asts: Đedović 7

Stechert Arena, Bamberg
Attendance: 6,800
Referees: Dani Hierrezuelo (ESP), Roberto Chiari (ITA), Gianluca Mattioli (ITA)

21 March 2013
18:45

Report

Žalgiris (Lithuania)	79–71	(Turkey) Anadolu Efes
Scoring by quarter: 25–27, 19–15, 19–14, 16–15
Pts: D Lavrinovič 24; Rebs: Kuzminskas 6 Asts: Lafayette 5		Pts: Gordon 14; Rebs: Gordon 7 Asts: three playets 3

Žalgiris Arena, Kaunas
Attendance: 11,680
Referees: Fernando Rocha (POR), Robert Lottermoser (GER), Elias Koromilas (GRE)

21 March 2013
20:45

Report

Real Madrid (Spain)	73–74	(Greece) Panathinaikos
Scoring by quarter: 14–17, 19–21, 20–11, 20–25
Pts: Fernández, Mirotić 17; Rebs: Reyes 9 Asts: Fernández 2		Pts: Tsartsaris 16; Rebs: Ukić 6 Asts: Diamantidis 8

Palacio de Deportes, Madrid
Attendance: 9,496
Referees: Luigi Lamonica (ITA), Paolo Taurino (ITA), Olegs Latisevs (LAT)

21 March 2013
20:45

Report

Unicaja (Spain)	66–70	(Russia) CSKA Moscow
Scoring by quarter: 17–16, 17–14, 18–22, 14–18
Pts: Williams 12; Rebs: Dragić 9 Asts: Calloway 2		Pts: Kaun 16; Rebs: Khryapa 8 Asts: Teodosić 5

Palacio de Deportes José María Martín Carpena, Málaga
Attendance: 8,550
Referees: Recep Ankarali (TUR), Milivoje Jovcic (SRB), Spiros Gkontas (GRE)

=== Game 13 ===
28 March 2013
17:45

Report

CSKA Moscow (Russia)	81–72	(Spain) Real Madrid
Scoring by quarter: 24–15, 20–13, 19–19, 18–25
Pts: Weems 21; Rebs: Khryapa 11; Asts: Teodosić 7		Pts: Fernández 24; Rebs: Fernández 6 Asts: Fernández, Rodríguez 3

CSKA Universal Sports Hall, Moscow
Attendance: 5,234
Referees: Fernando Rocha (POR), Robert Lottermoser (GER), Tolga Sahin (ITA)

28 March 2013
18:30

Report

Anadolu Efes (Turkey)	64–70	(Spain) Unicaja
Scoring by quarter: 16–19, 17–9, 14–22, 17–20
Pts: Farmar 13; Rebs: Gönlüm 7 Asts: Farmar 5		Pts: Williams 22; Rebs: Žorić 8 Asts: Williams 7

Abdi İpekçi Arena, Istanbul
Attendance: 10,884
Referees: Luigi Lamonica (ITA), Matej Boltauzer (SLO), Carmelo Paternico (ITA)

28 March 2013
20:45

Report

Brose (Germany)	60–82	(Greece) Panathinaikos
Scoring by quarter: 16–26, 11–16, 14–17, 19–23
Pts: Nachbar 14; Rebs: Walsh 8 Asts: Walsh 5		Pts: Mačiulis 24; Rebs: Gist 7 Asts: Ukić 6

Stechert Arena, Bamberg
Attendance: 6,800
Referees: Jose Ramon Garcia Ortiz (ESP), Recep Ankarali (TUR), Srdan Dozai (CRO)

29 March 2013
18:00

Report

Alba Berlin (Germany)	77–55	(Lithuania) Žalgiris
Scoring by quarter: 14–6, 27–15, 20–15, 16–19
Pts: Thompson 16; Rebs: Miralles 6 Asts: three players 3		Pts: Lavrinovič 15; Rebs: Javtokas 6 Asts: Lafayette 3

O2 World, Berlin
Attendance: 9,111
Referees: Sasa Pukl (SLO), Miguel Perez Perez (ESP), Apostolos Kalpakas (SWE)

=== Game 14 ===
4 April 2013
18:45

Report

Žalgiris (Lithuania)	90–81	(Germany) Brose
Scoring by quarter: 26–25, 24–20, 16–18, 24–18
Pts: K. Lavrinovič 20; Rebs: Kuzminskas 9 Asts: McGrath, Popović 6		Pts: Gavel 20; Rebs: Ford 7 Asts: Gavel 3

Žalgiris Arena, Kaunas
Attendance: 11,769
Referees: Dubravko Muhvic (CRO), Sergiy Zashchuk (UKR), Aare Halliko (EST)

4 April 2013
20:45

Report

Unicaja (Spain)	55–68	(Germany) Alba Berlin
Scoring by quarter: 13–24, 14–16, 11–12, 17–16
Pts: Urtasun, Žorić 12; Rebs: Calloway 5 Asts: Simon, Vidal 4		Pts: Foster 13; Rebs: Miralles 7 Asts: Foster, Miralles 4

Palacio de Deportes José María Martín Carpena, Málaga
Attendance: 4,260
Referees: Eddie Viator (FRA), Damir Javor (SLO), Rustu Nuran (TUR)

4 April 2013
20:45

Report

Panathinaikos (Greece)	63–69	(Russia) CSKA Moscow
Scoring by quarter: 11–14, 23–19, 16–14, 13–22
Pts: Bramos 18; Rebs: Bramos 5 Asts: Ukić 5		Pts: Khryapa 13; Rebs: Khryapa, Krstić 7 Asts: Khryapa 6

O.A.C.A., Athens
Attendance: 18,000
Referees: Guerrino Cerebuch (ITA), Emilio Perez Pizarro (ESP), Milija Vojinovic (SRB)

4 April 2013
20:45

Report

Real Madrid (Spain)	86–66	(Turkey) Anadolu Efes
Scoring by quarter: 25–14, 22–16, 18-18, 21–18
Pts: Llull 16; Rebs: Reyes, Mirotić 7 Asts: Rodríguez 7		Pts: Farmar 11; Rebs: Gönlüm 9 Asts: Farmar 3

Palacio de Deportes, Madrid
Attendance: 9,156
Referees: Ilija Belosevic (SRB), Sreten Radovic (CRO), Borys Ryzhyk (UKR)
