= Sasha Vujačić =

Slovenian basketball player (born 1984)

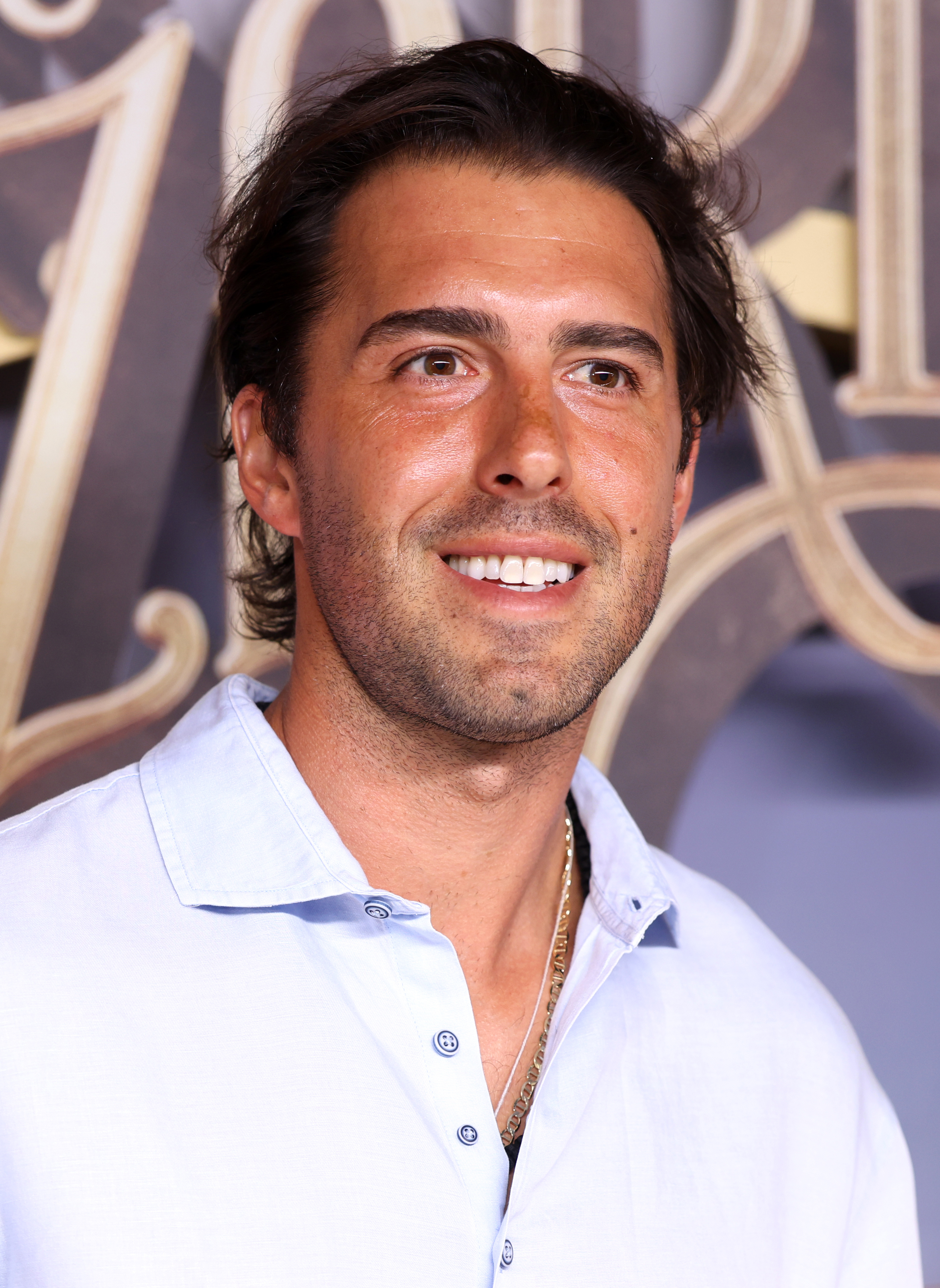
- Vujačić in 2025

Personal information
- Born: March 8, 1984 (age 42) Maribor, SR Slovenia, SFR Yugoslavia
- Listed height: 6 ft 7 in (2.01 m)
- Listed weight: 195 lb (88 kg)

Career information
- NBA draft: 2004: 1st round, 27th overall pick
- Drafted by: Los Angeles Lakers
- Playing career: 2001–2019
- Position: Shooting guard / point guard
- Number: 18, 20

Career history
- 2001–2004: Snaidero Udine
- 2004–2010: Los Angeles Lakers
- 2010–2011: New Jersey Nets
- 2011–2013: Anadolu Efes
- 2014: Los Angeles Clippers
- 2014: Reyer Venezia Mestre
- 2014: Laboral Kutxa
- 2015: İstanbul BB
- 2015–2017: New York Knicks
- 2017–2018: Auxilium Torino
- 2019: Scaligera Basket Verona

Career highlights
- 2× NBA champion (2009, 2010); 2× Turkish Basketball League All-Star (2012, 2013); TBL All-Star Game MVP (2012); Italian Cup champion (2018)
- Stats at NBA.com
- Stats at Basketball Reference

Aleksander "Sasha" Vujačić (Serbian Cyrillic: Александар Саша Вујачић; Slovene: Aleksandar Saša Vujačić; often rendered in English as without diacritics; born March 8, 1984) is a Slovenian former professional basketball player. He was selected by the Los Angeles Lakers in the first round of the 2004 NBA draft with the 27th overall pick. In the 2007–08 season, Vujačić set the Lakers record for the best three-point field goal percentage (.437) in a single season. In the 2009 and 2010 seasons, he won the NBA championship with the Lakers.

== Early career ==
From 1998 to 2000, Vujačić played for Branik and Polzela. The following year, he played for the Snaidero Udine junior team, before joining the senior team in 2001.

Vujačić played for the Slovenian junior national team and won a silver medal at the 2002 European Junior Championship.

== Professional career ==
=== Italy (2001–2004) ===
From 2001 to 2004, Vujačić played for Snaidero Udine of the Italian Lega Basket Serie A.

=== Los Angeles Lakers (2004–2010) ===
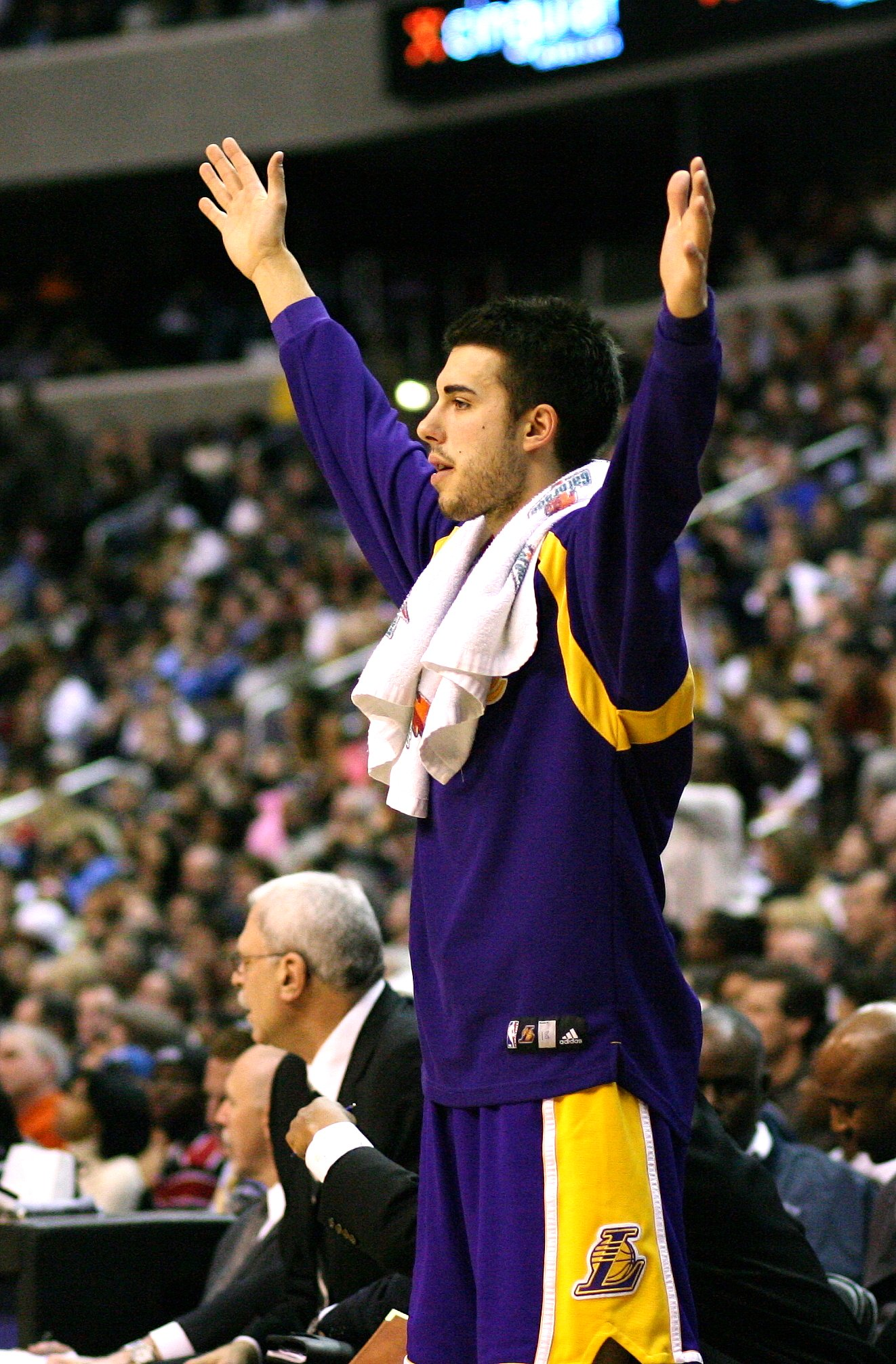
Vujačić with the Lakers in 2007

Vujačić was drafted by the Los Angeles Lakers with the 27th overall pick in the 2004 NBA draft. He signed a multi-year deal with the Lakers on July 20, 2004. He recorded a then-career high 22 points in a win over the Denver Nuggets on November 29, 2007. In the 2007–08 season, Vujačić made 118 of his 270 three-point field goal attempts, setting the Los Angeles Lakers single-season record for the best three-point field goal percentage (.437). During Game 3 of the 2008 NBA Finals, Vujačić scored a career playoff-high 20 points off the bench and was the only Laker, with the exception of Kobe Bryant, to score in double figures. The Lakers went on to lose the series in six games to the Boston Celtics.

On July 28, 2008, Vujačić re-signed with the Lakers on a multi-year deal. Los Angeles made it back to the NBA Finals to face the Orlando Magic. The Lakers defeated the Magic in the 2009 NBA Finals in a 4–1 series, earning Vujacic his first NBA championship.

In Game 6 of the 2010 NBA Finals, Vujačić led the Lakers' bench with 9 points, including two three-pointers. With 11 seconds left in Game 7 and the Lakers leading by two points, Vujačić made two free throws that sealed the Lakers' victory over the Celtics in a Game 7 for the first time in the longstanding Lakers–Celtics rivalry.

=== New Jersey Nets (2010–2011) ===
On December 15, 2010, Vujačić was traded to the New Jersey Nets in a three-team trade involving the Lakers and Houston Rockets. Vujačić tied his career high of 22 points on January 1, 2011. On February 9, 2011, Vujačić set a new career high with 25 points in a win over the then New Orleans Hornets.

=== Anadolu Efes (2011–2013) ===
In July 2011, he signed a one-year contract with the option for another year with Anadolu Efes. In his first Euroleague season he averaged 13.9 points and 3.3 rebounds per game.

On August 6, 2012, it was confirmed that Vujačić would stay with the team for one more season. In a Euroleague game against EA7 Milano on November 16, he scored 29 points, leading his team to a 77–71 victory. He averaged 12.8 points and 2.7 rebounds per game across ten regular season games. Vujačić helped Efes advance to the Top 16 round, edging Cedevita on the road by 81–73 in one of the most crucial games in group C.

=== Los Angeles Clippers (2014) ===
On February 3, 2014, Vujačić signed a 10-day contract with the Los Angeles Clippers. He did not re-sign with the Clippers after the first 10-day contract expired.

=== Reyer Venezia Mestre (2014–2015) ===
On March 25, 2014, Vujačić signed with Italian team Reyer Venezia Mestre for the rest of the 2013–14 season. He played 5 matches with the team, scoring 11 points per game.

=== Laboral Kutxa (2014–2015) ===
On October 28, 2014, Vujačić signed with the Spanish team Laboral Kutxa for the rest of 2014–15 season. He left the team on December 30, 2014.

=== Istanbul BB (2014–2015) ===
On January 2, 2015, he signed with İstanbul BB of Turkey for the rest of the 2014–15 Turkish Basketball League season.

=== New York Knicks (2015–2017) ===
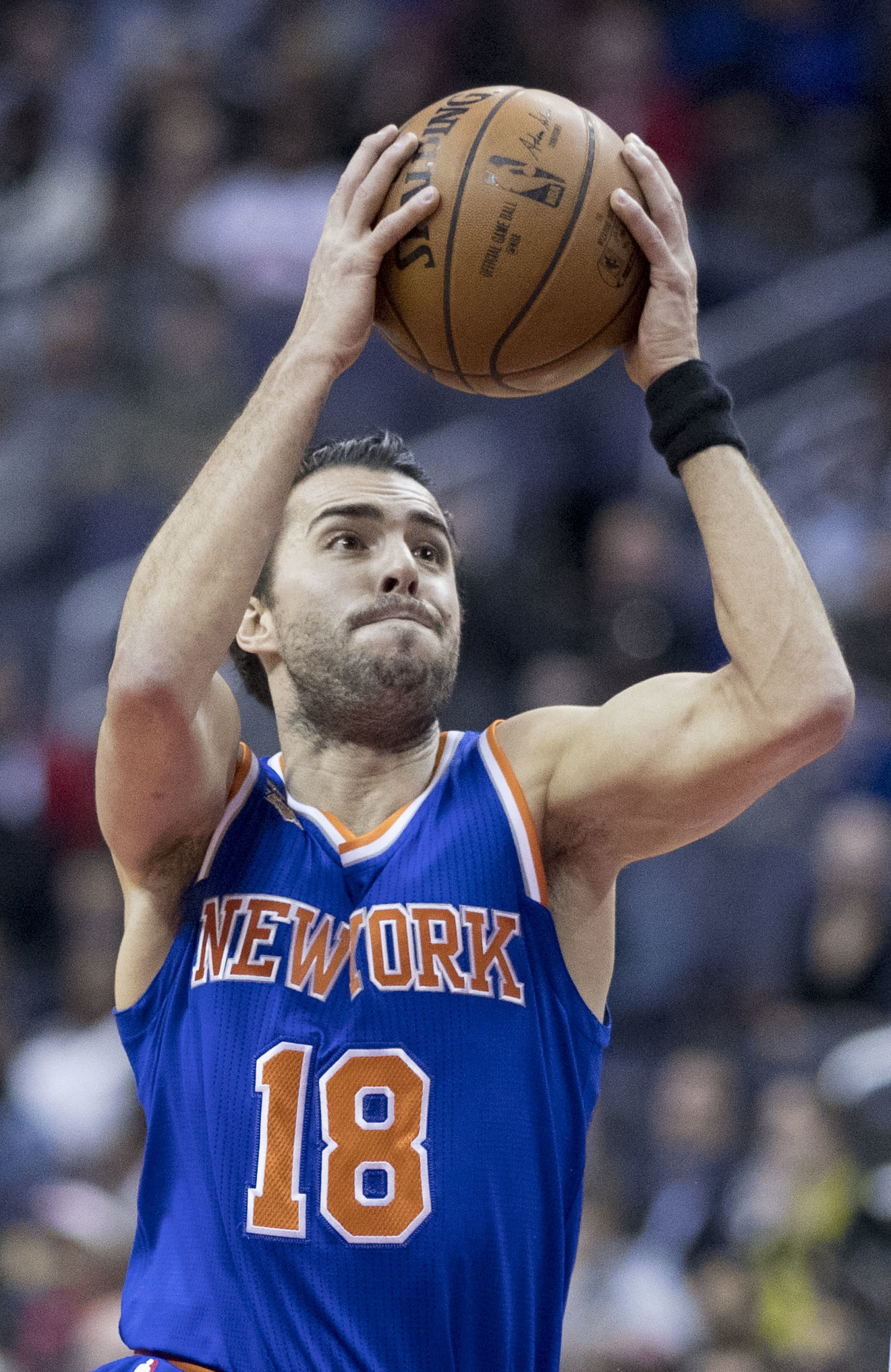
Vujačić playing for the Knicks in 2017

On August 7, 2015, Vujačić signed with the New York Knicks. He made his debut for the Knicks in the team's season opener against the Milwaukee Bucks on October 28, recording 11 points, 6 rebounds, 3 assists and 4 steals in a 122–97 win. On March 9, 2016, Vujačić scored a season-high 23 points to help the Knicks defeat the Phoenix Suns 128–97.

Vujačić re-signed with the Knicks on July 14, 2016. On February 1, 2017, he made Knicks history by converting two four-point plays during the Knicks 95–90 win over the Brooklyn Nets.

=== Auxilium Torino (2017–2018) ===
Vujačić signed with Italian club Auxilium Torino for the 2017–18 season on August 29, 2017. On February 18, 2018, Vujačić scored the game-winning layup to win the 2018 edition of the Italian Basketball Cup with Fiat Torino, beating Germani Basket Brescia 69–67 in the Finals.

== Career statistics ==
Legend
GP	Games played	GS	Games started	MPG	Minutes per game
FG%	Field goal percentage	3P%	3-point field goal percentage	FT%	Free throw percentage
RPG	Rebounds per game	APG	Assists per game	SPG	Steals per game
BPG	Blocks per game	PPG	Points per game	**Bold**	Career high
†	Won an NBA championship	*	Led the league

=== NBA ===
==== Regular season ====
Year	Team	GP	GS	MPG	FG%	3P%	FT%	RPG	APG	SPG	BPG	PPG
2004–05	L.A. Lakers	35	3	11.5	.282	.270	**.947**	1.8	1.5	.3	**.1**	2.9
2005–06	L.A. Lakers	**82***	4	17.7	.346	.343	.885	1.9	1.7	.6	.0	3.9
2006–07	L.A. Lakers	73	4	12.8	.392	.373	.878	1.5	.9	.6	.0	4.3
2007–08	L.A. Lakers	72	0	17.8	**.454**	**.437**	.835	2.1	1.0	.5	**.1**	8.8
2008–09†	L.A. Lakers	80	0	16.2	.387	.363	.921	1.7	1.4	**1.0**	**.1**	5.8
2009–10†	L.A. Lakers	67	1	8.6	.402	.309	.848	1.2	.6	.3	**.1**	2.8
2010–11	L.A. Lakers	11	0	4.9	.348	.429	.500	.4	.5	.1	.0	1.8
2010–11	New Jersey	56	17	**28.5**	.404	.369	.851	**3.3**	**2.3**	.9	**.1**	**11.4**
2013–14	L.A. Clippers	2	0	5.0	.400	.500	.000	1.5	.0	.5	.0	2.5
2015–16	New York	61	**25**	14.9	.383	.364	.821	2.4	1.4	.6	**.1**	4.9
2016–17	New York	42	4	9.7	.309	.311	.708	1.4	1.2	.3	.0	3.0
Career		581	58	15.3	.390	.367	.858	1.9	1.3	.6	.1	5.3

==== Playoffs ====
Year	Team	GP	GS	MPG	FG%	3P%	FT%	RPG	APG	SPG	BPG	PPG
2006	L.A. Lakers	7	0	18.4	.423	**.600**	**1.000**	**2.4**	**.9**	**.6**	.0	6.0
2007	L.A. Lakers	4	0	10.8	**.556**	.250	.000	1.0	.8	.3	.0	2.8
2008	L.A. Lakers	21	0	**21.7**	.399	.392	.857	2.2	.8	**.6**	**.2**	**8.1**
2009†	L.A. Lakers	**23**	0	10.9	.264	.314	.833	1.4	.5	.4	**.2**	3.0
2010†	L.A. Lakers	10	0	7.6	.435	.400	.833	.8	.5	.2	.0	3.1
Career		65	0	14.7	.366	.384	.879	1.6	.6	.4	.1	5.0

=== EuroLeague ===
Year	Team	GP	GS	MPG	FG%	3P%	FT%	RPG	APG	SPG	BPG	PPG	PIR
2011–12	Anadolu Efes	16	**16**	**29.0**	**.407**	.338	**.864**	**3.3**	**1.7**	**1.1**	**.2**	**13.9**	**12.2**
2012–13	Anadolu Efes	**24**	7	21.7	.376	**.376**	.758	3.0	1.0	.8	.1	9.1	8.3
2014–15	Laboral Kutxa	8	2	16.6	.304	.292	.667	1.9	.8	.3	.1	4.9	1.8
Career		48	25	23.3	.381	.349	.803	2.9	1.2	.8	.1	10.0	8.5

== Personal life ==
Vujačić was born in Maribor, Slovenia, to Montenegrin basketball player and coach Vaso Vujačić, and Slovenian volleyball player Ksenija.

His mother was playing volleyball for a top Yugoslav women's club, Branik Maribor, but quit her career at the age of 19 when she became pregnant with Sasha. His parents divorced when he was 2, and he lived with his mother and stepfather Goran Bjeković. He has two siblings, a sister named Nina, and a brother named Aljosa. In addition to playing basketball, he enjoys volleyball, tennis, and soccer.

He was once engaged to professional tennis player Maria Sharapova, but the two separated in 2012.

In early 2020, Vujačić's relationship with American TV presenter Kristine Leahy was revealed. The two initially met in October 2019 when he appeared as guest on her Fair Game interview program on Fox Sports 1 and subsequently became involved romantically.

== See also ==
- List of European basketball players in the United States
