= 2009 NBA Finals =

2009 basketball championship series

Team	Coach	Wins
Los Angeles Lakers	Phil Jackson	4
Orlando Magic	Stan Van Gundy	1
- Dates: June 4–14
- MVP: Kobe Bryant (Los Angeles Lakers)
- Hall of Famers: Lakers: Kobe Bryant (2020); Pau Gasol (2023); Magic: Dwight Howard (2025); Coaches: Phil Jackson (2007); Officials: Danny Crawford (2025)
- Eastern finals: Magic defeated Cavaliers, 4–2
- Western finals: Lakers defeated Nuggets, 4–2

The 2009 NBA Finals was the championship series of the National Basketball Association's (NBA) 2008–09 season and the conclusion of the season's playoffs. A best-of-seven playoff series starting on June 4 and concluding on June 14, 2009, it was contested between the Western Conference champion Los Angeles Lakers, and the Eastern Conference champion Orlando Magic. The Lakers were heavily favored to win the championship over the Magic.

The Lakers defeated the Magic in five games to win the franchise's 15th NBA championship. Kobe Bryant was named the Finals MVP. The Orlando Magic's Game 3 victory was the first win in an NBA Finals game in franchise history; they were previously swept in 1995 by the Houston Rockets.

This series was nicknamed the "Disney Series" for its connections to the Walt Disney related venues surrounding both cities. Walt Disney World is located 20 miles (32 km) from Orlando in nearby Lake Buena Vista, and Disneyland is located 30 miles (48 km) from Los Angeles in nearby Anaheim, with the Walt Disney Concert Hall 1.4 miles (2.3 km) north of the Staples Center.

== Background ==
The anticipation heading into the 2009 NBA playoffs was that the Finals would be a potential matchup between Kobe Bryant and LeBron James, who were regarded as the top players in the NBA at this point. However, the underdog Orlando Magic would end up shocking James' Cleveland Cavaliers in the Eastern Conference Finals in six games.

The two team captains (the Lakers' Kobe Bryant and the Magic's Dwight Howard) were teammates and starters on the United States men's national team the previous summer, winning a gold medal at the 2008 Summer Olympics in Beijing. Each player defeated another fellow Olympic starter in his respective conference final series: Bryant defeated Carmelo Anthony's Denver Nuggets and Howard advanced past LeBron James' aformentioned Cleveland Cavaliers.

=== 2009 NBA playoffs ===
Los Angeles Lakers (Western Conference champion)		Orlando Magic (Eastern Conference champion)
# / Western Conference; # / Team / W / L / PCT / GB; 1 / c-Los Angeles Lakers / 65 / 17 / .793 / —; 2 / y-Denver Nuggets / 54 / 28 / .659 / 11; 3 / y-San Antonio Spurs / 54 / 28 / .659 / 11; 4 / x-Portland Trail Blazers / 54 / 28 / .659 / 11; 5 / x-Houston Rockets / 53 / 29 / .646 / 12; 6 / x-Dallas Mavericks / 50 / 32 / .610 / 15; 7 / x-New Orleans Hornets / 49 / 33 / .598 / 16; 8 / x-Utah Jazz / 48 / 34 / .585 / 17; 9 / Phoenix Suns / 46 / 36 / .561 / 19; 10 / Golden State Warriors / 29 / 53 / .354 / 36; 11 / Memphis Grizzlies / 24 / 58 / .293 / 41; 12 / Minnesota Timberwolves / 24 / 58 / .293 / 41; 13 / Oklahoma City Thunder / 23 / 59 / .280 / 42; 14 / Los Angeles Clippers / 19 / 63 / .232 / 46; 15 / Sacramento Kings / 17 / 65 / .207 / 48; 1st seed in the West, 2nd best league record	Regular season	# / Eastern Conference; # / Team / W / L / PCT / GB; 1 / z-Cleveland Cavaliers / 66 / 16 / .805 / —; 2 / y-Boston Celtics / 62 / 20 / .756 / 4; 3 / y-Orlando Magic / 59 / 23 / .720 / 7; 4 / x-Atlanta Hawks / 47 / 35 / .573 / 19; 5 / x-Miami Heat / 43 / 39 / .524 / 23; 6 / x-Philadelphia 76ers / 41 / 41 / .500 / 25; 7 / x-Chicago Bulls / 41 / 41 / .500 / 25; 8 / x-Detroit Pistons / 39 / 43 / .476 / 27; 9 / Indiana Pacers / 36 / 46 / .439 / 30; 10 / Charlotte Bobcats / 35 / 47 / .427 / 31; 11 / New Jersey Nets / 34 / 48 / .415 / 32; 12 / Milwaukee Bucks / 34 / 48 / .415 / 32; 13 / Toronto Raptors / 33 / 49 / .402 / 33; 14 / New York Knicks / 32 / 50 / .390 / 34; 15 / Washington Wizards / 19 / 63 / .232 / 47; 3rd seed in the East, 4th best league record
Defeated the (8) Utah Jazz, 4–1	First round	Defeated the (6) Philadelphia 76ers, 4–2
Defeated the (5) Houston Rockets, 4–3	Conference semifinals	Defeated the (2) Boston Celtics, 4–3
Defeated the (2) Denver Nuggets, 4–2	Conference finals	Defeated the (1) Cleveland Cavaliers, 4–2

=== Los Angeles Lakers ===
The Lakers were the favorite to emerge from the Western Conference, but their road to the Finals was a tough one. They played three physical series against the Utah Jazz, Houston Rockets, and Denver Nuggets, winning in 5, 7, and 6 games, respectively. Going into the Finals, the Lakers finished off the Nuggets in the Western Conference finals with two good performances in Games 5 and 6, making analysts pick them as the favorites in the Finals. It was their sixth Finals appearance of the decade and a record-extending 30th Finals appearance overall, the most for any NBA team.

=== Orlando Magic ===
The Magic were overlooked by many to even reach the Eastern Conference finals, as they played in the shadows of the #1-seeded Cleveland Cavaliers, led by regular-season MVP LeBron James, and defending champion #2-seed Boston Celtics, though without star forward Kevin Garnett since February 19 due to an ACL injury. However, after dispatching the Philadelphia 76ers in six games, the Magic stunned the Celtics by winning Game 7 in Boston. The Celtics were previously 32–0 when leading a series 3–2, and 17–3 previously in Game 7s at home. Orlando assistant coach Patrick Ewing had publicly "guaranteed" that Orlando would win Game 7.

In the next round, Orlando was given little chance by many to defeat the top-seeded Cleveland Cavaliers, but a combination of three-point shooting and the inside presence of Dwight Howard created a matchup nightmare for Cleveland on defense, and Orlando ultimately won in six games. In Game 6, Howard's stellar performance with 40 points and 14 rebounds helped the franchise earn its second all-time Finals appearance and its first Finals appearance since 1995, where a Shaquille O'Neal and Penny Hardaway-led Magic were swept by the Hakeem Olajuwon and Clyde Drexler-led Houston Rockets.

=== Series preview ===
Although the Magic won both regular-season matchups with the Lakers, Los Angeles was able to take four out of five games in this series. Both regular-season games and three of the NBA Finals games were close contests, decided by six points or fewer or in overtime. The Lakers won Game 2 on June 7, 101–96 in overtime. Then they won Game 4 on June 11 in overtime as well.

Tyronn Lue, a backup point guard with Orlando, appeared with the Lakers during their initial championship run in the early 2000s and faced his former team in the finals. Lue and another backup point guard, Anthony Johnson were the only players on Orlando's roster with NBA Finals experience. However, neither saw playing time during the series, as Lue was inactive with an injury and Johnson lost his minutes to teammate Jameer Nelson, who returned from a shoulder injury in time for the Finals, where he led the Magic to sweep the Lakers in regular season. Trevor Ariza, the Lakers starting small forward, faced the team that traded him to the Lakers in 2007.

==== Regular-season series ====
The Orlando Magic won both games in the regular-season series:

December 20, 2008

Recap

Los Angeles Lakers 103, Orlando Magic 106

Amway Arena, Orlando, Florida

January 16, 2009

Recap

Orlando Magic 109, Los Angeles Lakers 103

Staples Center, Los Angeles, California

== Series summary ==
Starting this Finals, Sunday games are now moved up to 8:00 PM (ET) from the previous 9:00 PM (ET) timeslot.

Game	Date	Road team	Result	Home team
Game 1	June 4	Orlando Magic	75–100 (1–0)	Los Angeles Lakers
Game 2	June 7	Orlando Magic	96–101 (2–0)	Los Angeles Lakers
Game 3	June 9	Los Angeles Lakers	104–108 (2–1)	Orlando Magic
Game 4	June 11	Los Angeles Lakers	99–91 (3–1)	Orlando Magic
Game 5	June 14	Los Angeles Lakers	99–86 (4–1)	Orlando Magic

== Game summaries ==
All times are in Eastern Daylight Time (UTC−4). If the venue is located in a different time zone, the local time is also given.

=== Game 1 ===
ABC

June 4
9:00 p.m. (6:00 p.m. PDT)

Recap
Video highlights on YouTube

Orlando Magic 75, Los Angeles Lakers 100
Scoring by quarter: 24–22, 19–31, 15–29, 17–18
Pts: Mickaël Piétrus 14; Rebs: Dwight Howard 15; Asts: Jameer Nelson 4	Pts: Kobe Bryant 40; Rebs: Lamar Odom 14; Asts: Kobe Bryant 8
L.A. Lakers lead series, 1–0

Staples Center, Los Angeles, California
Attendance: 18,997
Referees:
- No. 43 Dan Crawford
- No. 14 Joe DeRosa
- No. 41 Ken Mauer

After an evenly battled first quarter, the Magic took the lead thanks to field goals and assists from point guard Jameer Nelson, who was playing his first game since injuring his shoulder during the regular season in February. Down 33–28 with 8:38 left in the 2nd quarter, the Lakers went on a 10–0 run and never looked back. The Lakers ended the 3rd quarter on a 25–10 run, led by the fierce play from Kobe Bryant, who finished with 40 points, 8 rebounds, and 8 assists, joining the likes of Shaquille O'Neal, Michael Jordan, and Jerry West to put up those numbers in a single NBA Finals game. The 25-point margin of victory was the 6th-largest in NBA Finals Game 1 history.

Due to stellar defense by the Lakers, Dwight Howard was a dismal 1–6 from the field, his fewest made field goals in his playoff career, and finished with 12 points, 10 of which came from free throws. The Magic shot only 29.9% (23–77) from the field, the second lowest percentage in the NBA Finals.

=== Game 2 ===
ABC

June 7
8:00 p.m. (5:00 p.m. PDT)

Recap
Video highlights on YouTube

Orlando Magic 96, Los Angeles Lakers 101 (OT)
Scoring by quarter: 15–15, 20–25, 30–23, 23–25, Overtime: 8–13
Pts: Rashard Lewis 34; Rebs: Dwight Howard 16; Asts: Rashard Lewis 7	Pts: Kobe Bryant 29; Rebs: Pau Gasol 10; Asts: Kobe Bryant 8
L.A. Lakers lead series, 2–0

Staples Center, Los Angeles, California
Attendance: 18,997
Referees:
- No. 29 Steve Javie
- No. 13 Monty McCutchen
- No. 49 Tom Washington

Both teams got off to a slow start and were tied at 15 after the first quarter, setting a record-low for combined score (30) in the first quarter of an NBA Finals game. The Lakers picked up the pace in the 2nd quarter, but Rashard Lewis kept the Magic in the game, scoring 18 of the team's 20 points in the quarter, including the final 16, on his way to a playoff career-high and Finals franchise-high 34 points for the game. The Magic outscored the Lakers in the 3rd quarter to take a 2-point lead in the 4th.

With the game tied at 84, Rashard Lewis hit a jumper with 1:32 remaining to give the Magic a 2-point lead. Kobe Bryant responded with a jumper of his own to tie the game. With 47 seconds left, Hedo Türkoğlu hit a jumper that was originally called a three-pointer. However, replay showed that his foot was on the line, giving the Magic a two-point lead. With 33 seconds remaining, Dwight Howard was able to deflect, but not steal, a Derek Fisher pass, and Pau Gasol was able to again tie the game at 88 with a layup.

On the ensuing Magic possession, the Lakers played great defense and forced Courtney Lee to miss an awkward layup shot with 10.5 seconds left. With a chance to take a 2–0 series lead, Kobe Bryant was blocked on a jumper by Türkoğlu, who gained control of the ball and called time-out with 0.6 seconds left. After another timeout, Türkoğlu threw a half-court lob to Courtney Lee, who had come free after a screen on his defender. However, Lee was traveling too fast and launched his layup from almost behind the backboard, causing it to miss.

With the Lakers up 1 in overtime with 1:55 left, Derek Fisher stole a JJ Redick pass and was fouled on the ensuing fast break, making both free throws. After the Magic were unable to convert, Kobe Bryant made a pivotal assist to Pau Gasol for a layup-and-one, giving the Lakers a 6-point lead and the eventual victory.

Bryant delivered his famous “job's not finished” line during the postgame press conference.

=== Game 3 ===
ABC

June 9
9:00 p.m.

Recap
Video highlights on YouTube

Los Angeles Lakers 104, Orlando Magic 108
Scoring by quarter: 31–27, 23–32, 21–22, 29–27
Pts: Kobe Bryant 31; Rebs: Trevor Ariza 7 Asts: Kobe Bryant 8	Pts: Howard, Lewis 21 each Rebs: Dwight Howard 14; Asts: Hedo Türkoğlu 7
L.A. Lakers lead series, 2–1

Amway Arena, Orlando, Florida
Attendance: 17,461
Referees:
- No. 17 Joe Crawford
- No. 9 Derrick Stafford
- No. 18 Mark Wunderlich

The Magic came out in Game 3 with fire. The Magic shot a field goal percentage of 63% for the game, a Finals record. This also included a 75% first quarter, also a Finals record. However, despite the incredible shooting percentage, the Lakers managed to stay close for much of the game. The game was only sealed for the Magic on a Mickaël Piétrus steal from Kobe Bryant in the waning minute of the 4th quarter.

This win marked the first Finals win in Magic franchise history, losing their first 6 Finals games (being swept in their first appearance and losing Games 1 and 2)

=== Game 4 ===
ABC

June 11
9:00 p.m.

Recap
Video highlights on YouTube

Los Angeles Lakers 99, Orlando Magic 91 (OT)
Scoring by quarter: 20–24, 17–25, 30–14, 20–24, Overtime: 12–4
Pts: Kobe Bryant 32; Rebs: Pau Gasol 10; Asts: Kobe Bryant 8	Pts: Hedo Türkoğlu 25; Rebs: Dwight Howard 21; Asts: Rashard Lewis 4
L.A. Lakers lead series, 3–1

Amway Arena, Orlando, Florida
Attendance: 17,461
Referees:
- No. 24 Mike Callahan
- No. 48 Scott Foster
- No. 15 Bennett Salvatore

Coming off their franchise's first NBA Finals game victory, the Magic quickly took the lead in the first quarter. However, Kobe Bryant kept the Lakers in the game, scoring 13 of the team's 20 first-quarter points. Dwight Howard played a great first quarter, with 11 rebounds and 4 blocks in the opening frame. In addition, he drew many fouls, putting Andrew Bynum, Pau Gasol, and Lamar Odom in foul trouble and forcing Lakers coach Phil Jackson to use Josh Powell and D. J. Mbenga early in the game. The Magic were able to increase the lead to 12 at halftime.

The Lakers came out of the locker room aggressive and outscored the Magic 30–14 in the 3rd quarter, led by Trevor Ariza, who scored 13 points in the quarter, including two three-pointers. Down by six in the opening minutes of the 4th quarter, the Magic took a 76–75 lead halfway through the quarter, but were unable to increase the lead due to poor free-throw shooting, specifically from Hedo Türkoğlu and Dwight Howard.

With 3 minutes left in the 4th quarter and the game tied at 79, Howard converted a three-point play to give the Magic an 82–79 lead. On the next Laker possession, the Magic played good defense, but Trevor Ariza was able to hit a 3-pointer as the shot clock expired to tie the game at 82. After Hedo Türkoğlu hit a stepback 3-point shot, Howard blocked Gasol's jumper, giving him a single-game NBA Finals record with 9 blocked shots. On the bench to witness it was a previous record holder, his assistant coach Patrick Ewing, who had 8 in Game 5 of the 1994 NBA Finals while with the New York Knicks. Türkoğlu made another jumper with 1:34 remaining to give the Magic a five-point lead.

Down 87–82 with 31 seconds left, Kobe Bryant spun through the lane and passed to Gasol for a dunk to cut the lead to three. On the next Magic possession, Howard was fouled by Bryant with 11 seconds remaining. Needing just one free-throw to make the game a 2-possession affair, Howard missed both shots.

Out of the timeout, the Lakers elected to take the ball out at three-quarters court instead of half-court in order to space out the floor. The Magic double-teamed Bryant in the backcourt, allowing him to pass the ball up to Ariza, who in turned passed it to Derek Fisher on the right wing. Having missed his first five three-point shots of the game, Fisher spotted up and hit a pivotal three-pointer over Jameer Nelson to tie the game at 87 with 4.6 seconds left. On the final possession of regulation, Mickaël Piétrus missed a 20-footer.

The overtime session began with a three-pointer by Rashard Lewis and two contested jumpers by Kobe Bryant to give the Lakers a 91–90 lead. With 1:27 left in overtime, Howard split a pair of free throws to tie the game at 91. On the next possession, the Lakers would miss a layup and a jumper, but regained possession on an offensive rebound by Ariza and a loose-ball foul on Jameer Nelson. With 31 seconds left, Kobe Bryant passed out of a double-team with the controversy of no called after Jameer Nelson got hit by Kobe Elbow as Fisher hit a three-pointer to give the Lakers a 94–91 lead.

Out of a timeout, Türkoğlu rushed a three-point shot and missed. Rashard Lewis backtapped the rebound to center court, but the ball went to Pau Gasol, who ran in unimpeded for a dunk, giving the Lakers the lead for good. In the next possession, the Magic missed another shot, bouncing the ball to Fisher, who passed it to Ariza, then to Gasol for a dunk, but Pietrus slammed both arms on his back, resulting in Gasol getting a technical foul and Pietrus a flagrant-1 foul.

Upon the finish of the game, Oasis' "Don't Look Back in Anger" was played over the P.A. system at Amway Arena.

=== Game 5 ===
ABC

June 14
8:00 p.m.

Recap
Video highlights on YouTube

Los Angeles Lakers 99, Orlando Magic 86
Scoring by quarter: 26–28, 30–18, 20–15, 23–25
Pts: Kobe Bryant 30; Rebs: Pau Gasol 15; Asts: Kobe Bryant 5	Pts: Rashard Lewis 18; Rebs: Howard, Lewis 10 each Asts: Lewis, Nelson 4 each
L.A. Lakers win NBA Finals, 4–1

Amway Arena, Orlando, Florida
Attendance: 17,461
Referees:
- No. 43 Dan Crawford
- No. 14 Joe DeRosa
- No. 41 Ken Mauer

The Magic, facing the prospect of the Lakers winning a championship on their home floor, came out with a good start, leading by as much as 9 in the first quarter. In the opening frame, all 5 starters scored and assisted on at least one field goal, but the Lakers pulled within two at the quarter break. Down 40–36 with 7:11 in the 2nd quarter, the Lakers went on a 16–0 run, fueled by two 3-pointers and solid defensive play from Trevor Ariza. The Lakers led by as much as 12 in the 2nd quarter and the score was 56–46 at halftime.

Coming out of the half, Orlando cut the lead to 5 with 7:45 remaining in the 3rd on a three-pointer by Rafer Alston. Lamar Odom answered with back-to-back three-pointers to restore the Laker lead to double digits. Leading by as much as 18 in the half, Los Angeles led by 15 going into the 4th quarter. In the final quarter, Orlando attempted a run but managed to cut the lead down to only 12; at the buzzer, the Lakers celebrated their 15th title.

Following the game, NBA commissioner David Stern presented the Lakers with the Larry O'Brien Championship Trophy and presented Kobe Bryant with the Bill Russell NBA Finals MVP Trophy during a presentation on center court at Amway Arena. Bryant averaged 32.4 points, 5.6 rebounds, and 7.4 assists per game during the series.

== Statistics ==
January 25, 2010 White House Visit (8:49)
On January 25, 2010, Barack Obama hosted the 2008–09 Los Angeles Lakers at the White House following their victory in the 2009 NBA Finals to end the 2008–09 NBA season.

The series was the third straight championship the Lakers clinched on the road (after 2001 and 2002); the last time the Lakers clinched the championship at home was in 2000. With their team's win, Pau Gasol became the first Spaniard and D. J. Mbenga the first Belgian Congolese player to win an NBA championship. Bill and Luke Walton became the third father-son pair to each win a championship as a player; the other father-son combinations are Matt Guokas, Sr. (1947) with Matt Jr. (1967) and Rick Barry (1975) with son Brent (2005 and 2007). Kobe Bryant averaged 32.4 points and 7.4 assists in this series, which was the best combination of those categories since Jerry West averaged 37.9 points and 7.4 assists (1969).

For the Magic, Game 3 marked their first Finals game victory in franchise history after losing their first six Finals games, including being swept in their first Finals appearance in 1995. In Game 3, the Magic set the Finals record for the best field goal percentage with 63 percent, and the Finals record for best field goal percentage in the first half with 75 percent. As of 2023, this is the most recent Magic finals appearance.

This was the first NBA Finals series since 1984 to have two games go into overtime (Games 2 and 4); both were won by the Lakers. Dwight Howard set an NBA Finals single-game record with 9 blocked shots in Game 4. The previous record holders, all of whom had blocked eight shots in a Finals game, were: Bill Walton of the Portland Trail Blazers in Game 6 of the 1977 NBA Finals; Hakeem Olajuwon of the Houston Rockets in Game 5 of the 1986 NBA Finals; Howard's assistant coach Patrick Ewing of the New York Knicks in Game 5 of the 1994 NBA Finals; Shaquille O'Neal of the Los Angeles Lakers in Game 2 of the 2001 NBA Finals; and Tim Duncan of the San Antonio Spurs in Game 6 of the 2003 NBA Finals.

This was the seventh time in NBA Finals history that a team that lost the championship the previous season has won the Finals the very next year. It is the second time in Lakers history, after the 1984 and 1985 teams.

This was also the first odd season since 2001 that the San Antonio Spurs did not win the NBA Finals; they won in 2003, 2005, and 2007.

After this Finals series, the NBA ceased adding a decal version of the Larry O'Brien Championship Trophy at center court for all subsequent Finals afterward. However, starting with the 2026 NBA Finals, the trophy returned to center court, with the trophy now painted through in order to address player safety concerns. Uniform patches of the O'Brien Trophy were also used for the last time; starting with the 2010 NBA Finals, participating teams sported a modified NBA logo patch containing a gold ball and the NBA Finals wordmark.

This was also the last NBA Finals to be played at Amway Arena; the Magic moved to the Amway Center (now Kia Center) for the 2010–11 season.

Category	High		Average			
Category	High		Los Angeles Lakers		Orlando Magic	
Category	Player	Total	Player	Avg.	Player	Avg.
Points	(United States) Kobe Bryant	40	(United States) Kobe Bryant	32.4	(Turkey) Hedo Türkoğlu	18.0
Rebounds	(United States) Dwight Howard (United States) Dwight Howard	21 (OT); 15	(Spain) Pau Gasol	9.2	(United States) Dwight Howard	15.2
Assists	(United States) Kobe Bryant	8	(United States) Kobe Bryant	7.4	(United States) Rashard Lewis	4.0
Steals	(United States) Dwight Howard (France) Mickaël Piétrus	4 (OT); 3	(United States) Trevor Ariza	1.8	(United States) Dwight Howard	1.6
Blocks	(United States) Dwight Howard (Poland) Marcin Gortat (United States) Kobe Bryant (Spain) Pau Gasol	9 (OT); 4; 4; 4	(Spain) Pau Gasol	1.8	(United States) Dwight Howard	4.0

== 2009 NBA Finals rosters ==
=== Los Angeles Lakers ===
2008–09 Los Angeles Lakers roster
Players

Pos.	No.	Player	Height	Weight	DOB	From
F	3	Trevor Ariza	6 ft 8 in (2.03 m)	210 lb (95 kg)		UCLA
G	12	Shannon Brown	6 ft 4 in (1.93 m)	211 lb (96 kg)		Michigan State
G/F	24	Kobe Bryant	6 ft 6 in (1.98 m)	205 lb (93 kg)		Lower Merion HS (PA)
C	17	Andrew Bynum	7 ft 0 in (2.13 m)	285 lb (129 kg)		St. Joseph HS (NJ)
G	5	Jordan Farmar	6 ft 2 in (1.88 m)	180 lb (82 kg)		UCLA
G	2	Derek Fisher	6 ft 1 in (1.85 m)	205 lb (93 kg)		Little Rock
F/C	16	Pau Gasol	7 ft 0 in (2.13 m)	260 lb (118 kg)		Spain
C	28	Didier Ilunga-Mbenga	7 ft 0 in (2.13 m)	255 lb (116 kg)		Belgium
F	6	Adam Morrison	6 ft 8 in (2.03 m)	205 lb (93 kg)		Gonzaga
F	7	Lamar Odom	6 ft 10 in (2.08 m)	230 lb (104 kg)		Rhode Island
F/C	21	Josh Powell	6 ft 9 in (2.06 m)	225 lb (102 kg)		NC State
G	18	Sasha Vujačić	6 ft 7 in (2.01 m)	195 lb (88 kg)		Slovenia
F	4	Luke Walton	6 ft 8 in (2.03 m)	232 lb (105 kg)		Arizona
G	9	Sun Yue	6 ft 7 in (2.01 m)	205 lb (93 kg)		China

Coaches
Head coach
- (United States) Phil Jackson (North Dakota)
Assistant(s)
- (United States) Frank Hamblen (Syracuse)
- (United States) Kurt Rambis (Santa Clara)
- (United States) Brian Shaw (UC Santa Barbara)
- (United States) Kareem Abdul-Jabbar (UCLA)
- (United States) Craig Hodges (Long Beach State)
- (United States) Jim Cleamons (Ohio State)

Legend
- (DP) Unsigned draft pick
- (FA) Free agent
- (S) Suspended
- Injured

Roster
Updated: February 18, 2009

=== Orlando Magic ===
2008–09 Orlando Magic roster
Players

Pos.	No.	Player	Height	Weight	DOB	From
G	1	Rafer Alston	6 ft 2 in (1.88 m)	175 lb (79 kg)		Fresno State
F/C	4	Tony Battie	6 ft 11 in (2.11 m)	240 lb (109 kg)		Texas Tech
C	31	Adonal Foyle	6 ft 10 in (2.08 m)	270 lb (122 kg)		Colgate
C	13	Marcin Gortat	6 ft 11 in (2.11 m)	240 lb (109 kg)		Poland
C	12	Dwight Howard	6 ft 11 in (2.11 m)	265 lb (120 kg)		SW Atlanta Christian Academy (GA)
PG	8	Anthony Johnson	6 ft 3 in (1.91 m)	195 lb (88 kg)		College of Charleston
G	11	Courtney Lee	6 ft 5 in (1.96 m)	200 lb (91 kg)		Western Kentucky
F	9	Rashard Lewis	6 ft 10 in (2.08 m)	230 lb (104 kg)		Alief Elsik HS (TX)
G	10	Tyronn Lue	6 ft 0 in (1.83 m)	175 lb (79 kg)		Nebraska
G	14	Jameer Nelson	6 ft 0 in (1.83 m)	190 lb (86 kg)		Saint Joseph's
G/F	20	Mickaël Piétrus	6 ft 6 in (1.98 m)	215 lb (98 kg)		France
G	7	JJ Redick	6 ft 4 in (1.93 m)	190 lb (86 kg)		Duke
G/F	32	Jeremy Richardson	6 ft 7 in (2.01 m)	195 lb (88 kg)		Delta State
F	15	Hedo Türkoğlu	6 ft 10 in (2.08 m)	220 lb (100 kg)		Turkey

Coaches
Head coach
- (United States) Stan Van Gundy (SUNY–Brockport)
Assistant(s)
- (United States) Brendan Malone (Iona)
- (United States) Steve Clifford (Maine)
- (United States) Patrick Ewing (Georgetown)
- (United States) Bob Beyer (Alfred)

Legend
- (DP) Unsigned draft pick
- (FA) Free agent
- (S) Suspended
- Injured

Roster
Updated: March 23, 2009

== Player statistics ==
Legend
GP	Games played	GS	Games started	MPG	Minutes per game
FG%	Field-goal percentage	3P%	3-point field-goal percentage	FT%	Free-throw percentage
RPG	Rebounds per game	APG	Assists per game	SPG	Steals per game
BPG	Blocks per game	PPG	Points per game

Los Angeles Lakers

Los Angeles Lakers statistics
Player	GP	GS	MPG	FG%	3P%	FT%	RPG	APG	SPG	BPG	PPG
Trevor Ariza	5	5	37.6	.357	.417	.500	6.0	1.6	1.8	0.2	11.0
Shannon Brown	3	0	5.2	.000	.000	.000	0.3	0.0	0.0	0.0	0.0
Kobe Bryant	5	5	43.8	.430	.360	.841	5.6	7.4	1.4	1.4	32.4
Andrew Bynum	5	5	18.9	.364	.000	.667	4.2	0.6	0.4	0.6	6.0
Jordan Farmar	5	0	11.5	.368	.125	1.000	1.2	0.4	0.4	0.0	3.4
Derek Fisher	5	5	35.9	.500	.438	1.000	3.0	1.8	1.2	0.0	11.0
Pau Gasol	5	5	42.5	.600	.000	.778	9.2	2.2	0.8	1.8	18.6
D. J. Mbenga	3	0	2.0	.000	.000	.000	0.3	0.0	0.0	0.3	0.0
Lamar Odom	5	0	33.8	.542	.500	.688	7.8	0.8	1.0	1.0	13.4
Josh Powell	2	0	5.5	.500	1.000	.000	2.0	0.5	0.0	0.0	2.5
Sasha Vujačić	5	0	4.4	.000	.000	.000	0.4	0.4	0.0	0.0	0.0
Luke Walton	5	0	15.2	.800	.000	.500	2.0	1.0	0.2	0.0	3.8

Orlando Magic

Orlando Magic statistics
Player	GP	GS	MPG	FG%	3P%	FT%	RPG	APG	SPG	BPG	PPG
Rafer Alston	5	5	29.5	.368	.158	.800	2.2	3.0	0.8	0.0	10.6
Tony Battie	5	0	7.0	.455	.000	.000	0.8	0.4	0.0	0.4	2.0
Marcin Gortat	5	0	10.7	.467	.000	.500	2.6	0.0	0.4	1.0	3.2
Dwight Howard	5	5	42.6	.488	.000	.603	15.2	2.2	1.6	4.0	15.4
Courtney Lee	5	5	17.6	.375	.182	.750	1.4	0.2	0.6	0.0	5.8
Rashard Lewis	5	5	42.5	.405	.400	.846	7.6	4.0	0.8	0.0	17.4
Jameer Nelson	5	0	18.0	.348	.167	.500	1.4	2.8	0.2	0.0	3.8
Mickaël Piétrus	5	0	28.0	.475	.333	.786	2.0	0.4	0.6	0.2	10.6
JJ Redick	4	0	16.3	.400	.455	1.000	0.5	2.0	0.3	0.0	5.5
Hedo Türkoğlu	5	5	41.1	.492	.438	.742	4.6	3.8	0.8	0.4	18.0

== International broadcasts ==
Aside from ABC (U.S.) and TSN (Canada), other broadcasters across the world covered the Finals:

- Argentina: Canal 7
- Australia: ESPN and ONE HD
- Belgium: Be 1 and Prime Sport 1
- Belize: Great Belize Television and Tropical Vision Limited (all games except games 2 and 5 joined in progress; Sunday games covered in full)
- Bosnia and Herzegovina: OBN
- Brazil: ESPN Latin America
- Chile: ESPN Latin America
- China: CCTV-5, several provincial broadcasters
- Cyprus: Lumiere TV
- Denmark: DK4 Sport
- Dominican Republic: Antena Latina
- El Salvador: SKY México
- Finland: Urheilukanava
- France: Canal+, Orange Sport
- Greece: Sport+
- Hong Kong: ESPN, Cable TV Hong Kong Sports Channel, Star Sports, TVB HD
- Hungary: Sport1, Sport2
- Iceland: Stöð 2 Sport
- India: ESPN
- Indonesia: ESPN, JakTV
- Italy: Sky sport
- Israel: Sport 5
- Japan: J Sports Plus, NHK BS-1, SkyPerfecTV
- South Korea: SBS Sports, Star Sports
- Latvia: LTV7
- Mexico: ESPN Dos
- (Arab League) North Africa: aljazeera sport +3
- Netherlands: Sport1
- Oman: NBA TV
- Peru: ESPN Latin America, CMD
- Philippines: C/S 9, Basketball TV
- Poland: Canal+Sport1
- Portugal: Sport TV 1
- Russia: NBA TV
- Spain: Canal +, Cuatro
- Sweden: TV4 AB
- Taiwan: Videoland
- Thailand: ESPN
- Trinidad and Tobago: ESPN
- Turkey: NTV
- United Kingdom: Five / Setanta Sports 2
- Venezuela: Sport Plus

Locally, the Finals were broadcast on Los Angeles' KABC-TV and Orlando's WFTV.

== Impact and aftermath ==
=== Lakers ===
Bryant at the Lakers' parade after winning the NBA finals, June 16, 2009

The series win brought the Lakers' franchise championship total to 15, trailing only the Boston Celtics. The championship was the fourth title for the Lakers during the 2000s, the most among all teams in the four major professional sports leagues in North America.

By virtue of their win this year and loss in the previous year, this marked the tenth occurrence that the winners of the NBA Finals were losers in the preceding year's Finals, previously the Detroit Pistons had lost and won the Finals in 1988 and 1989 respectively. The victory was noted by many as a personal success for Finals MVP Kobe Bryant, winning his first championship and succeeding in the playoffs without the presence of former Lakers center Shaquille O'Neal where some people had previously speculated that Bryant could not "win one without Shaq". Head coach, Phil Jackson, captured his 10th NBA championship, setting a new record by surpassing Red Auerbach for the highest number of championships ever won by an NBA coach. Jackson also surpassed Auerbach and NHL coach Scotty Bowman to become the head coach with the most sporting championships in the history of all four major professional sports leagues in North America. Having achieved three Game 1 victories throughout the postseason (first round vs. Utah, conference finals vs. Denver, and NBA Finals vs. Orlando), Phil Jackson-coached NBA teams were now 44–0 in series where they win the first game, later improved to 48–0 by the time Jackson retired after the 2011 NBA playoffs.

The Lakers made their sole offseason roster adjustment by acquiring Ron Artest from the Houston Rockets in a significant trade that resulted in Trevor Ariza departing to join the Houston Rockets. During the subsequent season, the Lakers secured the top position in the Western Conference, despite recording eight fewer victories than the previous year. They eliminated the Oklahoma City Thunder in six, the Utah Jazz in four, and the Phoenix Suns in six games to return to the 2010 NBA Finals and renew their heated rivalry with the Celtics. In the 2010 NBA Finals, the Lakers won a hard-fought seven-game series against the Celtics to successfully defend and retain their NBA title, becoming the first NBA team to repeat as champions since the 2001-02 Lakers.

=== Magic ===
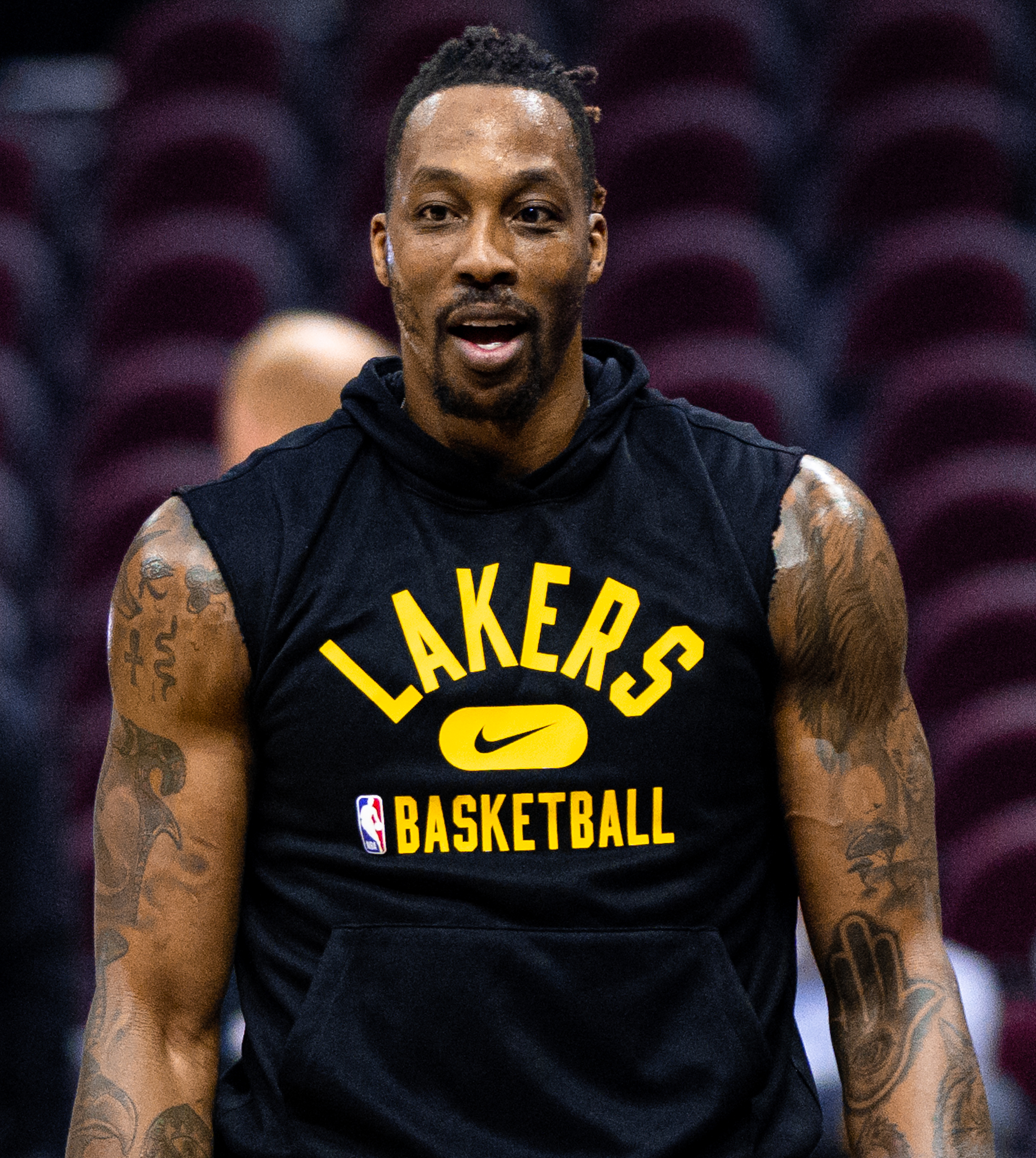
Dwight Howard had two stints with the Lakers in his post-Magic career.

The Magic again won 59 games and the division title during the 2009–10 season, in which they relinquished Hedo Türkoğlu to the Toronto Raptors and acquired 8-time All-Star and NBA veteran Vince Carter from the New Jersey Nets. Standout player, Dwight Howard won Defensive Player of the Year for the second straight year. In the playoffs the Magic swept the Charlotte Bobcats and the Atlanta Hawks, becoming the first team in NBA history to win their first eight playoff games by 20 or more points. However, the Magic would lose to the Boston Celtics in six games of the Eastern Conference finals, marking the final games that were held at Amway Arena. The Magic moved to the Amway Center during the 2010–11 season, and then proceeded to lose in the first round for two straight years to the Hawks and the Indiana Pacers, respectively. After the 2011–12 season, Stan Van Gundy was fired, and in a blockbuster offseason trade, Howard was traded to the Lakers, which he spent one season with them and later moved onto the Houston Rockets in 2013. However, the team failed to reach NBA Finals due to the rise of the upstart Golden State Warriors. Thus, Howard returned to the Eastern Conference teams after signing with Atlanta Hawks in 2016. Howard returned to the Lakers in 2019 where he had his moment of glory, winning a championship in 2020.

To date, this is the most recent NBA Finals appearance for the Magic.
