= Semih Erden =

Turkish basketball player (born 1986)

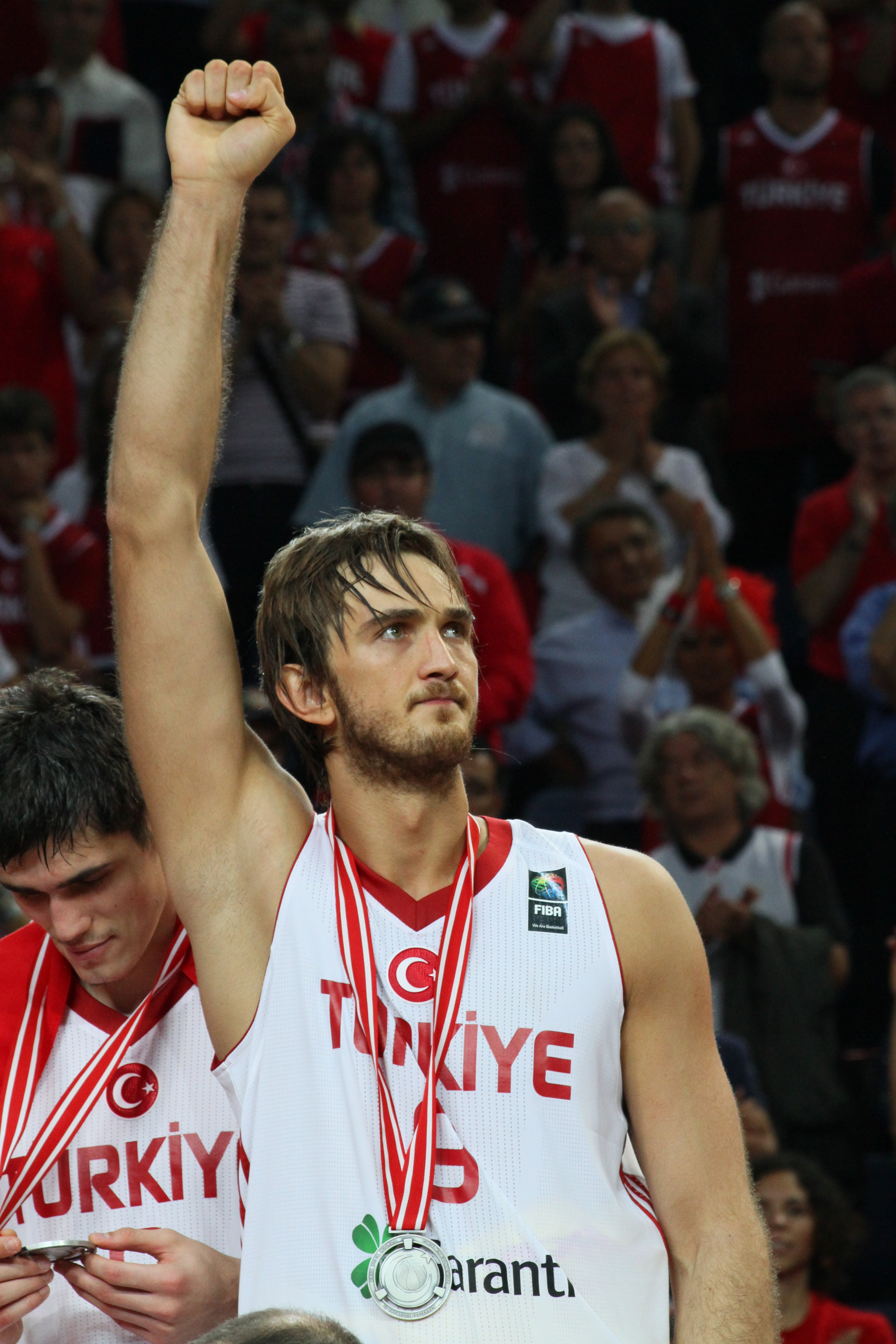
- Semih Erden at the awarding ceremony of the 2010 FIBA World Championship

Personal information
- Born: July 28, 1986 (age 40) Gaziosmanpaşa, Istanbul, Turkey
- Listed height: 6 ft 11 in (2.11 m)
- Listed weight: 255 lb (116 kg)

Career information
- NBA draft: 2008: 2nd round, 60th overall pick
- Drafted by: Boston Celtics
- Playing career: 2003–2024
- Position: Center
- Number: 9, 86, 13

Career history
- 2003–2004: Darüşşafaka
- 2004–2005: Partizan
- 2005–2010: Fenerbahçe
- 2010–2011: Boston Celtics
- 2011–2012: Cleveland Cavaliers
- 2011: Beşiktaş
- 2012–2014: Anadolu Efes
- 2014–2015: Fenerbahçe
- 2015–2017: Darüşşafaka
- 2017: Hacettepe Üniversitesi
- 2017–2018: Beşiktaş
- 2018–2019: İstanbul BŞB
- 2019–2022: Pınar Karşıyaka
- 2022–2023: Türk Telekom
- 2023–2024: Bursaspor

Career highlights
- 3× Turkish League champion (2007, 2008, 2010); Turkish Cup winner (2010); Turkish President's Cup winner (2008); 7× Turkish League All-Star (2006, 2007, 2010, 2013, 2015–2017); Serbian and Montenegro League champion (2005)
- Stats at NBA.com
- Stats at Basketball Reference
Medals
Men's basketball
Representing Turkey
FIBA World Cup
Silver medal – second place	2010 Turkey
European U-18 Championship
Silver medal – second place	2004 Spain	Under-18

Semih Erden (born July 28, 1986) is a Turkish former professional basketball player. Standing at 6 ft 11 in (2.11 m), he played at the center position.

== Professional career ==
=== Early years ===
Erden played with Darüşşafaka in the Turkish Basketball League in 2003–04 season, appeared in one game in which he recorded one point and two rebounds. He spent the majority of the season playing with the Darüşşafaka junior team.

Next season, Erden played with Partizan Belgrade in the Adriatic League and averaged 4.6 points and 3.2 rebounds. He scored in double figures twice, tallying a high of 17 points against KK Hemofarm. He contributed 3.0 points and 2.3 rebounds per game in 12.5 minutes a contest in the EuroLeague. His highest scoring game of 10 points occurred against Efes Pilsen. In 2004–05, he also appeared in seven Yugoslav Basketball League games, averaging 1.7 points and 0.7 rebounds in 4.4 minutes a contest.

=== Fenerbahçe ===
In 2005, he signed with Fenerbahçe of the Turkish Basketball League. Erden averaged 6.5 points and 5.4 rebounds in 18.4 minutes a contest. He had a high of 14 points at Fenerbahçe and scored in double figures seven times. He also contributed 3.4 points and 2.2 rebounds in 9.1 minutes a contest in nine Euroleague games.

In his second season with Fenerbahçe, Erden played 16.1 minutes a game, averaged 6.4 points and 3.8 rebounds in Turkish League play, registering a high of 10 points against Galatasaray Café Crown. In the Euroleague, Semih added 4.5 points and 3.1 rebounds in 13.8 minutes per match.

In third season Erden averaged 7.1 points and 4.7 rebounds in 19.5 minutes a game in Turkish League play, scoring in double figures six times with a high of 15 points against CASA TED Kolejliler. During the season though, he missed a number of games due to a knee injury. In the Euroleague, he added 6.7 points and 4.3 rebounds in 19.3 minutes a contest, scored in double figures three times and posting high of 15 points against Panathinaikos Athens.

=== NBA ===
Erden was selected by the Boston Celtics with the 60th pick in the 2008 NBA draft. Erden was still under a one-year contract with Fenerbahçe and did not join the roster in 2008–09. He was seen by Celtics general manager Danny Ainge as their first-round pick in 2009.

On July 5, 2010, Celtics signed Erden to a one-year minimum contract with a team option for 2011–12.

With Boston centers Shaquille O'Neal, Kendrick Perkins and Jermaine O'Neal out with injuries, Erden earned his first career start on December 9, 2010, against the Philadelphia 76ers. He scored 8 points in 18 minutes in a 102–101 victory. Two nights later, Erden started for the second time in a 93–62 victory over the Charlotte Bobcats. In that game Erden played a game-high 41 minutes recording 10 points, 7 rebounds, 4 blocked shots and a plus/minus rating of +34.

On February 24, 2011, Erden was traded to the Cleveland Cavaliers along with teammate Luke Harangody in exchange for a second-round draft pick.

On June 30, 2012, the Cavaliers extended a qualifying offer to Erden, thus making him a restricted free agent.

=== Return to Europe ===
On September 21, 2011, Erden signed with the Turkish club Beşiktaş until the end of the 2011 NBA lockout. He played alongside New Jersey Nets All-Star Deron Williams.

On November 22, 2011, Erden suffered a broken finger in a Eurochallenge game.

On July 3, 2012, he signed a two-year contract with Anadolu Efes. On May 26, 2014, he parted ways with Efes.

On August 1, 2014, he returned to Fenerbahçe signing a one-year deal. In 2014–15 season, Fenerbahçe advanced to the Euroleague Final Four for the first time in team's history. On May 15, 2015, however, they lost in the semifinal game to Real Madrid with 87–96.

In August 2015, Erden signed a one-year deal with his former club Darüşşafaka. On August 26, 2016, he re-signed with Darüşşafaka. On February 6, 2017, he was waived by Darüşşafaka.

On October 6, 2017, Erden signed a temporary contract with ABEL team Hacettepe Üniversitesi GSK in order to keep him able to sign a loan deal in BSL. On October 26, 2017, he signed a 1+1 deal with Beşiktaş.

On October 2, 2018, Erden signed a one-year contract with BSL side İstanbul BŞB.

On August 20, 2019, Erden signed with 2-year deal with Pınar Karşıyaka of the Turkish Basketball Super League. Erden averaged over 8 points and 4 rebounds in EuroCup in the 2019–20 season. On August 12, 2020, he extended his contract until 2022.

On July 10, 2022, Erden signed with Türk Telekom of the Basketbol Süper Ligi (BSL).

On September 23, 2023, Erden signed with Bursaspor İnfo Yatırım of the Basketbol Süper Ligi (BSL).

On February 4, 2025, Erden announced his retirement via his Instagram page.

== Career statistics ==
Legend
GP	Games played	GS	Games started	MPG	Minutes per game
FG%	Field goal percentage	3P%	3-point field goal percentage	FT%	Free throw percentage
RPG	Rebounds per game	APG	Assists per game	SPG	Steals per game
BPG	Blocks per game	PPG	Points per game	**Bold**	Career high

=== NBA ===
==== Regular season ====
Year	Team	GP	GS	MPG	FG%	3P%	FT%	RPG	APG	SPG	BPG	PPG
2010–11	Boston	**37**	7	14.4	**.598**	.000	.630	**2.9**	**.5**	**.4**	.6	**4.1**
2010–11	Cleveland	4	1	**16.0**	.286	.000	**.833**	2.8	.3	.5	**.8**	3.3
2011–12	Cleveland	28	**9**	11.9	.527	.000	.512	2.6	.3	.4	.2	3.5
Career		69	17	13.4	.546	.000	.594	2.8	.4	.4	.4	3.8

== National team career ==
Erden is a regular player on the Turkish national team. His first international experience came in the 2005 U20 European Championships held in Moscow. He averaged 10.4 points and 8.0 rebounds in seven games for Turkey. In the 2006 U20 European Championships, held in İzmir, Turkey, Erden helped lead Turkey to a silver medal, averaging 5.4 points and 3.4 rebounds in eight games. In the same year, he earned a spot on the Turkish team for the 2006 World Championship in Japan. He contributed 2.2 points and 2.3 rebounds a game. In the 2007 European Championship in Spain, Erden averaged 1.0 points and 1.0 rebounds in his five games.

== Personal life ==
Some of Erden's ancestors are of Bosniak origin.

== See also ==
- List of European basketball players in the United States
