= Jordan Farmar =

American basketball player (born 1986)

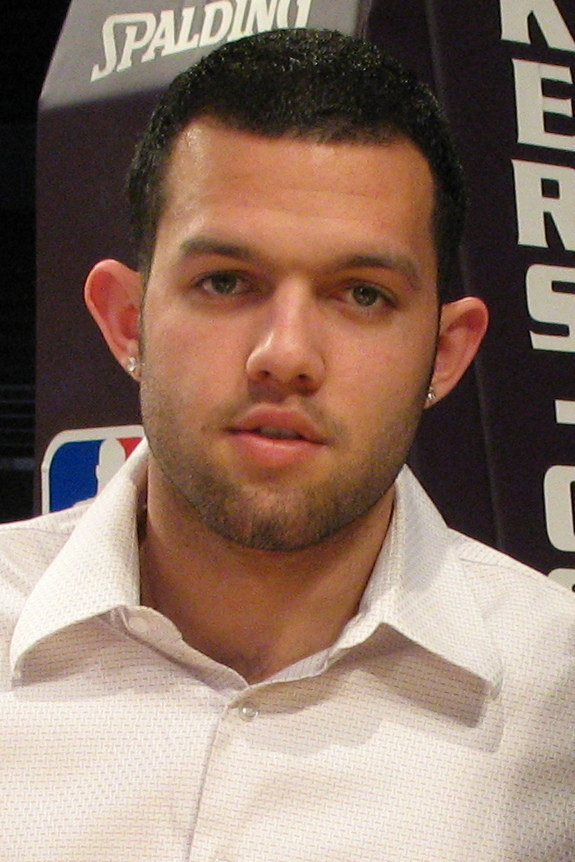
- Farmar at an event in Los Angeles

Personal information
- Born: November 30, 1986 (age 39) Los Angeles, California, U.S.
- Listed height: 6 ft 2 in (1.88 m)
- Listed weight: 180 lb (82 kg)

Career information
- High school: Taft (Woodland Hills, California)
- College: UCLA (2004–2006)
- NBA draft: 2006: 1st round, 26th overall pick
- Drafted by: Los Angeles Lakers
- Playing career: 2006–2016
- Position: Point guard
- Number: 5, 1, 2, 4, 20, 9

Career history
- 2006–2010: Los Angeles Lakers
- 2007: →Los Angeles D-Fenders
- 2010–2012: New Jersey Nets
- 2011: Maccabi Tel Aviv
- 2012–2013: Anadolu Efes
- 2013–2014: Los Angeles Lakers
- 2014–2015: Los Angeles Clippers
- 2015: Darüşşafaka
- 2015–2016: Maccabi Tel Aviv
- 2016: Memphis Grizzlies
- 2016: Sacramento Kings

Career highlights
- 2× NBA champion (2009, 2010); 2× Israeli League Cup winner (2011, 2015); AP Honorable mention All-American (2006); First-team All-Pac-10 (2006); Pac-10 Freshman of the Year (2005); Pac-10 All-Freshman Team (2005); McDonald's All-American (2004); Second-team Parade All-American (2004)

Career NBA statistics
- Points: 3,888 (7.7 ppg)
- Rebounds: 958 (1.9 rpg)
- Assists: 1,453 (2.9 apg)
- Stats at NBA.com
- Stats at Basketball Reference

Jordan Robert Farmar (born November 30, 1986) is an American-Israeli former professional basketball player who played in the National Basketball Association (NBA). In high school, he was named the Los Angeles Times High School Player of the Year in 2003–04. Playing college basketball for the UCLA Bruins, he was the Rivals.com National Freshman of the Year in 2004–05. Farmar was selected 26th overall in the first round of the 2006 NBA draft by the Los Angeles Lakers. With the Lakers, he won two NBA championships in 2009 and 2010.

== Early life ==
Farmar was born in Los Angeles. His mother is named Melinda, known as "Mindy", and his father is Damon Farmar, a former minor league baseball outfielder who was a second round pick in both the 1981 January draft and the 1982 June draft secondary phase. His father is African-American. His maternal grandfather, Dr. Howard Baker, attended UCLA and worked at the UCLA Medical Center as a neurologist. Farmar has a half-sister, Shoshana Kolani.

Farmar's parents divorced when he was two years old, and he went to live with his mother. She soon met and married her current husband (Farmar's stepfather), Israeli Yehuda Kolani from Tel Aviv.

Farmar is Jewish, as are his mother and stepfather. He attended Hebrew school and had his bar mitzvah at Temple Judea in Tarzana, California.

Farmar started playing basketball at age 4. He credits his stepfather Yehuda Kolani with instilling discipline, mental strength, persistence, and a sense of obligation. Farmar inherited his competitive drive from his father and mentor, Damon Farmar, who played football and baseball at University High and baseball in the minor leagues. The younger Farmar spent hours in his father's clubhouses, with his father's teammates, and watching his father play. Farmar's godfather is former major league baseball player Eric Davis.

== High school career ==
Farmar attended Portola Middle School and Temple Judea in Tarzana and Birmingham High School in Van Nuys, before transferring his second year to Taft High School in Woodland Hills, a suburban community of the San Fernando Valley within Los Angeles.

At Taft High School, Farmar scored a record 54 points in a single game. As a junior, he averaged 28.5 points per game, 8.0 rebounds, 5.9 assists, and 4.5 steals. As a senior, he averaged 27.5 points and 6.5 assists, and led Taft to the school's first Los Angeles City title. He had over 2,000 points in two seasons at Taft. Farmar was named the Los Angeles Times Player of the Year, LA City Co-Player of the Year, and California Interscholastic Federation Los Angeles City Section High School Player of the Year. He earned USA Today Super 25 selection, second-team Parade All-American, Slam Magazine Honorable Mention All-American, CalHi Sports All-State honors, and the Southern California Jewish Athlete of the Year. He was a teammate with former New York Giants wide receiver Steve Smith. Additionally, he was selected to play in the McDonald's High School All American game, where he scored 6 points and had 3 assists and 7 steals in 19 minutes of playing time.

== College career ==
Considered one of the elite point guards in the nation at UCLA, Farmar was named to the All-Pac-10 First Team and the all Pac-10 Tournament team. As a freshman in 2004–05, Farmar was the Rivals.com National Freshman of the Year, and Pac-10 Freshman of the Year. He led the team in assists (5.28 average) and free throw percentage (.801), and was # 2 in minutes (34.3) and points (13.2 points; # 1 among freshman guards), while topping all Pac-10 freshmen in scoring, assists, free throw percentage, and minutes played, as he was second in steals.

He was named All-Pac-10 First Team the next season. In the 2006 NCAA Tournament, Farmar led the UCLA Bruins to the National Championship game against the Florida Gators, which they lost by a score of 73–57. Farmar led all scorers with 18 points, and finished with 2 rebounds, 4 assists, and 2 steals. Farmar made a notable steal and assist at the end of UCLA's Sweet Sixteen matchup with the Gonzaga Bulldogs, giving his team the lead for good after an impressive comeback effort. On April 20, 2006, he declared for the NBA draft.

== Professional career ==
=== Los Angeles Lakers (2006–2010) ===
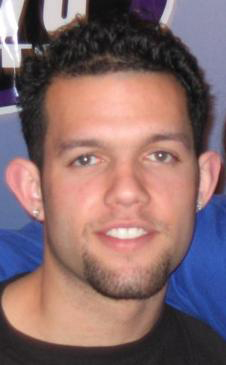
Farmar in 2008

Farmar impressed NBA scouts at the pre-draft combine with a 42-inch (110 cm) vertical leap, the highest of any player there. Later, he was drafted by the Los Angeles Lakers with the 26th pick in the NBA draft, which was acquired along with Brian Grant, Caron Butler and Lamar Odom in a trade that sent Shaquille O'Neal to the Miami Heat. On July 8, 2006, he made his debut at the Summer Pro League, which was held at the Walter Pyramid. His final game totals were 17 points and 3 assists in 31 minutes of play.

For most of the 2006–07 NBA season, Farmar played backup to Smush Parker. On March 31, 2007, Farmar was assigned to the Lakers' D-League team, the Los Angeles D-Fenders. On April 1, Farmar scored 18 points in a 109–101 home loss against the Anaheim Arsenal. Later on that afternoon, he was re-called by the Lakers to play against the visiting Sacramento Kings. Farmar added 4 points and 4 rebounds in 7:38 minutes playing time, helping the Lakers take a home victory, thereby making history by becoming the first player ever to participate in both a D-League and an NBA game on the same day. On April 15, against the Seattle SuperSonics, Farmar got his first professional career start, replacing Parker in the starting lineup. Along with two starts in the regular season, Farmar started all five playoff games at point guard. In those games against first round opponent the Phoenix Suns, he averaged 6.4 ppg and 1.2 spg against Steve Nash.

With the departure of Smush Parker, Aaron McKie, and Shammond Williams, the Lakers lacked a point guard. Therefore, with the 19th selection in the 2007 NBA draft the Los Angeles Lakers selected point guard Javaris Crittenton, who was later traded to the Memphis Grizzlies. As a result, during the summer and fall of 2007 Farmar became a denizen of the team training facility, working on his shot from June through September. He knew his job was in jeopardy with a new point guard in town, and knew he had to work to keep his position within the organization. His hard work paid off, and he averaged 9.1 points, 2.2 rebounds, and 2.7 assists per game, in 20.6 minutes per game, as the backup to veteran point guard Derek Fisher, who made his return to the Lakers. He played in all 82 games in the 2007–08 season, and shot 46.1% from the field, 3.9% up from the prior season, as well as 37.1% from three-point range, 4.3% up from the prior season. "I'm just trying to shorten [my shot], square my shoulders up and just knock it down", Farmar said. "It's all hand–eye coordination, and I believe in my ability." He had a career high of 24 points in a game against the Miami Heat.

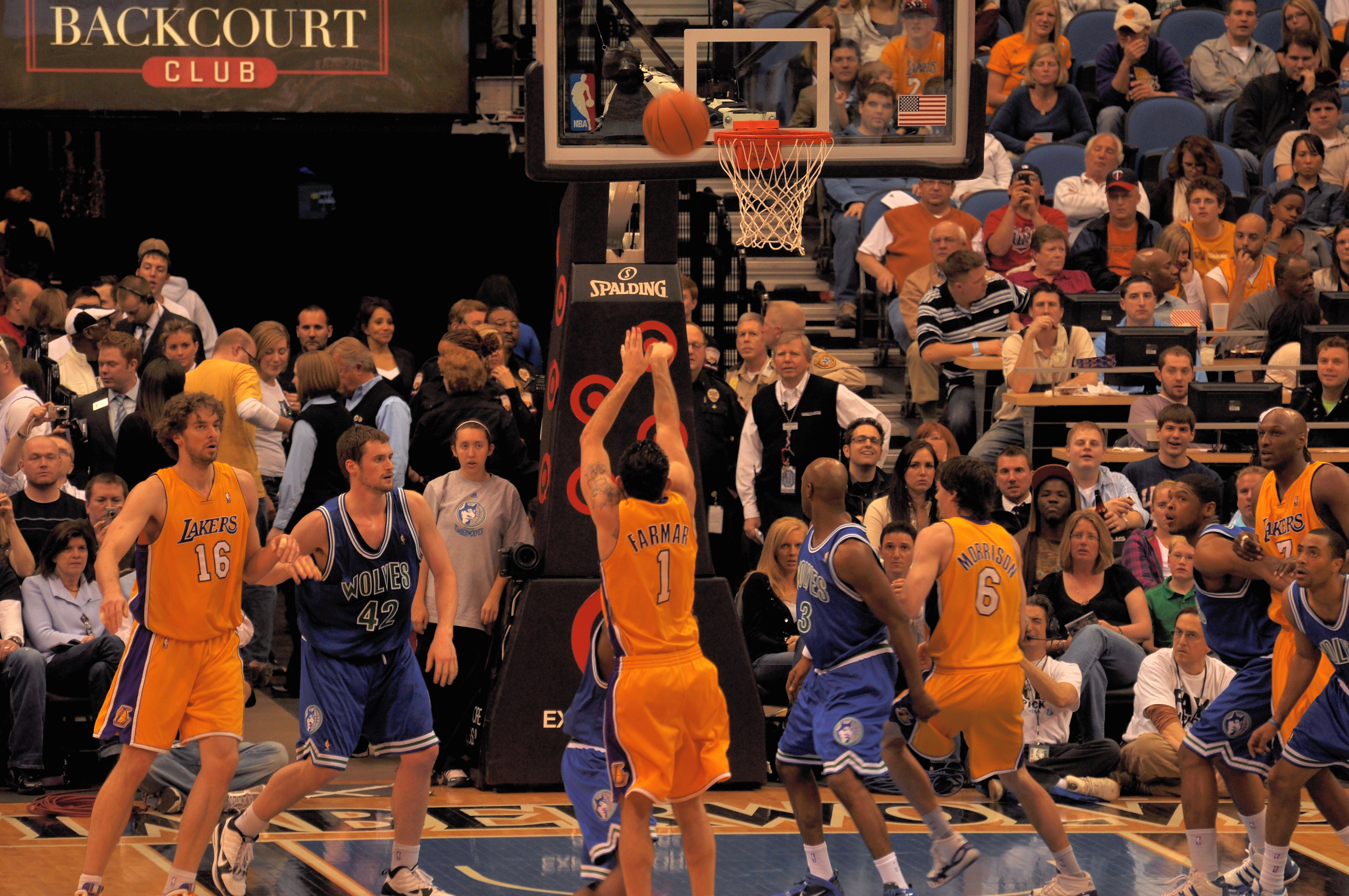
Farmar shooting against the Minnesota Timberwolves in 2010

On December 24, 2008, Farmar underwent surgery to repair a torn lateral meniscus in his left knee after suffering an injury in a game against the Miami Heat. He was expected to miss 8 weeks. Farmar was averaging 7.9 points and 2.4 assists before his injury. On January 25, 2009, Farmar returned to action nearly a month earlier than expected, recording 14 points and 2 assists against San Antonio.

On April 13, 2010, Farmar suffered a slight strain of his left hamstring, on the second-to-last game of the season. However, head coach Phil Jackson said Farmar would dress up for the season finale, to ensure that he would record a full 82-game season. He would recover in time for the playoffs, where he would help the team win a second consecutive championship.

=== New Jersey Nets (2010–2011) ===
After winning two championship rings with his hometown Los Angeles Lakers, Farmar agreed to a three-year, $12 million contract with the New Jersey Nets on July 14, 2010. A large factor in his decision was his feeling stifled playing behind the established Fisher with the Lakers. In 2010–11, he averaged 9.6 points per game on .467 field goal percentage.

=== Maccabi Tel Aviv (2011) ===
On August 3, 2011, Farmar signed a one-year contract with the Israeli Basketball Super League champion Maccabi Tel Aviv, in the wake of the 2011 NBA lockout. Farmar was very excited to go to Tel Aviv, because his step-father is from the city, and he spent time there as a child.

Because Farmar is Jewish, he is eligible to apply for Israeli citizenship, and he has expressed an interest in doing so. That way he would be considered an Israeli player, and thereby avoid being counted against the Israeli league's limit of four non-Israeli players per team. He would also be eligible to play for the Israel national basketball team in the Olympics and other international competitions.

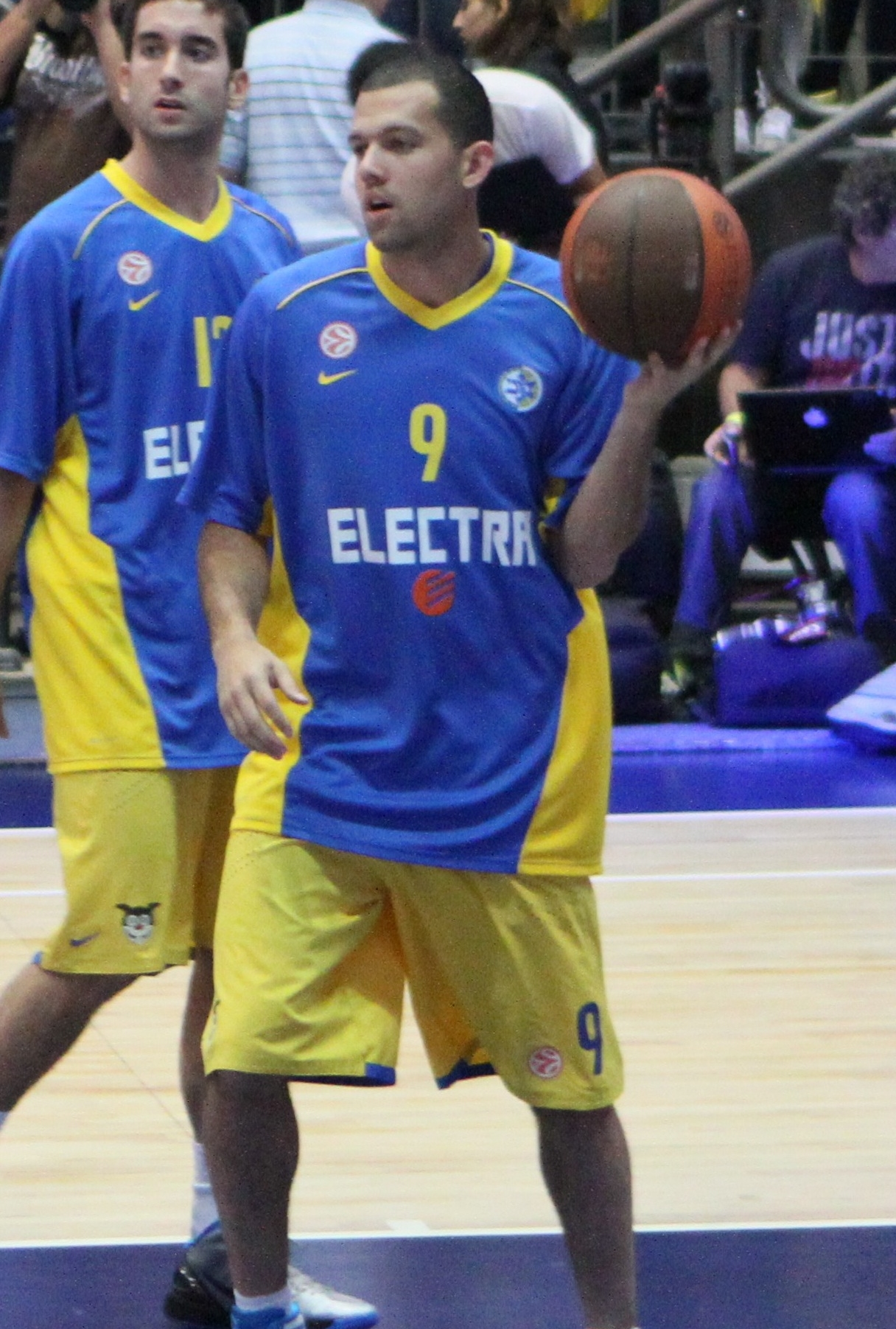
Farmar with Maccabi Tel Aviv in 2011

Farmar began playing for the team when its season began on October 1, 2011. His teammates included former All-American Duke guard Jon Scheyer, who joined the team in June. In the first week of November 2011, he won EuroLeague Player of the Week honors after a 27-point game against Real Madrid. His final game with the team was a 74–71 loss to Partizan Belgrade. He averaged 14.1 points in seven EuroLeague games.

=== Return to the Nets (2011–2012) ===
Farmar returned to the New Jersey Nets after the NBA lockout ended.

On March 7, 2012, Farmar hit an open game-winning 3-point shot against the Los Angeles Clippers, leaving the clock with 0.2 seconds left. The final score was 101–100. In 2011–12, he averaged 10.4 points per game and 5.0 assists per game, as he played 24.6 minutes per game.

On July 11, 2012, Farmar, Anthony Morrow, Jordan Williams, Johan Petro, DeShawn Stevenson, and a 2013 first round draft pick were traded to the Atlanta Hawks for Joe Johnson. Five days later, he was waived by the Hawks.

=== Anadolu Efes (2012–2013) ===
On July 12, 2012, Farmar signed a three-year $15 million contract, with opt-outs after each season, with the Turkish League team Anadolu Efes. He averaged 13.8 points in 29 EuroLeague games.

=== Return to the Lakers (2013–2014) ===
On July 17, 2013, Farmar returned to the Lakers, signing for the 2013–14 season. On December 1, Farmar tore his left hamstring and was expected to miss a month of action. He only played 56 seconds before leaving the game. On February 28, 2014, he scored a career-high 30 points in a 126–122 win over Sacramento. He was a career-high 8-for-10 on 3-pointers in the game, and the Lakers set a franchise record for most threes made in a regulation game, shooting 19-for-27. In 2013–14, he averaged 10.1 points per game, 4.9 assists per game, and 2.5 rebounds per game.

=== Los Angeles Clippers (2014–2015) ===
On July 9, 2014, Farmar signed with the Los Angeles Clippers. The team signed him to replace former UCLA teammate Darren Collison, who left the Clippers as a free agent. Farmar never quite fit in with the team, and was waived on January 16, 2015, after agreeing to a buyout. He had complained of an inconsistent role and playing time on the team, while coaches were unhappy with his performance. In 36 games, he averaged 4.6 points, 1.9 assists and 1.2 rebounds.

=== Darüşşafaka (2015) ===
On February 7, 2015, Farmar signed with Darüşşafaka of Turkey for the rest of the 2014–15 Turkish Basketball League season. He averaged 14.9 points in 14 Turkish national league games.

=== Return to Maccabi Tel Aviv (2015–2016) ===
On July 6, 2015, he returned to Maccabi Tel Aviv, signing a contract for the 2015–16 season. On January 10, 2016, he parted ways with Maccabi. He averaged 8.9 points, 2.4 rebounds, and 2.8 assists in eight EuroLeague games.

=== Memphis Grizzlies (2016) ===
On March 21, 2016, Farmar signed a 10-day contract with the Memphis Grizzlies. That night, he made his debut for the Grizzlies in a 103–97 win over the Phoenix Suns, recording 12 points, three rebounds, one assist, and one steal in 23 minutes. On March 31, he signed with the Grizzlies for the rest of the season. Then, on the same day, Farmar scored a season-high 14 points and dished out 5 assists in a losing effort against the Denver Nuggets. On April 5, Farmar, scored a new season-high with 15 points in a 108–92 victory over the visiting Chicago Bulls. He also grabbed 2 rebounds and dished out 4 assists.

=== Sacramento Kings (2016) ===
On September 14, 2016, Farmar signed with the Sacramento Kings. He was waived by the Kings on October 24, and later re-signed on November 2. On November 7, he was waived by the Kings after appearing in two games.

== Accolades ==
In 2010 he was inducted into the Southern California Jewish Sports Hall of Fame.

== Career statistics ==
Legend
GP	Games played	GS	Games started	MPG	Minutes per game
FG%	Field-goal percentage	3P%	3-point field-goal percentage	FT%	Free-throw percentage
RPG	Rebounds per game	APG	Assists per game	SPG	Steals per game
BPG	Blocks per game	PPG	Points per game	PIR	Performance index rating
**Bold**	Career high	*	Led the league

=== NBA ===
†	Denotes seasons in which Farmar won an NBA championship

==== Regular season ====
Year	Team	GP	GS	MPG	FG%	3P%	FT%	RPG	APG	SPG	BPG	PPG
2006–07	L.A. Lakers	72	2	15.1	.422	.328	.711	1.7	1.9	.6	.1	4.4
2007–08	L.A. Lakers	**82***	0	20.6	.461	.371	.679	2.2	2.7	.9	.1	9.1
2008–09†	L.A. Lakers	65	0	18.3	.391	.336	.584	1.8	2.4	.9	**.2**	6.4
2009–10†	L.A. Lakers	**82***	0	18.0	.435	.376	.671	1.6	1.5	.6	.1	7.2
2010–11	New Jersey	73	**18**	**24.6**	.392	.359	.820	2.4	**5.0**	.8	.1	9.6
2011–12	New Jersey	39	5	21.3	**.467**	.440	.905	1.6	3.3	.6	.1	**10.4**
2013–14	L.A. Lakers	41	5	22.2	.415	.438	.746	**2.5**	4.9	.9	**.2**	10.1
2014–15	L.A. Clippers	36	0	14.7	.386	.361	.909	1.2	1.9	.6	.1	4.6
2015–16	Memphis	12	10	24.3	.420	.356	**1.000**	2.1	3.1	**1.3**	**.2**	9.2
2016–17	Sacramento	2	0	17.5	.333	**.444**	–	1.5	4.5	1.0	.0	6.0
Career		504	40	19.5	.423	.374	.739	1.9	2.9	.8	.1	7.7

==== Playoffs ====
Year	Team	GP	GS	MPG	FG%	3P%	FT%	RPG	APG	SPG	BPG	PPG
2007	L.A. Lakers	5	**5**	22.8	**.429**	.200	.857	**2.8**	1.6	**1.2**	.2	**6.4**
2008	L.A. Lakers	21	0	17.1	.383	.386	.875	1.6	1.3	.3	.2	5.7
2009†	L.A. Lakers	20	1	13.0	.391	.308	.737	1.6	1.7	.5	.2	4.7
2010†	L.A. Lakers	**23**	0	13.1	.404	**.400**	.692	1.2	1.4	.7	.0	4.6
2016	Memphis	4	4	**28.3**	.323	.333	**1.000**	1.5	**4.0**	.8	**.3**	6.8
Career		73	10	15.7	.389	.355	.793	1.5	1.6	.6	.1	5.2

=== EuroLeague ===
Year	Team	GP	GS	MPG	FG%	3P%	FT%	RPG	APG	SPG	BPG	PPG	PIR
2011–12	Maccabi Tel Aviv	7	0	**31.2**	**.500**	**.412**	.783	**4.7**	**4.1**	**1.4**	.0	**14.1**	**17.3**
2012–13	Anadolu Efes	**29**	**27**	29.9	.443	.397	**.863**	3.6	3.9	.8	**.1**	13.8	14.1
2015–16	Maccabi Tel Aviv	8	6	20.4	**.500**	.389	.500	2.4	2.8	.8	**.1**	8.0	8.9
Career		44	33	28.3	.486	.397	.826	3.6	3.7	.9	.1	13.8	12.8

== Personal life ==
On July 29, 2012, Farmar married soccer player Jill Oakes.

Farmar has a tattoo on his left arm of him with his arm around his little half-sister, while the words "just the two of us" surround them. He also has a tattoo across his back that reads "Farmar." He is a Barack Obama supporter, and attended a fundraiser for Obama in Orange County, California.

In 2009, Farmar played himself in the television series Numb3rs.

== Philanthropy ==
In one week in August 2008, he led a basketball camp for Israeli and Palestinian children, having them play together on the same team. He also started Hoop Farm, a children's basketball camp at UCLA which he leads that promotes eco-friendly behavior.

He joined the Chabad Telethon in September 2008, shooting free-throws in order to raise funds. Rabbi Chaim Cunin, executive producer of the telethon and CEO of Chabad of California, said: "Jordan is a real mensch. He raised $66,600 in 90 seconds. He made 37 free throws in 90 seconds."

In 2009, during the summer he was the host of the first annual Jordan Farmar Celebrity Golf Classic, which was held at Sherwood Country Club in Thousand Oaks. The money that was raised was contributed to the Jordan Farmar Foundation, which his mother runs and which is focused on assisting at-risk youths and children who are taking cancer treatment at Mattel Children's Hospital UCLA.

== See also ==
- List of select Jewish basketball players
