= Glen Davis (basketball) =

American basketball player (born 1986)

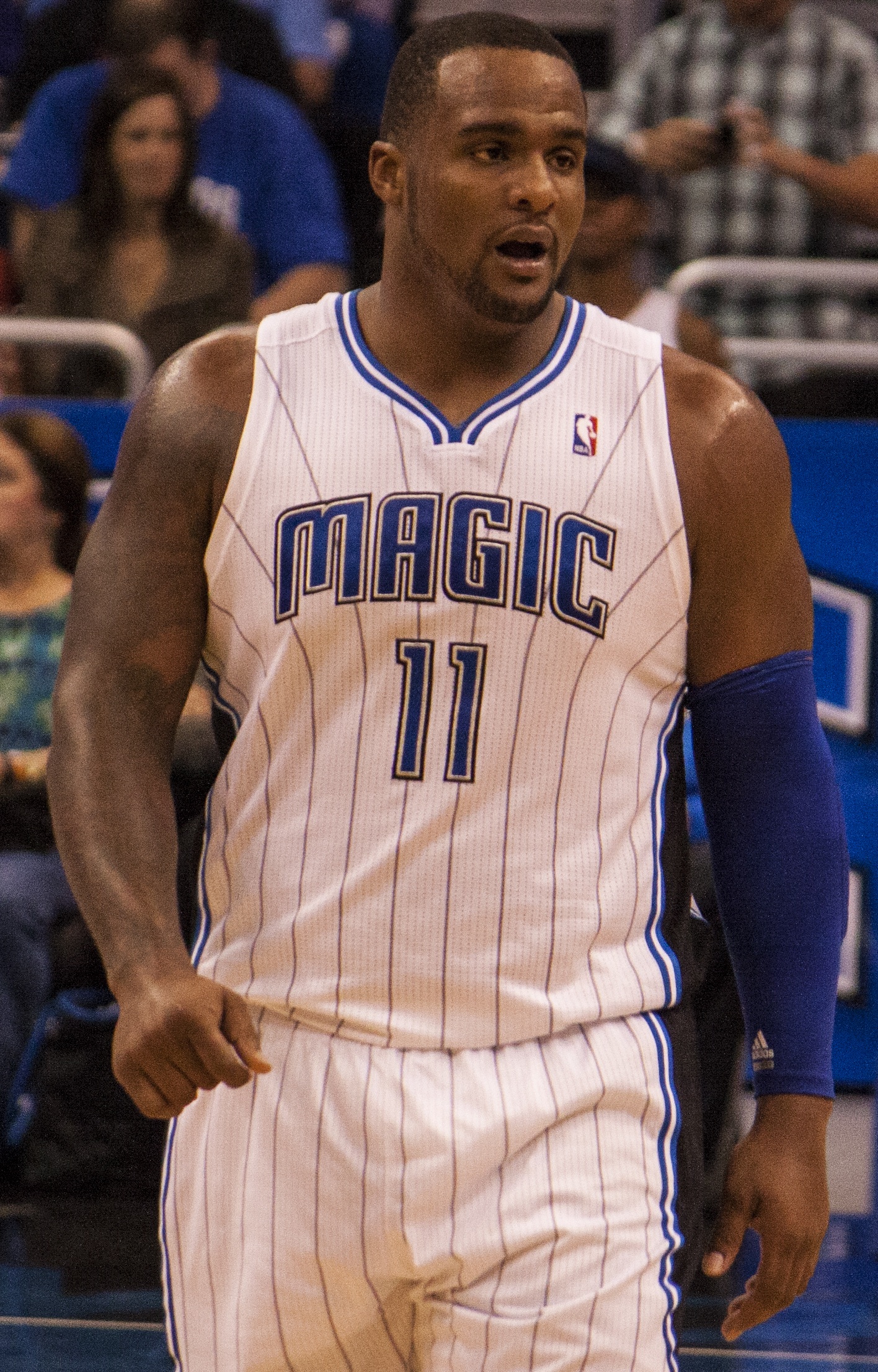
- Davis with the Orlando Magic in 2012

Personal information
- Born: January 1, 1986 (age 40) Baton Rouge, Louisiana, U.S.
- Listed height: 6 ft 9 in (2.06 m)
- Listed weight: 289 lb (131 kg)

Career information
- High school: LSU Laboratory School (Baton Rouge, Louisiana)
- College: LSU (2004–2007)
- NBA draft: 2007: 2nd round, 35th overall pick
- Drafted by: Seattle SuperSonics
- Playing career: 2007–2015; 2018–2019
- Position: Center / power forward

Career history
- 2007–2011: Boston Celtics
- 2011–2014: Orlando Magic
- 2014–2015: Los Angeles Clippers
- 2018–2019: St. John's Edge

Career highlights
- NBA champion (2008); Second-team All-American – SN (2006); Third-team All-American – AP (2006); Pete Newell Big Man Award (2006); SEC Player of the Year (2006); SEC Rookie of the Year (2005); 2× First-team All-SEC (2006, 2007); Second-team All-SEC (2005); McDonald's All-American (2004); First-team Parade All-American (2004); Louisiana Mr. Basketball (2004)

Career NBA statistics
- Points: 4,111 (8.0 ppg)
- Rebounds: 2,236 (4.4 rpg)
- Assists: 457 (0.9 apg)
- Stats at NBA.com
- Stats at Basketball Reference

Ronald Glen Davis (born January 1, 1986) is an American former professional basketball player. Nicknamed "Big Baby", he played for the Boston Celtics, Orlando Magic, Los Angeles Clippers, and St. John’s Edge.

After playing college basketball with the LSU Tigers, Davis was selected by the Seattle SuperSonics with the 35th overall pick in the 2007 NBA draft. Shortly thereafter, he was traded to the Boston Celtics, with whom he won the 2008 NBA Finals.

== Amateur career ==
Davis attended Louisiana State University Laboratory School in Baton Rouge, Louisiana. Considered a five-star recruit by Rivals.com, Davis was listed as the No. 3 power forward and the No. 13 player in the nation in 2004.

Davis attended Louisiana State University (LSU) and played college basketball for the LSU Tigers. The Southeastern Conference's (SEC) coaches voted Davis the 2006 SEC Player of the Year, and he was also named to the All-SEC first team. In 2006 as a sophomore, Davis led the Tigers to their first Final Four appearance since 1986. In the crucial game of the national semifinals, LSU lost to UCLA, trailing by a wide margin in the first half and never managing a comeback. Davis scored 17 points and made 4 out of 10 free throws before eventually fouling out.

== Professional career ==
=== Boston Celtics (2007–2011) ===
On March 20, 2007, Davis held a press conference to announce that he would forgo his junior season at LSU and enter his name into the 2007 NBA draft. On March 20, 2007, it was reported that he had signed with agent John Hamilton of Performance Sports Management to represent him.

Davis was drafted by the Seattle SuperSonics with the 35th overall pick in the 2007 NBA draft behind Kevin Durant who was picked 2nd and Carl Landry who was picked 31st overall by the team. The rights to Davis and Ray Allen were traded to the Boston Celtics for Delonte West, Wally Szczerbiak, and the rights to the 5th overall pick in the 2007 NBA draft, Jeff Green.

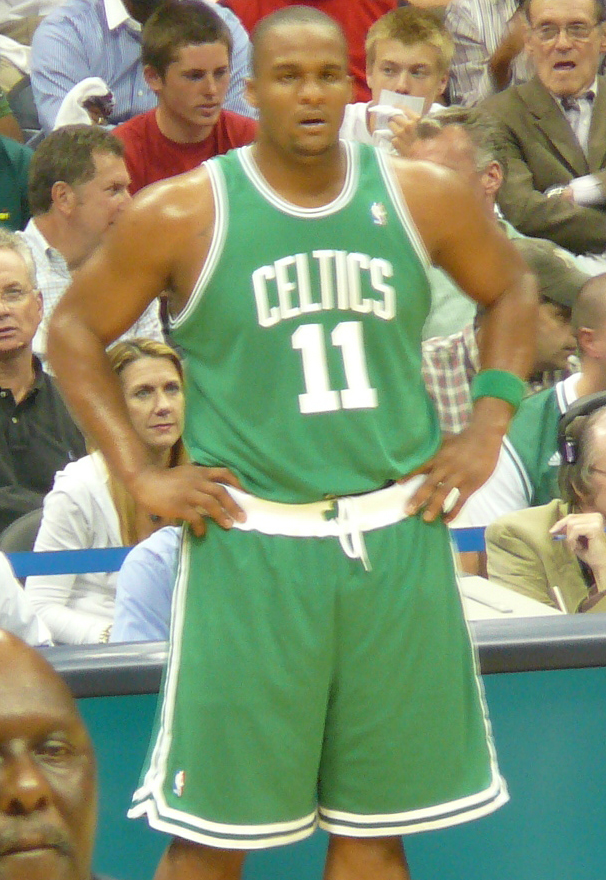
Davis in Game 4 of the 2008 NBA Playoffs against the Atlanta Hawks

Davis was on the Celtics' 2007 summer league team. With the departures of Ryan Gomes, Gerald Green, and Al Jefferson, Davis was expecting to see a lot of playing time his rookie season. Though he is primarily a power forward, Davis also spent some time playing as the team's backup center in the regular season.

After coming off the bench for the first 19 games of the season, Davis made his first NBA start against the Sacramento Kings on December 12, 2007, in place of injured center Kendrick Perkins. Playing at power forward with Kevin Garnett taking Perkins' place at center, he scored 16 points and pulled down 9 rebounds as the Celtics won the game 90–78. His breakout performance took place against the Detroit Pistons on January 5, 2008, as he scored 16 of his 20 points in the fourth quarter, including the last basket of the game. The Celtics would win the 2008 NBA Finals in Davis's rookie season by defeating the Los Angeles Lakers in six games in the finals.

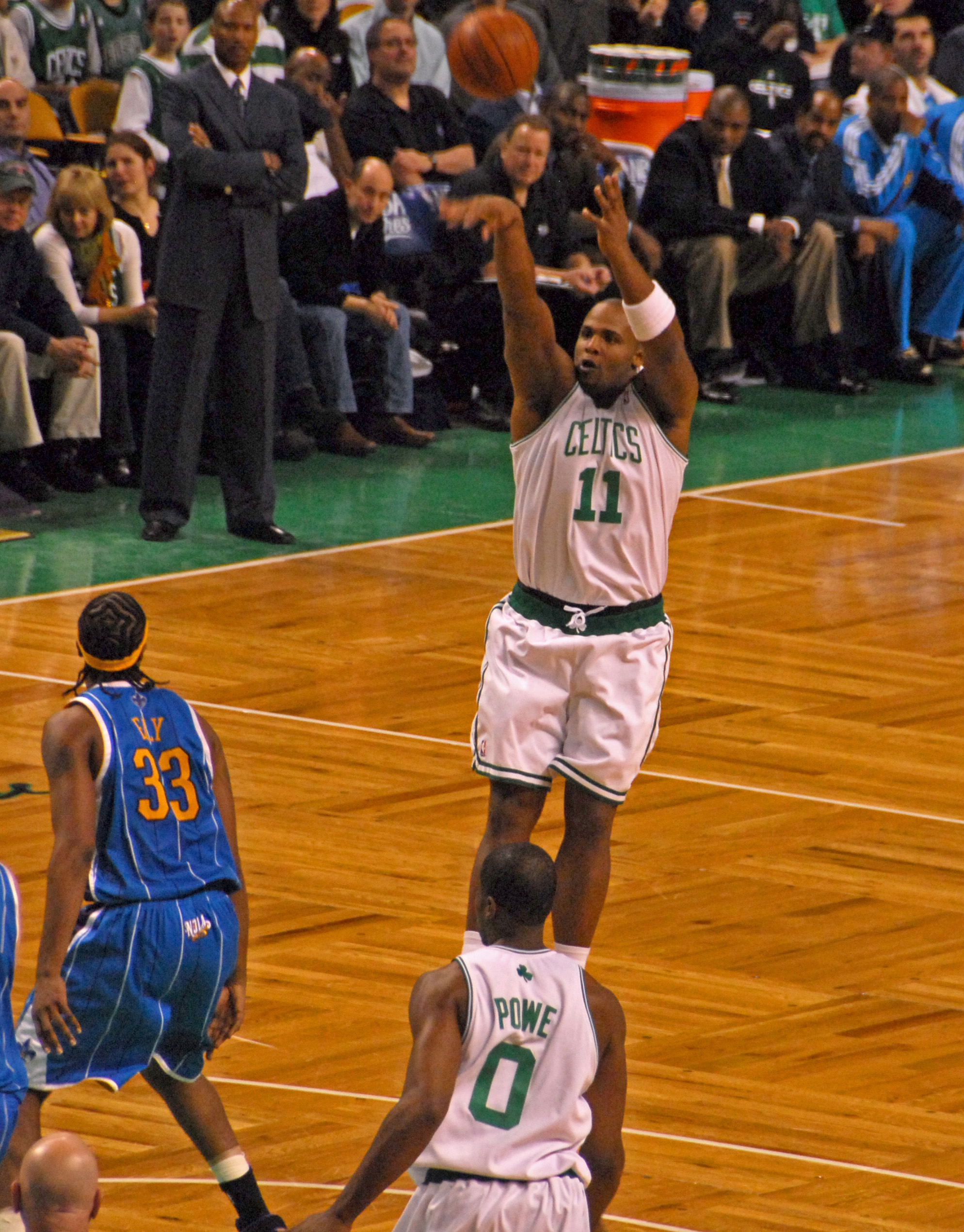
Davis takes a shot in 2008

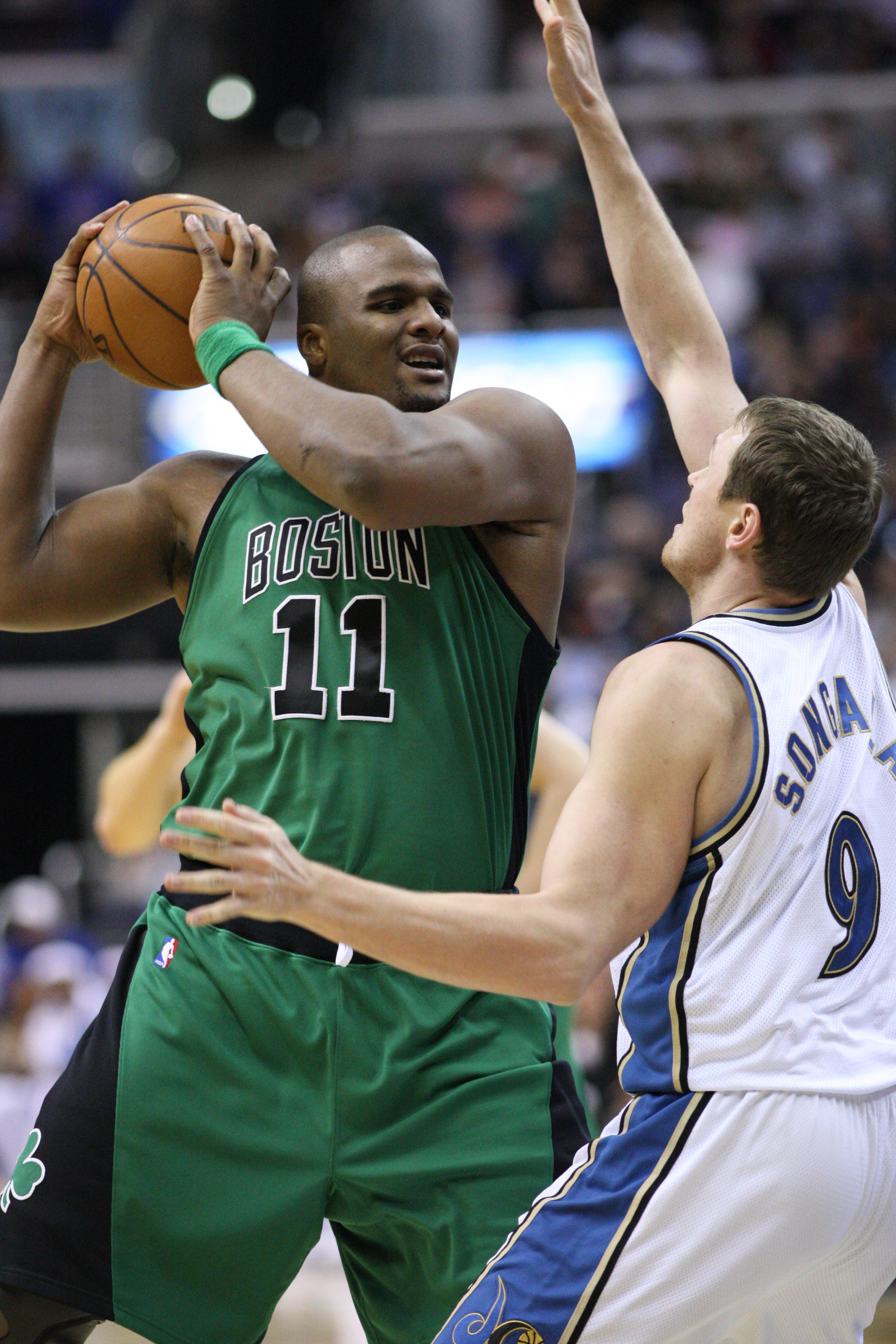
Davis holds the ball in 2011

On March 21, 2009, Davis scored a then-career-high 24 points against the Memphis Grizzlies in the Celtics' 105–87 win in Memphis.

In the 2009 NBA Playoffs, Davis had significant playing time after injuries to Kevin Garnett and Leon Powe. In Game Four of the 2009 Eastern Conference Semifinals against the Orlando Magic, Davis made two key shots, including a buzzer beater, in the final seconds of the game to give the Celtics the 95–94 win over the Magic. After the shot, Davis accidentally jostled a twelve-year-old fan while running down the court in celebration. The boy's father complained to NBA and Celtics officials but later retracted his demand for an apology. Davis apologized nevertheless, and said that, "I'm a big guy. Imagine if my emotions are going so wild, and if I'm running by somebody, I don’t feel them. If I've hurt anybody or if I’ve done any harm to anybody, please forgive me because my intentions were harmless."

On August 10, 2009, Davis signed a two-year, $6.5 million contract with the Celtics. On May 27, 2010, during the 2010 Eastern Conference Finals against the Orlando Magic in Game 5, Glen Davis suffered a severe concussion when he got elbowed in the face by Dwight Howard. Davis would play in the Game 6 clincher, finishing with 6 points and 7 rebounds as they advanced to the 2010 NBA Finals. The Celtics would face the Los Angeles Lakers in a rematch of the 2008 championship. In Game 4, Davis had 18 points and 5 rebounds to tie the series. The Celtics fell in seven games.

=== Orlando Magic (2011–2014) ===
On December 12, 2011, Davis was signed and traded to the Orlando Magic along with Von Wafer for Brandon Bass, signing a 4-year, $26 million contract. On April 3, 2012, Davis scored a then-career-high 31 points in a 95–102 loss to the Detroit Pistons.

On December 3, 2013, he recorded a career high 33 points, along with 3 rebounds and 3 assists, in a double-overtime loss to the Philadelphia 76ers.

On February 21, 2014, Davis and the Magic mutually agreed to a contract buyout.

=== Los Angeles Clippers (2014–2015) ===
On February 24, 2014, Davis signed with the Los Angeles Clippers. On March 29, 2014, coach Doc Rivers had security escort Davis to the locker room after the two exchanged words when Rivers removed him from the game against the Houston Rockets. On July 19, 2014, Davis re-signed with the Clippers on a one-year deal.

Davis became an unrestricted free agent following the 2014–15 season and had left ankle surgery in September 2015, sidelining him from basketball-related activities for eight to 12 weeks.

=== St. John's Edge (2018–2019) ===
In September 2018, Davis was announced as a new player for Zadar of the Croatian League and the ABA League, but failed to make a final agreement with the club management, consequently leaving the team before signing a contract.

On December 5, 2018, Davis signed with the St. John's Edge of the National Basketball League of Canada. In the 2018–19 season, Davis averaged 17.3 points, 7.4 rebounds, and 3.0 assists per game. He was named to the All-NBLC Third Team.

== Personal life ==
In the summer of 2001, at only 15 years of age, Davis attended a basketball camp run by LSU alumnus and future Boston Celtic teammate Shaquille O'Neal on the campus of Louisiana State University. O'Neal challenged Davis to a friendly wrestling match, in which Davis lifted the 7 ft 1 in (2.16 m), 325 lb (147 kg; 23.2 st) center and body-slammed him to the ground. The encounter left a strong impression on O'Neal; ultimately, the incident helped Davis to get introduced to former LSU head coach Dale Brown.

His nickname is Big Baby, given to him at the age of 9 by a youth league coach. At 5 ft 6 in (1.68 m), 160 lb (73 kg), he was too large to play pee-wee and played as a senior. When Davis felt he was being bullied by his older opponents, Davis' coach was known to say, "Stop crying, you big baby."

On December 21, 2008, Davis was injured in a car accident while driving to a game against the New York Knicks; he suffered a concussion and whiplash. In 2013, he adopted a vegan diet for health reasons.

In November 2016, Davis put his basketball career "on hold" as he ventured into film production.

=== Legal issues ===
On February 7, 2018, Davis was arrested for drug possession and drug distribution after police found 126 grams of marijuana (1 ounce). Also a briefcase containing $92,000 in cash inside his hotel room in Aberdeen, Maryland. Davis agreed to pay the maximum fine of $15,000 in exchange for moving the case to the stet docket, a legal disposition in the State of Maryland meaning the court agrees to indefinitely suspend the case and not pursue the charges.

On October 7, 2021, Davis, along with 18 other former NBA players, were indicted by a federal grand jury in the Southern District of New York on charges of conspiracy to commit health care fraud and wire fraud for allegedly defrauding the NBA's health and welfare benefit plan. He is alleged to have filed fraudulent insurance claims for reimbursement. On November 15, 2023, Davis was found guilty of committing health care fraud. On May 9, 2024, Davis was sentenced to 40 months in prison, in addition to $80,000 in restitution. Davis was released from prison on March 12, 2026, and will enter the Long Beach Residential Reentry Management Office, more commonly known as a halfway house, until July 9, 2026. After he completes his time at the facility, Davis will face three years of supervised release.

== BIG3 ==
In the 2018 season, Davis helped Power win the BIG3 championship.

== NBA career statistics ==
Legend
| GP | Games played | GS | Games started | MPG | Minutes per game |
| FG% | Field goal percentage | 3P% | 3-point field goal percentage | FT% | Free throw percentage |
| RPG | Rebounds per game | APG | Assists per game | SPG | Steals per game |
| BPG | Blocks per game | PPG | Points per game | **Bold** | Career high |
| † | Won an NBA championship |

=== Regular season ===
| Year | Team | GP | GS | MPG | FG% | 3P% | FT% | RPG | APG | SPG | BPG | PPG |
|---|---|---|---|---|---|---|---|---|---|---|---|---|
| 2007–08† | Boston | 69 | 1 | 13.6 | **.484** | .000 | .660 | 3.0 | .4 | .4 | .3 | 4.5 |
| 2008–09 | Boston | 76 | 16 | 21.5 | .442 | **.400** | .730 | 4.0 | .9 | .7 | .3 | 7.0 |
| 2009–10 | Boston | 54 | 1 | 17.3 | .437 | .000 | .696 | 3.8 | .6 | .4 | .3 | 6.3 |
| 2010–11 | Boston | **78** | 13 | 29.5 | .448 | .133 | **.736** | 5.4 | 1.2 | **1.0** | .4 | 11.7 |
| 2011–12 | Orlando | 61 | 13 | 23.4 | .421 | .143 | .683 | 5.4 | .8 | .7 | .3 | 9.3 |
| 2012–13 | Orlando | 34 | 33 | **31.3** | .448 | .000 | .718 | **7.2** | **2.1** | .9 | **.6** | **15.1** |
| 2013–14 | Orlando | 45 | **43** | 30.1 | .453 | **.400** | .675 | 6.3 | 1.6 | 1.0 | .5 | 12.1 |
| 2013–14 | L.A. Clippers | 23 | 1 | 13.4 | .481 | .000 | .783 | 3.0 | .3 | .5 | .3 | 4.2 |
| 2014–15 | L.A. Clippers | 74 | 0 | 12.2 | .459 | .000 | .632 | 2.3 | .5 | .6 | .3 | 4.0 |
| Career | | 514 | 121 | 21.1 | .447 | .182 | .700 | 4.4 | .9 | .7 | .3 | 8.0 |

=== Playoffs ===
| Year | Team | GP | GS | MPG | FG% | 3P% | FT% | RPG | APG | SPG | BPG | PPG |
|---|---|---|---|---|---|---|---|---|---|---|---|---|
| 2008† | Boston | 17 | 0 | 8.1 | .412 | .000 | .611 | 1.5 | .4 | .3 | .2 | 2.3 |
| 2009 | Boston | 14 | **14** | 36.4 | .491 | .000 | .710 | 5.6 | **1.8** | **1.3** | .6 | 15.8 |
| 2010 | Boston | **24** | 1 | 20.1 | .476 | .000 | .722 | 4.5 | .4 | .8 | .4 | 7.3 |
| 2011 | Boston | 9 | 0 | 21.2 | .391 | .000 | .727 | 3.6 | .9 | .3 | .0 | 4.9 |
| 2012 | Orlando | 5 | 5 | **38.0** | .438 | .000 | .773 | **9.2** | .8 | .6 | **1.2** | **19.0** |
| 2014 | L.A. Clippers | 13 | 0 | 12.2 | **.610** | .000 | .000 | 2.8 | .7 | .2 | .2 | 3.8 |
| 2015 | L.A. Clippers | 14 | 0 | 10.3 | .447 | .000 | **.778** | 1.9 | .2 | .4 | .4 | 2.9 |
| Career | | 96 | 20 | 18.9 | .472 | .000 | .716 | 3.7 | .7 | .6 | .4 | 6.9 |
