= Delonte West =

American Basketball player (born 1983)

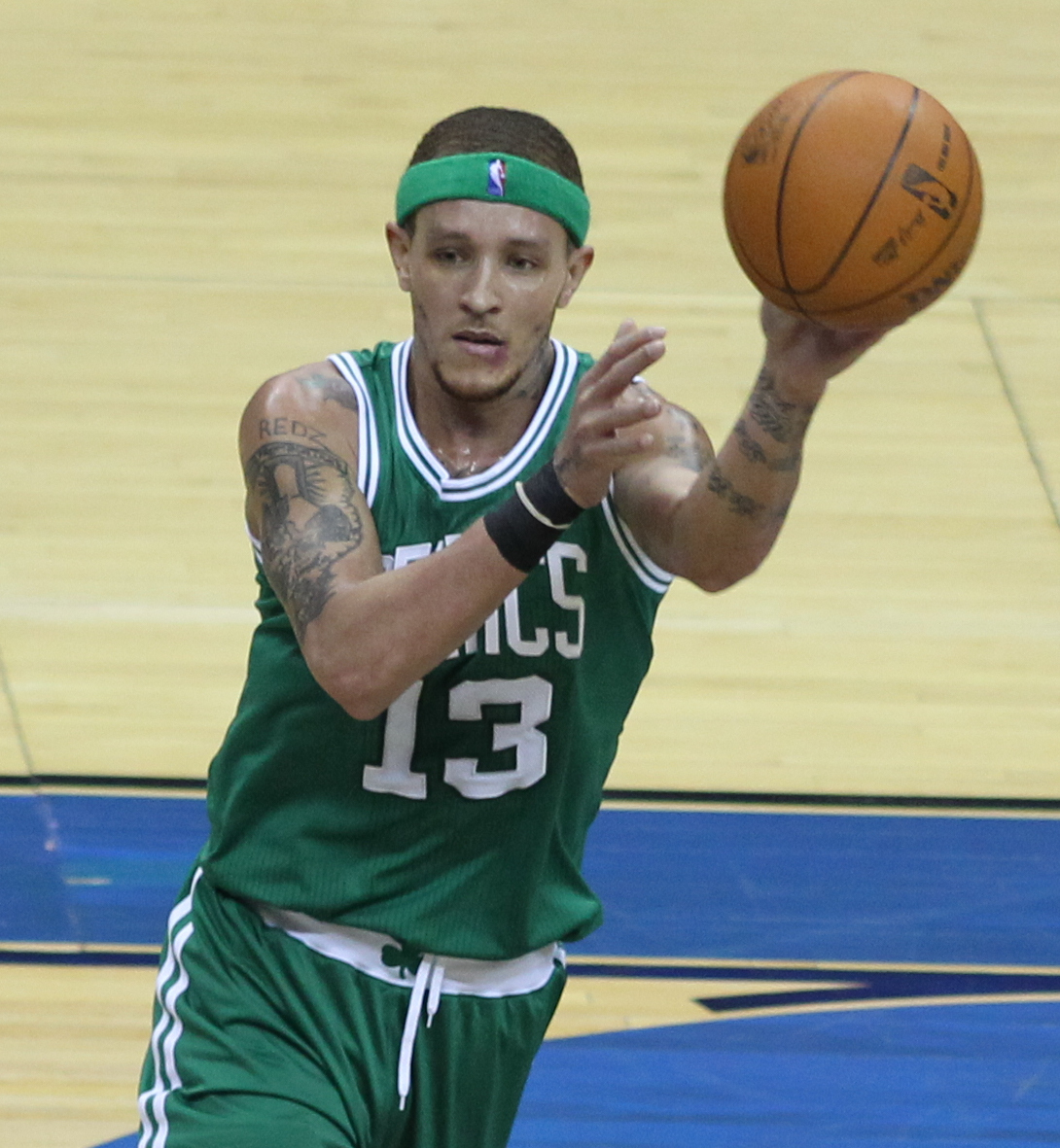
- West with the Boston Celtics in 2011

Personal information
- Born: July 26, 1983 (age 43) Washington, D.C., U.S.
- Listed height: 6 ft 3 in (1.91 m)
- Listed weight: 180 lb (82 kg)

Career information
- High school: Eleanor Roosevelt (Greenbelt, Maryland)
- College: Saint Joseph's (2001–2004)
- NBA draft: 2004: 1st round, 24th overall pick
- Drafted by: Boston Celtics
- Playing career: 2004–2015
- Position: Point guard / shooting guard
- Number: 13, 2

Career history
- 2004–2007: Boston Celtics
- 2007–2008: Seattle SuperSonics
- 2008–2010: Cleveland Cavaliers
- 2010–2011: Boston Celtics
- 2011–2012: Dallas Mavericks
- 2013: Texas Legends
- 2013–2014: Fujian Xunxing
- 2014: Shanghai Sharks
- 2015: Texas Legends

Career highlights
- Third-team All-American – NABC, SN (2004); 2× First-team All-Atlantic 10 (2003, 2004)

Career NBA statistics
- Points: 4,198 (9.7 ppg)
- Rebounds: 1,265 (2.9 rpg)
- Assists: 1,540 (3.6 apg)
- Stats at NBA.com
- Stats at Basketball Reference

Delonte Maurice West (deh-LAHN-tay; born July 26, 1983) is an American former professional basketball player. He played in the National Basketball Association (NBA) for the Boston Celtics, Seattle SuperSonics, Cleveland Cavaliers, and Dallas Mavericks. He also played professionally for the Fujian Xunxing and Shanghai Sharks of the Chinese Basketball Association and the Texas Legends of the NBA Development League. Prior to playing professionally, West played college basketball for the Saint Joseph's Hawks.

== Early life ==
Delonte Maurice West was born on July 26, 1983, in Washington, D.C., and grew up in Prince George's County, Maryland. He was raised in poverty, often moving between homes and family members—a period he later described as "happy‑poor". Of mixed African American, Native American (Piscataway), and White heritage, West's light skin and reddish hair made him a target for teasing and bullying during his early school years.

During middle school, West faced significant mental health struggles. After a leg injury in eighth grade sidelined him from basketball, his mother sent him to live with his father in Louisa County, Virginia—a move that precipitated self‑harm and prescription drug abuse. He spent time in and out of children's hospitals and made multiple suicide attempts during his teen years.

West went to Eleanor Roosevelt High School in Greenbelt, Maryland, where he excelled at basketball, teaming with fellow future NBA player Eddie Basden. He led the Roosevelt Raiders to their first state tournament appearance. They made it to the Maryland 4A championship, where West had 22 points and 8 rebounds, but the Raiders lost 70–58. He was named Washington Post All Met Basketball Player of the Year due to his averages of 20.2 points, 6.5 rebounds, 3.9 assists, and 3.1 steals per game.

== College career ==
At Saint Joseph's University, West formed what was widely regarded as the best backcourt in the country along with John R. Wooden Award and Naismith Award winner Jameer Nelson. As a junior, West averaged 18.9 points and 6.7 assists per game, shooting 41% from three-point range. His efforts helped the 2003–04 Saint Joseph's Hawks to go 27–0 in the regular season and earn an Elite Eight appearance in the NCAA Tournament. Saint Joseph's finished the season at 30–2.

== Professional career ==
=== Boston Celtics (2004–2007) ===
West chose to leave St. Joseph's after his junior campaign where he was selected by the Boston Celtics as the 24th pick in the 2004 NBA draft. In his first season, he struggled with injuries, playing a total of just 39 games, mostly coming off the bench. He averaged 4.5 points, 1.7 rebounds and 1.6 assists per game. After making the transition to point guard in his rookie season, West was named the starting point guard at the beginning of the 2005–06 season by head coach Doc Rivers.

In 2005–06, West averaged 11.8 PPG, 4.1 RPG and 4.6 APG. On February 12, 2006, he was named to represent the Celtics on the sophomore team for the Rookie Challenge at NBA All-Star Weekend. Coincidentally, he replaced his college teammate Jameer Nelson, who withdrew because of injuries.

=== Seattle SuperSonics (2007–2008) ===
After three seasons in Boston, on June 27, 2007, he was traded along with Wally Szczerbiak and the 5th overall pick in the 2007 NBA draft (Jeff Green) to the Seattle SuperSonics in exchange for Ray Allen and Glen Davis.

=== Cleveland Cavaliers (2008–2010) ===
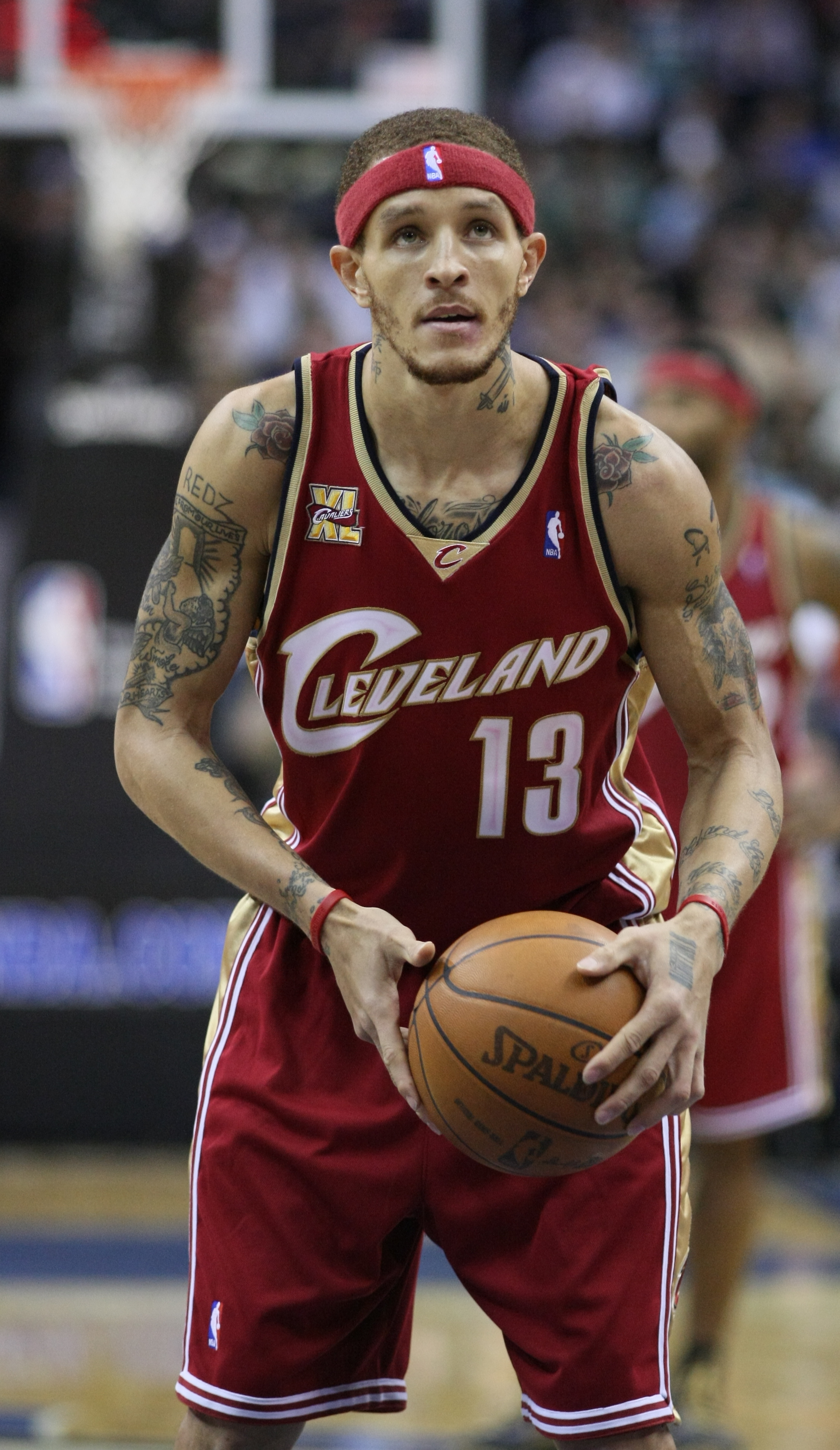
West with the Cavaliers in 2009

==== 2007–08 season ====
On February 21, 2008, West was part of a three-team trade that sent him, Ben Wallace, Joe Smith, and Wally Szczerbiak to the Cleveland Cavaliers. The trade also sent Larry Hughes, Shannon Brown, Drew Gooden, and Cedric Simmons to the Chicago Bulls and Donyell Marshall, Ira Newble, and Adrian Griffin to Seattle. He was reunited with his Saint Joseph's teammate Dwayne Jones.

As a Cavalier, West played in 26 regular season games (starting all 26), and averaged 10.3 points, 4.5 assists, 3.7 rebounds and 1.1 steals. He had a season high 20 points against the Boston Celtics only six days after his trade to the Cavaliers and a season-high 11 assists on March 30, 2008, against the Philadelphia 76ers. For the entire season, West played in 61 games (starting 31) and averaged 8.3 points, 3.8 assists and 3.2 rebounds.

On April 27, 2008, West made perhaps the most timely 3-pointer of his NBA career with 5.4 seconds left in a playoff game against the Washington Wizards, in Washington. His tie-breaking game-winner took the Cleveland Cavaliers to a 3–1 lead in this first round series.

==== 2008–09 season ====
On September 12, 2008, West signed a three-year, $12.7 million contract with the Cavaliers. He was moved to the starting shooting guard position at the beginning of the season, due to the acquisition of Mo Williams.

He became a starter for the Cavaliers, who won a league-best and franchise-record 66 games during the regular season and went 39–2 at home. In addition to his role as the starting shooting guard, he also served as the backup point guard, manning the position when Mo Williams was not in the game. He emerged as a talented backcourt defensive player, guarding a variety of players ranging from the 6 ft 3 in (1.91 m) Ben Gordon to the 6 ft 10 in (2.08 m) Hedo Türkoğlu. Offensively, he proved to be a capable outside shooter, with a field-goal percentage of 46% (and 40% on three-pointers), and maintained his reputation as an athletic and hard-nosed driver with the ball. West, Williams, Zydrunas Ilgauskas, and Anderson Varejão came together to form a supporting cast for franchise player LeBron James.

On March 2, 2009, against the Miami Heat, West set a career high with eight steals.

In the playoffs, West's averages shot up to nearly 14 points per game, despite struggling with his three-point shot much like his backcourt-mate Williams, whose shooting struggles in the playoffs were well documented. Further, the Cavs' lack of scoring punch on the bench forced West to take on extremely high minute loads. He averaged 42 minutes per game throughout the postseason, and in the Eastern Conference Finals against the Orlando Magic (which the Cavs lost in six games due in part to, again, outside shooting struggles from Williams and West) he played over 45 minutes per game, more than any other player in the series. In addition to this, he drew the defensive assignment of Hedo Türkoğlu, who had a seven-inch height advantage, to allow James to play the "rover". West was able to stop Türkoğlu's facilitation of the Magic offense in spurts, but the height advantage was too much, as Türkoğlu helped to dominate the Cavalier defense throughout the series. West set a new career playoff high in points, with 22 in a losing effort in Game 6 against the Magic when the Cavs were eliminated.

==== 2009–10 season ====
Over the 2009–10 season, Delonte West averaged 8.8 points in 25 minutes per game with only three games as a starter for the Cavs. In the 2010 NBA Playoffs, the Cavaliers lost in the Conference Semifinals series to the Boston Celtics in six games. West averaged 6.7 points in the playoffs.

=== Return to Celtics (2010–2011) ===
After LeBron James left the Cavaliers to sign with the Miami Heat, the Cavaliers traded West, along with Sebastian Telfair, to the Minnesota Timberwolves for Ramon Sessions, Ryan Hollins, and a future draft pick. The Timberwolves waived West shortly after acquiring him.

On September 1, 2010, the Boston Celtics signed West to a one-year contract to back up Rajon Rondo as a point guard.

West was suspended for the first ten games of the 2010–11 season following a guilty plea to weapons charges in Maryland. For the 2010–11 season, West finished with 5.6 points per game, 0.8 steals per game, and 2.7 assists per game. He also shot .867 from the free throw line.

=== Dallas Mavericks (2011–2012) ===
West signed with the Dallas Mavericks on December 13, 2011. During the 2011–12 season, he averaged 9.6 points per game. He re-signed with the Mavericks on July 26, 2012.

West was suspended indefinitely following an argument after a preseason loss on October 15, 2012. He was reinstated after one day, but suspended again on October 25 for the same reason after another preseason loss. On October 29, 2012, West was waived by the Mavericks.

=== Texas Legends (2013) ===
On January 25, 2013, West was acquired by the Texas Legends of the NBA D-League. On March 16, 2013, West made his debut for the Legends with 10 points in an 85–103 loss to the Santa Cruz Warriors.

=== Fujian Xunxing (2013–2014) ===
In October 2013, West signed a one-year deal with Fujian Xunxing of China.

=== Shanghai Sharks (2014) ===
In July 2014, West joined the Los Angeles Clippers for the 2014 NBA Summer League.

In September 2014, West signed a one-year deal with the Shanghai Sharks, returning to China for a second stint. However, he was released by the team on November 18 after just four games despite a 29-point debut game in the season opener on November 1.

=== Return to Legends (2015) ===
On January 12, 2015, West signed with Guaros de Lara of the Venezuelan Liga Profesional de Baloncesto but left the team before playing in a game for them.

On March 12, 2015, West was reacquired by the Texas Legends and appeared for them that night against the Delaware 87ers. In 19 minutes off the bench, he recorded 10 points and six rebounds in a 122–119 loss. On April 2, he was waived by the Legends after suffering a season-ending injury.

== Exhibition boxing bout against Michael Beasley ==
West was knocked out by Michael Beasley on October 16, 2026. Beasley was awarded a TKO victory after West took a hard right hand from his opponent. The event was part of Adin Ross’ Brand Risk 16. It took place at Brand Risk Arena in Miami, Florida.

== Personal life ==
West was diagnosed with bipolar disorder in 2008. While he initially accepted the diagnosis, he later disputed it, suggesting that his difficulties arose from a combination of temporary depression and the stresses of a basketball player lifestyle.

On September 17, 2009, West was pulled over near his home in Maryland, for a traffic violation while riding a Can-Am Spyder three-wheeled motorcycle. During this stop, it was discovered that West had a 9mm Beretta pistol in his waistband, a Ruger .357 Magnum revolver strapped to his leg, and a Remington 870 shotgun in a guitar case across his back. He was subsequently arrested and had a court appearance on November 20. West contended that he was moving the weapons to a different location because his mother had informed him that his cousins' children had stumbled upon them in a closet at his home. West pleaded guilty to the traffic and weapons charges and was sentenced to electronic monitoring, unsupervised probation, and 40 hours of community service as well as psychological counseling.

While West has bought homes for each of his parents and has provided other financial support for relatives, he has also experienced financial difficulties. During the 2011 NBA lockout, he applied for a job at Home Depot and worked at a furniture store.

West's first marriage ended in divorce in 2010. He married Caressa Madden in 2013 and had two children. They divorced in 2020.

In February 2016, West was photographed in a public place in Houston, Texas, while barefoot and wearing a hospital gown. In June 2016, a photo of West panhandling in Temple Hills, Maryland, went viral. The photo sparked speculation that West was homeless, as the Twitter account that broke the photo suggested as such and asked his followers to pray for West given his psychological issues. West immediately denied the rumors, stating that, while the photo is genuine, he has a home and was merely assisting someone who actually was homeless, since the homeless man was quadriplegic.

In January 2020, a video surfaced online showing West in handcuffs on a Washington, D.C., highway. In the same month, it was reported that West worked as a scout for the Boston Celtics but was not able to follow through with the role.

On September 28, 2020, after photos circulated showing West panhandling at an intersection in Dallas, Texas, Mavericks owner Mark Cuban picked up West from a gas station. Cuban paid for drug rehabilitation treatment and provided West a hotel room to stay in. On January 19, 2021, reports came in that West now had a job at the rehab facility where he checked in and had reunited with his mother. In July 2022, new videos came to light showing West begging again, this time in Virginia.

On October 15, 2022, West was arrested again in Fairfax County, Virginia, after being seen trying to enter a car that did not belong to him. He was booked on four misdemeanor charges.

On June 6, 2024, West was arrested again in Fairfax County, Virginia, for violating the terms of his previous release and resisting arrest. He was found unresponsive by police officers after a brief chase, and was administered Narcan. When that did not have the desired effect, he was taken to a local hospital and administered a second dose, which did work. He was released after being charged. Later that same month, West was captured on video by worried onlookers stumbling around a parking lot in Arlington, Virginia.

On November 2, 2024, West was accused of trespassing and arrested by the Fairfax County Police Department. He was held on a $1,000 bond and released on November 3.

On November 3, 2025, West was found unconscious in Fairfax County, Virginia. After Fairfax County police determined he was intoxicated, he was arrested for his own safety and protection. He was later released on bond.

On December 21, 2025, West was arrested in Fairfax County, Virginia for assault and robbery (of $23). He was released on a $1,000 bond.

== Career statistics ==
Legend
GP	Games played	GS	Games started	MPG	Minutes per game
FG%	Field goal percentage	3P%	3-point field goal percentage	FT%	Free throw percentage
RPG	Rebounds per game	APG	Assists per game	SPG	Steals per game
BPG	Blocks per game	PPG	Points per game	**Bold**	Career high

=== College ===
Year	Team	GP	GS	MPG	FG%	3P%	FT%	RPG	APG	SPG	BPG	PPG
2001–02	Saint Joseph's	31	2	17.0	.469	.118	.667	3.0	1.2	.8	.1	5.9
2002–03	Saint Joseph's	26	22	30.2	.474	.374	.814	4.3	3.2	1.6	**.2**	17.3
2003–04	Saint Joseph's	**32**	**32**	**33.5**	**.510**	**.412**	**.892**	**5.4**	**4.7**	**1.7**	**.2**	**18.9**
Career		89	56	26.8	.489	.377	.831	4.2	3.0	1.4	.2	13.9

=== NBA ===
==== Regular season ====
Year	Team	GP	GS	MPG	FG%	3P%	FT%	RPG	APG	SPG	BPG	PPG
2004–05	Boston	39	7	13.0	.426	.358	.704	1.7	1.4	.5	.2	4.3
2005–06	Boston	**71**	**71**	**34.1**	**.487**	.385	.851	**4.1**	**4.6**	1.2	.6	11.8
2006–07	Boston	69	47	32.2	.427	.365	.853	3.0	4.4	1.1	.5	**12.2**
2007–08	Seattle	35	5	20.8	.388	.339	.667	2.7	3.2	.9	.3	6.8
2007–08	Cleveland	26	26	31.0	.440	.367	.788	3.7	4.5	1.1	**.7**	10.3
2008–09	Cleveland	64	64	33.6	.457	**.399**	.833	3.2	3.5	**1.5**	.2	11.7
2009–10	Cleveland	60	3	25.0	.445	.325	.810	2.8	3.3	.9	.5	8.8
2010–11	Boston	24	2	18.9	.458	.364	.867	1.5	2.7	.8	.4	5.6
2011–12	Dallas	44	33	24.1	.461	.355	**.886**	2.3	3.2	1.3	.3	9.6
Career		432	258	27.4	.448	.372	.826	2.9	3.6	1.1	.4	9.7

==== Playoffs ====
Year	Team	GP	GS	MPG	FG%	3P%	FT%	RPG	APG	SPG	BPG	PPG
2005	Boston	7	3	16.4	**.524**	.455	.500	1.3	.6	1.0	.1	4.1
2008	Cleveland	13	13	34.8	.400	.429	.854	3.3	**4.2**	1.2	**.5**	10.8
2009	Cleveland	**14**	**14**	**42.2**	.465	.333	.833	**3.5**	4.1	**1.4**	**.5**	**13.8**
2010	Cleveland	11	0	24.5	.418	.158	.938	1.9	2.6	.8	.3	6.7
2011	Boston	9	0	18.9	.468	.368	.800	1.9	1.3	.6	.0	6.6
2012	Dallas	4	3	22.0	.423	**.500**	**1.000**	1.8	2.0	.8	.0	7.5
Career		58	33	29.0	.442	.361	.847	2.5	2.8	1.0	.3	9.1

== See also ==
- List of people banned or suspended by the NBA
