= 2010–11 Boston Celtics season =

Season of National Basketball Association team the Boston Celtics

- Division champions
- Head coach: Doc Rivers
- President: Danny Ainge
- General manager: Danny Ainge
- Owners: Boston Basketball Partners
- Arena: TD Garden

Results
- Record: 56–26 (.683)
- Place: Division: 1st (Atlantic); Conference: 3rd (Eastern)
- Playoff finish: Conference Semifinals (lost to Heat 1–4)
- Stats at Basketball Reference

Local media
- Television: CSN New England
- Radio: WEEI

The 2010–11 Boston Celtics season was the 65th season of the Boston Celtics in the National Basketball Association (NBA). The Celtics were coming off of an NBA Finals loss to their rivals, the Los Angeles Lakers, in seven games.

On June 30, 2010, Doc Rivers announced that he would return to coach the Celtics after speculating that he would resign in order to spend time with his family.

With the off-season acquisitions of former all-stars Shaquille O'Neal and Jermaine O'Neal, the Celtics started the year at 41–14 and were on top of the Eastern Conference standings during the All-Star break. However, after center Kendrick Perkins, who was working his way back from a torn MCL and PCL in last year's Finals, was traded to the Oklahoma City Thunder mid-season, the Celtics only won 15 of their final 27 games. Still, they managed a 56–26 record and enter the playoffs as the 3rd seed in the Eastern Conference.

In the playoffs, they swept the New York Knicks in the first round to advance to the conference semifinals, where they faced the Miami Heat. The Celtics had defeated the Heat in five games in last season's First Round, after which the Heat had added LeBron James and Chris Bosh to join Dwyane Wade. The new-look Heat proved too much for the Celtics and easily won the series in five games, knocking Boston out of the playoffs. Following the season, Shaquille O'Neal retired after playing 19 seasons in the league.

The Big Four of Kevin Garnett, Paul Pierce, Ray Allen, Rajon Rondo and coach Rivers represented the Eastern Conference in the 2011 NBA All-Star Game in Los Angeles.

== Key dates ==
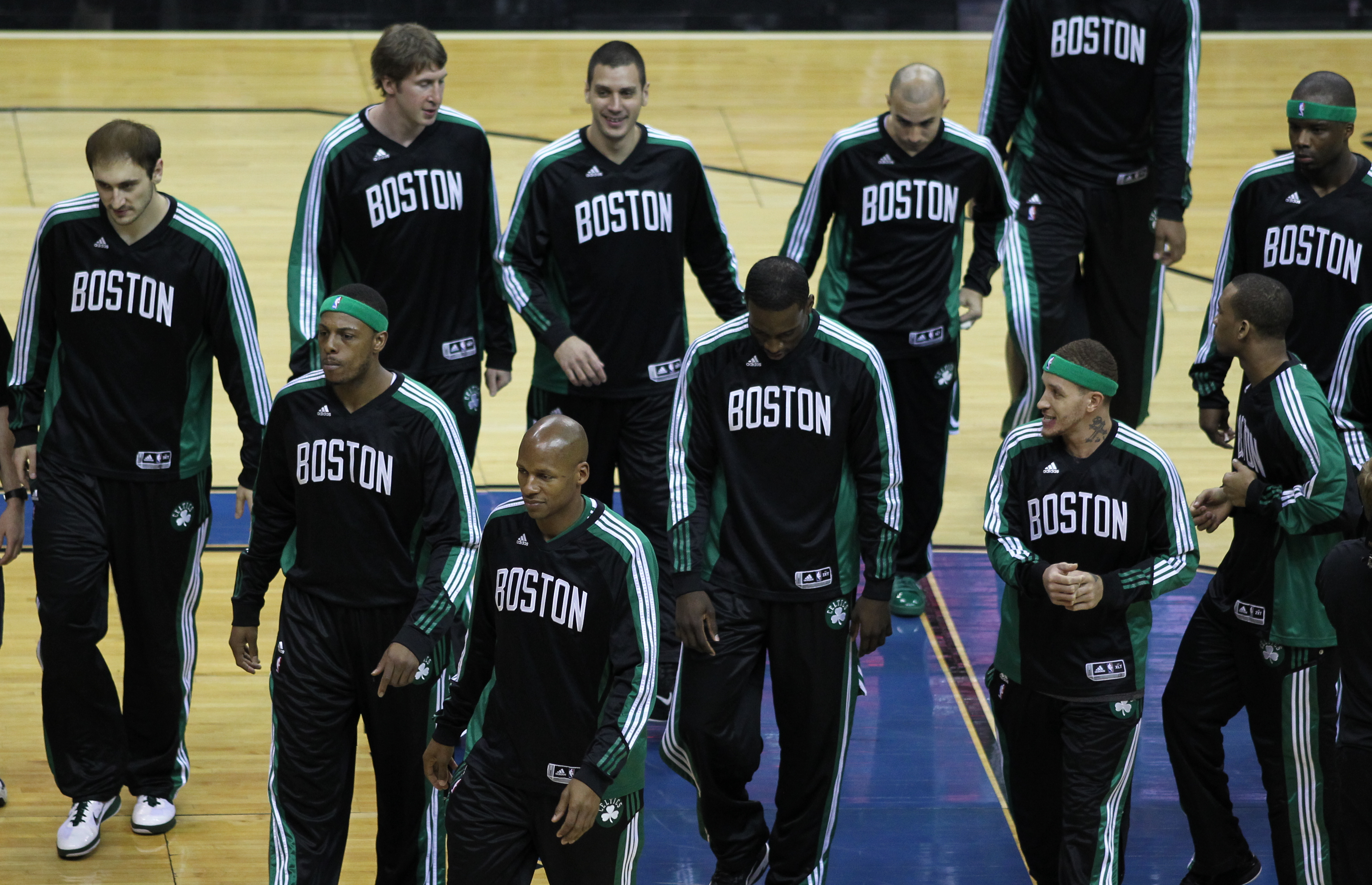
Boston Celtics on April 11, 2011

- June 24 – The 2010 NBA draft was held in New York City.
- July 1 – The free agency period started.
- October 26 – The regular season started with an 88–80 win over the media-hyped Miami Heat.

== Draft picks ==
| Round | Pick | Player | Position | Nationality | College/Team |
|---|---|---|---|---|---|
| 1 | 19 | Avery Bradley | SG | United States | Texas |
| 2 | 52 | Luke Harangody | PF | United States | Notre Dame |

== Roster ==
2010–11 Boston Celtics roster
Players

| Pos. | No. | Player | Height | Weight | DOB | From |
|---|---|---|---|---|---|---|
| SG | 20 | Ray Allen | 6 ft 5 in (1.96 m) | 205 lb (93 kg) | 1975-07-20 | Connecticut |
| PG | 45 | Carlos Arroyo | 6 ft 2 in (1.88 m) | 200 lb (91 kg) | 1979-07-30 | FIU |
| PG | 0 | Avery Bradley | 6 ft 2 in (1.88 m) | 180 lb (82 kg) | 1990-11-26 | Texas |
| F/C | 11 | Glen Davis | 6 ft 9 in (2.06 m) | 289 lb (131 kg) | 1986-01-01 | LSU |
| PF | 5 | Kevin Garnett | 6 ft 11 in (2.11 m) | 255 lb (116 kg) | 1976-05-19 | Farragut Academy (IL) |
| SF | 8 | Jeff Green | 6 ft 9 in (2.06 m) | 235 lb (107 kg) | 1986-08-28 | Georgetown |
| C | 4 | Nenad Krstić | 7 ft 0 in (2.13 m) | 240 lb (109 kg) | 1983-07-23 | Serbia |
| PF | 30 | Troy Murphy | 6 ft 11 in (2.11 m) | 245 lb (111 kg) | 1980-05-02 | Notre Dame |
| PF | 7 | Jermaine O'Neal | 6 ft 11 in (2.11 m) | 255 lb (116 kg) | 1978-10-13 | Eau Claire HS (SC) |
| C | 36 | Shaquille O'Neal | 7 ft 1 in (2.16 m) | 325 lb (147 kg) | 1972-03-06 | LSU |
| SF | 77 | Sasha Pavlović | 6 ft 7 in (2.01 m) | 235 lb (107 kg) | 1983-11-15 | Yugoslavia |
| SF | 34 | Paul Pierce | 6 ft 7 in (2.01 m) | 235 lb (107 kg) | 1977-10-13 | Kansas |
| PG | 9 | Rajon Rondo | 6 ft 1 in (1.85 m) | 171 lb (78 kg) | 1986-02-22 | Kentucky |
| SG | 12 | Von Wafer | 6 ft 5 in (1.96 m) | 209 lb (95 kg) | 1985-07-21 | Florida State |
| PG | 13 | Delonte West | 6 ft 3 in (1.91 m) | 180 lb (82 kg) | 1983-07-26 | Saint Joseph's |

Coaches
Head coach
- Doc Rivers
Assistant(s)
- Kevin Eastman
- Lawrence Frank
- Armond Hill
- Roy Rogers
- Mike Longabardi

Legend
- (DP) Unsigned draft pick
- (FA) Free agent
- (S) Suspended
- Injured

Roster
Updated: March 6, 2011

== Pre-season ==
=== Game log ===
2010 pre-season game log
Pre-season: 7–1 (home: 4–0; road: 3–1)

| Game | Date | Team | Score | High points | High rebounds | High assists | Location Attendance | Record |
|---|---|---|---|---|---|---|---|---|
| 1 | October 6 | Philadelphia | W 93–65 | Ray Allen (14) | Ray Allen (8) | Rajon Rondo (7) | Verizon Wireless Arena; 10,038 | 1–0 |
| 2 | October 7 | @ New Jersey | W 96–92 | Glen Davis (20) | Paul Pierce, Delonte West (6) | Rajon Rondo (7) | Prudential Center; 8,483 | 2–0 |
| 3 | October 10 | Toronto | W 91–87 | Nate Robinson (13) | Kevin Garnett (6) | Rajon Rondo (7) | TD Garden; 18,624 | 3–0 |
| 4 | October 12 | @ Philadelphia | L 92–103 | Nate Robinson (26) | Jermaine O'Neal (12) | Nate Robinson (8) | Wells Fargo Center; 7,835 | 3–1 |
| 5 | October 13 | @ New York | W 104–101 | Ray Allen (24) | Kevin Garnett (9) | Rajon Rondo (7) | Madison Square Garden; 19,763 | 4–1 |
| 6 | October 15 | @ Toronto | W 117–112 | Nate Robinson (23) | Semih Erden (8) | Rajon Rondo (5) | Air Canada Centre; 13,763 | 5–1 |
| 7 | October 16 | New York | W 97–84 | Kevin Garnett (20) | Rajon Rondo (8) | Rajon Rondo (9) | XL Center; 15,318 | 6–1 |
| 8 | October 20 | New Jersey | W 107–92 | Paul Pierce (17) | Shaquille O'Neal (9) | Rajon Rondo (12) | TD Garden; 18,624 | 7–1 |

2010–11 season schedule

== Regular season ==
=== Standings ===
| Atlantic Division | W | L | PCT | GB | Home | Road | Div |
|---|---|---|---|---|---|---|---|
| y-Boston Celtics | 56 | 26 | .683 | – | 33–8 | 23–18 | 13–3 |
| x-New York Knicks | 42 | 40 | .512 | 14 | 23–18 | 19–22 | 10–6 |
| x-Philadelphia 76ers | 41 | 41 | .500 | 15 | 26–15 | 15–26 | 9–7 |
| New Jersey Nets | 24 | 58 | .293 | 32 | 19–22 | 5–36 | 3–13 |
| Toronto Raptors | 22 | 60 | .268 | 34 | 16–25 | 6–35 | 5–11 |

| # | Eastern Conference | | | | |
| # | Team | W | L | PCT | GB |
|---|---|---|---|---|---|
| 1 | z-Chicago Bulls | 62 | 20 | .756 | – |
| 2 | y-Miami Heat | 58 | 24 | .707 | 4 |
| 3 | y-Boston Celtics | 56 | 26 | .683 | 6 |
| 4 | x-Orlando Magic | 52 | 30 | .634 | 10 |
| 5 | x-Atlanta Hawks | 44 | 38 | .537 | 18 |
| 6 | x-New York Knicks | 42 | 40 | .512 | 20 |
| 7 | x-Philadelphia 76ers | 41 | 41 | .500 | 21 |
| 8 | x-Indiana Pacers | 37 | 45 | .451 | 25 |
| 9 | Milwaukee Bucks | 35 | 47 | .427 | 27 |
| 10 | Charlotte Bobcats | 34 | 48 | .415 | 28 |
| 11 | Detroit Pistons | 30 | 52 | .366 | 32 |
| 12 | New Jersey Nets | 24 | 58 | .293 | 38 |
| 13 | Washington Wizards | 23 | 59 | .280 | 39 |
| 14 | Toronto Raptors | 22 | 60 | .268 | 40 |
| 15 | Cleveland Cavaliers | 19 | 63 | .232 | 43 |

=== Game log ===
2010–11 game log
Total: 56–26 (home: 33–8; road: 23–18)
October: 2–1 (home: 2–0; road: 0–1)

| Game | Date | Team | Score | High points | High rebounds | High assists | Location Attendance | Record |
|---|---|---|---|---|---|---|---|---|
| 1 | October 26 | Miami | W 88–80 | Ray Allen (20) | Kevin Garnett (10) | Rajon Rondo (17) | TD Garden; 18,624 | 1–0 |
| 2 | October 27 | @ Cleveland | L 87–95 | Rajon Rondo (18) | Kevin Garnett (15) | Rajon Rondo (9) | Quicken Loans Arena; 20,562 | 1–1 |
| 3 | October 29 | New York | W 105–101 | Paul Pierce (25) | Paul Pierce (14) | Rajon Rondo (24) | TD Garden; 18,624 | 2–1 |

November : 11–3 (home: 5–1; road: 6–2)

| Game | Date | Team | Score | High points | High rebounds | High assists | Location Attendance | Record |
|---|---|---|---|---|---|---|---|---|
| 4 | November 2 | @ Detroit | W 109–86 | Kevin Garnett (22) | Kevin Garnett (6) | Rajon Rondo (17) | The Palace of Auburn Hills; 15,313 | 3–1 |
| 5 | November 3 | Milwaukee | W 105–102 (OT) | Paul Pierce (28) | Rajon Rondo, Kevin Garnett (8) | Rajon Rondo (15) | TD Garden; 18,624 | 4–1 |
| 6 | November 5 | Chicago | W 110–105 (OT) | Ray Allen (25) | Kevin Garnett (10) | Rajon Rondo (11) | TD Garden; 18,624 | 5–1 |
| 7 | November 7 | @ Oklahoma City | W 92–83 | Ray Allen (19) | Jermaine O'Neal (9) | Rajon Rondo (10) | Oklahoma City Arena; 18,203 | 6–1 |
| 8 | November 8 | @ Dallas | L 87–89 | Paul Pierce (24) | Kevin Garnett (15) | Rajon Rondo (15) | American Airlines Center; 20,194 | 6–2 |
| 9 | November 11 | @ Miami | W 112–107 | Ray Allen (35) | Kevin Garnett (13) | Rajon Rondo (16) | American Airlines Arena; 19,650 | 7–2 |
| 10 | November 13 | @ Memphis | W 116–110 (OT) | Paul Pierce (28) | Kevin Garnett (9) | Rajon Rondo (17) | FedExForum; 18,119 | 8–2 |
| 11 | November 17 | Washington | W 114–83 | Paul Pierce (23) | Glen Davis (8) | Rajon Rondo (13) | TD Garden; 18,624 | 9–2 |
| 12 | November 19 | Oklahoma City | L 84–89 | Kevin Garnett (16) | Shaquille O'Neal, Paul Pierce (6) | Rajon Rondo (7) | TD Garden; 18,624 | 9–3 |
| 13 | November 21 | @ Toronto | L 101–102 | Nate Robinson (22) | Kevin Garnett, Ray Allen (8) | Paul Pierce (5) | Air Canada Centre; 17,707 | 9–4 |
| 14 | November 22 | @ Atlanta | W 99–76 | Kevin Garnett (17) | Kevin Garnett, Shaquille O'Neal (11) | Nate Robinson (10) | Philips Arena; 14,476 | 10–4 |
| 15 | November 24 | New Jersey | W 89–83 | Shaquille O'Neal (25) | Shaquille O'Neal (11) | Ray Allen (7) | TD Garden; 18,624 | 11–4 |
| 16 | November 26 | Toronto | W 110–101 | Kevin Garnett (26) | Kevin Garnett (11) | Rajon Rondo (14) | TD Garden; 18,624 | 12–4 |
| 17 | November 30 | @ Cleveland | W 106–87 | Rajon Rondo (23) | Glen Davis (11) | Rajon Rondo (12) | Quicken Loans Arena; 20,562 | 13–4 |

December: 11–3 (home: 6–1; road: 5–2)

| Game | Date | Team | Score | High points | High rebounds | High assists | Location Attendance | Record |
|---|---|---|---|---|---|---|---|---|
| 18 | December 1 | Portland | W 99–95 | Paul Pierce (28) | Kevin Garnett (8) | Rajon Rondo (10) | TD Garden; 18,624 | 14–4 |
| 19 | December 3 | Chicago | W 104–92 | Kevin Garnett (20) | Kevin Garnett (17) | Rajon Rondo (19) | TD Garden; 18,624 | 15–4 |
| 20 | December 5 | @ New Jersey | W 100–75 | Nate Robinson (21) | Kevin Garnett (14) | Nate Robinson (6) | Prudential Center; 16,196 | 16–4 |
| 21 | December 8 | Denver | W 105–89 | Ray Allen (28) | Kevin Garnett (9) | Rajon Rondo (13) | TD Garden; 18,624 | 17–4 |
| 22 | December 9 | @ Philadelphia | W 102–101 | Ray Allen (23) | Paul Pierce (8) | Rajon Rondo (14) | Wells Fargo Center; 17,948 | 18–4 |
| 23 | December 11 | @ Charlotte | W 93–62 | Ray Allen, Glen Davis (16) | Kevin Garnett (11) | Rajon Rondo (8) | Time Warner Cable Arena; 19,603 | 19–4 |
| 24 | December 15 | @ New York | W 118–116 | Paul Pierce (32) | Kevin Garnett (13) | Rajon Rondo (14) | Madison Square Garden; 19,763 | 20–4 |
| 25 | December 16 | Atlanta | W 102–90 | Ray Allen, Glen Davis (18) | Kevin Garnett (14) | Paul Pierce (10) | TD Garden; 18,624 | 21–4 |
| 26 | December 19 | Indiana | W 99–88 | Glen Davis, Paul Pierce, Nate Robinson (18) | Paul Pierce (10) | Paul Pierce (12) | TD Garden; 18,624 | 22–4 |
| 27 | December 22 | Philadelphia | W 84–80 | Ray Allen (22) | Shaquille O'Neal (9) | Ray Allen (6) | TD Garden; 18,624 | 23–4 |
| 28 | December 25 | @ Orlando | L 78–86 | Kevin Garnett (22) | Glen Davis, Paul Pierce (8) | Paul Pierce (5) | Amway Center; 19,013 | 23–5 |
| 29 | December 28 | @ Indiana | W 95–83 | Paul Pierce (21) | Kevin Garnett (13) | Paul Pierce (7) | Conseco Fieldhouse; 18,165 | 24–5 |
| 30 | December 29 | @ Detroit | L 92–104 | Paul Pierce (33) | Ray Allen (7) | Paul Pierce (8) | The Palace of Auburn Hills; 22,076 | 24–6 |
| 31 | December 31 | New Orleans | L 81–83 | Ray Allen (18) | Paul Pierce (7) | Ray Allen, Marquis Daniels (4) | TD Garden; 18,624 | 24–7 |

January: 12–4 (home: 9–1; road: 3–3)

| Game | Date | Team | Score | High points | High rebounds | High assists | Location Attendance | Record |
|---|---|---|---|---|---|---|---|---|
| 32 | January 2 | @ Toronto | W 93–79 | Paul Pierce (30) | Glen Davis (11) | Glen Davis, Rajon Rondo (8) | Air Canada Centre; 19,986 | 25–7 |
| 33 | January 3 | Minnesota | W 96–93 | Paul Pierce (23) | Paul Pierce, Von Wafer (6) | Rajon Rondo (16) | TD Garden; 18,624 | 26–7 |
| 34 | January 5 | San Antonio | W 105–103 | Ray Allen (31) | Rajon Rondo (10) | Rajon Rondo (22) | TD Garden; 18,624 | 27–7 |
| 35 | January 7 | Toronto | W 122–102 | Paul Pierce (20) | Luke Harangody (11) | Rajon Rondo (7) | TD Garden; 18,624 | 28–7 |
| 36 | January 8 | @ Chicago | L 79–90 | Paul Pierce (21) | Rajon Rondo (5) | Rajon Rondo (8) | United Center; 22,663 | 28–8 |
| 37 | January 10 | Houston | L 102–108 | Ray Allen, Marquis Daniels (19) | Ray Allen, Marquis Daniels (7) | Rajon Rondo (12) | TD Garden; 18,624 | 28–9 |
| 38 | January 12 | Sacramento | W 119–95 | Paul Pierce (25) | Semih Erden (9) | Rajon Rondo (13) | TD Garden; 18,624 | 29–9 |
| 39 | January 14 | Charlotte | W 99–94 | Shaquille O'Neal (23) | Rajon Rondo (6) | Rajon Rondo (13) | TD Garden; 18,624 | 30–9 |
| 40 | January 17 | Orlando | W 109–106 | Ray Allen (26) | Kevin Garnett (8) | Rajon Rondo (13) | TD Garden; 18,624 | 31–9 |
| 41 | January 19 | Detroit | W 86–82 | Paul Pierce (22) | Shaquille O'Neal (12) | Rajon Rondo (8) | TD Garden; 18,624 | 32–9 |
| 42 | January 21 | Utah | W 110–86 | Kevin Garnett (21) | Glen Davis, Semih Erden (7) | Rajon Rondo (12) | TD Garden; 18,624 | 33–9 |
| 43 | January 22 | @ Washington | L 83–85 | Kevin Garnett (17) | Semih Erden (11) | Rajon Rondo (9) | Verizon Center; 20,278 | 33–10 |
| 44 | January 25 | Cleveland | W 112–95 | Paul Pierce (24) | Semih Erden (8) | Rajon Rondo (10) | TD Garden; 18,624 | 34–10 |
| 45 | January 27 | @ Portland | W 88–78 | Ray Allen (18) | Kevin Garnett, Kendrick Perkins (9) | Kevin Garnett (9) | Rose Garden; 20,706 | 35–10 |
| 46 | January 28 | @ Phoenix | L 71–88 | Kevin Garnett (18) | Kevin Garnett (9) | Rajon Rondo (6) | US Airways Center; 18,422 | 35–11 |
| 47 | January 30 | @ L.A. Lakers | W 109–96 | Paul Pierce (32) | Kevin Garnett (13) | Rajon Rondo (16) | Staples Center; 18,997 | 36–11 |

February: 7–4 (home: 3–2; road: 4–2)

| Game | Date | Team | Score | High points | High rebounds | High assists | Location Attendance | Record |
|---|---|---|---|---|---|---|---|---|
| 48 | February 1 | @ Sacramento | W 95–90 | Ray Allen (22) | Kendrick Perkins (10) | Rajon Rondo (10) | ARCO Arena; 16,482 | 37–11 |
| 49 | February 4 | Dallas | L 97–101 | Ray Allen (24) | Kendrick Perkins (12) | Rajon Rondo (12) | TD Garden; 18,624 | 37–12 |
| 50 | February 6 | Orlando | W 91–80 | Rajon Rondo (26) | Kendrick Perkins (13) | Rajon Rondo (7) | TD Garden; 18,624 | 38–12 |
| 51 | February 7 | @ Charlotte | L 89–94 | Ray Allen (25) | Kevin Garnett (14) | Rajon Rondo (14) | Time Warner Cable Arena; 19,081 | 38–13 |
| 52 | February 10 | L.A. Lakers | L 86–92 | Ray Allen (20) | Kevin Garnett (11) | Rajon Rondo (10) | TD Garden; 18,624 | 38–14 |
| 53 | February 13 | Miami | W 85–82 | Kevin Garnett (19) | Rajon Rondo (10) | Rajon Rondo (10) | TD Garden; 18,624 | 39–14 |
| 54 | February 16 | New Jersey | W 94–80 | Paul Pierce (31) | Kevin Garnett (10) | Rajon Rondo (8) | TD Garden; 18,624 | 40–14 |
All-Star Break
| 55 | February 22 | @ Golden State | W 115–93 | Kevin Garnett (24) | Kevin Garnett (12) | Rajon Rondo (15) | Oracle Arena; 19,738 | 41–14 |
| 56 | February 24 | @ Denver | L 75–89 | Paul Pierce (17) | Kevin Garnett (13) | Rajon Rondo (8) | Pepsi Center; 18,524 | 41–15 |
| 57 | February 26 | @ L.A. Clippers | W 99–92 | Paul Pierce (24) | Kevin Garnett (11) | Rajon Rondo (11) | Staples Center; 19,513 | 42–15 |
| 58 | February 28 | @ Utah | W 107–102 | Ray Allen (25) | Kevin Garnett (14) | Rajon Rondo (11) | EnergySolutions Arena; 19,911 | 43–15 |

March: 9–7 (home: 4–3; road: 5–4)

| Game | Date | Team | Score | High points | High rebounds | High assists | Location Attendance | Record |
|---|---|---|---|---|---|---|---|---|
| 59 | March 2 | Phoenix | W 115–103 | Kevin Garnett (28) | Paul Pierce (13) | Rajon Rondo (15) | TD Garden; 18,624 | 44–15 |
| 60 | March 4 | Golden State | W 107–103 | Ray Allen, Paul Pierce (27) | Paul Pierce (7) | Rajon Rondo (16) | TD Garden; 18,624 | 45–15 |
| 61 | March 6 | @ Milwaukee | W 89–83 | Paul Pierce (23) | Kevin Garnett (11) | Rajon Rondo (8) | Bradley Center; 16,110 | 46–15 |
| 62 | March 9 | L.A. Clippers | L 103–108 | Ray Allen (23) | Nenad Krstić (9) | Rajon Rondo (9) | TD Garden; 18,624 | 46–16 |
| 63 | March 11 | @ Philadelphia | L 86–89 | Jeff Green (18) | Nenad Krstić (15) | Kevin Garnett, Paul Pierce, Rajon Rondo (5) | Wells Fargo Center; 20,614 | 46–17 |
| 64 | March 13 | Milwaukee | W 87–56 | Ray Allen (17) | Nenad Krstić (14) | Carlos Arroyo (6) | TD Garden; 18,624 | 47–17 |
| 65 | March 14 | @ New Jersey | L 79–88 | Ray Allen (19) | Glen Davis (14) | Rajon Rondo (9) | Prudential Center; 18,711 | 47–18 |
| 66 | March 16 | Indiana | W 92–80 | Paul Pierce (20) | Glen Davis (9) | Rajon Rondo (8) | TD Garden; 18,624 | 48–18 |
| 67 | March 18 | @ Houston | L 77–93 | Jeff Green (17) | Glen Davis (7) | Rajon Rondo (6) | Toyota Center; 18,412 | 48–19 |
| 68 | March 19 | @ New Orleans | W 89–85 | Ray Allen, Glen Davis (20) | Kevin Garnett (9) | Paul Pierce (6) | New Orleans Arena; 18,018 | 49–19 |
| 69 | March 21 | @ New York | W 96–86 | Kevin Garnett (24) | Kevin Garnett (11) | Rajon Rondo (12) | Madison Square Garden; 19,763 | 50–19 |
| 70 | March 23 | Memphis | L 87–90 | Paul Pierce (22) | Rajon Rondo (11) | Rajon Rondo (11) | TD Garden; 18,624 | 50–20 |
| 71 | March 25 | Charlotte | L 81–83 | Paul Pierce (18) | Kevin Garnett (9) | Rajon Rondo (5) | TD Garden; 18,624 | 50–21 |
| 72 | March 27 | @ Minnesota | W 85–82 | Paul Pierce (23) | Kevin Garnett (13) | Kevin Garnett, Delonte West (5) | Target Center; 19,178 | 51–21 |
| 73 | March 28 | @ Indiana | L 100–107 | Paul Pierce (23) | Kevin Garnett, Paul Pierce (6) | Rajon Rondo (9) | Conseco Fieldhouse; 15,932 | 51–22 |
| 74 | March 31 | @ San Antonio | W 107–97 | Rajon Rondo (22) | Paul Pierce (11) | Rajon Rondo (14) | AT&T Center; 18,583 | 52–22 |

April: 4–4 (home: 4–0; road: 0–4)

| Game | Date | Team | Score | High points | High rebounds | High assists | Location Attendance | Record |
|---|---|---|---|---|---|---|---|---|
| 75 | April 1 | @ Atlanta | L 83–88 | Paul Pierce (25) | Kevin Garnett, Rajon Rondo (10) | Kevin Garnett, Rajon Rondo, Delonte West (5) | Philips Arena; 19,763 | 52–23 |
| 76 | April 3 | Detroit | W 101–90 | Kevin Garnett (23) | Kevin Garnett (8) | Rajon Rondo (14) | TD Garden; 18,624 | 53–23 |
| 77 | April 5 | Philadelphia | W 99–82 | Paul Pierce (18) | Jeff Green, Paul Pierce (7) | Rajon Rondo (13) | TD Garden; 18,624 | 54–23 |
| 78 | April 7 | @ Chicago | L 81–97 | Paul Pierce (15) | Kevin Garnett (10) | Rajon Rondo (6) | United Center; 23,067 | 54–24 |
| 79 | April 8 | Washington | W 104–88 | Paul Pierce (22) | Paul Pierce (12) | Rajon Rondo (14) | TD Garden; 18,624 | 55–24 |
| 80 | April 10 | @ Miami | L 77–100 | Paul Pierce (24) | Glen Davis (8) | Rajon Rondo (5) | American Airlines Arena; 19,766 | 55–25 |
| 81 | April 11 | @ Washington | L 94–95 (OT) | Glen Davis, Jeff Green (20) | Jeff Green (15) | Delonte West (5) | Verizon Center; 17,787 | 55–26 |
| 82 | April 13 | New York | W 112–102 | Avery Bradley (20) | Glen Davis, Jeff Green (8) | Von Wafer (5) | TD Garden; 18,624 | 56–26 |

2010–11 season schedule

== Playoffs ==
=== Game log ===
2011 playoff game log
First Round: 4–0 (home: 2–0; road: 2–0)

| Game | Date | Team | Score | High points | High rebounds | High assists | Location Attendance | Series |
|---|---|---|---|---|---|---|---|---|
| 1 | April 17 | New York | W 87–85 | Ray Allen (24) | Kevin Garnett (13) | Rajon Rondo (9) | TD Garden; 18,624 | 1–0 |
| 2 | April 19 | New York | W 96–93 | Rajon Rondo (30) | Kevin Garnett (10) | Rajon Rondo (7) | TD Garden; 18,624 | 2–0 |
| 3 | April 22 | @ New York | W 113–96 | Paul Pierce (38) | Kevin Garnett (12) | Rajon Rondo (20) | Madison Square Garden; 19,763 | 3–0 |
| 4 | April 24 | @ New York | W 101–89 | Kevin Garnett (24) | Kevin Garnett (9) | Rajon Rondo (12) | Madison Square Garden; 19,763 | 4–0 |

Conference Semifinals: 1–4 (home: 1–1; road: 0–3)

| Game | Date | Team | Score | High points | High rebounds | High assists | Location Attendance | Series |
|---|---|---|---|---|---|---|---|---|
| 1 | May 1 | @ Miami | L 90–99 | Ray Allen (25) | Kevin Garnett (8) | Rajon Rondo (7) | American Airlines Arena; 20,021 | 0–1 |
| 2 | May 3 | @ Miami | L 91–102 | Rajon Rondo (20) | Jermaine O'Neal (9) | Rajon Rondo (12) | American Airlines Arena; 20,104 | 0–2 |
| 3 | May 7 | Miami | W 97–81 | Kevin Garnett (28) | Kevin Garnett (18) | Rajon Rondo (11) | TD Garden; 18,624 | 1–2 |
| 4 | May 9 | Miami | L 90–98 (OT) | Paul Pierce (27) | Kevin Garnett (10) | Rajon Rondo (5) | TD Garden; 18,624 | 1–3 |
| 5 | May 11 | @ Miami | L 87–97 | Ray Allen (18) | Kevin Garnett (11) | Paul Pierce (4) | American Airlines Arena; 20,208 | 1–4 |

2011 playoff schedule

== Player statistics ==
Legend
| GP | Games played | GS | Games started | MPG | Minutes per game |
| FG% | Field-goal percentage | 3P% | 3-point field-goal percentage | FT% | Free-throw percentage |
| RPG | Rebounds per game | APG | Assists per game | SPG | Steals per game |
| BPG | Blocks per game | PPG | Points per game |

=== Season ===
Boston Celtics statistics
| Player | GP | GS | MPG | FG% | 3P% | FT% | RPG | APG | SPG | BPG | PPG |
|---|---|---|---|---|---|---|---|---|---|---|---|
| Ray Allen | 80 | 80 | 36.1 | .491 | .444 | .881 | 3.4 | 2.7 | 1.0 | .2 | 16.5 |
| Carlos Arroyo* | 15 | 1 | 12.7 | .314 | .600 | .917 | 1.5 | 1.7 | .5 | .0 | 2.4 |
| Avery Bradley | 31 | 0 | 5.2 | .343 | .000 | .500 | .5 | .4 | .3 | .0 | 1.7 |
| Marquis Daniels* | 49 | 0 | 19.1 | .491 | .190 | .684 | 2.3 | 1.3 | .8 | .4 | 5.5 |
| Glen Davis | 78 | 13 | 29.5 | .448 | .133 | .736 | 5.4 | 1.2 | 1.0 | .4 | 11.7 |
| Semih Erden* | 36 | 7 | 14.3 | .604 | .000 | .630 | 2.9 | 0.5 | 0.4 | 0.6 | 4.2 |
| Kevin Garnett | 71 | 71 | 31.3 | .528 | .200 | .862 | 8.9 | 2.4 | 1.3 | .8 | 14.9 |
| Jeff Green | 26 | 2 | 23.4 | .485 | .296 | .794 | 3.3 | .7 | .5 | .6 | 9.8 |
| Luke Harangody* | 16 | 0 | 19.1 | .413 | .244 | .778 | 4.3 | .8 | .6 | .6 | 6.9 |
| Chris Johnson* | 4 | 0 | 8.0 | .667 | .000 | 1.000 | 1.3 | .3 | .0 | .8 | 1.5 |
| Nenad Krstić* | 24 | 20 | 23.0 | .537 | .000 | .750 | 5.3 | .3 | .3 | .3 | 9.1 |
| Troy Murphy* | 17 | 0 | 10.5 | .421 | .100 | .846 | 2.2 | .4 | .5 | .1 | 2.6 |
| Jermaine O'Neal | 24 | 10 | 18.0 | .459 | .000 | .674 | 3.7 | .5 | .1 | 1.2 | 5.4 |
| Shaquille O'Neal | 37 | 36 | 20.3 | .667 | .000 | .557 | 4.8 | 0.7 | .4 | 1.1 | 9.2 |
| Sasha Pavlović* | 17 | 0 | 8.8 | .462 | .500 | .400 | .8 | .2 | .3 | .0 | 1.8 |
| Kendrick Perkins* | 12 | 7 | 26.1 | .542 | .000 | .575 | 8.1 | .8 | .2 | .8 | 7.3 |
| Paul Pierce | 80 | 80 | 34.7 | .497 | .374 | .860 | 5.4 | 3.3 | 1.0 | .6 | 18.9 |
| Nate Robinson* | 55 | 11 | 17.9 | .404 | .328 | .825 | 1.6 | 1.9 | .5 | .1 | 7.1 |
| Rajon Rondo | 68 | 68 | 37.2 | .475 | .233 | .568 | 4.4 | 11.2 | 2.2 | .2 | 10.6 |
| Von Wafer | 58 | 2 | 9.5 | .421 | .269 | .842 | .8 | .6 | .3 | .1 | 3.2 |
| Delonte West | 24 | 2 | 18.9 | .458 | .364 | .867 | 1.5 | 2.7 | 0.8 | .4 | 5.6 |

* – Stats with the Celtics.

== Awards, records and milestones ==
=== Awards ===
==== Week/Month ====
- On November 1, 2010 Rajon Rondo was named Eastern Conference's Player of the Week (October 26–31).
- On December 1, 2010 Doc Rivers was named Eastern Conference's Coach of the Month (November).
- On December 20, 2010 Paul Pierce was named Eastern Conference's Player of the Week (December 13–19).

==== All-Star ====
- Doc Rivers and his staff earned the right to coach the Eastern Conference team in the All-Star Game.
- Rajon Rondo was selected to his 2nd All-Star Game.
- Ray Allen was selected to his 10th All-Star Game.
- Paul Pierce was selected to his 9th All-Star Game.
- Kevin Garnett was selected to his 14th All-Star Game.

=== Milestones ===
- Paul Pierce becomes the 3rd Celtics player in history to score 20,000 points joining Larry Bird and John Havlicek.
- On January 8, 2011, Boston Celtics joined Los Angeles Lakers to be the only franchises to reach 3,000 wins. They won against Toronto Raptors, 122–102.
- On February 10, 2011, Ray Allen became the NBA's all-time leader in three-point field goals, surpassing Reggie Miller with 2,561.

== Transactions ==
=== Overview ===
Boston Celtics

Players Added

Via Draft

- Avery Bradley
- Luke Harangody

Via Free Agency

- Jermaine O'Neal (From Miami)
- Von Wafer (From Dallas)
- Shaquille O'Neal (From Cleveland)
- Delonte West (From Cleveland)
- Troy Murphy (From New Jersey)
- Sasha Pavlović (From New Orleans)
- Carlos Arroyo (From Miami)

Via Trade

- Jeff Green (From Oklahoma City)
- Nenad Krstić (From Oklahoma City)
Players Lost

Via Free Agency

- Tony Allen (To Memphis)
- Shelden Williams (To Denver)
- Brian Scalabrine (To Chicago)

Via Trade

- Kendrick Perkins (To Oklahoma City)
- Nate Robinson (To Oklahoma City)
- Semih Erden (To Cleveland)
- Luke Harangody (To Cleveland)
- Marquis Daniels (To Sacramento)

Waived

- Rasheed Wallace
- Oliver Lafayette
- Tony Gaffney

=== Trades ===
February 24, 2011

To Boston Celtics

- (United States) Jeff Green
- (Serbia) Nenad Krstić
- 2012 first-round pick (top-10 protected)
To Oklahoma City Thunder

- (United States) Kendrick Perkins
- (United States) Nate Robinson
February 24, 2011

To Boston Celtics

- 2013 second-round pick
To Cleveland Cavaliers

- (Turkey) Semih Erden
- (United States) Luke Harangody
February 24, 2011

To Boston Celtics

- 2017 second-round pick
To Sacramento Kings

- (United States) Marquis Daniels
- Cash considerations

=== Free agents ===
==== Additions ====
| Player | Signed | Former Team |
|---|---|---|
| Semih Erden | Signed 1-year contract | Fenerbahçe Ülker |
| Avery Bradley | Undisclosed terms | Boston Celtics |
| Paul Pierce | Signed 4-year contract for $61 Million | Boston Celtics |
| Ray Allen | Signed 2-year contract for $20 Million | Boston Celtics |
| Jermaine O'Neal | Signed 2-year contract for $11.6 Million | Miami Heat |
| Nate Robinson | Signed 2-year contract for $8 Million | New York Knicks |
| Marquis Daniels | Signed 1-year contract for $2.5 Million | Indiana Pacers |
| Carlos Arroyo | Undisclosed terms | Miami Heat |
| Shaquille O'Neal | Signed 2-year contract | Cleveland Cavaliers |
| Luke Harangody | Signed 2-year contract | San Antonio Spurs |
| Delonte West | Undisclosed terms | Cleveland Cavaliers |
| Chris Johnson | Signed 10-day contract | Portland Trail Blazers |
| Troy Murphy | Undisclosed | New Jersey Nets |

==== Subtractions ====
| Player | Reason Left | New Team |
|---|---|---|
| Tony Allen | Free agent | Memphis Grizzlies |
| Shelden Williams | Free agent | Denver Nuggets |
| Rasheed Wallace | Waived | New York Knicks |
| Brian Scalabrine | Free agent | Chicago Bulls |
| Tony Gaffney | Waived | Türk Telekom B.K. |

== See also ==
- 2010–11 NBA season
