= Rajon Rondo =

American basketball player (born 1986)

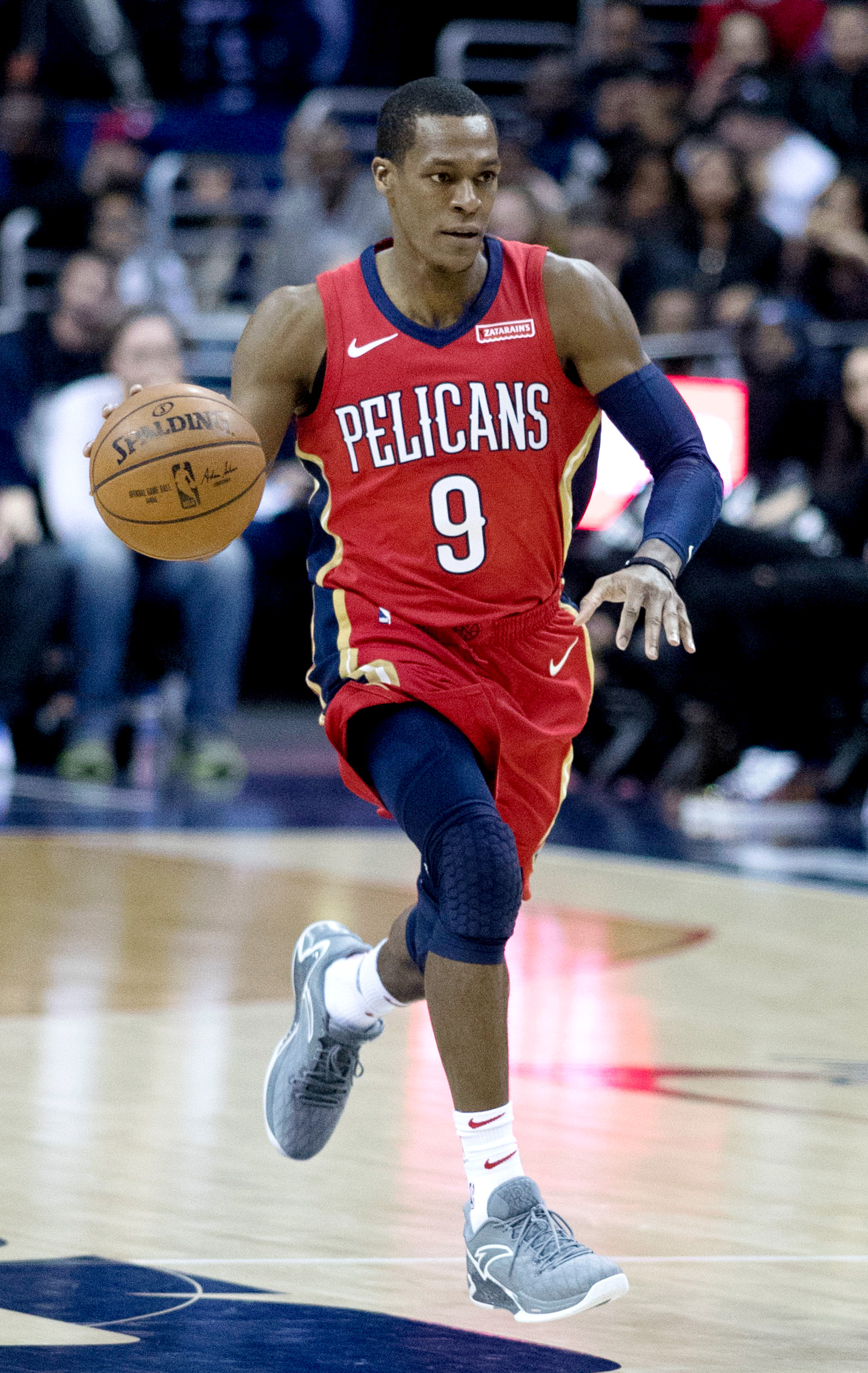
- Rondo with the New Orleans Pelicans in 2017

Personal information
- Born: February 22, 1986 (age 40) Louisville, Kentucky, U.S.
- Listed height: 6 ft 1 in (1.85 m)
- Listed weight: 180 lb (82 kg)

Career information
- High school: Eastern (Middletown, Kentucky); Oak Hill Academy (Mouth of Wilson, Virginia)
- College: Kentucky (2004–2006)
- NBA draft: 2006: 1st round, 21st overall pick
- Drafted by: Phoenix Suns
- Playing career: 2006–2022
- Position: Point guard
- Number: 9, 7, 4, 1

Career history
- 2006–2014: Boston Celtics
- 2014–2015: Dallas Mavericks
- 2015–2016: Sacramento Kings
- 2016–2017: Chicago Bulls
- 2017–2018: New Orleans Pelicans
- 2018–2020: Los Angeles Lakers
- 2020–2021: Atlanta Hawks
- 2021: Los Angeles Clippers
- 2021–2022: Los Angeles Lakers
- 2022: Cleveland Cavaliers

Career highlights
- 2× NBA champion (2008, 2020); 4× NBA All-Star (2010–2013); All-NBA Third Team (2012); 2× NBA All-Defensive First Team (2010, 2011); 2× NBA All-Defensive Second Team (2009, 2012); 3× NBA assists leader (2012, 2013, 2016); NBA steals leader (2010); NBA All-Rookie Second Team (2007); SEC All-Freshman Team (2005); Second-team Parade All-American (2004); McDonald's All-American (2004)

Career NBA statistics
- Points: 9,337 (9.8 ppg)
- Rebounds: 4,349 (4.5 rpg)
- Assists: 7,584 (7.9 apg)
- Stats at NBA.com
- Stats at Basketball Reference

Rajon Pierre Rondo Sr. (/ˈrɑːʒɒn/; born February 22, 1986) is an American former professional basketball player. Rondo won two NBA championships, was selected four times as an NBA All-Star, earned four NBA All-Defensive Team honors including two First Team honors, and was named to the All-NBA Third Team in 2012.

Rondo played two years of college basketball for the Kentucky Wildcats before being drafted 21st overall by the Phoenix Suns in the 2006 NBA draft and immediately traded to the Boston Celtics. As the team's starting point guard, Rondo helped the Celtics win the NBA Finals in 2008 and return in 2010. Rondo was a versatile facilitator, leading the league in assists three times and in steals once; he ranks fourth in Celtics history in assists and third in steals. Rondo has been described as a "stat-sheet stuffer" as his 32 regular season triple-doubles rank 16th in NBA history, while his 10 in the playoffs rank sixth. He is regarded as one of the Celtics' greatest point guards ever.

After 8 1/2 seasons with the Celtics, Rondo was traded to the Dallas Mavericks in December 2014. After a tumultuous five-month stint he turned into a journeyman, joining the Sacramento Kings, Chicago Bulls, New Orleans Pelicans, Los Angeles Lakers (two stints), Atlanta Hawks, Los Angeles Clippers, and Cleveland Cavaliers over the next 7 1/2 years. He won a second championship in 2020 with the Lakers.

== Early life ==
Rondo was born on February 22, 1986, in Louisville, Kentucky. He has three siblings. He had little contact with his father, who left his family when he was seven years old. To support the family, his mother worked the third shift at Philip Morris USA, a tobacco company. Rondo was first interested in football, before his mother steered him towards basketball because she felt that the sport would be less punishing on his skinny frame.

After Rondo became serious about basketball, he attended Louisville's Eastern High School for three years. During his junior year at Eastern High School, he averaged 27.9 points, 10.0 rebounds and 7.5 assists which earned him a spot on the All-State honors and was named the 7th Region Player of the Year. He transferred to Virginia's Oak Hill Academy for his senior year where he averaged 21.0 points per game (ppg), 3.0 rebounds per game (rpg) and 12.0 assists per game (apg) and finished the 2003–04 season with a 38–0 record. In his senior year at Oak Hill Academy, Rondo broke Jeff McInnis's single-season school record of 303 assists, while averaging a double-double. There, he included two efforts of 27 assists and a single-game school record of 31, merely four away from the all-time national record. He also had a 55-point game in high-school, second highest all-time in Oak Hill Academy, surpassed only by Calvin Duncan with 61. Rondo was named to the McDonald's All-American Team in 2004 and scored a total of 14 points, 4 assists and 4 rebounds in the all-star game. He also participated in the 2004 Jordan Brand Capital Classic game, logging 12 points, 5 assists and 4 steals. Rondo was also named a second-team Parade All-American. He ended his career as Oak Hill Academy's all-time assists leader in a single season with 494 assists, surpassing McInnis.

== College career ==
Rondo committed to Kentucky over hometown Louisville. Rondo, along with All-Americans Joe Crawford and Randolph Morris, gave coach Tubby Smith and Kentucky the top-rated recruiting class for 2004 according to Rivals.com. Rondo led Kentucky to several wins including victories against Louisville, South Carolina and Central Florida, but Kentucky failed to advance to the Final Four of the NCAA tournament in either Rondo's freshman or sophomore seasons. He was named to the SEC All-Freshmen Team. He set a Kentucky record for most steals in single-season, with a total of 87 steals in his freshman year and made at least one steal in every game. He finished his freshman year at Kentucky averaging 8.1 points, 2.9 rebounds, 3.5 assists and 2.6 steals.

In his sophomore year, he had a career-high 12 assists against Ole Miss, despite playing just 23 minutes, and 25 points against Louisville. Rondo also set another Kentucky record for most rebounds in a game by a guard, with 19 rebounds in an early season loss to Iowa. He was not known for being a shooter, however, going 18–66 from the three-point line with a 57.1 percent free throw average. He averaged 11.2 points, 6.1 rebounds, 4.9 assists and 2.1 steals per game in his sophomore year. Rondo was also named to the U.S. men's national under-21 basketball team, which traveled to Argentina for the 2005 FIBA Under-21 World Championship. He averaged 11.0 points and 4.5 assists in the eight-game tournament, garnering much attention from NBA scouts. The U.S. men's national under-21 basketball team won the gold medal at the Global Games held in Texas in late July.

== Professional career ==
=== Boston Celtics (2006–2014) ===
==== 2006 NBA draft ====
Following the 2005–06 NCAA season, Rondo announced he would forgo his final two seasons at Kentucky and enter the NBA draft. Rondo was drafted 21st overall by the Phoenix Suns in the 2006 NBA draft. Phoenix then traded him to the Boston Celtics along with Brian Grant for the Cleveland Cavaliers' first-round draft pick in the 2007 NBA draft and cash considerations. He was the first point guard to be chosen in the draft. Rondo was signed by the Celtics on July 4, 2006.

==== 2006–07 season: Rookie year ====
During his rookie season in the NBA, Rondo played a supporting role and would split time with Sebastian Telfair and Delonte West. Rondo only started in 25 games that season due to his initial backup role to Telfair. He made his NBA regular season debut on November 1, 2006, in a home loss against the New Orleans Hornets. In his rookie season, he lacked on his jump shot which resulted in him slashing to the basket for a teardrop or layup. While coming off the bench, he managed to score a career-high 23 points against the Toronto Raptors, and record his first career double-double in a road losing effort against the Washington Wizards. In his first career start, he matched his career-high against the Los Angeles Clippers, though the line-ups were constantly being shuffled between Telfair and Rondo at the point guard. After officially becoming a starter, he began to receive more playing time (career-high 47 minutes of playing time) that led to an improvement in production (career-high 14 rebounds against the San Antonio Spurs, and a career-high 7 steals against the Indiana Pacers). As the mid-season approached, his numbers began to increase, which earned him an NBA All-Rookie Second Team selection. He finished the season with an average of 6.4 ppg and 3.8 apg, ranking in the top ten in the NBA in steals (128) and also ranking in the top ten among rookies in several other categories, including first in steals, second in assists and sixth in minutes. In the end, however, the Celtics finished the season with a 24–58 win–loss record and failed to qualify for the playoffs.

==== 2007–08 season: First championship ====
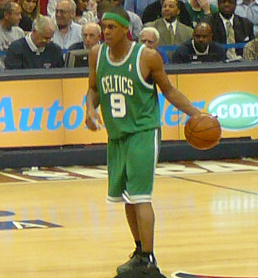
Rondo in May 2008

After Telfair and West were traded during the off-season of the 2007–08 season, Rondo secured a spot in the starting lineup, starting in every game. Surrounded by All-Stars Kevin Garnett, Paul Pierce and Ray Allen, he quickly became a steady, consistent player. In his 77 games played, he averaged 10.6 points per game (ppg), 5.1 assists per game (apg) and 4.2 rebounds per game (rpg). His role as a playmaker reflected in him leading the team in assists and steals. In a game against the New Jersey Nets, Rondo suffered a lower back injury late in the third quarter, forcing him to miss the next four games. He made his successful return from injury and to the starting lineup in a road win against the New York Knicks. A week later, he matched his career-high against the Miami Heat, and then scored a career-high 24 points in a home game against the Los Angeles Clippers the following month. During the All-Star break, he was selected to play on the Sophomore Team in the T-Mobile Rookie Challenge and Youth Jam. Following the All-Star weekend, Rondo recorded a career-high 16 assists in a home victory against the Charlotte Bobcats. Despite his solid rookie year, there was much speculation about Boston needing a veteran point guard. In March, they signed veteran point guard Sam Cassell as a free agent to serve as a backup. The Celtics' best single-season improvement in NBA history earned them the number one seed in the Eastern Conference Playoffs.

Following the regular season, Rondo finished in the top five for the NBA Most Improved Player voting. Rondo made his playoff debut on April 20, 2008, against the Atlanta Hawks and finished the game with 15 points, 9 assists and 2 steals. The Celtics closed out the series in seven games, went on to defeat Cleveland in the next round, and then beat the Pistons in the Eastern Conference finals. In the NBA Finals, facing the Los Angeles Lakers, Rondo recorded two strong performances, including a career-high 16 assists in game 2. In game 3, however, Rondo left the court in the third quarter after rolling his ankle. The ankle injury was considered a "non-factor," and Rondo eventually made his return in game 4. In game 6, the point guard posted a playoffs career-high six steals as the Celtics defeated the Lakers 4–2, giving Rondo his first NBA championship ring. After the game Lakers head coach Phil Jackson called Rondo the "star" of game 6.

==== 2008–09 season: Breakthrough ====
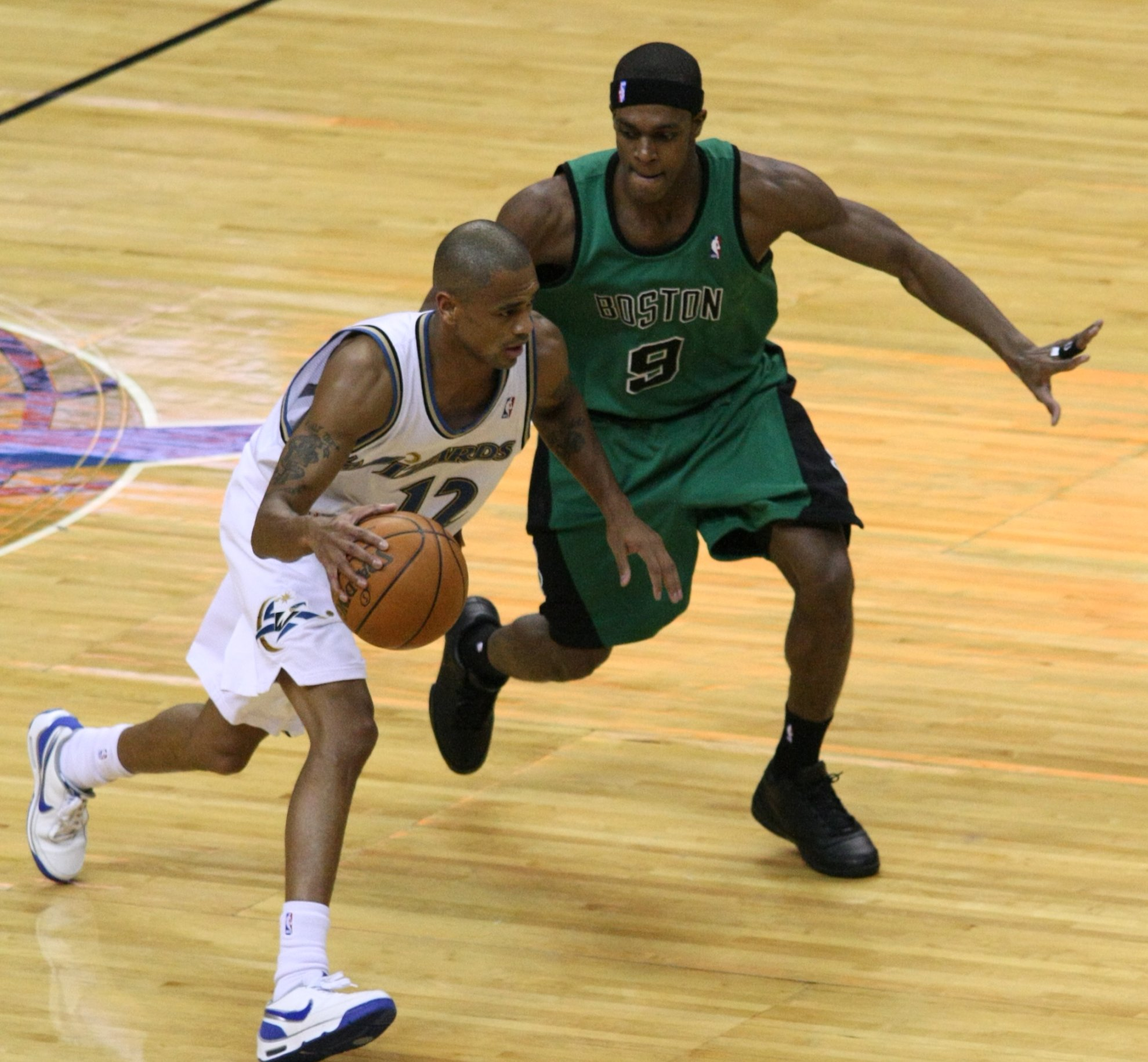
Rondo guarding Juan Dixon in December 2008

In his third NBA campaign, the Celtics began the season with the best starting record in NBA history and also set a franchise record with a nineteen-game winning streak. Rondo's numbers increased from his previous season performance; however, he was criticized for his shooting. He recorded his first career triple-double along with a career-high in assists (16 points, 13 rebounds and 17 assists), against the Indiana Pacers. In a home win against the New York Knicks, Rondo led the team to tie a franchise record with 18 straight wins. However, after the winning streak was snapped, the team struggled as they lost seven out of their next nine games. Rondo—matched up with one of the league's quicker guards, Tony Parker—recorded 16 assists in a losing effort against the Spurs, one short of his season-high. Less than a week later against the Mavericks, he recorded his second career triple-double (19 points, 15 rebounds and 14 assists), and then recorded a career-high 32 points against the Phoenix Suns on his 23rd birthday. He became the first NBA athlete to sign an endorsement contract with Red Bull on April 17, 2009. He finished the season ranking fifth in the NBA in assists (8.2) and steals (1.9). The team finished the season as the second seed in the Eastern Conference, although they entered the playoffs without their injured All-Star power forward Kevin Garnett.

In the playoffs match-up against the Chicago Bulls, despite putting up a playoff career-high 29 points in game 1, the Celtics lost in overtime. Boston won the next two games and in games 2 and 4, Rondo recorded triple-doubles and became the first Celtic player with two triple-doubles in the same series since Larry Bird in 1986. He also became the first player with multiple triple-doubles in the same playoff series since Jason Kidd had three triple-doubles in the 2002 Eastern Conference finals. In Game 6, he recorded a career-high 19 assists without a turnover, tying an NBA playoffs record. In the next round against the Orlando Magic, the Celtics lost the first game before Rondo's triple-double performance in game 2 helped secure a home win. His third triple-double of the postseason tied Larry Bird's franchise record and also became the first to do that since Jason Kidd had four. However, the Celtics were defeated in seven games in the Eastern Conference semifinals. During the postseason, Rondo nearly averaged a triple double with 16.9 points, 9.7 rebounds and 9.8 assists.

==== 2009–10 season: First All-Star selection ====
During the 2009–10 season, Rondo averaged career highs in points (13.7), assists (9.8) and steals (2.3) and became the first Celtic to lead the league in steals. On November 2, 2009, Rondo signed a five-year extension with the Celtics worth a guaranteed $55 million. In a road victory against the Orlando Magic on Christmas day, Rondo recorded 17 points, 13 rebounds and 8 assists, two assists shy of a triple double. Three days later, Rondo scored 30 points with 15 assists in a road loss to the Golden State Warriors. On January 10, 2010, Rondo recorded his third regular season career triple-double, with 22 points, 13 assists and 10 rebounds against the Toronto Raptors. On January 28, 2010, he received his first NBA All-Star selection as a reserve on the Eastern Conference squad for the 2010 NBA All-Star Game. He also competed in the 2010 H-O-R-S-E contest but lost in the finals to Kevin Durant. Rondo recorded his fourth regular season career triple-double against the Denver Nuggets on March 24, 2010, with 11 points, 15 assists and 11 rebounds. Two days later against the Sacramento Kings, Rondo entered the game tied with Rick Fox for a franchise record of most steals in a single-season (167), eventually establishing the record with a second-quarter steal from Sean May. In a game against the Houston Rockets on April 2, 2010, he broke Bob Cousy's franchise record for most assists in a single-season.

In the 2010 NBA Playoffs, the Celtics defeated the Miami Heat in five games and faced the Cleveland Cavaliers in the second round. In game 2, Rondo dished out 19 assists tying his career-high and also tying a franchise record for most assists in a playoff game. In game 4, he recorded his fourth postseason triple-double along with a playoff career-high 29 points and 18 rebounds. He joined Wilt Chamberlain and Oscar Robertson as the only other player in NBA history to have 29 points, 18 rebounds and 13 assists in a playoff game. The Celtics eventually defeated the Cavaliers and the Orlando Magic in the Eastern Conference finals in six games. In the Finals, the Celtics once again faced the Los Angeles Lakers, a team they previously beat in 2008. In game 2, Rondo recorded his second triple-double of the postseason (19 points, 12 rebounds and 10 assists), however, despite Rondo's performance, the Celtics succumbed to the Lakers in seven games.

==== 2010–11 season: Surging popularity ====
In the first game of the 2010–11 season, Rondo put up 17 assists, which tied with Oscar Robertson for the third-most assists in a season opener. In the third game of the season, he dished out a career-high 24 assists along with a triple-double (10 points and 10 rebounds) against the New York Knicks. It tied him with Isiah Thomas as the only players in NBA history to have at least 24 assists in a triple-double. His total of 50 assists through the first three games of the season tied John Stockton's NBA record for most assists in the first 3 games of the season. In the next game against the Detroit Pistons, he finished the game with 17 assists for a total of 67 assists, which is the most assists in the team's first four games in NBA history. With a 15 assists effort the following day, Rondo again set a record for most assists through the first five games.

Rondo's season also began with injuries. He played through plantar fasciitis in his feet. He missed three games in November due to a strained left hamstring. He sprained his left ankle in a win against the New York Knicks on December 15, 2010, and missed the next seven games. On April 22, in the third game of the first-round playoff series against the New York Knicks, Rondo had a triple-double with 20 assists. Rondo set a Celtics franchise record for most assists in a playoff game. He was also tied with LeBron James with 6 career triple-doubles in the playoffs until James reached his seventh further on in the playoffs during game 4 of the finals. Rondo had the third best selling jersey in the league during the 2010–11 season, behind only James and Kobe Bryant.

==== 2011–12 season: All-NBA selection ====
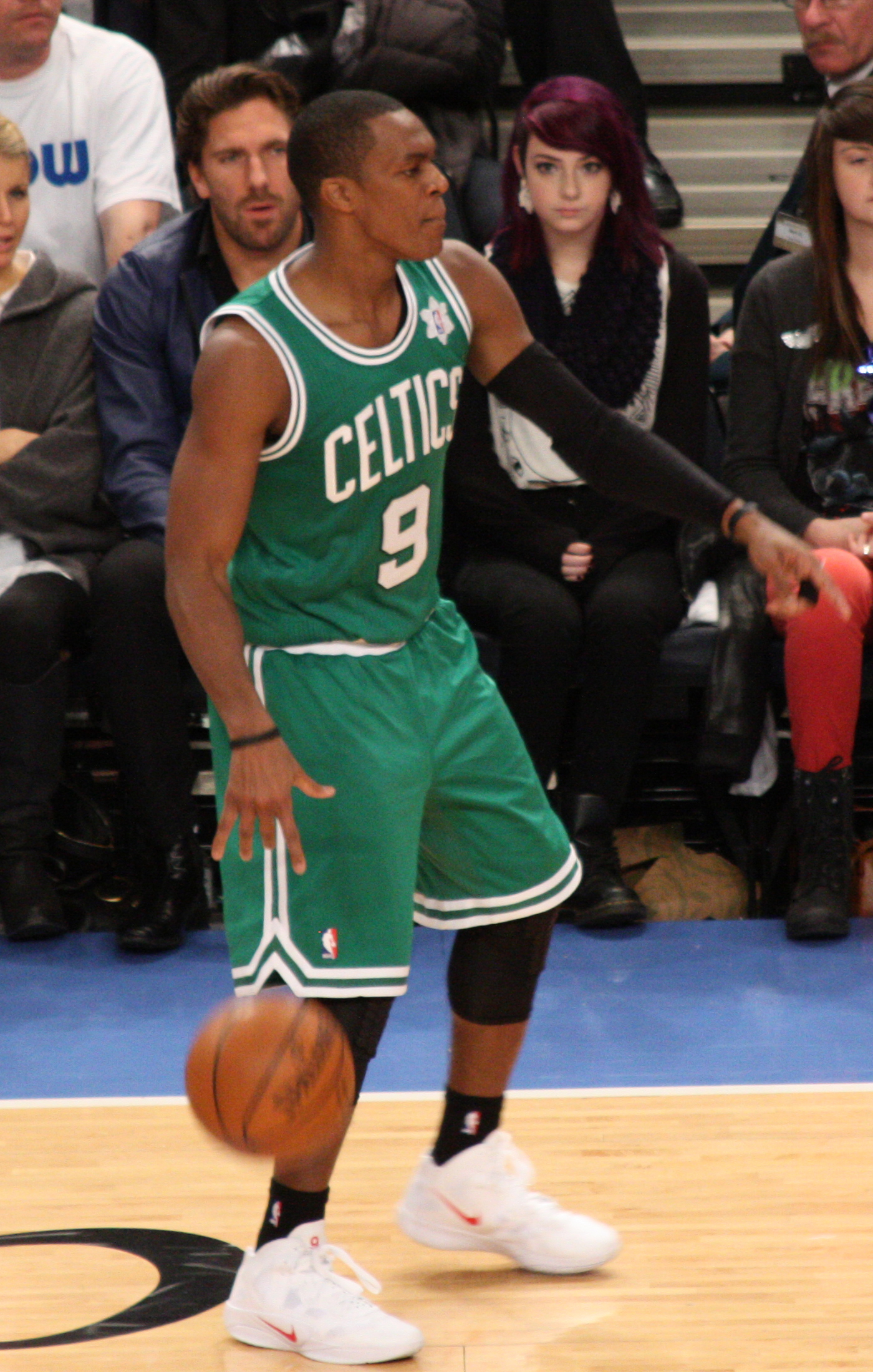
Rondo in December 2011

On February 21, 2012, Rondo was named an injury replacement for Joe Johnson on the Eastern Conference roster at the 2012 NBA All-Star Game. With 18 points, 17 rebounds, and 20 assists against the Knicks on March 4, he joined Wilt Chamberlain, Magic Johnson, and Jason Kidd as the only players to have at least 15 points, rebounds, and assists in the same game. In a win against the Heat on April 1, Rondo registered another triple-double (16 points, 14 assists and 11 rebounds). Rondo closed out the regular season with 24 consecutive games of 10 or more assists. This is not only a Celtics franchise record, but is also the longest streak the NBA has seen since John Stockton logged a streak of 29 such games in 1992. This streak was still considered active and resumed at the beginning of the 2012–13 regular season.

Rondo posted his sixth triple-double of the season (with 20 assists) in an overtime win against the Hawks on April 11. He had his first triple double of the 2012 playoffs against the same team on May 4, another on May 13 in the first game of the second round against the 76ers, and a third on May 26 in the last game of that round, helping the Celtics advance to the Eastern Conference finals. He joined Larry Bird as the only Celtics players to record a triple-double in a game 7. In game 2 of the Eastern Conference finals, Rondo scored a career-high 44 points while grabbing 8 rebounds and adding 10 assists. According to the Elias Sports Bureau, Rondo is the only player in NBA history with 44 points, 10 assists, and 8 rebounds in a playoff game. On June 6, 2012, Rondo passed Bob Cousy for having 39 playoff games of 10 or more assists, making him the Celtics' all-time leader in that area. Rondo recorded another triple double in the seventh game of the Eastern Conference finals, but the Celtics lost to the Miami Heat, ending their playoff run. This tenth playoff triple-double tied Rondo for third (with fellow Celtic Larry Bird) among NBA career leaders.

==== 2012–13 season: Season-ending injury ====
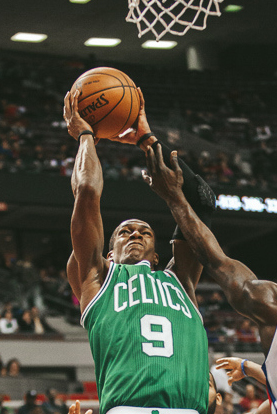
Rondo in January 2013

Rondo began the season with 24 consecutive games of 10+ assists. He continued that streak, and recorded his 37th game with 10+ assists against the Orlando Magic on November 25, 2012, matching John Stockton's longest streak. Only Magic Johnson had a longer streak (46 games). The streak ended the next game against the Brooklyn Nets, when he was ejected for fighting with Kris Humphries after Humphries fouled Rondo's teammate Kevin Garnett. Humphries was also ejected, along with Brooklyn's Gerald Wallace, who was accused of escalating the incident. Rondo only recorded three assists before he was ejected. Rondo was voted the starting point guard spot for the 2013 NBA All-Star Game, but on January 27, 2013, during a game with the Miami Heat, it was revealed that Rondo had torn his ACL and would miss the remainder of the season. Rondo still led the NBA in assists in the season.

==== 2013–14 season: Comeback ====
On January 15, 2014, Rondo was assigned to the Maine Red Claws of the NBA D-League for training and rehab purposes. Later that day, he was recalled by the Celtics.

On January 17, 2014, Rondo made his season debut with the Celtics, nearly a year after tearing his ACL. In 19 minutes of game time, he recorded 8 points, 4 assists and 2 rebounds in a 104–107 loss to the Los Angeles Lakers. Upon his return, he was named the 15th captain in Boston Celtics history. On February 2, 2014, in a 96–89 win over the Magic, Rondo recorded his first double-double since his injury (19 points, 10 assists). On April 4, 2014, Rondo recorded his first triple-double of the season with 11 points, 11 rebounds and 16 assists, in a 102–111 loss to the Philadelphia 76ers.

==== 2014–15 season: Final year in Boston ====
On September 26, 2014, Rondo was ruled out for six to eight weeks after undergoing surgery to repair a broken left hand. The injury was a result of a fall at his home the night before. After missing the entire preseason, Rondo returned for the regular season opener on October 29 and recorded 13 points, 12 assists and seven rebounds in 30 minutes to help the Celtics beat the Brooklyn Nets 121–105. On November 5, he recorded 13 points, 10 rebounds and 15 assists against the Toronto Raptors. On December 2, he recorded 19 assists and 12 rebounds against the Atlanta Hawks. On December 7, he recorded 13 points, 13 rebounds and 11 assists against the Washington Wizards. On December 10, he recorded 12 points, 10 rebounds and 10 assists against the Charlotte Hornets. On December 17, in his final game as a Celtic, Rondo recorded 13 points, 15 assists and seven rebounds in a 109–92 win over the Orlando Magic.

=== Dallas Mavericks (2014–2015) ===
On December 18, 2014, Rondo was traded, along with Dwight Powell, to the Dallas Mavericks in exchange for Jae Crowder, Jameer Nelson, Brandan Wright, a 2015 first-round pick and a 2016 second-round pick. He made his debut for the Mavericks two days later, scoring six points on 3-for-11 shooting to go with nine assists and seven rebounds in a 99–93 win over the San Antonio Spurs. In his return to Boston on January 2, 2015, Rondo scored a career-high 15 first-quarter points, finishing with a season-best 29 to lead Dallas to a 119–101 victory. Rondo also had a career-high five 3-pointers and finished with six rebounds and five assists. Throughout January however, cracks began to appear in the relationship between Rondo and the Mavericks. Rondo struggled to fit in the Mavericks' system, and he often butted heads with head coach Rick Carlisle. While there were no reported issues off the court, Rondo's lack of chemistry with his teammates was noticeable throughout the season. And while the Mavericks' defense slightly improved with the acquisition of Rondo, their offense took a noticeable step backward, dropping from the best in the league to fourth in points per game by late February. In late April, Rondo and the Mavericks mutually agreed to part ways following a tumultuous end to the season. Rondo was benched after game 2 of the Mavericks' first-round playoff series against the Houston Rockets and did not play again as Dallas was eliminated in five games. The team claimed that a back injury had sidelined Rondo indefinitely, but reports later surfaced that that was simply to "save face" after the two sides decided to part ways. His teammates also reportedly opted not to give him a playoff share.

=== Sacramento Kings (2015–2016) ===
On July 13, 2015, Rondo signed a one-year, $10 million contract with the Sacramento Kings. He made his debut for the Kings in their season opener on October 28, 2015, recording four points, seven rebounds and four assists in a 111–104 loss to the Los Angeles Clippers. Two days later, he recorded 21 points and eight assists in a 132–114 win over the Los Angeles Lakers. On November 13, he recorded his third triple-double in four games and 25th of his career with 23 points, 10 rebounds and 14 assists in a 111–109 win over the Brooklyn Nets. On November 18, he recorded his fourth triple-double of the season with 12 points, 12 rebounds and 10 assists in a 103–97 loss to the Atlanta Hawks. On November 23, he recorded 14 points and a season-high 20 assists in a 127–122 overtime loss to the Charlotte Hornets. On November 27, he had 16 points and 16 assists in a 101–91 loss to the Minnesota Timberwolves. He became the first player since 1977–78 to have 16 points, 16 assists and no turnovers in a game.

Rondo was ejected from the Kings' December 3 game against the Boston Celtics by Bill Kennedy, and in response, Rondo called Kennedy a "faggot". Kennedy publicly came out as gay just over a week later, and Rondo was suspended by the NBA for one game without pay on December 14. After posting two statements on Twitter that were widely panned as not being apologetic, Rondo issued a more contrite apology on December 15.

On January 23, 2016, Rondo recorded his fifth triple-double of the season with 11 points, 10 rebounds and 10 assists in a 108–97 win over the Indiana Pacers. Two days later, he had 20 assists and 10 rebounds in a 129–128 double-overtime loss to the Hornets, thus recording 10 or more assists in 12 straight games, a Sacramento record. The streak ended at 14 games. On February 19, he recorded a near triple-double with a then season-high 24 points, 10 rebounds, nine assists and five steals in a 116–110 win over the Denver Nuggets. On February 29, Rondo had 11 points, 12 assists and nine rebounds in a 131–116 loss to the Oklahoma City Thunder. He reached double figures in assists for the 39th time in 2015–16, tying a Sacramento record established by Reggie Theus in 1985–86. On March 25, he had 12 assists against the Phoenix Suns and passed Theus' record. On April 5, he recorded his sixth triple-double of the season with a season-high 27 points, 12 assists and 10 rebounds in a 115–107 loss to the Portland Trail Blazers, setting a Kings franchise record for triple-doubles in a season.

=== Chicago Bulls (2016–2017) ===
On July 7, 2016, Rondo signed a two-year, $28 million contract with the Chicago Bulls. He made his debut for the Bulls in their season opener on October 27, recording 4 points, 6 rebounds, 9 assists and 2 steals in a 105–99 win over the Boston Celtics. On November 10, he had a then season-best game with 16 points and 12 assists in a 98–95 win over the Miami Heat. On December 2, he recorded his first triple-double of the season with 15 points, 12 assists and 11 rebounds in a 111–105 win over the Cleveland Cavaliers. Three days later, he was suspended by the Bulls for one game for conduct detrimental to the team. On January 10, 2017, Rondo scored 12 points against the Washington Wizards in his first game since December 30. In that December 30 game, he posted a plus-minus rating of minus-20 during 11 first-half minutes in Chicago's 111–101 loss to the Indiana Pacers. He was subsequently removed from coach Fred Hoiberg's rotation for five games before being reinserted following injuries to Dwyane Wade and Jimmy Butler. On March 13, 2017, he scored a season-high 20 points and had six assists and seven rebounds in his first start since December 30 as the Bulls beat the Charlotte Hornets 115–109. He bested that mark on March 21, scoring 24 points in a 122–120 overtime loss to the Toronto Raptors. On April 1, he had a season-high 25 points and added 11 rebounds in a 106–104 win over the Atlanta Hawks. On April 21, Rondo was ruled out indefinitely after breaking his right thumb in game 2 of the Bulls' first-round playoff series against the Celtics. While the Bulls went up 2–0 in the series with Rondo, they never found their rhythm over the final four games without Rondo; as a result, they lost to the Celtics in six games. On June 30, 2017, he was waived by the Bulls.

=== New Orleans Pelicans (2017–2018) ===
On July 19, 2017, Rondo signed a one-year, $3.3 million contract with the New Orleans Pelicans. On October 8, 2017, he was diagnosed with a sports hernia. Two days later, he underwent surgery and was ruled out for four to six weeks. He made his debut for the Pelicans on November 13, 2017, against the Atlanta Hawks, recording two points and two assists in about five minutes in the first half. He made his first start of the season two days later, recording four points and eight assists in 14 minutes in a 125–116 loss to the Toronto Raptors. On December 10, 2017, he recorded 13 points and 18 assists in a 131–124 win over the Philadelphia 76ers. On December 27, 2017, he set a franchise record with a career-high 25 assists in a 128–113 win over the Brooklyn Nets. He broke Chris Paul's mark with his 22nd assist and became just the seventh player in NBA history to reach 25 assists in a game, joining Scott Skiles, John Stockton, Jason Kidd, Kevin Johnson, Nate McMillan and Isiah Thomas. On January 8, 2018, Rondo had 12 points and 15 assists in a 112–109 win over the Detroit Pistons. He had nine of his assists in the first quarter, tying a franchise record. On February 10, 2018, he recorded 25 points, 12 assists and 10 rebounds in a 138–128 double overtime win over the Brooklyn Nets. In the Pelicans' regular season finale on April 11, 2018, Rondo had 19 points and 14 assists in a 122–98 win over the San Antonio Spurs. In game 1 of the Pelicans' first-round playoff series against the Portland Trail Blazers, Rondo tied a franchise record with 17 assists to go with eight rebounds and six points in a 97–95 win. In game 2, Rondo had 16 points, 10 rebounds and nine assists in a 111–102 win. In game 4, Rondo had 16 assists, as the Pelicans completed a first-round sweep of the Trail Blazers with a 131–123 victory. In the second round against the Golden State Warriors, Rondo had 21 assists in game 3, the Pelicans' only win before being eliminated in five games.

=== Los Angeles Lakers (2018–2020) ===
==== 2018–19 season: Missing playoffs ====
On July 6, 2018, Rondo signed a one-year, $9 million contract with the Los Angeles Lakers, who expected him to mentor and compete with second-year point guard Lonzo Ball. In his debut for the Lakers in their season opener on October 18, Rondo recorded 13 points and 11 assists in a 128–119 loss to the Portland Trail Blazers. Two days later, in a game against the Houston Rockets, Rondo and Chris Paul got into a fist fight over a shove by Brandon Ingram delivered to James Harden. The conflict, worsened due to Paul's claim that Rondo spat on him, resulted in Rondo receiving a three-game suspension. After breaking his right hand in a 126–117 win over the Trail Blazers on November 14, Rondo was ruled out for four to five weeks. In his return game on December 21 after missing 17 games, Rondo had eight points and nine assists off the bench in a 112–104 win over the New Orleans Pelicans. On December 25 against the Golden State Warriors, after just three games back from his hand injury, Rondo suffered a sprain to his right ring finger. He underwent surgery three days later and was subsequently ruled out for an estimated four to five weeks. He returned to action on January 24, 2019, after missing 14 games, recording 15 points, 13 assists and six rebounds in a 120–105 loss to the Minnesota Timberwolves. On February 7, he hit a 20-foot jumper as time expired in Boston to lift the Lakers to a 129–128 win over the Celtics, as he finished with 17 points and 10 assists. It was his first career go-ahead field goal in the final 10 seconds of the fourth quarter or overtime. On March 4, Rondo moved to 11th place in triple-doubles in NBA history, while also becoming the second player (the other being Mark Jackson) to record a triple-double with five different teams, when he recorded his 32nd triple-double with a season-high 24 points, 10 rebounds and 12 assists as the Lakers lost 113–105 to the Clippers. On March 29, he had 17 assists and five steals in a 123–115 win over the Charlotte Hornets, becoming the first Lakers' player with at least 17 assists and five steals since Magic Johnson in December 1989.

==== 2019–20 season: Second championship ====
On July 8, 2019, Rondo re-signed with the Lakers, and went on to play an integral part in the team's 2020 NBA Finals series win, his first in 12 years and becoming the second player in NBA history, after Clyde Lovellette, to win a championship with both the Boston Celtics and the Lakers, with Rondo being the first to win with Los Angeles as Lovellette won with the Minneapolis Lakers. Rondo's 105 assists in the 2020 NBA playoffs are the most by a bench player in a single postseason since the 1971 playoffs, surpassing Manu Ginóbili's 95 assists in 2014.

=== Atlanta Hawks (2020–2021) ===
On November 23, 2020, Rondo signed a multi-year deal with the Atlanta Hawks. On December 28, 2020, Rondo made his Hawks debut, putting up 12 points and eight assists in a 128–120 win against the Detroit Pistons.

=== Los Angeles Clippers (2021) ===
On March 25, 2021, Rondo was traded to the Los Angeles Clippers in exchange for Lou Williams, two second-round draft picks and cash considerations. On April 4, he made his debut in a 104–86 win over his former team, the Los Angeles Lakers, and recorded two points and three assists in 13 minutes. On April 8, he recorded 15 points and nine assists, both season highs, off the bench in a 113–103 win over the Phoenix Suns.

On August 16, 2021, Rondo was traded, alongside Daniel Oturu, Patrick Beverley and a second-round draft pick to the Memphis Grizzlies in exchange for Eric Bledsoe. Twelve days later, he agreed to a buyout and was waived.

=== Return to the Lakers (2021–2022) ===
On August 31, 2021, Rondo signed a one-year deal to return to the Lakers.

=== Cleveland Cavaliers (2022) ===
On January 3, 2022, the Lakers traded Rondo to the Cleveland Cavaliers as part of a three-team deal that also included the New York Knicks. He made his debut for the Cavaliers on January 7, recording 11 points, five rebounds, and three assists in a 114–101 win over the Portland Trail Blazers.

On April 2, 2024, Rondo announced his retirement from basketball.

== Post-playing career ==
=== Coaching ===
Before the 2024–25 NBA season, Rondo was invited by Doc Rivers, his former head coach with the Boston Celtics, to serve as a guest coach at the Milwaukee Bucks' training camp. Rivers said Rondo would be around the team part-time and was considering a future in coaching, but was focused primarily on training his own son as a basketball player.

=== Flag football ===
In 2026 Sports Illustrated reported that Rondo had received an invitation from USA Football to try out for the national flag football team, and the International Flag League announced he was to play the sport professionally in their league. It was reported at that time that he had reached top ranking among flag football quarterbacks in the United States in 2026.

== Career statistics ==
Legend
GP	Games played	GS	Games started	MPG	Minutes per game
FG%	Field goal percentage	3P%	3-point field goal percentage	FT%	Free throw percentage
RPG	Rebounds per game	APG	Assists per game	SPG	Steals per game
BPG	Blocks per game	PPG	Points per game	**Bold**	Career high
†	Won an NBA championship	*	Led the league	‡	NBA record

=== NBA ===
==== Regular season ====
Year	Team	GP	GS	MPG	FG%	3P%	FT%	RPG	APG	SPG	BPG	PPG
2006–07	Boston	78	25	23.5	.418	.207	.647	3.7	3.8	1.6	.1	6.4
2007–08†	Boston	77	77	29.9	.492	.263	.611	4.2	5.1	1.7	**.2**	10.6
2008–09	Boston	80	80	33.0	.505	.313	.642	5.2	8.2	1.9	.1	11.9
2009–10	Boston	**81**	**81**	36.6	**.508**	.213	.621	4.4	9.8	**2.3***	.1	**13.7**
2010–11	Boston	68	68	37.2	.475	.233	.568	4.4	11.2	**2.3**	**.2**	10.6
2011–12	Boston	53	53	36.9	.448	.238	.597	4.8	**11.7***	1.8	.1	11.9
2012–13	Boston	38	38	**37.4**	.484	.240	.645	5.6	11.1*	1.8	**.2**	**13.7**
2013–14	Boston	30	30	33.3	.403	.289	.627	5.5	9.8	1.3	.1	11.7
2014–15	Boston	22	22	31.8	.405	.250	.333	**7.5**	10.8	1.7	.1	8.3
2014–15	Dallas	46	46	28.7	.436	.352	.452	4.5	6.5	1.2	.1	9.3
2015–16	Sacramento	72	72	35.2	.454	.365	.580	6.0	**11.7***	2.0	.1	11.9
2016–17	Chicago	69	42	26.7	.408	.376	.600	5.1	6.7	1.4	**.2**	7.8
2017–18	New Orleans	65	63	26.2	.468	.333	.543	4.0	8.2	1.1	**.2**	8.3
2018–19	L.A. Lakers	46	29	29.8	.405	.359	.639	5.3	8.0	1.2	**.2**	9.2
2019–20†	L.A. Lakers	48	3	20.5	.418	.328	.659	3.0	5.0	.8	.0	7.1
2020–21	Atlanta	27	2	14.9	.400	.378	.500	2.0	3.5	.7	.1	3.9
2020–21	L.A. Clippers	18	1	20.4	.486	**.432**	**1.000**	3.1	5.8	1.0	.1	7.6
2021–22	L.A. Lakers	18	0	16.1	.324	.267	.500	2.7	3.7	.7	**.3**	3.1
2021–22	Cleveland	21	1	19.4	.429	.397	.750	2.8	4.9	.9	.0	6.2
Career		957	733	29.9	.456	.324	.611	4.5	7.9	1.6	.1	9.8
All-Star		3	0	18.7	.545	.000	.000	1.7	7.0	.3	.0	4.0

==== Playoffs ====
Year	Team	GP	GS	MPG	FG%	3P%	FT%	RPG	APG	SPG	BPG	PPG
2008†	Boston	**26**‡	**26**‡	32.0	.407	.250	.691	4.1	6.6	1.7	.3	10.2
2009	Boston	14	14	41.2	.417	.250	.657	**9.7**	9.8	2.5	.2	16.9
2010	Boston	24	24	40.6	.463	.375	.596	5.6	9.3	1.9	.1	15.8
2011	Boston	9	9	38.3	**.477**	.000	.632	5.4	9.6	1.1	.0	14.0
2012	Boston	19	19	**42.6**	.468	.267	**.696**	6.7	11.9	2.4	.1	**17.3**
2015	Dallas	2	2	18.6	.450	**.500**	.000	1.0	3.0	.0	.0	9.5
2017	Chicago	2	2	33.7	.423	.000	.500	8.5	10.0	**3.5**	**.5**	11.5
2018	New Orleans	9	9	33.6	.413	.421	.643	7.6	**12.2**	1.4	.2	10.3
2020†	L.A. Lakers	16	0	24.7	.455	.400	.684	4.3	6.6	1.4	.1	8.9
2021	L.A. Clippers	13	0	16.9	.340	.393	.667	2.6	3.8	.4	.2	4.2
Career		134	105	34.0	.440	.330	.649	5.6	8.5	1.7	.2	12.5

=== College ===
Year	Team	GP	GS	MPG	FG%	3P%	FT%	RPG	APG	SPG	BPG	PPG
2004–05	Kentucky	**34**	**34**	25.1	**.510**	**.303**	**.583**	2.9	3.5	**2.6**	**.2**	8.1
2005–06	Kentucky	**34**	28	**31.0**	.482	.273	.571	**6.1**	**4.9**	2.0	.1	**11.2**
Career		68	62	28.1	.493	.283	.577	4.5	4.2	2.3	.2	9.6

== Awards and honors ==
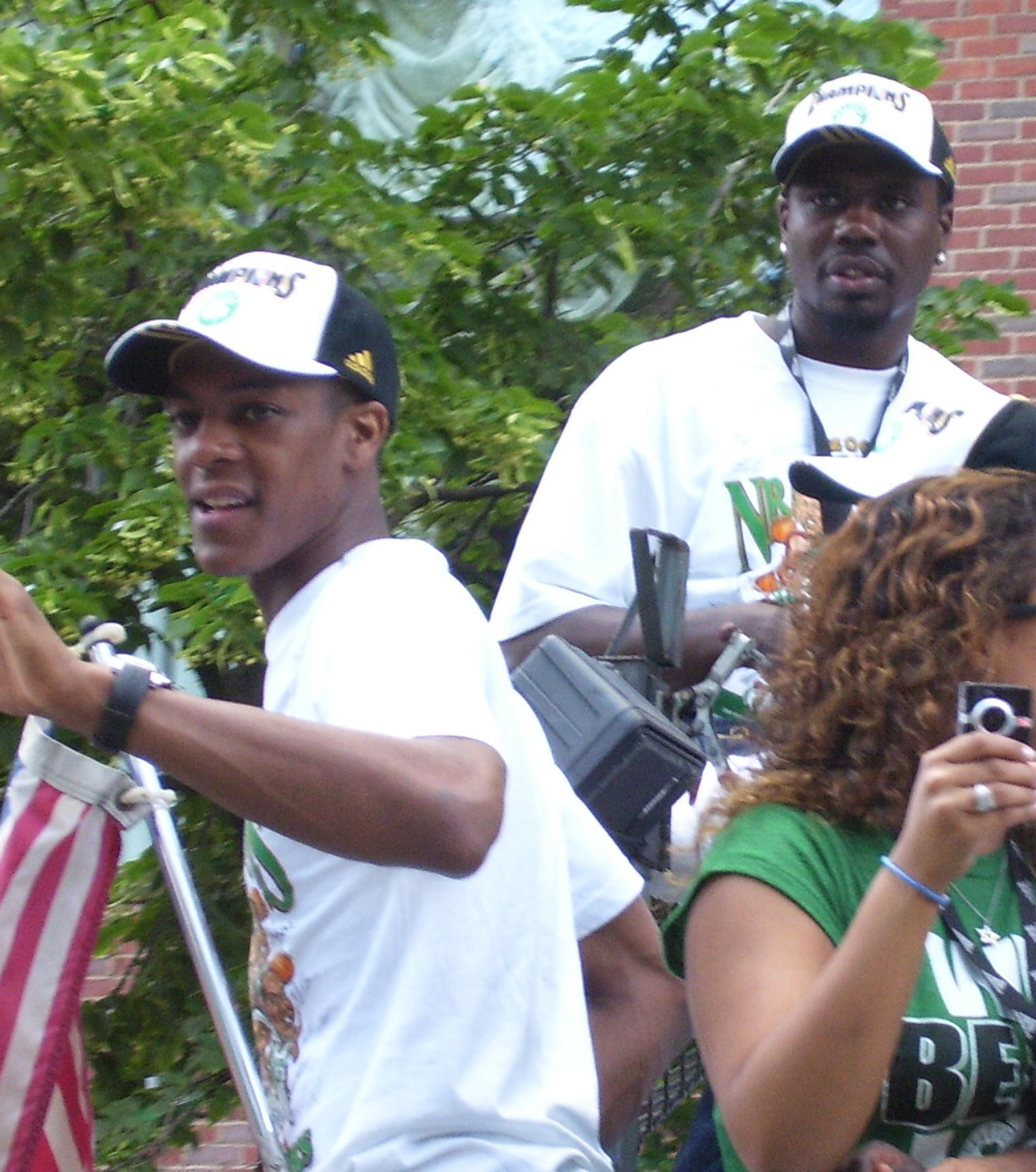
Rondo during the Celtics' 2008 championship parade

- 2–time NBA champion: 2008, 2020
- 4–time NBA All-Star: 2010, 2011, 2012, 2013
- All-NBA Team Third Team: 2012
- 4–time NBA All-Defensive Team selections:
  - 2–time First Team: 2010, 2011
  - 2–time Second Team: 2009, 2012
- 3–time NBA assists leader: 2012, 2013, 2016
- NBA steals leader: 2010
- NBA All-Rookie Second Team: 2007

== Records ==
NBA regular season:

- 2010: most steals (189), most steals per game (2.3)
- 2012: most assists per game (11.7), most triple-doubles (6)
- 2013: most assists per game (11.1), most triple-doubles (5)
- 2016: most assists per game (11.7), most assists (839)

NBA playoffs:

- 2008: most assists (172), most steals (45)
- 2009: most assists (127), most triple-doubles (3)
- 2010: most triple-doubles (2), most steals (46)
- 2011: most triple-doubles (1)
- 2012: most assists (227), most assists per game (11.9), most triple-doubles (4)

Boston Celtics:

- Most assists in a single season: 794 (2009–10)
- Most steals in a single season: 189 (2009–10)
- Most assists in a playoff game: 20 (2010–11)
- Most assists per game (season): 11.7 (2011–12)

New Orleans Pelicans:

- Most assists in a game: 25 (2017–18)
- Most assists in a playoff game: 21 (2017–18)

== Legal issues ==
In May 2022, Rondo allegedly threatened a woman with a gun at her home in Louisville, Kentucky. The woman would be granted an emergency protective order. In June 2022, the protective order was dismissed after "parties reached an agreement."

Rondo was arrested in January 2024 for unlawful possession of a firearm, drug paraphernalia and marijuana. The arrest came after he was pulled over for reckless driving. He would be released after posting a $700 bond. Though all of the initial charges he was arrested for were considered to be only misdemeanors, it was later acknowledged that his 2022 legal agreement included a no-contact order which forbade him from keeping a gun. An initial court hearing has been scheduled to be held on February 27, 2024. Rondo initially pled not guilty to all charges. The case was postponed for several months, while awaiting the decision of the United States Supreme Court on United States v. Rahimi, which directly pertained to Rondo's defense on the gun charge. Following the Supreme Court's decision, an August 1, trial date was set for Rondo. This trial date was subsequently canceled when a change of plea hearing was scheduled for September 3.

== See also ==
- List of NBA annual steals leaders
- List of NBA annual assists leaders
- List of NBA career assists leaders
- List of NBA career triple-double leaders
- List of NBA career playoff assists leaders
- List of NBA career playoff steals leaders
- List of NBA career playoff triple-double leaders
- List of NBA single-game assists leaders
