= Tsakalidis =

Tsakalidis (Greek: Τσακαλίδης) is a Greek surname. Notable people with the surname include:

- Jake Tsakalidis (born 1979), Georgian/Greek basketball player who played in the National Basketball Association
