= 2006–07 Denver Nuggets season =

NBA professional basketball team season

- Head coach: George Karl
- General manager: Mark Warkentien
- Owner: Stan Kroenke
- Arena: Pepsi Center

Results
- Record: 45–37 (.549)
- Place: Division: 2nd (Northwest); Conference: 6th (Western)
- Playoff finish: First Round (lost to Spurs 1–4)
- Stats at Basketball Reference

Local media
- Television: Altitude Sports and Entertainment
- Radio: KCKK

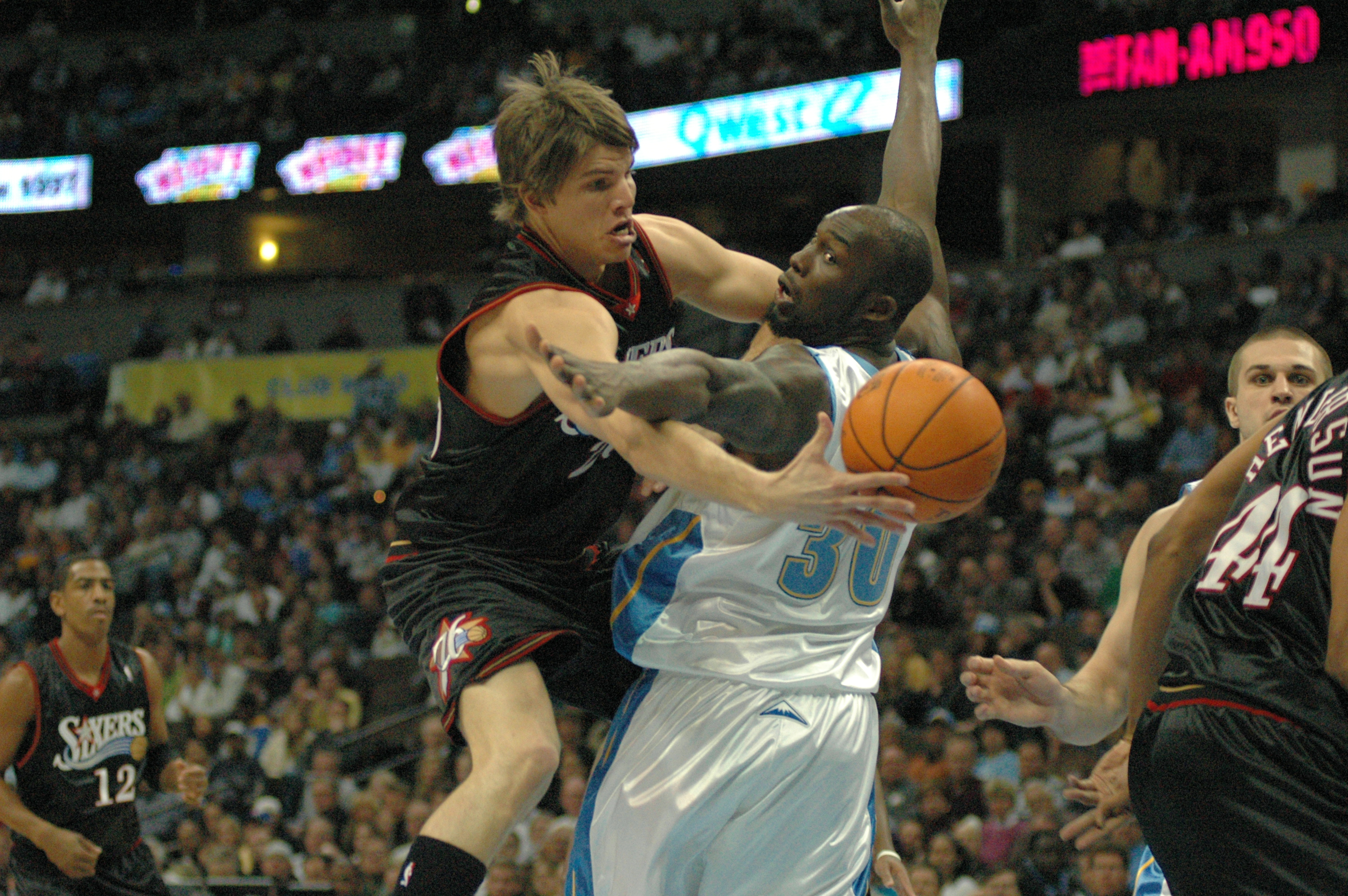
Philadelphia forward Kyle Korver attempts to get past Denver forward Reggie Evans while playing the Philadelphia Sixers at the Pepsi Center.

The 2006–07 Denver Nuggets season was the 40th season of the franchise, 31st in the National Basketball Association (NBA). The season is best remembered when Carmelo Anthony made headlines on December 16 when he was involved in a brawl against the Knicks, and as a result was suspended for 15 games. The next day, the Nuggets acquired Allen Iverson from Philadelphia. Anthony and the newly acquired Iverson played their first game together on January 22, 2007, in a game against Memphis. The Nuggets finished the year at 45–37, making the postseason for the fourth straight year. However, they did not make it out of the first round, losing to the eventual champion San Antonio Spurs in five games. Anthony and Iverson were voted to play in the 2007 NBA All-Star Game although Iverson did not play due to an injury. This was Anthony's first All-Star game appearance.

== Draft picks ==
| Round | Pick | Player | Position | Nationality | School/Club team |
|---|---|---|---|---|---|
| 2 | 49 | Leon Powe | | United States | California |

== Roster ==
2006–07 Denver Nuggets roster
Players

| Pos. | No. | Player | Height | Weight | DOB | From |
|---|---|---|---|---|---|---|
| SF | 15 | Carmelo Anthony | 6 ft 8 in (2.03 m) | 230 lb (104 kg) | 1984-05-29 | Syracuse |
| PG | 25 | Steve Blake | 6 ft 3 in (1.91 m) | 172 lb (78 kg) | 1980-02-26 | Maryland |
| C | 23 | Marcus Camby | 6 ft 11 in (2.11 m) | 235 lb (107 kg) | 1974-03-22 | UMass |
| PG | 4 | Anthony Carter | 6 ft 1 in (1.85 m) | 195 lb (88 kg) | 1975-06-16 | Hawaiʻi |
| SG | 5 | Yakhouba Diawara | 6 ft 7 in (2.01 m) | 225 lb (102 kg) | 1982-08-29 | Pepperdine |
| PF | 30 | Reggie Evans | 6 ft 8 in (2.03 m) | 245 lb (111 kg) | 1980-05-18 | Iowa |
| SG | 3 | Allen Iverson | 6 ft 0 in (1.83 m) | 180 lb (82 kg) | 1975-06-07 | Georgetown |
| SF | 8 | DerMarr Johnson | 6 ft 9 in (2.06 m) | 201 lb (91 kg) | 1980-05-05 | Cincinnati |
| PF | 43 | Linas Kleiza | 6 ft 8 in (2.03 m) | 245 lb (111 kg) | 1985-01-03 | Missouri |
| PF | 6 | Kenyon Martin | 6 ft 9 in (2.06 m) | 240 lb (109 kg) | 1977-12-30 | Cincinnati |
| PF | 21 | Eduardo Nájera | 6 ft 8 in (2.03 m) | 235 lb (107 kg) | 1976-07-11 | Oklahoma |
| C | 31 | Nenê | 6 ft 11 in (2.11 m) | 268 lb (122 kg) | 1982-09-13 | Brazil |
| C | 7 | Jamal Sampson | 6 ft 11 in (2.11 m) | 235 lb (107 kg) | 1983-05-15 | California |
| SG | 1 | J.R. Smith | 6 ft 6 in (1.98 m) | 220 lb (100 kg) | 1985-09-09 | St. Benedict's Prep HS (NJ) |

Coaches
Head coach
- George Karl
Assistant(s)
- Bill Branch
- Rick Brunson
- Adrian Dantley
- Mike Dunlap
- Tim Grgurich
- Doug Moe
- Jamahl Mosley
- John Welch

Legend
- (DP) Unsigned draft pick
- (FA) Free agent
- (S) Suspended
- Injured

Roster
Updated: April 12, 2007

== Regular season ==
=== Season standings ===
| Northwest Division | W | L | PCT | GB | Home | Road | Div |
|---|---|---|---|---|---|---|---|
| y-Utah Jazz | 51 | 31 | .634 | - | 31–10 | 20–21 | 10–6 |
| x-Denver Nuggets | 45 | 37 | .549 | 6 | 23–18 | 22–19 | 9–7 |
| Portland Trail Blazers | 32 | 50 | .390 | 19 | 18–23 | 14–27 | 7–9 |
| Minnesota Timberwolves | 32 | 50 | .390 | 19 | 20–21 | 12–29 | 6–10 |
| Seattle SuperSonics | 31 | 51 | .378 | 20 | 20–21 | 11–30 | 8–8 |

| # | Western Conference | | | | |
| # | Team | W | L | PCT | GB |
|---|---|---|---|---|---|
| 1 | z-Dallas Mavericks | 67 | 15 | .817 | - |
| 2 | y-Phoenix Suns | 61 | 21 | .744 | 6 |
| 3 | x-San Antonio Spurs | 58 | 24 | .707 | 9 |
| 4 | y-Utah Jazz | 51 | 31 | .622 | 16 |
| 5 | x-Houston Rockets | 52 | 30 | .634 | 15 |
| 6 | x-Denver Nuggets | 45 | 37 | .549 | 22 |
| 7 | x-Los Angeles Lakers | 42 | 40 | .512 | 25 |
| 8 | x-Golden State Warriors | 42 | 40 | .512 | 25 |
| 9 | Los Angeles Clippers | 40 | 42 | .488 | 27 |
| 10 | New Orleans/Oklahoma City Hornets | 39 | 43 | .476 | 28 |
| 11 | Sacramento Kings | 33 | 49 | .402 | 34 |
| 12 | Portland Trail Blazers | 32 | 50 | .390 | 35 |
| 13 | Minnesota Timberwolves | 32 | 50 | .390 | 35 |
| 14 | Seattle SuperSonics | 31 | 51 | .378 | 36 |
| 15 | Memphis Grizzlies | 22 | 60 | .268 | 45 |

== Playoffs ==
2007 playoff game log
First Round: 1–4 (home: 0–2; road: 1–2)

| Game | Date | Team | Score | High points | High rebounds | High assists | Location Attendance | Series |
|---|---|---|---|---|---|---|---|---|
| 1 | April 24 | @ San Antonio | W 95–89 | Allen Iverson (31) | Nenê (12) | Allen Iverson (5) | AT&T Center; 18,797 | 1–0 |
| 2 | April 27 | @ San Antonio | L 88–97 | Carmelo Anthony (26) | Marcus Camby (18) | Steve Blake (7) | AT&T Center; 18,797 | 1–1 |
| 3 | April 30 | San Antonio | L 91–96 | Carmelo Anthony (28) | Carmelo Anthony (12) | Steve Blake (7) | Pepsi Center; 19,951 | 1–2 |
| 4 | May 2 | San Antonio | L 89–96 | Carmelo Anthony (29) | Marcus Camby (17) | Allen Iverson (7) | Pepsi Center; 19,644 | 1–3 |
| 5 | May 4 | @ San Antonio | L 78–93 | Iverson, Anthony (21) | Marcus Camby (19) | Allen Iverson (8) | AT&T Center; 18,797 | 1–4 |

2007 schedule

== Player statistics ==
Legend
| GP | Games played | GS | Games started | MPG | Minutes per game |
| FG% | Field-goal percentage | 3P% | 3-point field-goal percentage | FT% | Free-throw percentage |
| RPG | Rebounds per game | APG | Assists per game | SPG | Steals per game |
| BPG | Blocks per game | PPG | Points per game |

=== Regular season ===
| Player | GP | GS | MPG | FG% | 3P% | FT% | RPG | APG | SPG | BPG | PPG |
|---|---|---|---|---|---|---|---|---|---|---|---|
| Carmelo Anthony | 65 | 65 | 38.2 | .476 | .268 | .808 | 6.0 | 3.8 | 1.2 | .4 | 28.9 |
| Steve Blake | 49 | 40 | 33.5 | .432 | .343 | .727 | 2.5 | 6.6 | 1.0 | .1 | 8.3 |
| Earl Boykins | 31 | 4 | 28.3 | .413 | .373 | .908 | 2.0 | 4.3 | .8 | .1 | 15.2 |
| Marcus Camby | 70 | 70 | 33.8 | .473 | .000 | .729 | 11.7 | 3.2 | 1.2 | 3.3 | 11.2 |
| Anthony Carter | 2 | 0 | 18.5 | .375 | .000 | . | 1.5 | 5.5 | .0 | .5 | 3.0 |
| Yakhouba Diawara | 64 | 19 | 18.4 | .342 | .288 | .660 | 1.7 | .9 | .5 | .1 | 4.4 |
| Reggie Evans | 66 | 11 | 17.1 | .544 | . | .497 | 7.0 | .7 | .6 | .2 | 4.9 |
| Nene Hilario | 64 | 42 | 26.8 | .570 | .000 | .689 | 7.0 | 1.2 | 1.0 | .9 | 12.2 |
| Julius Hodge | 4 | 1 | 9.3 | .400 | . | 1.000 | .8 | 2.5 | .8 | .0 | 1.5 |
| Allen Iverson | 50 | 49 | 42.4 | .454 | .347 | .759 | 3.0 | 7.2 | 1.8 | .2 | 24.8 |
| DerMarr Johnson | 39 | 7 | 10.7 | .325 | .216 | .762 | 1.5 | .4 | .4 | .3 | 3.5 |
| Linas Kleiza | 79 | 14 | 18.8 | .422 | .376 | .852 | 3.4 | .6 | .4 | .2 | 7.6 |
| Kenyon Martin | 2 | 2 | 31.5 | .500 | .000 | .250 | 10.0 | .5 | .0 | .0 | 9.5 |
| Andre Miller | 23 | 23 | 35.7 | .472 | .250 | .729 | 4.5 | 9.1 | 1.6 | .2 | 13.0 |
| Eduardo Najera | 75 | 36 | 22.1 | .576 | .083 | .715 | 4.1 | .9 | 1.0 | .3 | 6.6 |
| Jamal Sampson | 22 | 3 | 5.7 | .643 | .000 | .429 | 2.2 | .2 | .1 | .3 | 1.1 |
| J. R. Smith | 63 | 24 | 23.3 | .441 | .390 | .810 | 2.3 | 1.4 | .8 | .1 | 13.0 |
| Joe Smith | 11 | 0 | 13.5 | .479 | .000 | .833 | 3.6 | .3 | .5 | .6 | 5.1 |

=== Playoffs ===
| Player | GP | GS | MPG | FG% | 3P% | FT% | RPG | APG | SPG | BPG | PPG |
|---|---|---|---|---|---|---|---|---|---|---|---|
| Carmelo Anthony | 5 | 5 | 42.0 | .480 | .500 | .795 | 8.6 | 1.2 | 1.0 | .0 | 26.8 |
| Steve Blake | 5 | 5 | 36.0 | .452 | .500 | . | 2.4 | 4.6 | .6 | .0 | 7.2 |
| Marcus Camby | 5 | 5 | 36.8 | .378 | . | .667 | 14.8 | 2.0 | .8 | 3.2 | 7.6 |
| Anthony Carter | 1 | 0 | 14.0 | 1.000 | . | .000 | 1.0 | 2.0 | .0 | .0 | 8.0 |
| Yakhouba Diawara | 1 | 0 | 1.0 | . | . | . | .0 | .0 | .0 | .0 | .0 |
| Nene Hilario | 5 | 5 | 35.8 | .585 | . | .778 | 7.8 | 2.4 | .6 | .6 | 15.2 |
| Allen Iverson | 5 | 5 | 44.6 | .368 | .294 | .806 | .6 | 5.8 | 1.4 | .0 | 22.8 |
| Linas Kleiza | 5 | 0 | 13.2 | .231 | .167 | .500 | 1.6 | .4 | .0 | .0 | 1.6 |
| Eduardo Najera | 5 | 0 | 19.2 | .235 | .000 | .500 | 5.6 | .4 | .4 | .2 | 1.8 |
| J. R. Smith | 4 | 0 | 11.8 | .273 | .000 | 1.000 | 2.3 | .5 | 1.0 | .3 | 4.5 |

== Awards and records ==
- Marcus Camby, NBA Defensive Player of the Year Award
- Carmelo Anthony, All-NBA Third Team
- Marcus Camby, NBA All-Defensive First Team
