= Will Conroy =

American basketball player and coach

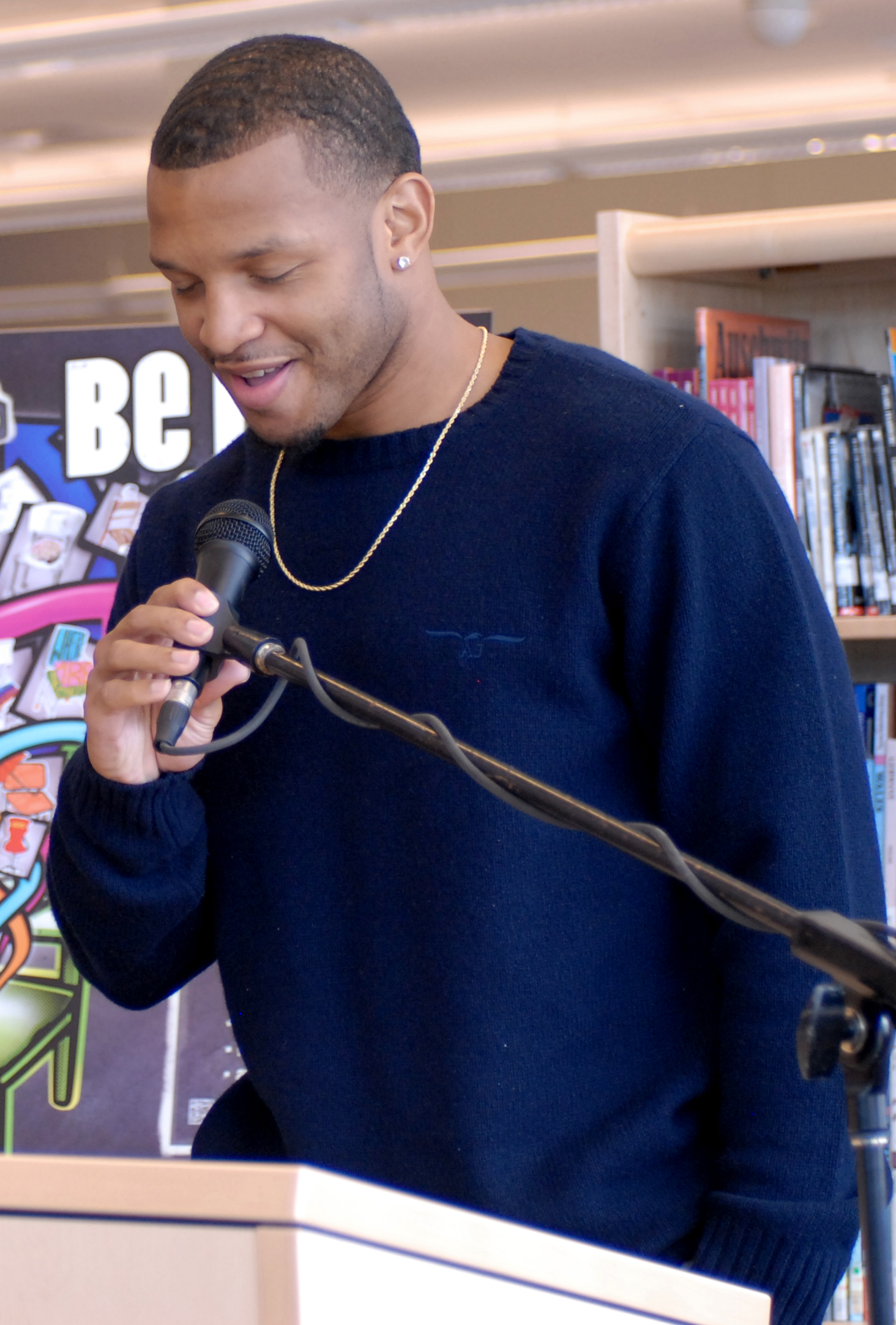

USC Trojans
- Title: Assistant coach
- League: Big Ten Conference

Personal information
- Born: December 8, 1982 (age 43) Portland, Oregon, U.S.
- Listed height: 6 ft 2 in (1.88 m)
- Listed weight: 195 lb (88 kg)

Career information
- High school: Garfield (Seattle, Washington)
- College: Washington (2001–2005)
- NBA draft: 2005: undrafted
- Playing career: 2005–2014
- Position: Point guard
- Number: 5, 10
- Coaching career: 2015–present

Career history

Playing
- 2005–2007: Tulsa 66ers
- 2007: Memphis Grizzlies
- 2007: Los Angeles Clippers
- 2007: Virtus Bologna
- 2007–2008: Olimpia Milano
- 2008–2009: Albuquerque Thunderbirds
- 2009–2010: Rio Grande Valley Vipers
- 2010: Houston Rockets
- 2010: →Rio Grande Valley Vipers
- 2011: Oyak Renault
- 2012: Rio Grande Valley Vipers
- 2012: Minnesota Timberwolves
- 2013–2014: Medi Bayreuth
- 2014: SC Rasta Vechta

Coaching
- 2015–2022: Washington (assistant)
- 2022–2024: Washington (associate head coach)
- 2024–present: USC (assistant)

Career highlights
- All-NBA D-League First Team (2009); 2× All-NBA D-League Second Team (2007, 2010)
- Stats at NBA.com
- Stats at Basketball Reference

William James Conroy (born December 8, 1982) is an American professional basketball coach and former player, currently an assistant coach for the USC Trojans.

== Amateur career ==
Conroy attended and played at Garfield High School in Seattle, and played college basketball at the University of Washington. Conroy is the all-time assists leader in Washington Huskies history, with 515.

== Pro career ==
Conroy played in the 2006–07 NBA preseason with the Charlotte Bobcats, but he was cut before the NBA regular season started. He then signed with the Tulsa 66ers of the NBA D-League. On January 30, 2007, Conroy was signed to a ten-day contract by the Memphis Grizzlies after they had opened up a roster spot by waiving guard Eddie Jones.

After his contract ended, Conroy returned to the 66ers. On February 28, 2007, Conroy was signed to another ten-day contract by the Los Angeles Clippers, following point guard Shaun Livingston's season-ending knee injury. The team waived Von Wafer to make room on their roster for Conroy.

However, after averaging two assists in four games played, he was waived. On April 6, he was re-signed by the Clippers, who made room on their roster by waiving Željko Rebrača. Conroy then played in the Italian league with both Virtus Bologna and Olimpia Milano and in the Euroleague with Virtus Bologna, where he averaged 7.8 points and 3.2 assists per game during the 2007–08 season.

He then played with the NBA D-League clubs the Albuquerque Thunderbirds and the Rio Grande Valley Vipers. In 2009, he tied Morris Almond's D-League single-game record with 53 points, but this was surpassed by Pierre Jackson in 2014 (58). He was called up by the Houston Rockets from the Vipers on January 29, 2010, on a 10-day contract, and returned to the Vipers when the contract expired on February 8. Conroy was again recalled by the Rockets on March 2, 2010, and sent back to the Vipers on March 11, 2010.

In January 2011 he signed with Oyak Renault in Bursa, Turkey. In January 2012, he rejoined the Rio Grande Valley Vipers. In September 2012, Conroy signed with the Minnesota Timberwolves. He was waived on November 15, 2012, after appearing in four games.

Despite being waived, Conroy remained with the Timberwolves that season as a member of their scouting staff. It was reported that he was not retiring from his playing career, but merely putting it on hold.

In December 2013, he signed with Medi Bayreuth. In February 2014 his contract was not extended and he left the team. Instead Conroy decided to sign with the German team SC Rasta Vechta for the remainder of the season.

== Coaching career ==
On June 4, 2015, Conroy was named as an assistant basketball coach at the University of Washington under head coach Lorenzo Romar.

On March 22, 2017, new University of Washington head coach Mike Hopkins announced that Conroy will remain on the coaching staff following the firing of Romar.

On August 17, 2022, Conroy was promoted to associate head coach at the University of Washington.

== Career statistics ==
Legend
GP	Games played	GS	Games started	MPG	Minutes per game
FG%	Field goal percentage	3P%	3-point field goal percentage	FT%	Free throw percentage
RPG	Rebounds per game	APG	Assists per game	SPG	Steals per game
BPG	Blocks per game	PPG	Points per game	**Bold**	Career high

=== NBA ===
==== Regular season ====
Year	Team	GP	GS	MPG	FG%	3P%	FT%	RPG	APG	SPG	BPG	PPG
2006–07	Memphis	3	0	5.7	–	–	–	.7	.3	.0	.0	.0
2006–07	L.A. Clippers	4	0	**8.8**	.000	–	.000	**1.3**	**2.0**	.0	.0	.0
2009–10	Houston	**5**	0	7.2	**.300**	.000	.000	.6	1.4	.0	.0	**1.2**
2012–13	Minnesota	4	0	5.0	.000	.000	**.500**	.3	.0	.0	.0	.3
Career		16	0	6.7	.136	.000	.125	.7	1.0	.0	.0	.4
