= 2006–07 Portland Trail Blazers season =

NBA professional basketball team season

- Head coach: Nate McMillan
- General manager: Steve Patterson (resigned); Tod Leiweke (interim); Kevin Pritchard
- Owner: Paul Allen
- Arena: Rose Garden

Results
- Record: 32–50 (.390)
- Place: Division: 3rd (Northwest); Conference: 12th (Western)
- Playoff finish: Did not qualify
- Stats at Basketball Reference

Local media
- Television: KGW; FSN Northwest
- Radio: KXL

The 2006–07 Portland Trail Blazers season was the team's 37th in the NBA. They began the season hoping to improve upon their 21-61 output from the previous season. They managed to improve by 11 games, finishing 32–50, but they failed to qualify for the playoffs.

== NBA draft ==
Round	Pick	Player	Position	Nationality	College / Club Team
1	2	LaMarcus Aldridge	F	United States	Texas
1	4	Tyrus Thomas (traded to Chicago)	F	United States	LSU
1	6	Brandon Roy	G	United States	Washington
1	30	Joel Freeland	F	United Kingdom	Gran Canaria (Spain)

== Roster ==
Portland Trail Blazers roster
Players

Pos.	No.	Player	Height	Weight	DOB	From
F/C	12	LaMarcus Aldridge	6 ft 11 in (2.11 m)	240 lb (109 kg)		Texas
G	2	Dan Dickau	6 ft 0 in (1.83 m)	190 lb (86 kg)		Gonzaga
G	1	Jarrett Jack	6 ft 3 in (1.91 m)	202 lb (92 kg)		Georgia Tech
G	0	Fred Jones	6 ft 4 in (1.93 m)	210 lb (95 kg)		Oregon
F/C	9	Raef LaFrentz	6 ft 11 in (2.11 m)	240 lb (109 kg)		Kansas
C	21	Jamaal Magloire	6 ft 11 in (2.11 m)	259 lb (117 kg)		Kentucky
F	23	Darius Miles	6 ft 9 in (2.06 m)	210 lb (95 kg)		East St. Louis HS (IL)
F	25	Travis Outlaw	6 ft 9 in (2.06 m)	210 lb (95 kg)		Starkville HS (MS)
C	10	Joel Przybilla	7 ft 1 in (2.16 m)	255 lb (116 kg)		Minnesota
F	50	Zach Randolph	6 ft 9 in (2.06 m)	253 lb (115 kg)		Michigan State
G	11	Sergio Rodríguez	6 ft 3 in (1.91 m)	168 lb (76 kg)		Spain
G	7	Brandon Roy	6 ft 6 in (1.98 m)	215 lb (98 kg)		Washington
C	24	Luke Schenscher	7 ft 1 in (2.16 m)	255 lb (116 kg)		Georgia Tech
F	5	Ime Udoka	6 ft 6 in (1.98 m)	215 lb (98 kg)		Portland State
G/F	8	Martell Webster	6 ft 7 in (2.01 m)	210 lb (95 kg)		Seattle Prep HS (WA)

Coaches
Head coach
- Nate McMillan

Legend
- (DP) Unsigned draft pick
- (FA) Free agent
- (S) Suspended
- Injured

=== Roster notes ===
- Forward Ime Udoka was born in the U.S., but represented Nigeria internationally.
- Forward Darius Miles missed the entire season due to a knee injury

== Regular season ==
=== Season standings ===
Northwest Division	W	L	PCT	GB	Home	Road	Div
y-Utah Jazz	51	31	.634	-	31–10	20–21	10–6
x-Denver Nuggets	45	37	.549	6	23–18	22–19	9–7
Portland Trail Blazers	32	50	.390	19	18–23	14–27	7–9
Minnesota Timberwolves	32	50	.390	19	20–21	12–29	6–10
Seattle SuperSonics	31	51	.378	20	20–21	11–30	8–8

#	Western Conference				
#	Team	W	L	PCT	GB
1	z-Dallas Mavericks	67	15	.817	-
2	y-Phoenix Suns	61	21	.744	6
3	x-San Antonio Spurs	58	24	.707	9
4	y-Utah Jazz	51	31	.622	16
5	x-Houston Rockets	52	30	.634	15
6	x-Denver Nuggets	45	37	.549	22
7	x-Los Angeles Lakers	42	40	.512	25
8	x-Golden State Warriors	42	40	.512	25
9	Los Angeles Clippers	40	42	.488	27
10	New Orleans/Oklahoma City Hornets	39	43	.476	28
11	Sacramento Kings	33	49	.402	34
12	Portland Trail Blazers	32	50	.390	35
13	Minnesota Timberwolves	32	50	.390	35
14	Seattle SuperSonics	31	51	.378	36
15	Memphis Grizzlies	22	60	.268	45

z - clinched division title
y - clinched division title
x - clinched playoff spot

== Player statistics ==
Legend
GP	Games played	GS	Games started	MPG	Minutes per game
FG%	Field-goal percentage	3P%	3-point field-goal percentage	FT%	Free-throw percentage
RPG	Rebounds per game	APG	Assists per game	SPG	Steals per game
BPG	Blocks per game	PPG	Points per game

=== Regular season ===
Portland Trail Blazers statistics
Player	GP	GS	MPG	FG%	3P%	FT%	RPG	APG	SPG	BPG	PPG
LaMarcus Aldridge	63	22	22.1	.503	.000	.722	5.0	.4	.3	1.2	9.0
Dan Dickau	50	3	8.9	.358	.262	.792	.9	1.4	.3	.0	3.3
Juan Dixon	55	1	22.6	.426	.364	.833	1.5	1.5	.9	.1	8.9
Stephen Graham	14	1	11.8	.425	.273	.889	1.5	.4	.3	.1	3.2
Jarrett Jack	79	79	33.6	.454	.350	.871	2.6	5.3	1.1	.1	12.0
Fred Jones	24	3	18.7	.384	.259	.846	1.4	2.2	.8	.2	4.8
Raef LaFrentz	27	9	13.0	.382	.087	.769	2.6	.3	.3	.4	3.7
Jamaal Magloire	81	23	21.0	.504	.	.541	6.1	.4	.3	.8	6.5
Travis Outlaw	67	1	22.9	.434	.270	.790	3.2	.8	.9	1.1	9.6
Joel Przybilla	43	43	16.3	.474	.	.370	3.9	.3	.2	1.6	2.0
Zach Randolph	68	67	35.7	.467	.292	.819	10.1	2.2	.8	.2	23.6
Jeremy Richardson	1	0	1.0	.	.	.	.0	.0	.0	.0	.0
Sergio Rodriguez	67	1	12.9	.423	.282	.808	1.4	3.3	.5	.0	3.7
Brandon Roy	57	55	35.4	.456	.377	.838	4.4	4.0	1.2	.2	16.8
Luke Schenscher	11	0	10.7	.304	.	.714	2.3	.1	.2	.4	1.7
Ime Udoka	75	75	28.6	.461	.406	.742	3.7	1.5	.9	.2	8.4
Martell Webster	82	27	21.5	.396	.364	.705	2.9	.6	.4	.2	7.0

== Awards and records ==
- Brandon Roy, NBA All-Rookie Team 1st Team
- LaMarcus Aldridge, NBA All-Rookie Team 1st Team
