= 2006–07 Los Angeles Lakers season =

NBA professional basketball team season

- Head coach: Phil Jackson
- President: Jim Buss (vice)
- General manager: Mitch Kupchak
- Owner: Jerry Buss
- Arena: Staples Center

Results
- Record: 42–40 (.512)
- Place: Division: 2nd (Pacific); Conference: 7th (Western)
- Playoff finish: First Round (lost to Suns 1–4)
- Stats at Basketball Reference

Local media
- Television: FSN West, KCAL
- Radio: AM 570 KLAC

The 2006–07 Los Angeles Lakers season was the 59th season of the franchise in the National Basketball Association (NBA) and the 61st overall. The season ended with the Lakers being eliminated in five games in a rematch against the Phoenix Suns from the 2006 playoffs (which the Suns won in seven games) in the First Round of the playoffs. It was the first season that Kobe Bryant switched from jersey number 8 to 24.

The Lakers finished in second place in the Pacific Division, 7th seed in the playoffs. Ultimately, even though team captain Bryant was the leading NBA scorer with 31.6 PPG, the Lakers were defeated in five games by the Suns. This was the second consecutive season where the Lakers had their season ended by the Suns.

== Draft picks ==
In the NBA draft, the Lakers, as expected, chose young talent. In the draft, the Lakers selected Jordan Farmar, the PG for UCLA with 26th pick. Los Angeles also traded their 51st pick (Cheick Samb) to the Detroit Pistons for SF Maurice Evans. The Lakers also had a trade with the Dallas Mavericks, trading away a future second round pick for J. R. Pinnock.

Round	Pick	Player	Position	Nationality	School/Club team
1	26	Jordan Farmar	Guard	United States	UCLA
2	51	Cheick Samb	Center	Senegal	WTC Cornellà (Spain)

== Roster ==
2006–07 Los Angeles Lakers roster
Players

Pos.	No.	Player	Height	Weight	DOB	From
C	54	Kwame Brown	6 ft 11 in (2.11 m)	270 lb (122 kg)	1982–03–10	Glynn Academy
SG	24	Kobe Bryant	6 ft 6 in (1.98 m)	220 lb (100 kg)	1978–08–23	LMHS
C	17	Andrew Bynum	7 ft 0 in (2.13 m)	275 lb (125 kg)	1987–10–27	SJHS
PF	43	Brian Cook	6 ft 9 in (2.06 m)	258 lb (117 kg)	1980–12–04	Illinois
SG	6	Maurice Evans	6 ft 5 in (1.96 m)	220 lb (100 kg)	1978–11–08	Texas
PG	5	Jordan Farmar	6 ft 2 in (1.88 m)	180 lb (82 kg)	1986–11–30	UCLA
SF	2	Aaron McKie	6 ft 5 in (1.96 m)	209 lb (95 kg)	1972–10–02	Temple
C	31	Chris Mihm	7 ft 0 in (2.13 m)	265 lb (120 kg)	1979–07–16	Texas
PF	7	Lamar Odom	6 ft 10 in (2.08 m)	230 lb (104 kg)	1979–11–06	Rhode Island
PG	1	Smush Parker	6 ft 4 in (1.93 m)	180 lb (82 kg)	1981–06–01	Fordham
PF	10	Vladimir Radmanović	6 ft 10 in (2.08 m)	234 lb (106 kg)	1980–11–19	Serbia & Montenegro
C	21	Ronny Turiaf	6 ft 10 in (2.08 m)	249 lb (113 kg)	1983–01–13	Gonzaga
SG	18	Sasha Vujačić	6 ft 7 in (2.01 m)	195 lb (88 kg)	1984–03–08	Slovenia
SF	4	Luke Walton	6 ft 8 in (2.03 m)	232 lb (105 kg)	1980–03–28	Arizona
PG	3	Shammond Williams	6 ft 1 in (1.85 m)	201 lb (91 kg)	1975–04–05	North Carolina

Coaches
Head coach
- Phil Jackson
Assistant(s)
- Jim Cleamons
- Frank Hamblen
- Kurt Rambis
- Brian Shaw
- Kareem Abdul-Jabbar

Legend
- (DP) Unsigned draft pick
- (FA) Free agent
- (S) Suspended
- Injured

Roster
Updated: 2007-07-17

=== Injuries and surgeries ===
Besides the signings, L.A.'s most notable move was the injury bug. Kobe Bryant, the reigning scoring champion had successful surgery on his knee and would decline playing for Team USA at the 2006 World Championship, where they finished 3rd, with bronze.

Center Chris Mihm, who was the starting big man before having an ankle injury, also underwent successful surgery and was not expected to play at all in the upcoming season.

== Regular season ==
=== The beginning success ===
The Lakers started their season opener hosting the Phoenix Suns, the team who knocked them out of the playoffs. Kobe Bryant was out, allowing Maurice Evans to play in his place. Centers Kwame Brown and Chris Mihm were out on injury, forcing Bynum in their place.

Even with two of their starters out on injuries, it didn't seem to affect the team, as Odom led the team until Bryant recovered. The next night at Oracle Arena against the Golden State Warriors, Odom had stats, almost recording his first triple-double of the season, 22 points with nine rebounds and nine assists. Ronny Turiaf, known for his sideline celebrations, had career-highs in almost every category, including 23 points and nine rebounds for a 110–98 win. Bryant also sat this out.

=== Going downhill ===
By March, the Lakers were in disarray. Radmanović was fined $500,000 for lying to the organization about his injury, Walton, Brown and Odom were playing on injuries, and despite some 40-point games, Bryant was unable to stop the Lakers fall. Coach Jackson suffered his first seven-game losing streak of his career in result. It seemed impossible for the Lakers to make the playoffs. Bryant decided to step his game up even further.

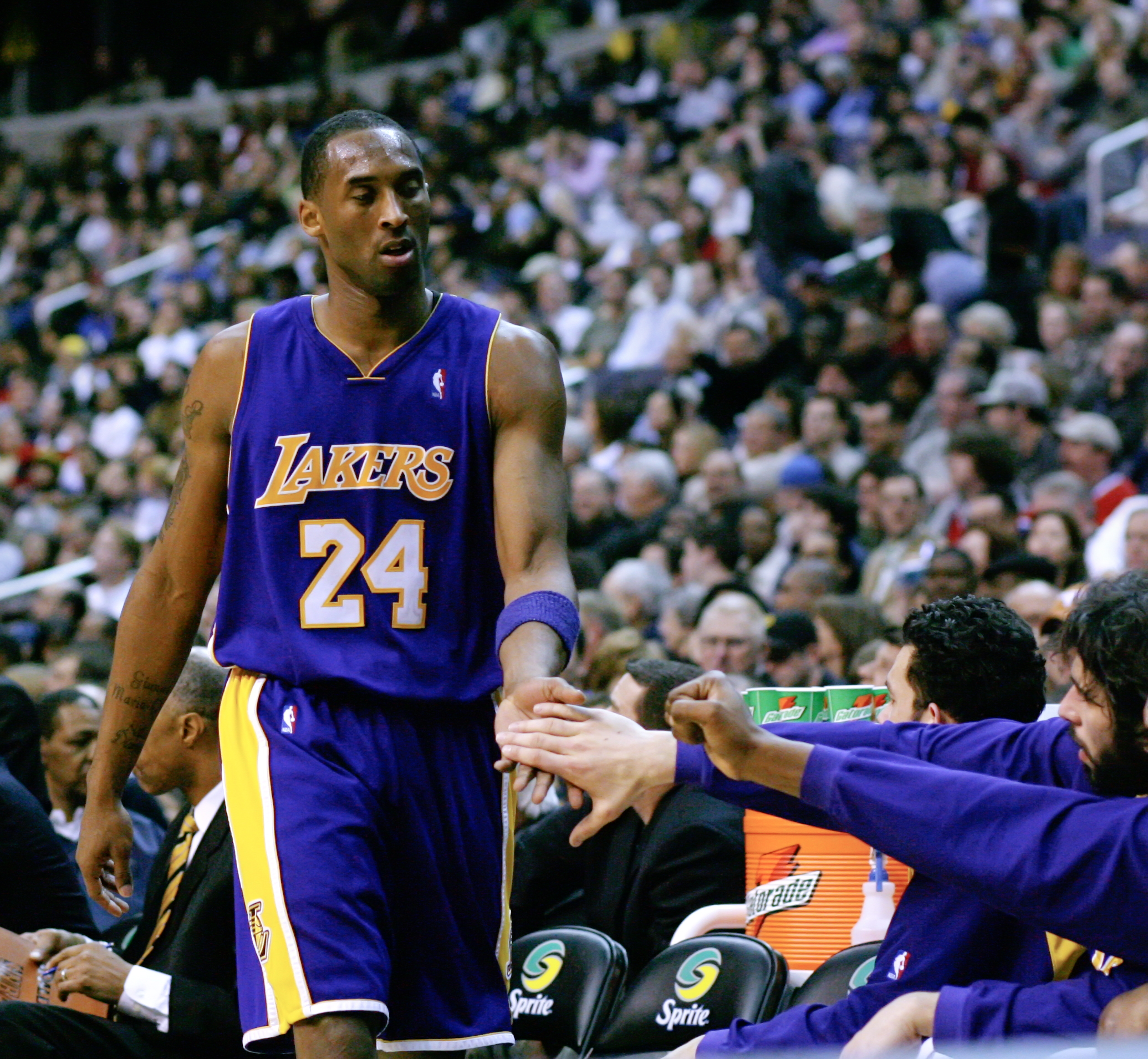
Kobe Bryant scored 65 points against the Trail Blazers on March 16. He also scored 60 points against the Grizzlies on March 22.

In the March 16th game against the Portland Trail Blazers, Bryant recorded his second-highest outbreak of his career with 65 points, single-handedly winning the game after being down by 12 with four minutes in regulation.

He continued by getting 50, 60, and another 50 in games against the Minnesota Timberwolves, Memphis Grizzlies and New Orleans Hornets respectively. By doing so, Bryant recorded the second-longest streak of scoring 50+ points in NBA history behind Wilt Chamberlain. Two days after his game against New Orleans, Kobe ended his streak in a game against the Golden State Warriors in Los Angeles with 43 points. Bryant's high scoring month continued. He scored 53 in an overtime loss against the Houston Rockets two games later.

But Bryant's scoring binge, which led to the team's five-game winning streak, was followed by the aforementioned seven-game losing streak. Throughout the season, the Lakers were 14–6 in games where Bryant scored 40+ points.

=== Season standings ===
Pacific Division	W	L	PCT	GB	Home	Road	Div
y-Phoenix Suns	61	21	.744	-	33–8	28–13	11–5
x-Los Angeles Lakers	42	40	.512	19	25–16	17–24	10–6
x-Golden State Warriors	42	40	.512	19	30–11	12–29	6–10
Los Angeles Clippers	40	42	.488	21	25–16	15–26	8–8
Sacramento Kings	33	49	.402	28	20–21	13–28	5–11

#	Western Conference				
#	Team	W	L	PCT	GB
1	z-Dallas Mavericks	67	15	.817	-
2	y-Phoenix Suns	61	21	.744	6
3	x-San Antonio Spurs	58	24	.707	9
4	y-Utah Jazz	51	31	.622	16
5	x-Houston Rockets	52	30	.634	15
6	x-Denver Nuggets	45	37	.549	22
7	x-Los Angeles Lakers	42	40	.512	25
8	x-Golden State Warriors	42	40	.512	25
9	Los Angeles Clippers	40	42	.488	27
10	New Orleans/Oklahoma City Hornets	39	43	.476	28
11	Sacramento Kings	33	49	.402	34
12	Portland Trail Blazers	32	50	.390	35
13	Minnesota Timberwolves	32	50	.390	35
14	Seattle SuperSonics	31	51	.378	36
15	Memphis Grizzlies	22	60	.268	45

== Game log ==
=== Pre-season ===
2006 preseason game log
Total: 4–4
Preseason

Game	Date	Team	Score	High points	High rebounds	High assists	Location Attendance	Record
1	October 10	Utah	W 94-79	Lamar Odom (18)	Andrew Bynum (6)	Odom & Walton (6)	Save Mart Center (Fresno, CA); 9,713	1–0
2	October 12	Seattle	W 104-101	Brian Cook (16)	Brian Cook (6)	Jordan Farmar (5)	Honda Center (Anaheim, CA); 11,669	2–0
3	October 15	Phoenix	L 91-99	Smush Parker (18)	Ronny Turiaf (10)	Luke Walton (7)	Thomas & Mack Center (Las Vegas, NV); 13,329	2–1
4	October 17	Sacramento	L 91-96	Ronny Turiaf (15)	Brian Cook (9)	Luke Walton (6)	Thomas & Mack Center (Las Vegas, NV); 12,587	2-2
5	October 19	L.A. Clippers	L 90-91	Andrew Bynum (15)	3 players tied (6)	Smush Parker (4)	Staples Center; 14,316	2–3
6	October 20	New Orleans/Oklahoma City	W 113-106	Maurice Evans (27)	Lamar Odom (10)	Lamar Odom (9)	Staples Center; 12,383	3-3
7	October 22	Phoenix	W 94-91	Luke Walton (19)	Bynum & Odom (9)	Jordan Farmar (6)	iPayOne Center (San Diego, CA); 12,111	4–3
8	October 26	Denver	L 108-126	Andrew Bynum (23)	Andrew Bynum (7)	Smush Parker (6)	Honda Center (Anaheim, CA); 13,956	4-4

2006–07 season schedule

=== Regular season ===
2006–07 game log
Total: 42–40 (home: 25–16; road: 17-24)
October: 1–0 (home: 1–0; road: 0–0)

Game	Date	Team	Score	High points	High rebounds	High assists	Location Attendance	Record
1	October 31	Phoenix	W 114-106	Lamar Odom (34)	Lamar Odom (13)	Smush Parker (7)	Staples Center; 18,997	1–0

November: 9–5 (home: 8–2; road: 1–3)

Game	Date	Team	Score	High points	High rebounds	High assists	Location Attendance	Record
2	November 1	@ Golden State	W 110-98	Ronny Turiaf (23)	Odom & Turiaf (9)	Lamar Odom (9)	Oracle Arena; 19,596	2–0
3	November 3	Seattle	W 118-112	Lamar Odom (28)	Bynum & Walton (8)	Bryant & Odom (6)	Staples Center; 18,997	3–0
4	November 5	@ Seattle	L 101-117	Kobe Bryant (15)	Lamar Odom (7)	Kobe Bryant (9)	KeyArena; 17,072	3–1
5	November 7	Minnesota	W 95-88	Andrew Bynum (20)	Andrew Bynum (14)	Kobe Bryant (6)	Staples Center; 18,997	4–1
6	November 8	@ Portland	L 90-101	Kobe Bryant (32)	Bynum & Odom (5)	Luke Walton (4)	Rose Garden; 17,022	4–2
7	November 10	Detroit	L 83-97	Kobe Bryant (19)	Lamar Odom (8)	Lamar Odom (7)	Staples Center; 18,997	4–3
8	November 12	Memphis	W 91-81	Kobe Bryant (21)	Lamar Odom (16)	Lamar Odom (7)	Staples Center; 18,997	5–3
9	November 17	Toronto	W 107-100	Kobe Bryant (31)	Kobe Bryant (11)	Kobe Bryant (7)	Staples Center; 18,997	6–3
10	November 19	Chicago	W 82-72	Lamar Odom (23)	Andrew Bynum (13)	3 players tied (4)	Staples Center; 18,997	7–3
11	November 21	L.A. Clippers	W 105-101	Kobe Bryant (40)	Kwame Brown (14)	Kobe Bryant (5)	Staples Center; 18,997	8–3
12	November 24	@ Utah	L 108-114	Kobe Bryant (27)	Lamar Odom (6)	Smush Parker (4)	EnergySolutions Arena; 19,911	8–4
13	November 26	New Jersey	W 99-93	Lamar Odom (21)	Kwame Brown (9)	Kobe Bryant (10)	Staples Center; 18,997	9–4
14	November 28	Milwaukee	L 105-109	Kobe Bryant (27)	Lamar Odom (13)	Lamar Odom (8)	Staples Center; 18,997	9–5
15	November 30	Utah	W 132-102	Kobe Bryant (52)	Lamar Odom (11)	Lamar Odom (8)	Staples Center; 18,997	10–5

December: 10–6 (home: 5–2; road: 5–4)

Game	Date	Team	Score	High points	High rebounds	High assists	Location Attendance	Record
16	December 2	@ L.A. Clippers	W 97-88	Kobe Bryant (29)	Brown & Odom (8)	Smush Parker (4)	Staples Center; 20,550	11–5
17	December 4	Indiana	W 101-87	Kobe Bryant (21)	Lamar Odom (13)	Luke Walton (7)	Staples Center; 18,997	12–5
18	December 6	New Orleans/Oklahoma City	L 89-105	Kobe Bryant (24)	Kwame Brown (9)	3 players tied (4)	Staples Center; 18,535	12–6
19	December 8	Atlanta	W 106-95	Luke Walton (25)	Lamar Odom (15)	Brown & Odom (7)	Staples Center; 18,997	13–6
20	December 10	San Antonio	W 106-99	Kobe Bryant (34)	Lamar Odom (11)	Lamar Odom (9)	Staples Center; 18,997	14–6
21	December 12	@ Houston	W 102-94	Kobe Bryant (23)	Kobe Bryant (8)	Bryant & Walton (7)	Toyota Center; 18,392	15–6
22	December 13	@ Dallas	L 101-110	Kobe Bryant (33)	Bryant & Walton (7)	Kobe Bryant (4)	American Airlines Center; 20,424	15–7
23	December 15	Houston	W 112-101 (2OT)	Kobe Bryant (53)	Brown & Bryant (10)	Luke Walton (9)	Staples Center; 18,997	16–7
24	December 17	Washington	L 141-147 (OT)	Kobe Bryant (45)	Bryant & Walton (8)	Luke Walton (11)	Staples Center; 18,997	16–8
25	December 19	@ Chicago	L 89-94	Kobe Bryant (19)	Kwame Brown (12)	Luke Walton (7)	United Center; 22,761	16–9
26	December 20	@ Minnesota	W 111-94	Kobe Bryant (24)	Andrew Bynum (9)	Jordan Farmar (7)	Target Center; 16,788	17–9
27	December 22	@ New Jersey	W 99-95	Kobe Bryant (21)	Brian Cook (11)	Kobe Bryant (11)	Continental Airlines Arena; 18,436	18–9
28	December 25	@ Miami	L 85-101	Kobe Bryant (16)	Ronny Turiaf (7)	Bryant & Farmar (4)	American Airlines Arena; 20,283	18–10
29	December 27	@ Orlando	W 106-93	Kobe Bryant (27)	Brown & Cook (6)	Kobe Bryant (7)	Amway Arena; 17,451	19–10
30	December 29	@ Charlotte	L 124-133 (3OT)	Kobe Bryant (58)	Kwame Brown (15)	Luke Walton (5)	Charlotte Bobcats Arena; 19,561	19–11
31	December 31	Philadelphia	W 104-94	Kobe Bryant (35)	Bryant & Brown (8)	Kobe Bryant (6)	Staples Center; 18,997	20–11

January: 8–7 (home: 5–2; road: 3–5)

Game	Date	Team	Score	High points	High rebounds	High assists	Location Attendance	Record
32	January 4	@ Sacramento	W 132-128 (OT)	Kobe Bryant (42)	Andrew Bynum (11)	Kobe Bryant (9)	ARCO Arena; 17,317	21–11
33	January 5	Denver	W 123-104	Smush Parker (23)	Andrew Bynum (10)	Kobe Bryant (10)	Staples Center; 18,997	22–11
34	January 7	Dallas	W 101-98	Kobe Bryant (26)	Bryant & Bynum (8)	Bryant & Walton (6)	Staples Center; 18,997	23–11
35	January 9	@ Memphis	L 118-128	Kobe Bryant (25)	Andrew Bynum (8)	Kobe Bryant (6)	FedEx Forum; 16,651	23–12
36	January 10	@ Houston	L 77-102	Kobe Bryant (20)	Andrew Bynum (11)	Luke Walton (6)	Toyota Center; 18,331	23–13
37	January 12	Orlando	W 109-106	Kobe Bryant (28)	Kobe Bryant (8)	Kobe Bryant (7)	Staples Center; 18,997	24–13
38	January 15	Miami	W 124-118 (OT)	Bryant & Cook (25)	Cook & Walton (10)	Kobe Bryant (8)	Staples Center; 18,997	25–13
39	January 17	@ San Antonio	W 100-96	Kobe Bryant (34)	Andrew Bynum (8)	Kobe Bryant (8)	AT&T Center; 18,797	26–13
40	January 18	@ Dallas	L 95-114	Kobe Bryant (26)	Bynum & Parker (5)	Kobe Bryant (5)	American Airlines Center; 20,446	26–14
41	January 20	@ New Orleans/Oklahoma City	L 103-113	Bryant & Evans (23)	Andrew Bynum (9)	Kobe Bryant (7)	Ford Center; 19,329	26–15
42	January 22	Golden State	W 108-103	Kobe Bryant (42)	Andrew Bynum (15)	Luke Walton (5)	Staples Center; 18,997	27–15
43	January 26	Charlotte	L 97-106 (OT)	Kobe Bryant (32)	Andrew Bynum (16)	Kobe Bryant (5)	Staples Center; 18,997	27–16
44	January 28	San Antonio	L 94-96 (OT)	Kobe Bryant (31)	Andrew Bynum (11)	Kobe Bryant (7)	Staples Center; 18,997	27–17
45	January 30	@ New York	L 94-99	Lamar Odom (25)	Odom & Radmanović (9)	Lamar Odom (6)	Madison Square Garden; 19,763	27–18
46	January 31	@ Boston	W 111-98	Kobe Bryant (43)	Ronny Turiaf (10)	Kobe Bryant (8)	TD Banknorth Garden; 18,624	28–18

February: 5–7 (home: 1–3; road: 4–4)

Game	Date	Team	Score	High points	High rebounds	High assists	Location Attendance	Record
47	February 2	@ Indiana	L 84-95	Kobe Bryant (22)	Lamar Odom (12)	Bryant & Cook (4)	Conseco Fieldhouse; 17,662	28–19
48	February 3	@ Washington	W 118-102	Kobe Bryant (39)	Andrew Bynum (13)	Kobe Bryant (6)	Verizon Center; 20,173	29–19
49	February 5	@ Atlanta	W 90-83	Kobe Bryant (27)	Lamar Odom (18)	Lamar Odom (6)	Philips Arena; 19,600	30–19
50	February 8	@ Detroit	L 78-93	Kobe Bryant (18)	Ronny Turiaf (11)	Kobe Bryant (5)	The Palace of Auburn Hills; 22,076	30–20
51	February 9	@ Toronto	L 92-96	Kobe Bryant (25)	Lamar Odom (12)	Kobe Bryant (5)	Air Canada Centre; 20,012	30–21
52	February 11	@ Cleveland	L 90-99	Kobe Bryant (36)	Lamar Odom (11)	Kobe Bryant (6)	Quicken Loans Arena; 20,562	30–22
53	February 13	New York	L 106-107	Kobe Bryant (31)	Andrew Bynum (11)	Bryant & Odom (4)	Staples Center; 18,997	30–23
54	February 15	Cleveland	L 108-114	Kobe Bryant (34)	Andrew Bynum (9)	Kobe Bryant (5)	Staples Center; 18,997	30–24
All-Star Break
55	February 21	Portland	L 108-112	Kobe Bryant (25)	Kobe Bryant (8)	Smush Parker (8)	Staples Center; 18,997	30–25
56	February 23	Boston	W 122-96	Kobe Bryant (38)	Lamar Odom (8)	Kobe Bryant (9)	Staples Center; 18,997	31–25
57	February 25	@ Golden State	W 102-85	Bryant & Evans (26)	Andrew Bynum (10)	Kobe Bryant (6)	Oracle Arena; 20,107	32–25
58	February 26	@ Utah	W 102-94	Kobe Bryant (35)	Lamar Odom (14)	Lamar Odom (9)	EnergySolutions Arena; 19,911	33–25

March: 5–9 (home: 3–4; road: 2–5)

Game	Date	Team	Score	High points	High rebounds	High assists	Location Attendance	Record
59	March 2	Sacramento	L 108-116	Kobe Bryant (30)	Lamar Odom (13)	Kobe Bryant (10)	Staples Center; 18,997	33–26
60	March 4	@ Phoenix	L 94-99	Kobe Bryant (31)	Brian Cook (14)	Kobe Bryant (6)	US Airways Center; 18,422	33–27
61	March 6	@ Minnesota	L 107-117 (2OT)	Kobe Bryant (40)	Kobe Bryant (13)	Kobe Bryant (8)	Target Center; 15,197	33–28
62	March 7	@ Milwaukee	L 90-110	Maurice Evans (22)	3 players tied (6)	Smush Parker (5)	Bradley Center; 17,886	33–29
63	March 9	@ Philadelphia	L 92-108	Kobe Bryant (30)	Kwame Brown (10)	Bryant & Brown (4)	Wachovia Center; 20,577	33–30
64	March 11	Dallas	L 72-108	Kobe Bryant (25)	Kobe Bryant (9)	Kobe Bryant (3)	Staples Center; 18,997	33–31
65	March 15	@ Denver	L 86-113	Kobe Bryant (25)	Odom & Walton (7)	Kobe Bryant (9)	Pepsi Center; 19,155	33–32
66	March 16	Portland	W 116-111 (OT)	Kobe Bryant (65)	Lamar Odom (9)	Lamar Odom (6)	Staples Center; 18,997	34–32
67	March 18	Minnesota	W 109-102	Kobe Bryant (50)	Lamar Odom (9)	Luke Walton (11)	Staples Center; 18,997	35–32
68	March 22	@ Memphis	W 121-119	Kobe Bryant (60)	Lamar Odom (15)	Smush Parker (7)	FedEx Forum; 16,107	36–32
69	March 23	@ New Orleans/Oklahoma City	W 111-105	Kobe Bryant (50)	Lamar Odom (10)	Luke Walton (8)	New Orleans Arena; 18,535	37–32
70	March 25	Golden State	W 115-113	Kobe Bryant (43)	Lamar Odom (19)	Luke Walton (8)	Staples Center; 18,997	38–32
71	March 27	Memphis	L 86-88	Kobe Bryant (23)	Lamar Odom (16)	Lamar Odom (11)	Staples Center; 18,997	38–33
72	March 30	Houston	L 104-107 (OT)	Kobe Bryant (53)	Lamar Odom (17)	Odom & Parker (4)	Staples Center; 18,997	38–34

April: 4–6 (home: 2–3; road: 2–3)

Game	Date	Team	Score	High points	High rebounds	High assists	Location Attendance	Record
73	April 1	Sacramento	W 126-103	Maurice Evans (21)	Kwame Brown (7)	Kobe Bryant (13)	Staples Center; 18,997	39–34
74	April 3	Denver	L 105-111	Kobe Bryant (39)	Lamar Odom (14)	Lamar Odom (12)	Staples Center; 18,997	39–35
75	April 4	@ L.A. Clippers	L 82-90	Kobe Bryant (29)	Bryant & Bynum (7)	Odom & Walton (5)	Staples Center; 20,161	39–36
76	April 6	@ Seattle	W 112-109	Kobe Bryant (46)	Brian Cook (6)	Lamar Odom (7)	KeyArena; 17,072	40–36
77	April 8	Phoenix	L 107-115	Kobe Bryant (34)	Ronny Turiaf (15)	Kobe Bryant (7)	Staples Center; 18,997	40–37
78	April 9	@ Denver	L 111-115	Kobe Bryant (23)	Andrew Bynum (7)	Kobe Bryant (10)	Pepsi Center; 19,155	40–38
79	April 12	L.A. Clippers	L 110-118	Kobe Bryant (50)	Kobe Bryant (9)	Parker & Walton (8)	Staples Center; 18,997	40–39
80	April 13	@ Phoenix	L 85-93	Luke Walton (19)	Lamar Odom (13)	Luke Walton (5)	US Airways Center; 18,422	40-40
81	April 15	Seattle	W 109-98	Kobe Bryant (50)	Kobe Bryant (8)	Lamar Odom (5)	Staples Center; 18,997	41–40
82	April 18	@ Sacramento	W 117-106	Kobe Bryant (34)	Lamar Odom (13)	Kobe Bryant (6)	ARCO Arena; 17,317	42–40

2006–07 season schedule

=== Playoffs ===
2007 playoff game log
Total: 1–4 (home: 1–1; road: 0–3)
First Round: 1–4 (home: 1–1; road: 0–3)

Game	Date	Team	Score	High points	High rebounds	High assists	Location Attendance	Series
1	April 22	@ Phoenix	L 87–95	Kobe Bryant (39)	Lamar Odom (16)	Luke Walton (6)	US Airways Center; 18,422	0–1
2	April 24	@ Phoenix	L 98–126	Kobe Bryant (15)	Andrew Bynum (12)	Kobe Bryant (5)	US Airways Center; 18,422	0–2
3	April 26	Phoenix	W 95–89	Kobe Bryant (45)	Lamar Odom (16)	Kobe Bryant (6)	Staples Center; 18,997	1–2
4	April 29	Phoenix	L 100–113	Kobe Bryant (31)	Lamar Odom (13)	Kobe Bryant (9)	Staples Center; 18,997	1–3
5	May 2	@ Phoenix	L 110–119	Kobe Bryant (34)	Odom & Turiaf (10)	Farmar & Odom (2)	US Airways Center; 18,422	1–4

2007 schedule

== Player statistics ==
Legend
GP	Games played	GS	Games started	MPG	Minutes per game
FG%	Field-goal percentage	3P%	3-point field-goal percentage	FT%	Free-throw percentage
RPG	Rebounds per game	APG	Assists per game	SPG	Steals per game
BPG	Blocks per game	PPG	Points per game

=== Regular season ===
Player	GP	GS	MPG	FG%	3P%	FT%	RPG	APG	SPG	BPG	PPG
Kwame Brown	41	28	27.6	.591	.000	.440	6.0	1.8	1.0	1.2	8.4
Kobe Bryant	77	77	40.8	.463	.344	.868	5.7	5.4	1.4	.5	31.6
Andrew Bynum	82	53	21.9	.558	.000	.668	5.9	1.1	.1	1.6	7.8
Brian Cook	65	24	15.7	.453	.400	.723	3.3	1.0	.4	.4	6.9
Maurice Evans	76	10	22.8	.432	.361	.787	2.9	1.0	.5	.2	8.4
Jordan Farmar	72	2	15.1	.422	.328	.711	1.7	1.9	.6	.1	4.4
Aaron McKie	10	0	13.1	.647	.	.	1.8	1.3	.4	.0	2.2
Lamar Odom	56	56	39.3	.468	.297	.700	9.8	4.8	.9	.6	15.9
Smush Parker	82	80	30.0	.436	.365	.646	2.5	2.8	1.5	.1	11.1
Vladimir Radmanovic	55	15	17.9	.424	.339	.726	3.3	1.2	.5	.3	6.6
Ronny Turiaf	72	1	15.1	.549	.000	.664	3.6	.9	.2	1.1	5.3
Sasha Vujacic	73	4	12.8	.392	.373	.878	1.5	.9	.6	.0	4.3
Luke Walton	60	60	33.0	.474	.387	.745	5.0	4.3	1.0	.4	11.4
Shammond Williams	30	0	11.5	.407	.400	.667	1.3	1.0	.4	.0	3.1

=== Playoffs ===
Player	GP	GS	MPG	FG%	3P%	FT%	RPG	APG	SPG	BPG	PPG
Kwame Brown	5	5	26.6	.528	.	.556	5.6	.2	.2	.8	8.6
Kobe Bryant	5	5	43.0	.462	.357	.919	5.2	4.4	1.0	.4	32.8
Andrew Bynum	5	0	11.0	.533	.	.400	4.6	.0	.0	.4	4.0
Brian Cook	5	0	10.2	.333	.429	1.000	1.2	.0	.0	.2	3.6
Maurice Evans	5	0	16.4	.385	.385	.	1.6	.6	.4	.0	5.0
Jordan Farmar	5	5	22.8	.429	.200	.857	2.8	1.6	1.2	.2	6.4
Lamar Odom	5	5	38.4	.482	.273	.500	13.0	2.2	.4	1.2	19.4
Smush Parker	5	0	11.8	.154	.167	1.000	1.4	.6	.6	.2	1.8
Ronny Turiaf	4	0	12.0	.357	.	.700	3.0	.3	.5	.3	4.3
Sasha Vujacic	4	0	10.8	.556	.250	.	1.0	.8	.3	.0	2.8
Luke Walton	5	5	25.6	.389	.417	.750	4.2	2.6	1.4	.2	7.2
Shammond Williams	4	0	20.0	.400	.250	.	.8	1.8	.0	.3	4.5

== Awards and records ==
- SG Kobe Bryant
  - All-NBA First Team
  - NBA All-Defensive First Team
  - 2007 NBA All-Star MVP
  - 06-07 NBA scoring champion (31.6 PPG)

== Transactions ==
In their most notable move, L.A. signed three-point specialist PF Vladimir Radmanović to a five year/$31 million contract from cross-town rivals Clippers. Addressing the need for veterans, they also signed PG Shammond Williams for a one-year, $5 million deal. To make ties with existing players, L.A. signed Brian Cook to a 3-year extension.

Devean George, who won three titles with the Lakers in the early 2000s declined FA and signed with the Mavericks, leaving Bryant the remaining player from the glory days.

Most of the signings the Lakers did was sign and cut/trade. Pinnock, Mamadou N'diaye, Marcus Douthit, and Devin Green were all cut before the season started.
