= 2006–07 Los Angeles Clippers season =

NBA professional basketball team season

- Head coach: Mike Dunleavy, Sr.
- Arena: Staples Center

Results
- Record: 40–42 (.488)
- Place: Division: 4th (Pacific); Conference: 9th (Western)
- Playoff finish: Did not qualify
- Stats at Basketball Reference

Local media
- Television: Prime Ticket, KTLA
- Radio: KSPN

The 2006–07 Los Angeles Clippers season was their 37th season in the NBA and their 23rd in Los Angeles.

== Draft picks ==
| Round | Pick | Player | Position | Nationality | College |
|---|---|---|---|---|---|
| 2 | 34 | Paul Davis | PF | United States | Michigan State |
| 2 | 52 | Guillermo Diaz | PG | Puerto Rico | Miami (FL) |

== Roster ==
Los Angeles Clippers roster
Players

| Pos. | No. | Player | Height | Weight | DOB | From |
|---|---|---|---|---|---|---|
| PF | 42 | Elton Brand | 6 ft 8 in (2.03 m) | 254 lb (115 kg) | | Duke |
| PG | 19 | Sam Cassell | 6 ft 3 in (1.91 m) | 185 lb (84 kg) | | Florida State |
| PG | 10 | Will Conroy | 6 ft 2 in (1.88 m) | 195 lb (88 kg) | | Washington |
| F/C | 40 | Paul Davis | 6 ft 11 in (2.11 m) | 270 lb (122 kg) | | Michigan State |
| PG | 3 | Daniel Ewing | 6 ft 3 in (1.91 m) | 185 lb (84 kg) | | Duke |
| PG | 1 | Jason Hart | 6 ft 3 in (1.91 m) | 185 lb (84 kg) | | Syracuse |
| C | 35 | Chris Kaman | 7 ft 0 in (2.13 m) | 265 lb (120 kg) | | Central Michigan |
| PF | 8 | Yaroslav Korolev | 6 ft 9 in (2.06 m) | 203 lb (92 kg) | | Russia |
| PG | 14 | Shaun Livingston | 6 ft 7 in (2.01 m) | 182 lb (83 kg) | | Peoria Central HS (IL) |
| SF | 50 | Corey Maggette | 6 ft 6 in (1.98 m) | 225 lb (102 kg) | | Duke |
| SG | 5 | Cuttino Mobley | 6 ft 4 in (1.93 m) | 215 lb (98 kg) | | Rhode Island |
| SG | 13 | Quinton Ross | 6 ft 6 in (1.98 m) | 193 lb (88 kg) | | SMU |
| SF | 15 | James Singleton | 6 ft 8 in (2.03 m) | 220 lb (100 kg) | | Murray State |
| PF | 2 | Tim Thomas | 6 ft 10 in (2.08 m) | 235 lb (107 kg) | | Villanova |
| F/C | 34 | Aaron Williams | 6 ft 9 in (2.06 m) | 225 lb (102 kg) | | Xavier |

Coaches
Head coach
- Mike Dunleavy (South Carolina)
Assistant(s)
- Jim Eyen (UC Santa Barbara)
- Kim Hughes (Wisconsin)
- Rory White (South Alabama)
- Neal Meyer (San Diego)

Legend
- (DP) Unsigned draft pick
- (FA) Free agent
- (S) Suspended
- Injured

Roster

=== Roster notes ===
- Guard Sam Cassell would later serve as an assistant coach for the franchise from 2014 to 2020.

== Regular season ==
=== Season standings ===
| Pacific Division | W | L | PCT | GB | Home | Road | Div |
|---|---|---|---|---|---|---|---|
| y-Phoenix Suns | 61 | 21 | .744 | - | 33–8 | 28–13 | 11–5 |
| x-Los Angeles Lakers | 42 | 40 | .512 | 19 | 25–16 | 17–24 | 10–6 |
| x-Golden State Warriors | 42 | 40 | .512 | 19 | 30–11 | 12–29 | 6–10 |
| Los Angeles Clippers | 40 | 42 | .488 | 21 | 25–16 | 15–26 | 8–8 |
| Sacramento Kings | 33 | 49 | .402 | 28 | 20–21 | 13–28 | 5–11 |

| # | Western Conference | | | | |
| # | Team | W | L | PCT | GB |
|---|---|---|---|---|---|
| 1 | z-Dallas Mavericks | 67 | 15 | .817 | - |
| 2 | y-Phoenix Suns | 61 | 21 | .744 | 6 |
| 3 | x-San Antonio Spurs | 58 | 24 | .707 | 9 |
| 4 | y-Utah Jazz | 51 | 31 | .622 | 16 |
| 5 | x-Houston Rockets | 52 | 30 | .634 | 15 |
| 6 | x-Denver Nuggets | 45 | 37 | .549 | 22 |
| 7 | x-Los Angeles Lakers | 42 | 40 | .512 | 25 |
| 8 | x-Golden State Warriors | 42 | 40 | .512 | 25 |
| 9 | Los Angeles Clippers | 40 | 42 | .488 | 27 |
| 10 | New Orleans/Oklahoma City Hornets | 39 | 43 | .476 | 28 |
| 11 | Sacramento Kings | 33 | 49 | .402 | 34 |
| 12 | Portland Trail Blazers | 32 | 50 | .390 | 35 |
| 13 | Minnesota Timberwolves | 32 | 50 | .390 | 35 |
| 14 | Seattle SuperSonics | 31 | 51 | .378 | 36 |
| 15 | Memphis Grizzlies | 22 | 60 | .268 | 45 |

== Player statistics ==
Legend
| GP | Games played | GS | Games started | MPG | Minutes per game |
| FG% | Field-goal percentage | 3P% | 3-point field-goal percentage | FT% | Free-throw percentage |
| RPG | Rebounds per game | APG | Assists per game | SPG | Steals per game |
| BPG | Blocks per game | PPG | Points per game |

=== Regular season ===
| Player | GP | GS | MPG | FG% | 3P% | FT% | RPG | APG | SPG | BPG | PPG |
|---|---|---|---|---|---|---|---|---|---|---|---|
| Elton Brand | 80 | 80 | 38.5 | .533 | 1.000 | .761 | 9.3 | 2.9 | 1.0 | 2.2 | 20.5 |
| Sam Cassell | 58 | 30 | 24.3 | .418 | .294 | .879 | 2.9 | 4.7 | .5 | .1 | 12.3 |
| Doug Christie | 7 | 0 | 11.7 | .294 | .167 | .667 | 1.6 | 1.1 | .4 | .1 | 1.9 |
| Will Conroy | 4 | 0 | 8.8 | .000 | . | .000 | 1.3 | 2.0 | .0 | .0 | .0 |
| Paul Davis | 31 | 0 | 5.8 | .423 | . | .700 | 1.4 | .2 | .2 | .2 | 1.6 |
| Daniel Ewing | 61 | 3 | 11.7 | .404 | .318 | .778 | 1.2 | 1.5 | .5 | .1 | 2.9 |
| Jason Hart | 23 | 22 | 32.4 | .438 | .174 | .889 | 3.6 | 4.0 | 1.8 | .0 | 9.0 |
| Luke Jackson | 3 | 0 | 5.3 | .125 | .250 | . | .3 | 1.3 | .0 | .0 | 1.0 |
| Chris Kaman | 75 | 66 | 29.0 | .451 | .000 | .741 | 7.8 | 1.1 | .5 | 1.5 | 10.1 |
| Yaroslav Korolev | 10 | 0 | 4.1 | .250 | .200 | .500 | .3 | .4 | .3 | .0 | 1.2 |
| Shaun Livingston | 54 | 31 | 29.8 | .463 | .313 | .707 | 3.4 | 5.1 | 1.1 | .5 | 9.3 |
| Corey Maggette | 75 | 31 | 30.5 | .454 | .200 | .820 | 5.9 | 2.8 | .9 | .2 | 16.9 |
| Cuttino Mobley | 78 | 73 | 36.4 | .440 | .411 | .837 | 3.4 | 2.5 | 1.2 | .3 | 13.8 |
| Quinton Ross | 81 | 43 | 21.0 | .467 | .200 | .782 | 2.3 | 1.1 | .9 | .4 | 5.2 |
| James Singleton | 53 | 0 | 7.1 | .366 | .214 | .759 | 2.0 | .3 | .3 | .3 | 1.6 |
| Tim Thomas | 76 | 24 | 27.0 | .414 | .382 | .708 | 5.0 | 2.3 | .7 | .4 | 11.0 |
| Von Wafer | 1 | 0 | 1.0 | .000 | .000 | . | .0 | .0 | .0 | .0 | .0 |
| Aaron Williams | 38 | 7 | 9.8 | .547 | .000 | .818 | 2.2 | .2 | .2 | .4 | 2.0 |
| Alvin Williams | 2 | 0 | 5.0 | .000 | .000 | .500 | .5 | 1.5 | 1.0 | .0 | 1.0 |

== Transactions ==
=== Trades ===
No trades occurred for this team.

=== Free agents ===
==== Re-signed ====
| Player | Signed | Contract |
|---|---|---|
| Sam Cassell | July 12, 2006 | Two-year deal |
| Chris Kaman | October 30, 2006 | Five-year extension |

==== Additions ====
| Player | Signed | Former Team |
|---|---|---|
| Tim Thomas | July 13, 2006 | Phoenix Suns |
| Aaron Williams | August 1, 2006 | New Orleans Hornets |
| Luke Jackson | January 8, 2007 | Idaho Stampede (NBDL) |
| Alvin Williams | January 20, 2007 | Toronto Raptors |
| Doug Christie | January 31, 2007 | Dallas Mavericks |
| Von Wafer | February 21, 2007 | Colorado 14ers (NBDL) |
| Will Conroy | February 28, 2007 waived March 5 re-signed April 6 | Tulsa 66ers (NBDL) |
| Jason Hart | March 5, 2007 | Sacramento Kings |

==== Subtractions ====
| Player | Reason Left | New Team |
|---|---|---|
| Walter McCarty | Free Agency, June 1 | Louisville Cardinals (NCAA) (assistant coach) |
| Vladimir Radmanovic | Free Agency, July 13 | Los Angeles Lakers |
| Vin Baker | Free Agency, August 1 | Minnesota Timberwolves |
| Boniface N'Dong | Free Agency, December 1 | Spartak St. Petersburg (VTB United League) |
| Luke Jackson | Contract Expired, January 18 | Toronto Raptors |
| Alvin Williams | Contract Expired, January 30 | Toronto Raptors (assistant coach) |
| Doug Christie | Suspended, February 20 later released | Sacramento Kings (color analyst) |
| Von Wafer | Waived, February 28 | Denver Nuggets |
| Zeljko Rebraca | Waived, April 6 | Pamesa Valencia (Liga ACB) |

== See also ==
- 2006-07 NBA season
