= 2006–07 Houston Rockets season =

- Head coach: Jeff Van Gundy
- General manager: Carroll Dawson
- Owner: Leslie Alexander
- Arena: Toyota Center

Results
- Record: 52–30 (.634)
- Place: Division: 3rd (Southwest); Conference: 5th (Western)
- Playoff finish: First Round (lost to Jazz 3–4)
- Stats at Basketball Reference

Local media
- Television: FSN Houston; KNWS
- Radio: KILT

The 2006–07 Houston Rockets season was the 40th season of the Houston Rockets franchise in the NBA. The team ended the regular season with a 52–30 record and a 3rd-place finish in the Southwest. The Rockets faced the Utah Jazz in the playoffs, losing the series in seven games. The Rockets had the third best team defensive rating in the NBA.

With the playoff loss, the Rockets made the decision to fire head coach Jeff Van Gundy on May 18, 2007. Five days later, former San Diego Rockets (now the Houston Rockets) player Rick Adelman was hired in Van Gundy's position.

Like the previous two seasons, Tracy McGrady and Yao Ming once again were selected to play in the 2007 NBA All-Star Game in Las Vegas. However, McGrady was the only team representative as Yao did not play due to an injury. It was Yao's fifth All-Star appearance and the last of seven All-Star appearances for McGrady as later injuries began to slow him down and eventually limit his playing time.

== Pre-season ==
=== NBA draft ===
Round	Pick	Player	Position	Nationality	School/Club
1	8	Rudy Gay (traded to Memphis)	Forward	United States	Connecticut
2	32	Steve Novak	Forward	United States	Marquette

== Roster ==
2006–07 Houston Rockets roster
Players

Pos.	No.	Player	Height	Weight	DOB	From
PG	12	Rafer Alston	6 ft 2 in (1.88 m)	171 lb (78 kg)	1976-07-24	Fresno State
SF	31	Shane Battier	6 ft 8 in (2.03 m)	220 lb (100 kg)	1978-09-09	Duke
PF	44	Chuck Hayes	6 ft 6 in (1.98 m)	240 lb (109 kg)	1983-06-11	Kentucky
SG	2	Luther Head	6 ft 3 in (1.91 m)	185 lb (84 kg)	1982-11-26	Illinois
PF	5	Juwan Howard	6 ft 9 in (2.06 m)	240 lb (109 kg)	1973-02-07	Michigan
PG	15	John Lucas III	5 ft 11 in (1.80 m)	165 lb (75 kg)	1982-11-21	Oklahoma State
SG	1	Tracy McGrady	6 ft 8 in (2.03 m)	210 lb (95 kg)	1979-05-24	Mt. Zion HS (NC)
C	55	Dikembe Mutombo	7 ft 2 in (2.18 m)	245 lb (111 kg)	1966-06-25	Georgetown
SF	20	Steve Novak	6 ft 10 in (2.08 m)	220 lb (100 kg)	1983-06-13	Marquette
SF	13	Kirk Snyder	6 ft 6 in (1.98 m)	225 lb (102 kg)	1983-06-05	Nevada
SG	10	Vassilis Spanoulis	6 ft 4 in (1.93 m)	195 lb (88 kg)	1982-08-07	Greece
G	3	Bob Sura	6 ft 5 in (1.96 m)	200 lb (91 kg)	1973-03-25	Florida State
C	25	Jake Tsakalidis	7 ft 2 in (2.18 m)	285 lb (129 kg)	1979-06-10	Republic of Georgia
SF	6	Bonzi Wells	6 ft 5 in (1.96 m)	210 lb (95 kg)	1976-09-28	Ball State
C	11	Yao Ming	7 ft 6 in (2.29 m)	310 lb (141 kg)	1980-09-12	China

Coaches
Head coach
- Jeff Van Gundy
Assistant(s)
- Steve Clifford
- Patrick Ewing
- Andy Greer
- Mike Longabardi
- Tom Thibodeau
- Charlie Ward

Legend
- (DP) Unsigned draft pick
- (FA) Free agent
- (S) Suspended
- Injured

Roster
Updated: February 13, 2007

=== Roster notes ===
- Jake Tsakalidis was born in the Republic of Georgia, but he represented Greece internationally.
- Bob Sura missed the entire season with a knee injury.

== Regular season ==
=== Standings ===
Southwest Division	W	L	PCT	GB	Home	Road	Div
z-Dallas Mavericks	67	15	.817	-	36–5	31–10	14–2
x-San Antonio Spurs	58	24	.707	9	31–10	27–14	10–6
x-Houston Rockets	52	30	.634	15	28–13	24–17	8–8
New Orleans/Oklahoma City Hornets	39	43	.476	28	24–17	15–26	6–10
Memphis Grizzlies	22	60	.268	45	14–27	8–33	2–14

#	Western Conference				
#	Team	W	L	PCT	GB
1	z-Dallas Mavericks	67	15	.817	-
2	y-Phoenix Suns	61	21	.744	6
3	x-San Antonio Spurs	58	24	.707	9
4	y-Utah Jazz	51	31	.622	16
5	x-Houston Rockets	52	30	.634	15
6	x-Denver Nuggets	45	37	.549	22
7	x-Los Angeles Lakers	42	40	.512	25
8	x-Golden State Warriors	42	40	.512	25
9	Los Angeles Clippers	40	42	.488	27
10	New Orleans/Oklahoma City Hornets	39	43	.476	28
11	Sacramento Kings	33	49	.402	34
12	Portland Trail Blazers	32	50	.390	35
13	Minnesota Timberwolves	32	50	.390	35
14	Seattle SuperSonics	31	51	.378	36
15	Memphis Grizzlies	22	60	.268	45

== Playoffs ==
2007 playoff game log
First Round: 3–4 (home: 3–1; road: 0–3)

Game	Date	Team	Score	High points	High rebounds	High assists	Location Attendance	Series
1	April 21	Utah	W 84–75	Yao Ming (28)	Yao Ming (13)	Rafer Alston (8)	Toyota Center; 18,195	1–0
2	April 23	Utah	W 98–90	Tracy McGrady (31)	Chuck Hayes (12)	Alston, McGrady (5)	Toyota Center; 18,206	2–0
3	April 26	@ Utah	L 67–81	Yao Ming (26)	Yao Ming (14)	Rafer Alston (5)	EnergySolutions Arena; 19,911	2–1
4	April 28	@ Utah	L 85–98	Yao Ming (20)	Alston, Yao (9)	Rafer Alston (6)	EnergySolutions Arena; 19,911	2–2
5	April 30	Utah	W 96–82	Tracy McGrady (26)	Yao Ming (15)	Tracy McGrady (16)	Toyota Center; 18,314	3–2
6	May 3	@ Utah	L 82–94	Tracy McGrady (26)	Tracy McGrady (10)	Shane Battier (4)	EnergySolutions Arena; 19,911	3–3
7	May 5	Utah	L 99–103	McGrady, Yao (29)	Juwan Howard (7)	Tracy McGrady (13)	Toyota Center; 18,307	3–4

2007 schedule

== Player statistics ==
Legend
GP	Games played	GS	Games started	MPG	Minutes per game
FG%	Field-goal percentage	3P%	3-point field-goal percentage	FT%	Free-throw percentage
RPG	Rebounds per game	APG	Assists per game	SPG	Steals per game
BPG	Blocks per game	PPG	Points per game

=== Regular season ===
Houston Rockets statistics
Player	GP	GS	MPG	FG%	3P%	FT%	RPG	APG	SPG	BPG	PPG
Rafer Alston	82	82	37.1	.375	.363	.734	3.4	5.4	1.6	.1	13.3
Shane Battier	82	82	36.4	.446	.421	.779	4.1	2.1	1.0	.7	10.1
Chuck Hayes	78	43	22.0	.573	.	.618	6.7	.6	.9	.2	5.6
Luther Head	80	10	27.6	.437	.441	.790	3.2	2.4	1.0	.1	10.9
Juwan Howard	80	38	26.5	.465	.	.824	5.9	1.6	.4	.1	9.7
John Lucas III	47	0	8.1	.397	.254	.789	.8	.7	.4	.0	3.3
Tracy McGrady	71	71	35.8	.431	.331	.707	5.3	6.5	1.3	.5	24.6
Yao Ming	48	48	33.8	.516	.000	.862	9.4	2.0	.4	2.0	25.0
Dikembe Mutombo	75	33	17.2	.556	.	.690	6.5	.2	.3	1.0	3.1
Steve Novak	35	1	5.5	.360	.333	1.000	.7	.2	.1	.0	1.5
Scott Padgett	24	0	8.3	.306	.276	.545	1.9	.3	.2	.1	1.8
Kirk Snyder	39	1	14.4	.452	.250	.653	2.1	1.0	.3	.3	4.9
Vassilis Spanoulis	31	0	8.8	.319	.172	.810	.7	.9	.2	.0	2.7
Jake Tsakalidis	13	0	10.2	.409	.	.800	3.1	.2	.1	.1	2.3
Bonzi Wells	28	1	21.1	.411	.143	.561	4.3	1.1	.9	.5	7.8

=== Playoffs ===
Houston Rockets statistics
Player	GP	GS	MPG	FG%	3P%	FT%	RPG	APG	SPG	BPG	PPG
Rafer Alston	7	7	44.1	.338	.320	.769	6.9	5.0	1.9	.4	10.9
Shane Battier	7	7	38.9	.451	.442	.875	2.6	2.1	1.7	1.0	10.3
Chuck Hayes	7	7	28.1	.706	.000	.400	6.4	.4	1.3	.4	3.7
Luther Head	7	0	20.1	.306	.261	.500	2.7	1.1	.4	.3	4.6
Juwan Howard	7	0	22.4	.400	.	.636	4.4	1.0	.7	.0	5.0
John Lucas III	2	0	4.0	.000	.000	.	.0	.0	.5	.0	.0
Tracy McGrady	7	7	40.0	.394	.250	.737	5.9	7.3	.7	.9	25.3
Yao Ming	7	7	37.1	.440	.	.880	10.3	.9	.1	.7	25.1
Dikembe Mutombo	7	0	5.7	1.000	.	1.000	1.6	.1	.0	.4	1.3
Kirk Snyder	3	0	3.0	.333	.000	.	.3	.0	.0	.0	.7
Vassilis Spanoulis	1	0	3.0	.500	.	1.000	1.0	1.0	.0	.0	4.0
Jake Tsakalidis	1	0	3.0	.	.	1.000	4.0	.0	.0	.0	2.0

== Awards ==
- Yao Ming, All-NBA Second Team
- Tracy McGrady, All-NBA Second Team
