= 2006–07 Minnesota Timberwolves season =

NBA professional basketball team season

- Head coach: Dwane Casey (fired 23 January 2007); Randy Wittman
- General manager: Kevin McHale
- Owner: Glen Taylor
- Arena: Target Center

Results
- Record: 32–50 (.390)
- Place: Division: 4th (Northwest); Conference: 13th (Western)
- Playoff finish: Did not qualify
- Stats at Basketball Reference

Local media
- Television: FSN North; KSTC
- Radio: KLCI

The 2006-07 Minnesota Timberwolves season was the team's 18th in the NBA. They began the season hoping to improve upon their 33-49 output from the previous season. However, they came one win shy of tying it, finishing 32-50.

It was Kevin Garnett's final season of his first stint with the Timberwolves as he was traded to the Boston Celtics following the season. He would eventually win a championship with the Celtics in 2008. Garnett returned to Minnesota midway in the 2014-15 season for his second stint. Also following the season, tragedy struck as Eddie Griffin died in an automobile accident on August 17, 2007.

== Draft picks ==
| Round | Pick | Player | Position | Nationality | College |
|---|---|---|---|---|---|
| 1 | 6 | Brandon Roy | SG | United States | Washington |
| 2 | 36 | Craig Smith | PF | United States | Boston College |
| 2 | 37 | Bobby Jones | | United States | Washington |
| 2 | 57 | Loukas Mavrokefalidis | F/C | Greece | |

== Regular season ==
=== Season standings ===
| Northwest Division | W | L | PCT | GB | Home | Road | Div |
|---|---|---|---|---|---|---|---|
| y-Utah Jazz | 51 | 31 | .634 | - | 31–10 | 20–21 | 10–6 |
| x-Denver Nuggets | 45 | 37 | .549 | 6 | 23–18 | 22–19 | 9–7 |
| Portland Trail Blazers | 32 | 50 | .390 | 19 | 18–23 | 14–27 | 7–9 |
| Minnesota Timberwolves | 32 | 50 | .390 | 19 | 20–21 | 12–29 | 6–10 |
| Seattle SuperSonics | 31 | 51 | .378 | 20 | 20–21 | 11–30 | 8–8 |

| # | Western Conference | | | | |
| # | Team | W | L | PCT | GB |
|---|---|---|---|---|---|
| 1 | z-Dallas Mavericks | 67 | 15 | .817 | - |
| 2 | y-Phoenix Suns | 61 | 21 | .744 | 6 |
| 3 | x-San Antonio Spurs | 58 | 24 | .707 | 9 |
| 4 | y-Utah Jazz | 51 | 31 | .622 | 16 |
| 5 | x-Houston Rockets | 52 | 30 | .634 | 15 |
| 6 | x-Denver Nuggets | 45 | 37 | .549 | 22 |
| 7 | x-Los Angeles Lakers | 42 | 40 | .512 | 25 |
| 8 | x-Golden State Warriors | 42 | 40 | .512 | 25 |
| 9 | Los Angeles Clippers | 40 | 42 | .488 | 27 |
| 10 | New Orleans/Oklahoma City Hornets | 39 | 43 | .476 | 28 |
| 11 | Sacramento Kings | 33 | 49 | .402 | 34 |
| 12 | Portland Trail Blazers | 32 | 50 | .390 | 35 |
| 13 | Minnesota Timberwolves | 32 | 50 | .390 | 35 |
| 14 | Seattle SuperSonics | 31 | 51 | .378 | 36 |
| 15 | Memphis Grizzlies | 22 | 60 | .268 | 45 |

== Roster ==
2006–07 Minnesota Timberwolves roster
Players

| Pos. | No. | Player | Height | Weight | DOB | From |
|---|---|---|---|---|---|---|
| C | 30 | Mark Blount | 7 ft 0 in (2.13 m) | 230 lb (104 kg) | 1975-11-30 | Pittsburgh |
| SF | 31 | Ricky Davis | 6 ft 6 in (1.98 m) | 195 lb (88 kg) | 1979-09-23 | Iowa |
| PG | 4 | Randy Foye | 6 ft 4 in (1.93 m) | 213 lb (97 kg) | 1983-09-24 | Villanova |
| PF | 21 | Kevin Garnett | 6 ft 11 in (2.11 m) | 253 lb (115 kg) | 1976-05-19 | Farragut Academy (IL) |
| PF | 41 | Eddie Griffin | 6 ft 10 in (2.08 m) | 220 lb (100 kg) | 1982-05-30 | Seton Hall |
| SG | 23 | Trenton Hassell | 6 ft 5 in (1.96 m) | 200 lb (91 kg) | 1979-03-04 | Austin Peay |
| PG | 16 | Troy Hudson | 6 ft 1 in (1.85 m) | 170 lb (77 kg) | 1976-03-13 | Southern Illinois |
| PG | 13 | Mike James | 6 ft 2 in (1.88 m) | 188 lb (85 kg) | 1975-06-23 | Duquesne |
| SG | 55 | Marko Jarić | 6 ft 7 in (2.01 m) | 224 lb (102 kg) | 1978-10-12 | Serbia |
| C | 35 | Mark Madsen | 6 ft 9 in (2.06 m) | 250 lb (113 kg) | 1976-01-28 | Stanford |
| SG | 1 | Rashad McCants | 6 ft 4 in (1.93 m) | 226 lb (103 kg) | 1984-09-25 | North Carolina |
| PF | 9 | Justin Reed | 6 ft 8 in (2.03 m) | 240 lb (109 kg) | 1982-01-16 | Mississippi |
| PF | 5 | Craig Smith | 6 ft 7 in (2.01 m) | 272 lb (123 kg) | 1983-11-10 | Boston College |
| SG | 6 | Bracey Wright | 6 ft 3 in (1.91 m) | 210 lb (95 kg) | 1984-07-01 | Indiana |

Coaches
Head coach
- Dwane Casey (fired)
- Randy Wittman
Assistant(s)
- Aleksandar Džikić
- Rex Kalamian
- Bob Ociepka
- Vince Taylor
- Gregg Farnam (trainer)

Legend
- (DP) Unsigned draft pick
- (FA) Free agent
- (S) Suspended
- (DL) On assignment to D-League affiliate
- Injured

Roster
Updated: July 13, 2006

=== Roster notes ===
- Forward Eddie Griffin died in a car accident on August 17.

== Player statistics ==
=== Ragular season ===
| Player | POS | GP | GS | MP | REB | AST | STL | BLK | PTS | MPG | RPG | APG | SPG | BPG | PPG |
|---|---|---|---|---|---|---|---|---|---|---|---|---|---|---|---|
| Mark Blount | C | 82 | 81 | 2,544 | 505 | 67 | 43 | 58 | 1,010 | 31.0 | 6.2 | .8 | .5 | .7 | 12.3 |
| Mike James | PG | 82 | 65 | 2,069 | 163 | 297 | 55 | 7 | 828 | 25.2 | 2.0 | 3.6 | .7 | .1 | 10.1 |
| Randy Foye | PG | 82 | 12 | 1,879 | 218 | 232 | 53 | 21 | 832 | 22.9 | 2.7 | 2.8 | .6 | .3 | 10.1 |
| Craig Smith | PF | 82 | 5 | 1,537 | 416 | 49 | 51 | 18 | 608 | 18.7 | 5.1 | .6 | .6 | .2 | 7.4 |
| Ricky Davis | SF | 81 | 81 | 3,021 | 315 | 385 | 80 | 23 | 1,374 | 37.3 | 3.9 | 4.8 | 1.0 | .3 | 17.0 |
| Kevin Garnett | PF | 76 | 76 | 2,995 | 975 | 313 | 89 | 126 | 1,704 | 39.4 | 12.8 | 4.1 | 1.2 | 1.7 | 22.4 |
| Trenton Hassell | SG | 76 | 68 | 2,223 | 243 | 203 | 22 | 26 | 512 | 29.3 | 3.2 | 2.7 | .3 | .3 | 6.7 |
| Marko Jarić | SG | 70 | 13 | 1,555 | 184 | 145 | 75 | 16 | 371 | 22.2 | 2.6 | 2.1 | 1.1 | .2 | 5.3 |
| Mark Madsen | C | 56 | 0 | 473 | 87 | 10 | 10 | 10 | 61 | 8.4 | 1.6 | .2 | .2 | .2 | 1.1 |
| Justin Reed | PF | 41 | 3 | 318 | 46 | 17 | 5 | 3 | 106 | 7.8 | 1.1 | .4 | .1 | .1 | 2.6 |
| Rashad McCants | SG | 37 | 0 | 554 | 47 | 38 | 26 | 7 | 184 | 15.0 | 1.3 | 1.0 | .7 | .2 | 5.0 |
| Troy Hudson | PG | 34 | 6 | 554 | 48 | 73 | 14 | 2 | 202 | 16.3 | 1.4 | 2.1 | .4 | .1 | 5.9 |
| Bracey Wright | SG | 19 | 0 | 190 | 21 | 15 | 9 | 1 | 67 | 10.0 | 1.1 | .8 | .5 | .1 | 3.5 |
| Eddie Griffin | PF | 13 | 0 | 92 | 25 | 4 | 0 | 7 | 18 | 7.1 | 1.9 | .3 | .0 | .5 | 1.4 |

== Awards and records ==
- Kevin Garnett, All-NBA Second Team
- Kevin Garnett, NBA All-Defensive Second Team
- Randy Foye, NBA All-Rookie Team 1st Team
- Craig Smith, NBA All-Rookie Team 2nd Team
