= 2006–07 Sacramento Kings season =

NBA professional basketball team season

- Head coach: Eric Musselman
- President: Geoff Petrie
- General manager: Geoff Petrie
- Owners: Maloof family
- Arena: ARCO Arena

Results
- Record: 33–49 (.402)
- Place: Division: 5th (Pacific); Conference: 11th (Western)
- Playoff finish: Did not qualify

The 2006–07 Sacramento Kings season was the 62nd season of the franchise, its 58th season in the National Basketball Association (NBA), and its 22nd in Sacramento. They began the season hoping to improve upon their 44–38 output from the previous season. However, they came eleven wins shy of tying it, finishing 33–49. They missed the playoffs for the first time since 1998, and marked a downturn in the Kings' history, as it started a long period of futility for the team. From 2007 to 2022, the Kings failed to make the NBA playoffs or have a winning record. The drought would be the longest in NBA history.

== Offseason ==
On July 8, the Kings signed power forward Lou Amundson. Amundson would be waived on October 26.

On July 24, the Kings signed John Salmons and Justin Williams. Salmons would play for Sacramento until 2009, when he was traded to the Chicago Bulls. Williams was waived on October 26, but would sign with the team during the season.

On August 15, the Kings signed center Loren Woods. Woods would be waived on October 24.

On October 3, the Kings signed Maurice Taylor. Taylor would play with the Kings until January 23, when he was waived.

On October 24, the Kings waived Loren Woods.

On October 26, the Kings waived Justin Williams and Lou Amundson.

=== Draft picks ===
Round	Pick	Player	Position	Nationality	College
1	19	Quincy Douby	G	United States	Rutgers

== Roster ==
2006–07 Sacramento Kings roster
Players

Pos.	No.	Player	Height	Weight	DOB	From
F	3	Shareef Abdur-Rahim	6 ft 9 in (2.06 m)	245 lb (111 kg)	1976-12-11	California
F	93	Ron Artest	6 ft 7 in (2.01 m)	260 lb (118 kg)	1979-11-13	St. John's
PG	10	Mike Bibby	6 ft 1 in (1.85 m)	190 lb (86 kg)	1978-05-13	Arizona
PG	8	Quincy Douby	6 ft 3 in (1.91 m)	175 lb (79 kg)	1984-05-16	Rutgers
G/F	32	Francisco García	6 ft 7 in (2.01 m)	195 lb (88 kg)	1981-12-31	Louisville
SG	23	Kevin Martin	6 ft 7 in (2.01 m)	185 lb (84 kg)	1983-02-01	Western Carolina
C	52	Brad Miller	7 ft 0 in (2.13 m)	261 lb (118 kg)	1976-04-12	Purdue
C	20	Vitaly Potapenko	6 ft 10 in (2.08 m)	280 lb (127 kg)	1975-03-21	Wright State
G	7	Ronnie Price	6 ft 2 in (1.88 m)	190 lb (86 kg)	1983-06-21	Utah Valley
G/F	15	John Salmons	6 ft 6 in (1.98 m)	207 lb (94 kg)	1979-12-12	Miami (FL)
F	9	Kenny Thomas	6 ft 7 in (2.01 m)	245 lb (111 kg)	1977-07-25	New Mexico
C	30	Justin Williams	6 ft 10 in (2.08 m)	225 lb (102 kg)	1984-05-12	Wyoming
F	34	Corliss Williamson	6 ft 7 in (2.01 m)	245 lb (111 kg)	1973-12-04	Arkansas

Coaches
Head coach
- Eric Musselman
Assistant(s)
- Scott Brooks
- T. R. Dunn
- Jason Hamm
- Mark Hughes
- Brendan O'Connor

Legend
- (DP) Unsigned draft pick
- (FA) Free agent
- (S) Suspended
- Injured

Roster
Updated: March 1, 2007

== Regular season ==
=== Standings ===
Pacific Division	W	L	PCT	GB	Home	Road	Div
y-Phoenix Suns	61	21	.744	-	33–8	28–13	11–5
x-Los Angeles Lakers	42	40	.512	19	25–16	17–24	10–6
x-Golden State Warriors	42	40	.512	19	30–11	12–29	6–10
Los Angeles Clippers	40	42	.488	21	25–16	15–26	8–8
Sacramento Kings	33	49	.402	28	20–21	13–28	5–11

#	Western Conference				
#	Team	W	L	PCT	GB
1	z-Dallas Mavericks	67	15	.817	-
2	y-Phoenix Suns	61	21	.744	6
3	x-San Antonio Spurs	58	24	.707	9
4	y-Utah Jazz	51	31	.622	16
5	x-Houston Rockets	52	30	.634	15
6	x-Denver Nuggets	45	37	.549	22
7	x-Los Angeles Lakers	42	40	.512	25
8	x-Golden State Warriors	42	40	.512	25
9	Los Angeles Clippers	40	42	.488	27
10	New Orleans/Oklahoma City Hornets	39	43	.476	28
11	Sacramento Kings	33	49	.402	34
12	Portland Trail Blazers	32	50	.390	35
13	Minnesota Timberwolves	32	50	.390	35
14	Seattle SuperSonics	31	51	.378	36
15	Memphis Grizzlies	22	60	.268	45

== Player statistics ==
Legend
GP	Games played	GS	Games started	MPG	Minutes per game
FG%	Field-goal percentage	3P%	3-point field-goal percentage	FT%	Free-throw percentage
RPG	Rebounds per game	APG	Assists per game	SPG	Steals per game
BPG	Blocks per game	PPG	Points per game

=== Regular season ===
Player	GP	GS	MPG	FG%	3P%	FT%	RPG	APG	SPG	BPG	PPG
Shareef Abdur-Rahim	80	45	25.2	.474	.150	.726	5.0	1.4	.7	.5	9.9
Mike Bibby	82	82	34.0	.404	.360	.830	3.2	4.7	1.1	.1	17.1
Quincy Douby	42	0	8.5	.381	.240	.733	.9	.4	.4	.1	2.8
Francisco Garcia	79	5	17.8	.429	.356	.833	2.6	1.1	.6	.5	6.0
Jason Hart	13	0	7.7	.500	.500	.909	1.2	.8	.2	.0	3.3
Kevin Martin	80	80	35.2	.473	.381	.844	4.3	2.2	1.2	.1	20.2
Brad Miller	63	56	28.3	.453	.152	.772	6.4	3.6	.6	.6	9.0
Vitaly Potapenko	3	0	4.3	.000	.	.	.7	.0	.0	.0	.0
Ronnie Price	58	1	9.7	.390	.323	.673	1.2	.8	.5	.1	3.3
John Salmons	79	19	27.0	.456	.357	.779	3.3	3.2	.9	.3	8.5
Maurice Taylor	12	2	8.6	.286	.	.615	2.3	.4	.3	.1	2.0
Kenny Thomas	62	53	22.8	.482	.000	.513	6.1	1.2	.7	.3	5.3
Justin Williams	26	1	12.8	.614	.000	.365	4.4	.1	.2	.6	5.0
Corliss Williamson	68	1	19.7	.510	.000	.715	3.3	.6	.4	.2	9.1
Metta World Peace	70	65	37.7	.440	.358	.740	6.5	3.4	2.1	.6	18.8
