= Jake Tsakalidis =

Greek basketball player (born 1979)

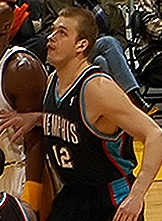
- Tsakalidis with the Memphis Grizzlies in 2003

Personal information
- Born: 10 June 1979 (age 47) Rustavi, Georgian SSR, Soviet Union
- Listed height: 7 ft 2 in (2.18 m)
- Listed weight: 290 lb (132 kg)

Career information
- NBA draft: 2000: 1st round, 25th overall pick
- Drafted by: Phoenix Suns
- Playing career: 1996–2008
- Position: Center
- Number: 25, 12

Career history
- 1996–2000: AEK Athens
- 2000–2003: Phoenix Suns
- 2003–2007: Memphis Grizzlies
- 2007: Houston Rockets
- 2007–2008: Olympiacos

Career highlights
- FIBA Saporta Cup champion (2000); Greek Cup winner (2000)

Career NBA statistics
- Points: 1,497 (4.8 ppg)
- Rebounds: 1,238 (3.9 rpg)
- Blocks: 223 (0.7 bpg)
- Stats at NBA.com
- Stats at Basketball Reference

Iakovos "Jake" Tsakalidis (Greek: Ιάκωβος Τσακαλίδης, Georgian: იაკოვოს წაკალიდას, born 10 June 1979) is a Georgian-born Greek former professional basketball player.

Tsakalidis, a 7 ft 2 in (2.18 m) center, holds dual citizenship in Georgia, where he was born (the Georgian Soviet Socialist Republic at the time), and in Greece, where he was raised.

== Professional career ==
=== Greece ===
Tsakalidis began his professional career in 1996, at the age of 17, with the Greek League club AEK Athens. With AEK, he was a 2-time Greek Cup finalist (1998, 1999), a FIBA Saporta Cup winner (2000), and a Greek Cup winner (2000). In those years with AEK, Tsakalidis played at a great level, especially in the painted zone area, where he complemented his teammates, Michalis Kakiouzis and Dimos Dikoudis, in that area.

In 2000, the Phoenix Suns selected Tsakalidis in the 2000 NBA draft despite a warning faxed from AEK to NBA teams that they would not be letting him out of the four years remaining on his contract. The matter ultimately had to be resolved in the international Court of Arbitration for Sport and Tsakalidis began his NBA career that year with the Suns. He would spend the next 7 seasons playing with various NBA teams. In 2007, he returned to Greece, after leaving the Houston Rockets. He joined the Greek EuroLeague club Olympiacos.

=== NBA ===
Tsakalidis was selected by the Phoenix Suns, in the 1st round (25th overall) of the 2000 NBA draft. On 30 September 2003 Tsakalidis was traded by the Suns, along with teammate Bo Outlaw, to the Memphis Grizzlies, in exchange for Brevin Knight, Robert Archibald, and Cezary Trybański. Following the season, as a restricted free agent, he would sign a three-year, $8.7 million offer sheet with the Cleveland Cavaliers, and the Grizzlies would match to keep Tsakalidis.

He was eventually traded by the Grizzlies to the Houston Rockets, on 13 February 2007, for small forward Scott Padgett. Tsakalidis' final NBA game was played on 28 April 2007 in Game 4 of the Western Conference First Round against the Utah Jazz. This series went to 7 games but Tsakaldis only played in Game 4 where Houston lost 85–98 and he recorded two points and four rebounds.

In his NBA career, he averaged 4.8 points per game and 3.9 rebounds per game.

== National team career ==
Tsakalidis played with the senior men's Greek national basketball team at the 1998 FIBA World Championship, where his team finished in 4th place, at the EuroBasket 1999, where his team finished in 16th place, and at the EuroBasket 2003, where his team finished in 5th place.

== Personal life ==
In 2000, Tsakalidis announced that his real name is Alexey Ledkov and he is not of Caucasus Greek descent as previously believed.

== Career statistics ==
Legend
GP	Games played	GS	Games started	MPG	Minutes per game
FG%	Field-goal percentage	3P%	3-point field-goal percentage	FT%	Free-throw percentage
RPG	Rebounds per game	APG	Assists per game	SPG	Steals per game
BPG	Blocks per game	PPG	Points per game	PIR	Performance index rating
**Bold**	Career high

=== NBA ===
==== Regular season ====
Year	Team	GP	GS	MPG	FG%	3P%	FT%	RPG	APG	SPG	BPG	PPG
2000–01	Phoenix	57	39	16.6	.470	.000	.593	4.2	.3	.2	**1.0**	4.5
2001–02	Phoenix	**67**	**47**	**23.6**	.475	.000	.698	**5.6**	.3	**.3**	**1.0**	**7.3**
2002–03	Phoenix	33	27	16.5	.452	.000	.672	3.7	.4	.2	.5	4.9
2003–04	Memphis	40	28	13.3	.504	.000	.590	3.2	**.5**	.2	.6	4.3
2004–05	Memphis	31	1	9.0	.500	.000	.778	1.8	.3	.1	.5	2.5
2005–06	Memphis	51	19	14.4	**.606**	.000	.655	4.2	.3	**.3**	.6	5.0
2006–07	Memphis	23	7	11.2	.400	.000	.583	2.8	.1	**.3**	.5	2.3
2006–07	Houston	13	0	10.2	.409	.000	**.800**	3.1	.1	**.3**	.5	2.3
**Career**		315	168	15.9	.490	.000	.657	3.9	.3	.2	.7	4.8

=== Playoffs ===
Year	Team	GP	GS	MPG	FG%	3P%	FT%	RPG	APG	SPG	BPG	PPG
2001	Phoenix	**4**	**4**	**18.8**	.375	.000	.000	**7.0**	.0	.0	**1.8**	3.0
2004	Memphis	1	0	3.0	.000	.000	**1.000**	.0	.0	.0	.0	2.0
2006	Memphis	**4**	3	14.9	**.600**	.000	.500	2.8	**.5**	**.3**	.3	**3.3**
2007	Houston	1	0	2.8	.000	.000	**1.000**	4.0	.0	.0	.0	2.0
**Career**		10	7	14.0	.462	.000	.833	4.3	.2	.1	.8	2.9

=== EuroLeague ===
Year	Team	GP	GS	MPG	FG%	3P%	FT%	RPG	APG	SPG	BPG	PPG	PIR
2007–08	Olympiacos	13	4	11.1	.808	.000	.588	2.5	0.2	0.2	0.2	4.0	5.7
