= 2006–07 New Orleans/Oklahoma City Hornets season =

- Head coach: Byron Scott
- General manager: Jeff Bower
- Owner: George Shinn
- Arena: Ford Center (35 games); New Orleans Arena (6 games)

Results
- Record: 39–43 (.476)
- Place: Division: 4th (Southwest); Conference: 10th (Western)
- Playoff finish: Did not qualify
- Stats at Basketball Reference

Local media
- Television: Cox Sports Television; The Cox Channel
- Radio: WTIX; KTOK

The 2006–07 New Orleans/Oklahoma City Hornets season was the team's fifth (Note: At the time, this season was considered the 19th season in franchise history, being viewed as a relocation from Charlotte. In 2014, after this team was rebranded as the Pelicans, the name and the statistical history of the original team was reclaimed by the present day Charlotte Hornets, who had begun play in 2004 as an expansion team known as the Charlotte Bobcats.) in the NBA. The Hornets split their games between the New Orleans Arena and the Ford Center, playing the majority of their schedule in Oklahoma City as they had in the previous season. The Hornets improved by one win, finishing 39–43, but failed to reach the playoffs.

Although the Hornets moved back to New Orleans full-time for the 2007–2008 NBA season, Oklahoma City was not without basketball for long as the Seattle SuperSonics relocated to Oklahoma for the 2008–09 campaign and became known as the Oklahoma City Thunder.

== Draft picks ==
Round	Pick	Player	Position	Nationality	College / Club
1	12	Hilton Armstrong	C/PF	United States	Connecticut
1	15	Cedric Simmons	PF	United States	North Carolina State
2	43	Marcus Vinicius	F	Brazil	São Carlos Clube Basquete

== Roster ==
2006–07 New Orleans Hornets roster
Players

Pos.	No.	Player	Height	Weight	DOB	From
C	12	Hilton Armstrong	6 ft 11 in (2.11 m)	235 lb (107 kg)	1984-11-11	Connecticut
PF	33	Brandon Bass	6 ft 8 in (2.03 m)	250 lb (113 kg)	1985-04-30	LSU
SG	23	Devin Brown	6 ft 5 in (1.96 m)	220 lb (100 kg)	1978-12-30	Texas–San Antonio
SF	45	Rasual Butler	6 ft 7 in (2.01 m)	215 lb (98 kg)	1979-05-23	La Salle
C	6	Tyson Chandler	7 ft 1 in (2.16 m)	240 lb (109 kg)	1982-10-02	Dominguez HS (CA)
SG	8	Bobby Jackson	6 ft 1 in (1.85 m)	185 lb (84 kg)	1973-03-13	Minnesota
PF	44	Marc Jackson	6 ft 10 in (2.08 m)	270 lb (122 kg)	1975-01-16	Temple
PF	43	Linton Johnson	6 ft 8 in (2.03 m)	205 lb (93 kg)	1980-06-13	Tulane
SF	24	Desmond Mason	6 ft 7 in (2.01 m)	224 lb (102 kg)	1977-10-11	Oklahoma State
PG	2	Jannero Pargo	6 ft 1 in (1.85 m)	175 lb (79 kg)	1979-10-22	Arkansas
PG	3	Chris Paul	6 ft 0 in (1.83 m)	175 lb (79 kg)	1985-05-06	Wake Forest
PF	22	Cedric Simmons	6 ft 9 in (2.06 m)	235 lb (107 kg)	1986-01-03	NC State
SF	16	Peja Stojaković (injured)	6 ft 10 in (2.08 m)	220 lb (100 kg)	1977-06-09	Croatia
SF	11	Marquinhos Vieira (DL)	6 ft 8 in (2.03 m)	225 lb (102 kg)	1984-05-31	Brazil
PF	30	David West	6 ft 9 in (2.06 m)	250 lb (113 kg)	1980-08-29	Xavier

Coaches
Head coach
- Byron Scott
Assistant(s)
- Kenny Gattison
- David Miller
- Charlie Parker
- Darrell Walker
- Terry Kofler (trainer)

Legend
- (DP) Unsigned draft pick
- (FA) Free agent
- (S) Suspended
- (DL) On assignment to D-League affiliate
- Injured

Roster
Updated: April 5, 2007

=== Roster Notes ===
- Small forward Peja Stojaković played 13 games (his last game being on November 24, 2006) but missed the rest of the season after dealing with back spasms and undergoing surgery to remove a disc fragment in his lower back.

== Regular season ==
=== Season standings ===
Southwest Division	W	L	PCT	GB	Home	Road	Div
z-Dallas Mavericks	67	15	.817	-	36–5	31–10	14–2
x-San Antonio Spurs	58	24	.707	9	31–10	27–14	10–6
x-Houston Rockets	52	30	.634	15	28–13	24–17	8–8
New Orleans/Oklahoma City Hornets	39	43	.476	28	24–17	15–26	6–10
Memphis Grizzlies	22	60	.268	45	14–27	8–33	2–14

#	Western Conference				
#	Team	W	L	PCT	GB
1	z-Dallas Mavericks	67	15	.817	-
2	y-Phoenix Suns	61	21	.744	6
3	x-San Antonio Spurs	58	24	.707	9
4	y-Utah Jazz	51	31	.622	16
5	x-Houston Rockets	52	30	.634	15
6	x-Denver Nuggets	45	37	.549	22
7	x-Los Angeles Lakers	42	40	.512	25
8	x-Golden State Warriors	42	40	.512	25
9	Los Angeles Clippers	40	42	.488	27
10	New Orleans/Oklahoma City Hornets	39	43	.476	28
11	Sacramento Kings	33	49	.402	34
12	Portland Trail Blazers	32	50	.390	35
13	Minnesota Timberwolves	32	50	.390	35
14	Seattle SuperSonics	31	51	.378	36
15	Memphis Grizzlies	22	60	.268	45

== Game log ==
2006–07 game log
Total: 39–43 (Home: 24–17; Road: 15–26)
November: 8–7 (home: 4–2; road: 4–5)

Game	Date	Team	Score	High points	High rebounds	High assists	Location Attendance	Record
1	November 1	@ Boston	W 91–87	Chris Paul (20)	Tyson Chandler (9)	Chris Paul (10)	TD Banknorth Garden; 18,624	1–0
2	November 3	@ Indiana	W 100–91	David West (20)	Tyson Chandler (15)	Chris Paul (6)	Conseco Fieldhouse; 18,165	2–0
3	November 5	Houston	W 96–90	David West (22)	Tyson Chandler (11)	Chris Paul (16)	New Orleans Arena; 18,202	3–0
4	November 7	Golden State	W 97–93	Chris Paul (22)	Tyson Chandler (14)	Chris Paul (11)	Ford Center; 19,164	4–0
5	November 9	@ Golden State	L 116–121	Chris Paul (34)	Tyson Chandler (11)	Chris Paul (16)	Oracle Arena; 16,927	4–1
6	November 10	@ Portland	L 91–92	Peja Stojaković (21)	David West (13)	Chris Paul (8)	Rose Garden Arena; 14,122	4–2
7	November 12	@ L.A. Clippers	L 76–92	Chris Paul (20)	Tyson Chandler (13)	Chris Paul (3)	Staples Center; 18,273	4–3
8	November 14	Charlotte	W 94–85	Peja Stojaković (42)	Tyson Chandler (15)	Chris Paul (10)	Ford Center; 16,623	5–3
9	November 15	@ Detroit	W 100–99	Chris Paul (20)	Hilton Armstrong (9)	Chris Paul (13)	The Palace of Auburn Hills; 22,076	6–3
10	November 15	@ Minnesota	W 99–96	Chris Paul (35)	Cedric Simmons (9)	Chris Paul (6)	Target Center; 16,151	7–3
11	November 21	Miami	W 101–86	Peja Stojaković (23)	Tyson Chandler (15)	Chris Paul (10)	Ford Center; 19,329	8–3
12	November 22	@ Phoenix	L 83–92	Desmond Mason (21)	Tyson Chandler (16)	Chris Paul (4)	US Airways Center; 18,422	8–4
13	November 24	Minnesota	L 79–86	Chris Paul (18)	Tyson Chandler (10)	Chris Paul (7)	Ford Center; 18,258	8–5
14	November 25	@ Dallas	L 73–85	Jannero Pargo (19)	Hilton Armstrong (8)	Chris Paul (4)	American Airlines Center; 20,315	8–6
15	November 28	Toronto	L 77–94	Chris Paul (16)	Tyson Chandler (17)	Chris Paul (11)	Ford Center; 15,647	8–7

December : 4–11 (home: 3–4; road: 1–7)

Game	Date	Team	Score	High points	High rebounds	High assists	Location Attendance	Record
16	December 1	Chicago	L 108–111	Rasual Butler (33)	Tyson Chandler (17)	Chris Paul (18)	Ford Center; 19,164	8–8
17	December 6	@ L.A. Lakers	W 105–89	Chris Paul (26)	Tyson Chandler (12)	Chris Paul (11)	Staples Center; 18,535	9–8
18	December 8	@ Seattle	L 74–94	Chris Paul (16)	Tyson Chandler (13)	Chris Paul (6)	Key Arena; 15,913	9–9
19	December 9	@ Golden State	L 80–101	Desmond Mason (24)	Jannero Pargo (12)	Jannero Pargo (8)	Oracle Arena; 17,105	9–10
20	December 11	Cleveland	W 95–89	Chris Paul (30)	Tyson Chandler (10)	Chris Paul (11)	Ford Center; 19,164	10–10
21	December 14	San Antonio	L 77–103	Rasual Butler (17)	Desmond Mason (9)	Chris Paul (12)	New Orleans Arena; 15,140	10–11
22	December 16	Dallas	L 79–90	Chris Paul (30)	Chris Paul (12)	Chris Paul (8)	New Orleans Arena; 16,331	10–12
23	December 18	@ Miami	L 99–101	Chris Paul (26)	Tyson Chandler & Rasual Butler (8)	Chris Paul (8)	American Airlines Arena; 19,600	10–13
24	December 20	@ Orlando	L 83–86	Chris Paul (19)	Tyson Chandler (11)	Chris Paul (10)	Amway Arena; 17,020	10–14
25	December 22	Memphis	W 100–97 (OT)	Marc Jackson (19)	Tyson Chandler (17)	Chris Paul (14)	Ford Center; 18,097	11–14
26	December 23	San Antonio	L 77–112	Chris Paul (20)	Tyson Chandler (9)	Chris Paul & Devin Brown (3)	Ford Center; 19,164	11–15
27	December 26	@ Seattle	L 94–102	Jannero Pargo (23)	Tyson Chandler (11)	Chris Paul (7)	Key Arena; 15,319	11–16
28	December 27	@ Portland	L 80–101	Desmond Mason (16)	Desmond Mason & Tyson Chandler (7)	Jannero Pargo (5)	Rose Garden Arena; 13,905	11–17
29	December 29	Denver	W 99–89	Rasual Butler (20)	Devin Brown (10)	Devin Brown (7)	Ford Center; 19,334	12–17
30	December 30	@ Dallas	L 80–94	Marc Jackson (24)	Devin Brown (10)	Jannero Pargo (5)	American Airlines Center; 20,433	12–18

January : 7–8 (home: 6–5; road: 1–3)

Game	Date	Team	Score	High points	High rebounds	High assists	Location Attendance	Record
31	January 2	Golden State	L 89–97	Rasual Butler (30)	Tyson Chandler (15)	Jannero Pargo (8)	Ford Center; 16,617	12–19
32	January 4	Detroit	L 68–92	Jannero Pargo (16)	Tyson Chandler (16)	Jannero Pargo (6)	Ford Center; 18,079	12–20
33	January 6	Indiana	L 93–100	Desmond Mason (28)	Tyson Chandler (10)	Jannero Pargo (6)	Ford Center; 17,422	12–21
34	January 8	L.A. Clippers	L 90–100	Desmond Mason (28)	Tyson Chandler (10)	Devin Brown (7)	Ford Center; 15,501	12–22
35	January 10	@ Atlanta	W 96–77	Jannero Pargo (24)	Tyson Chandler (9)	Jannero Pargo (7)	Philips Arena; 10,120	13–22
36	January 12	Washington	W 104–97	Desmond Mason (22)	Tyson Chandler (10)	Devin Brown (9)	Ford Center; 16,899	14–22
37	January 16	Orlando	W 84–78 (OT)	Jannero Pargo (25)	Rasual Butler (11)	Four Players (2)	Ford Center; 17,610	15–22
38	January 19	@ San Antonio	L 86–99	David West (19)	David West (11)	David West & Jannero Pargo (3)	AT&T Center; 17,153	15–23
39	January 20	L.A. Lakers	W 113–103	David West (26)	David West (12)	Devin Brown (6)	Ford Center; 19,329	16–23
40	January 23	@ Philadelphia	L 96–102	Devin Brown (24)	David West (11)	Devin Brown (4)	Wachovia Center; 12,328	16–24
41	January 24	@ Toronto	L 88–90	Rasual Butler (30)	David West (11)	Bobby Jackson (6)	Air Canada Centre; 14,173	16–25
42	January 26	Sacramento	W 88–84	Desmond Mason (24)	Tyson Chandler (12)	Bobby Jackson (7)	New Orleans Arena; 16,607	17–25
43	January 27	Utah	W 94–83	Bobby Jackson (21)	Tyson Chandler (15)	Devin Brown (6)	Ford Center; 18,774	18–25
44	January 29	Portland	W 103–91	David West (21)	Tyson Chandler (16)	David West (4)	Ford Center; 17,745	19–25
45	January 31	Philadelphia	L 83–94	Devin Brown (17)	Tyson Chandler (15)	Bobby Jackson (4)	Ford Center; 16,956	19–26

February : 9–4 (home: 6–0; road: 3–4)

Game	Date	Team	Score	High points	High rebounds	High assists	Location Attendance	Record
46	February 2	Minnesota	W 90–83	Chris Paul (24)	Tyson Chandler (18)	Chris Paul (8)	Ford Center; 18,032	20–26
47	February 3	@ Houston	W 87–74	Devin Brown (18)	Tyson Chandler (12)	Chris Paul (9)	Toyota Center; 18,081	21–26
48	February 5	@ Sacramento	L 99–105	Chris Paul (24)	Tyson Chandler (13)	Chris Paul (6)	ARCO Arena; 17,317	21–27
49	February 7	@ Denver	114–112 (OT)	Desmond Mason (23)	Tyson Chandler (16)	Chris Paul (7)	Pepsi Center; 15,298	22–27
50	February 8	Milwaukee	W 109–101 (2OT)	Desmond Mason (24)	Tyson Chandler (22)	Chris Paul (10)	Ford Center; 17,364	23–27
51	February 10	Memphis	W 114–99	Chris Paul (23)	Tyson Chandler (16)	Chris Paul (11)	Ford Center; 17,139	24–27
52	February 13	@ Memphis	L 104–108	Desmond Mason (23)	Tyson Chandler (23)	Chris Paul (10)	FedEx Forum; 10,641	24–28
53	February 14	Sacramento	W 110–93	Desmond Mason (18)	Tyson Chandler (15)	Chris Paul (6)	Ford Center; 16,753	25–28
54	February 20	@ Charlotte	L 100–104	Chris Paul (20)	Tyson Chandler (20)	Chris Paul (7)	Charlotte Bobcats Arena; 13,007	25–29
55	February 21	@ New Jersey	W 111–107	David West (32)	Tyson Chandler (12)	Chris Paul (11)	Continental Airlines Arena; 15,751	26–29
56	February 23	Seattle	W 98–97	David West (23)	Tyson Chandler (19)	Chris Paul (8)	New Orleans Arena; 17,961	27–29
57	February 27	@ Cleveland	L 89–97	David West (25)	David West (10)	David West (6)	Quicken Loans Arena; 19,619	27–30
58	February 28	Atlanta	W 107–100	Chris Paul (24)	David West (14)	Chris Paul (13)	Ford Center; 17,402	28–30

March : 5–10 (home: 3–4; road: 2–6)

Game	Date	Team	Score	High points	High rebounds	High assists	Location Attendance	Record
59	March 2	@ Chicago	L 93–104	Chris Paul (16)	Tyson Chandler (13)	Chris Paul (6)	United Center; 22,056	28–31
60	March 4	Utah	L 94–108	Tyson Chandler (20)	Tyson Chandler (19)	Chris Paul (13)	Ford Center; 17,304	28–32
61	March 6	@ Denver	L 91–106	Tyson Chandler (15)	Tyson Chandler (18)	Chris Paul (14)	Pepsi Center; 16,409	28–33
62	March 9	@ Phoenix	L 103–104	David West (19)	Tyson Chandler (11)	David West (4)	US Airways Center; 18,422	28–34
63	March 10	@ Utah	L 86–96	Jannero Pargo (15)	David West (10)	Chris Paul (11)	EnergySolutions Arena; 19,911	28–35
63	March 13	New Jersey	L 108–112	Chris Paul (25)	Tyson Chandler (11)	Chris Paul (12)	Ford Center; 16,451	28–36
65	March 16	@ New York	W 92–90	Chris Paul (20)	David West (12)	Chris Paul (8)	Madison Square Garden; 19,763	29–36
66	March 17	@ Washington	L 103–125	Chris Paul (21)	Tyson Chandler (10)	Chris Paul (8)	Verizon Center; 20,713	29–37
67	March 19	Boston	W 106–88	Rasual Butler (18)	Tyson Chandler (11)	Chris Paul (6)	Ford Center; 19,164	30–37
68	March 20	@ Memphis	W 114–103	David West (26)	Tyson Chandler (11)	Chris Paul (9)	FedEx Forum; 10,916	31–37
69	March 23	L.A. Lakers	L 105–111	Chris Paul (28)	Tyson Chandler (22)	Chris Paul (12)	New Orleans Arena; 18,535	31–38
70	March 25	Houston	W 106–94	Chris Paul (28)	Tyson Chandler (10)	Chris Paul (5)	Ford Center; 19,164	32–38
71	March 27	Dallas	L 89–105	Jannero Pargo (23)	Tyson Chandler (8)	Chris Paul (3)	Ford Center; 19,164	32–39
72	March 28	@ San Antonio	L 88–92	Chris Paul (20)	Tyson Chandler (12)	Chris Paul (9)	AT&T Center; 18,334	32–40
73	March 28	New York	W 103–94 (OT)	David West (20)	Tyson Chandler (13)	Chris Paul (6)	Ford Center; 18,521	33–40

April : 6–3 (home: 2–2; road: 4–1)

Game	Date	Team	Score	High points	High rebounds	High assists	Location Attendance	Record
74	April 3	@ Milwaukee	W 119–101	David West (24)	Tyson Chandler (20)	Chris Paul (14)	Bradley Center; 16,031	34–40
75	April 4	Seattle	W 101–92 (OT)	David West (18)	David West (14)	Chris Paul (9)	Ford Center; 17,021	35–40
76	April 6	Phoenix	L 95–103	David West (17)	Devin Brown (7)	Devin Brown (6)	Ford Center; 19,164	35–41
77	April 7	@ Minnesota	L 95–103	Chris Paul (18)	Marc Jackson (11)	Chris Paul (10)	Target Center; 15,907	36–41
78	April 10	L.A. Clippers	W 103–100 (OT)	David West (33)	Devin Brown (9)	Chris Paul (10)	Ford Center; 17,704	37–41
79	April 13	Denver	L 105–107	David West (31)	David West (14)	Chris Paul (8)	Ford Center; 19,164	37–42
80	April 14	@ Houston	L 112–123	David West (33)	Chris Paul (8)	Chris Paul (15)	Toyota Center; 18,238	37–43
81	April 16	@ Sacramento	W 125–118	David West (25)	Hilton Armstrong (7)	Chris Paul (12)	ARCO Arena; 17,317	38–43
82	April 18	@ L.A. Clippers	W 86–83	David West (32)	David West (9)	Chris Paul (10)	Staples Center; 18,392	39–43

2006–07 season schedule

== Player statistics ==
Legend
GP	Games played	GS	Games started	MPG	Minutes per game
FG%	Field-goal percentage	3P%	3-point field-goal percentage	FT%	Free-throw percentage
RPG	Rebounds per game	APG	Assists per game	SPG	Steals per game
BPG	Blocks per game	PPG	Points per game

=== Regular season ===
Player	GP	GS	MPG	FG%	3P%	FT%	RPG	APG	SPG	BPG	PPG
Hilton Armstrong	56	5	11.3	.544	.	.597	2.7	.2	.2	.5	3.1
Brandon Bass	21	3	7.7	.341	.000	.750	2.0	.1	.1	.1	2.0
Devin Brown	58	49	28.7	.420	.357	.794	4.3	2.6	.8	.2	11.6
Rasual Butler	81	38	27.4	.398	.369	.644	3.2	.8	.5	.7	10.1
Tyson Chandler	73	73	34.6	.624	.000	.527	12.4	.9	.5	1.8	9.5
Bobby Jackson	56	2	23.8	.394	.327	.774	3.2	2.5	.9	.1	10.6
Marc Jackson	56	25	18.3	.410	.000	.874	3.4	1.0	.4	.1	7.3
Linton Johnson	54	0	13.3	.489	.333	.811	3.0	.3	.6	.3	4.2
Desmond Mason	75	75	34.3	.452	.	.663	4.6	1.5	.7	.3	13.7
Jannero Pargo	82	7	20.9	.409	.388	.852	2.2	2.5	.6	.0	9.2
Chris Paul	64	64	36.8	.437	.350	.818	4.4	8.9	1.8	.0	17.3
Cedric Simmons	43	4	12.4	.417	.	.485	2.5	.3	.2	.5	2.9
Peja Stojakovic	13	13	32.7	.423	.405	.816	4.2	.8	.6	.3	17.8
Marcus Vinicius	13	0	7.9	.467	.429	.714	.8	.4	.2	.1	1.7
David West	52	52	36.5	.476	.320	.824	8.2	2.2	.8	.7	18.3
