= 2006–07 Memphis Grizzlies season =

- Head coach: Mike Fratello (fired); Tony Barone
- President: Jerry West
- General manager: Jerry West
- Owner: Michael Heisley
- Arena: FedEx Forum

Results
- Record: 22–60 (.268)
- Place: Division: 5th (Southwest); Conference: 15th (Western)
- Playoff finish: Did not qualify
- Stats at Basketball Reference

Local media
- Television: FSN South; SportSouth
- Radio: WREC

The 2006-07 Memphis Grizzlies season was the team's 12th in the NBA. They began the season hoping to improve upon their 49-33 output from the previous season. However, they came up 27 games shy, finishing 22–60, and failed to qualify for the playoffs for the first time in four seasons. The Grizzlies had the worst team defensive rating in the NBA.

Mike Fratello was fired in December after a 6–24 start. He was later replaced by Tony Barone.

Team captain Pau Gasol missed the first half of the season after suffering a foot injury during the FIBA Basketball World Cup.

== Draft picks ==
Round	Pick	Player	Position	Nationality	School
1	24	Kyle Lowry	PG	United States	Villanova

== Roster ==
2006–07 Memphis Grizzlies roster
Players

Pos.	No.	Player	Height	Weight	DOB	From
PG	3	Chucky Atkins	5 ft 11 in (1.80 m)	185 lb (84 kg)	1974-08-14	South Florida
PF	35	Brian Cardinal	6 ft 8 in (2.03 m)	245 lb (111 kg)	1977-05-02	Purdue
SG	5	Will Conroy	6 ft 2 in (1.88 m)	195 lb (88 kg)	1982-12-08	Washington
C	16	Pau Gasol	7 ft 0 in (2.13 m)	250 lb (113 kg)	1980-07-06	Spain
SF	22	Rudy Gay	6 ft 8 in (2.03 m)	250 lb (113 kg)	1986-08-17	Connecticut
PG	10	Junior Harrington	6 ft 4 in (1.93 m)	180 lb (82 kg)	1980-10-02	Wingate
PF	32	Alexander Johnson	6 ft 9 in (2.06 m)	240 lb (109 kg)	1983-02-08	Florida State
SG	30	Dahntay Jones	6 ft 6 in (1.98 m)	225 lb (102 kg)	1980-12-27	Duke
SG	6	Eddie Jones	6 ft 6 in (1.98 m)	200 lb (91 kg)	1971-10-20	Temple
SG	7	Tarence Kinsey	6 ft 6 in (1.98 m)	185 lb (84 kg)	1984-03-21	South Carolina
PG	1	Kyle Lowry	6 ft 0 in (1.83 m)	196 lb (89 kg)	1986-03-25	Villanova
SG	33	Mike Miller	6 ft 8 in (2.03 m)	218 lb (99 kg)	1980-02-19	Florida
PF	44	Lawrence Roberts	6 ft 9 in (2.06 m)	240 lb (109 kg)	1982-10-20	Mississippi State
PG	20	Damon Stoudamire	5 ft 10 in (1.78 m)	171 lb (78 kg)	1973-09-03	Arizona
C	4	Stromile Swift	6 ft 9 in (2.06 m)	225 lb (102 kg)	1979-11-21	LSU
C	12	Jake Tsakalidis	7 ft 2 in (2.18 m)	285 lb (129 kg)	1979-06-10	Republic of Georgia
PF	21	Hakim Warrick	6 ft 9 in (2.06 m)	219 lb (99 kg)	1982-07-08	Syracuse

Coaches
Head coach
- Mike Fratello (fired)
- Tony Barone
Assistant(s)
- Mitchell Anderson
- Paul Cormier
- Lionel Hollins
- Eric Musselman

Legend
- (DP) Unsigned draft pick
- (FA) Free agent
- (S) Suspended
- Injured

Roster
Updated: April 4, 2007

== Regular season ==
=== Season standings ===
Southwest Division	W	L	PCT	GB	Home	Road	Div
z-Dallas Mavericks	67	15	.817	-	36–5	31–10	14–2
x-San Antonio Spurs	58	24	.707	9	31–10	27–14	10–6
x-Houston Rockets	52	30	.634	15	28–13	24–17	8–8
New Orleans/Oklahoma City Hornets	39	43	.476	28	24–17	15–26	6–10
Memphis Grizzlies	22	60	.268	45	14–27	8–33	2–14

#	Western Conference				
#	Team	W	L	PCT	GB
1	z-Dallas Mavericks	67	15	.817	-
2	y-Phoenix Suns	61	21	.744	6
3	x-San Antonio Spurs	58	24	.707	9
4	y-Utah Jazz	51	31	.622	16
5	x-Houston Rockets	52	30	.634	15
6	x-Denver Nuggets	45	37	.549	22
7	x-Los Angeles Lakers	42	40	.512	25
8	x-Golden State Warriors	42	40	.512	25
9	Los Angeles Clippers	40	42	.488	27
10	New Orleans/Oklahoma City Hornets	39	43	.476	28
11	Sacramento Kings	33	49	.402	34
12	Portland Trail Blazers	32	50	.390	35
13	Minnesota Timberwolves	32	50	.390	35
14	Seattle SuperSonics	31	51	.378	36
15	Memphis Grizzlies	22	60	.268	45

== Player statistics ==
=== Ragular season ===
Player	POS	GP	GS	MP	REB	AST	STL	BLK	PTS	MPG	RPG	APG	SPG	BPG	PPG
Hakim Warrick	PF	82	43	2,152	420	75	43	30	1,045	26.2	5.1	.9	.5	.4	12.7
Rudy Gay	SF	78	43	2,103	348	100	71	74	846	27.0	4.5	1.3	.9	.9	10.8
Dahntay Jones	SG	78	25	1,671	153	68	39	22	583	21.4	2.0	.9	.5	.3	7.5
Chucky Atkins	PG	75	23	2,064	139	346	50	4	988	27.5	1.9	4.6	.7	.1	13.2
Mike Miller	SG	70	69	2,740	378	298	54	18	1,293	39.1	5.4	4.3	.8	.3	18.5
Damon Stoudamire	PG	62	51	1,501	139	299	47	2	467	24.2	2.2	4.8	.8	.0	7.5
Pau Gasol	C	59	59	2,133	581	201	29	126	1,226	36.2	9.8	3.4	.5	2.1	20.8
Alexander Johnson	PF	59	19	753	181	17	25	35	260	12.8	3.1	.3	.4	.6	4.4
Stromile Swift	C	54	18	1,029	250	17	30	62	419	19.1	4.6	.3	.6	1.1	7.8
Lawrence Roberts	PF	54	18	969	261	30	36	13	283	17.9	4.8	.6	.7	.2	5.2
Tarence Kinsey	SG	48	12	967	97	41	53	1	369	20.1	2.0	.9	1.1	.0	7.7
Eddie Jones^{†}	SG	29	14	561	61	33	22	2	161	19.3	2.1	1.1	.8	.1	5.6
Lorinza Harrington	PG	29	8	543	68	89	21	5	152	18.7	2.3	3.1	.7	.2	5.2
Brian Cardinal	PF	28	1	313	59	31	22	1	127	11.2	2.1	1.1	.8	.0	4.5
Jake Tsakalidis^{†}	C	23	7	258	64	2	7	11	54	11.2	2.8	.1	.3	.5	2.3
Kyle Lowry	PG	10	0	175	31	32	14	1	56	17.5	3.1	3.2	1.4	.1	5.6
Scott Padgett^{†}	PF	7	0	33	9	0	1	0	2	4.7	1.3	.0	.1	.0	.3
Will Conroy^{†}	SG	3	0	17	2	1	0	0	0	5.7	.7	.3	.0	.0	.0

- ^{†} Denotes player spent time with another team in the season. Stats reflect time with the Grizzlies only.

== Awards and records ==
- Rudy Gay, NBA All-Rookie Team 1st Team
