= 2006–07 Utah Jazz season =

NBA professional basketball team season

- Division champions
- Head coach: Jerry Sloan
- Arena: EnergySolutions Arena

Results
- Record: 51–31 (.622)
- Place: Division: 1st (Northwest); Conference: 4th (Western)
- Playoff finish: Western Conference Finals (lost to Spurs 1–4)
- Stats at Basketball Reference

Local media
- Television: KJZZ-TV; FSN Rocky Mountain
- Radio: KFNZ/KBEE

The 2006-07 Utah Jazz season was the team's 33rd in the NBA. They began the season hoping to improve upon their 41-41 output from the previous season.

They managed to improve by 10 games, finishing 51–31, and qualifying for the playoffs. The Jazz met the Houston Rockets in the first round, and defeated them in seven games. Then, they met the Golden State Warriors, who just came off a stunning upset in the First Round, in which they defeated the first-seeded Dallas Mavericks in six games in the Semifinals, but the Jazz swiftly dispatched the Warriors in five games, moving on to the Western Conference finals for the first time since 1998, when they last made the NBA Finals. However, their playoff run ended with a defeat to the eventual champion San Antonio Spurs in five games. The Spurs would go on to win their fourth NBA Championship after sweeping the Cleveland Cavaliers in that year's NBA Finals. Their Western Conference Finals trip made this the most successful recent Jazz season as of 2026.

== Draft picks ==
| Round | Pick | Player | Position | Nationality | College |
|---|---|---|---|---|---|
| 1 | 14 | Ronnie Brewer | | United States | Arkansas |
| 2 | 46 | Dee Brown | | United States | Illinois |
| 2 | 47 | Paul Millsap | | United States | Louisiana Tech |

== Roster ==
Utah Jazz roster
Players

| Pos. | No. | Player | Height | Weight | DOB | From |
|---|---|---|---|---|---|---|
| C | 55 | Rafael Araújo | 6 ft 11 in (2.11 m) | 280 lb (127 kg) | | BYU |
| PF | 5 | Carlos Boozer | 6 ft 9 in (2.06 m) | 258 lb (117 kg) | | Duke |
| G | 9 | Ronnie Brewer | 6 ft 7 in (2.01 m) | 218 lb (99 kg) | | Arkansas |
| PG | 11 | Dee Brown | 6 ft 0 in (1.83 m) | 185 lb (84 kg) | | Illinois |
| PF | 31 | Jarron Collins | 6 ft 11 in (2.11 m) | 248 lb (112 kg) | | Stanford |
| PG | 2 | Derek Fisher | 6 ft 1 in (1.85 m) | 200 lb (91 kg) | | Little Rock |
| SG | 10 | Gordan Giriček | 6 ft 7 in (2.01 m) | 225 lb (102 kg) | | Croatia |
| SF | 15 | Matt Harpring | 6 ft 7 in (2.01 m) | 230 lb (104 kg) | | Georgia Tech |
| SF | 47 | Andrei Kirilenko | 6 ft 9 in (2.06 m) | 235 lb (107 kg) | | Russia |
| SF | 34 | C. J. Miles | 6 ft 6 in (1.98 m) | 231 lb (105 kg) | | Skyline (HS) |
| PF | 24 | Paul Millsap | 6 ft 8 in (2.03 m) | 258 lb (117 kg) | | Louisiana Tech |
| C | 13 | Mehmet Okur | 6 ft 11 in (2.11 m) | 290 lb (132 kg) | | Turkey |
| PG | 8 | Deron Williams | 6 ft 3 in (1.91 m) | 210 lb (95 kg) | | Illinois |

Coaches
Head coach
- Jerry Sloan
Assistant(s)
- Tyrone Corbin (DePaul)
- Phil Johnson (Utah State)
- Scott Layden (St. Francis (PA))
- Mark McKown (player development)

Legend
- (DP) Unsigned draft pick
- (FA) Free agent
- (S) Suspended
- Injured

Roster

== Regular season ==
=== Season standings ===
| Northwest Division | W | L | PCT | GB | Home | Road | Div |
|---|---|---|---|---|---|---|---|
| y-Utah Jazz | 51 | 31 | .634 | - | 31–10 | 20–21 | 10–6 |
| x-Denver Nuggets | 45 | 37 | .549 | 6 | 23–18 | 22–19 | 9–7 |
| Portland Trail Blazers | 32 | 50 | .390 | 19 | 18–23 | 14–27 | 7–9 |
| Minnesota Timberwolves | 32 | 50 | .390 | 19 | 20–21 | 12–29 | 6–10 |
| Seattle SuperSonics | 31 | 51 | .378 | 20 | 20–21 | 11–30 | 8–8 |

| # | Western Conference | | | | |
| # | Team | W | L | PCT | GB |
|---|---|---|---|---|---|
| 1 | z-Dallas Mavericks | 67 | 15 | .817 | - |
| 2 | y-Phoenix Suns | 61 | 21 | .744 | 6 |
| 3 | x-San Antonio Spurs | 58 | 24 | .707 | 9 |
| 4 | y-Utah Jazz | 51 | 31 | .622 | 16 |
| 5 | x-Houston Rockets | 52 | 30 | .634 | 15 |
| 6 | x-Denver Nuggets | 45 | 37 | .549 | 22 |
| 7 | x-Los Angeles Lakers | 42 | 40 | .512 | 25 |
| 8 | x-Golden State Warriors | 42 | 40 | .512 | 25 |
| 9 | Los Angeles Clippers | 40 | 42 | .488 | 27 |
| 10 | New Orleans/Oklahoma City Hornets | 39 | 43 | .476 | 28 |
| 11 | Sacramento Kings | 33 | 49 | .402 | 34 |
| 12 | Portland Trail Blazers | 32 | 50 | .390 | 35 |
| 13 | Minnesota Timberwolves | 32 | 50 | .390 | 35 |
| 14 | Seattle SuperSonics | 31 | 51 | .378 | 36 |
| 15 | Memphis Grizzlies | 22 | 60 | .268 | 45 |

== Playoffs ==
2007 playoff game log
First Round: 4–3 (home: 3–0; road: 1–3)

| Game | Date | Team | Score | High points | High rebounds | High assists | Location Attendance | Series |
|---|---|---|---|---|---|---|---|---|
| 1 | April 21 | @ Houston | L 75–84 | Williams, Fisher (15) | Carlos Boozer (12) | Deron Williams (9) | Toyota Center; 18,195 | 0–1 |
| 2 | April 23 | @ Houston | L 90–98 | Carlos Boozer (41) | Carlos Boozer (12) | Deron Williams (7) | Toyota Center; 18,206 | 0–2 |
| 3 | April 26 | Houston | W 81–67 | Carlos Boozer (22) | Carlos Boozer (12) | Deron Williams (8) | EnergySolutions Arena; 19,911 | 1–2 |
| 4 | April 28 | Houston | W 98–85 | Deron Williams (25) | Carlos Boozer (10) | Deron Williams (7) | EnergySolutions Arena; 19,911 | 2–2 |
| 5 | April 30 | @ Houston | L 92–96 | Carlos Boozer (26) | Mehmet Okur (9) | Deron Williams (6) | Toyota Center; 18,314 | 2–3 |
| 6 | May 3 | Houston | W 94–82 | Carlos Boozer (22) | Okur, Boozer (9) | Deron Williams (8) | EnergySolutions Arena; 19,911 | 3–3 |
| 7 | May 5 | @ Houston | W 103–99 | Carlos Boozer (35) | Carlos Boozer (14) | Deron Williams (14) | Toyota Center; 18,307 | 4–3 |

Conference Semifinals: 4–1 (home: 3–0; road: 1–1)

| Game | Date | Team | Score | High points | High rebounds | High assists | Location Attendance | Series |
|---|---|---|---|---|---|---|---|---|
| 1 | May 7 | Golden State | W 116–112 | Deron Williams (31) | Carlos Boozer (20) | Deron Williams (8) | EnergySolutions Arena; 19,911 | 1–0 |
| 2 | May 9 | Golden State | W 127–117 (OT) | Carlos Boozer (30) | Mehmet Okur (18) | Deron Williams (14) | EnergySolutions Arena; 19,911 | 2–0 |
| 3 | May 11 | @ Golden State | L 105–125 | Carlos Boozer (19) | Carlos Boozer (11) | Deron Williams (6) | Oracle Arena; 20,655 | 2–1 |
| 4 | May 13 | @ Golden State | W 115–101 | Carlos Boozer (34) | Carlos Boozer (12) | Deron Williams (13) | Oracle Arena; 20,679 | 3–1 |
| 5 | May 15 | Golden State | W 100–87 | Boozer, Kirilenko (21) | Carlos Boozer (14) | Deron Williams (7) | EnergySolutions Arena; 19,911 | 4–1 |

Conference Finals: 1–4 (home: 1–1; road: 0–3)

| Game | Date | Team | Score | High points | High rebounds | High assists | Location Attendance | Series |
|---|---|---|---|---|---|---|---|---|
| 1 | May 20 | @ San Antonio | L 100–108 | Deron Williams (34) | Carlos Boozer (12) | Deron Williams (9) | AT&T Center; 18,300 | 0–1 |
| 2 | May 22 | @ San Antonio | L 96–105 | Carlos Boozer (33) | Carlos Boozer (15) | Deron Williams (10) | AT&T Center; 18,797 | 0–2 |
| 3 | May 26 | San Antonio | W 109–83 | Deron Williams (31) | Carlos Boozer (12) | Deron Williams (8) | EnergySolutions Arena; 19,911 | 1–2 |
| 4 | May 28 | San Antonio | L 79–91 | Deron Williams (27) | Carlos Boozer (9) | Deron Williams (10) | EnergySolutions Arena; 19,911 | 1–3 |
| 5 | May 30 | @ San Antonio | L 84–109 | Andrei Kirilenko (13) | Carlos Boozer (12) | Carlos Boozer (4) | AT&T Center; 18,797 | 1–4 |

2007 schedule

== Player statistics ==
Legend
| GP | Games played | GS | Games started | MPG | Minutes per game |
| FG% | Field-goal percentage | 3P% | 3-point field-goal percentage | FT% | Free-throw percentage |
| RPG | Rebounds per game | APG | Assists per game | SPG | Steals per game |
| BPG | Blocks per game | PPG | Points per game |

=== Regular season ===
| Player | GP | GS | MPG | FG% | 3P% | FT% | RPG | APG | SPG | BPG | PPG |
|---|---|---|---|---|---|---|---|---|---|---|---|
| Lou Amundson | 1 | 0 | 2.0 | . | . | . | .0 | .0 | .0 | .0 | .0 |
| Rafael Araujo | 28 | 0 | 8.9 | .415 | . | .621 | 2.4 | .4 | .2 | .1 | 2.6 |
| Carlos Boozer | 74 | 74 | 34.6 | .561 | . | .685 | 11.7 | 3.0 | .9 | .3 | 20.9 |
| Ronnie Brewer | 56 | 14 | 12.1 | .528 | .000 | .675 | 1.3 | .4 | .7 | .1 | 4.6 |
| Dee Brown | 49 | 0 | 9.2 | .327 | .214 | .649 | .8 | 1.7 | .4 | .1 | 1.9 |
| Jarron Collins | 82 | 9 | 11.1 | .441 | . | .651 | 2.1 | .7 | .2 | .1 | 2.5 |
| Derek Fisher | 82 | 61 | 27.9 | .382 | .308 | .853 | 1.8 | 3.3 | 1.0 | .1 | 10.1 |
| Gordan Giricek | 61 | 6 | 19.5 | .462 | .426 | .816 | 2.1 | 1.0 | .5 | .1 | 7.8 |
| Matt Harpring | 77 | 2 | 25.5 | .491 | .333 | .767 | 4.6 | 1.3 | .7 | .1 | 11.6 |
| Andrei Kirilenko | 70 | 70 | 29.3 | .471 | .213 | .728 | 4.7 | 2.9 | 1.1 | 2.1 | 8.3 |
| C. J. Miles | 37 | 13 | 10.1 | .345 | .219 | .609 | .9 | .7 | .3 | .1 | 2.7 |
| Paul Millsap | 82 | 1 | 18.0 | .525 | .333 | .673 | 5.2 | .8 | .8 | .9 | 6.8 |
| Mehmet Okur | 80 | 80 | 33.3 | .462 | .384 | .765 | 7.2 | 2.0 | .5 | .5 | 17.6 |
| Roger Powell | 3 | 0 | 4.3 | .000 | .000 | 1.000 | 1.0 | .0 | .0 | .0 | .7 |
| Deron Williams | 80 | 80 | 36.9 | .456 | .322 | .767 | 3.3 | 9.3 | 1.0 | .2 | 16.2 |

=== Playoffs ===
| Player | GP | GS | MPG | FG% | 3P% | FT% | RPG | APG | SPG | BPG | PPG |
|---|---|---|---|---|---|---|---|---|---|---|---|
| Rafael Araujo | 5 | 0 | 5.6 | .375 | . | .417 | 2.2 | .2 | .2 | .0 | 2.2 |
| Carlos Boozer | 17 | 17 | 38.5 | .536 | . | .738 | 12.2 | 2.9 | 1.0 | .3 | 23.5 |
| Ronnie Brewer | 8 | 0 | 5.1 | .600 | . | .538 | .8 | .3 | .1 | .0 | 2.4 |
| Dee Brown | 8 | 0 | 6.5 | .353 | .000 | .250 | .4 | 1.1 | .0 | .0 | 1.6 |
| Jarron Collins | 13 | 0 | 8.5 | .333 | . | .529 | 1.5 | .4 | .3 | .0 | 1.2 |
| Derek Fisher | 16 | 14 | 27.8 | .405 | .375 | .933 | 1.6 | 2.6 | 1.0 | .1 | 9.5 |
| Gordan Giricek | 17 | 3 | 18.1 | .418 | .538 | .875 | 1.6 | 1.0 | .2 | .1 | 6.1 |
| Matt Harpring | 17 | 0 | 25.5 | .456 | .000 | .723 | 4.8 | 1.4 | .4 | .2 | 9.3 |
| Andrei Kirilenko | 17 | 17 | 31.0 | .447 | .333 | .785 | 5.2 | 2.6 | .9 | 2.4 | 9.6 |
| C. J. Miles | 1 | 0 | 10.1 | . | . | .500 | .0 | .0 | .0 | .0 | 1.0 |
| Paul Millsap | 17 | 0 | 15.5 | .525 | .000 | .667 | 4.4 | .5 | .6 | .5 | 5.9 |
| Mehmet Okur | 17 | 17 | 34.4 | .388 | .316 | .786 | 7.8 | 1.8 | 1.4 | .9 | 11.8 |
| Deron Williams | 17 | 17 | 38.6 | .452 | .333 | .790 | 4.3 | 8.6 | 1.5 | .2 | 19.2 |

== Awards and records ==
- Paul Millsap, NBA All-Rookie Team 2nd Team
