= History of the Dallas Mavericks =

The Dallas Mavericks (also known as the Mavs) are a professional basketball team based in Dallas, Texas, US, belonging to the National Basketball Association (NBA). In their history, the Mavericks have won one NBA championship, five division titles, and three conference championships.

== History ==
=== 1979–1981: Beginnings ===
In 1979, businessman Don Carter and partner Norm Sonju requested the right to bring an NBA franchise to Dallas. The last professional basketball team in Dallas had been the Dallas Chaparrals of the American Basketball Association, which moved to San Antonio in 1973 to become the San Antonio Spurs.

At the 1980 NBA All-Star Game, league owners voted to admit the new team, with the team's name coming from the 1957–1962 television western Maverick. The name was chosen by the fans with 4600 postcards received beating Wranglers and Express. James Garner, who played the namesake character, was a member of the ownership group. There was some controversy at the time since the University of Texas at Arlington also uses the Mavericks nickname. The Dallas Mavericks joined the Midwest Division of the Western Conference, where they would stay until the league went to six divisions for the 2004–05 season. Dick Motta, who had guided the Washington Bullets to the NBA Championship in 1977–78, was hired as the team's first head coach. He had a well-earned reputation of being a stern disciplinarian, but was also a great teacher of the game.

Kiki Vandeweghe of UCLA was drafted by the Mavs with the 11th pick of the 1980 NBA draft, but Vandeweghe refused to play for the expansion Mavericks and staged a holdout that lasted a month into the team's inaugural season. Vandeweghe was traded to the Denver Nuggets, along with a first-round pick in 1981, in exchange for two future first-round picks that eventually materialized into Rolando Blackman in 1981 and Sam Vincent in 1985.

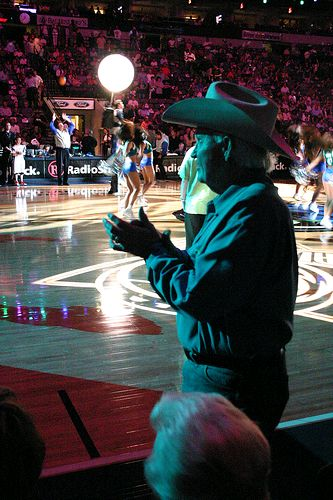
Mavs' founder Don Carter.

In the Mavericks' debut game, taking place in the brand-new Reunion Arena, the Mavericks stunned the Spurs, 103–92. But the Mavs started the season with a discouraging 6–40 record on their way to finishing 15–67. However, the Mavericks did make a player acquisition that, while it seemed minor at the time, turned out to play an important role in the early years of their franchise. Journeyman guard Brad Davis, who played for the Anchorage Northern Knights of the Continental Basketball Association, was tracked down and signed by the Mavs in December. At the time, there was absolutely no reason to expect that Davis would be any better than the expansion-level talent the Mavs had. But he started the Mavs' final 26 games, led the team in assists, and his career soared. He spent the next twelve years with the Mavericks, and eventually his no. 15 jersey was retired.

The 1981 NBA draft brought three players who would become vital parts of the team. The Mavs selected forward Mark Aguirre with the first pick, guard Rolando Blackman ninth, and forward Jay Vincent 24th. By the end of his seven-year Mavs career, Aguirre would average 24.6 points per game. Blackman contributed 19.2 points over his 11-year career in Dallas. But it was Jay Vincent who made the biggest difference for the Mavs in their second season, leading the team in scoring with 21.4 points per game and earning NBA All-Rookie Team honors. The Mavericks improved to 28–54, getting out of the Midwest Division cellar as they finished on top of the Utah Jazz.

=== 1982–1985: Rise to power ===
In 1982–83, the Mavericks were serious contenders for the first time. At the All-Star break, they were 25–24 and had won 12 of their last 15 games. They could not sustain this momentum, and finishing seven games behind the Denver Nuggets for the sixth and final playoff spot in the Western Conference. But the Mavs' 38–44 record signified a 10-game improvement from the previous season, and the fact that a third-year expansion team had even been in playoff contention at all was quite remarkable.

Mark Aguirre led the 1982–83 Mavericks with 24.4 points per game, finishing sixth in the NBA. Jay Vincent and Rolando Blackman contributed 18.7 and 17.7 points per game, respectively. Brad Davis was 10th in the NBA in assists with 7.2 per game, and shot .845 from the line, sixth in the league. Derek Harper was drafted by the Mavs with the 11th pick of the 1983 NBA draft. The guard would spend the next decade with the organization, averaging 15 points and 6.1 assists. The Mavericks' hard work paid off in 1983–84 as they posted a winning record for the first time in franchise history, finishing 43–39 and second in the Midwest Division. The Mavs also earned the first playoff berth in franchise history. Mark Aguirre was named the team's first NBA All-Star, as he finished with an average of 29.5 points per game—second in the league only to Utah's Adrian Dantley.

Dallas finished with the fourth seed in the Western Conference playoffs, and their first playoff trip was modestly successful as they defeated the Seattle SuperSonics in five games. The fifth and deciding game of that series was played at Moody Coliseum, as Reunion Arena, then the home court for the Mavericks, was hosting a tennis tournament. The Magic Johnson-led Los Angeles Lakers were next for the Mavs, and the young club fell short, losing in five games. But a trade the Mavericks made in their inaugural season of 1980 paid off for them in 1984, because they owned Cleveland's first-round pick, which ended up being the fourth pick overall. The Mavs used it to select forward/center Sam Perkins, a former North Carolina Tar Heel with surprising range from the three-point line who would average 14.4 points and 8.0 rebounds in six seasons with Dallas.

About this time, the Dallas Cowboys, once one of the NFL's elite teams, began a slow decline that eventually saw them fall to 1–15 in 1989. The Mavs were hitting their stride at about the same time, and replaced the Cowboys as the Metroplex's favorite team. The 1984–85 team finished a game better than the previous year at 44–38. Mark Aguirre led the team in scoring again with 25.7 points per game, Sam Perkins made the All-Rookie team, and Rolando Blackman represented the Mavericks in the 1985 NBA All-Star Game. The Mavs returned to the playoffs in 1985, but were not as successful as they had been the previous year. They won Game 1 in double-overtime against the Portland Trail Blazers in their first-round playoff series, but lost the next three games in a row, ending their season

=== 1985–1988: A true contender ===
Dallas had the eighth pick in the 1985 NBA draft—again due to a trade with the Cavaliers—and drafted German-born forward Detlef Schrempf out of Washington. He would show flashes of brilliance in his three-plus seasons with the team, but it was not until he was traded to the Indiana Pacers that he displayed his full potential. The Mavericks also traded center Kurt Nimphius to the Los Angeles Clippers for center James Donaldson, who would play for the Mavericks until halfway through the 1991–92 season. This allowed the Mavericks to have the steady hand at center that had been lacking throughout the franchise's first five years. In 1988, James Donaldson would represent the only All-Star center in Dallas Maverick history.

Rolando Blackman represented the Mavericks in the 1986 NBA All-Star Game, hosted by Dallas at Reunion Arena. The 1985–86 Mavericks were second in scoring at 115.3 points per game, gaining them their third straight playoff appearance. They defeated Utah 3–1 in the first round. In the conference semi-finals, they ran into the Lakers again, and L.A. defeated Dallas in six games. But four of those games were decided by four points or less, and Dallas won half of those, leaving Mavericks fans room to hope that they could finally top the Lakers in the following season. The Mavs drafted Michigan center Roy Tarpley with the seventh overall pick, who would go on to become a talented—but troubled—member of the roster.

The 1986–87 Mavericks team had their most successful regular season to date, going 55–27 and winning their first Midwest Division title. But despite the great expectations surrounding the team, they self-destructed in the playoffs. After hammering the Seattle SuperSonics by 22 points in Game 1, the bottom dropped out for the Mavs, as they lost Games 2 and 3 in close fashion before succumbing in Game 4 in Seattle. Following the unexpected early playoff exit, Motta, who had been with the team since its inception, shockingly resigned as head coach. John MacLeod, who had led the Phoenix Suns to nine playoff berths in 11 seasons including an NBA Finals run in 1976, was hired as his replacement.

The 1987–88 NBA season saw the Mavericks dip just a little bit in the regular season—finishing 53–29 and losing their Midwest Division title to the Denver Nuggets—but it was another successful year for the team. Mark Aguirre and James Donaldson both played in the 1988 NBA All-Star Game, the Mavericks rattled off a franchise-best 11-game winning streak, and Rolando Blackman scored his 10,000th career point. Aguirre led the team in scoring for the sixth consecutive year with 25.1 points per game, and Roy Tarpley won the NBA Sixth Man Award with averages of 13.5 points and 11.8 rebounds. The season saw the Mavs' deepest playoff run to date. They dispatched the Houston Rockets in four games and the Nuggets in six, leaving only the defending NBA Champion Lakers between them and their first-ever trip to the NBA Finals. The Mavericks gave the Lakers everything they could handle, but in the end the more experienced Lakers prevailed, defeating Dallas in seven games on the way to eventually winning their second consecutive NBA Championship.

=== 1988–1990: Injuries sting Mavs ===
Despite all the changes, the Mavs remained in contention. However, their season effectively ended when James Donaldson went down with a ruptured patella tendon on March 10, 1989, and missed the rest of the season as a result. They also traded last season's leading scorer Mark Aguirre to the Detroit Pistons for aging former top scorer Adrian Dantley mid-season. The Mavericks were left undermanned, demoralized and disheartened as they finished with a 38–44 record, losing the eighth and final playoff seed in the Western Conference via tiebreaker to the Denver Nuggets. It was their first losing season since 1982–83, which was also the last time they missed the playoffs.

The Mavericks returned to the playoffs in 1989–90 with a 47–35 record, but it was another season of off-court chaos. On November 15, only six games into the Mavs' season, Tarpley was arrested for driving while intoxicated and resisting arrest. The team started 5–6 and MacLeod was fired, replaced by assistant coach Richie Adubato. The Mavs finished the season with four straight victories to surge into the playoffs, but went down rather meekly to the Portland Trail Blazers in three games. It would be the team's last winning season and last playoff appearance until 2001.

=== 1990–1993: Free-falling ===
The team endured a number of changes in 1990, losing Sam Perkins to the Lakers via free agency and suffering injuries to practically their entire 1990–91 starting lineup. The players they managed to acquire—Rodney McCray, Fat Lever and Alex English—were all in the twilight of their careers. On March 9 it was announced that Fat Lever would have season-ending surgery on his right knee, and that very night, Tarpley suffered a knee injury of his own which ended his season. The Mavericks' season only got worse from there, and they finished with a record of 28–54, the worst in the NBA, falling behind even the second-year Minnesota Timberwolves and Orlando Magic. In March 1991, Tarpley was charged with suspicion of driving while intoxicated and was suspended again by the NBA.

It got even worse in 1991–92. Before the season even began, Tarpley violated the league's substance abuse policy for the third time and was banned from the NBA for life. The former Sixth Man Award winner's fall from grace was complete. The few talented players the Mavericks had remaining to them were lost to injury. Brad Davis' back problems forced him to retire in mid-January, and Fat Lever had knee surgery again on January 29, missing the remainder of the season—hardly worth the cost of losing two first-round draft picks. The team finished with a 22–60 record.

In 1992–93 the rebuilding began in earnest, with the Mavs trading Rolando Blackman—who by that point had surpassed Mark Aguirre as the team's all-time leading scorer—to the New York Knicks for a first-round draft pick. Blackman had made four All-Star Game appearances in his Mavericks career. Herb Williams joined the Knicks as a free agent. Fat Lever underwent more surgery and missed the entire 1992–93 season. Derek Harper was the team's sole bright spot, leading the team with 18.3 points per game.

=== 1992–1994: Flirting with futility ===
The Mavericks selected Ohio State guard Jim Jackson with the fourth overall pick of the 1992 NBA draft, but he and owner Donald Carter could not come to terms on a contract for half of his rookie season. Jackson only played 28 games in 1992–93, a year that was also ruined by trades, a coaching change and injuries. The Mavericks started 2–27 and fired Adubato on January 13, replacing him with Gar Heard. The Mavericks came dangerously close to setting the all-time worst record in NBA history (at the time, 9–73 by the 1972–73 Philadelphia 76ers). But when Jackson was signed on March 3, the Mavs managed to rally, closing the season with a 7–14 mark, including two straight wins to end the season. That year the Mavericks finished 11–71 which was the second-worst record in NBA history.

Dallas selected Kentucky forward Jamal Mashburn with the fourth overall pick of the 1993 NBA draft and hired NBC analyst and former player Quinn Buckner as coach, but the team's progress was minimal. Part of the problem was that Buckner decided from the start to be a disciplinarian on the model of his college coach, Bobby Knight, who told Buckner the only way he would be a successful NBA coach would be to run his team with an iron hand. The mostly young roster did not respond well to Buckner's stern coaching style, and started 1–23. By the end of January they were 3–40, and it was once again possible that they could tie the 1973 Sixers for the all-time worst record in the league. But 5–9 records in February and April, coupled with Buckner loosening the reins a little bit, helped the Mavs finish 13–69. It was still by far the worst record in the league, but the Mavericks again avoided setting an all-time futility record. They did, however manage to tie the NBA's single-season record for consecutive losses at 20 games (since broken).

Buckner was fired at the end of the season despite having a five-year contract. However, Carter believed that Buckner had "burned too many bridges" to bring him back for another year. In addition to his autocratic coaching style, Buckner had angered Carter and other executives by not getting their input on hiring assistants. He would garnered the worst full-season record for a rookie head coach—a record that only lasted two years, until Bill Hanzlik broke it with the Denver Nuggets. The Mavericks brought back Dick Motta, who had led the franchise to some of its most successful seasons. The Mavericks also wound up with the second pick in the 1994 NBA draft, and picked up Cal point guard Jason Kidd, giving them a solid tandem of Jackson, Mashburn and Kidd which would become known as "The Three Js".

=== 1994–1998: Three Js give Dallas hope ===
The addition of Jason Kidd infused the Mavericks with new life in 1994–95. Kidd averaged 11.7 points, 5.4 rebounds, and 7.7 assists in his rookie season, and even led the league in triple-doubles. Roy Tarpley was allowed to return to the league after three years and helped with 12.6 points and 8.2 rebounds per game. The tandem of Jim Jackson and Jamal Mashburn combined as the league's highest-scoring pair of teammates. On separate occasions, Mashburn and Jackson scored 50 points in a game that season. Mashburn contributed 24.1 points per game, fifth in the NBA; Jackson averaged 25.7 points, but suffered a severe ankle sprain in February which caused him to miss the remainder of the regular season. Second-year forward Popeye Jones had a great year as well, as he averaged 10.6 rebounds and led the NBA in offensive rebounds.

The Mavericks' improvement was dramatic. They jumped to 36–46, 10th in the Western Conference and only five games behind the Denver Nuggets for the eighth and final playoff spot. It was the biggest one-year improvement in the team's history, and the highest in the NBA that season. Some expected the Mavericks' improvement to continue with the franchise's first foray into the NBA Playoffs since 1990. But despite a 4–0 start, the 1995–96 season was a disappointment in about every conceivable way. For the second time in his career, Roy Tarpley was given a lifelong ban from the NBA for repeated violations of the anti-drug policy—he never played in the NBA again. Jamal Mashburn had season-ending surgery to repair his sore right knee only 18 games into the Mavericks' schedule.

The team's two remaining stars, Jason Kidd and Jim Jackson, bickered throughout the season, though neither of them had any trouble establishing his individual stardom. Jackson led the team in scoring with 19.6 points per game, made 121 three-pointers and was the only Mav to start in all 82 games. Kidd became the first Maverick to be elected a starter in the NBA All-Star Game, and finished second in the league in assists and fourth in steals while averaging 16.6 points per game. George McCloud, who averaged 9.6 points per game in his previous year, blew away his career-high scoring average as the Mavs resorted to the outside shot time and again due to their lack of an inside scoring threat. McCloud averaged 18.9 points per game and made 257 three-pointers, equaling the second-highest individual season total in league history.

Overall, the Mavericks connected on 735 of their 2,039 three-point attempts, both new league records. But that particular statistic is more indicative of the Mavs' desperation to get points from somewhere than of how well they did as a team. The Mavs finished 26–56, fifth in the Midwest Division and 33 games out of first place. At season's end, Motta was relieved of his head coaching responsibilities and replaced by former Bulls assistant coach Jim Cleamons. And Don Carter, the only owner the Mavericks had ever had, sold the team to a group of investors led by H. Ross Perot, Jr.

The 1996–97 season was a year of transition for the Mavericks, as they basically redesigned their entire team; 27 different players saw action for this Dallas team, setting an all-time NBA record. By the time the season was over, only rookie forward Samaki Walker remained from the opening-day roster. The first big move came in December, as Jason Kidd, Loren Meyer and Tony Dumas were traded to the Phoenix Suns for guards Michael Finley and Sam Cassell and forward A.C. Green. By far the most important of these acquisitions was Finley who, after his first half-season in Dallas, would go on to average over or near 20 points per game for at least the next seven years of his Mavericks career. He made two visits to the NBA All-Star Game, and even played in each of the Mavs' games until the 2004–05 season.

Don Nelson was hired as Dallas' general manager on February 7, and it did not take him long to leave his own mark on the team. Within a week of his hiring, the Mavs had released Fred Roberts and Oliver Miller and traded Jamal Mashburn to the Miami Heat for forwards Kurt Thomas and Martin Müürsepp and guard Sasha Danilović. This particular trade did not really pan out for the Mavs. Thomas did not play in 1996–97, and only ended up playing in five games as a Maverick before signing as a free agent with the New York Knicks. Danilović played in 13 games for the Mavs before opting out of his contract and signing with Bucker Bologna of the Italian League, and Müürsepp played in 73 games for the Mavericks over the next two years before leaving the NBA.

Chris Gatling was the Mavericks' sole representative in the NBA All-Star Game, but he did not last much longer in Dallas. In one of the largest two-team trades in NBA history, the Mavericks traded Chris Gatling, Jim Jackson, Sam Cassell, George McCloud and Eric Montross to the New Jersey Nets for center Shawn Bradley, forward Ed O'Bannon and guards Khalid Reeves and Robert Pack. Nelson claimed the trades were necessary because the situation in the locker room was unacceptable. However, whereas Cassell went on to become a consistent floor leader and Jackson, Gatling and McCloud all continued to be solid contributors to their teams for several more years, only Bradley lasted any sort of time in Dallas and would spend part of the next eight years putting up modest contributions for the Mavs and giving them solid numbers in terms of blocked shots.

Undrafted rookie guard Erick Strickland was a pleasant surprise for the Mavs as he averaged 10.6 points per game. He, along with Finley and Bradley, were expected to be the core of this new Mavericks team. The constant changes made it impossible to establish any sort of team chemistry in 1996–97, and the Mavericks finished 24–58. But they had acquired some of the pieces that would help them start to turn things around in years to come. In 1997–98, despite a poor record of 20–62, Dallas had a knack for giving some of the NBA's elite teams a hard time, as they beat the Seattle SuperSonics, New York Knicks, Indiana Pacers and Chicago Bulls. Against the Bulls, Dallas went on a 17–2 run to force overtime, where they won 104–97. Midway through that season, Nelson fired Cleamons and named himself head coach.

=== 1998–2001: Dirk Nowitzki/Mark Cuban comes to town ===
In the lockout-shortened 1998–99 season, the Mavericks finished with a 19–31 record, but Michael Finley and Gary Trent put up solid numbers and led their team to their first winning home record (15–10) since 1989–90. Notable were the acquisitions of power forward Dirk Nowitzki and point guard Steve Nash, two seemingly unspectacular moves which would make a great impact in the future. In the following season started to win on a consistent basis. Led by Finley, the Mavericks earned their first 40-win season since 1989–90. He was helped by Nowitzki, who finally "arrived" in the NBA and established himself as a potent offensive threat.

On January 14, 2000, Ross Perot's group sold the Dallas Mavericks to internet entrepreneur and season ticket-holder Mark Cuban for $285 million. Cuban immediately set out to revitalize the Mavericks and increase the team's popularity in Dallas and nationwide. His controversial moves (he allowed Dennis Rodman to live in his house for a week before temporarily signing him) and outspoken personality quickly made him a fan favorite in Dallas and garnered the team much press in the national media. He has also been fined millions of dollars for violating NBA rules.

In 2000–01, the Mavericks improved further and finished with an impressive 53–29 record, fueled by an impressive offensive triangle of Nowitzki, Finley and Nash. The Mavs made a blockbuster trade minutes before the trade deadline that sent Hubert Davis, Christian Laettner, Courtney Alexander, Loy Vaught, and Etan Thomas to the Washington Wizards for Juwan Howard, Calvin Booth and Obinna Ekezie. This move brought in fresh blood that secured the club's first playoff visit in 11 years. Also, Wang Zhizhi became the first Chinese player to play in the NBA, signing with the Mavs in January, along with the Eduardo Nájera, bringing Dallas a decent international cast that included Canada's Nash and Germany's Nowitzki. In the playoffs, the Mavericks won the first round against the Utah Jazz, advancing to the second round for the first time since 1988. Even though they would be eliminated by the San Antonio Spurs in five games, it marked a sense of optimism for Dallas in seriously contending for an NBA title. This was also the last season in the old Reunion Arena before making the move to the modern American Airlines Center.

=== 2001–2004: "Big Three" of Nash, Nowitzki, and Finley ===
These years also saw Nowitzki win the first two of his five consecutive Euroscar Awards as the top player in Europe, in 2002 and 2003. (Note that this award is presented at the end of a calendar year, as opposed to the end of the season as in the NBA awards.)

==== 2001–02 ====
The 2001–02 season was a great season for the Mavericks, with a 57–25 record and multiple sellout crowds in the American Airlines Center. This season also saw a change in logo and colors, changing from the cowboy hat logo and green to a new horse logo. In addition, the team gained sleeker uniforms. Another blockbuster trade sent Juwan Howard, Tim Hardaway and Donnell Harvey to the Denver Nuggets in exchange for Raef LaFrentz, Nick Van Exel, Tariq Abdul-Wahad and Avery Johnson, the Mavericks also made several attempts to sign the Utah Jazz's star Karl Malone. The Mavericks swept the Kevin Garnett-led Minnesota Timberwolves in the playoffs but lost again in the second round, this time to the Chris Webber-led Sacramento Kings.

==== 2002–03 ====
But it was only in the next season when the Mavericks finally broke through. They started the 2002–03 season with a 14–0 record which was 1 shy of tying the NBA record set by the 1993–94 Houston Rockets (15–0). The Mavericks finished with a 60–22 record in the regular season, astonishing fans and critics with their sparkling offense. The "Big Three" Nowitzki, Finley, and Nash were a 100-point-game waiting to happen and led the Mavericks into the Conference Finals against the Tim Duncan-led San Antonio Spurs. However, with the series tied 1–1 Dirk Nowitzki, the team's leading scorer, suffered a knee injury in game three that kept him out of the rest of the series. This worsened the Mavs depth problem in the front court (both of their backup centers were injured for the entire series) and the Spurs took the series in 6 games.

==== 2003–04 ====
In 2003–04, two blockbuster trades were announced. The Mavericks acquired Antawn Jamison, Danny Fortson, Jiří Welsch and Chris Mills from Golden State in exchange for Nick Van Exel, Evan Eschmeyer, Popeye Jones, Avery Johnson and Antoine Rigaudeau. Another high-profile trade sent Raef LaFrentz, Chris Mills and Jiří Welsch to Boston for Antoine Walker and Tony Delk. Although the team struggled with chemistry, the Mavericks easily qualified for the playoffs. With the trio Nowitzki-Finley-Nash and NBA Sixth Man of the Year Jamison, the Mavericks continued their reputation as the best offensive team in the NBA. Notable were two rookies, Josh Howard and Marquis Daniels, who made an immediate impact. However, the Mavericks were eliminated quickly in the playoffs, losing in the first round to the Chris Webber-led Sacramento Kings, a team which clearly played better defense. The Mavericks management had to re-evaluate their strategy.

=== 2004–2006: Roster changes ===
==== 2004–05 ====
The 2004–05 season brought in blockbuster trades which (among others) brought in burly center Erick Dampier, combo guard Jason Terry, speedy rookie point guard Devin Harris, scoring machine Jerry Stackhouse, and defensive stalwart Alan Henderson. Although the loss of All-Star Steve Nash via free agency visibly hurt the Mavericks' offense, the new acquisitions strengthened the team defense. The run-and-gun style of former times changed into a more balanced style of play. At the All-Star break, the Mavericks acquired Keith Van Horn for Calvin Booth and Henderson, the latter resigning only days later. Nowitzki added his third consecutive Euroscar during this season as well. On March 19, longtime coach Don Nelson resigned and his assistant Avery Johnson succeeded him. Under Johnson's tutelage, the defense of the Mavericks became stronger and they easily qualified for the playoffs with an impressive 58–24 record. The Mavericks defeated the Houston Rockets in Round 1 of the playoffs in seven games but then lost to the Phoenix Suns 4–2, led by former Maverick star Steve Nash.

==== 2005–06: First finals appearance ====
Prior to the 2005 NBA draft, the Mavericks had traded all their picks away and were left empty-handed. On August 15, 2005, veteran guard Michael Finley was waived under the new "Allan Houston Rule". Under this rule, the Orlando Magic waived Doug Christie, who then signed with the Mavericks. On August 19, the Mavericks held a press conference announcing they had re-signed Darrell Armstrong, and introduced Christie, DeSagana Diop, Rawle Marshall, and Josh Powell as new Mavericks. Christie's playing time was limited amidst a surgically repaired ankle still hampering his play. He was waived on November 25, 2005. At the end of calendar 2005, Nowitzki achieved a rare double by winning both the Euroscar and Mr. Europa, a second prestigious award for the top European player. He additionally was named the inaugural FIBA Europe Player of the Year.

Up until the very end of the season, the Mavericks would be toe-to-toe with the San Antonio Spurs for the crown of the Southwest Division as well as the first spot in the Western Conference. However, they fell short of the title and had to settle for a fourth seed. Nonetheless, they once again achieved a 60–22 record, with Avery Johnson winning NBA Coach of the Year honors. In the playoffs, they swept the Memphis Grizzlies, leading to a titanic series against their state rivals and the reigning NBA champions the San Antonio Spurs. Five out of the seven games were decided in the last minute, including a Game 7 that had to go into overtime, with the Mavs prevailing under the guidance of Dirk Nowitzki and an incredibly deep bench. The Mavericks were able to advance to the Conference Finals against former teammate Steve Nash and the Phoenix Suns. The Mavs' defense and depth enabled them to take the series, as they defeated the Phoenix Suns in game 6 of the Western Conference Finals on June 3, 2006, in the US Airways Center in Phoenix, and the Mavs advanced to their first NBA Finals in franchise history.

In the NBA Finals, the Mavericks faced the Miami Heat, held home-court advantage and scored two convincing wins. After game 2, Dallas city officials had already planned the victory parade. However, in Game 3, the Mavs blew a late double-digit lead, courtesy of Heat guard Dwyane Wade. He carried the Heat to the win, with Nowitzki missing a potentially game-tying free throw in the last seconds. After getting blown out in Game 4, the Mavericks suffered another loss in Game 5 when Wade scored the game-tying basket in the last possession of regular time, putting the Heat ahead with last-second free throws in overtime. The tragic figure was Josh Howard, who missed a pair of clutch free throws in overtime and mistakenly called an early timeout, so the Mavs had to bring in the ball at backcourt rather than halfcourt for the last possession. In Game 6, the Mavericks took an early double digit lead, but again, Wade poured in 36 points, helped by Alonzo Mourning's five blocked shots, and the Mavericks lost their fourth game and the title after a string of botched three-pointers. Some Mavericks fans were stunned by the defeat. Mavericks owner Mark Cuban was fined a total of $250,000 for "several acts of misconduct" during the series, and Nowitzki was fined $5,000 for kicking a ball into the stands after Game 5. Nowitzki was also caught by TV cameras attacking a stationary bicycle in the hallway outside of the Mavericks locker room. Jerry Stackhouse was suspended for Game 5 after fouling Shaquille O'Neal on a breakaway dunk attempt. The latter marked the third time a Mavericks player was suspended in the 2006 playoffs.

The Mavericks became only the third team in NBA history (the first since 1977) to lose in the Finals after taking a 2–0 lead. In Game 3, the Mavs held a 13-point lead with under seven minutes remaining but were outscored 22–7 in the momentum-changing 98–96 defeat. The Heat's performance in the last seven minutes represented the team's greatest postseason comeback in team history.

=== 2006–2010: First round exits ===
After a disappointing end to their magnificent playoff run in 2006, the Mavericks sought retribution in the new season. After a rocky 0–4 start, the Mavericks then went on a historic run and posted a 52–5 record over their next 57 games. They finished out the regular season with a record of 67–15, good enough to be tied for sixth place all-time, first in the league and the first seed in the Western Conference playoffs. Dirk Nowitzki had a dominant season, further cementing his place as one of the game's elite players; he won his fifth consecutive Euroscar during the season, and was named the NBA MVP at its end. Josh Howard was named to the all-star team.

However, the first place Mavericks were defeated in 6 games by the eighth-seeded Golden State Warriors, which is regarded by some as one of the biggest upsets in NBA history, while others do not consider it an upset at all. The Mavs were exposed defensively, and the Warriors systematically dismantled the Mavericks by exploiting matchups and preying on Dirk Nowitzki's weaknesses. Former NBA champion and All-Star legend Bill Russell stated in his NBA.com blog that he did not consider it to be an upset, since Golden State was 3–0 versus the Mavericks in the regular season. On the year, the Mavericks went 67–12 against the rest of the league and 0–3 against Golden State, giving credibility to Russell's belief that the Warriors' win should not have surprised NBA fans. Ironically, the Warriors were coached by Don Nelson, the immediate past manager/coach of the Mavericks until he stepped down at the end of 2005–06, and he had been appointed head coach of the Warriors in the 2006–07 midseason

Nowitzki's winning of regular season MVP honors and his team's stunning first-round exit created an awkward dilemma regarding the MVP trophy ceremony. Traditionally, the MVP award is given to the winner in a ceremony between the first and second round of the playoffs. But it has been believed that the league opted to put some distance between the MVP presentation and the Mavericks' elimination against the Warriors. By the time Nowitzki collected his MVP award, nearly two weeks had elapsed since the Mavs were ousted in the playoffs.

==== 2007–08 ====
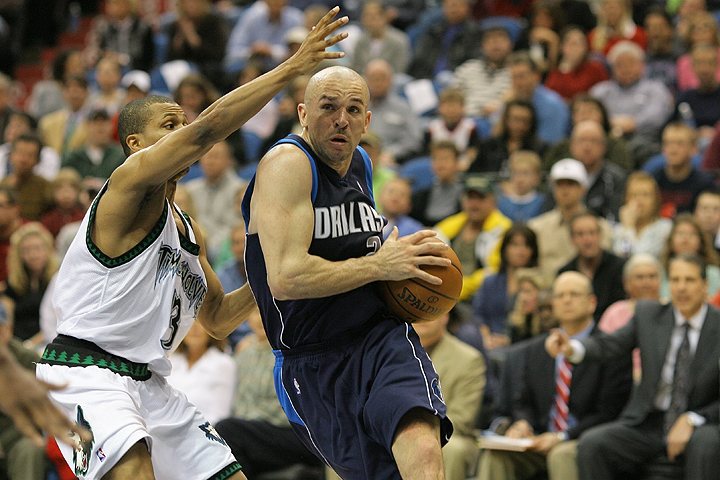
Kidd drives to the basket during a game against the Minnesota Timberwolves.

The Mavericks dealt Devin Harris, two first-round picks and others in a blockbuster trade to the New Jersey Nets for veteran all-star Jason Kidd and other role players, Cuban also tried to sign the free agent Kevin Garnett unsuccessfully. The Mavericks were 3–11 against winning teams since the trade and lost Nowitzki for a little over a week due to a high ankle sprain injury. He returned April 2 in a crucial game against the Golden State Warriors in a 111–86 Mavericks victory and helped defeat the Phoenix Suns in a 105–98 win on April 6. This win in Phoenix was especially significant because the Mavs had been nearly unable to defeat a contending team on the road the entire season. Continuing their playoff push, Dirk hit a crucial three-pointer with 0.9 seconds left, defeating the Utah Jazz 97–94 on April 10. This victory guaranteed them a playoff spot and their eighth consecutive 50-win season. The Mavericks ended the season with a record of 51–31. In the first round of the playoffs, the Mavericks were eliminated once again, by the New Orleans Hornets 4–1 on the road, 99–94.

Just one day after a disappointing season ended, Avery Johnson was dismissed as Head Coach of the Dallas Mavericks. On May 9, 2008, Rick Carlisle was hired as the head coach.

==== 2008–09 ====
After getting off to a rocky start at 2–7, the Mavericks eventually found themselves with the sixth spot in the Western Conference playoff bracket for 2009. This was after going 50–32 (ninth consecutive 50+-win season) and about three to four weeks earlier, were not even sure if they were going to make the eighth and final spot. A run of 5–1 in their last six regular season games got them to a game over the Hornets for sixth place. Dirk Nowitzki also entered the postseason with a streak of 25 consecutive games of scoring 20 or more points, which was ended in the first game of the quarterfinals series versus the arch-rival, San Antonio Spurs.

The Mavericks surprised a number of people by winning Game 1, 105–97 in San Antonio. The Spurs quickly won game two in a rout. As the series shifted to Dallas, who had only lost one game there after the All-Star Break, won both Games 3 and 4. San Antonio was just trying to win Game 5 to extend the series, but they could not do it as the Mavericks closed out the series with a 13-point-victory, 106–93. With the Victory, the Mavericks advanced to the Conference Semi-finals for the first time since 2006.

In the semifinals, they would face the second-seeded Denver Nuggets, who were fresh off an easy 4–1 series win against the New Orleans Hornets, including a 58-point win in New Orleans. The Mavericks would stay close with the Nuggets in the first three quarters of Games 1 and 2, but it was the fourth quarter where Carmelo Anthony and the Nuggets would finally wake up, as they took the first two games by double-digit figures. Game 3 in Dallas was close the whole way, and Dallas seemed to be going on to win, leading by five points with less than a minute to go. But Carmelo Anthony hit a cold-blooded three-pointer to give the Nuggets a 106–105 victory. The play generated quite a bit of controversy, because Maverick guard Antoine Wright clearly fouled Anthony, but since there is no replay used in the NBA, the Mavericks suffered a heart breaking game 3 loss. It was later announced by the league that the referees made the wrong call, but despite this the Mavericks still faced a 3–0 deficit in the series.

44 points in Game 4 from Dirk Nowitzki would save the Mavericks season, sending the series back to Denver for a Game 5, the series in Denver's favor, 3–1. Game 5 would prove to be the final game for the Mavericks of the 2009 season, as they would be ousted by a score of 124–110. The elimination led to an off-season facing a number of questions about the future construction of the team.

==== 2009–10: Return to the elites ====
After a disappointing loss to the Nuggets in the playoffs, the Mavericks entered the off-season with multiple questions about the future construction of the team. They began by re-signing Jason Kidd to a three-year contract extension, which took care of their pending point guard issue. The Mavericks also made a move to compound their age problem, by trading for former all-star small forward Shawn Marion. In a three-team deal with the Grizzlies and Raptors, the Mavericks sent swing-man Antoine Wright along with defensive stalwart Devean George to Toronto, while aging guard Jerry Stackhouse landed in Memphis. Dallas also acquired burly center Nathan Jawai, and Kris Humphries. Multiple analysts viewed this as a beneficial trade for the Mavericks, being that it countered their age issues, while simultaneously providing them with more depth on the bench. The Mavericks also added veteran forwards Tim Thomas, Drew Gooden, and Quinton Ross.

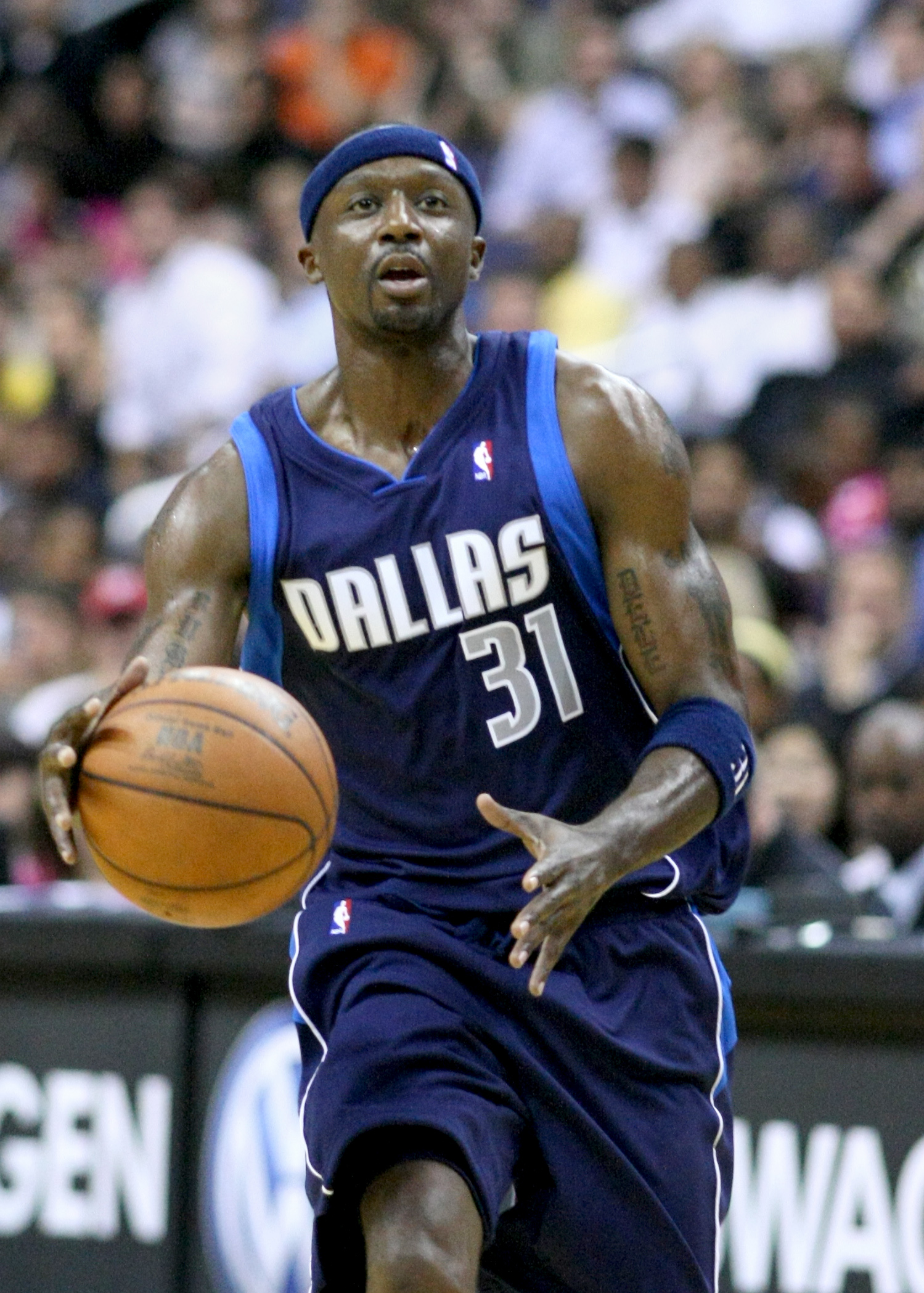
Jason Terry.

These moves proved successful, because after dropping the season opener to the Wizards, the Mavericks went on to beat multiple contenders such as the Los Angeles Lakers, San Antonio Spurs, Houston Rockets, and the Phoenix Suns which was something that the Mavericks had been unable to do the last two seasons.

A day before the trade deadline, the Mavericks instigated a block-buster deal. The trade sent Josh Howard, James Singleton, and Drew Gooden to the Washington Wizards in exchange for Caron Butler, Brendan Haywood, and Deshawn Stevenson. The Mavericks felt that this trade was necessary due to Howard's declining performance and apparent unhappiness with the Mavericks organization. Some NBA analysts felt that this was a good move, because not only did it remove a disgruntled Howard from the line-up, it simultaneously brought Dirk Nowitzki a quality supporting cast, with some believing that the Mavs could contend for a title after the trade went through. The trade clearly worked, because the new-look Mavericks came out of the all-star break with a vengeance. On January 24, 2010, the Dallas Mavericks routed The New York Knicks 128–78. This was the third largest margin of victory in NBA history. The previous largest margin of victory for the Mavericks was 45 points. After dropping the second-half opener to the Oklahoma City Thunder, the Mavericks went on to win 13-straight games before losing to the New York Knicks. On April 10, the Mavericks clinched the Southwest division after defeating the Portland Trail Blazers 83–77. The Mavericks finished the season with an impressive 55–27 record, good enough for the second seed in the Western Conference. The Mavericks then entered the postseason with quite a bit of optimism and an assurance that they could seriously contend for a title.

During the playoffs though, this optimism proved to be short lived, because after winning game one 100–94, behind Nowitzki's 36-point performance, the Mavericks dropped the next three games to their in-state rivals, the San Antonio Spurs, before winning game five. Dallas would eventually lose against San Antonio in six games 97–87, leading to yet another off-season full of speculation, mostly centering on franchise player Dirk Nowitzki's pending free agent status.

==== 2010 off-season ====
After yet another first round melt-down, the Mavericks began an unexpectedly early off-season. The first order of business for Mark Cuban and the Mavericks was to re-sign Dirk Nowitzki, and did so on July 4, 2010, when the Mavericks and Dirk agreed to a 4-year deal worth $80M. On July 13, the Dallas Mavericks after losing the opportunity to sign LeBron James, Dwyane Wade, and Amar'e Stoudemire acquired centers Tyson Chandler and Alexis Ajinça from the Charlotte Bobcats for center Erick Dampier, forward Eduardo Nájera and guard Matt Carroll.

=== 2010–2011 season: Championship season ===
The 2010–11 campaign saw the Mavericks fly out of the gate, winning 24 out of their first 29 games. However, on December 27, Dirk Nowitzki sustained a knee injury that derailed the Mavericks momentum, combined with the team's second-leading scorer Caron Butler suffering a season-ending knee injury himself only four nights later, raising questions of if the Mavericks could make it 11 straight 50-win seasons. The Mavericks then went on to drop their next seven games, causing serious concern as to who would lead the offense in Nowitzki's absence. This however would prove to only be a temporary setback because Nowitzki only missed nine games, and admittedly rushed back to assist the Mavericks' reeling offense, and consequently they quickly returned to their winning ways. The Mavericks re-invented their defensive reputation around the league during the 2010–11 campaign, mostly in part to off-season acquisition Tyson Chandler (who was later named to the All-Defensive Second Team). The Mavericks battled the San Antonio Spurs all season long for the division title, but instead settled for the third seed, with a 57–25 record. However, due to the Mavericks reputation as playoff chokers, some predicted them to be ousted in the first round against the sixth-seeded Portland Trail Blazers. Yahoo! Sports analyst Adrian Wojnarowski even went so far as to predict a sweep for the Trail Blazers.

The Mavs entered the postseason as the third seed and despite toting a 57–25 record, were predicted by the media to be ousted by the injury-riddled Trail Blazers. The Mavericks won games 1 and 2 on their home floor in convincing fashion, however upon their arrival to the Rose Garden in Portland, problems began to arise. After dropping game three to Portland, the Mavericks blew a 23-point fourth-quarter lead in game four to allow Portland to tie the series at two games apiece. The whispers then began to re-surface that the Mavericks were going to allow another impressive regular season to go down the drain. The Mavericks then responded, posting back-to-back wins to oust the Blazers in six games. They then met the two-time defending champion Los Angeles Lakers in the Western Conference Semifinals. This series was the first time that Kobe Bryant had met Dirk Nowitzki in a playoff series and was expected to be extremely competitive; that however did not prove to be the case. The Mavericks shocked the NBA world by winning the first two games in Los Angeles, and took a 2–0 lead heading back to Dallas. They then won a thrilling game three in Dallas, courtesy of 32 points from Nowitzki in a 98–92 victory. The Mavericks then provided the perfect exclamation mark, crushing the Lakers in game 4 by a score of 122–86. In that game, Jason Terry set an NBA playoff record with nine three-pointers with just one miss, ousting the Lakers in a four-game sweep. The Mavericks then met the upstart Oklahoma City Thunder in the Western Conference Finals. Dirk Nowitzki set the tone in the series in game one with a 48-point performance, with the Mavericks taking game 1 by a score of 121–112. The Thunder then responded with 106–100 victory in game 2. The Mavericks then won the next three games, including a 15-point comeback in game 4, to take the series in five games. The Mavericks claimed their second Western Conference Championship in franchise history, and met the team that defeated them in the 2006 NBA Finals, the Miami Heat.

The Mavs entered the 2011 NBA Finals as underdogs, due to Miami's "Big Three" coming together during the course of the 2010–11 NBA Playoffs. After dropping game one in Miami by a score of 92–84, the Mavs needed more than just Nowitzki to score, with Nowitzki even calling out teammate Jason Terry earlier in the playoffs. In the fourth quarter of game 2 with the Mavericks trailing 88–73, Dallas was desperate to avoid a 0–2 heading back home. Dallas then staged a comeback, going on a 22–5 run to end the game, and stun the Heat with a game two victory, evening up the series at a game a piece. After the series shifted back to Dallas, the Mavericks lost in game 3, with Nowitzki narrowly missing the potential game-tying shot, by a score of 88–86. Dallas yet again showed their resiliency, winning a pivotal game 4 with Dirk hitting multiple big shots down the stretch to tie the series at two. Game 5 was a bit of an offensive showcase, with both teams breaking 100 points for the first time in the series. Jason Kidd and Jason Terry both hit huge shots down the stretch and the Mavericks defeated the Heat with a 112–103 victory, putting them one game from their first ever NBA title. Three nights later, the Mavericks captured their first ever NBA title with a 105–95 victory, completely reversing what had happened in the 2006 NBA Finals. Nowitzki scored 21, including 18 in the second half, and Terry provided 27 points off the Dallas bench. Nowitzki was so emotional after the game that he headed to the locker room before the game had concluded, and had to be coaxed back onto the floor for the NBA Championship trophy presentation. Nowitzki took home the NBA Finals MVP honors, after averaging 26 points a game during the series, shedding the Mavericks label as "soft", and putting an end to the Mavericks postseason futility.

=== 2011–2018: Post-championship decline ===
The following season was cut to 66 games due to a lockout, which meant the Mavericks had to wait until Christmas Day to raise their first championship banner. During the brief off-season owner Mark Cuban decided to maintain financial flexibility by letting key contributors Tyson Chandler, DeShawn Stevenson, J.J. Barea and Caron Butler go. Chandler signed with the New York Knicks, Stevenson joined the New Jersey Nets, Barea went to the Minnesota Timberwolves, and Butler joined the Los Angeles Clippers. Meanwhile, they acquired incumbent NBA Sixth Man of the Year Lamar Odom via a trade with the Lakers, while signing veterans Vince Carter and Delonte West.

The Mavericks raised their championship banner prior to their Finals rematch with the Heat on Christmas Day, but in what would soon become a mirror image of the 2006–07 Heat's eventual failed title defense, Miami blew them out in a 105–94 loss, marking Dallas's first regular season loss to Miami in eight seasons. Things did not get better for Dallas after starting the season 0–3, losing to the Thunder in a playoff rematch on December 29. As the calendar turned to 2012, the Mavericks started off on a high note, winning 13 of 18 games in January, but they limped to a 22–22 record the rest of the way, eventually finishing seventh with a 36–30 record, their lowest finish since the 2007–08 season. Nowitzki normed just 21.6 points, 6 rebounds and 45.7% shooting, his lowest numbers since the 2000–01 season. Meanwhile, Odom proved to be a bad fit for the Mavericks, and they decided to sit him out for the final two months of the season.

In a rematch from last year, the Mavericks faced the Oklahoma City Thunder in the first round of the 2012 NBA playoffs. Games 1 and 2 went down to the wire, but the Mavericks' fell short on both occasions as Kevin Durant bailed the Thunder out with a game-winning jumper in Game 1, and late-game free throws in Game 2. Back in Dallas for Game 3, the Mavericks fell flat throughout the game and suffered a humiliating 95–79 defeat to fall behind 0–3. With their backs behind the wall in Game 4, the Mavericks led for much of the second half, but James Harden's 15-point fourth quarter rallied the Thunder to a 103–97 win and eliminated the Mavericks from contention. It marked the first time Dallas was swept in a seven-game series, and became the third defending champion to be swept in the first round after the aforementioned 2006–07 Heat and the 1956–57 Philadelphia Warriors.

=== 2018–2025: The Luka Dončić era ===
==== 2018–19 season: Arrival of Luka Dončić ====
The Mavericks finished the 2017–18 season with a 24–58 record, their worst in 20 years. In the 2018 NBA draft, the Mavericks were awarded the fifth pick. With their eyes on Slovenian guard Luka Dončić, a projected top-three pick, the Mavericks worked out a deal with the Atlanta Hawks, who owned the third pick. The Hawks agreed to draft Dončić for Dallas, while the Mavericks drafted point guard Trae Young for Atlanta. The two teams traded the draft rights to their selections, with the Mavericks packaging in a top five protected 2019 first-round pick.

==== Dirk Nowitzki's retirement ====
On April 9, 2019, Dirk Nowitzki announced his retirement from the NBA. He spent a record-breaking 21 seasons with a single team, surpassing only Kobe Bryant, and the fifth player to spend 21 seasons in the NBA.

==== 2019–20 season: Returning to the playoffs ====
The Mavericks finished with the 43–32 record, qualifying again for the playoffs in the seventh seed. On August 23, 2020, Dončić scored a historic and series-tying buzzer beater against the Los Angeles Clippers in Game 4 in overtime 135–133. Dončić had 43 points, 17 rebounds, 13 assists, and a game-winning buzzer beater. This buzzer beater broke a number of records. He became the youngest player to hit a game-winning buzzer beater in the playoffs, and the third to make 40+ points, 15+ rebounds, and 10+ assists in a playoff game whilst hitting a buzzer beater, and the fifth (after Michael Jordan, Kawhi Leonard, LeBron James, and Damian Lillard) to score at least 40 points and a buzzer beater in a playoff game. He is also the youngest person to hit a game-winning buzzer beater in a playoff game. However, the Mavericks lost to Leonard and the Clippers in 6 games.

==== 2020–21 season: Postseason rematch with the Clippers ====
For the second consecutive year, the now 5-seed Dallas Mavericks faced the now 4-seed Clippers. However, they lost the Western Conference first round series in seven games after winning the first two games and three games in Los Angeles.

==== 2021-22 season: Back to the Western Conference Finals ====
Under new head coach Jason Kidd, the Mavericks finished with a record of 52-30 good for the number 4 seed in the West. They defeated the Utah Jazz in six games to open the playoffs, giving the Mavs their first playoff win since their championship season in 2011. Their next opponent was the league-best 64-win Phoenix Suns. Dallas shocked the Suns, defeating them in seven games to advance to the Western Conference Finals but unfortunately the Mavericks season ended in a five-game defeat to the eventual champion Golden State Warriors.

==== 2022-23 season: Missed playoffs and restructuring ====
After losing rising star guard, Jalen Brunson, to the New York Knicks, the Mavericks struggled to find the same synergy they had the prior year, going 10-10 through the first two months of the season. In February 2023, the Mavericks made their first blockbuster trade under Nico Harrison, sending Spencer Dinwiddie, Dorian Finney-Smith, an unprotected first-round pick, and two second-round picks to the Brooklyn Nets for Kyrie Irving. Questions grew around whether the Dončić/Irving pairing could be successful as the team struggled after the All-Star break and missed the playoffs for the first time since Dončić's rookie year.

==== 2023-24 season: Return to the NBA Finals ====
The Mavericks finished the 2023–2024 regular season as Southwest Division champions and as the 5th seed in the West with a 50–32 record. The Mavericks would face the Los Angeles Clippers in the first round of the 2024 NBA playoffs for the third time in five seasons, however this time the Mavs would avenge previous playoff defeats to the Clippers in 2020 and 2021 by winning the series 4–2. They proceeded to then eliminate the one-seeded Oklahoma City Thunder in six games, winning the series-clinching Game 6 at home, 117–116. The win allowed the Mavericks to advance to the Western Conference Finals for the second time in three years. In the Western Conference Finals, the Mavericks defeated the Minnesota Timberwolves in five games to win their third Western Conference title in franchise history. The Mavericks would go on to face the Boston Celtics in the 2024 NBA Finals, their first NBA Finals appearance since their 2011 victory. In those, the Mavericks lost in five games. Their one win came from a 122–84 blowout, the third-largest blowout in NBA Finals history.

==== 2024–2025: Last year of Luka ====
On July 6, 2024, Klay Thompson was traded to Mavericks in exchange for a 2025 second-round pick via a sign-and-trade. The Mavericks also traded Hardaway Jr. to the Detroit Pistons for Quentin Grimes, while also acquiring Naji Marshall, Melvin Ajinça, and Spencer Dinwiddie.

On February 1, 2025, the Mavericks sent Luka Dončić, Markieff Morris, and Maxi Kleber to the Los Angeles Lakers in a blockbuster trade for Anthony Davis, Max Christie, and a 2029 first-round draft pick. The Utah Jazz received Jalen Hood-Schifino and two second-round picks to facilitate the trade. The trade was regarded as one of the most significant and unexpected in NBA history, marking the first time two reigning All-NBA players were traded for each other midseason. The Mavericks, who initiated the deal, drew heavy criticism for trading their franchise player, while Mavericks general manager Nico Harrison defended the trade, stating, "I believe that defense wins championships." Dončić on the other hand was blindsided by the trade; he was not told of it until the deal was done and according to Harrison, Dončić has severed the relationship between himself and the organization.

=== Arrival of Cooper Flagg (2025–present) ===
The Mavericks ended their 2024–25 season in the play in against the Memphis Grizzlies. On May 12, 2025, the Mavericks won the first overall pick in the 2025 NBA draft with a less than a 2% chance of getting the pick, selecting Cooper Flagg.
