= Dompierre =

Dompierre may refer to:

== France ==
- Dompierre, Oise
- Dompierre, Orne
- Dompierre, Vosges
- Dompierre-aux-Bois, in the Meuse département
- Dompierre-Becquincourt, in the Somme département
- Dompierre-du-Chemin, in the Ille-et-Vilaine département
- Dompierre-en-Morvan, in the Côte-d'Or département
- Dompierre-les-Églises, in the Haute-Vienne département
- Dompierre-les-Ormes, in the Saône-et-Loire département
- Dompierre-les-Tilleuls, in the Doubs département
- Dompierre-sous-Sanvignes, in the Saône-et-Loire département
- Dompierre-sur-Authie, in the Somme département
- Dompierre-sur-Besbre, in the Allier département
- Dompierre-sur-Chalaronne, in the Ain département
- Dompierre-sur-Charente, in the Charente-Maritime département
- Dompierre-sur-Helpe, in the Nord département
- Dompierre-sur-Héry, in the Nièvre département
- Dompierre-sur-Mer, in the Charente-Maritime département
- Dompierre-sur-Mont, in the Jura département
- Dompierre-sur-Nièvre, in the Nièvre département
- Dompierre-sur-Veyle, in the Ain département
- Dompierre-sur-Yon, in the Vendée département

== Switzerland ==
- Dompierre, Fribourg
- Dompierre, Vaud

== See also ==
- Dampierre (disambiguation)
- Joseph Théodore Dompierre
