= Dampier (surname) =

Dampier is an English toponymic surname, from one of several places named Dampierre in France. People with the surname include:

- Alex Dampier (born 1951), Canadian-British athlete and coach in ice hockey
- Alfred Dampier (1843–1908), English-born actor and playwright, active in Australia
- Claude Dampier (1879–1955), English actor
- Devon Dampier (born 2004), American football player
- Erick Dampier (born 1975), American basketball player
- Jeffrey Dampier (1966–2005), American lottery winner and murder victim
- John Dampier (1750–1826), English athlete in cricket
- Lily Dampier (1867/1968 – 1915), Australian actress
- Louie Dampier (born 1944), American basketball player
- Robert Dampier (1799–1874), English artist
- Thomas Dampier (1748–1812), English cleric
- Thomas Dampier (priest) (ca. 1700–1777), English cleric and educator
- William Dampier (1651–1715), English explorer, the first person to circumnavigate the Earth three times
- William Cecil Dampier (1867–1952), British scientist, agriculturist and science historian

== See also ==
- Dampier (disambiguation)
