= Hirsch Metropolitan High School =

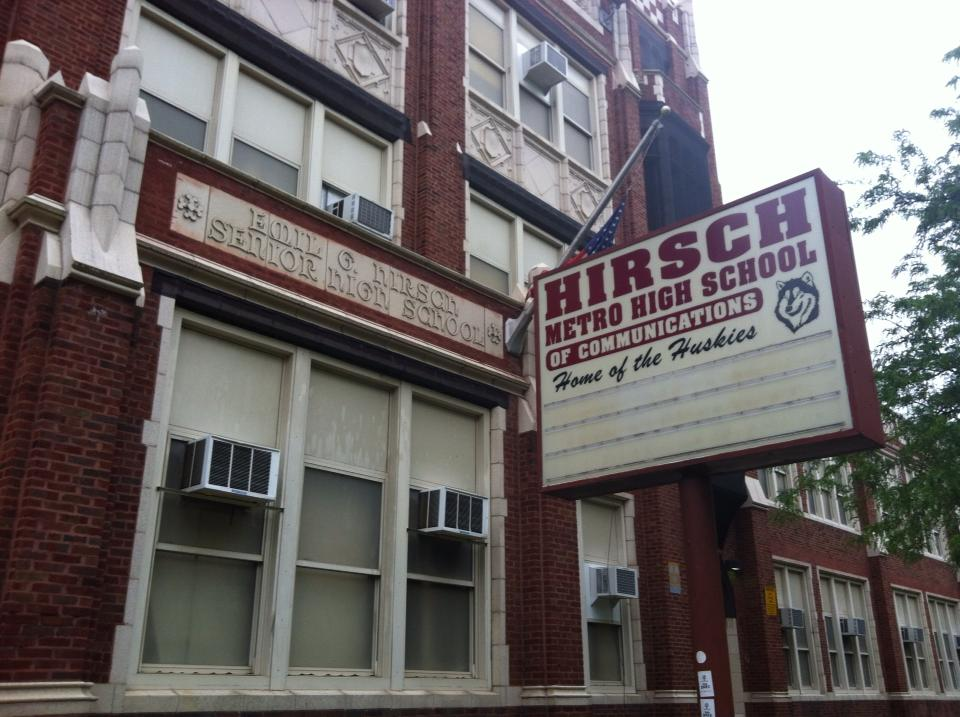

Location
- 7740 S. Ingleside Avenue; Chicago, Illinois 60619; United States; 41.7539°N 87.6019°W

Information
- School type: Public; Secondary
- Opened: 1926
- School district: Chicago Public Schools
- CEEB code: 140800
- Principal: Tiffany G. Gore
- Grades: 9–12
- Gender: Coed
- Enrollment: 83 (2025–2026)
- Campus type: Urban
- Colors: Maroon; White
- Athletics conference: Chicago Public League
- Team name: Huskies
- Accreditation: North Central Association of Colleges and Schools
- Yearbook: The Maroon
- Website: hirschmetrohs.org

Emil G. Hirsch Metropolitan High School (formerly known as Emil G. Hirsch Metropolitan High School of Communications) is a public 4–year high school located in the Greater Grand Crossing neighborhood on the South Side of Chicago, Illinois, United States. Opened in 1926, Hirsch is operated by the Chicago Public Schools district. Hirsch is named for Reform Movement Rabbi Emil Gustav Hirsch.

== History ==
Planned and constructed by Chicago School Superintendent William A. McAndrew and architect Edgar D. Martin between August 1925 to Mid–1926, Hirsch opened as Emil G. Hirsch Junior High School, a junior high school serving grades seventh through ninth in 1926. Costing a total of $1,250,000 to construct, Hirsch was planned under the Chicago Board of Education new junior high school system which included north side school Sullivan High School with its interior and exterior designed identical to Hirsch's. The school board voted to close all junior high schools in 1933 and turned Hirsch into a neighborhood high school (also known at the time as a "senior" high school). The school was named Emil G. Hirsch Metropolitan High School of Communications from 1982 until 2004.

== Athletics ==
Hirsch competes in the Chicago Public League (CPL) and is a member of the Illinois High School Association (IHSA). The school sports teams are nicknamed the Huskies. Hirsch boys' basketball team became Public League champions and state champions in 1972–73.

== Notable alumni ==
- Timothy C. Evans (1961) — politician, attorney, former alderman and the current Chief Judge of the Cook County Circuit Court.
- Rickey Green (1973) — NBA basketball player, selected in the first round 1977 draft (Golden State Warriors).
- Jennifer Jackson (1963) — Model, first African–American Playboy playmate of the month (March, 1965).
- Jayson "Mick" Jenkins (2009) — hip-hop recording artist
- James Singleton (1999) – NBA basketball player, basketball player for (Los Angeles Clippers) (Dallas Mavericks)
- William "Bill" Tabbert (October 5, 1919 – October 18, 1974) was an American actor and singer primarily remembered as Lieutenant Joseph Cable in the original Broadway production of Rodgers and Hammerstein’s musical South Pacific.
- Marvell Wynne (1977) — MLB player (Pittsburgh Pirates, San Diego Padres, Chicago Cubs).
