= Beaulieu, Nièvre =

Beaulieu
- Commune
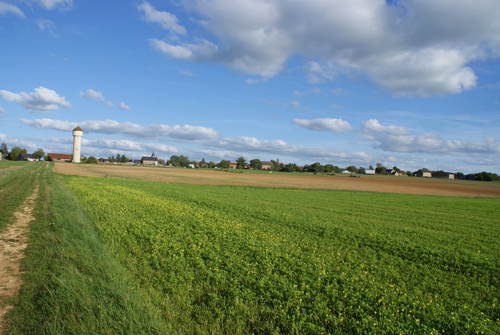
- A general view of Beaulieu
- Location of Beaulieu
- Location within France Location within Bourgogne-Franche-Comté
- Coordinates: 47°15′25″N 3°31′41″E
- Country: France
- Region: Bourgogne-Franche-Comté
- Department: Nièvre
- Arrondissement: Clamecy
- Canton: Corbigny

Government
  - Mayor (2020–2026): Bertrand Ravoir
- Area^{1}: 15.54 km^{2} (6.00 sq mi)
- Highest elevation: 296 m (971 ft)
- Lowest elevation: 218 m (715 ft)
- Population (2023): 142
  - Density: 9.14/km^{2} (23.7/sq mi)
- Time zone: UTC+01:00 (CET)
  - Summer (DST): UTC+02:00 (CEST)
- INSEE/Postal code: 58026 /58420
- ^{1} French Land Register data, which excludes lakes, ponds, glaciers > 1 km^{2} (0.386 sq mi or 247 acres) and river estuaries.

Beaulieu (French pronunciation: [boljø]) is a commune in the Nièvre department in central France. On 1 January 2016, the former communes Dompierre-sur-Héry and Michaugues were merged into Beaulieu.

== Population ==
Historical population
Year	Pop.	±% p.a.
1968	239	—
1975	221	−1.11%
1982	198	−1.56%
1990	172	−1.74%
1999	183	+0.69%
2007	173	−0.70%
2012	169	−0.47%
2017	159	−1.21%
2023	142	−1.87%
Source: INSEE

== See also ==
- Communes of the Nièvre department
