= Michaugues =

- Delegated commune of Beaulieu
- Location of Michaugues
- Location within France Location within Bourgogne-Franche-Comté
- Coordinates: 47°16′10″N 3°31′17″E
- Country: France
- Region: Bourgogne-Franche-Comté
- Department: Nièvre
- Arrondissement: Clamecy
- Canton: Corbigny
- Commune: Beaulieu
- Area^{1}: 4.48 km^{2} (1.73 sq mi)
- Highest elevation: 306 m (1,004 ft)
- Lowest elevation: 209 m (686 ft)
- Population (2022): 47
  - Density: 10/km^{2} (27/sq mi)
- Time zone: UTC+01:00 (CET)
  - Summer (DST): UTC+02:00 (CEST)
- Postal code: 58420
- ^{1} French Land Register data, which excludes lakes, ponds, glaciers > 1 km^{2} (0.386 sq mi or 247 acres) and river estuaries.

Michaugues is a former commune in the Nièvre department in central France. On 1 January 2016, it was merged into the commune Beaulieu, of which it became a delegated commune. In 2022, the estimated population was 47.

== See also ==
- Communes of the Nièvre department
