= Dampier =

Dampier may refer to several places named for English seaman William Dampier:

- Dampier, Western Australia, a port in the Pilbara region of Australia
- Dampier County, one of the 141 cadastral divisions of New South Wales in Australia
- Dampier Land District, a cadastral division of Western Australia
- Dampier Peninsula, a peninsula in the Kimberley region of Australia
- Dampier Archipelago, Western Australia
- Dampier Island, former name of Burrup Peninsula, part of the archipelago
- Division of Dampier, an electoral division in Western Australia from 1913 to 1922
- Mount Dampier, the third peak in South Island of New Zealand
- Dampier Strait (Indonesia)
- Dampier Strait (Papua New Guinea)
- Dampier Ridge, part of the submerged continent of Zealandia
- Dampier Seamount, off the island of Saint Helena
- 14876 Dampier, a minor planet
- HMS Dampier, British frigate (1948–1968)

For other people named Dampier, see

- Dampier (surname)
