= Dampierre =

Dampierre is the name of several communes in France:

- Dampierre, Aube, in the Aube département
- Dampierre, Calvados, in the Calvados département (Normandie)
- Dampierre, Haute-Marne, in the Haute-Marne département
- Dampierre, Jura, in the Jura département
- Dampierre-au-Temple,
- Dampierre-en-Bray,
- Dampierre-en-Bresse,
- Dampierre-en-Burly,
- Dampierre-en-Crot,
- Dampierre-en-Graçay, in the Cher département
- Dampierre-en-Montagne,
- Dampierre-en-Yvelines, in the Yvelines département (Île-de-France)
- Dampierre-et-Flée,
- Dampierre-le-Château, in the Marne département
- Dampierre-les-Bois,
- Dampierre-lès-Conflans,
- Dampierre-Saint-Nicolas,
- Dampierre-sous-Bouhy,
- Dampierre-sous-Brou,
- Dampierre-sur-Auve,
- Dampierre-sur-Avre, in the Eure-et-Loir département
- Dampierre-sur-Blévy,
- Dampierre-sur-Boutonne, in the Charente-Maritime département
- Dampierre-sur-le-Doubs,
- Dampierre-sur-Linotte,
- Dampierre-sur-Loire,
- Dampierre-sur-Moivre,
- Dampierre-sur-Salon,
- Dampierre-sur-Vingeanne,
- Le Vieil-Dampierre.

Other meanings:

- Auguste Marie Henri Picot de Dampierre (1756–1793), general of the French Revolution
- Emmanuelle de Dampierre (1913–2012), member of the Spanish royal family
- Sylvaine Dampierre, French documentary filmmaker of Guadeloupean descent
- House of Dampierre, an important family during the Middle Ages
- Château de Dampierre, a castle in Dampierre-en-Yvelines
- Dampierre (Soulcalibur), a character in the Soul series of video games

== See also ==
- Dompierre (disambiguation)
- Dampier
- Isaac ben Samuel of Dampierre
