= 2008–09 Dallas Mavericks season =

NBA professional basketball team season

- Head coach: Rick Carlisle
- President: Donnie Nelson
- General manager: Donnie Nelson
- Owner: Mark Cuban
- Arena: American Airlines Center

Results
- Record: 50–32 (.610)
- Place: Division: 3rd (Southwest); Conference: 6th (Western)
- Playoff finish: Conference Semifinals (lost to Nuggets 1–4)
- Stats at Basketball Reference

Local media
- Television: Fox Sports Southwest; KTXA
- Radio: KESN

The 2008–09 Dallas Mavericks season was the 29th season of the franchise in the National Basketball Association (NBA). The season marked by the arrival of former NBA Coach of the Year, Rick Carlisle who was hired on May 9, 2008, following the firing of Avery Johnson after the 2008 NBA playoffs.

Finishing at 50–32 as the number six seed, the Mavericks defeated the San Antonio Spurs in the opening round of the playoffs in five games to advance to the conference semi-finals for the first time since 2006. They were, however, unable to defeat the Carmelo Anthony-led Denver Nuggets in the next round as they lost in five games. The Nuggets would go on to the conference finals, where they lost to the eventual champion Los Angeles Lakers in six games.

== Key dates ==
- June 26: The 2008 NBA draft will take place in New York City.
- July 1: The free agency period will start.

== Draft picks ==
Round	Pick	Player	Position	Nationality	College
2	51	Shan Foster	SG/SF	United States	Vanderbilt University

== Roster ==
2008–09 Dallas Mavericks final roster
Players
Coaches

Pos.	#	Name	Height	Weight	DOB (Y–M–D)	From
PG	11	JJ Barea	5 ft 10 in (1.78 m)	175 lb (79 kg)		Northeastern
F/C	32	Brandon Bass	6 ft 8 in (2.03 m)	240 lb (109 kg)		LSU
SG	13	Matt Carroll	6 ft 6 in (1.98 m)	212 lb (96 kg)		Notre Dame
C	25	Erick Dampier	6 ft 11 in (2.11 m)	265 lb (120 kg)		Mississippi State
G/F	40	Devean George (injured)	6 ft 8 in (2.03 m)	235 lb (107 kg)		Augsburg
G/F	8	Gerald Green	6 ft 8 in (2.03 m)	200 lb (91 kg)		Gulf Shores Academy
C	1	Ryan Hollins	7 ft 0 in (2.13 m)	230 lb (104 kg)		UCLA
G/F	5	Josh Howard	6 ft 7 in (2.01 m)	210 lb (95 kg)		Wake Forest
G	2	Jason Kidd	6 ft 4 in (1.93 m)	210 lb (95 kg)		California
F	41	Dirk Nowitzki	7 ft 0 in (2.13 m)	245 lb (111 kg)		Germany
F	33	James Singleton	6 ft 8 in (2.03 m)	230 lb (104 kg)		Murray State
G/F	42	Jerry Stackhouse (injured)	6 ft 6 in (1.98 m)	218 lb (99 kg)		North Carolina
G	31	Jason Terry	6 ft 2 in (1.88 m)	180 lb (82 kg)		Arizona
F	4	Shawne Williams	6 ft 9 in (2.06 m)	225 lb (102 kg)		Memphis
G/F	21	Antoine Wright	6 ft 7 in (2.01 m)	215 lb (98 kg)		Texas A&M

Head coach
- Rick Carlisle (Virginia)
Assistant(s)
- Mario Elie (American International)
- Dwane Casey (Kentucky)
- Terry Stotts (Oklahoma)
- Tom Sterner (Millersville)
- Darrell Armstrong (Fayetteville State)

Legend
- (DP) Unsigned draft pick
- (FA) Free agent
- (S) Suspended
- Injured

Roster
Updated: 2009-01-16

== Regular season ==
=== Standings ===
Southwest Division	W	L	PCT	GB	Home	Road	Div
y-San Antonio Spurs	54	28	.659	—	28–13	26–15	10–6
x-Houston Rockets	53	29	.646	1	33–8	20–21	9–7
x-Dallas Mavericks	50	32	.610	4	32–9	18–23	7–9
x-New Orleans Hornets	49	33	.598	5	28–13	21–20	9–7
Memphis Grizzlies	24	58	.284	30	16–25	8–33	5–11

#	Western Conference				
#	Team	W	L	PCT	GB
1	c-Los Angeles Lakers	65	17	.793	—
2	y-Denver Nuggets	54	28	.659	11
3	y-San Antonio Spurs	54	28	.659	11
4	x-Portland Trail Blazers	54	28	.659	11
5	x-Houston Rockets	53	29	.646	12
6	x-Dallas Mavericks	50	32	.610	15
7	x-New Orleans Hornets	49	33	.598	16
8	x-Utah Jazz	48	34	.585	17
9	Phoenix Suns	46	36	.561	19
10	Golden State Warriors	29	53	.354	36
11	Memphis Grizzlies	24	58	.293	41
12	Minnesota Timberwolves	24	58	.293	41
13	Oklahoma City Thunder	23	59	.280	42
14	Los Angeles Clippers	19	63	.232	46
15	Sacramento Kings	17	65	.207	48

=== Game log ===
2008–09 game log
October: 0–1 (home: 0–1; road: 0–0)

Game	Date	Team	Score	High points	High rebounds	High assists	Location Attendance	Record
1	October 30	Houston	L 102–112	Dirk Nowitzki (36)	Josh Howard (11)	Jason Kidd (12)	American Airlines Center; 20,066	0–1

November: 8–7 (home: 2–3; road: 6–4)

Game	Date	Team	Score	High points	High rebounds	High assists	Location Attendance	Record
2	November 1	@ Minnesota	W 95–85	Dirk Nowitzki (21)	Jason Kidd (9)	Jason Kidd (7)	Target Center; 16,893	1–1
3	November 3	Cleveland	L 81–100	Josh Howard (18)	DeSagana Diop (9)	Jason Kidd (6)	American Airlines Center; 19,923	1–2
4	November 4	@ San Antonio	W 98–81	Dirk Nowitzki (30)	Josh Howard (12)	Jason Kidd (10)	AT&T Center; 17,398	2–2
5	November 7	@ Denver	L 105–108	Dirk Nowitzki (23)	Dirk Nowitzki, Jason Kidd, Brandon Bass (10)	Jason Kidd (9)	Pepsi Center; 19,175	2–3
6	November 9	@ L.A. Clippers	L 92–103	Dirk Nowitzki (33)	Gerald Green (12)	Jason Kidd (9)	Staples Center; 14,249	2–4
7	November 11	L.A. Lakers	L 99–106	Jason Terry (21)	Erick Dampier (16)	Jason Kidd (10)	American Airlines Center; 20,391	2–5
8	November 13	@ Chicago	L 91–98	Josh Howard (21)	Erick Dampier (18)	Dirk Nowitzki (5)	United Center; 21,751	2–6
9	November 14	Orlando	L 100–102	Josh Howard (25)	Josh Howard, Erick Dampier (9)	Jason Kidd (6)	American Airlines Center; 20,085	2–7
10	November 16	@ New York	W 124–114 (OT)	Dirk Nowitzki (39)	Dirk Nowitzki (15)	Jason Kidd (9)	Madison Square Garden; 19,271	3–7
11	November 18	@ Charlotte	W 100–83	Dirk Nowitzki (32)	Erick Dampier (11)	Jason Kidd (10)	Time Warner Cable Arena; 10,935	4–7
12	November 19	@ Houston	W 96–86	Jason Terry (31)	Dirk Nowitzki (12)	Jason Kidd (7)	Toyota Center; 18,203	5–7
13	November 21	Memphis	W 91–76	Dirk Nowitzki (25)	Jason Kidd (13)	Jason Kidd (6)	American Airlines Center; 20,035	6–7
14	November 25	Indiana	W 109–106	Jason Terry (29)	Dirk Nowitzki (12)	Jason Kidd (13)	American Airlines Center; 19,996	7–7
15	November 28	@ L.A. Lakers	L 107–114	Jason Terry (29)	Dirk Nowitzki (12)	Jason Kidd (11)	Staples Center; 18,997	7–8
16	November 29	@ Sacramento	W 101–78	Jason Terry (24)	Erick Dampier (13)	Jason Kidd (8)	ARCO Arena; 12,650	8–8

December: 11–4 (home: 7–2; road: 4–2)

Game	Date	Team	Score	High points	High rebounds	High assists	Location Attendance	Record
17	December 2	L.A. Clippers	W 100–98	Dirk Nowitzki (29)	Dirk Nowitzki (10)	Jason Kidd (8)	American Airlines Center; 19,670	9–8
18	December 4	Phoenix	W 112–97	Dirk Nowitzki (39)	Erick Dampier (14)	Jason Kidd (8)	American Airlines Center; 19,813	10–8
19	December 6	Atlanta	W 100–98	Dirk Nowitzki (24)	Dirk Nowitzki, Erick Dampier (11)	Jason Kidd (8)	American Airlines Center; 19,966	11–8
20	December 9	San Antonio	L 126–133 (2OT)	Dirk Nowitzki (35)	Dirk Nowitzki (10)	Jason Kidd (12)	American Airlines Center; 19,937	11–9
21	December 11	Charlotte	W 95–90	Jason Terry (26)	Dirk Nowitzki (13)	Jason Kidd (7)	American Airlines Center; 19,736	12–9
22	December 13	Oklahoma City	W 103–99	Dirk Nowitzki (46)	Brandon Bass (9)	Jason Kidd (7)	American Airlines Center; 20,190	13–9
23	December 15	Denver	L 88–98	Dirk Nowitzki (27)	Erick Dampier (15)	José Juan Barea (9)	American Airlines Center; 19,969	13–10
24	December 17	@ Toronto	W 96–86	Jason Terry, Dirk Nowitzki (27)	Dirk Nowitzki (10)	Jason Terry (8)	Air Canada Centre; 18,832	14–10
25	December 19	@ New Jersey	L 97–121	Dirk Nowitzki (24)	Erick Dampier (7)	Jason Kidd (7)	Izod Center; 9,889	14–11
26	December 21	@ Washington	W 97–86	Jason Terry (25)	James Singleton (13)	Jason Kidd (11)	Verizon Center; 15,582	15–11
27	December 23	Memphis	W 100–82	Dirk Nowitzki (21)	Erick Dampier (9)	Jason Kidd (11)	American Airlines Center; 20,200	16–11
28	December 25	@ Portland	W 102–94	Dirk Nowitzki (30)	Jason Kidd (12)	Jason Kidd (10)	Rose Garden; 20,643	17–11
29	December 26	@ Utah	L 88–97	Jason Terry (26)	Jason Kidd, Dirk Nowitzki, Erick Dampier (8)	Jason Kidd (9)	EnergySolutions Arena; 19,911	17–12
30	December 28	@ L.A. Clippers	W 98–76	Josh Howard (29)	Brandon Bass, Josh Howard, Erick Dampier (9)	Josh Howard (7)	Staples Center; 16,685	18–12
31	December 30	Minnesota	W 107–100	Jason Terry (29)	Dirk Nowitzki (13)	Jason Kidd (16)	American Airlines Center; 20,264	19–12

January: 8–7 (home: 5–1; road: 3–6)

Game	Date	Team	Score	High points	High rebounds	High assists	Location Attendance	Record
32	January 2	Philadelphia	W 96–86	Dirk Nowitzki (31)	Erick Dampier (14)	Jason Kidd (9)	American Airlines Center; 20,327	20–12
33	January 4	@ Memphis	L 82–102	Dirk Nowitzki (28)	José Juan Barea, Jason Kidd (6)	Jason Kidd (5)	FedExForum; 11,731	20–13
34	January 6	L.A. Clippers	W 107–102	Dirk Nowitzki (34)	Jason Kidd (10)	José Juan Barea, Jason Kidd (8)	American Airlines Center; 19,794	21–13
35	January 8	New York	W 99–94	Josh Howard (19)	Brandon Bass (11)	Dirk Nowitzki (7)	American Airlines Center; 19,779	22–13
36	January 9	@ Phoenix	L 100–128	Dirk Nowitzki (19)	Dirk Nowitzki (7)	Jason Kidd (7)	US Airways Center; 18,422	22–14
37	January 11	@ Sacramento	L 95–102	Jason Terry (33)	Dirk Nowitzki (8)	Jason Kidd (7)	ARCO Arena; 12,294	22–15
38	January 13	@ Denver	L 97–99	Dirk Nowitzki (44)	Dirk Nowitzki (14)	Jason Kidd (7)	Pepsi Center; 14,158	22–16
39	January 14	New Orleans	L 97–104	Jason Terry (28)	Dirk Nowitzki (13)	Jason Kidd (7)	American Airlines Center; 19,947	22–17
40	January 17	Utah	W 115–108	Dirk Nowitzki (39)	Brandon Bass (9)	Jason Kidd (15)	American Airlines Center; 20,325	23–17
41	January 19	@ Philadelphia	W 95–93	Dirk Nowitzki (24)	Jason Kidd (12)	Jason Kidd (6)	Wachovia Center; 14,503	24–17
42	January 21	@ Milwaukee	L 99–133	Dirk Nowitzki (30)	Erick Dampier (8)	Jason Terry (5)	Bradley Center; 13,898	24–18
43	January 23	@ Detroit	W 112–91	Dirk Nowitzki (26)	Dirk Nowitzki (7)	Jason Kidd (10)	The Palace of Auburn Hills; 22,076	25–18
44	January 25	@ Boston	L 100–124	Jason Terry (27)	Dirk Nowitzki, Erick Dampier, Jason Kidd (7)	Jason Kidd (5)	TD Banknorth Garden; 18,624	25–19
45	January 28	Golden State	W 117–93	Jason Terry (22)	Brandon Bass, Erick Dampier (11)	Jason Kidd (9)	American Airlines Center; 19,864	26–19
46	January 31	@ Miami	W 111–96	Dirk Nowitzki (30)	Dirk Nowitzki (7)	Jason Kidd (11)	American Airlines Arena; 19,600	27–19

February: 8–4 (home: 7–1; road: 1–3)

Game	Date	Team	Score	High points	High rebounds	High assists	Location Attendance	Record
47	February 2	@ Orlando	W 105–95	Dirk Nowitzki (29)	Erick Dampier (7)	Jason Kidd (8)	Amway Arena; 16,551	28–19
48	February 4	Portland	W 104–99	Josh Howard (23)	Dirk Nowitzki (11)	Jason Kidd (10)	American Airlines Center; 19,767	29–19
49	February 5	@ Utah	L 87–115	Josh Howard (18)	Dirk Nowitzki (6)	Jason Kidd (8)	EnergySolutions Arena; 19,911	29–20
50	February 7	Chicago	W 115–114 (OT)	Dirk Nowitzki (44)	Erick Dampier (10)	Jason Kidd (10)	American Airlines Center; 20,349	30–20
51	February 10	Sacramento	W 118–100	Antoine Wright, Josh Howard (23)	Erick Dampier (16)	Jason Kidd (12)	American Airlines Center; 19,667	31–20
52	February 12	Boston	L 92–99	Dirk Nowitzki (37)	Dirk Nowitzki (8)	Jason Kidd (10)	American Airlines Center; 20,285	31–21
53	February 18	New Jersey	W 113–98	Josh Howard (24)	Josh Howard (10)	Jason Kidd (10)	American Airlines Center; 19,878	32–21
54	February 20	@ Houston	L 86–93	José Juan Barea (26)	Dirk Nowitzki (11)	José Juan Barea, Jason Kidd (5)	Toyota Center; 18,195	32–22
55	February 21	Sacramento	W 116–95	Brandon Bass, Josh Howard (20)	James Singleton (12)	Jason Kidd (11)	American Airlines Center; 20,223	33–22
56	February 24	@ San Antonio	L 76–93	Josh Howard (19)	James Singleton (14)	Jason Kidd (4)	AT&T Center; 18,797	33–23
57	February 25	Milwaukee	W 116–96	Josh Howard (27)	Brandon Bass (11)	Jason Kidd (9)	American Airlines Center; 19,558	34–23
58	February 27	Oklahoma City	W 110–108 (OT)	Dirk Nowitzki (41)	Dirk Nowitzki, James Singleton (9)	Jason Kidd (13)	American Airlines Center; 20,007	35–23

March: 9–7 (home: 5–1; road: 4–6)

Game	Date	Team	Score	High points	High rebounds	High assists	Location Attendance	Record
59	March 1	Toronto	W 109–98	Dirk Nowitzki (24)	James Singleton (16)	Jason Kidd (15)	American Airlines Center; 19,688	36–23
60	March 2	@ Oklahoma City	L 87–96	Dirk Nowitzki (28)	James Singleton (6)	Dirk Nowitzki (6)	Ford Center; 18,527	36–24
61	March 4	San Antonio	W 107–102	Josh Howard (29)	Dirk Nowitzki (12)	Jason Kidd (9)	American Airlines Center; 20,316	37–24
62	March 5	@ New Orleans	L 88–104	Dirk Nowitzki (27)	Erick Dampier (9)	Jason Terry (4)	New Orleans Arena; 17,230	37–25
63	March 7	Washington	W 119–103	Dirk Nowitzki (34)	Dirk Nowitzki (9)	Jason Kidd (11)	American Airlines Center; 20,150	38–25
64	March 10	@ Phoenix	W 122–117	Dirk Nowitzki (34)	Dirk Nowitzki (13)	Dirk Nowitzki, José Juan Barea (4)	US Airways Center; 18,422	39–25
65	March 11	@ Portland	W 93–89	Dirk Nowitzki (29)	Dirk Nowitzki, Jason Kidd (10)	Jason Kidd (10)	Rose Garden; 20,286	40–25
66	March 13	@ Golden State	L 110–119	Dirk Nowitzki (27)	James Singleton (11)	Jason Kidd (11)	Oracle Arena; 18,751	40–26
67	March 15	@ L.A. Lakers	L 100–107	Jason Terry (29)	James Singleton (10)	Jason Kidd (9)	Staples Center; 18,997	40–27
68	March 17	Detroit	W 103–101	Dirk Nowitzki (30)	Erick Dampier (13)	José Juan Barea (8)	American Airlines Center; 20,427	41–27
69	March 19	@ Atlanta	L 87–95	Dirk Nowitzki (23)	Dirk Nowitzki (12)	Jason Kidd (6)	Philips Arena; 17,499	41–28
70	March 20	@ Indiana	W 94–92	Dirk Nowitzki (23)	James Singleton (11)	José Juan Barea (6)	Conseco Fieldhouse; 17,232	42–28
71	March 25	Golden State	W 128–106	Jason Terry, Dirk Nowitzki (26)	Erick Dampier (10)	José Juan Barea, Jason Kidd (7)	American Airlines Center; 19,862	43–28
72	March 27	Denver	L 101–103	Dirk Nowitzki (26)	Dirk Nowitzki (11)	José Juan Barea, Jason Terry (4)	American Airlines Center; 20,310	43–29
73	March 29	@ Cleveland	L 74–102	Dirk Nowitzki (20)	Ryan Hollins (12)	Jason Kidd (8)	Quicken Loans Arena; 20,562	43–30
74	March 31	@ Minnesota	W 108–88	Dirk Nowitzki (23)	Dirk Nowitzki (12)	Jason Kidd (13)	Target Center; 12,111	44–30

April: 5–2 (home: 5–0; road: 0–2)

Game	Date	Team	Score	High points	High rebounds	High assists	Location Attendance	Record
75	April 1	Miami	W 98–96	Dirk Nowitzki (30)	Josh Howard, Brandon Bass (8)	Jason Kidd (11)	American Airlines Center; 20,021	45–30
76	April 3	@ Memphis	L 102–107	Dirk Nowitzki (35)	Dirk Nowitzki (9)	Jason Kidd (10)	FedExForum; 15,126	45–31
77	April 5	Phoenix	W 140–116	Dirk Nowitzki (28)	James Singleton, Brandon Bass (6)	Jason Kidd (20)	American Airlines Center; 20,301	46–31
78	April 8	Utah	W 130–101	Dirk Nowitzki (31)	Erick Dampier (10)	Jason Kidd (10)	American Airlines Center; 20,017	47–31
79	April 10	New Orleans	W 100–92	Dirk Nowitzki, Josh Howard (25)	Brandon Bass (13)	Jason Kidd (15)	American Airlines Center; 20,370	48–31
80	April 12	@ New Orleans	L 92–102	Dirk Nowitzki (29)	Dirk Nowitzki (14)	Jason Kidd (6)	New Orleans Arena; 16,640	48–32
81	April 13	Minnesota	W 96–94	Dirk Nowitzki (34)	Erick Dampier (13)	Jason Kidd (8)	American Airlines Center; 19,900	49–32
82	April 15	Houston	W 95–84	Jason Terry (23)	Dirk Nowitzki (15)	Jason Kidd (12)	American Airlines Center; 20,350	50–32

2008–09 schedule

== Playoffs ==
2009 playoff game log
First Round: 4–1 (home: 2–0; road: 2–1)

Game	Date	Team	Score	High points	High rebounds	High assists	Location Attendance	Series
1	April 18	@ San Antonio	W 105–97	Josh Howard (25)	Erick Dampier (11)	Jason Kidd (5)	AT&T Center; 18,797	1–0
2	April 20	@ San Antonio	L 84–105	Jason Terry (16)	Dirk Nowitzki (6)	Jason Kidd (5)	AT&T Center; 18,797	1–1
3	April 23	San Antonio	W 88–67	Dirk Nowitzki (20)	Erick Dampier (9)	José Juan Barea (6)	American Airlines Center; 20,491	2–1
4	April 25	San Antonio	W 99–90	Josh Howard (28)	Dirk Nowitzki (13)	Jason Kidd (7)	American Airlines Center; 20,829	3–1
5	April 28	@ San Antonio	W 106–93	Dirk Nowitzki (31)	Erick Dampier (12)	Jason Kidd (6)	AT&T Center; 18,797	4–1

Conference Semifinals: 1–4 (home: 1–1; road: 0–3)

Game	Date	Team	Score	High points	High rebounds	High assists	Location Attendance	Series
1	May 3	@ Denver	L 95–109	Dirk Nowitzki (28)	Dirk Nowitzki (10)	José Juan Barea (5)	Pepsi Center; 19,631	0–1
2	May 5	@ Denver	L 105–117	Dirk Nowitzki (35)	Dirk Nowitzki (9)	Jason Kidd (7)	Pepsi Center; 19,890	0–2
3	May 9	Denver	L 105–106	Dirk Nowitzki (33)	Dirk Nowitzki (16)	Jason Kidd (5)	American Airlines Center; 20,620	0–3
4	May 11	Denver	W 119–117	Dirk Nowitzki (44)	Dirk Nowitzki (13)	Jason Kidd (6)	American Airlines Center; 20,523	1–3
5	May 13	@ Denver	L 110–124	Dirk Nowitzki (32)	Dirk Nowitzki (10)	Jason Kidd (9)	Pepsi Center; 19,962	1–4

2009 schedule

== Awards and records ==
=== Awards ===
==== Week/Month ====
- Dirk Nowitzki was named Western Conference Player of the Week for games played from November 23 through November 29.
- Dirk Nowitzki was named Western Conference Player of the Week for games played from December 7 through December 13.
- Dirk Nowitzki was named Western Conference Player of the Month for games played in April.

==== All-Star ====
- Dirk Nowitzki was voted to his 8th NBA All-Star Game.

==== Season ====
- Jason Terry, NBA Sixth Man of the Year Award
- Dirk Nowitzki, 1st Team All-NBA

== Player statistics ==
=== Ragular season ===
Player	POS	GP	GS	MP	REB	AST	STL	BLK	PTS	MPG	RPG	APG	SPG	BPG	PPG
Dirk Nowitzki	PF	81	81	3,050	681	197	61	63	2,094	37.7	8.4	2.4	.8	.8	25.9
Jason Kidd	PG	81	81	2,886	500	702	160	39	731	35.6	6.2	8.7	2.0	.5	9.0
Brandon Bass	C	81	0	1,574	367	43	27	55	686	19.4	4.5	.5	.3	.7	8.5
Erick Dampier	C	80	80	1,836	565	77	24	95	454	23.0	7.1	1.0	.3	1.2	5.7
J. J. Barea	SG	79	15	1,600	177	269	37	5	617	20.3	2.2	3.4	.5	.1	7.8
Jason Terry	SG	74	11	2,491	177	251	97	20	1,447	33.7	2.4	3.4	1.3	.3	19.6
Antoine Wright	SF	65	53	1,552	136	77	46	27	474	23.9	2.1	1.2	.7	.4	7.3
James Singleton	PF	62	6	884	250	17	26	28	314	14.3	4.0	.3	.4	.5	5.1
Josh Howard	SF	52	51	1,663	263	83	55	30	936	32.0	5.1	1.6	1.1	.6	18.0
Devean George	SF	43	17	708	78	15	23	11	147	16.5	1.8	.3	.5	.3	3.4
Gerald Green	SG	38	12	376	54	15	10	5	199	9.9	1.4	.4	.3	.1	5.2
DeSagana Diop^{†}	C	34	0	452	118	13	12	25	56	13.3	3.5	.4	.4	.7	1.6
Ryan Hollins^{†}	C	27	2	260	61	3	4	15	79	9.6	2.3	.1	.1	.6	2.9
Matt Carroll^{†}	SG	21	0	141	14	3	3	1	25	6.7	.7	.1	.1	.0	1.2
Shawne Williams	SF	15	0	170	46	2	2	9	42	11.3	3.1	.1	.1	.6	2.8
Jerry Stackhouse	SG	10	1	162	17	12	4	1	42	16.2	1.7	1.2	.4	.1	4.2

- ^{†} Denotes player spent time with another team in the season. Stats reflect time with the Mavericks only.

=== Playoffs ===
Player	POS	GP	GS	MP	REB	AST	STL	BLK	PTS	MPG	RPG	APG	SPG	BPG	PPG
Dirk Nowitzki	PF	10	10	394	101	31	9	8	268	39.4	10.1	3.1	.9	.8	26.8
Jason Kidd	PG	10	10	386	58	59	22	3	114	38.6	5.8	5.9	2.2	.3	11.4
Josh Howard	SF	10	10	295	51	13	9	4	158	29.5	5.1	1.3	.9	.4	15.8
Erick Dampier	C	10	10	255	61	7	4	9	57	25.5	6.1	.7	.4	.9	5.7
Antoine Wright	SF	10	5	167	13	10	3	2	59	16.7	1.3	1.0	.3	.2	5.9
J. J. Barea	SG	10	4	221	20	34	3	0	76	22.1	2.0	3.4	.3	.0	7.6
Jason Terry	SG	10	1	325	28	19	6	3	143	32.5	2.8	1.9	.6	.3	14.3
Brandon Bass	C	10	0	192	41	7	7	4	94	19.2	4.1	.7	.7	.4	9.4
Ryan Hollins	C	9	0	84	24	1	1	4	22	9.3	2.7	.1	.1	.4	2.4
James Singleton	PF	9	0	42	6	0	0	1	12	4.7	.7	.0	.0	.1	1.3
Gerald Green	SG	6	0	26	2	0	1	0	11	4.3	.3	.0	.2	.0	1.8
Matt Carroll	SG	4	0	14	2	0	0	0	2	3.5	.5	.0	.0	.0	.5

== Transactions ==
=== Free agents ===
==== Additions ====
Player	Signed	Former team

==== Subtractions ====
Player	Left	New team
