= James Singleton (basketball) =

American basketball player and coach

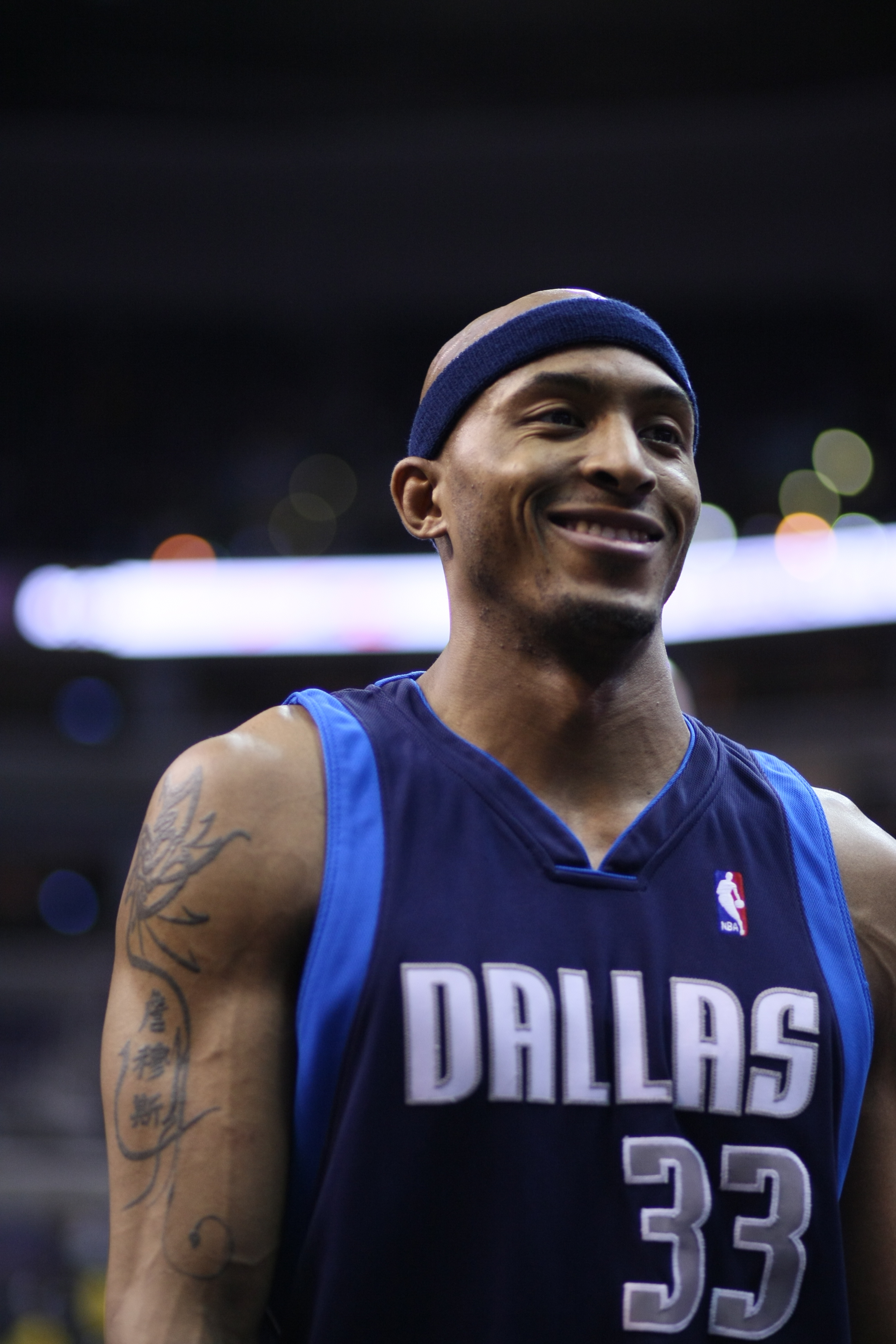
- Singleton with the Dallas Mavericks in 2008

Personal information
- Born: July 20, 1981 (age 45) Chicago, Illinois, U.S.
- Listed height: 6 ft 8 in (2.03 m)
- Listed weight: 230 lb (104 kg)

Career information
- High school: Hirsch Metropolitan (Chicago, Illinois)
- College: Pearl River CC (1999–2001); Murray State (2001–2003)
- NBA draft: 2003: undrafted
- Playing career: 2003–2017
- Position: Small forward / power forward
- Number: 15, 33, 22, 3
- Coaching career: 2017–2021

Career history

Playing
- 2003–2004: Sicc Jesi
- 2004–2005: Armani Jeans Milano
- 2005–2007: Los Angeles Clippers
- 2007–2008: TAU Cerámica
- 2008–2010: Dallas Mavericks
- 2010: Washington Wizards
- 2010–2011: Xinjiang Flying Tigers
- 2011–2012: Guangdong Southern Tigers
- 2012: Washington Wizards
- 2012–2014: Xinjiang Flying Tigers
- 2015: Canton Charge
- 2015: Guaros de Lara
- 2015–2016: Bnei Herzliya
- 2016: Maccabi Kiryat Gat
- 2016–2017: Seoul SK Knights

Coaching
- 2017–2021: Austin Spurs (assistant)

Career highlights
- As player: CBA Slam Dunk leader (2011); Spanish League champion (2008); Italian A2 League Champion (2004); Italian A2 League Player of the Year (2004); Italian A2 League Forward of the Year (2004); Italian A2 League Import of the Year (2004); Italian League All-Star (2005); Italian League All-Star Game MVP (2005); First-team All-OVC (2003); As assistant coach: NBA G League champion (2018)
- Stats at NBA.com
- Stats at Basketball Reference

James Alexander Singleton (born July 20, 1981) is an American former professional basketball player and former assistant coach of the Austin Spurs of the NBA G League. The 6'8" forward played two years of college basketball for Murray State.

== College career ==
During his college career, Singleton, a graduate of Chicago's Hirsch High School, attended Pearl River Community College and Murray State University. In his two years at Murray State, he averaged 13.5 points, 10.5 rebounds and 1.9 blocks in 60 games. He earned second-team All-Ohio Valley Conference honors in 2001–02 and first-team honors in 2002–03. He also led the OVC in rebounds as a senior.

== Professional career ==
Undrafted by an NBA franchise, Singleton began his professional career in Italy playing with the Sicc Cucine Jesi (Lega2) during the 2003–04 season, averaging 20.8 points and 12 rebounds per game. He won the Lega2 title with his team which allowed Jesi there appear in Serie A. He also received Eurobasket All-Italian Lega2 Player of the Year award.

He later signed with the Olimpia Milano (Serie A) team. He averaged 11.5 points, 8.6 rebounds and two steals in 46 games during the 2004–05 season, helping his team reach the Italian SerieA League Finals. He was named Most Valuable Player of the 2005 Italian League All-Star Game. During his tenure, Singleton was a fan favorite for his high-flying acrobatics and his tenacious defense.

He was signed on August 30, 2005, by the Los Angeles Clippers to a two-year contract. This period marked his first appearance in the NBA.

Singleton joined the ACB for the 2007–08 season with TAU Cerámica. He won the ACB title with this team, beating F.C. Barcelona in the Finals (3–0).

Achieving success in Europe again Singleton returned for his second opportunity in the NBA as several teams took notice of his marked improvement. He would end up joining the Dallas Mavericks.

On February 13, 2010, Singleton was traded from the Dallas Mavericks to the Washington Wizards along with Drew Gooden, Josh Howard and Quinton Ross for Caron Butler, Brendan Haywood, and DeShawn Stevenson.

On September 6, 2010, The Washington Post reported that Singleton had rejected a contract offer from the Wizards and signed with the Xinjiang Flying Tigers of the Chinese Basketball Association in which he helped lead the team to the CBA finals.

Singleton joined the Guangdong Southern Tigers for the 2011–12 season and helped lead the team to the CBA Finals. After the CBA season ended, he returned to the Washington Wizards. Later in 2012, he returned to the Xinjiang Flying Tigers signing a two-year contract with the club.

Taking time off from basketball for the birth of his son, Singleton was acquired by the Canton Charge on January 29, 2015. On May 8, he signed with Guaros de Lara of the Venezuelan Liga Profesional de Baloncesto (LPB).

On August 13, 2015, Singleton signed with Bnei Herzliya of the Israeli Ligat HaAl.

On August 7, 2016, he signed with Maccabi Kiryat Gat. He left Kiryat Gat after appearing in eight games, and on December 20, 2016, he signed with Seoul SK Knights of the Korean Basketball League.

== NBA career statistics ==
Legend
GP	Games played	GS	Games started	MPG	Minutes per game
FG%	Field goal percentage	3P%	3-point field goal percentage	FT%	Free throw percentage
RPG	Rebounds per game	APG	Assists per game	SPG	Steals per game
BPG	Blocks per game	PPG	Points per game	**Bold**	Career high

=== Regular season ===
Year	Team	GP	GS	MPG	FG%	3P%	FT%	RPG	APG	SPG	BPG	PPG
2005–06	L.A. Clippers	59	**10**	12.8	.510	**.500**	.780	**3.3**	.5	.3	.4	3.4
2006–07	L.A. Clippers	53	0	7.1	.366	.214	.759	2.0	.3	.3	.3	1.6
2008–09	Dallas	**62**	6	14.3	.529	.325	.859	4.0	.3	.4	.5	5.1
2009–10	Dallas	25	0	8.4	.375	.227	**1.000**	2.2	.4	.4	.3	2.4
2009–10	Washington	32	3	**23.9**	.384	.133	.839	**6.9**	.7	.5	**1.1**	6.1
2011–12	Washington	12	0	21.8	**.547**	.222	.933	6.8	**1.3**	**.8**	.7	**8.2**
**Career**		243	19	13.4	.462	.292	.833	3.7	.4	.4	.5	3.9

=== Playoffs ===
Year	Team	GP	GS	MPG	FG%	3P%	FT%	RPG	APG	SPG	BPG	PPG
2006	L.A. Clippers	7	0	1.7	.333	.000	.000	.4	**.3**	.0	.0	.3
2009	Dallas	**9**	0	**4.7**	**.500**	**.400**	.000	**.7**	.0	.0	**.1**	**1.3**
**Career**		16	0	3.4	.462	.286	.000	.6	.1	.0	.1	.9
