= Josh Howard =

American basketball player (born 1980)

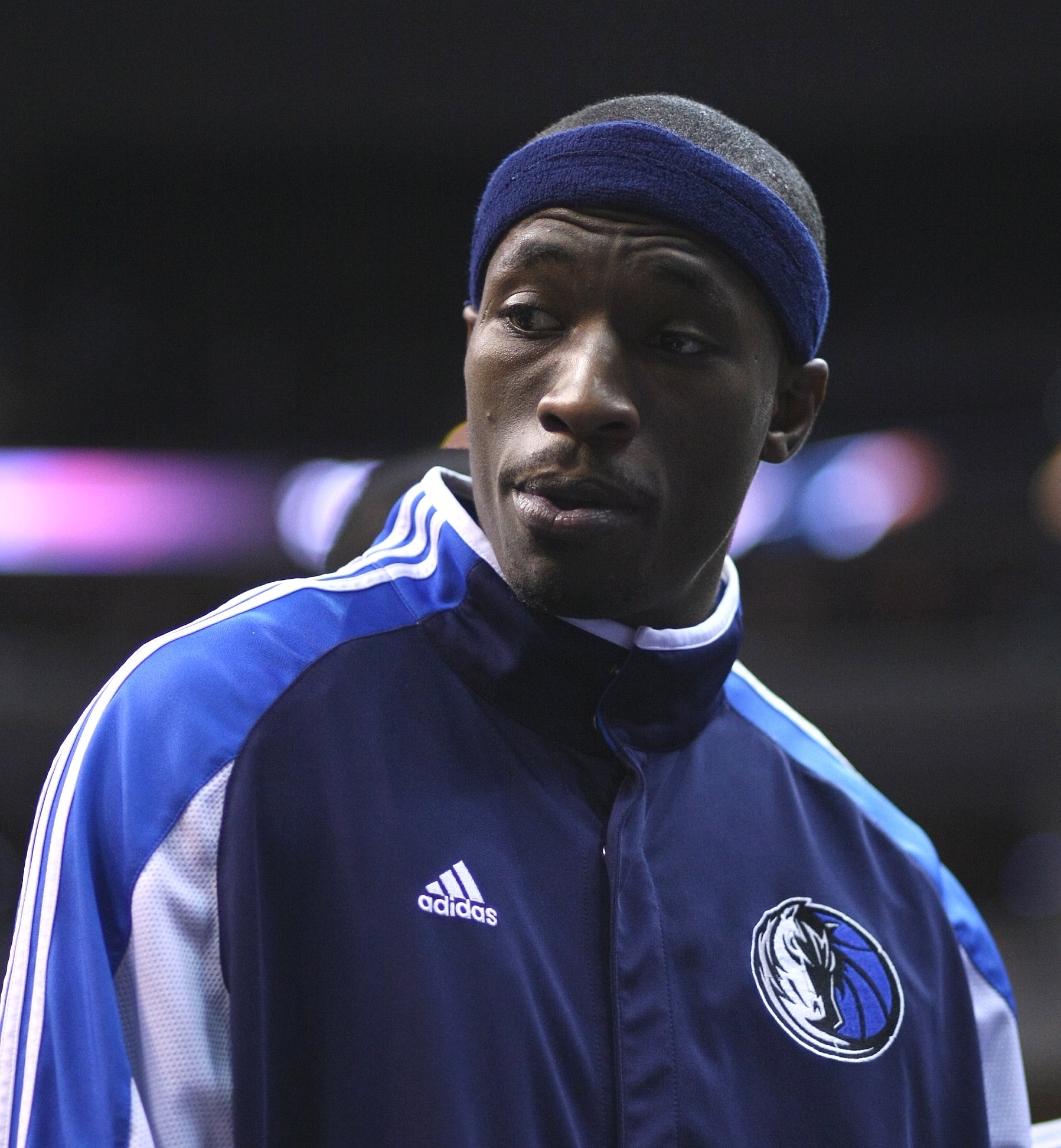
- Howard with the Dallas Mavericks in 2008

UNT Dallas Trailblazers
- Title: Head coach
- League: NAIA

Personal information
- Born: April 28, 1980 (age 46) Winston-Salem, North Carolina, U.S.
- Listed height: 6 ft 7 in (2.01 m)
- Listed weight: 210 lb (95 kg)

Career information
- High school: Robert B. Glenn (Kernersville, North Carolina); Hargrave Military Academy (Chatham, Virginia)
- College: Wake Forest (1999–2003)
- NBA draft: 2003: 1st round, 29th overall pick
- Drafted by: Dallas Mavericks
- Playing career: 2003–2014
- Position: Small forward
- Number: 5, 8
- Coaching career: 2016–present

Career history

Playing
- 2003–2010: Dallas Mavericks
- 2010–2011: Washington Wizards
- 2011–2012: Utah Jazz
- 2012: Minnesota Timberwolves
- 2013–2014: Austin Toros

Career highlights
- NBA All-Star (2007); NBA All-Rookie Second Team (2004); Consensus first-team All-American (2003); ACC Player of the Year (2003); First-team All-ACC (2003); Second-team All-ACC (2001); Third-team All-ACC (2002); ACC All-Defensive Team (2003); No. 5 retired by Wake Forest Demon Deacons

Career NBA statistics
- Points: 7,270 (14.3 ppg)
- Rebounds: 2,886 (5.7 rpg)
- Assists: 817 (1.6 apg)
- Stats at NBA.com
- Stats at Basketball Reference

Joshua Jay Howard (born April 28, 1980) is an American basketball coach and former professional player who is the head coach of the UNT Dallas Trailblazers men's basketball team. He played college basketball for the Wake Forest Demon Deacons. He played 10 seasons in the National Basketball Association (NBA), predominantly with the Dallas Mavericks.

== Early life ==
Howard was born to Kevin Robinson and Nancy Henderson. His father was absent throughout his childhood and Howard was primarily raised by his maternal grandmother, Helen Howard, in Winston-Salem, North Carolina. Howard was born with bowed legs and they had to be broken below the knee and reset twice before his second birthday.

== High school career ==
Howard attended Glenn High School in Kernersville, North Carolina, where he was a First-Team All-State selection in his senior year and averaged six blocks per game while shooting 70%. He also averaged a double-double during his junior and senior years, during which time he also received the Frank Spencer Award (for the top player in Northwest North Carolina) twice. During his senior year Howard was handcuffed outside of a BP gas station the night before his SAT examination. Howard had been loitering on the premises with some of his friends, and undercover cops, believing the teenagers had been selling drugs, detained them.

In order to get into Wake Forest University Howard needed an SAT score of at least 950. He did not get a 950, saying his score was "somewhere in the 500s". In lieu, he spent a year at Hargrave Military Academy in Chatham, Virginia, where he averaged a double-double, with 19.9 points and 10.1 rebounds per game. Howard led Hargrave to a 27–3 record, shooting well on the floor with 56%. He also averaged 44% from behind the three-point line and 85% from the free throw line. Howard participated in the ACC–SEC game between new signings from the two conferences. Howard scored 14 points in 15 minutes to help lift the ACC team to a 145–115 win over the SEC.

== College career ==
Howard chose to sign with Wake Forest in 1999 over many other colleges due to the proximity of the campus to his family and friends. He majored in sociology and minored in international studies. During his first year, Howard played in all thirty-six games, starting in all but two. He led the team with 44 steals and ranked fourth on the team with 9.1 points per game. His season high came in a game against Duke during an ACC tournament. Howard scored 19 points, going 7-for-10 from the field and 2-for-2 from behind the three-point line.

During his sophomore season Howard was selected to second-team All-ACC. He missed a few games because of the flu, playing in 29 games and starting 28. He led the team in scoring that year with 13.6 points per game. Howard earned third-team All-ACC and second team NABC All-District while trailing Darius Songaila in team scoring with 13.9 points per game during his junior season.

Deciding to come back for his senior year at Wake Forest, Howard became the first member of his family to graduate from college. He was the unanimous selection as the Atlantic Coast Conference (ACC) player of the year in 2003 (first since David Thompson in 1975) and led Wake Forest to its first outright regular season league championship in 41 years. He is the second ACC player (after Shane Battier) to amass 1000 points, 500 rebounds, 200 assists, 200 steals, 100 blocks, and 100 three-pointers. Howard was named the national player of the year by FOX, College Insider and Basketball Digest. He was also a finalist for the John R. Wooden Award and the James Naismith Award in 2003. In his senior season, Howard averaged 19.5 ppg, 8.3 rpg, 2.1 apg, and 1.5 bpg, and won multiple awards, including ACC Player of the Year, All ACC First Team, ACC All-Defensive Team, and AP First Team All-America. Coming into the league, Howard was projected as a mid to late 1st round pick in the 2003 NBA Draft because of his apparent lack of upside.

== Professional career ==
=== Dallas Mavericks (2003–2010) ===
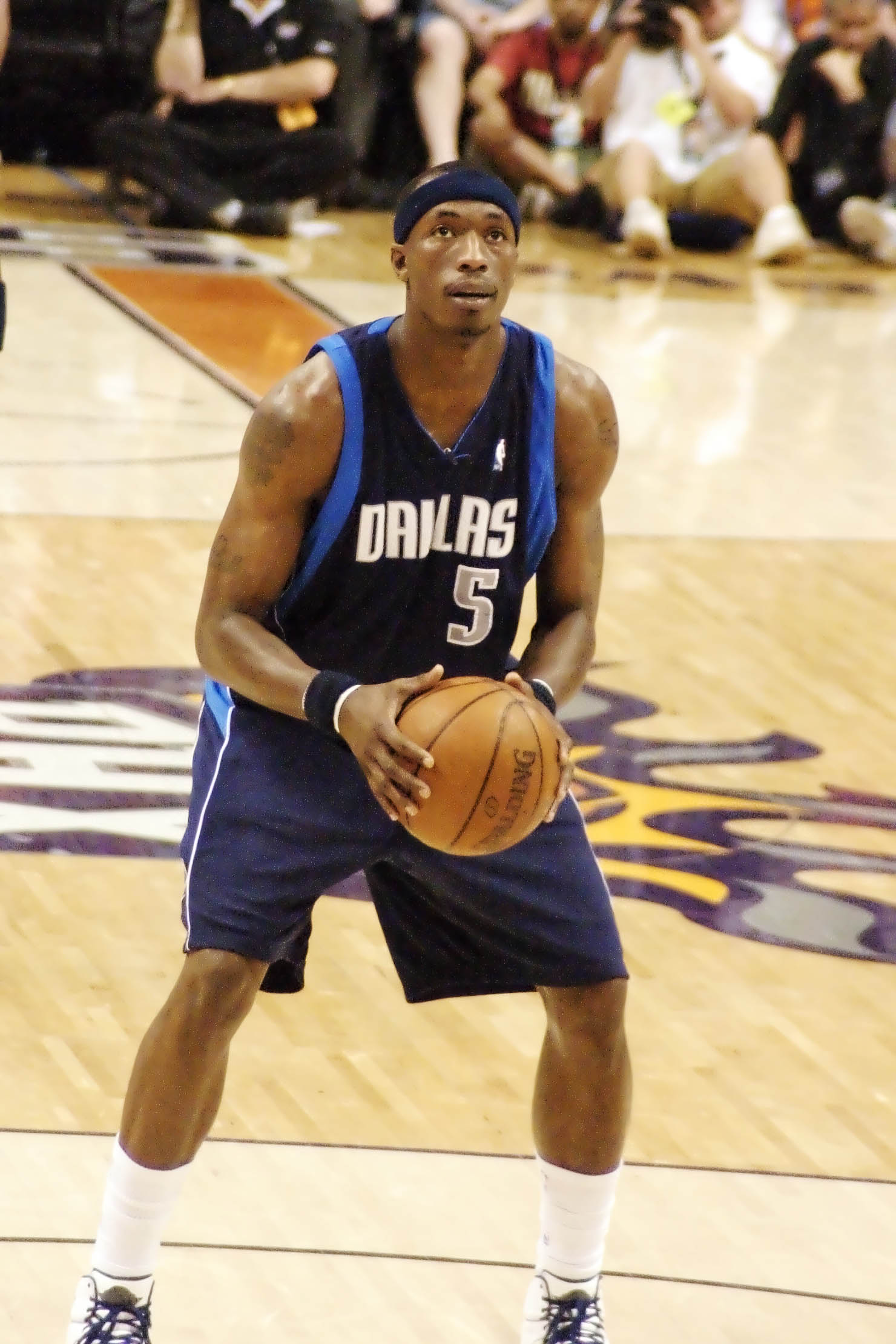
Howard preparing to shoot a free throw, 2008

Howard was selected in the 2003 NBA draft by the Dallas Mavericks in the first round (29th overall). He played in 67 games (29 starts) during his rookie year, averaging 8.6 points and 5.5 rebounds per game earning him NBA All-Rookie 2nd team honors.

In his second season, Howard continued coming off the bench and tasked to do "mop-up minutes" until a nagging injury to Marquis Daniels gave Howard a spot at small forward in the starting lineup. Howard averaged 12.6 points, 6.4 rebounds, and 1.53 steals in 32 minutes of play for the season.

In the 2005–06 season, Howard averaged a career-high in scoring (15.6 points) and three-point field goal percentage (.429), in addition to tallying 6.8 rebounds and 1.2 steals per game. He was limited to 59 games due to injury. In the 2006 NBA playoffs, Howard was vital to the Mavs' run to the Finals to the point where the team was 23–0 when Howard scored more than 20 points a game. In game 5 of the 2006 NBA Finals against the Miami Heat, it was asserted by referees that Howard called for a timeout during Dwyane Wade's free throw attempts, which only allowed Dallas to inbound the ball at full court instead of setting up for a play at half court. Howard asserted that in fact no timeout was called and that even referee Joey Crawford agreed with him. After Dwyane Wade hit his second foul shot to put the Miami Heat up by one point, Dallas was unable to advance the ball to halfcourt for an attempt at a game-winning shot.

Early in 2006, Team USA director Jerry Colangelo invited Howard to serve as one of Team USA's possible defensive specialists (the other two being Shane Battier of the Memphis Grizzlies and Bruce Bowen of the San Antonio Spurs) in the 2008 Summer Olympics. Howard turned down the offer, instead going back to run his annual youth camp in his hometown of Winston-Salem, North Carolina.

During the 2006–07 season, Howard missed 2 games (Seattle at Dallas, and Dallas at Memphis). His 18.9 points per game combined with 6.8 rebounds a game helped lead the Dallas Mavericks to a season-best 67–15 record; however, he was left out of All-Star weekend at first. After injuries to Yao Ming and Carlos Boozer, Howard was offered the extra spot. Hall of Famer Magic Johnson commented on Howard's omission at first, saying "I've got a problem with it, I really do". Johnson also went on to say "Josh Howard should be an All-Star. Period."

On December 8, 2007, Howard scored a career high 47 points against the Utah Jazz.

On April 25, 2008, hours before Game 3 of the Mavericks' first-round series with the New Orleans Hornets, Howard told Michael Irvin in an interview on ESPN Radio 103.3 FM that he smoked marijuana in the offseason, and that while he would not smoke during the season even if the NBA did not conduct random testing, he did not "think that's stopping me from doing my job." He called his marijuana use "my personal choice". He had previously discussed his marijuana use and its possible link to him slipping to the 29th pick in 2003 NBA draft with TrueHoop blogger Henry Abbot.

=== Washington Wizards (2010–2011) ===
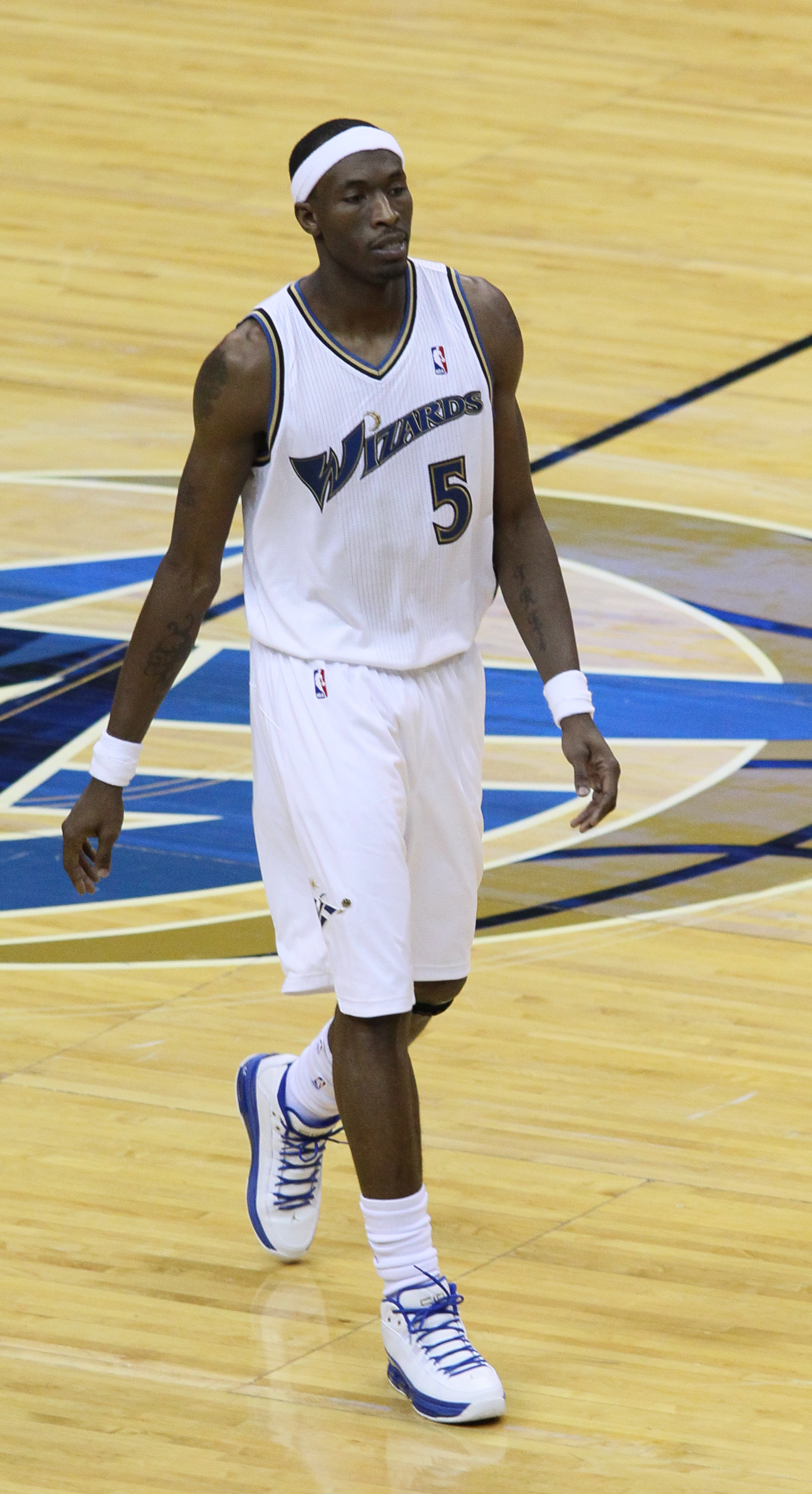
Howard with the Wizards in 2010

On February 13, 2010, Howard was traded to the Washington Wizards along with Drew Gooden, James Singleton and Quinton Ross for Caron Butler, Brendan Haywood, and DeShawn Stevenson.

On March 16, 2010, Howard underwent surgery after tearing his ACL against the Chicago Bulls on February 22. Howard was expected to miss 6 to 8 months.

=== Utah Jazz (2011–2012) ===
On December 15, 2011, Howard agreed to a one-year contract worth around $3 million with the Utah Jazz.

=== Minnesota Timberwolves (2012) ===
On November 15, 2012, Howard signed a one-year contract for the veteran's minimum with the Minnesota Timberwolves. He was waived on December 20, 2012, after suffering a torn ACL on December 14, 2012. That game where Howard suffered the ACL tear ended up being the final game of his NBA career. Howard recorded 3 points and 2 rebounds in the Timberwolves' 113 – 102 victory over the New Orleans Hornets.

=== Austin Toros (2013–2014) ===
On October 25, 2013, Howard signed with the San Antonio Spurs. However, he was waived just a day later. On October 31, Howard was acquired by the Austin Toros of the NBA Development League, the Spurs' D-League affiliate. On February 27, 2014, he was waived by the Toros due to a season-ending injury.

In July 2014, Howard joined the New Orleans Pelicans for the 2014 NBA Summer League.

== Coaching career ==
In July 2016, Howard was hired by Piedmont International University to be their new head coach. He led the team to a 49–49 record in four seasons. In April 2020, he was hired as the head coach of the University of North Texas at Dallas, which began play as an NAIA member in the 2020–21 season.

== Career statistics ==
Legend
GP	Games played	GS	Games started	MPG	Minutes per game
FG%	Field goal percentage	3P%	3-point field goal percentage	FT%	Free throw percentage
RPG	Rebounds per game	APG	Assists per game	SPG	Steals per game
BPG	Blocks per game	PPG	Points per game	**Bold**	Career high

=== College ===
Year	Team	GP	GS	MPG	FG%	3P%	FT%	RPG	APG	SPG	BPG	PPG
1999–2000	Wake Forest	**36**	**34**	24.9	.460	.286	.583	4.7	1.8	1.2	.9	9.2
2000–01	Wake Forest	29	28	27.2	.490	**.391**	.685	5.9	1.8	2.0	1.1	13.6
2001–02	Wake Forest	31	26	27.4	**.504**	.329	.657	7.7	**2.1**	1.6	1.0	13.9
2002–03	Wake Forest	31	31	**32.3**	.477	.373	**.833**	**8.3**	1.9	**2.1**	**1.5**	**19.5**
Career		127	119	27.8	.483	.353	.708	6.6	1.9	1.7	1.1	13.9

=== NBA ===
==== Regular season ====
Year	Team	GP	GS	MPG	FG%	3P%	FT%	RPG	APG	SPG	BPG	PPG
2003–04	Dallas	67	29	23.7	.430	.303	.703	5.5	1.4	1.0	**.8**	8.6
2004–05	Dallas	**76**	**76**	32.2	**.475**	.296	.733	6.4	1.4	**1.5**	.6	12.6
2005–06	Dallas	59	58	32.5	.471	**.429**	.734	6.3	1.9	1.2	.4	15.6
2006–07	Dallas	70	69	35.1	.459	.385	**.827**	6.8	1.8	1.2	**.8**	18.9
2007–08	Dallas	**76**	**76**	**36.3**	.455	.319	.813	**7.0**	**2.2**	.8	.4	**19.9**
2008–09	Dallas	52	51	32.0	.451	.345	.782	5.1	1.6	1.1	.6	18.0
2009–10	Dallas	31	9	26.7	.401	.267	.790	3.6	1.4	.7	.3	12.5
2009–10	Washington	4	3	22.8	.435	.273	.750	3.3	1.0	.8	.5	14.5
2010–11	Washington	18	10	22.7	.358	.241	.617	4.1	1.3	.7	.3	8.4
2011–12	Utah	43	18	23.0	.399	.243	.773	3.7	1.2	.7	.2	8.7
2012–13	Minnesota	11	4	18.8	.403	.313	.583	3.3	.4	.9	.3	6.7
Career		507	403	30.3	.448	.332	.770	5.7	1.6	1.0	.5	14.3
All-Star		1	0	20.0	.333	.000	.500	4.0	3.0	.0	.0	3.0

==== Playoffs ====
Year	Team	GP	GS	MPG	FG%	3P%	FT%	RPG	APG	SPG	BPG	PPG
2004	Dallas	5	0	17.2	.222	.200	**.909**	6.4	.8	1.2	**1.2**	5.4
2005	Dallas	13	13	32.9	.503	.250	.745	7.4	1.8	.8	.5	15.5
2006	Dallas	**23**	**23**	35.8	.453	.369	.808	7.4	1.4	1.0	.6	16.7
2007	Dallas	6	6	**41.3**	**.515**	.389	.704	**9.8**	**2.8**	**2.2**	.8	**21.3**
2008	Dallas	5	5	34.2	.292	.100	.800	7.0	1.4	.4	.4	12.6
2009	Dallas	10	10	29.5	.438	.250	.776	5.1	1.3	.9	.4	15.8
2012	Utah	4	3	15.8	.294	**.500**	.800	3.5	1.0	.5	.3	3.8
Career		66	60	32.0	.440	.311	.782	6.9	1.5	1.0	.6	14.8

== Awards and achievements ==
- ACC Player of the Year: 2003
- All ACC First Team: 2003
- ACC All-Defensive Team: 2003
- AP First Team All-America: 2003
- NBA All-Rookie Second Team: 2004
- NBA All-Star: 2007

== Personal life ==
Howard's son, Bryson, is now committed to Duke University as a 5 star recruit.
