= Dompierre-sur-Héry =

- Part of Beaulieu
- Location of Dompierre-sur-Héry
- Location within France Location within Bourgogne-Franche-Comté
- Coordinates: 47°15′56″N 3°33′54″E
- Country: France
- Region: Bourgogne-Franche-Comté
- Department: Nièvre
- Arrondissement: Clamecy
- Canton: Corbigny
- Commune: Beaulieu
- Area^{1}: 6.11 km^{2} (2.36 sq mi)
- Highest elevation: 321 m (1,053 ft)
- Lowest elevation: 216 m (709 ft)
- Population (2022): 72
  - Density: 12/km^{2} (31/sq mi)
- Time zone: UTC+01:00 (CET)
  - Summer (DST): UTC+02:00 (CEST)
- Postal code: 58420
- ^{1} French Land Register data, which excludes lakes, ponds, glaciers > 1 km^{2} (0.386 sq mi or 247 acres) and river estuaries.

Dompierre-sur-Héry (French pronunciation: [dɔ̃pjɛʁ syʁ eʁi]) is a former commune in the Nièvre department in central France. On 1 January 2016, it was merged into the commune Beaulieu. In 2022, the estimated population was 72.

== See also ==
- Communes of the Nièvre department
