= Quinton Ross =

American basketball player (born 1981)

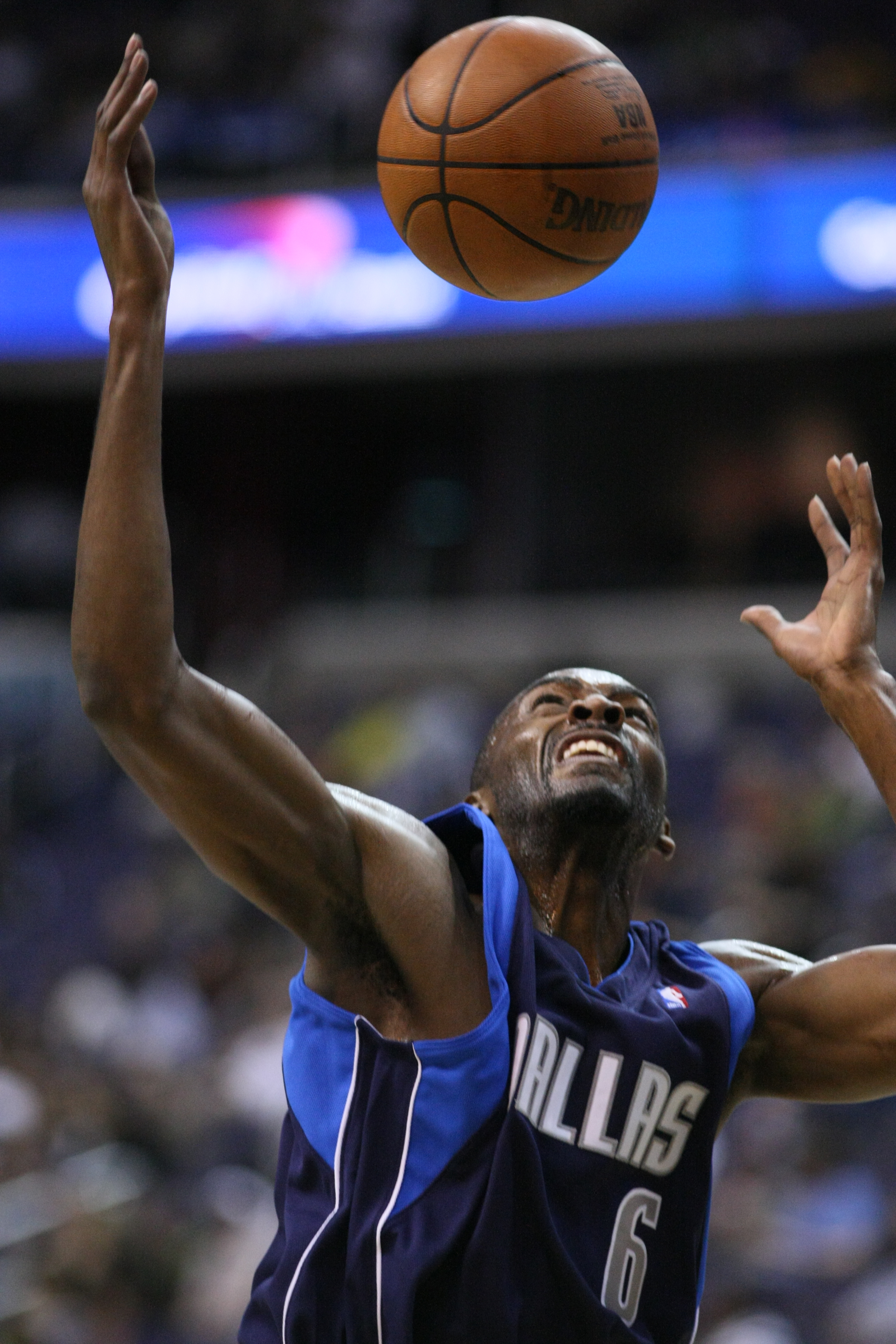
- Ross with the Dallas Mavericks in 2009

Personal information
- Born: April 30, 1981 (age 45) Dallas, Texas, U.S.
- Listed height: 6 ft 6 in (1.98 m)
- Listed weight: 195 lb (88 kg)

Career information
- High school: Justin F. Kimball (Dallas, Texas)
- College: SMU (1999–2003)
- NBA draft: 2003: undrafted
- Playing career: 2003–2013
- Position: Shooting guard / small forward
- Number: 13, 6, 3

Career history
- 2003–2004: Telindus Oostende
- 2004–2008: Los Angeles Clippers
- 2008–2009: Memphis Grizzlies
- 2009–2010: Dallas Mavericks
- 2010: Washington Wizards
- 2010–2011: New Jersey Nets
- 2012: Canton Charge
- 2012–2013: Boulazac

Career highlights
- WAC Player of the Year (2003); First-team All-WAC (2003)
- Stats at NBA.com
- Stats at Basketball Reference

Quinton Lenord Ross (born April 30, 1981) is an American former professional basketball player. Ross played college basketball for the SMU Mustangs. He played professionally in NBA for the Los Angeles Clippers, Memphis Grizzlies, Dallas Mavericks, Washington Wizards, and New Jersey Nets.

== High school and college ==
Ross led Dallas's Justin F. Kimball High School to the state finals, but they lost in the championship game.

He went undrafted in the 2003 NBA draft after graduating from Southern Methodist University, where he majored in economics. Ross averaged 14.8 points, 5.5 rebounds, and 1.9 assists in 119 games played over his four-year collegiate career. He finished his career at SMU as the school's fourth all-time leading scorer with 1,763 points, and was named all-Conference USA first team in 2003.

== Professional career ==
He was the final player waived by the Clippers before the start of the regular season. Following that 2003 preseason in which he averaged 5.4 points, 0.8 rebounds, and 0.8 assists in five games with the Clippers, Ross signed with Telindus Oostende of Belgium for one season (2003–04). During his time overseas, he averaged 16.7 points and 4.8 rebounds. Ross signed a four-year free agent contract with the Clippers on August 16, 2004.

On January 17, 2007, Ross scored 24 points in a win against the Golden State Warriors. His previous career high occurred on May 18, 2006, against the Phoenix Suns in game 6 of the Western Conference semifinals, when he scored 18 points.

On September 26, 2008, Ross signed a contract with the Memphis Grizzlies. His first cousin Darrell Arthur was his teammate on the Grizzlies. On July 8, 2009, Ross signed a contract with the Dallas Mavericks.

On February 13, 2010, Ross was traded to the Washington Wizards along with Josh Howard, Drew Gooden and James Singleton for Caron Butler, Brendan Haywood, and DeShawn Stevenson.

On June 29, 2010, Ross was traded to the New Jersey Nets for Yi Jianlian and cash. He was waived by the Nets on March 31, 2011.

During the 2012–13 season, he played for French club Boulazac.

== Awards and honors ==
- WAC Player of the Year honors: 2002–03
- First Team All-WAC honors: 2003
- Associated Press Honorable Mention All-America: 2003

== NBA career statistics ==
Legend
| GP | Games played | GS | Games started | MPG | Minutes per game |
| FG% | Field goal percentage | 3P% | 3-point field goal percentage | FT% | Free throw percentage |
| RPG | Rebounds per game | APG | Assists per game | SPG | Steals per game |
| BPG | Blocks per game | PPG | Points per game | **Bold** | Career high |

=== Regular season ===
| Year | Team | GP | GS | MPG | FG% | 3P% | FT% | RPG | APG | SPG | BPG | PPG |
|---|---|---|---|---|---|---|---|---|---|---|---|---|
| 2004–05 | L.A. Clippers | 78 | 19 | 21.3 | .432 | .250 | .673 | **2.7** | **1.4** | .7 | .3 | 5.1 |
| 2005–06 | L.A. Clippers | 67 | **45** | **22.6** | .422 | .000 | .760 | 2.5 | 1.2 | .8 | .2 | 4.7 |
| 2006–07 | L.A. Clippers | **81** | 43 | 21.0 | **.467** | .200 | .782 | 2.3 | 1.1 | **.9** | **.4** | **5.2** |
| 2007–08 | L.A. Clippers | 76 | 44 | 19.8 | .391 | **.429** | .667 | 2.3 | 1.2 | .6 | **.4** | 4.1 |
| 2008–09 | Memphis | 68 | 7 | 17.1 | .382 | .375 | **.810** | 1.9 | .7 | .5 | .2 | 3.9 |
| 2009–10 | Dallas | 27 | 7 | 11.1 | .411 | .231 | .625 | 1.0 | .3 | .3 | .1 | 2.0 |
| 2009–10 | Washington | 25 | 0 | 10.4 | .309 | .125 | .500 | .9 | .2 | .2 | .1 | 1.5 |
| 2010–11 | New Jersey | 36 | 4 | 9.8 | .441 | .000 | .357 | .8 | .3 | .1 | .2 | 1.6 |
| Career | | 458 | 169 | 18.5 | .419 | .318 | .711 | 2.1 | .9 | .6 | .3 | 4.1 |

=== Playoffs ===
| Year | Team | GP | GS | MPG | FG% | 3P% | FT% | RPG | APG | SPG | BPG | PPG |
|---|---|---|---|---|---|---|---|---|---|---|---|---|
| 2006 | L.A. Clippers | 12 | 10 | 24.5 | .534 | .000 | .875 | 2.7 | .8 | .6 | .7 | 7.7 |
| Career | | 12 | 10 | 24.5 | .534 | .000 | .875 | 2.7 | .8 | .6 | .7 | 7.7 |
