= Erick Dampier =

American basketball player (born 1975)

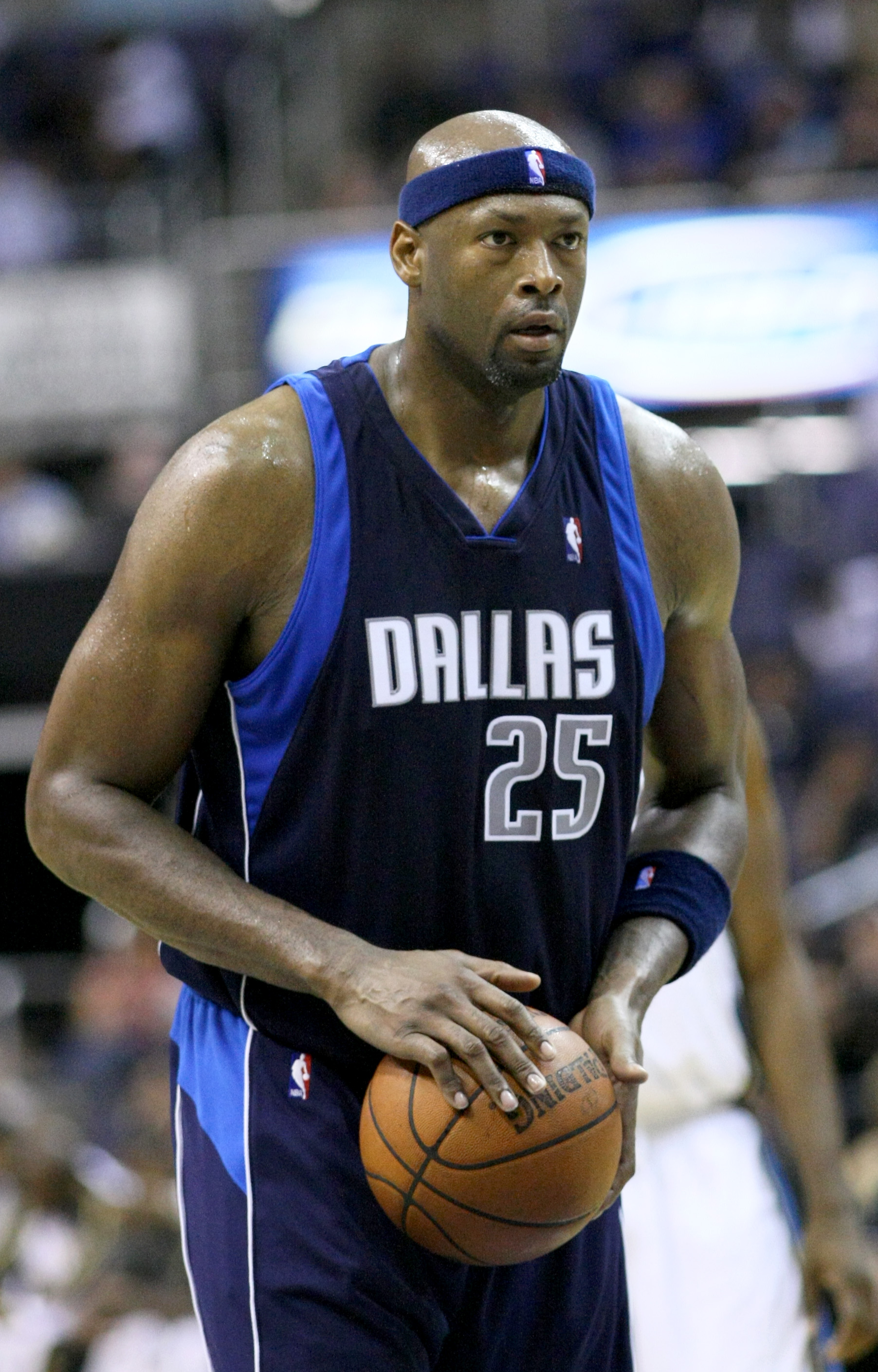
- Dampier with the Dallas Mavericks in 2009

Personal information
- Born: July 14, 1975 (age 51) Jackson, Mississippi, U.S.
- Listed height: 6 ft 11 in (2.11 m)
- Listed weight: 265 lb (120 kg)

Career information
- High school: Lawrence County (Monticello, Mississippi)
- College: Mississippi State (1993–1996)
- NBA draft: 1996: 1st round, 10th overall pick
- Drafted by: Indiana Pacers
- Playing career: 1996–2012
- Position: Center
- Number: 35, 25

Career history
- 1996–1997: Indiana Pacers
- 1997–2004: Golden State Warriors
- 2004–2010: Dallas Mavericks
- 2010–2011: Miami Heat
- 2012: Atlanta Hawks

Career highlights
- 2× First-team All-SEC (1995, 1996); Second-team All-SEC (1994); SEC All-Freshman Team (1994)

Career NBA statistics
- Points: 7,309 (7.4 ppg)
- Rebounds: 7,005 (7.1 rpg)
- Blocks: 1,398 (1.4 bpg)
- Stats at NBA.com
- Stats at Basketball Reference

Erick Travez Dampier (born July 14, 1975) is an American former professional basketball player. He played in the National Basketball Association (NBA) for the Indiana Pacers, Golden State Warriors, Dallas Mavericks, Miami Heat and Atlanta Hawks. He was a 6 ft 11 in / 265 lb. center.

== Early life and college ==
Dampier played competitively at Lawrence County High School in Monticello, Mississippi, where he led the rural county to two state championships. Dampier played college basketball at Mississippi State University. While there he became a member of Kappa Alpha Psi. He was an early entry to the 1996 NBA draft after his junior season, in which he led MSU to the 1996 Southeastern Conference tournament championship and the NCAA Final Four.

== Professional career ==
=== Indiana Pacers (1996–1997) ===
Dampier was drafted as the tenth pick in the first round of the 1996 NBA draft by the Indiana Pacers.

He played 72 games in his rookie year with the Pacers, starting 21 of them and finishing with averages of 5.1 points and 4.1 rebounds per game.

=== Golden State Warriors (1997–2004) ===
On August 12, 1997, Dampier and Duane Ferrell were traded to the Golden State Warriors for Chris Mullin.

He spent the next seven years, primarily as the starting center, with the Warriors. On November 22, 2002, Dampier scored a career-high 31 points and grabbed 14 rebounds, during a 95–91 loss to the Milwaukee Bucks. Arguably, he hit his peak production in 2003–04 with averages of 12.3 points, 12 rebounds and 1.85 blocks per game. However, some critics claimed that he stepped up his production because he was in a contract year, and indeed he was considered a top free-agent commodity in the 2004 off-season.

=== Dallas Mavericks (2004–2010) ===
On August 24, 2004, Dampier was signed and traded to the Dallas Mavericks along with Dan Dickau, Evan Eschmeyer and rights to Steve Logan in exchange for Christian Laettner, Eduardo Nájera, 2 future first-round picks, the draft rights to Luis Flores and Mladen Sekularac, and a trade exception. In his first season in Dallas he played in 59 games (starting 56), averaging 9.2 points, 8.5 rebounds and 1.85 blocks per game.

=== Miami Heat (2010–2011) ===
On July 13, 2010, Dampier was traded to the Charlotte Bobcats along with Matt Carroll and Eduardo Nájera in exchange for Tyson Chandler and Alexis Ajinça. He was waived on September 14, 2010.

On November 23, 2010, Dampier signed a contract with the Miami Heat.

=== Atlanta Hawks (2012) ===
Dampier signed a ten-day contract with the Atlanta Hawks on February 9, 2012. On February 19, 2012, he signed his second ten-day contract with the Hawks. On March 1, 2012, Dampier signed with the Hawks for the rest of the season.

== NBA career statistics ==
Legend
GP	Games played	GS	Games started	MPG	Minutes per game
FG%	Field goal percentage	3P%	3-point field goal percentage	FT%	Free throw percentage
RPG	Rebounds per game	APG	Assists per game	SPG	Steals per game
BPG	Blocks per game	PPG	Points per game	**Bold**	Career high
*	Led the league

=== Regular season ===
Year	Team	GP	GS	MPG	FG%	3P%	FT%	RPG	APG	SPG	BPG	PPG
1996–97	Indiana	72	21	14.6	.390	**1.000**	.637	4.1	.6	.3	1.0	5.1
1997–98	Golden State	**82***	**82***	32.4	.445	.000	.669	8.7	1.1	**.5**	1.7	11.8
1998–99	Golden State	50*	50*	28.3	.389	.000	.588	7.6	1.1	**.5**	1.2	8.8
1999–00	Golden State	21	12	23.6	.405	.000	.529	6.4	.9	.4	.7	8.0
2000–01	Golden State	43	26	24.1	.401	.000	.532	5.8	**1.4**	.4	1.3	7.4
2001–02	Golden State	73	46	23.8	.435	.000	.645	5.3	1.2	.2	**2.3**	7.6
2002–03	Golden State	**82**	**82***	24.1	.496	.000	**.698**	6.6	.7	.3	1.9	8.2
2003–04	Golden State	74	74	**32.5**	.535	.000	.654	**12.0**	.8	.4	1.9	**12.3**
2004–05	Dallas	59	56	27.3	.550	.000	.605	8.5	.9	.3	1.4	9.2
2005–06	Dallas	**82***	36	23.6	.493	.000	.591	7.8	.6	.3	1.3	5.7
2006–07	Dallas	76	73	25.2	.626	.000	.623	7.4	.6	.3	1.1	7.1
2007–08	Dallas	72	64	24.4	.643	.000	.575	7.5	.9	.3	1.5	6.1
2008–09	Dallas	80	80	23.0	**.650**	.000	.638	7.1	1.0	.3	1.2	5.7
2009–10	Dallas	55	47	23.3	.624	.333	.604	7.3	.6	.3	1.4	6.0
2010–11	Miami	51	22	16.0	.584	.000	.545	3.5	.4	.3	.9	2.5
2011–12	Atlanta	15	0	5.5	.125	.000	.000	1.7	.3	.1	.3	.1
Career		987	771	24.3	.498	.125	.626	7.1	.8	.3	1.4	7.4

=== Playoffs ===
Year	Team	GP	GS	MPG	FG%	3P%	FT%	RPG	APG	SPG	BPG	PPG
2005	Dallas	13	**13**	23.7	.597	.000	.393	**7.5**	.5	.5	**1.4**	**7.0**
2006	Dallas	**19**	2	23.9	.540	.000	.614	6.7	.3	**.6**	1.3	5.0
2007	Dallas	5	2	7.6	**.667**	.000	.500	3.4	.2	.0	.0	1.0
2008	Dallas	5	5	19.0	.412	.000	.400	4.2	.0	.2	.6	3.6
2009	Dallas	10	10	**25.5**	.611	.000	.619	6.1	**.7**	.4	.9	5.7
2010	Dallas	5	4	23.6	.000	.000	.417	6.6	.6	.2	1.0	1.0
2012	Atlanta	4	0	13.8	.538	.000	**.667**	3.5	.0	.0	.3	4.0
Career		61	36	21.7	.541	.000	.525	6.1	.4	.4	1.0	4.7

== Personal life ==
His son, Erick Dampier Jr., is one of the best high school basketball players in the United States. He is ranked as a five-star recruit in the class of 2028, and has represented the United States under-17 national team in 2025 and 2026.

== See also ==
- List of National Basketball Association career blocks leaders
