= 2006–07 Golden State Warriors season =

NBA professional basketball team season

- Head coach: Don Nelson
- General manager: Chris Mullin
- Owners: Chris Cohan
- Arena: Oracle Arena

Results
- Record: 42–40 (.512)
- Place: Division: 3rd (Pacific); Conference: 8th (Western)
- Playoff finish: Conference Semifinals (lost to Jazz 1–4)
- Stats at Basketball Reference

Local media
- Television: FOX Sports Bay Area
- Radio: KNBR

The 2006–07 Golden State Warriors season was the 61st National Basketball Association (NBA) season for the Golden State Warriors basketball franchise, and their 34th overall while based in Oakland, California. Following the 2005–06 season, in which the Warriors ranked last in their division, the team roster was greatly revamped following a blockbuster eight-player deal with the Indiana Pacers in January 2007. After an average start to the 2006–07 season, Golden State made a dramatic turn-around, ending the year on a 16–5 run, and capturing the eighth seed in the Western Conference, marking their return to the post-season after a thirteen-year hiatus, having last made the playoffs in 1994. The Warriors met the top-seeded Dallas Mavericks led by regular season MVP Dirk Nowitzki in the first round of the playoffs, and shocked many in the basketball world when they defeated the Mavericks and Nowitzki four games to two, for their first playoff series win since 1991, and becoming the third eighth-seeded team in NBA history to eliminate a first-seeded team in the playoffs, and the first to do so over a 7 game series, following the Denver Nuggets in 1994, and the New York Knicks in the strike shortened 1999 season. However, the Warriors met the Utah Jazz in the second round, and were defeated four games to one.

The Warriors would not make the playoffs again until 2013.

Borrowing from the success of the Sacramento Kings’ 2004–2005 postseason marketing campaign, during which the Sacramento Kings used the slogan “We Believe,” We Believe became the Warriors’ slogan for the last two months of the season and the playoffs.

== Draft ==
| Round | Pick | Player | Position | Nationality | School/ club team |
|---|---|---|---|---|---|
| 1 | 9 | Patrick O'Bryant | C | United States | Bradley |
| 2 | 38 | Kosta Perović | C | Serbia | (Serbia) Partizan Belgrade |

== Regular season ==
=== Standings ===
| Pacific Division | W | L | PCT | GB | Home | Road | Div |
|---|---|---|---|---|---|---|---|
| y-Phoenix Suns | 61 | 21 | .744 | - | 33–8 | 28–13 | 11–5 |
| x-Los Angeles Lakers | 42 | 40 | .512 | 19 | 25–16 | 17–24 | 10–6 |
| x-Golden State Warriors | 42 | 40 | .512 | 19 | 30–11 | 12–29 | 6–10 |
| Los Angeles Clippers | 40 | 42 | .488 | 21 | 25–16 | 15–26 | 8–8 |
| Sacramento Kings | 33 | 49 | .402 | 28 | 20–21 | 13–28 | 5–11 |

| # | Western Conference | | | | |
| # | Team | W | L | PCT | GB |
|---|---|---|---|---|---|
| 1 | z-Dallas Mavericks | 67 | 15 | .817 | - |
| 2 | y-Phoenix Suns | 61 | 21 | .744 | 6 |
| 3 | x-San Antonio Spurs | 58 | 24 | .707 | 9 |
| 4 | y-Utah Jazz | 51 | 31 | .622 | 16 |
| 5 | x-Houston Rockets | 52 | 30 | .634 | 15 |
| 6 | x-Denver Nuggets | 45 | 37 | .549 | 22 |
| 7 | x-Los Angeles Lakers | 42 | 40 | .512 | 25 |
| 8 | x-Golden State Warriors | 42 | 40 | .512 | 25 |
| 9 | Los Angeles Clippers | 40 | 42 | .488 | 27 |
| 10 | New Orleans/Oklahoma City Hornets | 39 | 43 | .476 | 28 |
| 11 | Sacramento Kings | 33 | 49 | .402 | 34 |
| 12 | Portland Trail Blazers | 32 | 50 | .390 | 35 |
| 13 | Minnesota Timberwolves | 32 | 50 | .390 | 35 |
| 14 | Seattle SuperSonics | 31 | 51 | .378 | 36 |
| 15 | Memphis Grizzlies | 22 | 60 | .268 | 45 |

== Season standings ==
=== Game log ===
==== November ====
Record: 9–7; home: 8–4; road: 1–3

| # | Date | Visitor | Score | Home | OT | Leading scorer | Attendance | Record |
| 1 | 2006-11-01 | Lakers | 110–98 | Warriors | NA | Monta Ellis (22) | 19,596 | 0–1 |
| 2 | 2006-11-03 | Blazers | 89–102 | Warriors | NA | Baron Davis (17) | 17,204 | 1–1 |
| 3 | 2006-11-04 | Warriors | 82–106 | Jazz | NA | Three-Way Tie (12) | 18,641 | 1–2 |
| 4 | 2006-11-06 | Warriors | 107–104 | Mavericks | NA | Baron Davis (26) | 20,093 | 2–2 |
| 5 | 2006-11-07 | Warriors | 93–97 | Hornets | NA | Baron Davis (22) | 19,164 | 2–3 |
| 6 | 2006-11-09 | Hornets | 116–121 | Warriors | NA | Baron Davis (36) | 16,927 | 3–3 |
| 7 | 2006-11-11 | Pistons | 79–111 | Warriors | NA | Baron Davis (20) | 18,508 | 4–3 |
| 8 | 2006-11-14 | Raptors | 99–110 | Warriors | NA | Two-Way Tie (22) | 16,182 | 5–3 |
| 9 | 2006-11-16 | Kings | 105–117 | Warriors | NA | Baron Davis (36) | 17,821 | 6–3 |
| 10 | 2006-11-18 | Sonics | 95–107 | Warriors | NA | Monta Ellis (31) | 17,205 | 7–3 |
| 11 | 2006-11-20 | Suns | 113–110 | Warriors | NA | Monta Ellis (31) | 18,078 | 7–4 |
| 12 | 2006-11-22 | Nuggets | 115–112 | Warriors | NA | Jason Richardson (24) | 17,505 | 7–5 |
| 13 | 2006-11-24 | Warriors | 129–140 | Nuggets | NA | Andris Biedriņš (31) | 16,234 | 7–6 |
| 14 | 2006-11-25 | Jazz | 78–91 | Warriors | NA | Matt Barnes (24) | 17,711 | 8–6 |
| 15 | 2006-11-27 | Spurs | 102–111 | Warriors | NA | Jason Richardson (26) | 17,078 | 9–6 |
| 16 | 2006-11-29 | Pacers | 108–106 | Warriors | NA | Monta Ellis (27) | 17,284 | 9–7 |

==== December ====
Record: 7–9; home: 5–1; road: 2–8

| # | Date | Visitor | Score | Home | OT | Leading scorer | Attendance | Record |
| 17 | 2006-12-02 | Bucks | 115–110 | Warriors | NA | Troy Murphy (23) | 18,086 | 9–8 |
| 18 | 2006-12-04 | Warriors | 89–129 | Spurs | NA | Anthony Roberson (21) | 18,797 | 9–9 |
| 19 | 2006-12-05 | Warriors | 90–118 | Rockets | NA | Monta Ellis (19) | NA | 9–10 |
| 20 | 2006-12-09 | Hornets | 80–101 | Warriors | NA | Mickaël Piétrus (22) | 17,105 | 10–10 |
| 21 | 2006-12-10 | Warriors | 115–117 | Sonics | NA | Baron Davis (28) | 16,138 | 10–11 |
| 22 | 2006-12-12 | Kings | 103–126 | Warriors | NA | Matt Barnes (32) | 17,574 | 11–11 |
| 23 | 2006-12-14 | Rockets | 107–109 | Warriors | NA | Baron Davis (34) | 19,596 | 12–11 |
| 24 | 2006-12-15 | Warriors | 101–105 | Suns | NA | Monta Ellis (24) | 18,422 | 12–12 |
| 25 | 2006-12-17 | Warriors | 115–120 | Raptors | NA | Monta Ellis (28) | 16,035 | 12–13 |
| 26 | 2006-12-18 | Warriors | 97–105 | Nets | NA | Baron Davis (25) | 14,096 | 12–14 |
| 27 | 2006-12-20 | Warriors | 96–95 | Celtics | NA | Baron Davis (31) | 17,134 | 13–14 |
| 28 | 2006-12-22 | Warriors | 117–108 | Magic | NA | Baron Davis (38) | 16,563 | 14–14 |
| 29 | 2006-12-23 | Warriors | 92–105 | Heat | NA | Matt Barnes (20) | 19,600 | 14–15 |
| 30 | 2006-12-26 | 76ers | 116–97 | Warriors | NA | Matt Barnes (25) | 19,183 | 15–15 |
| 31 | 2006-12-29 | Celtics | 100–110 | Warriors | NA | Baron Davis (27) | 19,596 | 16–15 |
| 32 | 2006-12-30 | Warriors | 96–119 | Kings | NA | Two-Way Tie (17) | 17,317 | 16–16 |

==== January ====
Record: 5–9; home: 4–3; road: 1–6

| # | Date | Visitor | Score | Home | OT | Leading scorer | Attendance | Record |
| 33 | 2007-01-02 | Warriors | 97–89 | Hornets | NA | Two-Way Tie (29) | 16,617 | 17–16 |
| 34 | 2007-01-03 | Warriors | 135–144 | Grizzlies | NA | Matt Barnes (36) | 12,176 | 17–17 |
| 35 | 2007-01-06 | Sonics | 104–108 | Warriors | NA | Baron Davis (22) | 17,007 | 18–17 |
| 36 | 2007-01-07 | Warriors | 105–128 | Suns | NA | Monta Ellis (22) | 18,422 | 18–18 |
| 37 | 2007-01-10 | Magic | 91–76 | Warriors | NA | Monta Ellis (14) | 16,877 | 18–19 |
| 38 | 2007-01-12 | Heat | 118–96 | Warriors | NA | Baron Davis (21) | 18,845 | 18–20 |
| 39 | 2007-01-15 | Clippers | 93–108 | Warriors | NA | Monta Ellis (24) | 18,371 | 19–20 |
| 40 | 2007-01-17 | Warriors | 109–115 | Clippers | NA | Two-Way Tie (28) | 17,385 | 19–21 |
| 41 | 2007-01-20 | Cavaliers | 106–104 | Warriors | 1 | Stephen Jackson (29) | 19,864 | 19–22 |
| 42 | 2007-01-22 | Warriors | 103–108 | Lakers | NA | Al Harrington (30) | 18,997 | 19–23 |
| 43 | 2007-01-24 | Nets | 109–110 | Warriors | NA | Al Harrington (29) | 17,284 | 20–23 |
| 44 | 2007-01-27 | Bobcats | 105–131 | Warriors | NA | Al Harrington (28) | 17,381 | 21–23 |
| 45 | 2007-01-30 | Warriors | 97–124 | Cavaliers | NA | Baron Davis (21) | 19,443 | 21–24 |
| 46 | 2007-01-31 | Warriors | 94–115 | Hawks | NA | Al Harrington (21) | 13,474 | 21–25 |

==== February ====
Record: 5–8; home: 3–1; road: 2–6

| # | Date | Visitor | Score | Home | OT | Leading scorer | Attendance | Record |
| 47 | 2007-02-02 | Warriors | 102–101 | 76ers | NA | Baron Davis (25) | 12,768 | 22–25 |
| 48 | 2007-02-03 | Warriors | 90–98 | Bobcats | NA | Baron Davis (21) | 15,171 | 22–26 |
| 49 | 2007-02-05 | Warriors | 113–98 | Pacers | NA | Stephen Jackson (36) | 12,736 | 23–26 |
| 50 | 2007-02-07 | Warriors | 93–121 | Timerwolves | NA | Šarūnas Jasikevičius (20) | 13,212 | 23–27 |
| 51 | 2007-02-09 | Bulls | 121–123 | Warriors | 1 | Al Harrington (24) | 18,168 | 24–27 |
| 52 | 2007-02-11 | Hawks | 106–105 | Warriors | NA | Monta Ellis (21) | 17,111 | 24–28 |
| 53 | 2007-02-12 | Warriors | 111–123 | Nuggets | NA | Al Harrington (24) | 15,513 | 24–29 |
| 54 | 2007-02-14 | Knicks | 101–120 | Warriors | NA | Stephen Jackson (36) | 17,023 | 25–29 |
| 55 | 2007-02-21 | Grizzlies | 115–118 | Warriors | 1 | Stephen Jackson (26) | 16,967 | 26–29 |
| 56 | 2007-02-24 | Warriors | 90–103 | Clippers | NA | Al Harrington (24) | 19,060 | 26–30 |
| 57 | 2007-02-25 | Lakers | 102–85 | Warriors | NA | Monta Ellis (22) | 20,107 | 26–31 |
| 58 | 2007-02-27 | Warriors | 101–122 | Bucks | NA | Monta Ellis (17) | 13,409 | 26–32 |
| 59 | 2007-02-28 | Warriors | 83–113 | Bulls | NA | Kelenna Azubuike (23) | 21,814 | 26–33 |

==== March ====
Record: 8–6; home: 6–1; road: 2–5

| # | Date | Visitor | Score | Home | OT | Leading scorer | Attendance | Record |
| 60 | 2007-03-02 | Warriors | 97–106 | Knicks | NA | Al Harrington (26) | 19,763 | 26–34 |
| 61 | 2007-03-04 | Warriors | 106–107 | Wizards | NA | Jason Richardson (28) | 20,173 | 26–35 |
| 62 | 2007-03-05 | Warriors | 111–93 | Pistons | NA | Jason Richardson (29) | 22,076 | 27–35 |
| 63 | 2007-03-07 | Nuggets | 96–110 | Warriors | NA | Baron Davis (22) | 19,596 | 28–35 |
| 64 | 2007-03-09 | Clippers | 89–99 | Warriors | NA | Baron Davis (25) | 18,177 | 29–35 |
| 65 | 2007-03-11 | Warriors | 87–106 | Blazers | NA | Al Harrington (16) | 14,875 | 29–36 |
| 66 | 2007-03-12 | Mavericks | 100–117 | Warriors | NA | Mickaël Piétrus (20) | 18,377 | 30–36 |
| 67 | 2007-03-16 | Timberwolves | 86–106 | Warriors | NA | Monta Ellis (24) | 18,527 | 31–36 |
| 68 | 2007-03-17 | Warriors | 99–98 | Sonics | NA | Jason Richardson (23) | 15,742 | 32–36 |
| 69 | 2007-03-20 | Warriors | 100–104 | Jazz | NA | Al Harrington (27) | 19,759 | 32–37 |
| 70 | 2007-03-23 | Wizards | 128–135 | Warriors | NA | Baron Davis (34) | 19,596 | 33–37 |
| 71 | 2007-03-25 | Warriors | 113–115 | Lakers | NA | Monta Ellis (31) | 18,997 | 33–38 |
| 72 | 2007-03-26 | Spurs | 126–89 | Warriors | NA | Two-Way Tie (17) | 18,207 | 33–39 |
| 73 | 2007-03-29 | Suns | 119–124 | Warriors | NA | Jason Richardson (36) | 19,596 | 34–39 |

==== April ====
Record: 8–1; home: 4–0; road: 4–1

| # | Date | Visitor | Score | Home | OT | Leading scorer | Attendance | Record |
| 74 | 2007-04-01 | Grizzlies | 117–122 | Warriors | NA | Jason Richardson (26) | 17,198 | 35–39 |
| 75 | 2007-04-04 | Warriors | 110–99 | Rockets | NA | Jason Richardson (26) | 13,929 | 36–39 |
| 76 | 2007-04-06 | Warriors | 116–104 | Grizzlies | NA | Baron Davis (31) | 14,087 | 37–39 |
| 77 | 2007-04-07 | Warriors | 99–112 | Spurs | NA | Jason Richardson (23) | 18,797 | 37–40 |
| 78 | 2007-04-09 | Jazz | 102–126 | Warriors | NA | Stephen Jackson (28) | 17,453 | 38–40 |
| 79 | 2007-04-13 | Warriors | 125–108 | Kings | NA | Stephen Jackson (26) | 17,317 | 39–40 |
| 80 | 2007-04-15 | Timberwolves | 108–121 | Warriors | NA | Jason Richardson (32) | 18,223 | 40–40 |
| 81 | 2007-04-17 | Mavericks | 82–111 | Warriors | NA | Mickaël Piétrus (22) | 20,073 | 41–40 |
| 82 | 2007-04-18 | Warriors | 120–98 | Blazers | NA | Stephen Jackson (31) | 19,455 | 42–40 |

- Green background indicates win.
- Red background indicates regulation loss.

== Playoffs ==
2007 playoff game log
First Round: 4–2 (home: 3–0; road: 1–2)

| Game | Date | Team | Score | High points | High rebounds | High assists | Location Attendance | Series |
|---|---|---|---|---|---|---|---|---|
| 1 | April 22 | @ Dallas | W 97–85 | Baron Davis (33) | Baron Davis (14) | Baron Davis (8) | American Airlines Center; 20,732 | 1–0 |
| 2 | April 25 | @ Dallas | L 99–112 | Stephen Jackson (30) | Jason Richardson (10) | Jason Richardson (3) | American Airlines Center; 20,867 | 1–1 |
| 3 | April 27 | Dallas | W 109–91 | Jason Richardson (30) | Andris Biedriņš (10) | Stephen Jackson (6) | Oracle Arena; 20,629 | 2–1 |
| 4 | April 29 | Dallas | W 103–99 | Baron Davis (33) | Baron Davis (8) | Baron Davis (4) | Oracle Arena; 20,672 | 3–1 |
| 5 | May 1 | @ Dallas | L 112–118 | Baron Davis (27) | Mickaël Piétrus (10) | Baron Davis (9) | American Airlines Center; 21,041 | 3–2 |
| 6 | May 3 | Dallas | W 111–86 | Stephen Jackson (33) | Andris Biedriņš (12) | Matt Barnes (7) | Oracle Arena; 20,677 | 4–2 |

Conference Semifinals: 1–4 (home: 1–1; road: 0–3)

| Game | Date | Team | Score | High points | High rebounds | High assists | Location Attendance | Series |
|---|---|---|---|---|---|---|---|---|
| 1 | May 7 | @ Utah | L 112–116 | Baron Davis (24) | Barnes, Richardson (10) | Baron Davis (7) | EnergySolutions Arena; 19,911 | 0–1 |
| 2 | May 9 | @ Utah | L 117–127 (OT) | Baron Davis (36) | Matt Barnes (7) | Baron Davis (7) | EnergySolutions Arena; 19,911 | 0–2 |
| 3 | May 11 | Utah | W 125–105 | Baron Davis (32) | Andris Biedriņš (13) | Baron Davis (9) | Oracle Arena; 20,655 | 1–2 |
| 4 | May 13 | Utah | L 101–115 | Jackson, Harrington (24) | Andris Biedriņš (10) | Baron Davis (7) | Oracle Arena; 20,679 | 1–3 |
| 5 | May 15 | @ Utah | L 87–100 | Baron Davis (21) | Jason Richardson (8) | Baron Davis (8) | EnergySolutions Arena; 19,911 | 1–4 |

2007 schedule

== Player stats ==
Legend
| GP | Games played | GS | Games started | MPG | Minutes per game |
| FG% | Field-goal percentage | 3P% | 3-point field-goal percentage | FT% | Free-throw percentage |
| RPG | Rebounds per game | APG | Assists per game | SPG | Steals per game |
| BPG | Blocks per game | PPG | Points per game |

=== Regular season ===
| Player | G | GS | MPG | FG% | 3P% | FT% | OFF | DEF | RPG | APG | SPG | BPG | TO | PF | PPG |
|---|---|---|---|---|---|---|---|---|---|---|---|---|---|---|---|
| Baron Davis | 63 | 62 | 35.3 | .439 | .304 | .745 | .80 | 3.60 | 4.40 | 8.1 | 2.14 | .46 | 3.06 | 2.90 | 20.1 |
| Al Harrington | 42 | 42 | 32.3 | .456 | .417 | .681 | 1.90 | 4.50 | 6.40 | 2.3 | .95 | .33 | 1.86 | 3.60 | 17.0 |
| Stephen Jackson | 38 | 37 | 34.0 | .446 | .341 | .804 | 1.20 | 2.20 | 3.30 | 4.6 | 1.34 | .37 | 2.68 | 3.00 | 16.8 |
| Monta Ellis | 77 | 53 | 34.3 | .475 | .273 | .763 | .80 | 2.40 | 3.20 | 4.1 | 1.71 | .27 | 2.87 | 2.70 | 16.5 |
| Jason Richardson | 51 | 49 | 32.8 | .417 | .365 | .657 | 1.40 | 3.70 | 5.10 | 3.4 | 1.06 | .63 | 1.61 | 2.50 | 16.0 |
| Mickaël Piétrus | 72 | 38 | 26.9 | .488 | .388 | .648 | 1.10 | 3.40 | 4.50 | .9 | .67 | .76 | 1.46 | 3.10 | 11.1 |
| Matt Barnes | 76 | 23 | 23.9 | .438 | .366 | .732 | 1.20 | 3.40 | 4.60 | 2.1 | .96 | .54 | 1.38 | 2.50 | 9.8 |
| Andris Biedrins | 82 | 63 | 29.0 | .599 | .000 | .521 | 3.10 | 6.20 | 9.30 | 1.1 | .82 | 1.66 | 1.45 | 3.70 | 9.5 |
| Kelenna Azubuike | 41 | 9 | 16.3 | .445 | .430 | .782 | .60 | 1.70 | 2.30 | .7 | .54 | .24 | .95 | 1.20 | 7.1 |
| Mike Dunleavy Jr. | 39 | 6 | 26.9 | .449 | .346 | .772 | 1.1 | 4.8 | 5.9 | 2.8 | 1.0 | .3 | 1.8 | 2.5 | 11.4 |
| Anthony Roberson | 20 | 1 | 11.4 | .423 | .382 | .667 | .10 | 1.00 | 1.10 | .5 | .60 | .00 | .65 | 1.40 | 5.6 |
| Renaldo Major | 1 | 0 | 27.0 | .200 | .000 | .500 | .00 | 2.00 | 2.00 | .0 | 2.00 | .00 | 1.00 | 4.00 | 5.0 |
| Šarūnas Jasikevičius | 26 | 2 | 11.9 | .366 | .273 | .871 | .20 | .60 | .80 | 2.3 | .50 | .04 | 1.19 | .80 | 4.3 |
| Dajuan Wagner | 1 | 0 | 7.0 | 1.000 | 1.000 | .500 | .00 | .00 | .00 | 1.0 | .00 | .00 | 1.00 | 1.00 | 4.0 |
| Josh Powell | 30 | 0 | 9.6 | .526 | .000 | .733 | .60 | 1.70 | 2.30 | .6 | .17 | .40 | .80 | 1.40 | 3.5 |
| Adonal Foyle | 48 | 6 | 9.9 | .565 | .000 | .440 | 1.10 | 1.60 | 2.60 | .4 | .23 | 1.04 | .48 | 1.30 | 2.2 |
| Patrick O'Bryant | 16 | 0 | 7.4 | .313 | .000 | .647 | .40 | .90 | 1.30 | .6 | .38 | .50 | .50 | 1.60 | 1.9 |

=== Playoffs ===
| Player | GP | GS | MPG | FG% | 3P% | FT% | RPG | APG | SPG | BPG | PPG |
|---|---|---|---|---|---|---|---|---|---|---|---|
| Kelenna Azubuike | 6 | 0 | 2.5 | .333 | .000 | 1.000 | .7 | .0 | .2 | .0 | .7 |
| Matt Barnes | 11 | 3 | 30.0 | .450 | .422 | .722 | 5.7 | 2.4 | 1.5 | .4 | 11.1 |
| Andris Biedrins | 11 | 8 | 24.3 | .730 | . | .533 | 6.3 | .5 | .7 | 1.5 | 6.4 |
| Baron Davis | 11 | 11 | 40.5 | .513 | .373 | .770 | 4.5 | 6.5 | 2.9 | .6 | 25.3 |
| Monta Ellis | 11 | 6 | 21.6 | .390 | .111 | .821 | 2.3 | .9 | .9 | .2 | 8.0 |
| Adonal Foyle | 3 | 0 | 2.0 | 1.000 | . | . | .7 | .0 | .0 | .0 | .7 |
| Al Harrington | 11 | 5 | 23.8 | .398 | .395 | .633 | 4.6 | .5 | .5 | .6 | 10.2 |
| Stephen Jackson | 11 | 11 | 41.3 | .379 | .361 | .816 | 3.6 | 3.6 | 2.0 | .7 | 19.9 |
| Sarunas Jasikevicius | 4 | 0 | 1.5 | .000 | . | .500 | .0 | .5 | .0 | .0 | .3 |
| Mickael Pietrus | 11 | 0 | 19.0 | .347 | .259 | .694 | 3.8 | .5 | .5 | .8 | 6.0 |
| Josh Powell | 4 | 0 | 1.5 | . | . | .500 | .3 | .0 | .0 | .3 | .3 |
| Jason Richardson | 11 | 11 | 38.9 | .476 | .354 | .704 | 6.7 | 2.0 | 1.3 | .5 | 19.1 |

== Roster ==
Golden State Warriors roster
Players

| Pos. | No. | Player | Height | Weight | DOB | From |
|---|---|---|---|---|---|---|
| G/F | 7 | Kelenna Azubuike | 6 ft 5 in (1.96 m) | 220 lb (100 kg) | 1983-12-16 | Kentucky |
| F | 22 | Matt Barnes | 6 ft 7 in (2.01 m) | 225 lb (102 kg) | 1980-03-09 | UCLA |
| C | 15 | Andris Biedriņš | 6 ft 11 in (2.11 m) | 245 lb (111 kg) | 1986-04-02 | Latvia |
| G | 5 | Baron Davis | 6 ft 3 in (1.91 m) | 215 lb (98 kg) | 1979-04-13 | UCLA |
| F | 34 | Mike Dunleavy Jr. | 6 ft 9 in (2.06 m) | 230 lb (104 kg) | 1980-09-15 | Duke |
| G | 8 | Monta Ellis | 6 ft 3 in (1.91 m) | 177 lb (80 kg) | 1985-10-26 | LHS (MS) |
| C | 31 | Adonal Foyle | 6 ft 10 in (2.08 m) | 270 lb (122 kg) | 1975-03-09 | Colgate |
| F/C | 3 | Al Harrington | 6 ft 9 in (2.06 m) | 245 lb (111 kg) | 1980-02-17 | SPHS (NJ) |
| F | 1 | Stephen Jackson | 6 ft 8 in (2.03 m) | 218 lb (99 kg) | 1978-04-05 | Oak Hill (VA) |
| C | 26 | Patrick O'Bryant (DL) | 7 ft 0 in (2.13 m) | 250 lb (113 kg) | 1986-06-20 | Bradley |
| G/F | 2 | Mickaël Piétrus | 6 ft 6 in (1.98 m) | 215 lb (98 kg) | 1982-02-07 | France |
| F | 11 | Žarko Čabarkapa | 6 ft 11 in (2.11 m) | 230 lb (104 kg) | 1981-05-21 | Serbia & Montenegro |
| G | 33 | Šarūnas Jasikevičius | 6 ft 4 in (1.93 m) | 197 lb (89 kg) | 1976-03-05 | Maryland |
| F | 21 | Josh Powell | 6 ft 9 in (2.06 m) | 225 lb (102 kg) | 1983-01-25 | NC State |
| G/F | 23 | Jason Richardson | 6 ft 6 in (1.98 m) | 225 lb (102 kg) | 1981-01-20 | Michigan State |
| PG | 3 | Anthony Roberson | 6 ft 2 in (1.88 m) | 180 lb (82 kg) | 1983-02-14 | Florida |

Coaches
Head coach
- Don Nelson
Assistant(s)
- Larry Riley
- Travis Schlenk
- Stephen Silas
- Keith Smart
- Russell Turner

Legend
- (DP) Unsigned draft pick
- (FA) Free agent
- (S) Suspended
- (DL) On assignment to D-League affiliate
- (L) On leave from the team
- Injured

Roster
Updated: March 30, 2007

== Transactions ==
=== Trades ===
| July 12, 2006 | To Golden State Warriors Devin Brown; Keith McLeod; Andre Owens | To Utah Jazz Derek Fisher |
| January 17, 2007 | To Golden State Warriors Al Harrington; Stephen Jackson; Šarūnas Jasikevičius; Josh Powell | To Indiana Pacers Ike Diogu; Mike Dunleavy Jr. Troy Murphy; Keith McLeod |

=== Free agency ===
==== Additions ====
| Player | Signed | Former team |
|---|---|---|
| Dajuan Wagner | | Cleveland Cavaliers |

==== Subtractions ====
| Player | Reason left | New team |
|---|---|---|
| Chris Taft | Waived | Grand Rapids Drive |
| Dajuan Wagner | Waived | Prokom Trefl Sopot |
| Anthony Roberson | Waived | Hapoel Jerusalem |

== Awards ==
| Recipient | Award | Date awarded |
|---|---|---|
| Monta Ellis | Most Improved Player | April 26, 2007 |
