= 2006–07 San Antonio Spurs season =

- NBA champions
- Conference champions
- Head coach: Gregg Popovich
- General manager: R.C. Buford
- Owners: Peter Holt
- Arena: AT&T Center

Results
- Record: 58–24 (.707)
- Place: Division: 2nd (Southwest); Conference: 3rd (Western)
- Playoff finish: NBA champions (Defeated Cavaliers 4–0)
- Stats at Basketball Reference

Local media
- Television: FSN Southwest, KENS, KMYS
- Radio: WOAI

The 2006–07 San Antonio Spurs season was the Spurs' 40th season as a franchise, the 34th in San Antonio, and the 31st season in the NBA. The Spurs had the second best team defensive rating and the fifth best offensive rating in the NBA.

In the playoffs, the Spurs defeated the Denver Nuggets in five games in the first round, then defeated the Phoenix Suns in six games in the Semifinals, and defeated the Utah Jazz in five games in the Conference Finals to advance to the NBA Finals for the fourth time in franchise history.

There, the Spurs faced off against the Cleveland Cavaliers, led by a young LeBron James, who were making their first ever NBA Finals appearance. The Spurs swept the Cavaliers in four games, winning their fourth NBA championship, with Tony Parker named Finals MVP, making him the first European-born player to win the award.

== Draft picks ==
Round	Pick	Player	Position	Nationality	College
2	59	Damir Markota	F	Croatia	

== Roster ==
2006–07 San Antonio Spurs roster
Players

Pos.	No.	Player	Height	Weight	DOB	From
G	17	Brent Barry	6 ft 6 in (1.98 m)	185 lb (84 kg)	December 31, 1971	Oregon State
F/C	15	Matt Bonner	6 ft 10 in (2.08 m)	235 lb (107 kg)	April 5, 1980	Florida
F	12	Bruce Bowen	6 ft 7 in (2.01 m)	185 lb (84 kg)	June 14, 1971	Cal State Fullerton
C	45	Jackie Butler	6 ft 10 in (2.08 m)	250 lb (113 kg)	March 10, 1985	Coastal Christian Academy (VA)
F/C	21	Tim Duncan	6 ft 11 in (2.11 m)	248 lb (112 kg)	April 25, 1976	Wake Forest
C	16	Francisco Elson	7 ft 0 in (2.13 m)	235 lb (107 kg)	February 28, 1976	California
C	2	Melvin Ely	6 ft 10 in (2.08 m)	260 lb (118 kg)	May 2, 1978	Fresno State
G	4	Michael Finley	6 ft 7 in (2.01 m)	215 lb (98 kg)	March 6, 1973	Wisconsin
G	20	Manu Ginobili	6 ft 6 in (1.98 m)	210 lb (95 kg)	July 28, 1977	Argentina
F	5	Robert Horry	6 ft 9 in (2.06 m)	180 lb (82 kg)	August 25, 1970	Alabama
C	7	Fabricio Oberto	6 ft 10 in (2.08 m)	245 lb (111 kg)	March 21, 1975	Argentina
G	9	Tony Parker	6 ft 2 in (1.88 m)	180 lb (82 kg)	May 17, 1982	France
G	14	Beno Udrih	6 ft 3 in (1.91 m)	205 lb (93 kg)	July 5, 1982	Slovenia
G	11	Jacque Vaughn	6 ft 1 in (1.85 m)	190 lb (86 kg)	February 11, 1975	Kansas
G/F	33	James White	6 ft 7 in (2.01 m)	200 lb (91 kg)	October 21, 1982	Cincinnati

Coaches
Head coach
- Gregg Popovich (Air Force)
Assistant(s)
- Brett Brown (Boston University)
- Mike Budenholzer (Pomona)
- P. J. Carlesimo (Fordham)
- Chip Engelland (Duke)
- Don Newman (Idaho)

Legend
- (DP) Unsigned draft pick
- (FA) Free agent
- (S) Suspended
- Injured

Roster

== Regular season ==
=== Standings ===
Southwest Division	W	L	PCT	GB	Home	Road	Div
z-Dallas Mavericks	67	15	.817	-	36–5	31–10	14–2
x-San Antonio Spurs	58	24	.707	9	31–10	27–14	10–6
x-Houston Rockets	52	30	.634	15	28–13	24–17	8–8
New Orleans/Oklahoma City Hornets	39	43	.476	28	24–17	15–26	6–10
Memphis Grizzlies	22	60	.268	45	14–27	8–33	2–14

#	Western Conference				
#	Team	W	L	PCT	GB
1	z-Dallas Mavericks	67	15	.817	-
2	y-Phoenix Suns	61	21	.744	6
3	x-San Antonio Spurs	58	24	.707	9
4	y-Utah Jazz	51	31	.622	16
5	x-Houston Rockets	52	30	.634	15
6	x-Denver Nuggets	45	37	.549	22
7	x-Los Angeles Lakers	42	40	.512	25
8	x-Golden State Warriors	42	40	.512	25
9	Los Angeles Clippers	40	42	.488	27
10	New Orleans/Oklahoma City Hornets	39	43	.476	28
11	Sacramento Kings	33	49	.402	34
12	Portland Trail Blazers	32	50	.390	35
13	Minnesota Timberwolves	32	50	.390	35
14	Seattle SuperSonics	31	51	.378	36
15	Memphis Grizzlies	22	60	.268	45

=== Game log ===
2006–07 game log
Total: 58–24 (Home: 31–10; Road: 27–14)
November: 11–5 (home: 4–3; road: 7–2)

Game	Date	Team	Score	High points	High rebounds	High assists	Location Attendance	Record
1	November 2	@ Dallas	W 97–91	Tony Parker (19)	Tim Duncan (10)	Manu Ginóbili (7)	American Airlines Center; 20,416	1–0
2	November 3	Cleveland	L 81–88	Tim Duncan (25)	Tim Duncan (12)	Tony Parker, Tim Duncan(5)	AT&T Center; 18,797	1–1
3	November 5	@ Toronto	W 103–94	Tim Duncan (26)	Fabricio Oberto (9)	Tim Duncan (4)	Air Canada Centre; 18,098	2–1
4	November 6	@ New York	W 105–93	Tony Parker (24)	Tim Duncan (8)	Tony Parker (10)	Madison Square Garden; 18,333	3–1
5	November 8	Phoenix	W 111–106 (OT)	Tony Parker (29)	Tim Duncan (14)	Tim Duncan, Tony Parker (6)	AT&T Center; 18,797	4–1
6	November 11	New York	W 100–92	Tony Parker (33)	Tim Duncan (16)	Tony Parker (6)	AT&T Center; 18,797	5–1
7	November 14	@ Houston	W 92–84	Tim Duncan, Manu Ginobili (19)	Tim Duncan (15)	Tony Parker (5)	Toyota Center; 18,289	6–1
8	November 15	Charlotte	L 92–95 (OT)	Tony Parker (25)	Tim Duncan (13)	Manu Ginóbili (7)	AT&T Center; 18,797	6–2
9	November 17	Chicago	W 100–83	Tim Duncan (21)	Tim Duncan (11)	Beno Udrih (9)	AT&T Center; 18,797	7–2
10	November 19	@ Sacramento	W 108–99	Tim Duncan (35)	Tim Duncan (14)	Tony Parker (4)	ARCO Arena; 17,317	8–2
11	November 20	@ Portland	W 107–98	Tim Duncan, Manu Ginóbili (25)	Tim Duncan (6)	Tim Duncan (5)	Rose Garden Arena; 14,163	9–2
12	November 22	Miami	W 106–86	Tim Duncan (19)	Tim Duncan, Brent Barry (6)	Tony Parker (4)	AT&T Center; 18,797	10–2
13	November 24	Dallas	L 92–95	Tim Duncan (29)	Fabricio Oberto (11)	Bruce Bowen, Tim Duncan (3)	AT&T Center; 18,797	10–3
14	November 26	@ Seattle	W 98–78	Tony Parker (20)	Tim Duncan (16)	Tim Duncan (6)	KeyArena; 15,483	11–3
15	November 27	@ Golden State	L 102–111	Tony Parker (28)	Tim Duncan (16)	Tony Parker (7)	Oracle Arena; 17,078	11–4
16	November 29	@ Utah	L 75–83	Tim Duncan (21)	Tim Duncan (10)	Brent Barry, Tony Parker (5)	EnergySolutions Arena; 19,089	11–5

December: 12–3 (home: 8–2; road: 4–1)

Game	Date	Team	Score	High points	High rebounds	High assists	Location Attendance	Record
17	December 2	Sacramento	W 100–98	Bruce Bowen (23)	Tim Duncan (11)	Tony Parker (8)	AT&T Center; 18,797	12–5
18	December 4	Golden State	W 129–89	Brent Barry (18)	Francisco Elson (9)	Manu Ginóbili (9)	AT&T Center; 18,797	13–5
19	December 6	@ Charlotte	W 96–76	Tim Duncan (25)	Michael Finley, Francisco Elson (6)	Manu Ginóbili, Tony Parker (5)	Charlotte Bobcats Arena; 14,066	14–5
20	December 8	L. A. Clippers	W 111–82	Manu Ginóbili (22)	Tim Duncan (10)	Tony Parker (15)	AT&T Center; 18,797	15–5
21	December 10	@ L. A. Lakers	L 99–106	Manu Ginóbili (23)	Tim Duncan (13)	Tony Parker (9)	STAPLES Center; 18,997	15–6
22	December 11	@ L. A. Clippers	W 103–81	Brent Barry (24)	Tim Duncan, Beno Udrih (5)	Beno Udrih (7)	STAPLES Center; 18,147	16–6
23	December 13	Minnesota	W 95–82	Tim Duncan (24)	Francisco Elson (7)	Tony Parker (6)	AT&T Center; 18,362	17–6
24	December 14	@ New Orleans/Oklahoma City	W 103–77	Manu Ginóbili (24)	Tim Duncan (9)	Tony Parker (8)	New Orleans Arena; 15,140	18–6
25	December 16	Philadelphia	W 103–98	Tony Parker (24)	Tim Duncan, Manu Ginóbili (9)	Tony Parker (8)	AT&T Center; 18,797	19–6
26	December 20	Memphis	W 105–98	Tim Duncan (21)	Tim Duncan (9)	Tony Parker (10)	AT&T Center; 18,797	20–6
27	December 22	Houston	L 78–97	Manu Ginóbili (23)	Tim Duncan (11)	Brent Barry, Tim Duncan (4)	AT&T Center; 18,797	20–7
28	December 23	New Orleans/Oklahoma City	W 112–77	Tony Parker (19)	Tony Parker (5)	Jacque Vaughn (11)	Ford Center; 19,164	21–7
29	December 26	Milwaukee	L 107–114	Tim Duncan (25)	Tim Duncan (12)	Tony Parker (10)	AT&T Center; 18,797	21–8
30	December 28	Utah	W 106–83	Tony Parker (22)	Tim Duncan (9)	Manu Ginóbili, Jacque Vaughn, Tony Parker (3)	AT&T Center; 18,797	22–8
31	December 31	Atlanta	W 95–81	Tony Parker (27)	Matt Bonner, Tim Duncan (11)	Tony Parker (5)	AT&T Center; 18,797	23–8

January: 9–7 (home: 4–3; road: 5–4)

Game	Date	Team	Score	High points	High rebounds	High assists	Location Attendance	Record
32	January 2	@ Cleveland	L 78–82	Tony Parker (26)	Tim Duncan (15)	Manu Ginóbili, Tony Parker, Brent Barry (3)	Quicken Loans Arena; 20,214	23–9
33	January 3	@ Minnesota	L 101–103 (OT)	Manu Ginóbili (26)	Tim Duncan (13)	Tim Duncan (5)	Target Center; 14,185	23–10
34	January 5	Dallas	L 85–90	Manu Ginóbili (25)	Tim Duncan (7)	Tim Duncan, Tony Parker (4)	AT&T Center; 18,797	23–11
35	January 7	@ Memphis	W 110–96	Manu Ginóbili (34)	Tim Duncan (9)	Tim Duncan, Beno Udrih (6)	FedEx Forum; 15,227	24–11
36	January 9	Portland	W 98–84	Tim Duncan (16)	Tim Duncan (9)	Beno Udrih (7)	AT&T Center; 18,240	25–11
37	January 10	@ Denver	W 92–83	Tony Parker (26)	Tim Duncan (13)	Tony Parker (7)	Pepsi Center; 16,486	26–11
38	January 13	Washington	W 93–80	Manu Ginóbili (19)	Tim Duncan (11)	Tony Parker (6)	AT&T Center; 18,797	27–11
39	January 15	@ Chicago	L 87–99	Manu Ginóbili (22)	Tim Duncan (16)	Tim Duncan (4)	United Center; 22,218	27–12
40	January 17	L. A. Lakers	L 96–100	Tim Duncan (26)	Tim Duncan (9)	Tony Parker (5)	AT&T Center; 18,797	27–13
41	January 19	New Orleans/Oklahoma City	W 99–86	Tony Parker (23)	Tim Duncan (16)	Manu Ginóbili (6)	AT&T Center; 17,153	28–13
42	January 21	@ Philadelphia	W 99–85	Brent Barry (23)	Tim Duncan (15)	Tony Parker (8)	Wachovia Center; 14,883	29–13
43	January 22	@ Boston	W 93–89	Tim Duncan (21)	Tim Duncan (9)	Tim Duncan, Tony Parker (5)	TD Banknorth Garden; 15,928	30–13
44	January 24	Houston	L 85–90	Tim Duncan (37)	Tim Duncan (10)	Brent Barry, Tony Parker (6)	AT&T Center; 18,328	30–14
45	January 26	Memphis	W 112–96	Tim Duncan (26)	Tim Duncan (13)	Tony Parker (8)	AT&T Center; 18,332	31–14
46	January 28	@ L. A. Lakers	W 96–94	Tim Duncan (21)	Tim Duncan (14)	Tim Duncan (9)	AT&T Center; 18,997	32–14
47	January 31	@ Utah	L 93–97	Tony Parker (27)	Tim Duncan (12)	Tony Parker (6)	EnergySolutions Arena; 19,911	32–15

February: 7–3 (home: 3–0; road: 4–3)

Game	Date	Team	Score	High points	High rebounds	High assists	Location Attendance	Record
48	February 1	@ Phoenix	L 87–103	Manu Ginóbili (32)	Tim Duncan (18)	Tim Duncan (4)	US Airways Center; 18,422	32–16
49	February 7	@ Washington	W 110–86	Tim Duncan, Tony Parker (20)	Francisco Elson (8)	Tony Parker (6)	Verizon Center; 20,173	33–16
50	February 9	@ Orlando	L 104–106	Tim Duncan (24)	Tim Duncan (16)	Tony Parker (7)	Amway Arena; 17,451	33–17
51	February 11	@ Miami	L 85–100	Manu Ginóbili (26)	Tim Duncan (11)	Tony Parker (5)	AmericanAirlines Arena; 20,210	33–18
52	February 13	@ New Jersey	W 107–82	Tim Duncan (21)	Tim Duncan (8)	Jacque Vaughn (5)	Continental Airlines Arena; 14,936	34–18
53	February 14	@ Detroit	W 90–81	Tim Duncan (23)	Francisco Elson (18)	Tony Parker (8)	The Palace of Auburn Hills; 22,076	35–18
All-Star Break
54	February 20	Denver	W 95–80	Tony Parker (17)	Francisco Elson (8)	Tony Parker (5)	AT&T Center; 18,586	36–18
55	February 21	@ Atlanta	W 103–96	Manu Ginóbili (40)	Tim Duncan (9)	Jacque Vaughn (6)	Philips Arena; 15,565	37–18
56	February 24	Seattle	W 102–71	Tony Parker (21)	Tim Duncan (15)	Manu Ginóbili (7)	AT&T Center; 18,797	38–18
57	February 26	Seattle	W 107–91	Tony Parker (27)	Tim Duncan (16)	Tony Parker (9)	AT&T Center; 18,563	39–18

March: 13–2 (home: 7–1; road: 6–1)

Game	Date	Team	Score	High points	High rebounds	High assists	Location Attendance	Record
58	March 2	Orlando	W 98–74	Manu Ginóbili (31)	Tim Duncan (10)	Manu Ginóbili (5)	AT&T Center; 18,797	40–18
59	March 3	@ Houston	W 97–74	Tim Duncan (26)	Francisco Elson (8)	Manu Ginóbili, Jacque Vaughn (6)	Toyota Center; 18,364	41–18
60	March 5	@ L. A. Clippers	W 88–74	Manu Ginóbili (16)	Tim Duncan (12)	Jacque Vaughn (6)	STAPLES Center; 18,655	42–18
61	March 6	@ Portland	W 99–94	Tim Duncan (24)	Tim Duncan (8)	Michael Finley (5)	Rose Garden Arena; 15,911	43–18
62	March 8	@ Sacramento	W 100–93	Manu Ginóbili (31)	Tim Duncan (13)	Tony Parker (5)	ARCO Arena; 17,317	44–18
63	March 10	New Jersey	W 93–77	Tony Parker (19)	Tim Duncan (13)	Tony Parker (6)	AT&T Center; 18,797	45–18
64	March 13	L. A. Clippers	W 93–84	Tony Parker (25)	Tim Duncan (9)	Jacque Vaughn (5)	AT&T Center; 18,797	46–18
65	March 15	@ Milwaukee	L 90–101	Brent Barry (20)	Tim Duncan (13)	Tony Parker (8)	Bradley Center; 13,917	46–19
66	March 17	@ Boston	L 85–91	Tony Parker (30)	Tim Duncan (16)	Manu Ginóbili (6)	AT&T Center; 18,797	46–20
67	March 21	Indiana	W 90–72	Tim Duncan (27)	Matt Bonner (9)	Manu Ginóbili (5)	AT&T Center; 18,580	47–20
68	March 23	Detroit	W 90–89	Tony Parker (22)	Tim Duncan (14)	Tony Parker (7)	AT&T Center; 18,797	48–20
69	March 25	@ Seattle	W 120–79	Manu Ginóbili (19)	Tim Duncan (10)	Tony Parker (7)	KeyArena; 16,409	49–20
70	March 26	@ Golden State	W 126–89	Tony Parker, Tim Duncan, Michael Finley (20)	Francisco Elson (9)	Tony Parker (9)	Oracle Arena; 18,207	50–20
71	March 28	New Orleans	W 92–88	Tim Duncan (31)	Bruce Bowen (9)	Manu Ginóbili (7)	AT&T Center; 18,334	51–20
72	March 30	Utah	W 102–93	Manu Ginóbili (25)	Tim Duncan (14)	Tony Parker (11)	AT&T Center; 18,797	52–20

April: 6–4 (home: 5–1; road: 1–3)

Game	Date	Team	Score	High points	High rebounds	High assists	Location Attendance	Record
73	April 1	@ Indiana	L 99–100	Tony Parker (22)	Tim Duncan (12)	Tony Parker (7)	Conseco Fieldhouse; 13,447	52–21
74	April 3	Seattle	W 110–91	Bruce Bowen (18)	Fabricio Oberto (10)	Tim Duncan (7)	AT&T Center; 18,583	53–21
75	April 5	Phoenix	W 92–85	Tony Parker (35)	Tim Duncan, Michael Finley, Francisco Elson (10)	Tim Duncan (5)	AT&T Center; 18,797	54–21
76	April 7	Golden State	W 112–99	Tim Duncan (28)	Tim Duncan (15)	Manu Ginóbili Tony Parker (7)	AT&T Center; 18,797	55–21
77	April 9	Portland	W 112–96	Tony Parker (30)	Tony Parker, Matt Bonner, Fabricio Oberto (5)	Jacque Vaughn (5)	AT&T Center; 17,852	56–21
78	April 11	Sacramento	W 109–100	Tim Duncan (26)	Tim Duncan (13)	Tony Parker (8)	AT&T Center; 18,797	57–21
79	April 13	@ Minnesota	W 110–91	Manu Ginóbili (21)	Tim Duncan (10)	Brent Barry, Jacque Vaughn (4)	Target Center; 19,356	58–21
80	April 15	@ Dallas	L 86–91	Tony Parker (23)	Tim Duncan, Francisco Elson (7)	Tim Duncan (6)	American Airlines Center; 20,444	58–22
81	April 16	@ Memphis	L 91–101	James White, Michael Finley (17)	Jackie Butler, Matt Bonner (10)	Beno Udrih (9)	FedEx Forum; 13,345	58–23
82	April 18	Denver	L 77–100	Beno Udrih (13)	Jackie Butler (9)	Brent Barry, Beno Udrih (3)	AT&T Center; 18,797	58–24

2006–07 season schedule

== Player statistics ==
=== Regular season ===
Player	POS	GP	GS	MP	REB	AST	STL	BLK	PTS	MPG	RPG	APG	SPG	BPG	PPG
Bruce Bowen	SF	82	82	2,464	223	117	62	25	510	30.0	2.7	1.4	.8	.3	6.2
Michael Finley	SF	82	16	1,823	223	108	32	16	740	22.2	2.7	1.3	.4	.2	9.0
Tim Duncan	C	80	80	2,726	846	273	66	190	1,599	34.1	10.6	3.4	.8	2.4	20.0
Fabricio Oberto	C	79	33	1,365	368	68	25	24	349	17.3	4.7	.9	.3	.3	4.4
Tony Parker	PG	77	77	2,499	250	420	82	6	1,429	32.5	3.2	5.5	1.1	.1	18.6
Manu Ginóbili	SG	75	36	2,060	327	263	109	27	1,240	27.5	4.4	3.5	1.5	.4	16.5
Brent Barry	SG	75	28	1,631	160	138	56	12	635	21.7	2.1	1.8	.7	.2	8.5
Beno Udrih	PG	73	1	948	82	122	27	1	340	13.0	1.1	1.7	.4	.0	4.7
Francisco Elson	C	70	41	1,332	336	55	31	59	350	19.0	4.8	.8	.4	.8	5.0
Robert Horry	PF	68	8	1,124	229	77	45	41	268	16.5	3.4	1.1	.7	.6	3.9
Jacque Vaughn	PG	64	4	760	68	131	24	2	192	11.9	1.1	2.0	.4	.0	3.0
Matt Bonner	PF	56	0	653	156	22	17	11	275	11.7	2.8	.4	.3	.2	4.9
Eric Williams^{†}	SF	16	0	88	14	6	2	0	42	5.5	.9	.4	.1	.0	2.6
Jackie Butler	C	11	2	103	22	5	2	0	41	9.4	2.0	.5	.2	.0	3.7
James White	SG	6	2	137	20	5	3	1	50	22.8	3.3	.8	.5	.2	8.3
Melvin Ely^{†}	C	6	0	65	14	4	4	2	19	10.8	2.3	.7	.7	.3	3.2

- ^{†} Denotes player spent time with another team in the season. Stats reflect time with the Spurs only.

=== Playoffs ===
Player	POS	GP	GS	MP	REB	AST	STL	BLK	PTS	MPG	RPG	APG	SPG	BPG	PPG
Tony Parker	PG	20	20	751	67	115	22	0	415	37.6	3.4	5.8	1.1	.0	20.8
Tim Duncan	C	20	20	736	229	65	13	62	444	36.8	11.5	3.3	.7	3.1	22.2
Bruce Bowen	SF	20	20	689	81	26	28	4	130	34.5	4.1	1.3	1.4	.2	6.5
Michael Finley	SF	20	20	538	58	22	11	4	225	26.9	2.9	1.1	.6	.2	11.3
Fabricio Oberto	C	20	12	415	98	14	6	4	112	20.8	4.9	.7	.3	.2	5.6
Francisco Elson	C	20	8	230	62	2	8	6	66	11.5	3.1	.1	.4	.3	3.3
Manu Ginóbili	SG	20	0	602	109	74	33	4	333	30.1	5.5	3.7	1.7	.2	16.7
Jacque Vaughn	PG	20	0	208	9	28	4	0	43	10.4	.5	1.4	.2	.0	2.2
Brent Barry	SG	19	0	225	25	21	4	2	59	11.8	1.3	1.1	.2	.1	3.1
Robert Horry	PF	18	0	361	70	29	11	24	77	20.1	3.9	1.6	.6	1.3	4.3
Matt Bonner	PF	9	0	25	3	0	2	0	7	2.8	.3	.0	.2	.0	.8
Beno Udrih	PG	8	0	20	1	1	0	0	2	2.5	.1	.1	.0	.0	.3

== Playoffs ==
2007 playoff game log
First Round: 4–1 (home: 2–1; road: 2–0)

Game	Date	Team	Score	High points	High rebounds	High assists	Location Attendance	Series
1	April 24	Denver	L 89–95	Tony Parker (19)	Tim Duncan (10)	Tony Parker (8)	AT&T Center; 18,797	0–1
2	April 27	Denver	W 97–88	Tim Duncan (22)	Fabricio Oberto (10)	Tony Parker (6)	AT&T Center; 18,797	1–1
3	April 30	@ Denver	W 96–91	Tony Parker (21)	Tim Duncan (13)	Tony Parker (6)	Pepsi Center; 19,951	2–1
4	May 2	@ Denver	W 96–89	Tim Duncan (22)	Tim Duncan (11)	Duncan, Ginóbili (6)	Pepsi Center; 19,644	3–1
5	May 4	Denver	W 93–78	Michael Finley (26)	Tim Duncan (12)	Tony Parker (10)	AT&T Center; 18,797	4–1

Conference Semifinals: 4–2 (home: 2–1; road: 2–1)

Game	Date	Team	Score	High points	High rebounds	High assists	Location Attendance	Series
1	May 6	@ Phoenix	W 111–106	Tim Duncan (33)	Tim Duncan (16)	Tony Parker (8)	US Airways Center; 18,422	1–0
2	May 8	@ Phoenix	L 81–101	Tim Duncan (29)	Tim Duncan (11)	Manu Ginóbili (5)	US Airways Center; 18,422	1–1
3	May 12	Phoenix	W 108–101	Tim Duncan (33)	Tim Duncan (19)	Tony Parker (5)	AT&T Center; 18,797	2–1
4	May 14	Phoenix	L 98–104	Tony Parker (23)	Tim Duncan (11)	Tony Parker (7)	AT&T Center; 18,797	2–2
5	May 16	@ Phoenix	W 88–85	Manu Ginóbili (26)	Tim Duncan (12)	Tony Parker (5)	US Airways Center; 18,422	3–2
6	May 18	Phoenix	W 114–106	Manu Ginóbili (33)	Tim Duncan (13)	Parker, Ginóbili (6)	AT&T Center; 18,797	4–2

Conference Finals: 4–1 (home: 3–0; road: 1–1)

Game	Date	Team	Score	High points	High rebounds	High assists	Location Attendance	Series
1	May 20	Utah	W 108–100	Tim Duncan (27)	Tim Duncan (10)	Manu Ginóbili (10)	AT&T Center; 18,300	1–0
2	May 22	Utah	W 105–96	Tim Duncan (26)	Tim Duncan (14)	Tony Parker (14)	AT&T Center; 18,797	2–0
3	May 26	@ Utah	L 83–109	Tony Parker (25)	Tim Duncan (8)	Tony Parker (7)	EnergySolutions Arena; 19,911	2–1
4	May 28	@ Utah	W 91–79	Manu Ginóbili (22)	Fabricio Oberto (11)	Jacque Vaughn (4)	EnergySolutions Arena; 19,911	3–1
5	May 30	Utah	W 109–84	Duncan, Parker (21)	Fabricio Oberto (10)	Jacque Vaughn (6)	AT&T Center; 18,797	4–1

NBA Finals: 4–0 (home: 2–0; road: 2–0)

Game	Date	Team	Score	High points	High rebounds	High assists	Location Attendance	Series
1	June 7	Cleveland	W 85–76	Tony Parker (27)	Tim Duncan (13)	Tony Parker (7)	AT&T Center; 18,797	1–0
2	June 10	Cleveland	W 103–92	Tony Parker (30)	Duncan, Horry (9)	Tim Duncan (8)	AT&T Center; 18,797	2–0
3	June 12	@ Cleveland	W 75–72	Tony Parker (17)	Bowen, Duncan (9)	Manu Ginóbili (5)	Quicken Loans Arena; 20,562	3–0
4	June 14	@ Cleveland	W 83–82	Manu Ginóbili (27)	Tim Duncan (15)	three players tied (3)	Quicken Loans Arena; 20,562	4–0

2007 schedule

== NBA Finals ==
=== Game 1 ===
LeBron James and the Cleveland Cavaliers entered the 2007 Finals as newcomers. Game 1 was the first NBA Finals appearance in franchise history, and the first for each of its players (other than reserve point guard Eric Snow). However, the San Antonio Spurs had been to the Finals in three of the past eight seasons, winning a championship each time. With solid performances by Tim Duncan, Tony Parker, and Manu Ginóbili, the Spurs won the series opener in convincing fashion, limiting LeBron James to 14 points on 4–16 shooting.

ABC, ABCHD, TSN, Canal 7, Canal+, ESPN Brasil

June 7
9:00 pm ET

1

Cleveland Cavaliers 76, San Antonio Spurs 85
Scoring by quarter: 15–20, 20–20, 14–24, 27–21
Pts: Gibson 16; Rebs: James 7 Asts: James, Gibson 4 each TOs: LeBron James 6	Pts: Parker 27; Rebs: Duncan 13; Asts: Tony Parker 7 Blocks: Tim Duncan 5

AT&T Center, San Antonio
Attendance: 18,797
Referees: Ken Mauer, Mike Callahan, Steve Javie

=== Game 2 ===
The Spurs took a stranglehold on momentum in Game 2. The Spurs big three overwhelmed the Cavs and the Spurs led by as many as 29 points in the third quarter. They absolutely dominated game during first 3 quarters and played show-time basketball. A furious 25–6 rally by Cleveland in the final quarter wasn't enough as the Spurs took a 2–0 lead in the series.

ABC, ABCHD, TSN, Canal 7, Canal+, ESPN Brasil

June 10
9:00 pm ET

2

Cleveland Cavaliers 92, San Antonio Spurs 103
Scoring by quarter: 17–28, 16–30, 29–31, 30–14
Pts: LeBron James 25; Rebs: Anderson Varejão 10; Asts: LeBron James 6 TOs: LeBron James 6	Pts: Tony Parker 30; Rebs: Duncan, Horry 9 each Asts: Tim Duncan 8 Blocks: Robert Horry 5

AT&T Center, San Antonio
Attendance: 18,797
Referees: Dick Bavetta, Jim Clark, Joe Derosa

=== Game 3 ===
Rookie Daniel Gibson started Game 3 in place of the injured Larry Hughes but scored a series-low 2 points on 1–10 shooting. As a team the Cavs shot only .367 but out-rebounded the Spurs 48–41. Zydrunas Ilgauskas had a 2006–07 season high 18 rebounds. On the game's final play, LeBron James missed a potential game-tying 29-foot 3-pointer (which he contested as a foul on Bruce Bowen).

Game 3 was the lowest-scoring Finals game since 1955, with Tim Duncan of the Spurs having his lowest scoring game in his NBA Finals career, with 14 points.

ABC, ABCHD, TSN, Canal 7, Canal+, ESPN Brasil

June 12
9:00 pm ET

3

San Antonio Spurs 75, Cleveland Cavaliers 72
Scoring by quarter: 16–18, 24–20, 15–12, 20–22
Pts: Tony Parker 17; Rebs: Duncan, Bowen 9 each Asts: Manu Ginóbili 5 Stls: Michael Finley 4	Pts: LeBron James 25; Rebs: Ilgauskas 18; Asts: LeBron James 7 TOs: LeBron James 5

Quicken Loans Arena, Cleveland
Attendance: 20,562
Referees: Bernie Fryer, Bob Delaney, Dan Crawford

=== Game 4 ===
San Antonio started out strong through the first three quarters, leading by as many as 11. Cleveland would stage a rally near the end of the third quarter and the first five minutes of the fourth, scoring 14 consecutive points to take its first second-half lead of the series. However, the Spurs would stage a 12–3 rally of their own to retake the lead and win the series in a 4–0 sweep.

ABC, ABCHD, TSN, Canal 7, Canal+, ESPN Brasil, Sport 1

June 14
9:00 pm ET

4

San Antonio Spurs 83, Cleveland Cavaliers 82
Scoring by quarter: 19–20, 20–14, 21–18, 22–27
Pts: Manu Ginóbili 27; Rebs: Tim Duncan 15; Asts: Manu Ginóbili 5 TOs: Tim Duncan 6	Pts: LeBron James 24; Rebs: Ilgauskas 13; Asts: LeBron James 10; TOs: LeBron James 6
San Antonio wins series 4–0

Quicken Loans Arena, Cleveland
Attendance: 20,562
Referees: Bennett Salvatore, Joe Forte, Eddie F. Rush

== Award winners ==
- Tony Parker, NBA Finals Most Valuable Player Award
- Tim Duncan, All-NBA First Team
- Tim Duncan, NBA All-Defensive First Team
- Bruce Bowen, NBA All-Defensive First Team
