= Francisco Elson =

Dutch basketball player (born 1976)

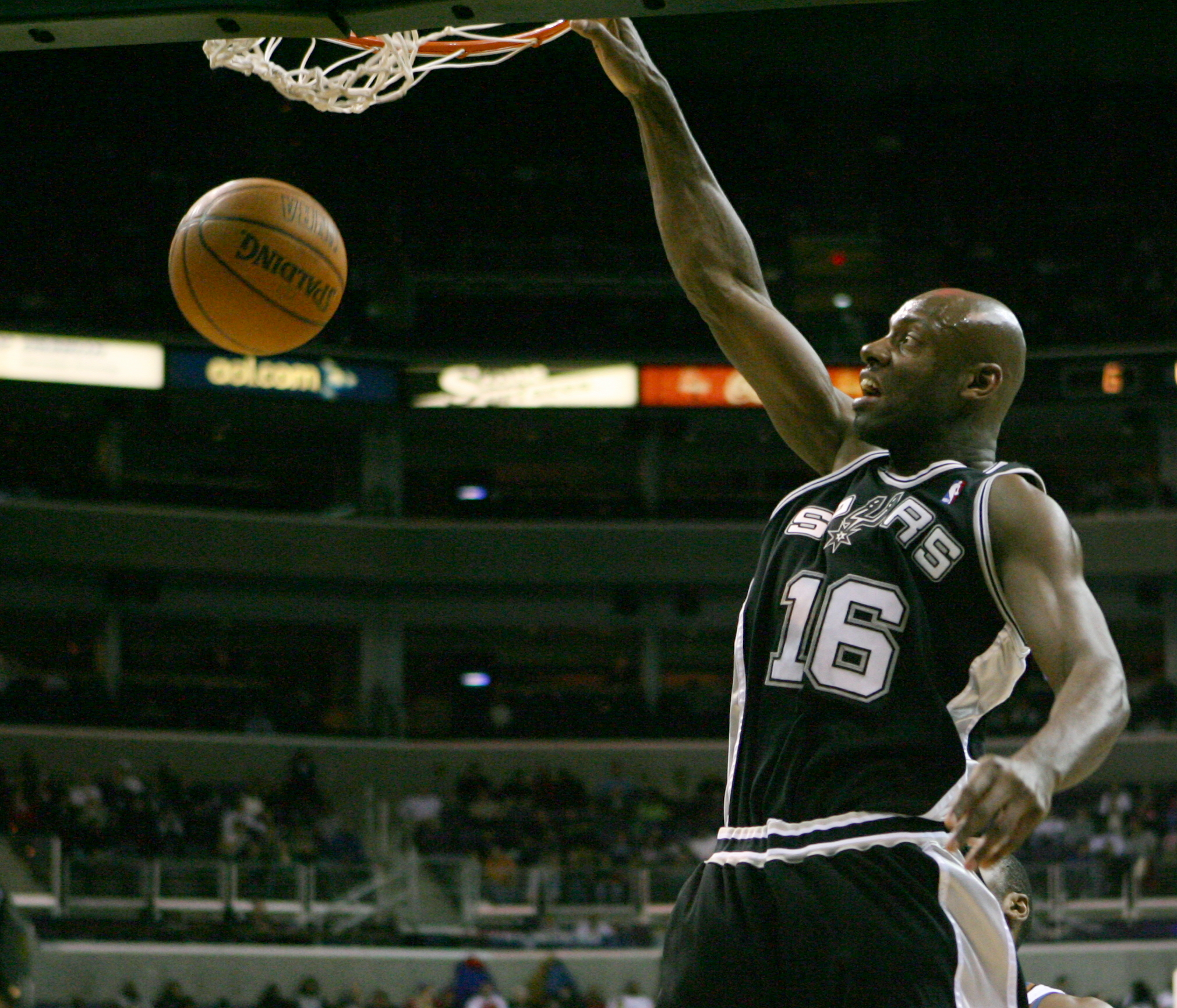
- Elson with the San Antonio Spurs in 2007

Personal information
- Born: 28 February 1976 (age 50) Rotterdam, Netherlands
- Listed height: 7 ft 0 in (2.13 m)
- Listed weight: 235 lb (107 kg)

Career information
- High school: Maria Regina Mavo (Rotterdam, Netherlands)
- College: Kilgore (1995–1997); California (1997–1999)
- NBA draft: 1999: 2nd round, 41st overall pick
- Drafted by: Denver Nuggets
- Playing career: 1994–2013
- Position: Center
- Number: 56, 16, 9, 8

Career history
- 1994–1995: De Schiestreek
- 1999–2001: FC Barcelona Regal
- 2001–2002: Pamesa Valencia
- 2002–2003: Caja San Fernando
- 2003–2006: Denver Nuggets
- 2006–2008: San Antonio Spurs
- 2008: Seattle SuperSonics
- 2008–2010: Milwaukee Bucks
- 2010: Philadelphia 76ers
- 2010–2011: Utah Jazz
- 2012: Philadelphia 76ers
- 2013: Mahram Tehran

Career highlights
- NBA champion (2007); Liga ACB champion (2001); NIT champion (1999)

Career NBA statistics
- Points: 1,726 (3.7 ppg)
- Rebounds: 1,638 (3.5 rpg)
- Blocks: 255 (0.5 bpg)
- Stats at NBA.com
- Stats at Basketball Reference

Francisco Marinho Robby Elson (born 28 February 1976) is a Dutch former professional basketball player. Elson was the seventh Dutch player to play in the National Basketball Association (NBA). Elson served as the captain of the Netherlands national basketball team in international basketball, as he led the team in several EuroBasket qualifying rounds. He was the first Dutch player to become an NBA champion, doing so with the San Antonio Spurs in 2007.

== Youth and college career ==
Elson started his career at AMVJ Rotterdam at the age of twelve. After a couple of years playing, he stopped after his older brother Patrick died of a heart attack while playing basketball at the age of 21. His gym teacher at the Maria School asked him to return to the club at the age of sixteen. He played one game in the Eredivisie, the highest level Dutch league, in the 1994–95 season for Rotterdam.

Elson was a member of the Dutch Under-20 National Team. He played two seasons at Kilgore Junior College in Texas before completing his college at the University of California, Berkeley. As a senior, he helped lead the Bears to the NIT Championship.

Elson was inducted into Kilgore College's Hall of Fame in 2016.

== Professional career ==
Elson was drafted in the second round of the 1999 NBA draft from Cal by the Denver Nuggets, but did not commence play with them until the 2003–04 campaign. He played four years in Spain:

- 1999–2001 with FC Barcelona averaging 3.4 points and 3.9 rebounds in 32 games for his first season and 6.9 points and 4.5 rebounds in 34 games for the second.
- 2001–2002 with Pamesa Valencia averaging 4.1 points and 4.4 rebounds in 34 games.
- 2002–2003 with Caja San Fernando averaging 9.7 point and 8.2 rebounds in 34 games.

Over his first two seasons with Denver, Elson was mostly a reserve. He averaged 3.6 points and 3.1 rebounds per game. In 2005–06, his third season with the Nuggets, Elson played in 72 games and started in 54 of them. He averaged 21.9 minutes, 4.9 points (on 53.2% shooting) and 4.7 rebounds per game.

Elson gained notoriety during Denver's 2004 playoff series with Minnesota through his physical attempts to contain Kevin Garnett. Elson knocked Garnett into the seats behind the basket with a hard foul early in a game and later in the game was hit in the groin by Garnett. Elson caused controversy when he described Garnett as "gay" for the groin shot. Elson later apologized to the gay and lesbian community for his comments.

In July 2006 Elson signed a 2-year, $6 million contract with the San Antonio Spurs. This was to help provide depth at center by replacing Nazr Mohammed and Rasho Nesterovic. Elson split time at center with Fabricio Oberto, with Elson providing rebounding and defense. Elson won his first NBA Championship in 2007 after the Spurs swept the Cleveland Cavaliers.

On 21 February 2008 Elson was traded by the San Antonio Spurs along with Brent Barry to the Sonics in exchange for Kurt Thomas. He spent most of this season coming off the bench for both the Spurs and the Sonics.

Elson later signed a two-year, $3 million contract with the Bucks to serve as Andrew Bogut's primary backup. 2008-09, his first season with the Bucks, was the last of his NBA career where he started games with any regularity.

On 18 February 2010 Elson was traded to the Philadelphia 76ers along with sharpshooter Jodie Meeks in exchange for Primoz Brezec and Royal Ivey. Elson missed most of the season after hernia surgery, and appeared in only one game with his new team.

On 15 September 2010 Elson signed a guaranteed two-year contract with the Utah Jazz. After his contract expired, he returned to the Netherlands for treatment on his knee.

On 27 January 2012 Elson was signed by the Philadelphia 76ers to provide the team with front-court depth because of injuries at the position. He signed two 10-day contracts, then was not re-signed for a third time after Spencer Hawes returned from injury.

In January 2013, Elson signed with Mahram Tehran of the Iranian Basketball Super League.

On 20 June 2013 Elson's retirement was announced on Dutch websites. He later stated that his retirement was just from international basketball. In March 2014, his retirement became official.

== National team career ==
Elson played 60 games for the Netherlands men's national basketball team, after making his debut on 5 June 1998 against Hungary.

== Personal life ==
Elson is fluent in Dutch, Spanish, English, Portuguese. He is of Surinamese descent. His father is half Chinese and half Surinamese. His mother is half Indian and half Surinamese. Elson has a brown belt in karate.

== NBA career statistics ==
Legend
GP	Games played	GS	Games started	MPG	Minutes per game
FG%	Field goal percentage	3P%	3-point field goal percentage	FT%	Free throw percentage
RPG	Rebounds per game	APG	Assists per game	SPG	Steals per game
BPG	Blocks per game	PPG	Points per game	**Bold**	Career high
†	Won an NBA championship

=== Regular season ===
Year	Team	GP	GS	MPG	FG%	3P%	FT%	RPG	APG	SPG	BPG	PPG
2003–04	Denver	62	14	14.1	.472	.000	.667	3.3	.5	.6	.6	3.5
2004–05	Denver	67	11	14.0	.468	**.333**	.570	3.0	.5	.5	.6	3.7
2005–06	Denver	**72**	**54**	**21.9**	**.532**	.200	.662	4.7	.7	**.8**	.6	4.9
2006–07†	San Antonio	70	41	19.0	.511	.000	.775	**4.8**	**.8**	.4	**.8**	**5.0**
2007–08	San Antonio	41	3	13.0	.419	.000	.833	3.3	.4	.2	.3	3.5
2007–08	Seattle	22	2	12.7	.341	.000	.462	3.0	.4	.3	.3	3.0
2008–09	Milwaukee	59	23	16.6	.491	.250	.846	3.9	.5	.6	.6	3.4
2009–10	Milwaukee	11	0	5.6	.308	.000	**1.000**	1.2	.2	.1	.0	.9
2009–10	Philadelphia	1	0	4.0	.500	.000	.000	1.0	.0	.0	.0	2.0
2010–11	Utah	62	1	9.8	.478	.000	.839	1.9	.5	.3	.2	2.2
2011–12	Philadelphia	5	0	3.2	.333	.000	.000	.2	.2	.2	.2	.4
Career		472	149	15.3	.478	.188	.700	3.5	.6	.5	.5	3.7

=== Playoffs ===
Year	Team	GP	GS	MPG	FG%	3P%	FT%	RPG	APG	SPG	BPG	PPG
2004	Denver	4	0	**15.0**	.583	.000	.500	2.3	**.5**	.5	**.3**	**3.8**
2005	Denver	1	0	6.0	.000	.000	.000	3.0	.0	.0	.0	.0
2006	Denver	5	2	**15.0**	**.600**	.000	.000	2.2	.4	**.8**	.0	1.2
2007†	San Antonio	**20**	**8**	11.5	.591	.000	**.700**	**3.1**	.1	.4	**.3**	3.3
Career		30	10	12.4	.581	.000	.682	2.8	.2	.5	.2	2.9

== See also ==
- List of European basketball players in the United States
