= DeSagana Diop =

Senegalese basketball player (born 1982)

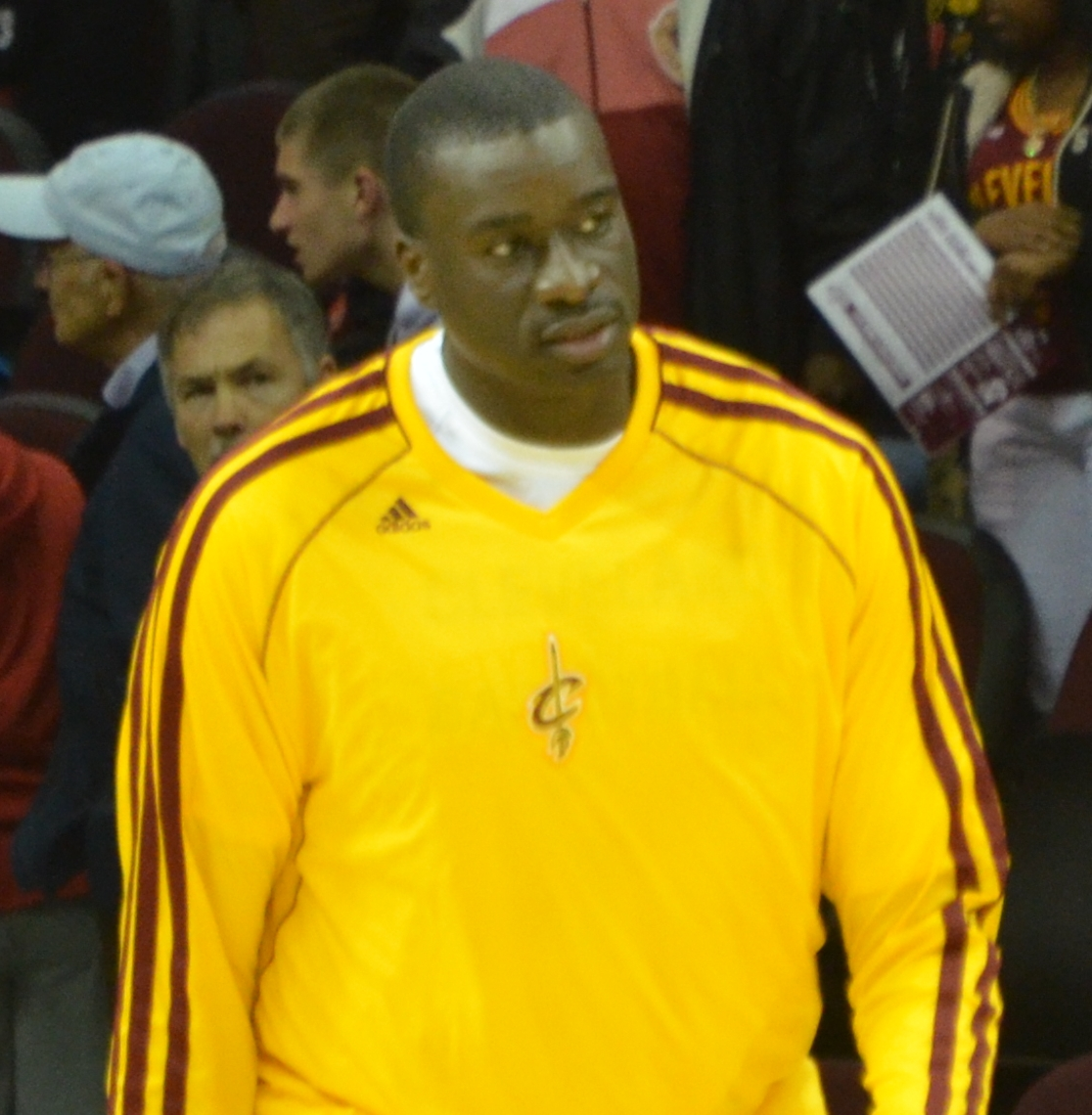
- Diop with the Cleveland Cavaliers in 2013

Westchester Knicks
- Title: Head coach
- League: NBA G League

Personal information
- Born: 30 January 1982 (age 44) Dakar, Senegal
- Listed height: 7 ft 0 in (2.13 m)
- Listed weight: 280 lb (127 kg)

Career information
- High school: Oak Hill Academy (Mouth of Wilson, Virginia)
- NBA draft: 2001: 1st round, 8th overall pick
- Drafted by: Cleveland Cavaliers
- Playing career: 2001–2013
- Position: Center
- Number: 52, 7, 14, 2
- Coaching career: 2014–present

Career history

Playing
- 2001–2005: Cleveland Cavaliers
- 2005–2008: Dallas Mavericks
- 2008: New Jersey Nets
- 2008–2009: Dallas Mavericks
- 2009–2013: Charlotte Bobcats

Career highlights
- As player: First-team Parade All-American (2001); McDonald's All-American (2001)

Career statistics
- Points: 1,185 (2.0 ppg)
- Rebounds: 2,219 (3.7 rpg)
- Blocks: 630 (1.0 bpg)
- Stats at NBA.com
- Stats at Basketball Reference
Medals
Men's basketball
Head coach for Senegal
AfroBasket
Bronze medal – third place	2025 Angola

DeSagana N'gagne Diop (/səˈɡɑːnə ˈdʒɒp/ sə-GAH-nə JOP; born 30 January 1982) is a Senegalese former professional basketball player, and current head coach for the Westchester Knicks of the NBA G League, as well as the Senegal national team.

== Early life ==
Diop played soccer while growing up in Senegal. He began practicing basketball at the age of 15 and moved to the U.S. to play for Oak Hill Academy, where he succeeded in averaging 14.6 points, 13.2 rebounds, and 8.1 blocks during his senior year. He earned the USA Today Virginia Player of the Year title and led Oak Hill Academy in Mouth of Wilson, Virginia, to a #1 nation ranking (33 wins, 0 losses).

Diop speaks five languages: Arabic, English, French, Wolof and some Spanish.

== Professional career ==
=== Cleveland Cavaliers (2001–2005) ===
Diop was drafted directly out of Oak Hill Academy by the Cleveland Cavaliers with the 8th overall pick of the 2001 NBA draft. He was the fifth high school player, after Kwame Brown, Tyson Chandler, Eddy Curry and Ousmane Cisse to declare for the draft. As a reserve center, he played 193 games in four seasons with the Cavaliers, averaging 1.6 points, 2.6 rebounds and 0.8 blocks in 10.8 minutes per contest.

On November 23, 2002, Diop dropped a career-high 10 points in a 97–84 loss to the New Orleans Hornets.

The Cavaliers struggled heavily in Diop's first few years with the team. The franchise eventually began to improve with the addition of an 18-year-old LeBron James in the 2003 NBA draft. In the 2004–05 season, the Cavaliers had posted their best record since the 1997–98 season, going 42–40. However, they still missed the playoffs and this was Diop's final year with the team.

=== Dallas Mavericks (2005–2008) ===
Diop signed a three-year contract with the Dallas Mavericks as a free agent on August 19, 2005. Diop, a defensive player who specialized in shot blocking and rebounding, shared the center position with Erick Dampier. He had joined a winning team, and the 2005–06 season was Diop's most successful season regarding playoff success as the Mavericks went 60–22, made a deep playoff push and reached the 2006 Finals. The Mavericks ended up losing the finals in six games to the Miami Heat.

Against the New York Knicks in a pre-season game, Diop hit the game-winning tip-in off of a missed shot by Keith Van Horn.

On November 15, 2005, Diop recorded a career-high 16 rebounds in an 83–80 win over the Denver Nuggets. In that same game, Diop also recorded a career-high 6 blocks—including a denial of Carmelo Anthony's potentially game-winning field goal attempt.

On January 14, 2006, he became a full-time starter for the Mavericks for the rest of the regular season and into the playoffs, assisting in the Mavericks qualifying for the 2006 NBA Finals as representatives of the Western Conference.

In March 2006, two Mavericks fans produced a version of the hip hop song "Jump" by Kris Kross. In their version, the refrain "Jump! Jump!" was turned into "Diop! Diop!", and the video praises Diop's shotblocking ability. It became so popular that the Mavs started to play the video at their home games. Diop said, "I remember the first time they played the video during a timeout and I was trying to pay attention to what coach [Johnson] was trying to say but I was sneaking looks at the video."

For the 2005–06 season, he ranked 11th in total blocks, 14th in blocks per game, and 4th in blocks per 48 minutes. In Game 7 of the 2006 Western Conference Semifinals between San Antonio and Dallas, Diop, playing with a broken nose, grabbed three offensive rebounds (four total), and blocked two of Tim Duncan's shots in the second and fourth quarters and overtime.

On April 11, 2007, Diop recorded his first double-double with season highs of 10 points and 15 rebounds in the Mavs' franchise-high 30th road victory, a 105–88 win over the Minnesota Timberwolves.

The Mavericks finished the 2006–07 season even more successful than the previous season, with a franchise best 67–15 record. They were extremely dominant throughout the season, and unlike the previous season, they were expected to reach the finals again. They grabbed the first seed in the Western Conference, and matched up with the Golden State Warriors in the first round. The Warriors had gone 42–40 and were barely a winning team that season, they were expected to be heavily outmatched by the Mavericks. However, the Warriors won the series in 6 games, making the Mavericks only the third top seed in NBA history to lose in the first round.

=== New Jersey Nets (2008) ===
On February 19, 2008, Diop was traded to the New Jersey Nets, along with signed-and-traded Keith Van Horn, Devin Harris, Trenton Hassell, Maurice Ager, and roughly $3 million cash and 2008 and 2010 first-round draft picks in exchange for Jason Kidd, Malik Allen, and Antoine Wright.

Diop never achieved the same team success as he did in the 2005–06 and 2006–07 seasons as the Nets entered a stage of rebuilding and finished the 2007–08 season with a mediocre 34–48 record and missed the playoffs.

=== Return to Dallas (2008–2009) ===
On July 9, 2008, Diop signed a six-year, $32 million contract with the Dallas Mavericks.

Diop's return to Dallas was short as he didn't finish the 2008–09 season with the team.

=== Charlotte Bobcats (2009–2013) ===
On January 16, 2009, Diop was traded to the Charlotte Bobcats for guard Matt Carroll and center Ryan Hollins.

Diop spent the rest of his playing career with the Charlotte Bobcats. The Bobcats had been a struggling team for the past few years prior but they had been steadily improving and finished the 2008–09 season 35–47 and missed the playoffs by four wins. In the following 2009–10 season, the Bobcats, led by All-Star Gerald Wallace and leader Stephen Jackson, went 44–38 and made the playoffs as the 7th seed in the Eastern Conference. They lost to the Orlando Magic in a four-game sweep. Diop continued to play for the team; however, the roster had drastically changed in the following seasons and he missed the playoffs for the rest of his career. In the following season the Bobcats only went 34–48 and the team's roster had shifted as Charlotte entered another rebuild. In the 2011–12 season the Bobcats made history by having the worst record in NBA history, ending the season with a 7–59 record. In an especially embarrassing moment, Diop missed a free throw attempt that fell several feet short of the baseline in a January 28 102-99 loss to the Washington Wizards. Diop only played one more season with the Bobcats and they missed the playoffs in the 2012–13 season. On March 4, 2013, Diop played his final NBA game; a 105–122 loss hosted by the Portland Trail Blazers, in which he recorded two points, two rebounds, one block and a foul in over 15 minutes of playing time.

On September 30, 2013, Diop signed with the Cleveland Cavaliers. However, he was waived on October 25 before the season started.

Diop retired from the NBA shortly after at 31 years old.

== Coaching career ==
On November 11, 2014, Diop joined the coaching staff of the Texas Legends of the NBA Development League as a player development coach. On October 19, 2015, he was promoted to assistant coach.

On October 3, 2016, Diop was hired by the Utah Jazz as a coaching associate.

On November 30, 2020, Diop was hired by the Houston Rockets as an assistant coach.

Prior to the 2022-23 season, Diop left the Rockets organization and was appointed head coach of the Westchester Knicks, the New York Knicks' G League affiliate.

On August 12, 2025, it was announced that Diop was the head coach for the Senegal men's national basketball team in the upcoming FIBA AfroBasket tournament.

== NBA career statistics ==
Legend
GP	Games played	GS	Games started	MPG	Minutes per game
FG%	Field goal percentage	3P%	3-point field goal percentage	FT%	Free throw percentage
RPG	Rebounds per game	APG	Assists per game	SPG	Steals per game
BPG	Blocks per game	PPG	Points per game	**Bold**	Career high

=== Regular season ===
Year	Team	GP	GS	MPG	FG%	3P%	FT%	RPG	APG	SPG	BPG	PPG
2001–02	Cleveland	18	1	6.1	.414	.000	.200	.9	.3	.1	.6	1.4
2002–03	Cleveland	80	1	11.8	.351	.000	.367	2.7	.5	.4	1.0	1.5
2003–04	Cleveland	56	3	13.0	.388	.000	**.600**	3.6	.6	**.5**	.9	2.3
2004–05	Cleveland	39	0	7.8	.290	.000	.000	1.8	.4	.2	.7	1.0
2005–06	Dallas	**81**	**45**	**18.6**	.487	**.500**	.542	4.6	.3	**.5**	**1.8**	2.3
2006–07	Dallas	**81**	9	18.3	.470	.000	.558	**5.4**	.4	**.5**	1.4	2.3
2007–08	Dallas	52	18	17.2	**.583**	.000	**.600**	5.2	.5	.4	1.2	**3.0**
2007–08	New Jersey	27	5	14.9	.415	.000	.467	4.5	.5	.2	.9	2.5
2008–09	Dallas	34	0	13.3	.379	.000	.414	3.5	.4	.4	.7	1.6
2008–09	Charlotte	41	1	14.2	.460	.000	.270	3.8	.5	.4	.8	2.8
2009–10	Charlotte	27	0	9.7	.517	.000	.222	2.4	.2	.2	.5	1.2
2010–11	Charlotte	16	0	11.3	.333	.000	.364	2.5	.4	.3	.9	1.3
2011–12	Charlotte	27	9	12.0	.357	.000	.167	3.1	**.9**	.2	.5	1.1
2012–13	Charlotte	22	1	10.3	.296	.000	.000	2.3	.6	.2	.7	.7
Career		601	93	14.0	.427	.167	.467	3.7	.4	.4	1.0	2.0

=== Playoffs ===
Year	Team	GP	GS	MPG	FG%	3P%	FT%	RPG	APG	SPG	BPG	PPG
2006	Dallas	**22**	**18**	18.5	**.615**	.000	**.611**	5.0	.1	**.6**	1.3	2.7
2007	Dallas	6	3	**23.3**	.600	.000	.429	**6.8**	**.3**	.5	**1.7**	**3.5**
Career		28	21	19.5	.611	.000	.560	5.4	.1	.6	1.4	2.9

== See also ==
- List of foreign NBA coaches
