= 2006–07 Dallas Mavericks season =

NBA professional basketball team season

- Division champions
- Head coach: Avery Johnson
- President: Donnie Nelson
- General manager: Donnie Nelson
- Owner: Mark Cuban
- Arena: American Airlines Center

Results
- Record: 67–15 (.817)
- Place: Division: 1st (Southwest); Conference: 1st (Western)
- Playoff finish: First Round (Lost to Warriors 2–4)
- Stats at Basketball Reference

Local media
- Television: FSN Southwest; KTXA
- Radio: KESN

The 2006–07 Dallas Mavericks season was the team's 27th in the NBA. The Mavericks entered the season as the runners-up of the 2006 NBA Finals, where they lost to the Miami Heat in six games. They began the season hoping to improve upon their 60–22 output from the previous season. They improved by seven wins, finishing 67–15, claiming the top seed in the Western Conference, and qualifying for the playoffs for the seventh consecutive season. In the first round, they met the eight-seeded Golden State Warriors, and lost in six games in a shocking upset. The Mavericks became the third first-seeded team in NBA history to be eliminated by an eighth-seeded team in the playoffs, following the Seattle SuperSonics in 1994, and the Miami Heat in 1999. The Mavericks had the second best team offensive rating in the NBA.

This would be the last time a 67-win team was eliminated before the Conference Finals until 2016, when the San Antonio Spurs were eliminated by the Oklahoma City Thunder in six games in the Conference Semifinals.

== Draft picks ==
Round	Pick	Player	Position	Nationality	College
1	28	Maurice Ager	SG	United States	Michigan State
2	58	J. R. Pinnock		United States	George Washington

== Roster ==
2006–07 Dallas Mavericks roster
Players

Pos.	No.	Player	Height	Weight	DOB	From
G	13	Maurice Ager	6 ft 5 in (1.96 m)	202 lb (92 kg)	1984–02–09	Michigan State
G	11	J. J. Barea	6 ft 0 in (1.83 m)	175 lb (79 kg)	1984–06–26	Northeastern
G	1	Greg Buckner	6 ft 4 in (1.93 m)	210 lb (95 kg)	1976–09–16	Clemson
F	44	Austin Croshere	6 ft 9 in (2.06 m)	235 lb (107 kg)	1975–05–01	Providence
C	25	Erick Dampier	6 ft 11 in (2.11 m)	265 lb (120 kg)	1975–07–14	Mississippi State
C	7	DeSagana Diop	7 ft 0 in (2.13 m)	300 lb (136 kg)	1982–01–30	Senegal
F	40	Devean George	6 ft 8 in (2.03 m)	220 lb (100 kg)	1977–08–29	Augsburg
G	34	Devin Harris	6 ft 3 in (1.91 m)	185 lb (84 kg)	1983–02–27	Wisconsin
F	5	Josh Howard	6 ft 7 in (2.01 m)	210 lb (95 kg)	1980–04–28	Wake Forest
C	28	D.J. Mbenga	7 ft 0 in (2.13 m)	245 lb (111 kg)	1980–12–30	DR Congo
G	8	Anthony Johnson	6 ft 3 in (1.91 m)	190 lb (86 kg)	1975–10–02	College of Charleston
F	21	Pops Mensah-Bonsu	6 ft 9 in (2.06 m)	240 lb (109 kg)	1983–09–07	George Washington
F	41	Dirk Nowitzki	7 ft 0 in (2.13 m)	237 lb (108 kg)	1978–06–19	Germany
F	42	Jerry Stackhouse	6 ft 6 in (1.98 m)	218 lb (99 kg)	1974–11–05	North Carolina
SG	31	Jason Terry	6 ft 2 in (1.88 m)	176 lb (80 kg)	1977–09–15	Arizona
F	45	Kevin Willis	7 ft 0 in (2.13 m)	220 lb (100 kg)	1962–09–06	Michigan State

Coaches
Head coach
- Avery Johnson
Assistant(s)
- Brad Davis (player development)
- Popeye Jones
- Joe Prunty
- Sam Vincent

Legend
- (DP) Unsigned draft pick
- (FA) Free agent
- (S) Suspended
- Injured

Roster
Updated: April 10, 2007

== Regular season ==
=== Standings ===
Southwest Division	W	L	PCT	GB	Home	Road	Div
z-Dallas Mavericks	67	15	.817	-	36–5	31–10	14–2
x-San Antonio Spurs	58	24	.707	9	31–10	27–14	10–6
x-Houston Rockets	52	30	.634	15	28–13	24–17	8–8
New Orleans/Oklahoma City Hornets	39	43	.476	28	24–17	15–26	6–10
Memphis Grizzlies	22	60	.268	45	14–27	8–33	2–14

#	Western Conference				
#	Team	W	L	PCT	GB
1	z-Dallas Mavericks	67	15	.817	-
2	y-Phoenix Suns	61	21	.744	6
3	x-San Antonio Spurs	58	24	.707	9
4	y-Utah Jazz	51	31	.622	16
5	x-Houston Rockets	52	30	.634	15
6	x-Denver Nuggets	45	37	.549	22
7	x-Los Angeles Lakers	42	40	.512	25
8	x-Golden State Warriors	42	40	.512	25
9	Los Angeles Clippers	40	42	.488	27
10	New Orleans/Oklahoma City Hornets	39	43	.476	28
11	Sacramento Kings	33	49	.402	34
12	Portland Trail Blazers	32	50	.390	35
13	Minnesota Timberwolves	32	50	.390	35
14	Seattle SuperSonics	31	51	.378	36
15	Memphis Grizzlies	22	60	.268	45

=== Game log ===
2006–07 game log
Total: 67–15 (Home: 36–5; Road: 31–10)
November: 11–4 (home: 6–2; road: 5–2)

Game	Date	Team	Score	High points	High rebounds	High assists	Location Attendance	Record
1	November 2	San Antonio	L 91–97	Dirk Nowitzki (21)	Dirk Nowitzki (11)	Howard & Terry (4)	American Airlines Center; 20,416	0–1
2	November 4	@ Houston	L 76–107	Dirk Nowitzki (24)	Erick Dampier (9)	Jason Terry (4)	Toyota Center; 18,245	0–2
3	November 6	Golden State	L 104–107	Dirk Nowitzki (26)	Dirk Nowitzki (11)	Nowitzki & Terry (6)	American Airlines Center; 20,093	0–3
4	November 8	@ L.A. Clippers	L 85–103	Jason Terry (23)	Dirk Nowitzki (12)	Devin Harris (5)	Staples Center; 18,538	0–4
5	November 9	@ Phoenix	W 119–112	Dirk Nowitzki (35)	Nowitzki & Dampier (7)	Anthony Johnson (6)	U.S. Airways Center; 18,422	1–4
6	November 12	@ Portland	W 103–96	Dirk Nowitzki (26)	Dirk Nowitzki (10)	Jerry Stackhouse (9)	Rose Garden; 15,005	2–4
7	November 14	Chicago	W 111–99	Dirk Nowitzki (31)	Erick Dampier (13)	Terry & Harris (5)	American Airlines Center; 20,274	3–4
8	November 17	@ Memphis	W 115–103	Dirk Nowitzki (26)	Erick Dampier (15)	Devin Harris (7)	FedEx Forum; 16,727	4–4
9	November 18	Memphis	W 89–84	Dirk Nowitzki (24)	Dirk Nowitzki (13)	Anthony Johnson (9)	American Airlines Center; 20,535	5–4
10	November 20	@ Charlotte	W 93–85	Dirk Nowitzki (24)	Erick Dampier (15)	Devin Harris (6)	Charlotte Bobcats Arena; 13,237	6–4
11	November 21	Washington	W 107–80	Dirk Nowitzki (30)	Dirk Nowitzki (14)	Nowitzki & Stackhouse (5)	American Airlines Center; 20,080	7–4
12	November 24	@ San Antonio	W 95–92	Dirk Nowitzki (31)	Dirk Nowitzki (10)	Jason Terry (10)	AT&T Center; 18,581	8–4
13	November 25	New Orleans/Oklahoma City	W 85–73	Dirk Nowitzki (28)	Nowitzki & Diop (9)	Jason Terry (6)	American Airlines Center; 20,315	9–4
14	November 27	Minnesota	W 93–87	Nowitzki & Howard (15)	Erick Dampier (11)	Devin Harris (4)	American Airlines Center; 19,939	10–4
15	November 29	Toronto	W 117–98	Josh Howard (26)	Erick Dampier (14)	Anthony Johnson (8)	American Airlines Center; 19,975	11–4

December : 13–3 (home: 8–1; road: 5–2)

Game	Date	Team	Score	High points	High rebounds	High assists	Location Attendance	Record
16	December 1	Sacramento	W 109–90	Josh Howard (24)	Nowitzki & Diop (10)	Anthony Johnson (10)	American Airlines Center; 20,277	12–4
17	December 4	@ Washington	L 97–106	Dirk Nowitzki (27)	Nowitzki & Dampier (9)	Jerry Stackhouse (6)	Verizon Center; 14,891	12–5
18	December 5	@ New Jersey	W 92–75	Dirk Nowitzki (26)	Dirk Nowitzki (13)	Jason Terry (7)	Continental Airlines Arena; 16,794	13–5
19	December 7	Detroit	L 82–92	Dirk Nowitzki (29)	Josh Howard (12)	Devin Harris (4)	American Airlines Center; 20,152	13–6
20	December 9	Denver	W 105–90	Josh Howard (30)	Josh Howard (11)	Devin Harris, Jason Terry (6)	American Airlines Center; 20,343	14–6
21	December 11	@ Utah	L 79–101	Dirk Nowitzki (26)	Dirk Nowitzki (10)	Devin Harris (3)	EnergySolutions Arena; 19,911	14–7
22	December 13	L. A. Lakers	W 110–101	Josh Howard (29)	Dirk Nowitzki (14)	Jason Terry (9)	American Airlines Center; 20,424	15–7
23	December 15	Philadelphia	W 93–79	Jason Terry (18)	Josh Howard, Erick Dampier (8)	Dirk Nowitzki (5)	American Airlines Center; 20,219	16–7
24	December 16	@ New Orleans/Oklahoma City	W 90–79	Josh Howard (23)	Dirk Nowitzki (10)	Jason Terry (6)	New Orleans Arena; 16,331	17–7
25	December 18	@ Sacramento	W 109–91	Dirk Nowitzki (29)	Dirk Nowitzki (13)	Devin Harris, Jason Terry (6)	Arco Arena; 17,317	18–7
26	December 20	@ Seattle	W 103–95	Erick Dampier (22)	Erick Dampier (16)	Jason Terry (6)	KeyArena; 16,867	19–7
27	December 22	L. A. Clippers	W 115–83	Josh Howard (25)	Dirk Nowitzki (12)	Jason Terry (7)	American Airlines Arena; 20,311	20–7
28	December 26	Charlotte	W 97–84	Josh Howard (27)	Erick Dampier (10)	Jason Terry (7)	American Airlines Center; 20,423	21–7
29	December 28	@ Phoenix	W 101–99	Jason Terry (35)	Josh Howard (12)	Jason Terry (8)	American Airlines Center; 20,483	22–7
30	December 30	New Orleans/Oklahoma City	W 94–80	Jason Terry (25)	Erick Dampier (9)	Jason Terry (6)	American Airlines Center; 20,433	23–7
31	December 31	@ Denver	W 89–85	Josh Howard (28)	Josh Howard (17)	Jason Terry (6)	Pepsi Center; 18,423	24–7

January: 14–2 (home: 7–0; road: 7–2)

Game	Date	Team	Score	High points	High rebounds	High assists	Location Attendance	Record
32	January 2	Seattle	W 112–88	Dirk Nowitzki (31)	Dirk Nowitzki (15)	Jason Terry (5)	American Airlines Center; 20,245	25–7
33	January 4	Indiana	W 100–91	Josh Howard (25)	Josh Howard (11)	Devin Harris (5)	American Airlines Center; 20,398	26–7
34	January 5	@ San Antonio	W 90–85	Dirk Nowitzki (36)	Josh Howard (11)	Jason Terry (8)	AT&T Center; 18,797	27–7
35	January 7	@ L. A. Lakers	L 98–101	Dirk Nowitzki (29)	Dirk Nowitzki (13)	Jason Terry (7)	Staples Center; 18,997	27–8
36	January 9	@ Utah	W 108–105	Dirk Nowitzki (38)	Josh Howard (9)	Jason Terry (6)	EnergySolutions Arena; 19,911	28–8
37	January 10	@ Portland	W 99–74	Jason Terry (20)	Erick Dampier (10)	Dirk Nowitzki (5)	American Airlines Center; 20,256	29–8
38	January 12	@ Indiana	W 115–113 (OT)	Dirk Nowitzki (43)	Dirk Nowitzki (12)	Jason Terry (7)	Conseco Fieldhouse; 15,934	30–8
39	January 14	@ Toronto	W 97–96	Dirk Nowitzki (38)	Dirk Nowitzki (11)	Dirk Nowitzki, Josh Howard, Devin Harris (5)	Air Canada Centre; 19,800	31–8
40	January 16	Houston	W 109–96	Dirk Nowitzki (30)	Dirk Nowitzki (10)	Jason Terry (8)	American Airlines Center; 20,332	32–8
41	January 18	L. A. Lakers	W 114–95	Josh Howard (29)	Josh Howard (11)	Jason Terry (13)	American Airlines Center; 20,446	33–8
42	January 21	@ Miami	W 99–93	Josh Howard (25)	Dirk Nowitzki, Erick Dampier (11)	Jason Terry (11)	AmericanAirlines Arena; 20,195	34–8
43	January 23	@ Orlando	W 111–95	Dirk Nowitzki (33)	Dirk Nowitzki (10)	Dirk Nowitzki (8)	Amway Arena; 17,451	35–8
44	January 25	@ Chicago	L 85–96	Dirk Nowitzki (28)	Dirk Nowitzki (11)	Jason Terry (6)	United Center; 21,822	35–9
45	January 27	Sacramento	W 106–104	Dirk Nowitzki (32)	Dirk Nowitzki (11)	Jason Terry (7)	American Airlines Center; 20,487	36–9
46	January 30	Seattle	W 122–102	Austin Croshere (34)	Austin Croshere (7)	Jason Terry, Jerry Stackhouse, Devin Harris (4)	American Airlines Center; 20,326	37–9
47	January 31	@ Memphis	W 95–94	Dirk Nowitzki (26)	Dirk Nowitzki (11)	Jason Terry (6)	FedEx Forum; 14,762	38–9

February: 10–0 (home: 6–0; road: 4–0)

Game	Date	Team	Score	High points	High rebounds	High assists	Location Attendance	Record
48	February 3	Minnesota	W 94–93	Josh Howard, Jason Terry (22)	DeSagana Diop (12)	Devin Harris (6)	American Airlines Center; 20,467	39–9
49	February 7	Memphis	W 113–97	Dirk Nowitzki (38)	Dirk Nowitzki (10)	Devin Harris (8)	American Airlines Center; 20,263	40–9
50	February 9	Houston	W 95–74	Josh Howard (22)	DeSagana Diop (14)	Jerry Stackhouse (5)	American Airlines Center; 20,446	41–9
51	February 11	@ Philadelphia	W 106–89	Dirk Nowitzki (24)	Dirk Nowitzki (11)	Jason Terry (11)	Wachovia Center; 13,673	42–9
52	February 13	@ Milwaukee	W 99–93	Dirk Nowitzki (38)	Dirk Nowitzki (11)	Jason Terry (10)	Bradley Center; 16,514	43–9
53	February 15	@ Houston	W 80–77	Dirk Nowitzki (26)	Josh Howard (11)	Josh Howard, Jerry Stackhouse (3)	Toyota Center; 18,270	44–9
All-Star Break
54	February 22	Miami	W 112–100	Dirk Nowitzki (31)	Dirk Nowitzki (11)	Dirk Nowitzki (6)	American Airlines Center; 20,448	45–9
55	February 24	Denver	W 115–95	Dirk Nowitzki (31)	Dirk Nowitzki (11)	Dirk Nowitzki (8)	American Airlines Center; 20,455	46–9
56	February 26	Atlanta	W 110–87	Dirk Nowitzki (27)	Dirk Nowitzki (8)	Jerry Stackhouse (9)	American Airlines Center; 20,245	47–9
57	February 27	@ Minnesota	W 91–65	Dirk Nowitzki (23)	Dirk Nowitzki (14)	Jason Terry (7)	Target Center; 13,326	48–9

March: 13–2 (home: 6–1; road: 7–1)

Game	Date	Team	Score	High points	High rebounds	High assists	Location Attendance	Record
58	March 1	Cleveland	W 95–92	Dirk Nowitzki (24)	Dirk Nowitzki (11)	Dirk Nowitzki (7)	American Airlines Center; 20,428	49–9
59	March 3	Orlando	W 103–98	Jason Terry (29)	Dirk Nowitzki (9)	Jason Terry (15)	American Airlines Center; 20,468	50–9
60	March 6	New Jersey	W 102–89	Jason Terry (24)	Erick Dampier (14)	Dirk Nowitzki (5)	American Airlines Center; 20,360	51–9
61	March 11	@ L. A. Lakers	W 108–72	Josh Howard (24)	DeSagana Diop (13)	Devin Harris (4)	STAPLES Center; 18,997	52–9
62	March 12	@ Golden State	L 100–117	Jason Terry, Devin Harris (16)	Austin Croshere (13)	Devin Harris (5)	Oracle Arena; 18,377	52–10
63	March 14	Phoenix	L 127–129	Jerry Stackhouse (33)	Dirk Nowitzki (16)	Dirk Nowitzki (6)	American Airlines Center; 20,525	52–11
64	March 16	Boston	W 106–101	Josh Howard, Dirk Nowitzki (30)	Dirk Nowitzki (12)	Dirk Nowitzki (4)	American Airlines Center; 20,428	53–11
65	March 18	@ Detroit	W 92–88	Dirk Nowitzki (28)	Dirk Nowitzki (12)	Jason Terry (6)	The Palace of Auburn Hills; 22,076	54–11
66	March 20	@ New York	W 92–77	Josh Howard‚ Dirk Nowitzki (24)	Erick Dampier (13)	Jason Terry (6)	Madison Square Garden; 19,763	55–11
67	March 21	@ Cleveland	W 98–90	Dirk Nowitzki (23)	Dirk Nowitzki, Erick Dampier (9)	Dirk Nowitzki, Devin Harris, Jerry Stackhouse (6)	Quicken Loans Arena; 20,562	56–11
68	March 23	@ Boston	W 109–95	Jason Terry (29)	Josh Howard, DeSagana Diop (11)	Devin Harris, Jason Terry, Jerry Stackhouse (6)	TD Garden; 18,113	57–11
69	March 25	@ Atlanta	W 104–97	Dirk Nowitzki, Josh Howard (28)	DeSagana Diop (9)	Jerry Stackhouse (8)	Philips Arena; 19,322	58–11
70	March 27	@ New Orleans/Oklahoma City	W 105–89	Josh Howard (25)	Josh Howard (10)	Jason Terry, Jerry Stackhouse (7)	Ford Center; 19,164	59–11
71	March 28	Milwaukee	W 105–103	Jason Terry (27)	Erick Dampier (10)	Devin Harrism Jason Terry (5)	American Airlines Center; 20,398	60–11
72	March 30	New York	W 105–103	Dirk Nowitzki (30)	Erick Dampier (10)	Jerry Stackhouse, Devin Harris (6)	American Airlines Center; 20,468	61–11

April: 6–4 (home: 3–1; road: 3–3)

Game	Date	Team	Score	High points	High rebounds	High assists	Location Attendance	Record
73	April 1	@ Phoenix	L 104–126	Josh Howard (28)	Josh Howard (7)	Dirk Nowitzki (6)	US Airways Center; 18,422	61–12
74	April 3	@ Sacramento	W 97–93	Josh Howard (29)	Josh Howard, Devean George (8)	Jason Terry, Jerry Stackhouse (5)	Arco Arena; 17,317	62–12
75	April 6	@ Denver	L 71–75	Dirk Nowitzki (22)	Erick Dampier (13)	Devin Harris (5)	Pepsi Center; 19,752	62–13
76	April 7	Portland	W 86–74	Jason Terry (29)	Austin Croshere, DeSagana Diop (10)	Devin Harris (4)	American Airlines Center; 20,573	63–13
77	April 9	L. A. Clippers	W 96–86	Dirk Nowitzki (26)	DeSagana Diop (9)	Jason Terry (6)	American Airlines Center; 20,402	64–13
78	April 11	@ Minnesota	W 105–88	Austin Croshere (19)	DeSagana Diop (15)	Jason Terry (6)	Target Center; 13,671	65–13
79	April 13	Utah	L 89–104	Dirk Nowitzki (23)	Dirk Nowitzki, DeSagana Diop (4)	Devin Harris (8)	American Airlines Center; 20,411	65–14
80	April 15	San Antonio	W 91–86	Dirk Nowitzki, Devin Harris (21)	DeSagana Diop (9)	Jason Terry (6)	American Airlines Center; 20,444	66–14
81	April 17	@ Golden State	L 82–111	Maurice Ager (20)	J. J. Barea (10)	J. J. Barea, Greg Buckner (3)	Oracle Arena; 20,073	66–15
82	April 18	@ Seattle	W 106–75	Dirk Nowitzki (20)	Erick Dampier (6)	Dirk Nowitzki, Jason Terry (5)	KeyArena; 16,117	67–15

2006–07 season schedule

== Playoffs ==
2007 playoff game log
First Round: 2–4 (home: 2–1; road: 0–3)

Game	Date	Team	Score	High points	High rebounds	High assists	Location Attendance	Series
1	April 22	Golden State	L 85–97	Josh Howard (21)	Josh Howard (13)	Dirk Nowitzki (4)	American Airlines Center; 20,732	0–1
2	April 25	Golden State	W 112–99	Jason Terry (28)	Josh Howard (11)	Harris, Stackhouse (4)	American Airlines Center; 20,867	1–1
3	April 27	@ Golden State	L 91–109	Nowitzki, Howard (20)	Dirk Nowitzki (12)	Terry, Harris (5)	Oracle Arena; 20,629	1–2
4	April 29	@ Golden State	L 99–103	Dirk Nowitzki (23)	Dirk Nowitzki (15)	Jason Terry (4)	Oracle Arena; 20,672	1–3
5	May 1	Golden State	W 118–112	Dirk Nowitzki (30)	Dirk Nowitzki (12)	Devin Harris (7)	American Airlines Center; 21,041	2–3
6	May 3	@ Golden State	L 86–111	Howard, Stackhouse (20)	Dirk Nowitzki (10)	Devin Harris (9)	Oracle Arena; 20,677	2–4

2007 schedule

== Player statistics ==
=== Regular season ===
Player	POS	GP	GS	MP	REB	AST	STL	BLK	PTS	MPG	RPG	APG	SPG	BPG	PPG
Jason Terry	SG	81	80	2,846	231	422	81	17	1,350	35.1	2.9	5.2	1.0	.2	16.7
DeSagana Diop	C	81	9	1,480	438	30	40	113	190	18.3	5.4	.4	.5	1.4	2.3
Devin Harris	PG	80	61	2,081	196	296	96	21	813	26.0	2.5	3.7	1.2	.3	10.2
Dirk Nowitzki	PF	78	78	2,820	693	263	52	62	1,916	36.2	8.9	3.4	.7	.8	24.6
Erick Dampier	C	76	73	1,915	566	44	24	82	537	25.2	7.4	.6	.3	1.1	7.1
Greg Buckner	SG	76	11	1,372	158	70	47	7	305	18.1	2.1	.9	.6	.1	4.0
Josh Howard	SF	70	69	2,455	475	127	82	56	1,321	35.1	6.8	1.8	1.2	.8	18.9
Jerry Stackhouse	SF	67	8	1,615	145	187	51	10	804	24.1	2.2	2.8	.8	.1	12.0
Austin Croshere	PF	61	2	727	186	44	14	6	227	11.9	3.0	.7	.2	.1	3.7
Devean George	SF	60	17	1,283	213	33	46	23	381	21.4	3.6	.6	.8	.4	6.4
Anthony Johnson^{†}	PG	40	0	562	48	78	16	1	152	14.1	1.2	2.0	.4	.0	3.8
J. J. Barea	PG	33	1	191	25	24	1	1	78	5.8	.8	.7	.0	.0	2.4
Maurice Ager	SG	32	1	214	21	7	4	3	69	6.7	.7	.2	.1	.1	2.2
D. J. Mbenga	C	21	0	79	11	6	3	5	17	3.8	.5	.3	.1	.2	.8
Pops Mensah-Bonsu	PF	12	0	71	21	0	1	0	29	5.9	1.8	.0	.1	.0	2.4
Kevin Willis	PF	5	0	43	8	1	2	1	12	8.6	1.6	.2	.4	.2	2.4

- ^{†} Denotes player spent time with another team in the season. Stats reflect time with the Mavericks only.

=== Playoffs ===
Player	POS	GP	GS	MP	REB	AST	STL	BLK	PTS	MPG	RPG	APG	SPG	BPG	PPG
Josh Howard	SF	6	6	248	59	17	13	5	128	41.3	9.8	2.8	2.2	.8	21.3
Dirk Nowitzki	PF	6	6	239	68	14	11	8	118	39.8	11.3	2.3	1.8	1.3	19.7
Jason Terry	SG	6	6	229	14	22	5	2	102	38.2	2.3	3.7	.8	.3	17.0
Devin Harris	PG	6	6	163	12	30	6	1	79	27.2	2.0	5.0	1.0	.2	13.2
DeSagana Diop	C	6	3	140	41	2	3	10	21	23.3	6.8	.3	.5	1.7	3.5
Devean George	SF	6	1	109	18	4	6	2	21	18.2	3.0	.7	1.0	.3	3.5
Jerry Stackhouse	SF	6	0	169	22	15	4	1	86	28.2	3.7	2.5	.7	.2	14.3
Greg Buckner	SG	6	0	44	6	2	2	1	1	7.3	1.0	.3	.3	.2	.2
Erick Dampier	C	5	2	38	17	1	0	0	5	7.6	3.4	.2	.0	.0	1.0
Austin Croshere	PF	3	0	34	6	0	0	0	15	11.3	2.0	.0	.0	.0	5.0
Maurice Ager	SG	3	0	24	3	0	0	0	15	8.0	1.0	.0	.0	.0	5.0
J. J. Barea	PG	2	0	4	0	0	0	0	0	2.0	.0	.0	.0	.0	.0

== Awards and records ==
- Dirk Nowitzki, NBA Most Valuable Player Award
- Dirk Nowitzki, All-NBA First Team
- Dirk Nowitzki, NBA All-Star
- Dirk Nowitzki, Player of the Month (Feb 07)
- Dirk Nowitzki, Player of the Week (11/19/06, 01/14/07)
- Josh Howard, NBA All-Star
- Josh Howard, Player of the Week (12/24/06, 12/31/06)

== Notable transactions ==
- Maurice Ager was selected as the #28 pick in the First Round of the 2006 NBA draft by the Dallas Mavericks. Maurice Ager signed a multi-year contract with the Dallas Mavericks on July 1, 2006.
- Josh Howard was selected as the #29 pick in the First Round of the 2003 NBA draft by the Dallas Mavericks. Josh Howard signed a multi-year contract with the Dallas Mavericks on July 3, 2003. Josh Howard signed a multi-year extension with the Dallas Mavericks on October 28, 2006.
- Austin Croshere was acquired in a trade by the Dallas Mavericks from the Indiana Pacers on July 12, 2006.
- Jason Terry was acquired in a trade by the Dallas Mavericks from the Atlanta Hawks on September 4, 2004. Jason Terry re-signed to a multi-year contract as a free agent with the Dallas Mavericks on July 24, 2006.
- Jose Barea signed a multi-year contract as a free agent with the Dallas Mavericks on August 16, 2006.
- Greg Buckner signed a multi-year contract as a free agent with the Dallas Mavericks on July 13, 2006.
- Devean George signed a multi-year contract as a free agent with the Dallas Mavericks on August 2, 2006.
- D. J. Mbenga signed a multi-year contract with the Dallas Mavericks on July 14, 2004. D.J. Mbenga re-signed to a multi-year contract as a free agent with the Dallas Mavericks on July 12, 2006.
- Pops Mensah-Bonsu signed a multi-year contract as a free agent with the Dallas Mavericks on August 3, 2006.
- Kevin Willis signed a contract with the Dallas Mavericks on April 2, 2007. Kevin Willis re-signed to a contract as a free agent with the Dallas Mavericks on April 12, 2007.
