= Jackie Butler =

American basketball player (born 1985)

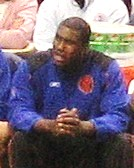
- Butler with the New York Knicks in 2006

Personal information
- Born: March 10, 1985 (age 41) McComb, Mississippi, U.S.
- Listed height: 6 ft 10 in (2.08 m)
- Listed weight: 260 lb (118 kg)

Career information
- High school: McComb (McComb, Mississippi); Coastal Christian Academy (Virginia Beach, Virginia)
- NBA draft: 2004: undrafted
- Playing career: 2004–2007
- Position: Center / power forward
- Number: 45

Career history
- 2004–2005: Great Lakes Storm
- 2005–2006: New York Knicks
- 2006–2007: San Antonio Spurs

Career highlights
- NBA champion (2007); All-CBA First Team (2005); CBA Rookie of the Year (2005); CBA All-Rookie Team (2005); McDonald's All-American (2003); Second-team Parade All-American (2003); Mississippi Mr. Basketball (2002)
- Stats at NBA.com
- Stats at Basketball Reference

Jackie Butler (born March 10, 1985) is an American former professional basketball player. He attended McComb High School in McComb, Mississippi, and transferred to Coastal Christian Academy in Virginia Beach for his final high school season.

Butler skipped college and declared for the 2004 NBA draft, but was not selected. He joined the Great Lakes Storm of the Continental Basketball Association (CBA), and won Rookie of the Year whilst also being named to the All-CBA First Team. Butler signed with the New York Knicks in February 2005. In July 2006, he signed with the San Antonio Spurs, whom he won the 2007 NBA Finals with.

== Early life ==
Butler was born in McComb, Mississippi and attended McComb High School and originally committed to play at Mississippi State University but failed to qualify academically. He enrolled at Laurinburg Institute in North Carolina for academic purposes but he departed after a reported altercation with a teammate. He then transferred to Coastal Christian Academy prep school in Virginia Beach. Although he wanted to sign with the University of Tennessee in 2004, he decided to declare for the 2004 NBA draft, the first player that year to do so.

== Professional career ==
=== Great Lakers Storm (2004–2005) ===
Butler went undrafted in the 2004 NBA draft and signed as a free agent with the Minnesota Timberwolves but was cut before the season began. Butler began the 2004–05 season with the Continental Basketball Association (CBA) where over 40 games with the Great Lakes Storm he averaged 18.1 points, 10.7 rebounds, and 1.5 blocks per game. He was named the CBA Rookie of the Year and selected to the All-CBA First Team.

=== New York Knicks (2005–2006) ===
On February 27, 2005, Butler signed with the New York Knicks for the rest of the 2004–05 NBA season, scoring ten points over three games. He later was drafted in the 2005 AAPBL draft. However, the league folded soon thereafter.

When Larry Brown was hired as the New York Knicks' head coach, it was unclear what sort of role Butler would have. After the preseason, Brown publicly commented on how happy he was with Butler, and considered him his fourth rookie (after Channing Frye, Nate Robinson, and David Lee). After a rocky start, Butler was soon praised as being the Knicks' best center, with Eddy Curry and Jerome James having disappointing starts to their Knicks careers. For the 2005–06 NBA season Butler played in 55 games averaging 13.5 minutes, 5.3 points (54.4% field goal accuracy) and 3.3 rebounds per game. He earned US$641,748 with the Knicks.

=== San Antonio Spurs (2006–2007) ===
In July 2006, Butler signed a three-year, US$7 million contract with the San Antonio Spurs. He was considered a long-term project. Spurs coach Gregg Popovich said on October 26, 2006, "most of his playing time in the initial part of the season is going to be in practice, learning what a work ethic is day in and day out and what it takes to play at this level." Butler never played with the Spurs during the 2007 NBA Playoffs, but the Spurs won the 2007 NBA Finals.

On July 12, 2007, the Spurs traded Butler and the rights to Luis Scola to the Houston Rockets for Vasileios Spanoulis, a 2009 second-round draft pick and cash. He played on the Rockets' 2007 summer league team, but was waived in the 2007–08 NBA preseason (October 2007).

== Career statistics ==
Legend
GP	Games played	GS	Games started	MPG	Minutes per game
FG%	Field goal percentage	3P%	3-point field goal percentage	FT%	Free throw percentage
RPG	Rebounds per game	APG	Assists per game	SPG	Steals per game
BPG	Blocks per game	PPG	Points per game	**Bold**	Career high

=== NBA ===
Year	Team	GP	GS	MPG	FG%	3P%	FT%	RPG	APG	SPG	BPG	PPG
2004–05	New York	3	0	1.7	**1.000**	—	**1.000**	.0	.0	**.3**	.0	3.3
2005–06	New York	**55**	0	**13.5**	.544	—	.753	**3.3**	**.5**	**.3**	**.6**	**5.3**
2006–07†	San Antonio	11	**2**	9.4	.457	—	.900	2.0	**.5**	.2	.0	3.7
Career		69	2	12.3	.539	—	.775	3.0	.4	.3	.4	5.0
