= Collateral ligament of thumb =

Collateral ligament of thumb may refer to:

- Ulnar collateral ligament of thumb
- Radial collateral ligament of thumb
