= Alonzo Gee =

American basketball player (born 1987)

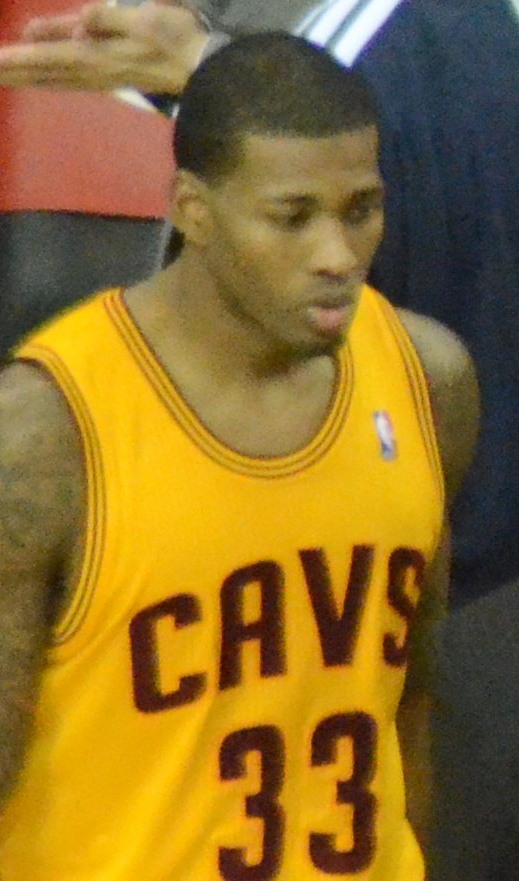
- Gee with the Cleveland Cavaliers in 2012

Personal information
- Born: May 29, 1987 (age 39) Riviera Beach, Florida, U.S.
- Listed height: 6 ft 6 in (1.98 m)
- Listed weight: 220 lb (100 kg)

Career information
- High school: William T. Dwyer (Palm Beach Gardens, Florida)
- College: Alabama (2005–2009)
- NBA draft: 2009: undrafted
- Playing career: 2009–2022
- Position: Shooting guard / small forward
- Number: 24, 23, 15, 33, 1, 7

Career history
- 2009–2010: Austin Toros
- 2010: Washington Wizards
- 2010: San Antonio Spurs
- 2010: →Austin Toros
- 2010: Washington Wizards
- 2010–2014: Cleveland Cavaliers
- 2011: Asseco Prokom Gdynia
- 2014–2015: Denver Nuggets
- 2015: Portland Trail Blazers
- 2015–2016: New Orleans Pelicans
- 2016–2017: Denver Nuggets
- 2017–2018: Sioux Falls Skyforce
- 2018: Caciques de Humacao
- 2018: Brisbane Bullets
- 2019: Phoenix Pulse Fuel Masters
- 2021–2022: Taichung Wagor Suns

Career highlights
- NBA D-League All-Star (2010); All-NBA D-League Second Team (2010); NBA D-League Rookie of the Year (2010); Second-team All-SEC (2009); SEC All-Freshman Team (2006)
- Stats at NBA.com
- Stats at Basketball Reference

Alonzo Edward Gee (born May 29, 1987) is an American former professional basketball player. Born and raised in Riviera Beach, Florida, Gee attended the University of Alabama, where he played for the Alabama Crimson Tide men's basketball team for four seasons.

== High school career ==
Gee attended William T. Dwyer High School in Palm Beach Gardens, Florida where he led them to Class 5A state titles in 2004 and 2005. As a junior in 2003–04, he averaged 15 points and seven rebounds per game as he earned All-State Tournament team and honorable mention All-State honors. He was also awarded the Most Valuable Player of the 2004 Adidas Showcase national tournament.

On November 16, 2004, he signed a National Letter of Intent to play college basketball for the University of Alabama.

As a senior in 2004–05, he averaged 21.3 points and 6.8 rebounds per game as was named the Class 5A State Tournament Most Valuable Player and the South Florida Sun-Sentinel Player of the Year. He also earned all-state first team honors.

Considered a four-star recruit by Rivals.com, Gee was listed as the No. 10 shooting guard and the No. 33 player in the nation in 2005.

== College career ==
In his freshman season at Alabama, Gee was named to the All-SEC Freshman team after averaging 8.6 points and 3.4 rebounds in 31 games.

In his sophomore season, he was named the Most Valuable Player of the Paradise Jam Tournament after scoring 12 points against Middle Tennessee, 21 points against Iowa and 13 points against Xavier while shooting 54.5 percent from the field in three games as the Tide won the tournament championship. In 32 games (all starts), he averaged 12.6 points and 5.3 rebounds per game. He also scored a then career high 26 points against Coppin State University.

In his junior season, he scored his 1,000th career point against Tennessee on January 29, 2008. He earned All-Tournament team honors at the Findlay Toyota Las Vegas Classic. He was also named to the All-SEC Preseason second team by the league's coaches. In 33 games (all starts), he averaged 14.5 points and 5.2 rebounds per game.

In his senior season, he was named to the All-SEC second team after averaging 15.0 points and 7.2 rebounds in 32 games.

Gee finished his basketball career at Alabama by being one of 41 players to score 1000 points in the career, as well as 127 assists, 120 steals and 35 blocked shots.

== Professional career ==
=== Austin Toros (2009–2010) ===
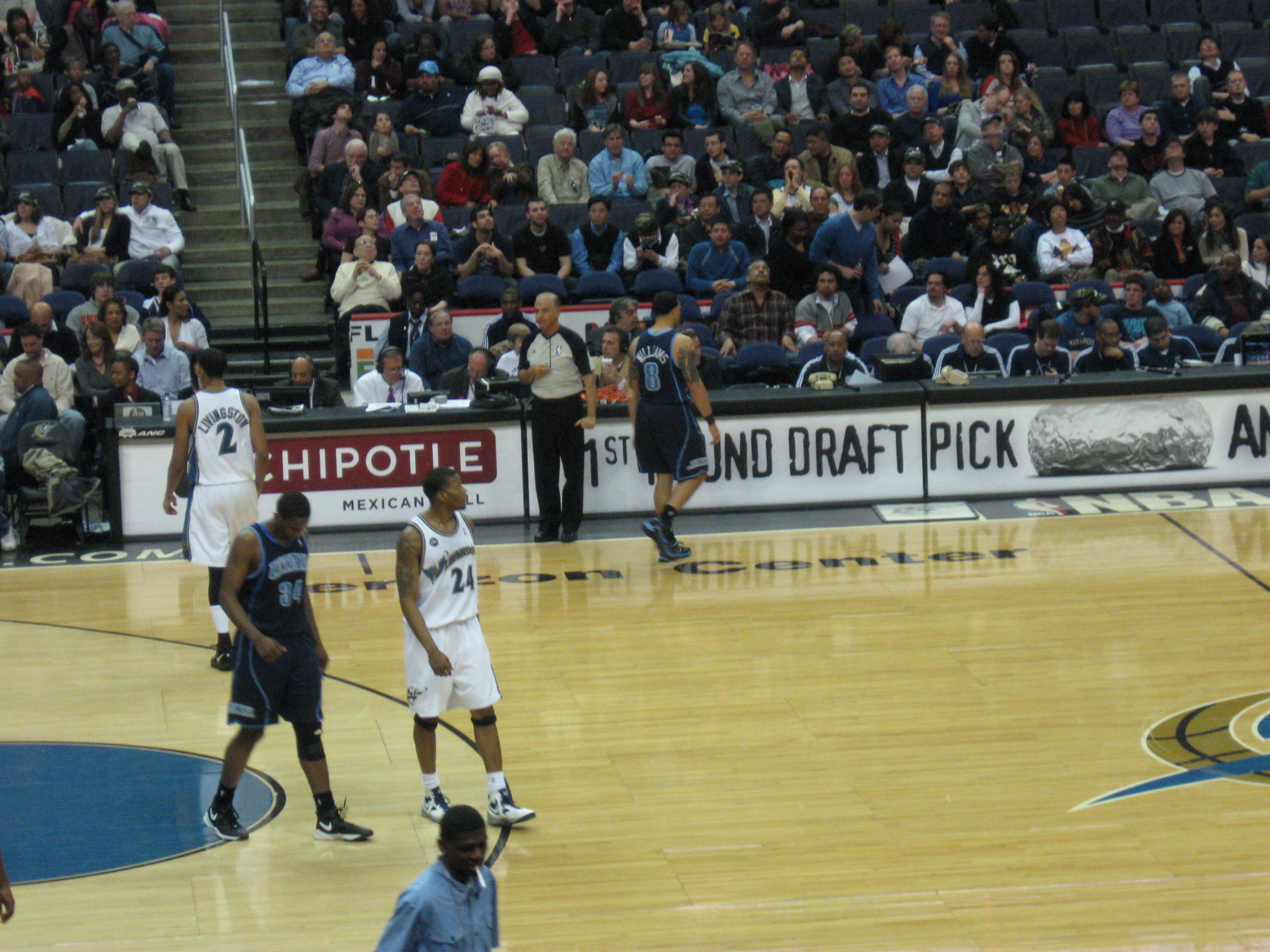
Gee (right) of the Washington Wizards walks next to C. J. Miles of the Utah Jazz during a game in March 2010

After going undrafted in the 2009 NBA draft, Gee joined the San Antonio Spurs for the 2009 NBA Summer League. On September 27, 2009, he signed with the Minnesota Timberwolves. However, he was later waived by the Timberwolves on October 6, 2009. On November 5, 2009, he was selected with the sixth overall pick in the 2009 NBA D-League draft by the Austin Toros. In 36 games (35 starts) for the Toros, he averaged 21.0 points and 6.6 rebounds per game.

=== Washington Wizards (2010) ===
On March 7, 2010, Gee signed a 10-day contract with the Washington Wizards. Four days later, he made his NBA debut in a game against the Atlanta Hawks, recording two points and two rebounds in seven minutes of action. On March 18, 2010, he signed a second 10-day contract with the Wizards.

=== San Antonio Spurs (2010) ===
After his second 10-day contract expired with the Wizards, on March 29, 2010, Gee signed with the San Antonio Spurs. On April 8, 2010, he was assigned to the Austin Toros. On April 17, 2010, he was named the 2010 NBA D-League Rookie of the Year. Six days later, he was recalled by the Spurs.

In July 2010, he joined the Spurs for the 2010 NBA Summer League. On November 16, 2010, he was waived by the Spurs just nine games into the season.

=== Return to Washington (2010) ===
On November 22, 2010, Gee signed with the Washington Wizards, returning to the franchise for a second stint. On December 20, 2010, he was waived by the Wizards after just 11 games.

=== Cleveland Cavaliers (2010–2014) ===
On December 28, 2010, Gee signed with the Cleveland Cavaliers.

On August 28, 2011, he signed with Asseco Prokom Gdynia of Poland for the duration of the NBA lockout. In November 2011, he parted ways with Asseco Gdynia and returned to the United States citing personal reasons. In December 2011, following the conclusion of the lockout, he re-joined the Cavaliers.

On June 30, 2012, the Cavaliers extended a $2.7 million qualifying offer to Gee, thereby making him a restricted free agent. On September 10, 2012, he re-signed with the Cavaliers on a three-year, $9.75 million deal.

=== Denver Nuggets (2014–2015) ===
On July 11, 2014, Gee was traded to the New Orleans Pelicans in exchange for future draft considerations. Four days later, he was traded to the Houston Rockets.

On September 17, 2014, Gee was traded, along with Scotty Hopson, to the Sacramento Kings in exchange for Jason Terry and two future second-round draft picks. On September 25, 2014, he was waived by the Kings.

On September 30, 2014, Gee signed with the Denver Nuggets.

=== Portland Trail Blazers (2015) ===
On February 19, 2015, Gee was traded, along with Arron Afflalo, to the Portland Trail Blazers in exchange for Will Barton, Víctor Claver, Thomas Robinson and a lottery-protected 2016 first-round pick.

=== New Orleans Pelicans (2015–2016) ===
On July 16, 2015, Gee signed with the New Orleans Pelicans. He appeared in 73 games for the Pelicans in 2015–16 before suffering a complete rupture of the right proximal rectus femoris on March 28 against the New York Knicks. The injury subsequently ruled him out for the rest of the season.

On July 22, 2016, Gee re-signed with the Pelicans, but was waived on October 24.

=== Return to Denver (2016–2017) ===
On November 16, 2016, Gee signed with the Denver Nuggets, returning to the franchise for a second stint. On January 6, 2017, he was waived by the Nuggets. Two days later, he signed a 10-day contract with the Nuggets.

=== Sioux Falls Skyforce (2017–2018) ===
On December 16, 2017, Gee was acquired by the Sioux Falls Skyforce of the NBA G League.

=== Caciques de Humacao (2018) ===
On April 13, 2018, Caciques de Humacao was reported to have signed Gee.

=== Brisbane Bullets (2018) ===
On August 30, 2018, Gee signed with the Brisbane Bullets for the 2018–19 NBL season. On October 27, 2018, he was released by the Bullets for personal reasons.

=== Bivouac (2021) ===
In June 2021, Alonzo Gee was drafted by Bivouac with the eighth overall pick of the 2021 BIG3 SuperDraft.

=== Taichung Wagor Suns (2021–2022) ===
On September 23, 2021, Gee signed with the Taichung Suns for the T1 League. On January 8, 2022, Taichung Wagor Suns indicated that Gee went back to the United States for taking care of his grandmother.

=== Triplets (2022–present) ===
On May 25, 2022, Alonzo Gee was drafted by the Triplets with the seventeenth overall pick of the 2022 BIG3 draft.

== Post-playing career ==
On September 25, 2026, the Minnesota Timberwolves hired Gee to serve as their manager of pro scouting, as well as the assistant general manager for the Iowa Wolves of the NBA G League.

== NBA career statistics ==
Legend
GP	Games played	GS	Games started	MPG	Minutes per game
FG%	Field goal percentage	3P%	3-point field goal percentage	FT%	Free throw percentage
RPG	Rebounds per game	APG	Assists per game	SPG	Steals per game
BPG	Blocks per game	PPG	Points per game	**Bold**	Career high
*	Led the league

=== Regular season ===
Year	Team	GP	GS	MPG	FG%	3P%	FT%	RPG	APG	SPG	BPG	PPG
2009–10	Washington	11	2	16.5	.475	**.778**	.621	3.0	.6	.6	.1	7.4
2010–11	San Antonio	5	0	3.6	.333	.000	.000	.6	.0	.0	**.4**	.4
2010–11	Washington	11	5	11.5	.444	.000	.667	2.0	.5	.6	.0	2.9
2010–11	Cleveland	40	29	24.3	.462	.347	**.800**	3.9	.8	.8	**.4**	7.4
2011–12	Cleveland	63	31	29.0	.412	.321	.788	**5.1**	**1.8**	**1.3**	.3	**10.6**
2012–13	Cleveland	**82***	**82***	**31.0**	.410	.315	.795	3.9	1.6	**1.3**	**.4**	10.3
2013–14	Cleveland	65	65	30.7	.415	.328	.705	3.3	1.7	1.1	.2	10.0
2014–15	Denver	39	0	13.1	.482	.417	.738	1.8	.5	.7	.2	4.9
2014–15	Portland	15	2	10.1	.429	.273	.500	1.6	.4	.5	.1	3.4
2015–16	New Orleans	73	38	22.4	**.518**	.283	.667	3.4	1.0	.9	.2	4.5
2016–17	Denver	13	0	6.8	.214	.000	.556	1.1	.5	.4	.1	.8
Career		417	213	21.8	.434	.325	.754	3.3	1.1	.9	.2	6.6

=== Playoffs ===
Year	Team	GP	GS	MPG	FG%	3P%	FT%	RPG	APG	SPG	BPG	PPG
2015	Portland	1	0	3.0	.000	.000	.000	1.0	1.0	.0	.0	.0
Career		1	0	3.0	.000	.000	.000	1.0	1.0	.0	.0	.0

== Personal life ==
Gee is the son of Darlene Gee, and has two older siblings, Lorenzo and Angela.
