= Radial collateral ligament =

Radial collateral ligament can refer to:

- Radial collateral ligament of elbow joint
- Radial collateral ligament of wrist joint
- Radial collateral ligament of thumb
