= 2009–10 Washington Wizards season =

NBA professional basketball team season

- Head coach: Flip Saunders
- Owners: Abe Pollin
- Arena: Verizon Center

Results
- Record: 26–56 (.317)
- Place: Division: 5th (Southeast); Conference: 14th (Eastern)
- Playoff finish: Did not qualify
- Stats at Basketball Reference

Local media
- Television: CSN Mid-Atlantic, The CW Washington, News Channel 8
- Radio: 106.7 The Fan

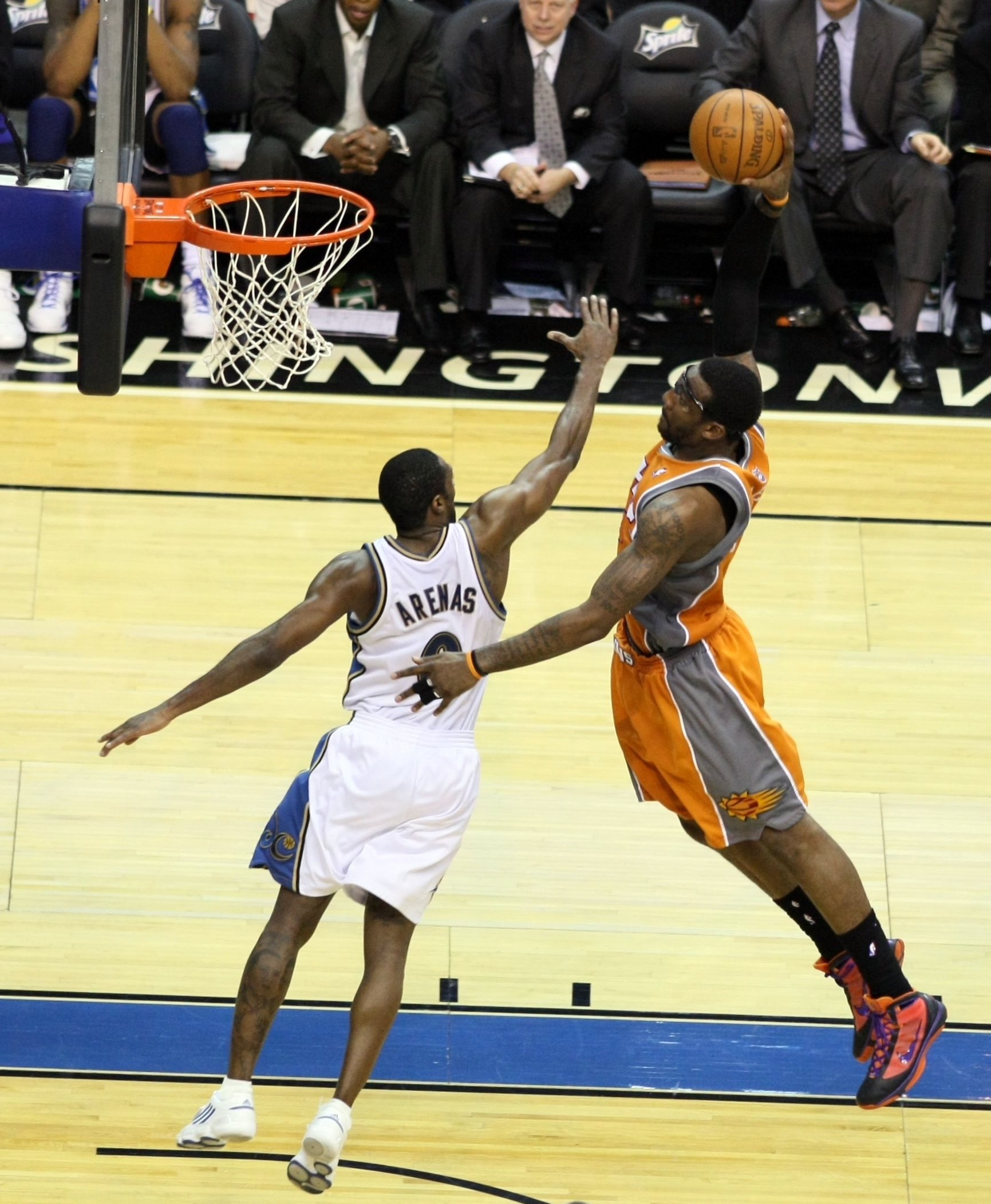

The 2009–10 Washington Wizards season was the 49th season of the Washington Wizards in the National Basketball Association (NBA).

The season was remembered for the off-the-court drama between Javaris Crittenton and Gilbert Arenas. Arenas and Crittenton got into a heated dispute over a high-stakes team card game called Bourré. The argument began on a team flight back from Phoenix over a $1,100 pot and escalated two days later when Arenas brought four guns to the locker room, challenging Crittenton to "PICK 1". Crittenton responded by pulling out his own loaded gun, cocking it, and pointing it directly at Arenas while teammates scrambled to flee the locker room. Crittenton was released by the team following his season-long suspension by the NBA, while Arenas rejoined the team the next season.

== Key dates ==
- June 25, 2009 - The 2009 NBA draft took place in New York City.
- July 8, 2009 - The free agency period started.
- January 6, 2010 - Commissioner David Stern suspended guard Gilbert Arenas indefinitely following his actions involving the use of guns in the team locker room.
- January 27, 2010 - Commissioner Stern suspends Arenas and Javaris Crittenton for the remainder of the season as a result of the use of guns in a team locker room.

== Roster ==
2009–10 Washington Wizards roster
Players

Pos.	No.	Player	Height	Weight	DOB	From
G	0	Gilbert Arenas (S)	6 ft 4 in (1.93 m)	215 lb (98 kg)	1982-01-06	Arizona
F/C	7	Andray Blatche	6 ft 11 in (2.11 m)	248 lb (112 kg)	1986-08-22	South Kent School
G	12	Earl Boykins	5 ft 5 in (1.65 m)	133 lb (60 kg)	1976-06-02	Eastern Michigan
G	8	Javaris Crittenton (S)	6 ft 5 in (1.96 m)	200 lb (91 kg)	1987-12-31	Georgia Tech
G	15	Randy Foye (injured) (IN)	6 ft 4 in (1.93 m)	213 lb (97 kg)	1983-09-24	Villanova
G/F	5	Josh Howard (injured) (IN)	6 ft 7 in (2.01 m)	210 lb (95 kg)	1980-04-28	Wake Forest
G	9	Cedric Jackson	6 ft 3 in (1.91 m)	190 lb (86 kg)	1986-03-05	Cleveland State
G	2	Shaun Livingston	6 ft 7 in (2.01 m)	185 lb (84 kg)	1985-09-11	Peoria Central HS (IL)
G/F	20	Cartier Martin	6 ft 7 in (2.01 m)	220 lb (100 kg)	1984-11-20	Kansas State
F/C	34	JaVale McGee	7 ft 0 in (2.13 m)	237 lb (108 kg)	1988-01-19	Nevada
G/F	6	Mike Miller	6 ft 8 in (2.03 m)	218 lb (99 kg)	1980-02-19	Florida
C	21	Fabricio Oberto	6 ft 10 in (2.08 m)	245 lb (111 kg)	1975-03-21	Argentina
G/F	3	Quinton Ross	6 ft 6 in (1.98 m)	193 lb (88 kg)	1981-04-30	SMU
F	22	James Singleton	6 ft 8 in (2.03 m)	230 lb (104 kg)	1981-07-20	Murray State
F	14	Al Thornton	6 ft 8 in (2.03 m)	235 lb (107 kg)	1983-12-07	Florida State
SG	1	Nick Young	6 ft 6 in (1.98 m)	200 lb (91 kg)	1985-06-01	USC

Coaches
Head coach
- Flip Saunders
Assistant(s)
- Randy Wittman
- Don Zierden
- Sam Cassell
- Wes Unseld Jr.
- Ryan Saunders
- Mike Wells
- Gene Banks

Legend
- (DP) Unsigned draft pick
- (FA) Free agent
- (S) Suspended
- Injured

== Regular season ==
=== Standings ===
Southeast Division	W	L	PCT	GB	Home	Road	Div
y-Orlando Magic	59	23	.720	–	34–7	25–16	10–6
x-Atlanta Hawks	53	29	.646	6	34–7	19–22	8–8
x-Miami Heat	47	35	.573	12	24–17	23–18	9–7
x-Charlotte Bobcats	44	38	.537	15	31–10	13–28	10–6
Washington Wizards	26	56	.317	33	15–26	11–30	3–13

#	Eastern Conference				
#	Team	W	L	PCT	GB
1	z-Cleveland Cavaliers	61	21	.744	–
2	y-Orlando Magic	59	23	.720	2
3	x-Atlanta Hawks	53	29	.646	8
4	y-Boston Celtics	50	32	.610	11
5	x-Miami Heat	47	35	.573	14
6	x-Milwaukee Bucks	46	36	.561	15
7	x-Charlotte Bobcats	44	38	.537	17
8	x-Chicago Bulls	41	41	.500	20
9	Toronto Raptors	40	42	.488	21
10	Indiana Pacers	32	50	.390	29
11	New York Knicks	29	53	.354	32
12	Philadelphia 76ers	27	55	.329	34
13	Detroit Pistons	27	55	.329	34
14	Washington Wizards	26	56	.317	35
15	New Jersey Nets	12	70	.146	49

=== Game log ===
2009–10 game log
Total: 26–56 (Home: 15–26; Road: 11–30)
October: 2–1 (home: 1–0; road: 1–1)

Game	Date	Team	Score	High points	High rebounds	High assists	Location Attendance	Record
1	October 27	@ Dallas	W 102–91	Gilbert Arenas (29)	Brendan Haywood (10)	Gilbert Arenas (9)	American Airlines Center; 19,871	1–0
2	October 30	@ Atlanta	L 89–100	Gilbert Arenas (23)	Mike Miller (10)	Randy Foye (6)	Philips Arena; 17,079	1-1
3	October 31	New Jersey	W 102–91	Gilbert Arenas (32)	Mike Miller (11)	Randy Foye (8)	Verizon Center; 20,173	2–1

November: 3–9 (home: 2–4; road: 1–5)

Game	Date	Team	Score	High points	High rebounds	High assists	Location Attendance	Record
4	November 3	@ Cleveland	L 90–102	Gilbert Arenas, Caron Butler (22)	Brendan Haywood (9)	Gilbert Arenas (5)	Quicken Loans Arena; 20,562	2-2
5	November 4	Miami	L 89–93	Gilbert Arenas (32)	Brendan Haywood (11)	Gilbert Arenas, Mike Miller & Fabricio Oberto (3)	Verizon Center; 17,413	2–3
6	November 6	@ Indiana	L 86–102	Caron Butler (24)	Brendan Haywood (19)	Gilbert Arenas (5)	Conseco Fieldhouse; 14,556	2–4
7	November 8	Phoenix	L 90–102	Gilbert Arenas & Andray Blatche (20)	Brendan Haywood (10)	Gilbert Arenas (6)	Verizon Center; 14,143	2–5
8	November 10	@ Miami	L 76–90	Gilbert Arenas (21)	Brendan Haywood (11)	Gilbert Arenas (8)	American Airlines Arena; 15,054	2–6
9	November 14	Detroit	L 103–106	Mike Miller, Earl Boykins (20)	Andray Blatche (11)	Gilbert Arenas (10)	Verizon Center; 20,173	2–7
10	November 18	Cleveland	W 108–91	Antawn Jamison (31)	Brendan Haywood (13)	Gilbert Arenas (8)	Verizon Center; 20,173	3–7
11	November 20	@ Oklahoma City	L 108–127	Caron Butler (24)	Brendan Haywood (16)	Gilbert Arenas (8)	Ford Center; 18,203	3–8
12	November 21	@ San Antonio	L 84–106	Gilbert Arenas (18)	Brendan Haywood (8)	Earl Boykins (4)	AT&T Center; 16,888	3–9
13	November 24	Philadelphia	W 108–107	Antawn Jamison (32)	Antawn Jamison (14)	Gilbert Arenas (8)	Verizon Center; 14,485	4–9
14	November 27	@ Miami	W 94–84	Antawn Jamison (24)	Antawn Jamison (13)	Earl Boykins (9)	American Airlines Arena; 17,684	5–9
15	November 28	Charlotte	L 76–92	Caron Butler (19)	Brendan Haywood (9)	Gilbert Arenas (6)	Verizon Center; 17,311	5–10

December: 5–10 (home: 2–4; road: 3–6)

Game	Date	Team	Score	High points	High rebounds	High assists	Location Attendance	Record
16	December 1	@ Toronto	W 106–102	Antawn Jamison (30)	Antawn Jamison (12)	Gilbert Arenas (9)	Air Canada Centre; 15,776	6–10
17	December 2	Milwaukee	W 104–102	Gilbert Arenas (22)	Brendan Haywood (14)	Gilbert Arenas (9)	Verizon Center; 12,272	7–10
18	December 4	Toronto	L 107–109	Gilbert Arenas (34)	Brendan Haywood (16)	Caron Butler & Earl Boykins (5)	Verizon Center; 20,173	7–11
19	December 6	@ Detroit	L 94–98	Caron Butler (20)	Brendan Haywood (11)	Gilbert Arenas (9)	The Palace of Auburn Hills; 14,123	7–12
20	December 10	Boston	L 102–104	Gilbert Arenas (25)	Brendan Haywood, Caron Butler & Antawn Jamison (8)	Gilbert Arenas (8)	Verizon Center; 20,173	7–13
21	December 12	Indiana	L 113–114	Antawn Jamison (31)	Gilbert Arenas (10)	Gilbert Arenas (11)	Verizon Center; 13,172	7–14
22	December 14	@ L.A. Clippers	L 95–97	Antawn Jamison (32)	Brendan Haywood (12)	Gilbert Arenas (9)	Staples Center; 14,511	7–15
23	December 16	@ Sacramento	L 109–112	Gilbert Arenas (33)	Brendan Haywood (14)	Gilbert Arenas (6)	ARCO Arena; 16,579	7–16
24	December 18	@ Golden State	W 118–109	Gilbert Arenas (45)	Brendan Haywood (12)	Gilbert Arenas (13)	Oracle Arena; 17,423	8–16
25	December 19	@ Phoenix	L 95–121	Gilbert Arenas (22)	Andray Blatche (9)	Randy Foye (4)	US Airways Center; 16,811	8–17
26	December 22	Philadelphia	W 105–98	Gilbert Arenas (31)	Gilbert Arenas (8)	Caron Butler (4)	Verizon Center; 15,435	9–17
27	December 23	@ Milwaukee	W 109–97	Antawn Jamison (25)	Caron Butler, Antawn Jamison (10)	Gilbert Arenas (9)	Bradley Center; 13,113	10–17
28	December 26	@ Minnesota	L 89–101	Gilbert Arenas (26)	Brendan Haywood (10)	Gilbert Arenas (9)	Target Center; 16,838	10–18
29	December 28	@ Memphis	L 111–116	Gilbert Arenas (30)	Antawn Jamison (13)	Earl Boykins (6)	FedExForum; 14,571	10–19
30	December 29	Oklahoma City	L 98–110	Antawn Jamison (28)	Andray Blatche (9)	Gilbert Arenas (8)	Verizon Center; 17,152	10–20

January: 6–10 (home: 4–7; road: 2–3)

Game	Date	Team	Score	High points	High rebounds	High assists	Location Attendance	Record
31	January 2	San Antonio	L 86–97	Caron Butler (24)	Antawn Jamison, Brendan Haywood (9)	Gilbert Arenas (8)	Verizon Center; 19,025	10–21
32	January 5	@ Philadelphia	W 104–97	Antawn Jamison (32)	Antawn Jamison (14)	Gilbert Arenas (14)	Wachovia Center; 11,822	11–21
33	January 6	@ Cleveland	L 98–121	Antawn Jamison (26)	Brendan Haywood (7)	Earl Boykins (6)	Quicken Loans Arena; 20,562	11–22
34	January 8	Orlando	W 104–97	Antawn Jamison (28)	Brendan Haywood (15)	Randy Foye, Mike Miller (6)	Verizon Center; 20,173	12–22
35	January 10	New Orleans	L 110–115	Antawn Jamison (32)	Brendan Haywood (14)	Randy Foye (8)	Verizon Center; 14,753	12–23
36	January 12	Detroit	L 90–99	Antawn Jamison (31)	Brendan Haywood (15)	Randy Foye (10)	Verizon Center; 13,544	12–24
37	January 13	@ Atlanta	L 82–94	Antawn Jamison (25)	Antawn Jamison (19)	Randy Foye (8)	Philips Arena; 9,695	12–25
38	January 15	@ Chicago	L 119–121 OT	Antawn Jamison (34)	Brendan Haywood (20)	Randy Foye (7)	United Center; 20,304	12–26
39	January 16	Sacramento	W 96–86	Caron Butler (19)	Brendan Haywood (10)	Randy Foye (6)	Verizon Center; 17,242	13–26
40	January 18	Portland	W 97–92	Antawn Jamison (28)	Caron Butler (9)	Randy Foye (5)	Verizon Center; 12,209	14–26
41	January 20	Dallas	L 93–94	Randy Foye (26)	Brendan Haywood (18)	Mike Miller (4)	Verizon Center; 13,947	14–27
42	January 22	Miami	L 88–112	Andray Blatche (19)	Andray Blatche (11)	Earl Boykins (5)	Verizon Center; 20,173	14–28
43	January 24	L.A. Clippers	L 78–92	Antawn Jamison (20)	Brendan Haywood (12)	Caron Butler (4)	Verizon Center; 12,356	14–29
44	January 26	L.A. Lakers	L 103–115	Antawn Jamison (27)	Antawn Jamison (9)	Miller, Boykins & Foye (4)	Verizon Center; 20,173	14–30
45	January 29	@New Jersey	W 81–79	Earl Boykins (15)	Mike Miller (12)	Foye, Jamison & Stevenson (2)	Izod Center; 11,384	15–30
46	January 30	New York	W 106–96	Mike Miller (25)	Jamison (23)	Mike Miller (8)	Verizon Center; 16,233	16–30

February: 5–6 (home: 3–3; road: 2–3)

Game	Date	Team	Score	High points	High rebounds	High assists	Location Attendance	Record
47	February 1	Boston	L 88–99	Caron Butler (20)	Caron Butler (11)	Randy Foye (4)	Verizon Center; 20,173	16–31
48	February 3	@ New York	L 85–107	Foye & Young (15)	Brendan Haywood (8)	Earl Boykins (6)	Madison Square Garden; 19,225	16–32
49	February 5	@ Orlando	W 92–91	Caron Butler (31)	Brendan Haywood (10)	Randy Foye (7)	Amway Arena; 17,461	17–32
50	February 9	@ Charlotte	L 92–94	Caron Butler (23)	Brendan Haywood (11)	Caron Butler (8)	Time Warner Cable Arena; 12,376	17–33
51	February 17	Minnesota	W 108–99	Andray Blatche (33)	Andray Blatche (13)	Earl Boykins (8)	Verizon Center; 13,143	18–33
52	February 19	Denver	W 107–97	Al Thornton (21)	Andray Blatche (11)	Mike Miller (7)	Verizon Center; 17,212	19–33
53	February 20	@ Toronto	L 104–109	Andray Blatche (24)	Miller & Howard (7)	Earl Boykins (6)	Air Canada Centre; 19,149	19–34
54	February 22	Chicago	W 101–95	Andray Blatche (25)	James Singleton (12)	Randy Foye (9)	Verizon Center; 14,113	20–34
55	February 24	Memphis	L 94–99	Andray Blatche (24)	Al Thornton (11)	Foye & Miller (7)	Verizon Center; 11,875	20–35
56	February 26	New York	L 116–118 OT	Andray Blatche (26)	Andray Blatche (18)	Randy Foye (10)	Verizon Center; 17,408	20–36
57	February 28	@ New Jersey	W 89–85	Andray Blatche (36)	Andray Blatche (15)	Mike Miller (6)	Izod Center; 11,844	21–36

March: 1–16 (home: 0–6; road: 1–10)

Game	Date	Team	Score	High points	High rebounds	High assists	Location Attendance	Record
58	March 3	@ Milwaukee	L 87–100	Blatche & Foye (18)	Andray Blatche (9)	Randy Foye (5)	Bradley Center; 13,247	21–37
59	March 5	Milwaukee	L 74–102	McGee & Blatche (13)	JaVale McGee (11)	Andray Blatche (3)	Verizon Center; 16,963	21–38
60	March 7	@ Boston	L 83–86	Al Thornton (24)	Al Thornton (11)	Randy Foye (8)	TD Garden; 18,624	21–39
61	March 9	Houston	L 88–96	Young & Blatche (18)	Al Thornton (9)	Livingston & Miller (5)	Verizon Center; 16,963	21–40
63	March 11	Atlanta	L 99–105	Andray Blatche (30)	Andray Blatche (10)	Mike Miller (7)	Verizon Center; 13,625	21–41
63	March 12	@ Detroit	L 87–101	Andray Blatche (23)	Andray Blatche (10)	Randy Foye (8)	The Palace of Auburn Hills; 20,273	21–42
64	March 13	Orlando	L 95–109	Andray Blatche (32)	Alonzo Gee (5)	Shaun Livingston (8)	Verizon Center; 20,173	21–43
65	March 15	@ Utah	L 89–112	Andray Blatche (24)	Singleton & Miller (10)	Randy Foye (5)	EnergySolutions Arena; 19,611	21–44
66	March 16	@ Denver	L 87–97	Andray Blatche (23)	Alonzo Gee (10)	Shaun Livingston (6)	Pepsi Center; 17,447	21–45
67	March 19	@ Portland	L 74–76	Mike Miller (16)	James Singleton (16)	Shaun Livingston (4)	Rose Garden; 20,592	21–46
68	March 21	@ L.A. Lakers	L 92–99	Nick Young (22)	Andray Blatche (12)	Shaun Livingston (6)	Staples Center; 18,997	21–47
69	March 23	Charlotte	L 86–95 OT	Mike Miller (15)	JaVale McGee (12)	Shaun Livingston (6)	Verizon Center; 12,742	21–48
70	March 24	@ Indiana	L 82–99	Andray Blatche (21)	James Singleton (21)	Earl Boykins (3)	Conseco Fieldhouse; 12,504	21–49
71	March 26	@ Charlotte	L 96–107	Alonzo Gee (19)	Singleton & Miller (7)	Mike Miller (8)	Time Warner Cable Arena; 16,365	21–50
72	March 27	Utah	L 87–103	Andray Blatche (20)	James Singleton (12)	Andray Blatche (7)	Verizon Center; 15,312	21–51
73	March 30	@ Houston	L 94–98	Andray Blatche (31)	Mike Miller (12)	Mike Miller (4)	Toyota Center; 14,395	21–52
74	March 31	@ New Orleans	W 96–91	Mike Miller (27)	Mike Miller (7)	Shaun Livingston (6)	New Orleans Arena; 14,634	22–52

April: 4–4 (home: 3–2; road: 1–2)

Game	Date	Team	Score	High points	High rebounds	High assists	Location Attendance	Record
75	April 2	Chicago	L 87–95	Andray Blatche (18)	Andray Blatche (13)	Blatche & Miller (7)	Verizon Center; 18,002	22–53
76	April 4	New Jersey	W 109–99	Andray Blatche (20)	Mike Miller (13)	Andray Blatche (13)	Verizon Center; 10,112	23–53
77	April 6	Golden State	W 112–94	Nick Young (29)	JaVale McGee (15)	Livingston & Miller (8)	Verizon Center; 14,721	24–53
78	April 7	@ Orlando	L 94–121	Nick Young (21)	Mike Miller (9)	Mike Miller (5)	Amway Arena; 17,461	24–54
79	April 9	@ Boston	W 106–96	Andray Blatche (31)	Blatche & McGee (11)	Livingston & Miller (7)	TD Garden; 18,624	25–54
80	April 10	Atlanta	L 95–105	Andray Blatche (24)	JaVale McGee (10)	Blatche & Livingston (7)	Verizon Center; 20,173	25–55
81	April 12	@ New York	L 103–114	Mike Miller (23)	Andray Blatche (10)	Blatche & Livingston (7)	Madison Square Garden; 19,763	25–56
82	April 14	Indiana	W 98–97	Andray Blatche (26)	James Singleton (17)	Shaun Livingston (7)	Verizon Center; 16,126	26–56

2009–10 season schedule

== Player statistics ==
=== Season ===
Player	GP	GS	MPG	FG%	3P%	FT%	RPG	APG	SPG	BPG	PPG
Gilbert Arenas	32	32	36.5	41.1	34.8	73.9	4.2	7.2	1.2	0.2	22.6
Antawn Jamison	41	41	38.9	45.0	34.5	70.0	8.8	1.3	1.0	0.2	20.5
Caron Butler	47	47	39.4	42.2	26.3	87.7	6.7	2.3	1.4	0.3	16.9
Josh Howard	4	3	22.8	43.5	27.3	75.0	3.3	1.0	0.7	0.5	14.5
Andray Blatche	81	36	27.9	47.8	29.5	74.4	6.3	2.1	1.0	0.8	14.1
Mike Miller	54	50	33.4	50.1	48.0	82.4	6.2	3.9	0.7	0.2	10.9
Al Thornton	24	16	28.1	46.3	35.3	69.4	4.3	1.2	0.8	0.5	10.7
Randy Foye	70	38	23.8	41.4	34.6	89.0	1.9	3.3	0.4	0.1	10.1
Brendan Haywood	49	48	32.9	56.1	0.0	64.6	10.3	0.4	0.3	2.0	9.8
Shaun Livingston	26	18	25.6	53.5	0.0	87.5	2.2	4.4	0.4	0.3	9.2
Nick Young	74	23	19.2	41.8	40.6	80.0	1.4	0.6	0.3	0.1	8.6
Alonzo Gee	11	2	16.5	48.3	77.8	62.1	2.9	0.6	0.6	0.1	7.4
Earl Boykins	67	1	16.7	42.7	31.7	86.5	1.1	2.6	0.3	0.0	6.6
JaVale McGee	60	19	16.1	50.8	0.0	63.8	4.1	0.2	0.2	1.6	6.4
Cartier Martin	8	0	14.3	37.5	38.9	88.9	2.6	0.9	0.3	0.1	6.4
James Singleton	32	3	23.9	38.4	13.3	83.9	6.9	0.7	0.5	1.1	6.1
Mike James	4	0	11.5	30.0	33.3	50.0	0.8	1.3	0.7	0.0	4.5
Cedric Jackson	4	0	9.8	36.4	33.3	75.0	0.8	1.5	0.0	0.0	3.0
Paul Davis	2	0	4.0	50.0	0.0	50.0	0.0	1.5	0.0	0.5	2.5
DeShawn Stevenson	40	13	12.1	28.2	17.7	72.0	1.6	1.1	0.2	0.1	2.2
Quinton Ross	25	0	10.4	30.9	12.5	50.0	0.9	0.2	0.2	0.0	1.5
Fabricio Oberto	57	20	11.4	62.5	0.0	76.5	1.8	0.9	0.1	0.1	1.5
Mike Harris	5	0	2.8	33.3	0.0	100.0	0.8	0.0	0.2	0.0	0.8
Dominic McGuire	41	0	5.9	37.5	0.0	0.0	1.5	0.2	0.1	0.0	0.7

== Injuries and surgeries ==
- Forward Antawn Jamison missed the first 9 games due to a shoulder injury.
- Forward Mike Miller missed 28 games due to various injuries.
- Forward Josh Howard played in only 4 games before tearing his ACL and missed the rest of the season.
- Guard Randy Foye missed the last 11 games of the season after it was found he required wrist surgery.

== Transactions ==
=== Trades ===
Date	Details
February 13, 2010	To Dallas Mavericks Caron Butler; Brendan Haywood; DeShawn Stevenson	To Washington Wizards Josh Howard; Drew Gooden; James Singleton; Quinton Ross
February 18, 2010	To Cleveland Cavaliers Antawn Jamison	To Washington Wizards Zydrunas Ilgauskas; Emir Preldžić; 2010 NBA draft 1st round pick
February 18, 2010	To Los Angeles Clippers Drew Gooden	To Washington Wizards Al Thornton
February 18, 2010	To Sacramento Kings Dominic McGuire	To Washington Wizards Future considerations

=== Free agents ===
==== Additions ====
- Signed guard Earl Boykins on November 11, 2009
- Signed forward Mike Harris on February 24, 2010
- Signed guard Shaun Livingston on February 26, 2010
- Signed guard Alonzo Gee on March 7, 2010
- Signed guard Cartier Martin on March 30, 2010
- Signed guard Cedric Jackson on March 31, 2010

==== Subtractions ====
- Waived guard Vincent Grier on October 22, 2009
- Waived forward Paul Davis on November 11, 2009
- Waived center Zydrunas Ilgauskas on February 25, 2010
- Waived guard Mike James on March 1, 2010
