= 2010–11 Washington Wizards season =

NBA professional basketball team season

- Head coach: Flip Saunders
- Owners: Ted Leonsis
- Arena: Verizon Center

Results
- Record: 23–59 (.280)
- Place: Division: 5th (Southeast); Conference: 13th (Eastern)
- Playoff finish: Did not qualify
- Stats at Basketball Reference

Local media
- Television: CSN Mid-Atlantic, The CW Washington, TBD TV
- Radio: 106.7 The Fan

The 2010–11 Washington Wizards season is the 50th season of the Washington Wizards franchise in the National Basketball Association (NBA), the 38th in the Washington, D.C. area. This was also the last season the Wizards's color scheme was Blue and gold. Also, their DC logo was changed to include a mashup with the Bullets's "Hands" logo.

== Key dates ==
- June 24 - The 2010 NBA draft was held in New York City.
- July 1 - The free agency period begun.

== Summary ==
=== NBA Draft 2010 ===
Round	Pick	Player	Position	Nationality	College
1	1	John Wall	Point guard	United States	Kentucky
1	17	Kevin Seraphin (acquired from Chicago)	Power forward	France	Cholet Basket
1	23	Trevor Booker (acquired from Minnesota)	Power forward	United States	Clemson
1	30	Lazar Hayward (traded to Minnesota)	Small forward	United States	Marquette
2	35	Nemanja Bjelica (traded to Minnesota)	Small forward	Serbia	Red Star Belgrade
2	56	Hamady N'Diaye (acquired from Minnesota)	Center	Senegal	Rutgers

== Roster ==
2010-11 Washington Wizards roster
Players

Pos.	No.	Player	Height	Weight	DOB	From
F/C	7	Andray Blatche	6 ft 11 in (2.11 m)	260 lb (118 kg)		South Kent School (CT)
F	35	Trevor Booker	6 ft 8 in (2.03 m)	240 lb (109 kg)		Clemson
G	15	Jordan Crawford	6 ft 4 in (1.93 m)	195 lb (88 kg)		Xavier
F	6	Maurice Evans	6 ft 5 in (1.96 m)	220 lb (100 kg)		Texas
G/F	5	Josh Howard	6 ft 7 in (2.01 m)	210 lb (95 kg)		Wake Forest
G/F	12	Othyus Jeffers	6 ft 5 in (1.96 m)	210 lb (95 kg)		Robert Morris (IL)
F	9	Rashard Lewis	6 ft 10 in (2.08 m)	230 lb (104 kg)		Alief Elsik HS (TX)
C	34	JaVale McGee	7 ft 0 in (2.13 m)	252 lb (114 kg)		Nevada
C	55	Hamady N'Diaye	7 ft 0 in (2.13 m)	235 lb (107 kg)		Rutgers
G/F	32	Larry Owens	6 ft 7 in (2.01 m)	210 lb (95 kg)		Oral Roberts
F	13	Kevin Seraphin	6 ft 9 in (2.06 m)	275 lb (125 kg)		France
G	22	Mustafa Shakur	6 ft 4 in (1.93 m)	195 lb (88 kg)		Arizona
G	2	John Wall	6 ft 4 in (1.93 m)	195 lb (88 kg)		Kentucky
F/C	31	Yi Jianlian	7 ft 0 in (2.13 m)	250 lb (113 kg)		China
G/F	1	Nick Young	6 ft 7 in (2.01 m)	210 lb (95 kg)		USC

Coaches
Head coach
- Flip Saunders (Minnesota)
Assistant(s)
- Randy Wittman (Indiana)
- Don Zierden (Mount Senario)
- Sam Cassell (Florida State)
- Wes Unseld, Jr. (Johns Hopkins)
- Ryan Saunders (Minnesota)
- Mike Wells (Mount Vernon Nazarene)
- Gene Banks (Duke)

Legend
- (DP) Unsigned draft pick
- (FA) Free agent
- (S) Suspended
- Injured

== Pre-season ==
=== Game log ===
2010 pre-season game log
Pre-season: 3–4 (home: 1–1; road: 2–3)

Game	Date	Team	Score	High points	High rebounds	High assists	Location Attendance	Record
1	October 5	@ Dallas	W 97–94	Andray Blatche (22)	Yi Jianlian (10)	John Wall (9)	American Airlines Center; 15,546	1–0
2	October 7	@ Cleveland	W 97–83	Yi Jianlian (16)	Yi Jianlian, Andray Blatche (7)	John Wall (9)	Quicken Loans Arena; 19,124	2–0
3	October 8	@ Chicago	L 96–107	Nick Young (18)	JaVale McGee (5)	John Wall (6)	United Center; 20,898	2–1
4	October 12	Atlanta	W 107–92	Nick Young (24)	JaVale McGee (11)	Kirk Hinrich (8)	Verizon Center; 9,230	3–1
5	October 14	Milwaukee	L 88–96	Andray Blatche (17)	Andray Blatche (9)	John Wall (11)	Verizon Center; 9,263	3–2
6	October 17	@ New York	W 92–90	John Wall (19)	Kirk Hinrich (9)	John Wall (6)	Madison Square Garden; 18,792	3–3
7	October 19	@ Detroit	L 92–98	Andray Blatche, Kirk Hinrich (17)	Trevor Booker (12)	John Wall (7)	Huntington Center; 6,424	3–4

2010–11 season schedule

== Regular season ==
=== Standings ===
Southeast Division	W	L	PCT	GB	Home	Road	Div
y-Miami Heat	58	24	.707	–	30–11	28–13	13–3
x-Orlando Magic	52	30	.634	6	29–12	23–18	11–5
x-Atlanta Hawks	44	38	.537	14	24–17	20–21	9–7
Charlotte Bobcats	34	48	.415	24	21–20	13–28	4–12
Washington Wizards	23	59	.280	35	20–21	3–38	3–13

#	Eastern Conference				
#	Team	W	L	PCT	GB
1	z-Chicago Bulls	62	20	.756	–
2	y-Miami Heat	58	24	.707	4
3	y-Boston Celtics	56	26	.683	6
4	x-Orlando Magic	52	30	.634	10
5	x-Atlanta Hawks	44	38	.537	18
6	x-New York Knicks	42	40	.512	20
7	x-Philadelphia 76ers	41	41	.500	21
8	x-Indiana Pacers	37	45	.451	25
9	Milwaukee Bucks	35	47	.427	27
10	Charlotte Bobcats	34	48	.415	28
11	Detroit Pistons	30	52	.366	32
12	New Jersey Nets	24	58	.293	38
13	Washington Wizards	23	59	.280	39
14	Toronto Raptors	22	60	.268	40
15	Cleveland Cavaliers	19	63	.232	43

=== Game log ===
2010–11 game log
Total: 23–59 (Home: 20–21; Road: 3–38)
October: 0–2 (home: 0–0; road: 0–2)

Game	Date	Team	Score	High points	High rebounds	High assists	Location Attendance	Record
1	October 28	@ Orlando	L 83–112	Cartier Martin (17)	Al Thornton (7)	John Wall (9)	Amway Center; 18,918	0–1
2	October 30	@ Atlanta	L 95–99	John Wall (28)	JaVale McGee (8)	John Wall (9)	Philips Arena; 18,729	0–2

November: 5–9 (home: 5–3; road: 0–6)

Game	Date	Team	Score	High points	High rebounds	High assists	Location Attendance	Record
3	November 2	Philadelphia	W 116–115 (OT)	John Wall (29)	Andray Blatche (8)	John Wall (13)	Verizon Center; 17,803	1–2
4	November 5	@ New York	L 91–112	Andray Blatche (22)	JaVale McGee (8)	John Wall (7)	Madison Square Garden; 19,763	1–3
5	November 6	Cleveland	L 102–107	Al Thornton (23)	Andray Blatche (15)	John Wall (10)	Verizon Center; 14,442	1–4
6	November 10	Houston	W 98–91	Andray Blatche, Al Thornton (20)	Andray Blatche (11)	John Wall (13)	Verizon Center; 13,665	2–4
7	November 12	Charlotte	L 85–93	Andray Blatche (22)	Andray Blatche (9)	John Wall (11)	Verizon Center; 14,855	2–5
8	November 13	@ Chicago	L 96–103	Gilbert Arenas (30)	Hilton Armstrong (10)	Kirk Hinrich, John Wall (6)	United Center; 21,610	2–6
9	November 16	Toronto	W 109–94	Andray Blatche (22)	JaVale McGee (9)	Kirk Hinrich (12)	Verizon Center; 11,513	3–6
10	November 17	@ Boston	L 83–114	Nick Young (20)	JaVale McGee (10)	Kirk Hinrich (5)	TD Garden; 18,624	3–7
11	November 19	Memphis	W 89–86	Gilbert Arenas (24)	JaVale McGee (12)	Kirk Hinrich (6)	Verizon Center; 13,504	4–7
12	November 21	@ Detroit	L 110–115 (OT)	Andray Blatche, JaVale McGee (20)	JaVale McGee (16)	Gilbert Arenas (16)	The Palace of Auburn Hills; 13,241	4–8
13	November 23	Philadelphia	W 116–114 (OT)	John Wall (25)	JaVale McGee (18)	Gilbert Arenas (7)	Verizon Center; 16,197	5–8
14	November 25	@ Atlanta	L 96–116	Gilbert Arenas (21)	JaVale McGee (10)	Gilbert Arenas (8)	Philips Arena; 15,042	5–9
15	November 27	Orlando	L 99–100	Gilbert Arenas (31)	Andray Blatche (13)	Gilbert Arenas (5)	Verizon Center; 16,435	5–10
16	November 29	@ Miami	L 94–105	Andray Blatche (26)	JaVale McGee (10)	Gilbert Arenas (7)	American Airlines Arena; 19,600	5–11

December: 3–12 (home: 3–4; road: 0–8)

Game	Date	Team	Score	High points	High rebounds	High assists	Location Attendance	Record
17	December 1	@ Toronto	L 108–127	JaVale McGee (21)	JaVale McGee (7)	John Wall (8)	Air Canada Centre; 15,209	5–12
18	December 3	Portland	W 83–79	Andray Blatche (19)	JaVale McGee (10)	Gilbert Arenas (6)	Verizon Center; 13,408	6–12
19	December 5	@ Phoenix	L 108–125	Andray Blatche (24)	Yi Jianlian (9)	John Wall (12)	US Airways Center; 17,430	6–13
20	December 7	@ L.A. Lakers	L 108–115	Nick Young (30)	JaVale McGee (6)	John Wall (14)	Staples Center; 18,997	6–14
21	December 8	@ Sacramento	L 91–116	Al Thornton (20)	JaVale McGee (9)	Gilbert Arenas (4)	ARCO Arena; 12,308	6–15
22	December 10	New York	L 95–101	Gilbert Arenas (20)	JaVale McGee (10)	Gilbert Arenas, John Wall (6)	Verizon Center; 18,542	6–16
23	December 14	L.A. Lakers	L 89–103	Nick Young (21)	Trevor Booker, JaVale McGee, Kevin Seraphin (9)	Gilbert Arenas (10)	Verizon Center; 16,513	6–17
24	December 16	@ New Jersey	L 89–97	Nick Young (22)	Trevor Booker (9)	Gilbert Arenas (9)	Prudential Center; 10,764	6–18
25	December 18	Miami	L 94–95	Nick Young (30)	Andray Blatche (12)	Kirk Hinrich (12)	Verizon Center; 20,278	6–19
26	December 20	Charlotte	W 108–75	Nick Young (21)	Kirk Hinrich (6)	Kirk Hinrich (11)	Verizon Center; 13,825	7–19
27	December 22	Chicago	L 80–87	Nick Young (22)	JaVale McGee (10)	Kirk Hinrich (9)	Verizon Center; 18,011	7–20
28	December 26	@ San Antonio	L 80–94	Rashard Lewis (21)	Hilton Armstrong (13)	Kirk Hinrich (7)	AT&T Center; 18,581	7–21
29	December 27	@ Houston	L 93–100	Kirk Hinrich (19)	Andray Blatche (14)	John Wall (6)	Toyota Center; 18,143	7–22
30	December 29	Indiana	W 104–90	Nick Young (25)	Andray Blatche (11)	John Wall (12)	Verizon Center; 16,108	8–22
31	December 31	@ Indiana	L 86–95	John Wall (25)	Andray Blatche (12)	Rashard Lewis (5)	Conseco Fieldhouse; 13,043	8–23

January: 5–11 (home: 5–3; road: 0–8)

Game	Date	Team	Score	High points	High rebounds	High assists	Location Attendance	Record
32	January 1	New Orleans	L 81–92	Nick Young (24)	JaVale McGee (13)	John Wall (10)	Verizon Center; 16,026	8–24
33	January 5	@ Philadelphia	L 97–109	Nick Young (21)	Rashard Lewis (10)	John Wall (14)	Wells Fargo Center; 12,434	8–25
34	January 7	New Jersey	W 97–77	Rashard Lewis, Nick Young (16)	Rashard Lewis (13)	John Wall (9)	Verizon Center; 16,017	9–25
35	January 8	@ Charlotte	L 89–104	Kirk Hinrich (18)	Andray Blatche (8)	John Wall (11)	Time Warner Cable Arena; 16,038	9–26
36	January 11	Sacramento	W 136–133 (OT)	Nick Young (43)	Andray Blatche (13)	John Wall (9)	Verizon Center; 16,226	10–26
37	January 13	@ Minnesota	L 97–109	Rashard Lewis (19)	Yi Jianlian (8)	John Wall (10)	Target Center; 11,437	10–27
38	January 15	Toronto	W 98–95	Nick Young (29)	Andray Blatche (13)	John Wall (9)	Verizon Center; 14,652	11–27
39	January 17	Utah	W 108–101	Nick Young (25)	Andray Blatche, JaVale McGee (11)	John Wall (15)	Verizon Center; 14,925	12–27
40	January 19	@ Milwaukee	L 87–100	Andray Blatche (23)	Andray Blatche (7)	John Wall (13)	Bradley Center; 14,007	12–28
41	January 21	Phoenix	L 91–109	Nick Young (25)	Rashard Lewis (12)	John Wall (14)	Verizon Center; 15,716	12–29
42	January 22	Boston	W 85–83	Rashard Lewis (18)	Rashard Lewis (11)	Mustafa Shakur (5)	Verizon Center; 20,278	13–29
43	January 24	@ New York	L 106–115	Nick Young (22)	JaVale McGee (10)	John Wall (9)	Madison Square Garden; 19,763	13–30
44	January 25	Denver	L 109–120	Nick Young (26)	Andray Blatche (9)	John Wall (13)	Verizon Center; 16,121	13–31
45	January 28	@ Oklahoma City	L 117–124 (2OT)	Nick Young (32)	Trevor Booker (12)	John Wall (10)	Oklahoma City Arena; 18,203	13–32
46	January 29	@ Memphis	L 93–107	John Wall (14)	Trevor Booker (12)	John Wall (8)	FedExForum; 14,722	13–33
47	January 31	@ Dallas	L 92–102	Rashard Lewis, Nick Young (18)	Andray Blatche (13)	John Wall (10)	American Airlines Center; 19,724	13–34

February: 2–10 (home: 1–6; road: 1–4)

Game	Date	Team	Score	High points	High rebounds	High assists	Location Attendance	Record
48	February 1	@ New Orleans	L 89–97	Nick Young (30)	Andray Blatche (9)	John Wall (7)	New Orleans Arena; 13,921	13–35
49	February 4	Orlando	L 92–110	Kirk Hinrich, Nick Young (17)	Rashard Lewis (8)	Andray Blatche (6)	Verizon Center; 18,940	13–36
50	February 5	Atlanta	L 92–99	Nick Young (21)	Andray Blatche, John Wall (6)	John Wall (6)	Verizon Center; 16,256	13–37
51	February 9	Milwaukee	W 100–85	Nick Young (26)	JaVale McGee (17)	John Wall (6)	Verizon Center; 16,108	14–37
52	February 12	San Antonio	L 94–118	Andray Blatche; Cartier Martin (16)	Andray Blatche (9)	John Wall (7)	Verizon Center; 20,435	14–38
53	February 13	@ Cleveland	W 115–100	Nick Young (31)	Andray Blatche (9)	John Wall (14)	Quicken Loans Arena; 19,154	15–38
54	February 16	@ Orlando	L 76–101	John Wall (27)	Andray Blatche (9)	Kirk Hinrich (3)	Amway Center; 19,054	15–39
All-Star Break
55	February 22	Indiana	L 96–113	Andray Blatche (21)	JaVale McGee, John Wall (8)	John Wall (10)	Verizon Center; 14,328	15–40
56	February 23	@ Philadelphia	L 94–117	Trevor Booker, John Wall (21)	Josh Howard (6)	John Wall (12)	Wells Fargo Center; 12,704	15–41
57	February 25	@ Miami	L 113–121	Nick Young (38)	JaVale McGee (17)	John Wall (12)	American Airlines Arena; 19,825	15–42
58	February 26	Dallas	L 99–105	John Wall (24)	JaVale McGee (11)	John Wall (5)	Verizon Center; 19,203	15–43
59	February 28	Chicago	L 77–105	Andray Blatche (15)	Andray Blatche (11)	John Wall (10)	Verizon Center; 17,873	15–44

March: 3–12 (home: 2–5; road: 1–7)

Game	Date	Team	Score	High points	High rebounds	High assists	Location Attendance	Record
60	March 2	Golden State	L 102–106	Nick Young (31)	Trevor Booker (11)	Andray Blatche, John Wall (6)	Verizon Center; 17,865	15–45
61	March 5	Minnesota	W 103–96	Andray Blatche (20)	John Wall (11)	John Wall (8)	Verizon Center; 18,216	16–45
62	March 6	@ Detroit	L 102–113	John Wall (24)	Andray Blatche (9)	John Wall (7)	The Palace of Auburn Hills; 17,506	16–46
63	March 8	Milwaukee	L 76–95	Jordan Crawford (22)	JaVale McGee (13)	John Wall (7)	Verizon Center; 16,190	16–47
64	March 12	L.A. Clippers	L 101–122	John Wall (25)	JaVale McGee (8)	John Wall (8)	Verizon Center; 20,278	16–48
65	March 14	Oklahoma City	L 89–116	Trevor Booker, JaVale McGee, John Wall (14)	Trevor Booker (13)	Jordan Crawford, John Wall (5)	Verizon Center; 17,921	16–49
66	March 15	@ Chicago	L 79–98	Jordan Crawford (27)	JaVale McGee (12)	John Wall (7)	United Center; 22,103	16–50
67	March 18	@ Toronto	L 107–116	Trevor Booker (26)	Trevor Booker (13)	John Wall (7)	Air Canada Centre; 18,017	16–51
68	March 20	New Jersey	W 98–92	John Wall (26)	Trevor Booker (8)	John Wall (8)	Verizon Center; 17,761	17–51
69	March 22	@ Portland	L 76–111	Jordan Crawford (12)	JaVale McGee (7)	John Wall (7)	Rose Garden; 20,624	17–52
70	March 23	@ L.A. Clippers	L 119–127 (2OT)	John Wall (32)	JaVale McGee (13)	Jordan Crawford, John Wall (10)	Staples Center; 19,060	17–53
71	March 25	@ Denver	L 94–114	Jordan Crawford (19)	JaVale McGee (13)	John Wall (6)	Pepsi Center; 19,308	17–54
72	March 27	@ Golden State	L 104–114	JaVale McGee (28)	JaVale McGee (18)	John Wall (12)	Oracle Arena; 17,723	17–55
73	March 28	@ Utah	W 100–95 (OT)	John Wall (28)	JaVale McGee (17)	John Wall (7)	EnergySolutions Arena; 19,724	18–55
74	March 30	Miami	L 107–123	Jordan Crawford (39)	Andray Blatche, Othyus Jeffers (8)	John Wall (5)	Verizon Center; 18,916	18–56

April: 5–3 (home: 4–0; road: 1–3)

Game	Date	Team	Score	High points	High rebounds	High assists	Location Attendance	Record
75	April 1	Cleveland	W 115–107	Andray Blatche (36)	Andray Blatche (19)	Jordan Crawford (11)	Verizon Center; 17,427	19–56
76	April 3	@ Charlotte	W 97–91	Andray Blatche (25)	Andray Blatche (17)	John Wall (5)	Time Warner Cable Arena; 16,444	20–56
77	April 5	Detroit	W 107–105	Andray Blatche, John Wall (26)	Andray Blatche (10)	John Wall (12)	Verizon Center; 18,131	21–56
78	April 6	@ Indiana	L 112–136	Jordan Crawford (29)	Andray Blatche (10)	John Wall (4)	Conseco Fieldhouse; 14,222	21–57
79	April 8	@ Boston	L 88–104	Andray Blatche, John Wall (20)	Andray Blatche, JaVale McGee (10)	John Wall (7)	TD Garden; 18,624	21–58
80	April 9	Atlanta	W 115–83	Andray Blatche (23)	Othyus Jeffers (11)	Jordan Crawford (8)	Verizon Center; 19,771	22–58
81	April 11	Boston	W 95–94 (OT)	John Wall (24)	Yi Jianlian (10)	Jordan Crawford (6)	Verizon Center; 17,787	23–58
82	April 13	@ Cleveland	L 93–100	Andray Blatche (20)	Yi Jianlian (12)	Jordan Crawford (6)	Quicken Loans Arena; 20,562	23–59

2010–11 season schedule

== Player statistics ==
=== Season ===
Player	GP	GS	MPG	FG%	3P%	FT%	RPG	APG	SPG	BPG	PPG
Nick Young	64	40	31.8	.441	.387	.816	2.7	1.2	0.7	0.3	17.4
Gilbert Arenas	21	14	34.6	.394	.324	.840	3.3	5.6	1.4	0.5	17.3
Andray Blatche	64	63	33.9	.445	.222	.777	8.2	2.3	1.5	0.8	16.8
John Wall	69	64	37.8	.409	.296	.766	4.6	8.3	1.7	0.5	16.4
Jordan Crawford	26	18	33.3	.390	.238	.885	3.0	3.9	1.4	0.1	16.3
Rashard Lewis	32	27	31.7	.446	.347	.843	5.8	2.0	0.9	0.6	11.4
Kirk Hinrich	48	29	30.6	.452	.384	.876	2.7	4.4	1.2	0.2	11.1
JaVale McGee	79	75	27.8	.550	.000	.583	8.0	0.5	0.5	2.4	10.1
Maurice Evans	26	12	27.4	.439	.346	.933	2.8	0.6	0.7	0.3	9.7
Josh Howard	18	10	22.7	.358	.241	.617	4.1	1.3	0.7	0.3	8.4
Al Thornton	49	23	21.8	.471	.160	.757	3.2	1.0	0.6	0.2	8.0
Larry Owens	5	0	22.4	.462	.500	.400	2.2	1.4	1.4	1.0	6.2
Othyus Jeffers	16	1	19.6	.484	.250	.652	4.1	1.2	1.0	0.0	5.7
Yi Jianlian	63	11	17.7	.418	.231	.681	3.9	0.4	0.4	0.5	5.6
Trevor Booker	65	14	16.4	.549	.000	.673	3.9	0.5	0.4	0.6	5.3
Cartier Martin	52	1	10.4	.390	.394	.700	1.4	0.3	0.3	0.1	4.0
Alonzo Gee	11	5	11.5	.444	.000	.667	2.0	0.5	0.6	0.0	2.9
Kevin Seraphin	58	1	10.9	.449	.000	.710	2.6	0.2	0.3	0.5	2.7
Mustafa Shakur	22	0	7.2	.356	.100	.533	1.0	1.1	0.2	0.1	2.3
Hilton Armstrong	41	2	10.0	.484	.333	.609	2.8	0.2	0.4	0.4	1.9
Mike Bibby	2	0	14.5	.111	.000	.000	1.5	4.0	0.5	0.0	1.0
Lester Hudson	11	0	6.6	.250	.267	.500	0.4	1.6	0.4	0.1	1.6
Hamady Ndiaye	16	0	5.0	.800	.000	.500	0.4	0.0	0.1	0.3	0.9

== Awards, records and milestones ==
=== Awards ===
==== Week/Month ====
- On February 1, 2011 John Wall was named Eastern Conference's Rookie of the Month for January.
- On March 1, 2011 John Wall was named Eastern Conference's Rookie of the Month for February.
- On April 1, 2011 John Wall was named Eastern Conference's Rookie of the Month for March.

=== Records ===
- The Wizards became the only NBA team to have two rookies, John Wall and Jordan Crawford, each record triple-doubles in a single season.

== Transactions ==
=== Trades ===
June 24, 2010
To Minnesota Timberwolves

- No. 30 pick ( (United States) Lazar Hayward),
  No. 35 pick ( (Serbia) Nemanja Bjelica)
To Washington Wizards

- No. 23 pick ( (United States) Trevor Booker),
  No. 56 pick ( (Senegal) Hamady N'Diaye)
June 29, 2010
To New Jersey Nets

- (United States) Quinton Ross
To Washington Wizards

- (China) Yi Jianlian
  cash considerations
July 8, 2010
To Chicago Bulls

- Draft rights to (Belarus) Vladimir Veremeenko
To Washington Wizards

- (United States) Kirk Hinrich
  No. 17 pick ( (France) Kevin Seraphin)
  cash considerations
December 18, 2010
To Orlando Magic

- (United States) Gilbert Arenas
To Washington Wizards

- (United States) Rashard Lewis
February 23, 2011
To Atlanta Hawks

- (United States) Kirk Hinrich
- (United States) Hilton Armstrong
To Washington Wizards

- (United States) Mike Bibby
- (United States) Maurice Evans
- (United States) Jordan Crawford
- 2011 first-round pick

=== Free agents ===
==== Additions ====
Player	Signed	Former Team
Lester Hudson	Free agent	Memphis Grizzlies
Mustafa Shakur	Free agent	Rio Grande Valley Vipers
Othyus Jeffers	Free agent	Iowa Energy
Larry Owens	Free agent	Tulsa 66ers

==== Subtractions ====
Player	Reason Left	New Team(s)
Randy Foye	Free agent	Los Angeles Clippers
Mike Miller	Free agent	Miami Heat
Shaun Livingston	Free agent	Charlotte Bobcats
Lester Hudson	Waived	Guangdong Southern Tigers
Mike Bibby	Contract Buyout	Miami Heat
Al Thornton	Contract Buyout	Golden State Warriors
Cartier Martin	Waived	Jilin Northeast Tigers
Javaris Crittenton	Waived free agent	Charlotte Bobcats / Zhejiang Guangsha Lions / Dakota Wizards
