= Nick Young =

American basketball player (born 1985)

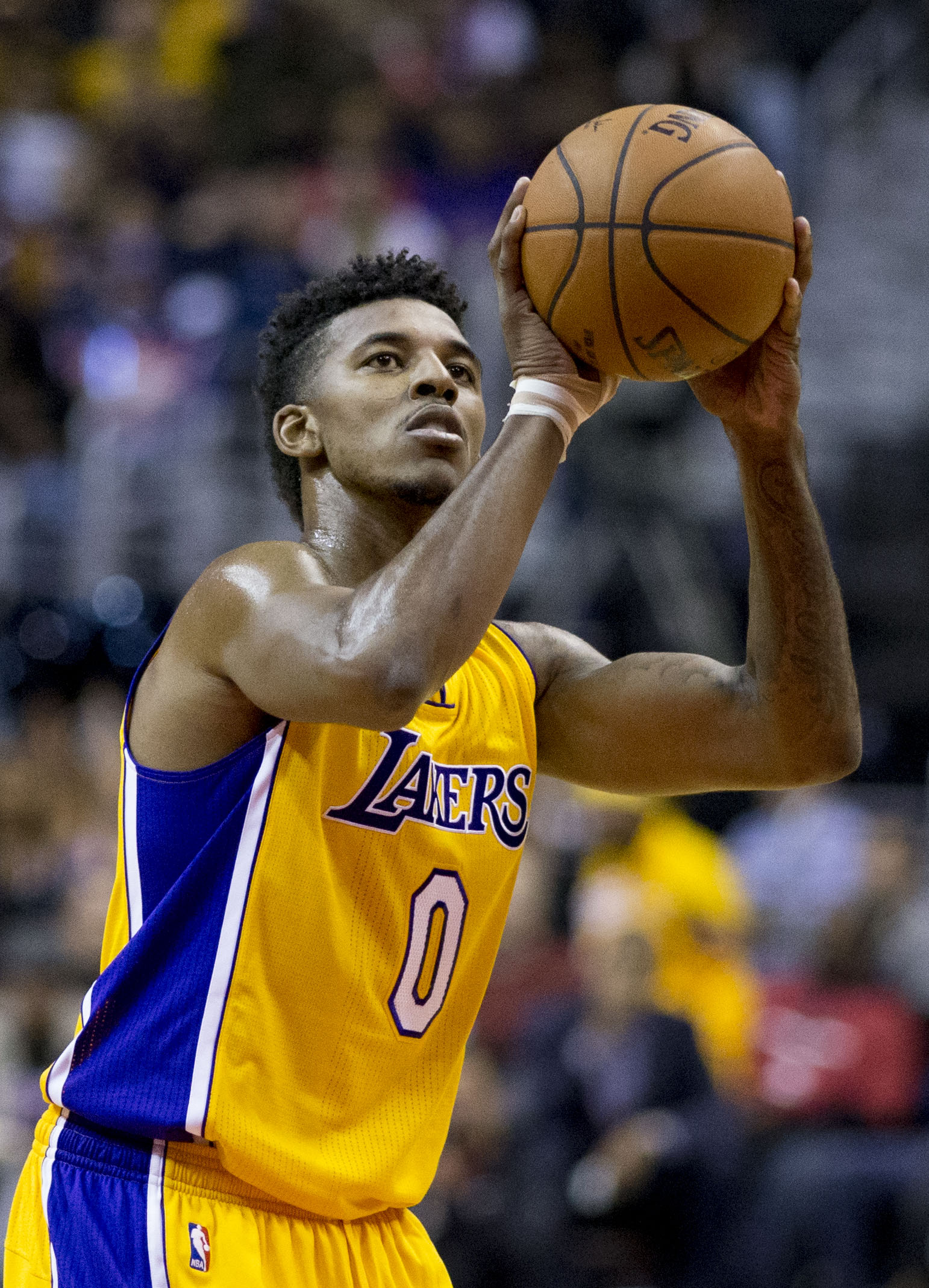
- Young with the Los Angeles Lakers in 2014

Personal information
- Born: June 1, 1985 (age 41) Los Angeles, California, U.S.
- Listed height: 6 ft 7 in (2.01 m)
- Listed weight: 210 lb (95 kg)

Career information
- High school: Grover Cleveland (Los Angeles, California)
- College: USC (2004–2007)
- NBA draft: 2007: 1st round, 16th overall pick
- Drafted by: Washington Wizards
- Playing career: 2007–2018
- Position: Shooting guard
- Number: 1, 11, 0, 6, 34

Career history
- 2007–2012: Washington Wizards
- 2012: Los Angeles Clippers
- 2012–2013: Philadelphia 76ers
- 2013–2017: Los Angeles Lakers
- 2017–2018: Golden State Warriors
- 2018: Denver Nuggets

Career highlights
- NBA champion (2018); 2× First-team All-Pac-10 (2006, 2007)

Career NBA statistics
- Points: 8,194 (11.4 ppg)
- Rebounds: 1,427 (2.0 rpg)
- Assists: 687 (1.0 apg)
- Stats at NBA.com
- Stats at Basketball Reference

Nicholas Aaron Young (born June 1, 1985), nicknamed "Swaggy P", is an American former professional basketball player. He played college basketball for the USC Trojans and was a two-time first-team all-conference selection in the Pac-10. Young was selected by the Washington Wizards in the first round of the 2007 NBA draft with the 16th overall pick. He won an NBA championship with the Golden State Warriors in 2018.

== Early life ==
Born in Los Angeles, California, Young played for Hamilton High School, Dorsey High School, and Cleveland High School in suburban Reseda, California. He averaged 27.2 points and 10.8 rebounds as a 2004 senior at Cleveland, earning 2004 CIF L.A. City Section, Los Angeles Times All-City and San Fernando Valley first team honors. Young shot 57.3% from the field and 46.8% from three-point range (52-of-111), had 48 steals and 41 blocks as Cleveland finished with a 25–4 record. He was tabbed the seventh-best player in the country by HoopScoop and listed by basketball columnist Frank Burlison as among the Top 50 recruits in 2004. Young once scored 56 points in one game and had 23 rebounds in another. He earned CIF L.A. City Section first team honors in 2003 and was included in a list of Top Seniors by Athlon Sports heading into 2004.

== College career ==
Young played for the University of Southern California from 2004 to 2007 and was All-Pac-10 First Team in the 2005–06 and 2006–07 seasons. In the 2007 NCAA Tournament, he led the fifth-seeded Trojans to a berth in the Sweet Sixteen, where they lost to the one-seeded North Carolina Tar Heels, 74–64. Along the way, Young led USC to a 77–60 first-round win against Arkansas. In the second round, he led the team with 22 points over the Texas Longhorns in an 87–68 win which featured the National Player of the Year, Kevin Durant, though Durant led both teams in scoring with 30.

As expected, following his junior season, Young announced on April 15, 2007, to the Los Angeles Times that he would forgo his senior year and enter the 2007 NBA draft, where Young was selected with the 16th overall pick by the Washington Wizards.

== Professional career ==
=== Washington Wizards (2007–2012) ===
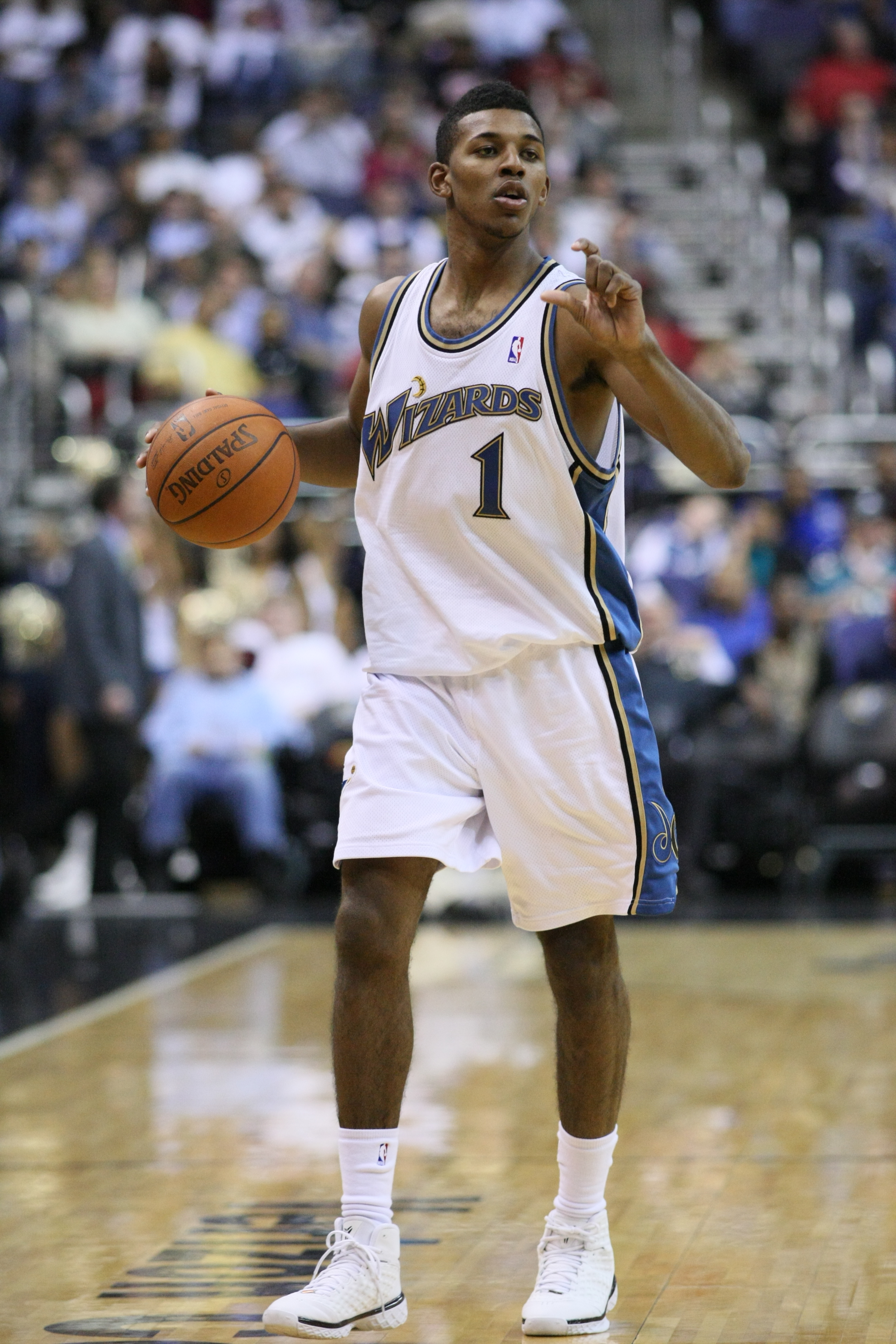
Young in 2008

Young was selected 16th overall by the Washington Wizards in the 2007 NBA draft. He started his first career NBA game on December 15, 2007, against the Sacramento Kings.

On January 9, 2010, Young was fined $10,000 by the Wizards for participating in antics before a game on January 5, 2010, against the Philadelphia 76ers. Gilbert Arenas was being investigated for a prior incident involving guns in the Wizards' locker room, but made light of the accusations by pointing his finger at his teammates, as if he were shooting them. Young's teammates were photographed smiling and laughing with him.

Young scored a career-high 43 points on January 11, 2011, against the Sacramento Kings.

=== Los Angeles Clippers (2012) ===
On March 15, 2012, Young was traded to his hometown team the Los Angeles Clippers in a three-way trade involving the Denver Nuggets and Washington Wizards. On April 16, 2012, Young helped the Clippers clinch their first playoff berth in six years with a 19-point performance against the Oklahoma City Thunder. He was also a key part of the Clippers' comeback victory against the Memphis Grizzlies in game one of the first round of the 2012 playoffs, making three three-pointers in under a minute.

=== Philadelphia 76ers (2012–2013) ===
On July 12, 2012, Young signed with the Philadelphia 76ers to a one-year deal.

=== Los Angeles Lakers (2013–2017) ===
On July 11, 2013, Young signed with the Los Angeles Lakers. During the 2013–14 season, he converted a Lakers-record seven four-point plays while averaging a career-high 17.9 points per game.

On July 21, 2014, Young re-signed with Lakers to a reported four-year, $21.5 million contract. During training camp, he suffered a complete tear of the radial collateral ligament in his right thumb, and was expected to miss six to eight weeks. After missing the first 10 games of the season with the injury, Young made his season debut on November 18 against the Atlanta Hawks, recording 17 points and five rebounds in a 114–109 win. On December 12, he scored a season-high 29 points in a 112–110 victory over the San Antonio Spurs.

On November 30, 2016, Young was ruled out for two to four weeks due to a strained right calf muscle. On December 17, he made eight three-pointers and scored a season-high 32 points in a 119–108 loss to the Cleveland Cavaliers. Between late December and early January, Young's burst from long range gave him 36 three-pointers in eight games—the most in an eight-game stretch in Lakers franchise history. On April 2, 2017, after being held out of 11 of the previous 12 games despite being healthy, Young was shut down by the Lakers for the last five regular-season games. On June 21, 2017, the Lakers announced that Young elected not to exercise his option to extend his contract for the 2017–18 season, thus becoming an unrestricted free agent.

=== Golden State Warriors (2017–2018) ===
On July 7, 2017, Young signed with the Golden State Warriors. During his Warriors debut in their season opener on October 17, Young came off the bench to hit six three-pointers and score 23 points in a narrow 122–121 loss to the Houston Rockets. He helped the Warriors reach the 2018 NBA Finals, where they defeated the Cleveland Cavaliers in a four-game sweep, with Young winning his first NBA championship.

=== Denver Nuggets (2018) ===
On December 10, 2018, Young signed with the Denver Nuggets. He was waived on December 30 after appearing in only four games.

=== Macau Black Bears (2023) ===
On September 26, 2023, Young signed with the Macau Black Bears of The Asian Tournament (TAT), but the event was cancelled.

== Career statistics ==
Legend
GP	Games played	GS	Games started	MPG	Minutes per game
FG%	Field goal percentage	3P%	3-point field goal percentage	FT%	Free throw percentage
RPG	Rebounds per game	APG	Assists per game	SPG	Steals per game
BPG	Blocks per game	PPG	Points per game	**Bold**	Career high
†	Won an NBA championship	*	Led the league

=== NBA ===
==== Regular season ====
Year	Team	GP	GS	MPG	FG%	3P%	FT%	RPG	APG	SPG	BPG	PPG
2007–08	Washington	75	2	15.4	.439	.400	.815	1.5	.8	.5	.1	7.5
2008–09	Washington	**82***	5	22.4	**.444**	.341	.850	1.8	1.2	.5	.2	10.9
2009–10	Washington	74	23	19.2	.418	**.406**	.800	1.4	.6	.4	.1	8.6
2010–11	Washington	64	40	**31.8**	.441	.387	.816	**2.7**	1.2	.7	**.3**	17.4
2011–12	Washington	40	32	30.3	.406	.371	.862	2.4	1.1	**.8**	**.3**	16.6
2011–12	L.A. Clippers	22	3	23.5	.394	.353	.821	1.6	.5	.6	**.3**	9.7
2012–13	Philadelphia	59	17	23.9	.413	.357	.820	1.8	1.4	.6	.2	10.6
2013–14	L.A. Lakers	64	9	28.3	.435	.386	.825	2.6	**1.5**	.7	.2	**17.9**
2014–15	L.A. Lakers	42	0	23.8	.366	.369	**.892**	2.3	1.0	.5	.3	13.4
2015–16	L.A. Lakers	54	2	19.1	.339	.325	.829	1.8	.6	.4	.1	7.3
2016–17	L.A. Lakers	60	**60**	25.9	.430	.404	.856	2.3	1.0	.6	.2	13.2
2017–18†	Golden State	80	8	17.4	.412	.377	.862	1.6	.5	.5	.1	7.3
2018–19	Denver	4	0	9.3	.333	.375	.000	.3	.5	.0	.3	2.3
Career		720	201	22.8	.418	.376	.836	2.0	1.0	.5	.2	11.4

==== Playoffs ====
Year	Team	GP	GS	MPG	FG%	3P%	FT%	RPG	APG	SPG	BPG	PPG
2008	Washington	4	0	4.3	.111	.000	.750	.5	**.3**	**.5**	.0	1.3
2012	L.A. Clippers	11	0	**18.2**	**.433**	**.515**	**.889**	**1.1**	**.3**	.3	**.4**	**8.3**
2018†	Golden State	**20**	**2**	10.3	.302	.298	.750	.6	.2	.1	.0	2.6
Career		35	2	12.1	.357	.378	.833	.7	.2	.2	.1	4.2

=== College ===
Year	Team	GP	GS	MPG	FG%	3P%	FT%	RPG	APG	SPG	BPG	PPG
2004–05	USC	29	24	25.7	.441	.315	.644	4.1	1.3	.8	**.3**	11.1
2005–06	USC	30	30	**33.9**	.467	.333	**.801**	**6.6**	**1.6**	**1.0**	.2	17.3
2006–07	USC	**37**	**36**	33.2	**.525**	**.440**	.786	4.6	1.4	.7	**.3**	**17.5**
Career		96	90	31.1	.483	.368	.764	5.1	1.4	.8	.3	15.5

== Boxing career ==
On September 10, 2022, Young made his boxing debut against TikTok star Malcolm Minikon in an exhibition bout as the co-feature on the Austin McBroom vs. AnEsonGib at the Banc of California Stadium. The bout ended as a no contest after an accidental headbutt was performed by Minikon.

== Personal life ==
Young's parents are Charles and Mae Young. He grew up in Los Angeles with four brothers. Young's oldest brother, Charles Jr., was killed by a gang when Nick was only five years old.

In 2007, Young became the main subject of a documentary titled Second Chance Season, in which his exploits, shortcomings, and successes are reviewed, as well as giving a glimpse of his family. Young's nickname is "Swaggy P", which he said is a pseudo-biblical reference to "the Prophet of Swag". In October 2025, Young was cast as character number 13 for the Fox show Special Forces: World's Toughest Test (season four). He quit the show after the fifth episode.

=== Relationships and family ===
Young is the cousin of fellow NBA player Kevon Looney. They became teammates with the Warriors in 2017–18 and won the NBA championship together that season. Young is also a cousin of rappers Kendrick Lamar and Baby Keem.

Young has been in an on-again, off-again relationship with his high school sweetheart, Keonna Green, since 2002. They have had four children together: three sons (born in 2012, 2019 and 2024) and a daughter (born in 2016). They became engaged in 2019.

Young and Australian rapper Iggy Azalea announced their engagement on June 1, 2015. Azalea broke off their engagement a year later after a video of Young discussing how he was having an affair with another woman surfaced. After Azalea broke off her engagement to Young, Green confirmed that she was 22 weeks pregnant with their daughter.

=== Meme ===
In October 2014, Young uploaded a YouTube video of himself going about his daily life with an assistant known as "Big Meat". A screenshot of the video, showing Young giving a perplexed look, went viral soon after, becoming an internet meme. Reflecting on it, Young once remarked, "Some people only recognize me for that — ain't you the meme guy?"

=== Podcasting career ===
Currently, Young is part of "Gil's Arena" cast alongside his Wizard teammate Gilbert Arenas.
