= Randy Foye =

American basketball player (born 1983)

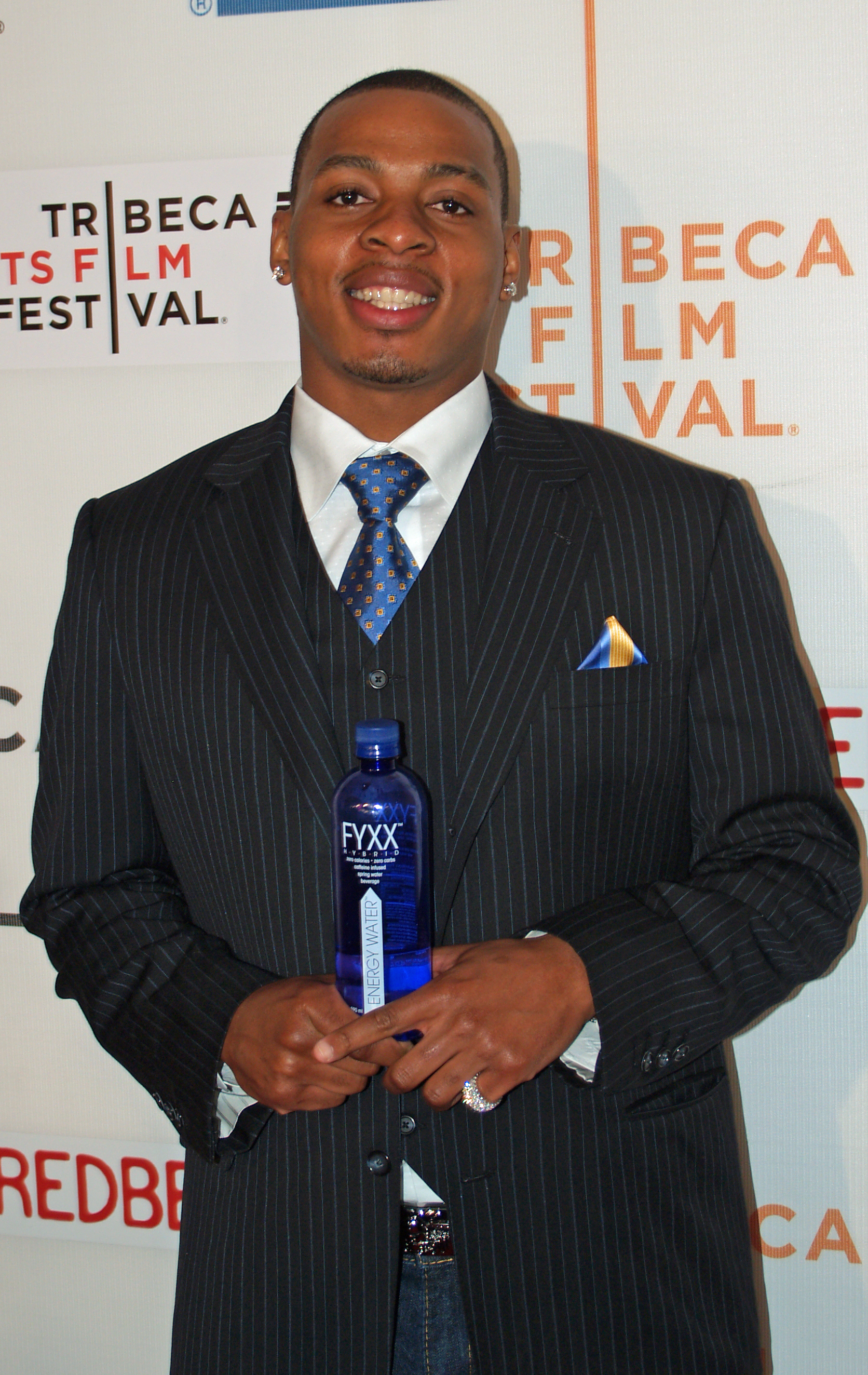
- Foye at the 2008 Tribeca Film Festival

Personal information
- Born: September 24, 1983 (age 43) Newark, New Jersey, U.S.
- Listed height: 6 ft 4 in (1.93 m)
- Listed weight: 218 lb (99 kg)

Career information
- High school: East Side (Newark, New Jersey)
- College: Villanova (2002–2006)
- NBA draft: 2006: 1st round, 7th overall pick
- Drafted by: Boston Celtics
- Playing career: 2006–2017
- Position: Shooting guard / point guard
- Number: 4, 15, 6, 8, 2

Career history
- 2006–2009: Minnesota Timberwolves
- 2009–2010: Washington Wizards
- 2010–2012: Los Angeles Clippers
- 2012–2013: Utah Jazz
- 2013–2016: Denver Nuggets
- 2016: Oklahoma City Thunder
- 2016–2017: Brooklyn Nets

Career highlights
- NBA All-Rookie First Team (2007); Consensus first-team All-American (2006); Big East Player of the Year (2006); First-team All-Big East (2006); Third-team All-Big East (2005); Robert V. Geasey Trophy (2006); No. 2 retired by Villanova Wildcats
- Stats at NBA.com
- Stats at Basketball Reference
Medals
Men's basketball
Representing the United States
Summer Universiade
Gold medal – first place	2005 Izmir	Team competition

Randy Foye (born September 24, 1983) is an American former professional basketball player. He played collegiately at Villanova University. He was selected seventh overall in the 2006 NBA draft by the Boston Celtics, but was immediately traded to the Portland Trail Blazers, and later traded to the Minnesota Timberwolves where he began his career.

== High school career ==
Foye attended East Side High School in Newark, where he was selected as New Jersey Player of the Year, before being recruited by Jay Wright and Villanova.

Considered a four-star recruit by Scout.com, Foye was listed as the No. 7 shooting guard and the No. 37 player in the nation in 2002.

== College career ==
Foye, along with Allan Ray, Curtis Sumpter, and Jason Fraser were proclaimed as the players to lead the Villanova Wildcats back to a championship. Foye and Ray reached the Elite Eight of the 2006 NCAA Tournament, playing with the other three starters in the four-guard offense (Kyle Lowry, Mike Nardi and Will Sheridan), while Sumpter was sidelined as a medical redshirt with a knee injury.

Foye's college career was productive and eventful, but his senior season was by far the best statistically.

In the 2005 NCAA Tournament, Foye averaged 20 points in three games, before a heartbreaking loss to #1 seed and eventual national champion North Carolina in which Foye scored a career-high 28 points. He was named third-team all Big East that year.

In 2006, Foye won the honor of Big East Player of the Year, beating out teammate Allan Ray, Connecticut star Rudy Gay and the league's leading scorer Quincy Douby of Rutgers.

Villanova tied for the Big East regular season championship with Uconn and split their two games with the Huskies, winning the one played at home, in what some called the biggest Villanova win in over 20 years. Their final Big East regular season record was 14–2 in what some called the toughest conference ever. Overall, their record was 28–5. In the NCAA Tournament in 2006, Foye continued to be Villanova's biggest scoring threat. He had 24 points in their second-round game against Arizona in a winning effort. Foye scored a team-high 25 points in his final game as a Wildcat, on March 26, 2006, a 75–62 loss to Florida in the Elite Eight.

As a senior Foye averaged 20.5 points, 5.9 rebounds, 3.3 assists, 1.4 steals, and 0.6 blocks, with a field goal percentage of 41.1%.

== Professional career ==
=== Minnesota Timberwolves (2006–2009) ===
On June 28, 2006, Foye was selected seventh overall in the 2006 NBA draft by the Boston Celtics, but was immediately traded to the Portland Trail Blazers, and later traded to the Minnesota Timberwolves. He entered his rookie year on a team that already had six guards on its roster. Off-season free-agent acquisition Mike James was slated to start at point guard, Foye's most likely position in the NBA, with Ricky Davis at small forward and Rashad McCants at shooting guard. This left Foye to battle for minutes on a bench full of guards. In November, Foye's first month as a professional basketball player, Timberwolves coach Dwane Casey only gave Foye an average of 14.6 minutes per game. Foye, however, was productive whenever he was given minutes. He scored in double digits in each of the four games he was given 20 or more minutes of playing time.

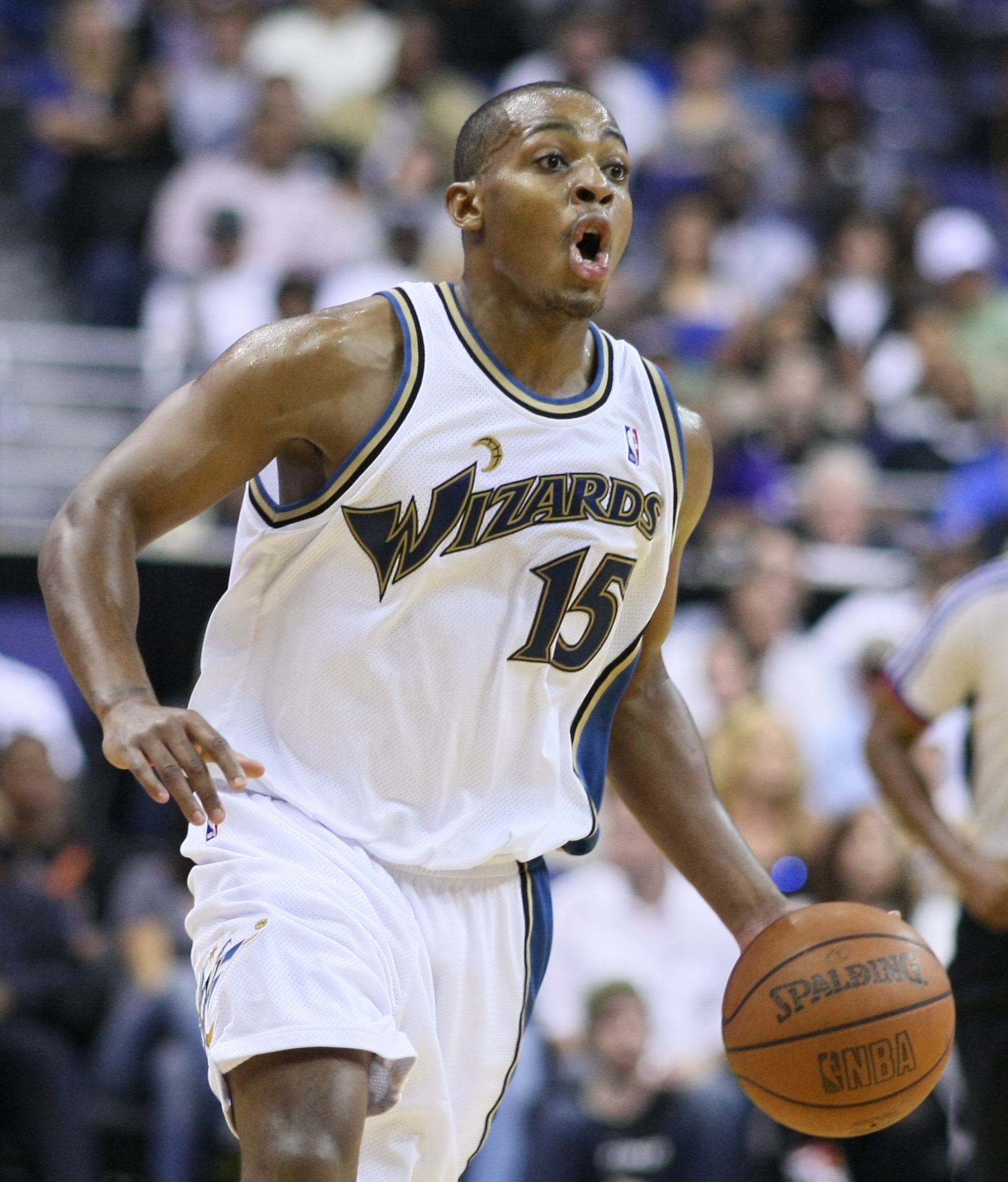
Foye as a member of the Washington Wizards

In December 2007, Foye's minutes per game average increased to 19.6 and he scored in double digits in half of the T-Wolves' games. However, after Dwane Casey's firing after the Twolves' 40th game (when they had a record of 20–20), the Twolves struggled, yet the young star played well when given minutes. In March, Foye saw nearly 24 minutes of playing time a night, and in April saw almost 27 minutes a night to perform.

Foye played all 82 games (12 starts) in his rookie season and averaged 22.9 minutes, 10.1 points, 2.7 rebounds, 2.8 assists, 0.65 steals, and 0.3 blocks per game. Among rookies, he ranked fifth in scoring (10.1 ppg), eighth in field goal percentage (43.4%), third in 3-point shooting percentage (37%), third in free throw shooting percentage (85%), 5th in assists (2.8 apg) and 9th in steals (0.65 spg). He was one of the most consistent rookie performers and was selected to the NBA All-Rookie First Team.

On December 23, 2008, Foye pulled down 16 rebounds to set a career high and break the team record of 15 for a guard set by Isaiah Rider in 1996. Foye also had 26 points and 1 assist in the 99–93 loss to the San Antonio Spurs.

=== Washington Wizards (2009–2010) ===
On June 23, 2009, Foye, along with Mike Miller, was traded to the Washington Wizards for Oleksiy Pecherov, Etan Thomas, Darius Songaila, and a first round draft pick.

On January 9, 2010, Foye was fined $10,000 by the Washington Wizards for participating in Gilbert Arenas' antics before a game on January 5, 2010, against the Philadelphia 76ers. Arenas was being investigated for a prior incident involving guns in the Wizards' locker room, but made light of the accusations by pointing his finger at his teammates, as if he were shooting them. His teammates were photographed smiling and laughing with him.

=== Los Angeles Clippers (2010–2012) ===
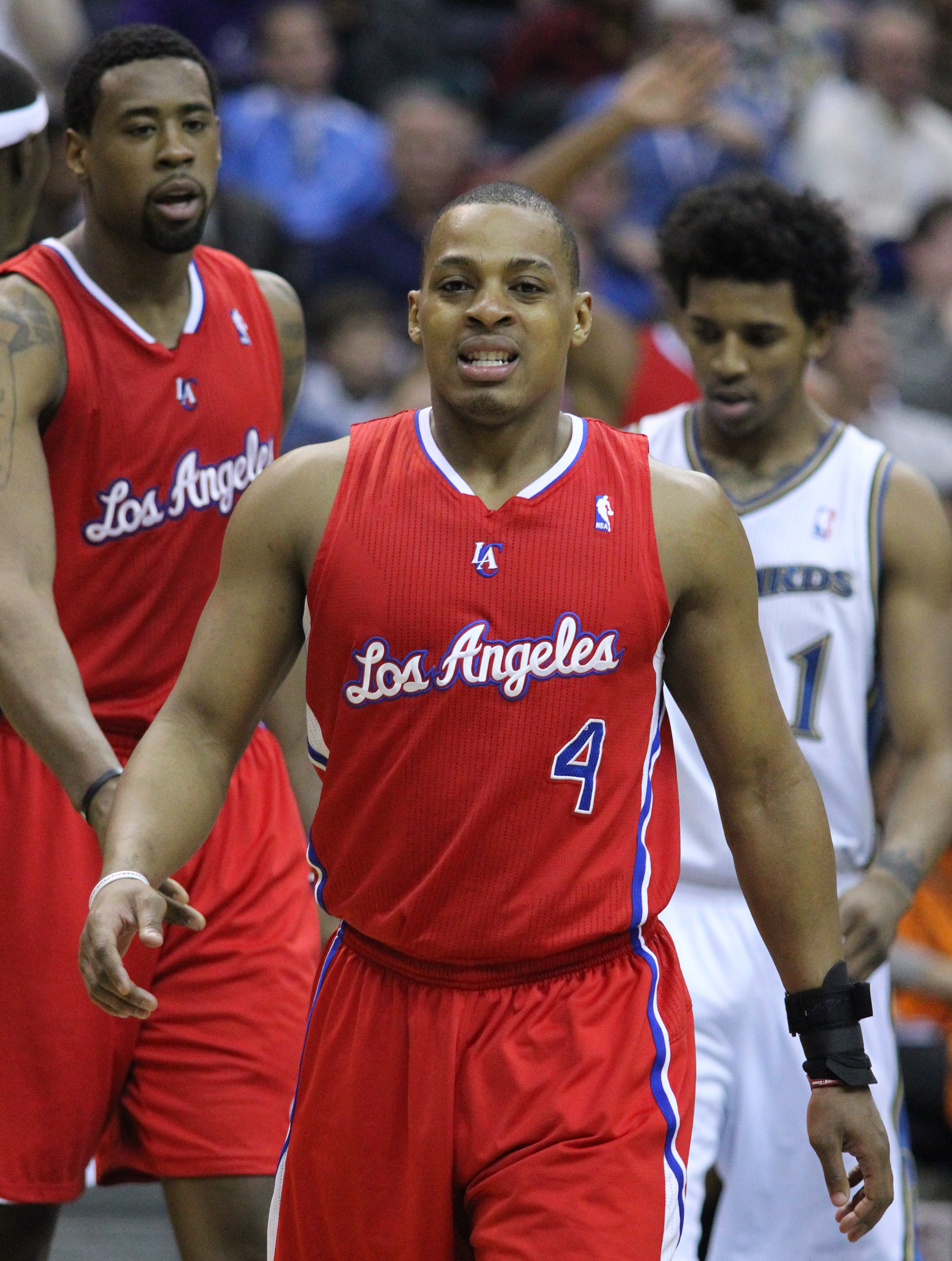
Foye (center) with DeAndre Jordan (left) and Nick Young (right) in 2011

On July 8, 2010, Foye was signed by the Los Angeles Clippers. Foye started the year as a backup, but moved into the starting rotation following an injury to Eric Gordon and trade of Baron Davis. On February 11, 2011, he scored 32 points with seven assists and two steals while shooting 50 percent from the field in a 99–92 loss to the Boston Celtics.

In his first season in LA, Foye developed chemistry with Rookie of the Year Blake Griffin, establishing himself as LA's shooting guard heading into the 2011–12 season. However a busy lockout-delayed offseason saw the Clippers acquire All-Stars Chris Paul and Chauncey Billups, moving Foye back to a reserve role. He would end up starting most off the year and all 11 playoff games after Billups sustained a season-ending injury, averaging 11 points, two rebounds and two assists a game.

=== Utah Jazz (2012–2013) ===
On July 25, 2012, Foye agreed to terms with the Utah Jazz. During the one season Foye played for the Jazz, he set the franchise record for most 3-pointers made in a year, making 178 out of 434 shots (with a shooting percentage of 41%).

=== Denver Nuggets (2013–2016) ===
On July 10, 2013, Foye was traded to the Denver Nuggets as part of a three-team trade involving the Jazz and the Golden State Warriors. On February 3, 2014, Foye hit the first game-winning shot of his eight-year NBA career, making a 30-foot three-pointer as time expired to claim a 116–115 win over the Los Angeles Clippers.

On December 23, 2015, Foye scored a season-high 31 points and made seven three-pointers in a 104–96 win over the Phoenix Suns. Statistical lineup analysis from the 2015–16 season showed that several of Denver’s most effective units in net rating featured Foye and rookie Nikola Jokić playing together.

=== Oklahoma City Thunder (2016) ===
On February 18, 2016, Foye was traded to the Oklahoma City Thunder in exchange for D. J. Augustin, Steve Novak, two second-round draft picks and cash considerations. Three days later, he made his debut for the Thunder in a 115–92 loss to the Cleveland Cavaliers, recording two points and one assist in 14 minutes off the bench. Foye appeared in the first conference finals series of his career that postseason, as the Thunder lost to the defending NBA champion Golden State Warriors in seven games in the Western Conference Finals.

=== Brooklyn Nets (2016–2017) ===
On July 15, 2016, Foye signed with his hometown team the Brooklyn Nets. He missed the first six games of the 2016–17 season with a strained right hamstring. On December 26, 2016, Foye made a three-pointer to beat the buzzer and give the Nets a 120–118 victory over the Charlotte Hornets.

== NBA career statistics ==
Legend
GP	Games played	GS	Games started	MPG	Minutes per game
FG%	Field goal percentage	3P%	3-point field goal percentage	FT%	Free throw percentage
RPG	Rebounds per game	APG	Assists per game	SPG	Steals per game
BPG	Blocks per game	PPG	Points per game	**Bold**	Career high
*	Led the league

=== Regular season ===
Year	Team	GP	GS	MPG	FG%	3P%	FT%	RPG	APG	SPG	BPG	PPG
2006–07	Minnesota	**82***	12	22.9	**.434**	.368	.854	2.7	2.8	.6	.3	10.1
2007–08	Minnesota	39	31	32.3	.429	**.412**	.815	**3.3**	4.2	.9	.1	13.1
2008–09	Minnesota	70	61	**35.6**	.407	.360	.846	3.1	**4.3**	**1.0**	.4	**16.3**
2009–10	Washington	70	38	23.8	.414	.346	.890	1.9	3.3	.5	.1	10.1
2010–11	L.A. Clippers	63	24	24.6	.388	.327	**.893**	1.6	2.7	.7	.3	9.8
2011–12	L.A. Clippers	65	48	25.9	.398	.386	.859	2.1	2.2	.7	.4	11.0
2012–13	Utah	**82***	72	27.4	.397	.410	.819	1.5	2.0	.8	.3	10.8
2013–14	Denver	81	**78**	30.7	.413	.380	.849	2.9	3.5	.8	**.5**	13.2
2014–15	Denver	50	21	21.7	.368	.357	.818	1.7	2.4	.7	.2	8.7
2015–16	Denver	54	7	19.8	.351	.296	.830	1.9	2.1	.5	.3	6.0
2015–16	Oklahoma City	27	1	21.2	.349	.309	.815	1.9	1.8	.5	**.5**	5.6
2016–17	Brooklyn	69	40	18.6	.363	.330	.857	2.2	2.0	.5	.1	5.2
Career		752	433	25.6	.401	.366	.852	2.2	2.8	.7	.3	10.3

=== Playoffs ===
Year	Team	GP	GS	MPG	FG%	3P%	FT%	RPG	APG	SPG	BPG	PPG
2012	L.A. Clippers	11	**11**	**26.5**	**.392**	**.438**	.846	**2.0**	**1.5**	**.5**	**.3**	**7.5**
2016	Oklahoma City	**16**	0	11.9	.341	.308	**1.000**	1.3	.8	.1	.2	2.5
Career		27	11	17.8	.374	.379	.882	1.6	1.1	.3	.2	4.6

== Personal life ==
Foye was born with a condition called situs inversus that caused him to be born with his organs reversed, meaning his heart is on the right side of his body and his liver is on the left. Due to his inverted organs, Foye featured on a 2015 BBC series called Countdown to Life explaining how his condition was caused. The show stated Foye was lucky to be alive, because his organs are a perfect mirror image of the normal system of human organs. If only a few of his organs had swapped, this could have caused severe disability or death.

Foye has also appeared on a PBS documentary 9 Months That Made You which premiered June 29, 2016 discussing his condition.

Foye appeared in the sitcom Wingin' It, guest-starring as himself.

A resident of Rumson, New Jersey, Foye purchased his home from Bruce Springsteen.

Foye has two daughters, Paige Christine Foye and Penny Carter Foye.

Started the Randy Foye Foundation in 2007 which focuses on helping inner city kids in Newark, NJ.
