= Cartier Martin =

American basketball player (born 1984)

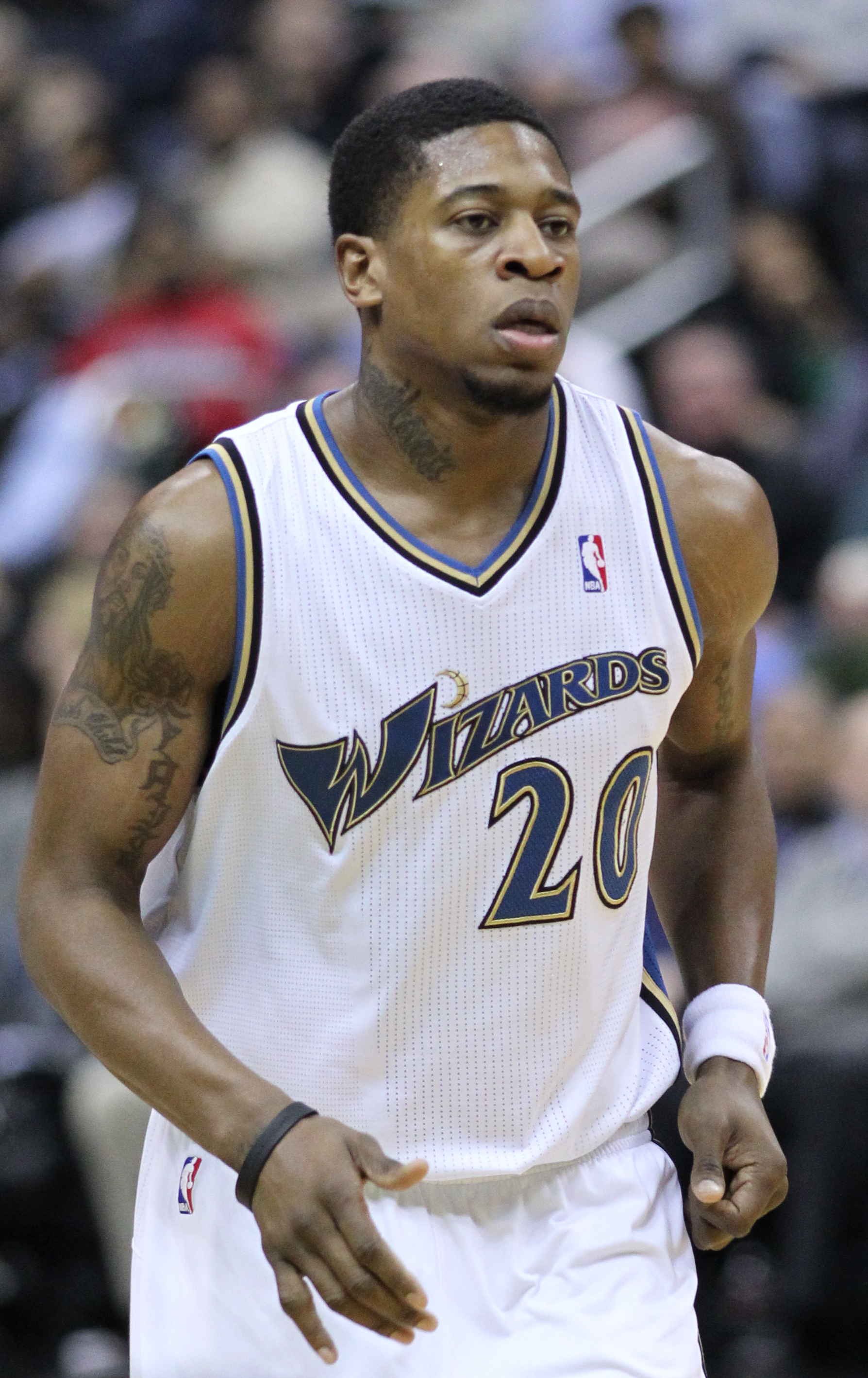
- Martin with the Washington Wizards in 2011

Personal information
- Born: November 20, 1984 (age 41) Crockett, Texas, U.S.
- Listed height: 6 ft 7 in (2.01 m)
- Listed weight: 220 lb (100 kg)

Career information
- High school: Nimitz (Houston, Texas)
- College: Kansas State (2003–2007)
- NBA draft: 2007: undrafted
- Playing career: 2007–2017
- Position: Small forward / shooting guard
- Number: 1, 20, 15, 35

Career history
- 2007–2008: Antalya BB
- 2008–2010: Iowa Energy
- 2009: Charlotte Bobcats
- 2009: Benetton Treviso
- 2010: Golden State Warriors
- 2010–2011: Washington Wizards
- 2011–2012: Jilin Northeast Tigers
- 2012: Iowa Energy
- 2012–2013: Washington Wizards
- 2013–2014: Atlanta Hawks
- 2014: Chicago Bulls
- 2014: Atlanta Hawks
- 2014–2015: Detroit Pistons
- 2015–2017: Iowa Energy
- 2017: Windy City Bulls
- 2017: SAN-EN NeoPhoenix

Career highlights
- NBA D-League All-Star (2010); All-NBA D-League First Team (2010); All-NBA D-League Third Team (2009); Big 12 Sixth Man of the Year (2007); 2× Second-team All-Big 12 (2006, 2007); Fourth-team Parade All-American (2003)
- Stats at NBA.com
- Stats at Basketball Reference

Cartier Alexander Martin (/kɑːrˈtiːeɪ/ kar-TEE-ay; born November 20, 1984) is an American former professional basketball player who played seven seasons in the National Basketball Association (NBA). He played college basketball for Kansas State.

== College career ==
He spent his college career at Kansas State University and is one of the top all-time scoring leaders at the school. His first three seasons he was coached by Jim Wooldridge and his senior year he was coached by Bob Huggins.

== Professional career ==
After his senior season, he entered the 2007 NBA draft but went undrafted. In his first professional year, he went overseas to play for the Turkish Basketball League's Antalya Büyükşehir Belediyesi. After one season in Europe, he was selected in the first round (15th pick overall) of the 2008 NBA Development League Draft by the Iowa Energy.

On January 29, 2009, he was signed to a 10-day contract by the Charlotte Bobcats, having averaged 20.6 points per game in 21 games with the Iowa Energy. He was named to the 2009 D-League All-Star Game, although he did not compete owing to his status with the Bobcats.

He was signed by the Bobcats to a second 10-day contract on February 8, and then signed for the rest of the season on February 18, 2009.

In July 2009, he was signed by the Italian league outfit Benetton Treviso to a 2-year contract. He returned to the Iowa Energy in December 2009.

On January 10, 2010, Martin was signed to a 10-day contract by the Golden State Warriors. After his second 10-day expired, he returned to the Iowa Energy of the NBA D-League. On March 30, Martin signed a 10-day contract with the Washington Wizards. On April 9, he signed with the Wizards for the rest of their season.

In August 2010, Martin was invited by the Wizards to their training camp for the 2010–11 season. On April 6, 2011, he was waived by the Wizards. On July 10, he signed with Jilin Northeast Tigers of the Chinese Basketball Association.

After playing in China, Martin returned to the Iowa Energy on March 4, 2012. On March 28, he was signed by the Wizards on a 10-day contract.

On July 12, 2012, Martin re-signed with the Wizards.

On October 15, 2013, he signed with the Atlanta Hawks. On January 7, 2014, he was waived by the Hawks. In 25 games, he averaged 6.6 points per game. On January 10, he signed a 10-day contract with the Chicago Bulls. On January 20, he signed a second 10-day contract with the Bulls. He was subsequently not signed for the rest of season after his second 10-day contract expired. On February 1, Martin signed a 10-day contract with the Atlanta Hawks. On February 11, he signed a second 10-day contract with the Hawks. On February 21, he signed with the Hawks for the rest of the season.

On August 18, 2014, Martin signed with the Detroit Pistons. In 23 games during the 2014–15 season with Detroit, Martin averaged 1.6 points, 0.9 rebounds and 0.5 assists in 8.6 minutes per game. On June 1, 2015, he exercised his player option for the 2015–16 season with the Pistons worth $1.27 million. On October 23, 2015, he was waived by the Pistons. On October 31, he was selected by the Iowa Energy with the fourth overall pick in the 2015 NBA Development League draft. On January 12, 2016, he was waived by Iowa.

On October 29, 2016, Martin was reacquired by the Iowa Energy. On March 17, 2017, Martin was waived by the Energy. Three days later, he was acquired by the Windy City Bulls.

=== The Basketball Tournament (TBT) (2017–present) ===
In the summer of 2017, Martin played in The Basketball Tournament on ESPN for The Stickmen. He competed for the $2 million prize, and for The Stickmen, he averaged 16.5 points per game and 7.5 rebounds per game. Martin helped take The Stickmen to the second round of the tournament, where they then lost to Team Challenge ALS 87–73.

== NBA career statistics ==
Legend
GP	Games played	GS	Games started	MPG	Minutes per game
FG%	Field goal percentage	3P%	3-point field goal percentage	FT%	Free throw percentage
RPG	Rebounds per game	APG	Assists per game	SPG	Steals per game
BPG	Blocks per game	PPG	Points per game	**Bold**	Career high

=== Regular season ===
Year	Team	GP	GS	MPG	FG%	3P%	FT%	RPG	APG	SPG	BPG	PPG
2008–09	Charlotte	33	1	8.1	.364	.303	.800	1.0	.4	.2	.1	2.6
2009–10	Golden State	10	2	**27.6**	.364	.323	.762	**4.7**	**.9**	**.8**	.0	9.0
2009–10	Washington	8	0	14.3	.375	.389	**.889**	2.6	**.9**	.4	.1	6.4
2010–11	Washington	52	1	10.4	.390	.394	.700	1.4	.3	.3	.1	4.0
2011–12	Washington	17	2	23.0	.440	.387	.579	3.4	.6	.6	.1	**9.3**
2012–13	Washington	41	3	16.9	.381	.397	.714	2.4	.5	.5	.1	6.6
2013–14	Atlanta	**53**	**6**	15.5	.414	.384	.754	2.0	.6	.5	.1	5.9
2013–14	Chicago	6	0	8.0	**.625**	**.600**	.500	.8	.3	.2	.0	2.5
2014–15	Detroit	23	0	8.6	.283	.182	.000	.9	.5	.1	.0	1.6
Career		243	15	13.8	.392	.372	.729	1.9	.5	.4	.1	5.1

=== Playoffs ===
Year	Team	GP	GS	MPG	FG%	3P%	FT%	RPG	APG	SPG	BPG	PPG
2014	Atlanta	3	0	15.0	.667	.000	.000	3.0	0.0	2.0	0.0	4.0
Career		3	0	15.0	.667	.000	.000	3.0	0.0	2.0	0.0	4.0

== Personal life ==
In 2011, it was reported that Martin had lost $374,000 in a ponzi scheme.
