= Mike Miller (basketball, born 1980) =

American basketball player (born 1980)

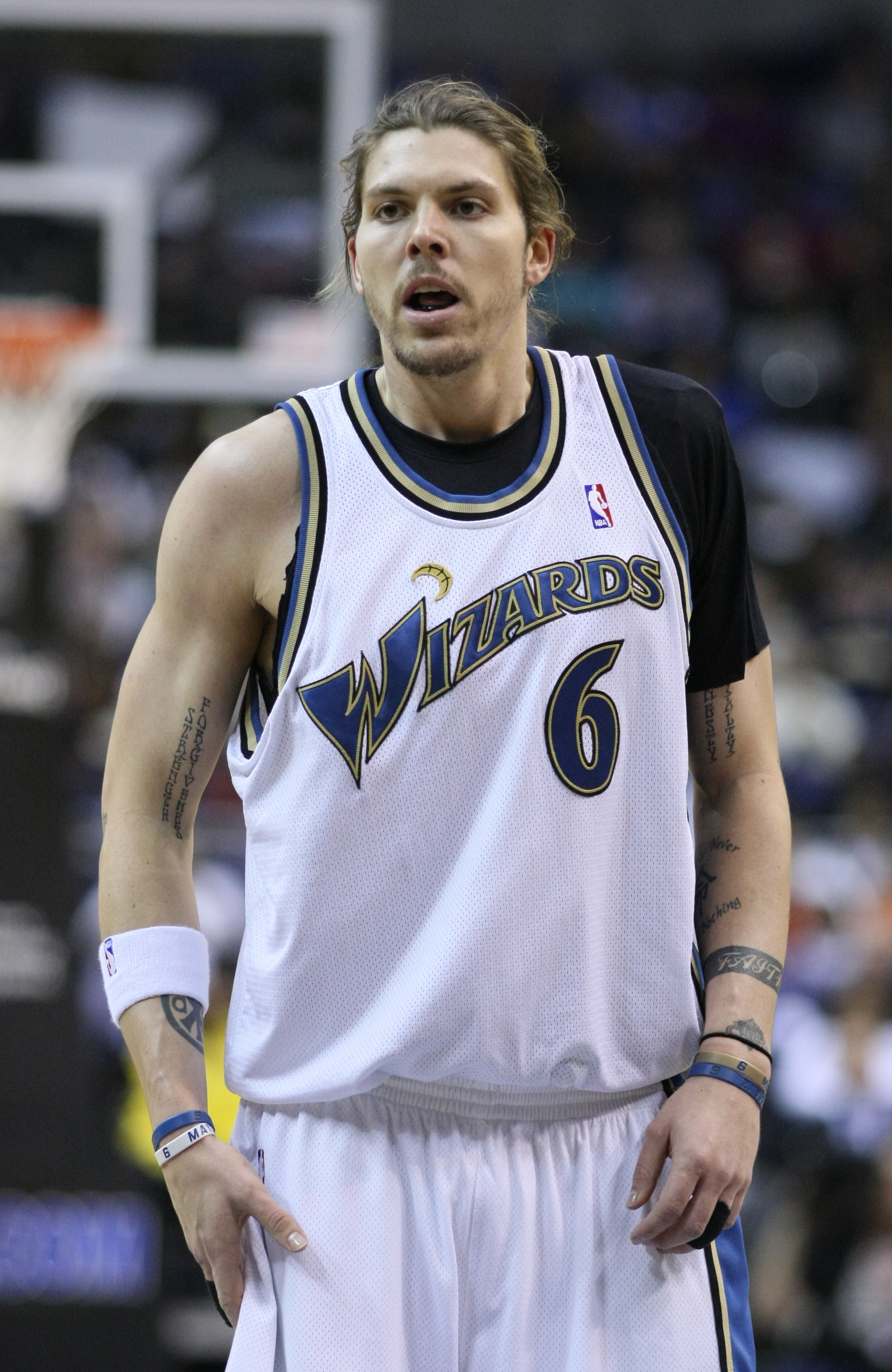
- Miller with the Washington Wizards in 2009

Personal information
- Born: February 19, 1980 (age 46) Mitchell, South Dakota, U.S.
- Listed height: 6 ft 8 in (2.03 m)
- Listed weight: 218 lb (99 kg)

Career information
- High school: Mitchell (Mitchell, South Dakota)
- College: Florida (1998–2000)
- NBA draft: 2000: 1st round, 5th overall pick
- Drafted by: Orlando Magic
- Playing career: 2000–2017
- Position: Small forward / shooting guard
- Number: 50, 33, 6, 13, 18, 3
- Coaching career: 2018–2021

Career history

Playing
- 2000–2003: Orlando Magic
- 2003–2008: Memphis Grizzlies
- 2008–2009: Minnesota Timberwolves
- 2009–2010: Washington Wizards
- 2010–2013: Miami Heat
- 2013–2014: Memphis Grizzlies
- 2014–2015: Cleveland Cavaliers
- 2015–2017: Denver Nuggets

Coaching
- 2018–2020: Memphis (assistant)
- 2020–2021: Houston HS

Career highlights
- 2× NBA champion (2012, 2013); NBA Sixth Man of the Year (2006); NBA Rookie of the Year (2001); NBA All-Rookie First Team (2001); Second-team Parade All-American (1998); McDonald's All-American (1998)

Career NBA statistics
- Points: 10,973 (10.6 ppg)
- Rebounds: 4,376 (4.2 rpg)
- Assists: 2,666 (2.6 apg)
- Stats at NBA.com
- Stats at Basketball Reference
Medals
Men's basketball
Representing United States
FIBA Americas Championship
Gold medal – first place	2007 Las Vegas	National team
Goodwill Games
Gold medal – first place	2001 Brisbane	National team
FIBA Americas U18 Championship
Gold medal – first place	1998 Puerto Plata	National team

Michael Lloyd Miller (born February 19, 1980) is an American former professional basketball player and coach. He played 17 seasons in the National Basketball Association (NBA) after being selected by the Orlando Magic in the first round of the 2000 NBA draft with the fifth overall pick. Miller was named the NBA Rookie of the Year with the Magic in 2001 and was voted NBA Sixth Man of the Year with the Memphis Grizzlies in 2006. He won two consecutive NBA championships with the Miami Heat in 2012 and 2013.

Miller played college basketball for the Florida Gators before entering the NBA. He also played professionally for the Minnesota Timberwolves, Washington Wizards, Cleveland Cavaliers, and Denver Nuggets. He was a swingman who was primarily a three-point specialist.

After his playing career, he became a college assistant coach with the Memphis Tigers. He resigned after two seasons before becoming the head coach at Houston High. He coached Houston High to their first ever basketball state championship winning 62–43 on March 20, 2021 in his only season with the school.

In 2020, Miller founded Let It Fly Team Sports Management, a full-service agency that represents college and professional football and basketball players. His clients include Orlando Magic forward Paolo Banchero and New Orleans Pelicans point guard Jeremiah Fears.

== College career ==
Miller accepted an athletic scholarship to attend the University of Florida, where he played for coach Billy Donovan's Gators teams from 1998 until 2000. He quickly became known for his ability to hit the three-pointer. As a sophomore, Miller helped the Gators avoid an upset bid by Butler in the first round of the NCAA Tournament, winning 69–68 in overtime on his floater in the lane as the buzzer sounded. This fueled the Gators' path to the 2000 NCAA Championship game, ultimately losing to Michigan State. After the 2000 NCAA Tournament, Miller declared himself eligible for the NBA draft.

== Professional career ==
=== Orlando Magic (2000–2003) ===
The following summer, Miller was taken with the fifth overall pick in the 2000 NBA draft by the Orlando Magic. His debut game was played on October 31, 2000, in a 97–86 win over the Washington Wizards where he recorded 5 points, 2 rebounds and 3 steals.

Miller won the 2001 NBA Rookie of the Year Award while being the only first-year player to appear in all 82 regular season games during the 2000–01 season (starting 62), in which he averaged 11.9 points and 4.0 rebounds per game while shooting 40.7% from three-point range.

=== Memphis Grizzlies (2003–2008) ===
Miller was traded to the Memphis Grizzlies alongside Ryan Humphrey midway through 2002–03 NBA season for Gordan Giriček and Drew Gooden. On October 4, 2003, Miller signed a six-year, $47.25 million extension through the 2009–10 season. He was the recipient of the NBA Sixth Man of the Year Award for the 2005–06 season. He averaged 13.7 points 5.4 rebounds 2.7 assists while shooting 47% from the field and 41% from three, while playing 30.6 minutes per game.

On January 3, 2007, Miller made nine three-pointers in a win over the Golden State Warriors, breaking Sam Mack's Grizzlies franchise record of eight in a game set in February 1999. The two previous games Miller hit seven threes. This made him the first NBA player to hit at least seven three-pointers in three consecutive games since the Dallas Mavericks' George McCloud achieved it in 1996. Miller held the Memphis Grizzlies franchise record for most points scored in a single game, with 45 on February 21, 2007, against the Golden State Warriors. The record was later broken by Ja Morant in February 2022. After the 2006–07 NBA season, Miller was announced as a member of the USA Basketball team.

=== Minnesota Timberwolves (2008–2009) ===
On June 26, 2008, Miller, Brian Cardinal, Jason Collins, and the 5th pick of the 2008 NBA draft, Kevin Love, were sent to Minnesota in exchange for Marko Jarić, Antoine Walker, Greg Buckner and the 3rd pick, O. J. Mayo. Miller averaged a career-high 4.5 assists per game but a career-low 9.9 points per game in his only season with the Timberwolves.

=== Washington Wizards (2009–2010) ===
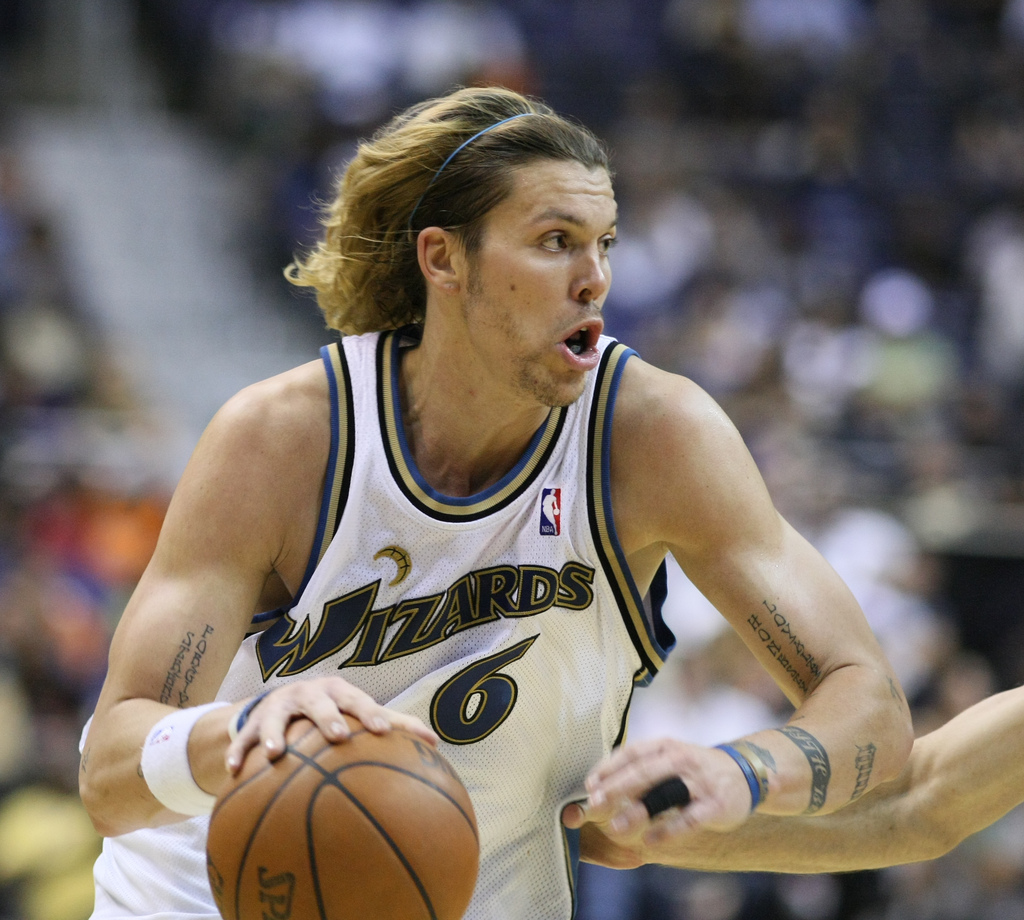
Miller with the Wizards in 2009

On June 23, 2009, Miller and Randy Foye were sent to the Washington Wizards for Oleksiy Pecherov, Etan Thomas, Darius Songaila and the 5th overall pick in the 2009 NBA draft. Miller suffered a shoulder injury and missed a few games during the early part of the 2009–10 NBA season. In 54 games, he averaged 10.9 points per game, his last-ever double-digit scoring average in a season, but was second in the league in three-point field goal accuracy, at 48.0%.

=== Miami Heat (2010–2013) ===
On July 15, 2010, Miller signed a five-year, $25 million contract with the Miami Heat, reuniting with his former Gators teammate Udonis Haslem. He injured his thumb while guarding LeBron James in practice during the preseason, sidelining him for several weeks. Miller officially returned to the Miami Heat lineup on December 20, 2010, in a home game against the Dallas Mavericks. Miller got his first start on January 22, 2011, due to a Dwyane Wade illness, and contributed with a season-high 32 points in a win over the Toronto Raptors. Miller averaged just 2.6 points a game in 12 minutes a game during the playoffs, with a high of 12 in game 4 against the Chicago Bulls. Miller made his first career NBA Finals appearance in the 2011 NBA Finals, which the Heat lost to the Mavericks 4–2.

In the next season, on January 18, 2012, Miller made six of six three-point field goals in a victory over the San Antonio Spurs to finish with 18 points in his return to the Heat, after missing several games because of an injury.

In the playoffs, Miller averaged 5.2 points per game, and scored in double figures at least once in each of the Heat's playoff series as Miami advanced to the NBA Finals to face the Oklahoma City Thunder. In game 5, Miller made seven three-pointers, setting the NBA Finals record for most three-pointers by a reserve. He had not made any three-pointers in the previous four games of the series. He finished with 23 points, 5 rebounds and a steal in game 5. Miami would go on to win the game and the NBA championship.

During the 2012–13 season, Miller was inserted into the starting lineup 17 times and averaged 4.8 points per game for the season. The Heat would again advance to the NBA Finals, this time against the San Antonio Spurs. Miller was inserted into the last 4 games of the Finals to help space the floor, and scored 8 points in game 6 as the Heat barely squeaked out a victory. One highlight of the game was a three-pointer he made while wearing one shoe. The Heat won the series in game 7 on June 20, 2013, giving Miller his second championship.

On July 16, 2013, Miller was waived by the Miami Heat via the amnesty clause.

=== Return to Memphis (2013–2014) ===
On July 30, 2013, Miller signed with the Memphis Grizzlies. He saw his minutes and his importance increase with the slightly revamped Grizzlies team led by the new coach Dave Joerger. Miller played steadily for much of the season, finishing off as the only Grizzly to play all 82 regular season games and all 7 playoff games.

=== Cleveland Cavaliers (2014–2015) ===
On August 5, 2014, Miller signed a two-year, $5.5 million contract with the Cleveland Cavaliers. In Cleveland, he reunited with former Miami Heat teammates LeBron James and James Jones, and former Minnesota Timberwolves teammate Kevin Love. After averaging just 1.5 points in 12 minutes per game over the first 24 games of the season, Miller made his first start for the Cavaliers on December 19, 2014, against the Brooklyn Nets as he scored 21 points on 7-of-8 three-pointers in the 95–91 win. The Cavaliers made it to the 2015 NBA Finals, but they lost to the Golden State Warriors in six games.

On June 30, 2015, Miller exercised his player option with the Cavaliers for the 2016 season.

On July 27, 2015, Miller was traded, along with Brendan Haywood and two future second-round draft picks, to the Portland Trail Blazers in exchange for cash considerations. On September 28, 2015, he was waived by the Trail Blazers via a contract buyout.

=== Denver Nuggets (2015–2017) ===
On September 30, 2015, Miller signed with the Denver Nuggets. Miller was instrumental in the early development of teammate Nikola Jokić. The two players share a special friendship to go along with their mentor/mentee relationship and even share the same birthday. He re-signed with the Nuggets on July 21, 2016 on a two-year, $5 million contract.

Miller's final NBA game was played on April 12, 2017, in a 111–105 victory over the Oklahoma City Thunder where he recorded 8 rebounds and 4 assists, but no points. He was waived by the Denver Nuggets on July 11, 2017.

== Coaching career ==
On April 12, 2018, Miller was hired as an assistant coach under Penny Hardaway at the University of Memphis. He spent two seasons with the Tigers and established himself as one of the top recruiters in the nation. On June 3, 2020, Miller resigned to spend time with his family. In July, Miller was named the boys basketball coach at Houston High School in Germantown, Tennessee. Miller led Houston to the Class AAA State title in his lone season as head coach. His sons Mason and Mavrick were players on the team.

== Personal life ==
Miller and his wife, Jen, have three children: sons Mason and Mavrick, and a daughter Jaelyn. His daughter was born during the Heat's appearance in the 2011 Eastern Conference Finals with a serious health issue stemming from pregnancy complications; he spent the first several days of his daughter's life shuttling between practices, games, and the hospital.

He once owned a Java macaque named Sonny. He often tells the story in which his monkey escaped from his room: "You would always put him in his room, and then we'd lock the door, and then we'd put the dogs out, and then we'd lock the front door. Well, he found out how to unlock doors, unlocked his door, went downstairs, let the dogs in the house and opened the front door. About an hour later we got a call from our neighbors, saying, 'Your monkey is riding your dogs around the neighborhood.' ... I said, 'C'mon y'all, y'all got to get in the house."

=== Let It Fly Energy ===
In 2012, Miller founded the Let It Fly Energy line of energy drinks and energy shots. In a 2012 Forbes article, he said he started the company because he wanted a healthy alternative energy drink for athletes.

== Career statistics ==
Legend
GP	Games played	GS	Games started	MPG	Minutes per game
FG%	Field goal percentage	3P%	3-point field goal percentage	FT%	Free throw percentage
RPG	Rebounds per game	APG	Assists per game	SPG	Steals per game
BPG	Blocks per game	PPG	Points per game	**Bold**	Career high
†	Won an NBA championship

=== College ===
Year	Team	GP	GS	MPG	FG%	3P%	FT%	RPG	APG	SPG	BPG	PPG
1998–99	Florida	28	19	24.2	**.494**	**.356**	.702	5.2	2.1	**1.3**	.3	12.2
1999–2000	Florida	**37**	**37**	**28.6**	.476	.338	**.729**	**6.6**	**2.5**	1.2	**.4**	**14.1**
Career		65	56	26.7	.483	.345	.718	6.0	2.3	1.2	.3	13.3

=== NBA ===
==== Regular season ====
Year	Team	GP	GS	MPG	FG%	3P%	FT%	RPG	APG	SPG	BPG	PPG
2000–01	Orlando	**82**	62	29.1	.436	.407	.711	4.0	1.7	.6	.2	11.9
2001–02	Orlando	63	53	33.7	.438	.383	.762	4.3	3.1	.7	**.4**	15.2
2002–03	Orlando	49	39	37.3	.418	.340	.847	5.8	2.8	.7	.3	16.4
2002–03	Memphis	16	13	22.5	**.510**	**.500**	.806	3.4	1.9	.4	.3	12.8
2003–04	Memphis	65	65	27.2	.438	.372	.723	3.3	3.6	**.9**	.2	11.1
2004–05	Memphis	76	51	30.0	.505	.433	.720	3.9	2.9	.7	.3	13.4
2005–06	Memphis	74	9	30.6	.466	.407	.800	5.4	2.7	.7	**.4**	13.7
2006–07	Memphis	70	69	**39.1**	.460	.406	.793	5.4	4.3	.8	.3	**18.5**
2007–08	Memphis	70	**70**	35.3	.502	.432	.774	**6.7**	3.4	.5	.2	16.4
2008–09	Minnesota	73	47	32.3	.482	.378	.732	6.6	**4.5**	.4	**.4**	9.9
2009–10	Washington	54	50	33.4	.501	.480	.824	6.2	3.9	.7	.2	10.9
2010–11	Miami	41	2	20.4	.401	.364	.676	4.5	1.2	.5	.0	5.6
2011–12†	Miami	39	2	19.3	.435	.453	.400	3.3	1.1	.4	.2	6.1
2012–13†	Miami	59	17	15.3	.433	.417	.727	2.7	1.7	.4	.1	4.8
2013–14	Memphis	**82**	4	20.8	.481	.459	.821	2.5	1.6	.3	.1	7.1
2014–15	Cleveland	52	15	13.5	.325	.327	.750	1.8	.9	.3	.1	2.1
2015–16	Denver	47	2	7.9	.355	.365	–	1.1	.9	.3	.1	1.3
2016–17	Denver	20	0	7.6	.391	.400	**1.000**	1.9	1.1	.1	.0	1.4
Career		1,032	570	26.9	.459	.407	.769	4.2	2.6	.6	.2	10.6

==== Playoffs ====
Year	Team	GP	GS	MPG	FG%	3P%	FT%	RPG	APG	SPG	BPG	PPG
2001	Orlando	4	4	**28.0**	.396	.389	.750	**4.5**	1.8	.0	**.8**	**12.0**
2002	Orlando	4	1	18.0	.333	.125	**1.000**	1.3	1.3	1.0	.0	4.8
2004	Memphis	4	4	24.5	.353	.385	.333	3.0	.8	**1.3**	.0	7.5
2005	Memphis	4	4	27.5	**.486**	**.471**	**1.000**	2.5	**2.8**	.0	**.8**	**12.0**
2006	Memphis	4	1	26.8	.400	.125	**1.000**	3.8	1.8	.5	.5	8.5
2011	Miami	18	0	11.9	.340	.297	—	2.7	.7	.4	.1	2.6
2012†	Miami	**23**	0	16.0	.404	.413	.818	2.5	.7	.4	.1	5.2
2013†	Miami	17	**5**	13.6	.467	.444	—	1.9	.9	.5	.1	3.4
2014	Memphis	7	1	24.7	.357	.483	.778	3.7	1.3	.9	.0	7.3
2015	Cleveland	9	1	7.2	.600	.600	—	1.1	.0	.1	.1	1.0
Career		94	21	16.5	.399	.394	.841	2.5	.9	.4	.1	4.9

== See also ==
- List of Florida Gators in the NBA
- List of National Basketball Association career 3-point scoring leaders
- List of National Basketball Association career 3-point field goal percentage leaders
