= Radial collateral ligament of thumb =

Ligament of the thumb

Radial collateral ligament (thumb)
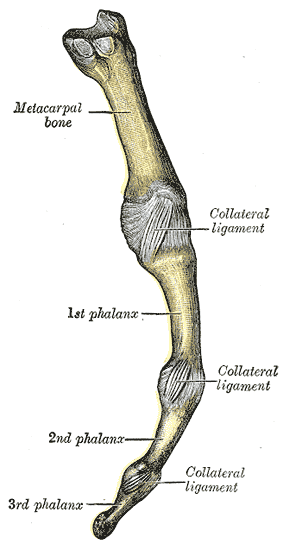
- From: First metacarpal head
- To: Proximal phalanx of the thumb

The radial collateral ligament of the thumb extends from the first metacarpal head to the proximal phalanx of the thumb. It is located on the radial side of the joint and is weaker than the ulnar collateral ligament of the thumb.
