= 2006–07 Boston Celtics season =

Season of National Basketball Association team the Boston Celtics

- Head coach: Doc Rivers
- General manager: Chris Wallace
- Owners: Boston Basketball Partners
- Arena: TD Banknorth Garden

Results
- Record: 24–58 (.293)
- Place: Division: 5th (Atlantic); Conference: 15th (Eastern)
- Playoff finish: Did not qualify
- Stats at Basketball Reference

Local media
- Television: FSN New England
- Radio: WRKO

The 2006–07 Boston Celtics season was the 61st season of the Boston Celtics in the National Basketball Association (NBA). The Celtics finished 24–58, the second-worst in franchise history after the 15–67 record in 1996–97. It was also the second-worst record in the league in 2006–07, only marginally in front of the Memphis Grizzlies. The season was overshadowed by many injuries, in particular the injury to All-Star Paul Pierce, which caused him to miss seven weeks, and the deaths of Celtics legends Red Auerbach and Dennis Johnson.

== Key dates ==
- June 28: The 2006 NBA draft took place in New York City, New York.
- July 1: The free agency period started.
- October 10: The pre-season started with a win against the Cleveland Cavaliers.
- October 28: Red Auerbach died at the age of 89 due to a heart attack.
- November 1: The regular season started with a loss to the New Orleans/Oklahoma City Hornets.
- December 20: Paul Pierce was injured in a loss to the Golden State Warriors.
- January 10: Tony Allen was injured in a loss to the Indiana Pacers, which caused him to miss the rest of the season.
- February 9: Paul Pierce returned from his injury in a loss to the New Jersey Nets.
- February 14: The Celtics ended a franchise record 18-game losing streak with a win against the Milwaukee Bucks.
- February 22: Dennis Johnson died at the age of 52 due to a heart attack.
- April 18: The season concluded with a loss to the Detroit Pistons.

== Summary ==
Just days before the start of the season, the Celtics were dealt an emotional blow when their patriarch Red Auerbach died at the age of 89. When the season started, the days of Auerbach seemed like a distant memory as the Celtics lost six of their first seven games en route to a 5–13 start. In December, the Celtics improved their play as they embarked on a 5-game winning streak. However, after losing All-Star Paul Pierce to a stress reaction in his left foot on December 20, the Celtics crumbled, winning just 3 of their next 42 games, including a franchise record 18-game losing streak that lasted from January 5 to February 14, and plunging into last place. In between the losing streak, the Celtics lost Tony Allen for the remainder of the season, who tore both the ACL and MCL on an uncontested dunk attempt on January 10.

Adding to the pain was the death of another Celtics legend, Dennis Johnson, who suffered a heart attack on February 22 at the age of 52 while coaching the Celtics NBDL affiliate, the Austin Toros. After Pierce had returned in early February after spending 7 weeks on the injured list, the Celtics played better and won 5 of 6 games in late February and early March. A few weeks later on St. Patrick's Day, the Celtics stunned the eventual NBA champions San Antonio Spurs 91–85 on the road, making it the first time the Celtics won against Tim Duncan, whom they missed out on during the 1997 Draft Lottery.

But nagging injuries would continue to hamper Pierce, who sat out all of April, as the Celtics finished with a horrible 24–58 record that earned them the worst record in the Eastern Conference and 2nd worst record in the league, only marginally in front of the Memphis Grizzlies. Afterwards, the Celtics turned their focus to the draft lottery, where they had good chances of landing a Top 2 pick, allowing them to select either Greg Oden or Kevin Durant. However, even the draft lottery came out all wrong for the Celtics as they were assigned the 5th overall selection, which seemed to guarantee another disappointing season.

== Draft picks ==
Round	Pick	Player	Position	Nationality	College
1	7	Randy Foye (traded to Portland)	SG	United States	Villanova

== Roster ==
2006–07 Boston Celtics roster
Players

Pos.	No.	Player	Height	Weight	DOB	From
SG	42	Tony Allen	6 ft 4 in (1.93 m)	213 lb (97 kg)	1982–01–11	Oklahoma State
PF	4	Ryan Gomes	6 ft 7 in (2.01 m)	250 lb (113 kg)	1982–09–01	Providence
SG	5	Gerald Green	6 ft 8 in (2.03 m)	200 lb (91 kg)	1986–01–26	Gulf Shores Academy (TX)
C	7	Al Jefferson	6 ft 10 in (2.08 m)	256 lb (116 kg)	1985–01–04	Prentiss HS (MS)
C	41	Michael Olowokandi	7 ft 0 in (2.13 m)	270 lb (122 kg)	1975–04–03	Pacific
C	43	Kendrick Perkins	6 ft 10 in (2.08 m)	280 lb (127 kg)	1984–11–10	Clifton J. Ozen HS (TX)
SF	34	Paul Pierce	6 ft 6 in (1.98 m)	230 lb (104 kg)	1977–10–13	Kansas
PF	51	Kevinn Pinkney	6 ft 10 in (2.08 m)	245 lb (111 kg)	1983–10–20	Nevada
PF	0	Leon Powe	6 ft 8 in (2.03 m)	240 lb (109 kg)	1984–01–22	California
C	50	Theo Ratliff	6 ft 10 in (2.08 m)	235 lb (107 kg)	1973–04–17	Wyoming
SG	12	Allan Ray	6 ft 2 in (1.88 m)	190 lb (86 kg)	1984–06–17	Villanova
PG	9	Rajon Rondo	6 ft 1 in (1.85 m)	171 lb (78 kg)	1986–02–22	Kentucky
PF	44	Brian Scalabrine	6 ft 9 in (2.06 m)	235 lb (107 kg)	1978–03–18	USC
PF	55	Wally Szczerbiak	6 ft 7 in (2.01 m)	244 lb (111 kg)	1977–03–05	Miami (OH)
PG	30	Sebastian Telfair	6 ft 0 in (1.83 m)	160 lb (73 kg)	1985–06–09	Lincoln HS (NY)
PG	13	Delonte West	6 ft 4 in (1.93 m)	180 lb (82 kg)	1983–07–26	Saint Joseph's

Coaches
Head coach
- Doc Rivers
Assistant(s)
- Tony Brown
- Kevin Eastman
- Armond Hill
- Clifford Ray
- Dave Wohl

Legend
- (DP) Unsigned draft pick
- (FA) Free agent
- (S) Suspended
- Injured

Roster
Updated: 2007-04-14

== Regular season ==
=== Standings ===
Atlantic Division	W	L	PCT	GB	Home	Road	Div
y-Toronto Raptors	47	35	.573	-	30–11	17–24	11–5
x-New Jersey Nets	41	41	.500	6	24–17	17–24	10–6
Philadelphia 76ers	35	47	.427	12	21–20	14–27	9–7
New York Knicks	33	49	.402	14	19–22	14–27	3–13
Boston Celtics	24	58	.293	23	12–29	12–29	7–9

#	Eastern Conference				
#	Team	W	L	PCT	GB
1	c-Detroit Pistons	53	29	.646	–
2	x-Cleveland Cavaliers	50	32	.610	3
3	y-Toronto Raptors	47	35	.573	6
4	y-Miami Heat	44	38	.537	9
5	x-Chicago Bulls	49	33	.598	4
6	x-New Jersey Nets	41	41	.500	12
7	x-Washington Wizards	41	41	.500	12
8	x-Orlando Magic	40	42	.488	13
9	Philadelphia 76ers	35	47	.427	18
10	Indiana Pacers	35	47	.427	18
11	New York Knicks	33	49	.402	20
12	Charlotte Bobcats	33	49	.402	20
13	Atlanta Hawks	30	52	.366	23
14	Milwaukee Bucks	28	54	.341	25
15	Boston Celtics	24	58	.293	29

== Player statistics ==
Legend
GP	Games played	GS	Games started	MPG	Minutes per game
FG%	Field-goal percentage	3P%	3-point field-goal percentage	FT%	Free-throw percentage
RPG	Rebounds per game	APG	Assists per game	SPG	Steals per game
BPG	Blocks per game	PPG	Points per game

=== Regular season ===
Boston Celtics statistics
Player	GP	GS	MPG	FG%	3P%	FT%	RPG	APG	SPG	BPG	PPG
Tony Allen	33	18	24.4	.514	.242	.784	3.8	1.7	1.5	.4	11.5
Ryan Gomes	73	60	31.2	.467	.381	.811	5.6	1.6	.7	.2	12.1
Gerald Green	81	26	22.0	.419	.368	.805	2.6	1.0	.5	.3	10.4
Al Jefferson	69	60	33.6	.514	.000	.681	11.0	1.3	.7	1.5	16.0
Michael Olowokandi	24	0	9.8	.413	.	.667	2.0	.2	.3	.5	1.7
Kendrick Perkins	72	53	21.9	.491	.000	.600	5.2	1.3	.3	1.3	4.5
Paul Pierce	47	46	37.0	.439	.389	.796	5.9	4.1	1.0	.3	25.0
Kevinn Pinkney	6	0	16.7	.444	.500	.667	2.5	.8	.5	.5	5.2
Leon Powe	63	2	11.4	.446	.000	.736	3.4	.2	.2	.3	4.2
Theo Ratliff	2	2	22.0	.333	.	.750	3.5	.0	.5	1.5	2.5
Allan Ray	47	5	15.1	.386	.414	.764	1.5	.9	.4	.1	6.2
Rajon Rondo	78	25	23.5	.418	.207	.647	3.7	3.8	1.6	.1	6.4
Brian Scalabrine	54	17	19.0	.403	.400	.783	1.9	1.1	.4	.3	4.0
Wally Szczerbiak	32	19	28.1	.415	.415	.897	3.1	1.7	.6	.1	15.0
Sebastian Telfair	78	30	20.2	.371	.289	.818	1.4	2.8	.6	.1	6.1
Delonte West	69	47	32.2	.427	.365	.853	3.0	4.4	1.1	.5	12.2

== Transactions ==
=== Trades ===
June 28, 2006	To Boston Celtics Theo Ratliff, Sebastian Telfair and 2008 2nd-round pick	To Portland Trail Blazers Dan Dickau, Raef LaFrentz, and the 7th pick in the 2006 NBA draft (Randy Foye)

June 28, 2006	To Boston Celtics Brian Grant, and the 21st pick in the 2006 NBA draft (Rajon Rondo)	To Phoenix Suns Future 1st-round pick

June 28, 2006	To Boston Celtics The 49th pick in the 2006 NBA draft (Leon Powe)	To Denver Nuggets Future 2nd-round pick

October 13, 2006	To Boston Celtics Luke Jackson, and cash considerations	To Cleveland Cavaliers Dwayne Jones

=== Free agents ===
==== Additions ====
Player	Signed	Former team
Allan Ray	July 6	Miami Heat
Kevin Pittsnogle	July 26	West Virginia Mountaineers
Michael Olowokandi	October 2	Houston Rockets
Kevinn Pinkney	April 4	Bakersfield Jam

==== Subtractions ====
Player	Left	New team
Orien Greene	June 30	Boston Celtics
Kevin Pittsnogle	October 20	Pittsburgh Xplosion
Luke Jackson	October 26	Seattle SuperSonics
Brian Grant	October 26	Chicago Bulls
Kevinn Pinkney	April 18	Pallacanestro Biella

== See also ==
- 2006–07 NBA season
