= Juan Dixon =

American basketball player and coach (born 1978)

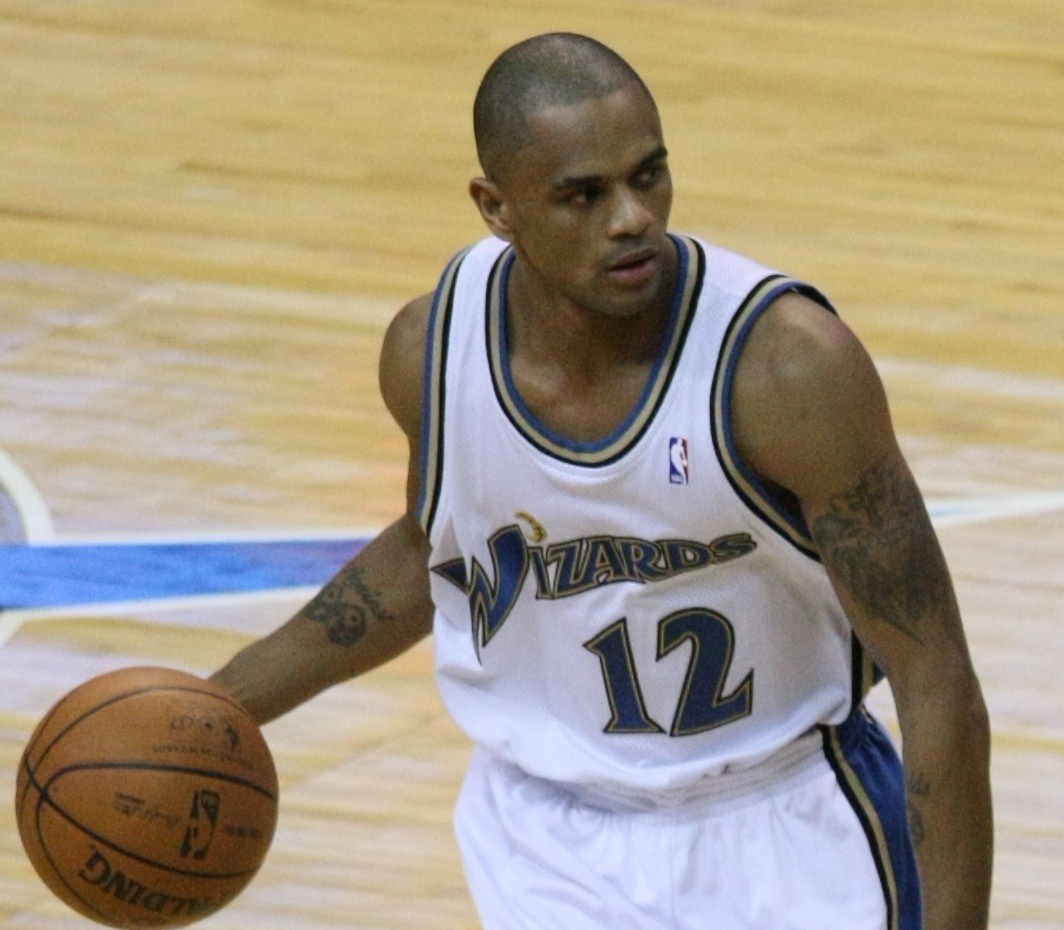
- Dixon with the Washington Wizards in 2008

Personal information
- Born: October 9, 1978 (age 48) Baltimore, Maryland, U.S.
- Listed height: 6 ft 3 in (1.91 m)
- Listed weight: 165 lb (75 kg)

Career information
- High school: Calvert Hall (Towson, Maryland)
- College: Maryland (1998–2002)
- NBA draft: 2002: 1st round, 17th overall pick
- Drafted by: Washington Wizards
- Playing career: 2002–2011
- Position: Point guard / shooting guard
- Number: 3, 8, 12
- Coaching career: 2016–present

Career history

Playing
- 2002–2005: Washington Wizards
- 2005–2007: Portland Trail Blazers
- 2007–2008: Toronto Raptors
- 2008: Detroit Pistons
- 2008–2009: Washington Wizards
- 2009: Aris Thessaloniki
- 2009–2010: Unicaja Málaga
- 2011: Bandırma Banvit

Career highlights
- As player: NCAA champion (2002); NCAA Final Four Most Outstanding Player (2002); Consensus first-team All-American (2002); Third-team All-American – NABC (2001); Senior CLASS Award (2002); Chip Hilton Player of the Year (2002); ACC Player of the Year (2002); ACC Athlete of the Year (2002); 3× First-team All-ACC (2000–2002); As coach: MEAC North division champion (2021)
- Stats at NBA.com
- Stats at Basketball Reference
Medals
Men's basketball
Representing United States
Summer Universiade
Bronze medal – third place	2001 Beijing	Team competition

Juan Max Dixon (born October 9, 1978) is an American former professional basketball player and former head coach for Coppin State University in Baltimore. Dixon led the Maryland Terrapins to their first NCAA championship in 2002 and earned Most Outstanding Player honors at the 2002 Final Four.

== Early life ==
Dixon was born in Baltimore, Maryland, where he attended Lake Clifton High School as a freshman. He then attended and played basketball at Calvert Hall, a high school in Towson, Maryland. While at Calvert Hall, he scored 1,590 career points under the tutelage of head coach Mark Amatucci.

Both his mother, Juanita, and father, Phil, were addicted to heroin, and died of AIDS-related illnesses before Dixon was 17 years old. He was then raised by his grandparents Roberta and Warnick Graves in Baltimore.

Dixon's aunt, Sheila Dixon, was the mayor of Baltimore. Dixon's half brother is Jermaine Dixon, who played shooting guard for the University of Pittsburgh Panthers basketball team. His second cousin Brandon Driver played cornerback for the San Jose State Spartans football team. In 2016, Juan Dixon discovered that Phil Dixon was not his biological father, and that his biological father Bruce Flanigan was still alive. Flanigan had an affair with Juanita Dixon while she was separated from Phil, and a blood test confirmed his paternity. Dixon and Flanigan reconnected and became good friends.

=== Personal life ===
Dating since 1996, Dixon married his high-school sweetheart, Robyn Bragg, in July 2005. She works in the public relations field and was a cast member in the Bravo reality television show The Real Housewives of Potomac from 2016 to 2024. They have two sons, Corey (b. 2008) and Carter (b. 2010). The two divorced in March 2012 but still lived together in Maryland after their divorce. In August 2022, the couple remarried.

== Playing career ==
=== College ===
Dixon arrived at the University of Maryland, College Park after head coach Gary Williams inadvertently discovered him at an AAU tournament in Georgia. Williams watched as Dixon dove for the ball down 20 points with two minutes to go. Williams was impressed by the effort.

Dixon played in 34 games his freshman year and averaged 7.4 points per game. He made improvements in his sophomore year as he averaged 18 points per game and was selected to the 1999–2000 All-ACC team.

Both Dixon and the Terps entered the 2000–01 season with high expectations. The Terps began ranked in the top ten in most major polls while Dixon was a candidate for the Naismith Award Player of the Year award and the Wooden Award Player of the Year award. Dixon helped lead the Terps to their first ever Final Four appearance where the team lost to Duke. Dixon ended the season averaging 18.2 points per game and was again elected to the All-ACC first team.

Maryland began the 2001–02 season ranked #2 in ESPN/USA Today Coaches' poll. Dixon led the Terps to a 32–4 record and the school's first ever National Championship. He was voted to All-ACC team and was also a first team All-American. He was also recognized as one of the nation's best college players and was honored as the 2002 ACC Men's Basketball Player of the Year and ACC Athlete of the Year.

He became Maryland men's basketball's all-time leading scorer when he scored 29 points against Wisconsin to help Maryland advance to the Sweet Sixteen, passing Len Bias (2,149 points). He also became the only player in NCAA history to accumulate 2,000 points, 300 steals and 200 three-point field goals. In addition to leaving Maryland as the highest-scoring men's player, Dixon also left as the school's all-time men's leader in three-pointers made (239) and attempted (615). He is second on Maryland's all-time steals list with 333 and third in free-throw percentage (.850). Dixon also stands as Maryland's all-time NCAA Tournament scoring leader with 294. Upon completion of his career, Dixon's #3 jersey was honored and now hangs in the Xfinity Center. In 2002, Juan Dixon was honored as a part of the ACC 50th Anniversary men's basketball team, one of only 8 Terrapins selected to the 50-man team. After his senior season, Dixon was featured on the cover of a video game, NCAA Final Four 2003.

=== NBA ===
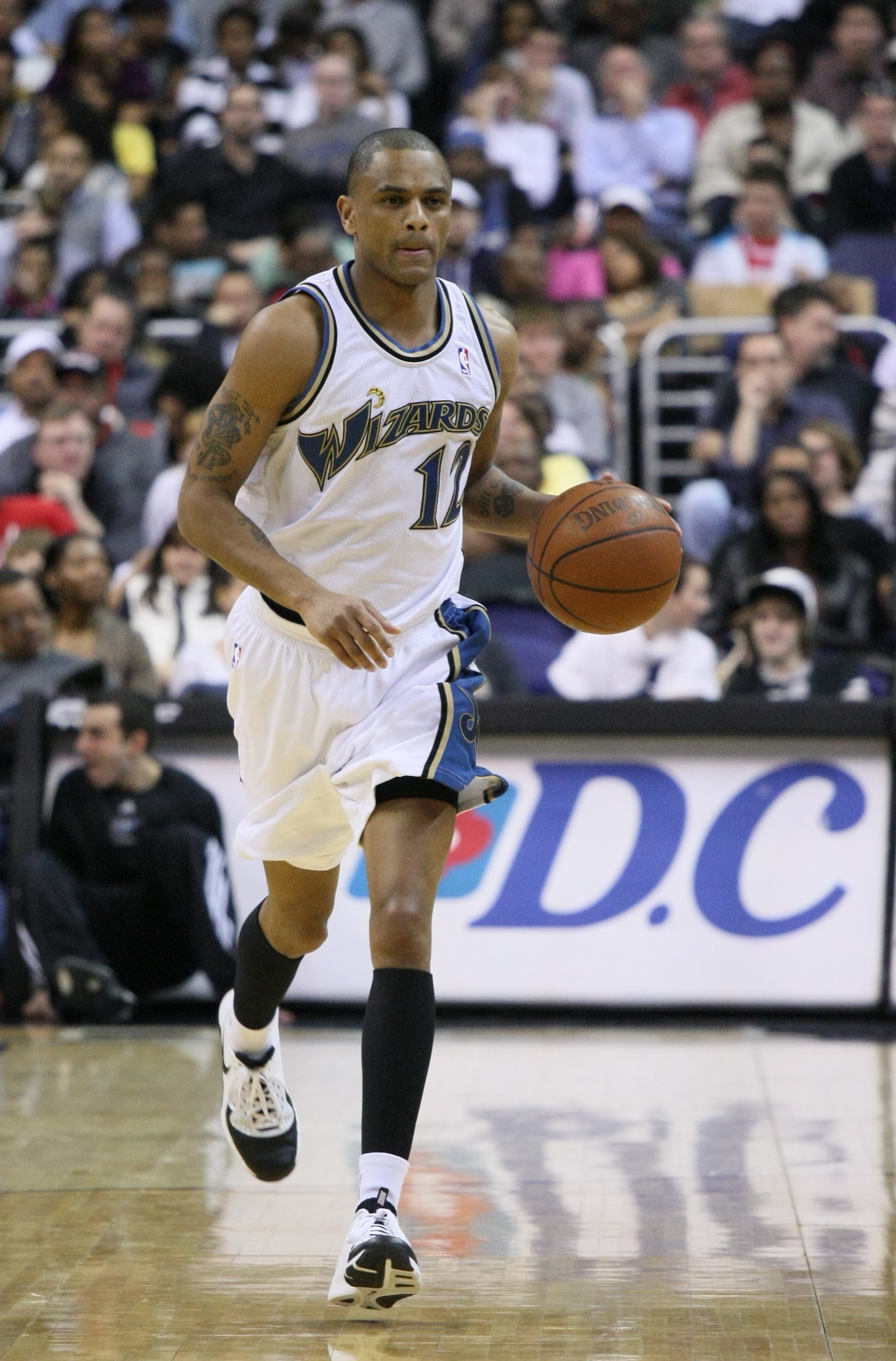
Dixon as a member of the Washington Wizards.

Dixon was drafted 17th overall by the Washington Wizards in the 2002 NBA draft. He spent the first three years of his NBA career with the Wizards. In his third season in Washington (2004–05), he averaged eight points per game, including a career-high 35 points in Game 4 of the Eastern Conference Quarterfinals against the Chicago Bulls. Dixon signed as a free agent with the Portland Trail Blazers during the summer of 2005. Soon after, his Wizards and Terrapins teammate and friend Steve Blake signed with Portland as well. In his first game back in D.C., Dixon was given a standing ovation from the Verizon Center crowd upon coming off the bench towards the end of the first quarter. In Dixon's first year with the Blazers, he started 42 times and played in 76 games. In his last year with the Wizards, he only started four games and played in 63. He also increased his, assists, and shooting percentage considerably in Portland. However, he was later traded at the 2007 NBA trade deadline to Toronto for Fred Jones and future considerations.

On the 2008 NBA trade deadline, February 21, 2008, Dixon was traded from the Toronto Raptors to the Detroit Pistons in exchange for center Primož Brezec and cash considerations.

On September 24, 2008, the Washington Wizards signed Dixon to a partially guaranteed one-year deal for $1.03 million, the veterans' minimum for a player with Dixon's experience.

Dixon's final NBA game was on April 15, 2009, in a 107–115 loss to the Boston Celtics where he recorded 3 points, 1 rebound, 2 assists and 2 steals. On September 28, 2009, Juan Dixon signed a contract with the Atlanta Hawks. He was waived October 20, 2009.

=== Europe ===
On November 1, 2009, Dixon signed with Aris Thessaloniki of the Greek A1 League. The next season, he joined Unicaja Málaga of Spain. In February 2010, he was suspended indefinitely by FIBA after testing positive for steroids. In March 2011, he signed with Bandırma Banvit in Turkey. He played one season before entering the coaching profession.

== Coaching career ==
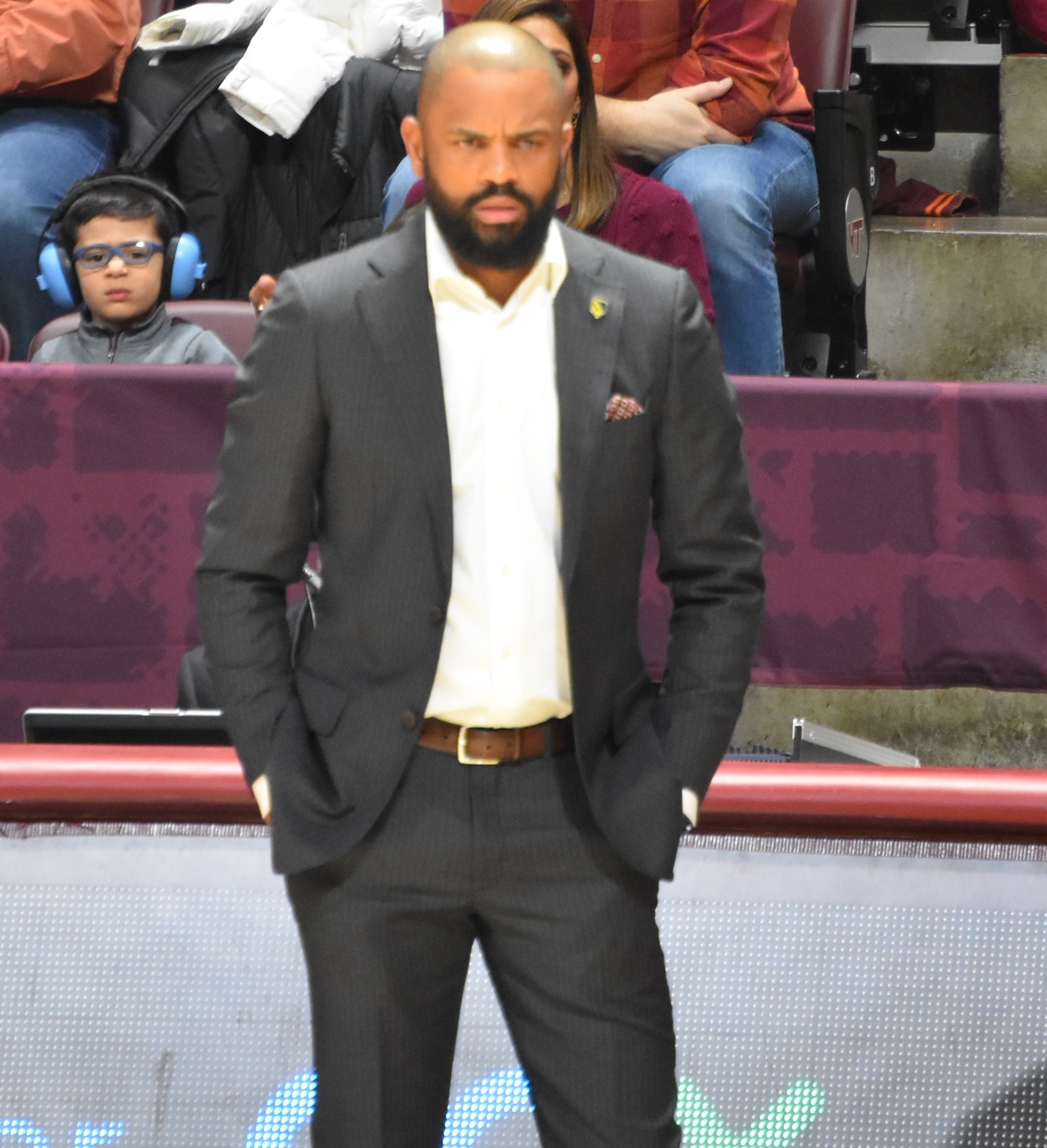
Dixon coaching Coppin State

On November 27, 2013, Dixon joined the Maryland Terrapin coaching staff as a special assistant under head coach Mark Turgeon. In July 2016, Dixon was relieved of his duties.

On October 14, 2016, Dixon was hired as head coach of the women's basketball team at the University of the District of Columbia (UDC). After a 3–25 season, he was hired as men's head coach at Coppin State. After 6 seasons earning only 51 wins as a division one head coach, he was fired in March 2023.

In the summer of 2025, Dixon was named the head coach of Maryland's alumni basketball team, Shell Shock, in The Basketball Tournament. Behind Dixon's leadership, Shell Shock won the James Madison Regional and advanced to the Elite Eight, before losing to Best Virginia, West Virginia's alumni team.

== Head coaching record ==
=== Women's ===
Record table
Season	Team	Overall	Conference	Standing	Postseason
District of Columbia (East Coast Conference) (2016–2017)
2016–17	District of Columbia	3–25	2–16	10th	
District of Columbia:		3–25 (.107)	2–16 (.111)		
Total:		3–25 (.107)			
National champion Postseason invitational champion Conference regular season champion Conference regular season and conference tournament champion Division regular season champion Division regular season and conference tournament champion Conference tournament champion

=== Men's ===
Record table
Season	Team	Overall	Conference	Standing	Postseason
Coppin State (MEAC) (2017–2023)
2017–18	Coppin State	5–27	5–11	11th	
2018–19	Coppin State	8–25	7–9	8th	
2019–20	Coppin State	11–20	7–9	7th	
2020–21	Coppin State	9–13	8–4	T–1st (Northern)	
2021–22	Coppin State	9–23	6–8	7th	
2022–23	Coppin State	9–23	4–10	T–6th	
Coppin State:		51–131 (.280)	37–51 (.420)		
Total:		51–131 (.280)			
National champion Postseason invitational champion Conference regular season champion Conference regular season and conference tournament champion Division regular season champion Division regular season and conference tournament champion Conference tournament champion

== Career statistics ==
=== College ===
Season Averages
Season	Team	G	MIN	PPG	PTS	RPG	REB	APG	AST	STL	BLK	FG%	3P%	FT%
1998–99	Maryland Terrapins	34	14.9	7.4	250	2.6	88	1.4	47	47	1	.443	.371	.830
1999–00	Maryland Terrapins	35	34.0	18.0	630	5.5	192	3.6	127	96	11	.462	.363	.865
2000–01	Maryland Terrapins	36	30.5	18.2	654	4.3	153	2.6	93	95	8	.483	.411	.865
2001–02	Maryland Terrapins	36	33.6	20.4	735	4.6	166	2.9	104	89	7	.469	.397	.898
Totals:		141	28.4	16.1	2269	4.2	599	2.6	371	327	27	.468	.389	.850

=== NBA ===
Legend
GP	Games played	GS	Games started	MPG	Minutes per game
FG%	Field goal percentage	3P%	3-point field goal percentage	FT%	Free throw percentage
RPG	Rebounds per game	APG	Assists per game	SPG	Steals per game
BPG	Blocks per game	PPG	Points per game	**Bold**	Career high

==== Regular season ====
Year	Team	GP	GS	MPG	FG%	3P%	FT%	RPG	APG	SPG	BPG	PPG
2002–03	Washington	42	3	15.4	.384	.298	.804	1.7	1.0	.6	**.1**	6.4
2003–04	Washington	71	16	20.8	.388	.298	.799	2.1	1.9	**1.2**	**.1**	9.4
2004–05	Washington	63	4	16.7	.416	.327	.897	1.9	1.8	.7	**.1**	8.0
2005–06	Portland	**76**	**42**	25.3	.435	.382	.804	2.3	2.0	.8	**.1**	**12.3**
2006–07	Portland	55	1	22.6	.426	.364	.833	1.5	1.5	.9	**.1**	8.9
2006–07	Toronto	26	5	**26.3**	.425	.325	.932	**2.8**	1.6	1.0	**.1**	11.1
2007–08	Toronto	36	0	11.8	.369	**.436**	**.947**	1.3	1.8	.6	**.1**	4.3
2007–08	Detroit	17	0	14.4	**.480**	.394	.429	1.6	1.9	.0	.0	6.5
2008–09	Washington	50	6	16.3	.395	.333	.872	1.3	**2.4**	.7	**.1**	5.2
Career		436	77	19.5	.413	.341	.833	1.9	1.8	.8	.1	8.4

==== Playoffs ====
Year	Team	GP	GS	MPG	FG%	3P%	FT%	RPG	APG	SPG	BPG	PPG
2005	Washington	**10**	0	**21.9**	**.406**	**.324**	**.840**	**2.6**	**1.3**	.7	.0	**11.4**
2007	Toronto	6	0	10.5	.381	.250	.000	.7	.5	**1.2**	.0	3.0
2008	Detroit	2	0	3.5	.000	.000	.000	.0	.0	.0	.0	.0
Career		18	0	16.1	.395	.310	.840	1.7	.9	.8	.0	7.3

== See also ==
- List of NCAA Division I men's basketball career steals leaders
