= 2006–07 Indiana Pacers season =

NBA professional basketball team season

- Head coach: Rick Carlisle
- General manager: Larry Bird
- Owner: Herbert Simon
- Arena: Conseco Fieldhouse

Results
- Record: 35–47 (.427)
- Place: Division: 4th (Central); Conference: 10th (Eastern)
- Playoff finish: Did not qualify
- Stats at Basketball Reference

Local media
- Television: FSN Indiana
- Radio: WIBC

The 2006–07 Indiana Pacers season was Indiana's 31st season in the NBA and 40th season as a franchise. They began the season hoping to improve upon their 41–41 output from the previous season. However, they came six wins shy of tying it, finishing 35–47. The Pacers would miss the playoffs for the first time since 1997.

== Draft Selections ==
Round	Pick	Player	Position	Nationality	School/Club team
1	17	Shawne Williams	F	United States	Memphis
2	45	Alexander Johnson	F	United States	Florida St.

== Season summary ==
During the Summer of 2006, the Pacers lost Peja Stojakovic, whom they had just acquired in a trade from the Sacramento Kings during the previous season, in free agency to the New Orleans Hornets. Because of this, they were granted a trade exception by the NBA, which they used to re-acquire former Pacer Al Harrington from the Atlanta Hawks. They also pulled off two separate trades with the Dallas Mavericks, giving up established veterans Anthony Johnson and Austin Croshere for unexplained reasons. These two trades were disappointing to Pacers fans, who were confused by the trades and saw them as one-sided in the favor of the Mavericks. In June 2006, once-promising talent Jonathan Bender announced that he was retiring from the NBA at the age of 25, due to his struggles with knee injuries. The Pacers had traded All-Star big man Antonio Davis to acquire Bender in 1999 when he was an 18-year-old rookie with great potential, but his constant injuries had prevented him from ever developing.

When the regular season finally started, the Pacers had a significantly different roster than they did at the end of the previous season. The Pacers hovered around the .500 mark for most of the season, and were a borderline playoff team. In January 2007, the Pacers pulled off another major trade, this time with the Golden State Warriors, giving up troubled swingman Stephen Jackson, Al Harrington, and other pieces for versatile big man Troy Murphy and unproven swingman Mike Dunleavy Jr. as well as some other pieces. This trade was perceived as the only way for the Pacers to finally part ways with Jackson, who had lost the respect of Pacers fans due to his involvement in "The Brawl" and in a shooting at an Indianapolis nightclub. After the trade, the Pacers fell downward in the standings, marked by an 11-game losing streak which stretched from late February to mid-March, and eventually were eliminated from qualification for the 2007 NBA Playoffs. This would be the first time the Pacers missed the playoffs since the 1996-97 season, and the first of a streak of four seasons of missing the playoffs. Ironically, the perennial basement-dweller Warriors wound up making the playoffs for the first time since the 1993-94 season, and even advanced to the second round by upsetting the first-seeded Mavericks 4–2 in the first round. This left the dwindling community of Pacers fans with a sour taste in their mouths as they wondered how far the team might have gone if the trade in January had not occurred. Thus, coach Rick Carlisle was fired at the conclusion of the Pacers' season in April, and it was announced in May that Jim O'Brien, former head coach of the Boston Celtics and Philadelphia 76ers, would replace him as the Pacers' head coach for the next season.

== Regular season ==
=== Season standings ===
Central Division	W	L	PCT	GB	Home	Road	Div
y-Detroit Pistons	53	29	.646	-	26–15	27–14	9–7
x-Cleveland Cavaliers	50	32	.610	3	30–11	20–21	10–6
x-Chicago Bulls	49	33	.598	4	31–10	18–23	12–4
Indiana Pacers	35	47	.427	18	22–19	13–28	8–8
Milwaukee Bucks	28	54	.341	25	18–23	10–31	1–15

#	Eastern Conference				
#	Team	W	L	PCT	GB
1	c-Detroit Pistons	53	29	.646	–
2	x-Cleveland Cavaliers	50	32	.610	3
3	y-Toronto Raptors	47	35	.573	6
4	y-Miami Heat	44	38	.537	9
5	x-Chicago Bulls	49	33	.598	4
6	x-New Jersey Nets	41	41	.500	12
7	x-Washington Wizards	41	41	.500	12
8	x-Orlando Magic	40	42	.488	13
9	Philadelphia 76ers	35	47	.427	18
10	Indiana Pacers	35	47	.427	18
11	New York Knicks	33	49	.402	20
12	Charlotte Bobcats	33	49	.402	20
13	Atlanta Hawks	30	52	.366	23
14	Milwaukee Bucks	28	54	.341	25
15	Boston Celtics	24	58	.293	29

== Roster ==
2006–07 Indiana Pacers roster
Players

Pos.	No.	Player	Height	Weight	DOB	From
PG	24	Darrell Armstrong	6 ft 0 in (1.83 m)	170 lb (77 kg)		Fayetteville State
PF	9	Maceo Baston	6 ft 9 in (2.06 m)	215 lb (98 kg)		Michigan
SG	6	Marquis Daniels	6 ft 6 in (1.98 m)	200 lb (91 kg)		Auburn
F	1	Ike Diogu	6 ft 8 in (2.03 m)	255 lb (116 kg)		Arizona State
SF	17	Mike Dunleavy Jr.	6 ft 9 in (2.06 m)	230 lb (104 kg)		Duke
F/C	10	Jeff Foster	6 ft 11 in (2.11 m)	250 lb (113 kg)		Texas State
SF	33	Danny Granger	6 ft 9 in (2.06 m)	228 lb (103 kg)		New Mexico
SG	5	Orien Greene	6 ft 4 in (1.93 m)	208 lb (94 kg)		Louisiana
F	32	Al Harrington (to GSW)	6 ft 9 in (2.06 m)	230 lb (104 kg)		St. Patrick HS (NJ)
C	13	David Harrison	7 ft 0 in (2.13 m)	280 lb (127 kg)		Colorado
F	1	Stephen Jackson (to GSW)	6 ft 8 in (2.03 m)	218 lb (99 kg)		Butler CC
SG	3	Šarūnas Jasikevičius (to GSW)	6 ft 4 in (1.93 m)	195 lb (88 kg)		Maryland
SF	2	Rawle Marshall	6 ft 9 in (2.06 m)	190 lb (86 kg)		Oakland
PG	20	Keith McLeod	6 ft 2 in (1.88 m)	188 lb (85 kg)		Bowling Green
PF	3	Troy Murphy	6 ft 11 in (2.11 m)	245 lb (111 kg)		Notre Dame
F/C	7	Jermaine O'Neal	6 ft 11 in (2.11 m)	260 lb (118 kg)		Eau Claire HS (SC)
F/C	22	Josh Powell (to GSW)	6 ft 9 in (2.06 m)	225 lb (102 kg)		NC State
PG	11	Jamaal Tinsley	6 ft 3 in (1.91 m)	185 lb (84 kg)		Iowa State
F	4	Shawne Williams	6 ft 9 in (2.06 m)	225 lb (102 kg)		Memphis

Coaches
Head coach
- Jim O'Brien (Saint Joseph's)
Assistant(s)
- Dick Harter (Penn)
- Lester Conner (Oregon State)
- Dan Burke (Portland State)
- Frank Vogel (Kentucky)
- Jay DeFruscio (Ursinus)

Legend
- (DP) Unsigned draft pick
- (FA) Free agent
- (S) Suspended
- Injured

Roster
Updated: 2008-03-01

== Player statistics ==
=== Ragular season ===
Player	POS	GP	GS	MP	REB	AST	STL	BLK	PTS	MPG	RPG	APG	SPG	BPG	PPG
Danny Granger	SF	82	57	2,785	381	114	67	61	1,142	34.0	4.6	1.4	.8	.7	13.9
Darrell Armstrong	PG	81	4	1,275	135	191	70	6	457	15.7	1.7	2.4	.9	.1	5.6
Jeff Foster	C	75	43	1,740	609	57	62	37	322	23.2	8.1	.8	.8	.5	4.3
Jamaal Tinsley	PG	72	72	2,243	240	494	117	25	925	31.2	3.3	6.9	1.6	.3	12.8
Jermaine O'Neal	C	69	69	2,459	661	167	50	182	1,339	35.6	9.6	2.4	.7	2.6	19.4
Maceo Baston	PF	47	2	405	74	16	12	18	138	8.6	1.6	.3	.3	.4	2.9
Shawne Williams	SG	46	3	556	83	22	6	8	180	12.1	1.8	.5	.1	.2	3.9
Marquis Daniels	SG	45	4	800	82	57	27	7	320	17.8	1.8	1.3	.6	.2	7.1
Mike Dunleavy Jr.^{†}	SG	43	43	1,529	244	111	46	10	603	35.6	5.7	2.6	1.1	.2	14.0
Troy Murphy^{†}	PF	42	31	1,185	257	66	25	25	467	28.2	6.1	1.6	.6	.6	11.1
Ike Diogu^{†}	PF	42	2	538	140	20	5	15	243	12.8	3.3	.5	.1	.4	5.8
Orien Greene	SG	41	0	254	44	22	17	4	63	6.2	1.1	.5	.4	.1	1.5
Rawle Marshall	SG	40	2	361	29	13	12	5	99	9.0	.7	.3	.3	.1	2.5
Stephen Jackson^{†}	SG	37	32	1,186	95	114	33	20	521	32.1	2.6	3.1	.9	.5	14.1
Šarūnas Jasikevičius^{†}	SG	37	1	664	48	111	13	0	273	17.9	1.3	3.0	.4	.0	7.4
Al Harrington^{†}	PF	36	36	1,208	226	51	25	10	572	33.6	6.3	1.4	.7	.3	15.9
David Harrison	C	24	2	190	42	6	5	12	71	7.9	1.8	.3	.2	.5	3.0
Keith McLeod^{†}	PG	22	7	339	22	45	7	2	93	15.4	1.0	2.0	.3	.1	4.2
Josh Powell^{†}	PF	7	0	64	19	3	0	0	12	9.1	2.7	.4	.0	.0	1.7

- ^{†} Denotes player spent time with another team in the season. Stats reflect time with the Pacers only.

== Awards and records ==
- Jermaine O'Neal, NBA All-Star Game

== Transactions ==
January 16, 2007	To Indiana Pacers Troy Murphy, Mike Dunleavy Jr., Keith McLeod, Ike Diogu and a second-round draft pick	To Golden State Warriors Josh Powell, Šarūnas Jasikevičius, Stephen Jackson and Al Harrington

== Roster changes ==
=== Additions ===
Player	Acquired	Former team	Position
Darrell Armstrong	Trade	Dallas Mavericks	PG
Maceo Baston	Signed as free agent	Maccabi Tel Aviv	PF
Marquis Daniels	Trade	Dallas Mavericks	SG
Ike Diogu	Trade	Golden State Warriors	PF
Mike Dunleavy Jr.	Trade	Golden State Warriors	SF
Orien Greene	Signed as free agent	Boston Celtics	PG
Al Harrington	Trade	Atlanta Hawks	PF
Rawle Marshall	Trade	Dallas Mavericks	SG
Keith McLeod	Trade	Golden State Warriors	PG
Troy Murphy	Trade	Golden State Warriors	PF
Josh Powell	Trade	Dallas Mavericks	PF
Shawne Williams	Draft selection	rookie	SF

=== Subtractions ===
Player	Departed	New team	Position
Jonathan Bender	Retired	none	PF
Austin Croshere	Trade	Dallas Mavericks	PF
Eddie Gill	Signed as free agent	New Jersey Nets	PG
Al Harrington	Trade	Golden State Warriors	PF
Stephen Jackson	Trade	Golden State Warriors	SF
Sarunas Jasikevicius	Trade	Golden State Warriors	PG
Anthony Johnson	Trade	Dallas Mavericks	PG
Fred Jones	Signed as free agent	Toronto Raptors	SG
Scot Pollard	Signed as free agent	Cleveland Cavaliers	C
Josh Powell	Trade	Golden State Warriors	PF
Predrag Stojakovic	Signed as free agent	New Orleans Hornets	SF
Samaki Walker	Waived	none	PF
