= Boom goes the dynamite =

Catchphrase

"Boom goes the dynamite!" is a catchphrase coined by then–Ball State University student Brian Collins. It was popularized after a video of him delivering an ill-fated sports broadcast that included the phrase was shared on YouTube in 2005. In the ensuing years it has become a popular phrase, used to indicate a pivotal moment.

== Origins ==
During his freshman year, Collins agreed to appear on Ball State University's campus newscast in place of the regular sportscaster. The teleprompter was operational, but an inexperienced operator accidentally fast-forwarded through the script. Collins did have the script printed out as a backup, but the pages were out of order, leaving Collins with no choice but to ad-lib. Among the games Collins had to report on was the March 22, 2005, NBA game between the Indiana Pacers and New Jersey Nets. The phrase can be heard as Pacers shooting guard Fred Jones hit a three-pointer with 2:03 left in the first quarter.

Collins had coined the phrase earlier in his freshman year while playing a video game in the Mario Kart series with his college roommates; the group had enjoyed coming up with new phrases to shout during moments of triumph in the game.

A video of the broadcast was posted on YouTube several months later.

A trademark application on the phrase was filed but ultimately abandoned by a San Diego–based speculator who offered it on T-shirts, saying that part of the proceeds would go to a scholarship fund at Ball State for journalism students.

ESPN SportsCenter anchor Scott Van Pelt sent Collins words of encouragement and paid homage to him using the "boom" catchphrase on the air several times.

== Analysis ==
The newscast is now known as "the Collins incident" in communications classes.

In 2009, the Fox Sports program Best Damn Sports Show Period called the clip the No. 1 biggest "sports blooper" in all of televised sports reporting history.

== Collins media appearances ==
Collins' sportscast was featured on television and radio throughout the country and earned him an appearance on The Late Show (hosted by Ball State alumnus David Letterman) on June 9, 2005.

Collins was featured in the "Web Redemption" segment of the May 24, 2011, episode of Tosh.0. He was by then a professional freelance reporter, although he stated that he had not covered sports since the infamous 2005 incident.

Collins, among other internet stars, was set to star in the film The Chronicles of Rick Roll, which was first announced in 2011.

== In popular culture ==
"Boom Goes the Dynamite" is the title of an episode of the TV show Scandal that aired on February 21, 2013. The phrase is also said by a character during the episode. The phrase was also used by Oliver Bird in Season 1, Episode 8 of Legion when starting a procedure on David.

The phrase has also been used in video games to indicate some notable accomplishment, including the games Orcs Must Die!, Heroes of Newerth, Sam & Max: The Devil's Playhouse, Saints Row: The Third, Saints Row IV, Uncharted 2: Among Thieves, APB: Reloaded, Borderlands, NBA Jam, Tomb Raider, and Overwatch.

Will Smith used the line after a mispronunciation during the 81st Academy Awards in 2009.

The quote was referenced in the teaser trailer for Deadpool 2, where during the credits the boom operator for Deadpool's parody of the PBS series The Joy of Painting is listed as "goes the dynamite".
