= NCAA Final Four 2003 =

2002 video game

- Cover featuring Juan Dixon
- Developer(s): Killer Game
- Publisher(s): Sony Computer Entertainment America
- Platform(s): PlayStation 2
- Release: NA: November 27, 2002
- Genre(s): Sports (Basketball)
- Mode(s): Single-player, Multiplayer

NCAA Final Four 2003 is a 2002 basketball video game developed by Killer Game and published by Sony Computer Entertainment for PlayStation 2. It was released under the 989 Sports brand.

== Reception ==
Reception

Aggregate score
Aggregator	Score
Metacritic	57/100

Review scores
Publication	Score
Game Informer	1.25/10
GamePro	3/5 stars
GameSpot	5.3/10
GameZone	6.4/10
IGN	6/10
Official U.S. PlayStation Magazine	2.5/5 stars
PlayStation: The Official Magazine	6/10
X-Play	2/5 stars

The game received "mixed" reviews according to the review aggregation website Metacritic.
