= Kevinn Pinkney =

American basketball player (born 1983)

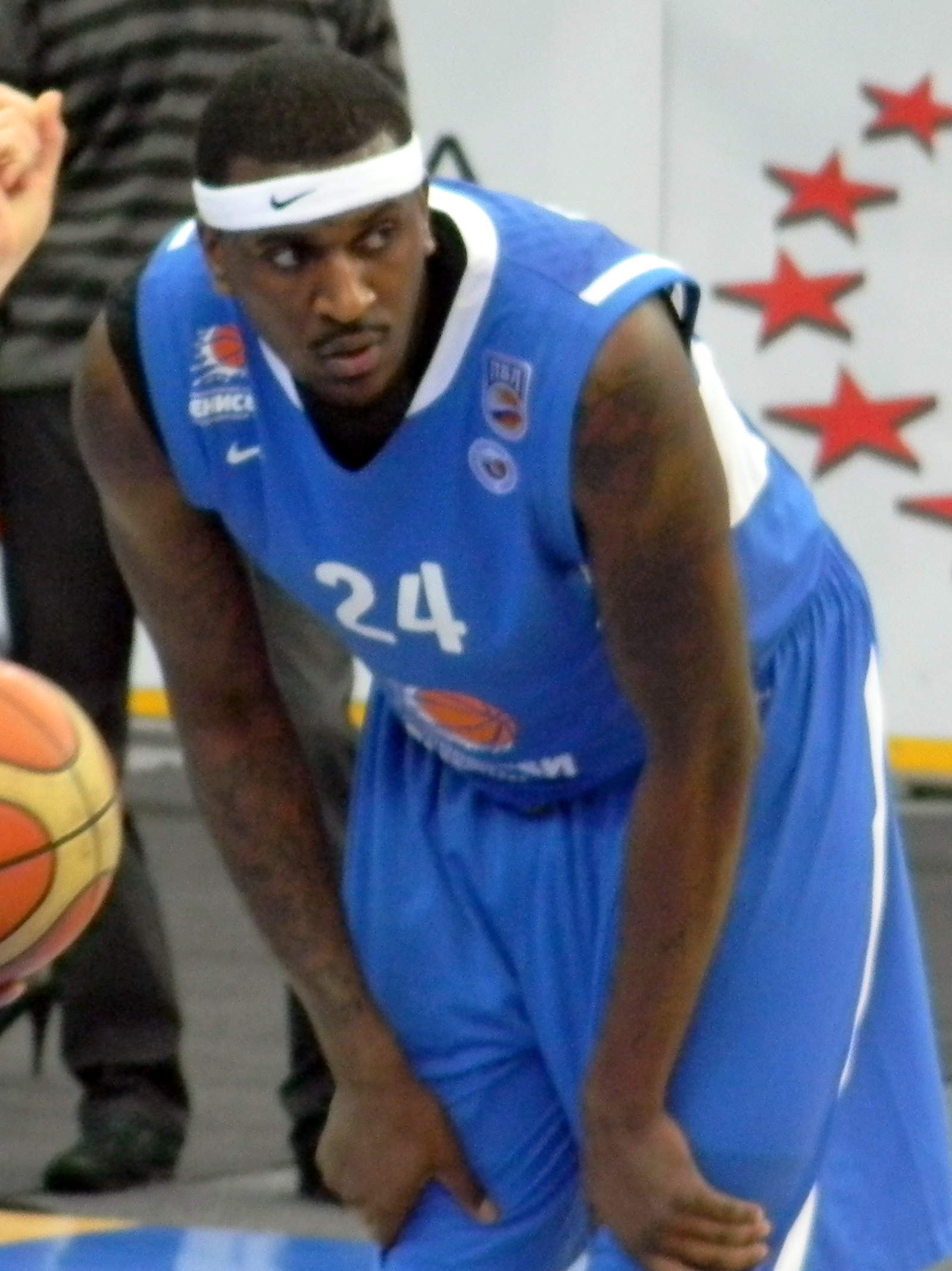

Personal information
- Born: October 10, 1983 (age 42) Colton, California, U.S.
- Listed height: 6 ft 10 in (2.08 m)
- Listed weight: 245 lb (111 kg)

Career information
- High school: Colton (Colton, California)
- College: Nevada (2001–2005)
- NBA draft: 2005: undrafted
- Playing career: 2005–2020
- Position: Center / power forward
- Number: 51, 24

Career history
- 2005: Stade Clermontois BA
- 2006: Turów Zgorzelec
- 2006–2007: Bakersfield Jam
- 2007: Boston Celtics
- 2007–2008: Angelico Biella
- 2008–2009: NGC Cantù
- 2009–2010: Hapoel Jerusalem
- 2010–2011: Union Olimpija
- 2011: Enisey Krasnoyarsk
- 2011–2012: Aliağa Petkim
- 2012–2013: Atleticos de San German
- 2013: Angelico Biella
- 2013: Trabzonspor Basketball
- 2013: Heilongjiang Zhaozhou Feng Shen
- 2013–2014: Al Naser Dubai
- 2015: Champville SC
- 2015–2016: Bucaneros de La Guaira
- 2016: Phoenix Fuel Masters
- 2017: Maccabi Haifa
- 2017–2018: Stal Ostrów Wielkopolski
- 2018: Boca Juniors
- 2019–2020: Rizing Zephyr Fukuoka

Career highlights
- Slovenian Cup champion (2011); NBA D-League All-Star (2007); All-NBA D-League Second Team (2007); WAC All-Defensive Team (2005)
- Stats at NBA.com
- Stats at Basketball Reference

Kevinn Lamar Pinkney (born October 10, 1983) is an American professional basketball player.

== Professional career ==
Despite a highly successful career as a power forward at the University of Nevada, Reno where he also played with 2007 draft prospect Nick Fazekas and led the overachieving Wolf Pack to the Sweet 16 of the 2004 NCAA Tournament, the 6'10" Pinkney did not hear his name called on draft night of 2005. His size and abilities did not fit scouts' prototypical image of either a power forward or a center. Thus, Pinkney had to pursue his professional basketball career in Europe, where he played for Clermont in France and PGE Turow in Poland.

After a lackluster performance overseas, Pinkney returned to the United States and secured a roster spot on the summer league entry for the Portland Trail Blazers. He averaged 5.5 points, 3 rebounds and 2.8 assists during limited summer league minutes but did not make the team. The Washington Wizards signed Pinkney as an extra body for training camp but also cut him. Pinkney then signed with the NBA D-League's Bakersfield Jam where he flourished offensively, averaging 20 points per game on 51% shooting. He registered several double-doubles and was named to the 2006–07 Western Conference D-League All-Star team.

On April 4, 2007, the injury-plagued Boston Celtics, owners of the worst record in the Eastern Conference, received a roster exemption from the NBA to add a 16th player. Pinkney made his debut later that night in a game against the Milwaukee Bucks. Sporting #51, the burly center scored 15 points in his NBA debut. Pinkney was re-signed for another 10-day contract, and played 6 games for the Celtics in total, averaging 5.2 PPG.

For the 2007–2008 season, he signed with the Italian Serie A team Angelico Biella.

In September 2010 he signed a one-year contract with KK Union Olimpija in Slovenia, but he left the club by mutual consent on February 28, 2011. In March 2011 he signed with Enisey Krasnoyarsk in Russia until the end of the season. In October 2011 he signed a one-year deal with Aliağa Petkim in Turkey. He then joined the Atleticos de San German of Puerto Rico. In April 2013, he signed with Trabzonspor Basketball.

In March 2015, he signed with Bucaneros de La Guaira of Venezuela.

On February 26, 2016, Pinkney was signed by Phoenix Fuel Masters of the Philippine Basketball Association, replacing Kenny Adeleke as the team's import.

On January 23, 2017, Pinkney signed with Israeli club Maccabi Haifa.

On November 30, 2017, Pinkney signed with Polish club Stal Ostrów Wielkopolski.

=== The Basketball Tournament (TBT) (2017–present) ===
In the summer of 2017, Pinkney played in The Basketball Tournament on ESPN for Team Challenge ALS. He competed for the $2 million prize in 2017, and for Team Challenge ALS, he averaged 7.0 points per game. Pinkney helped take the sixth-seeded Team Challenge ALS to the Championship Game of the tournament, where they lost in a close game to Overseas Elite 86–83.

In TBT 2018, Pinkney averaged four points per game and three rebounds per game for Team Challenge ALS. They reached the West Regional Championship Game before losing to eventual tournament runner-up Eberlein Drive.
