= Fred Jones (basketball) =

American basketball player (born 1979)

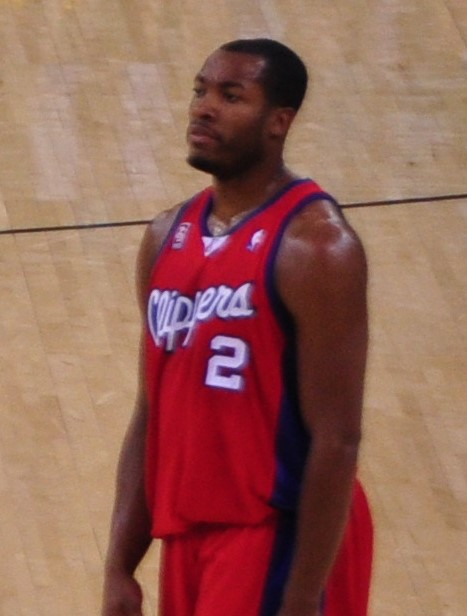
- Jones with the Los Angeles Clippers in 2009

Personal information
- Born: March 11, 1979 (age 47) Malvern, Arkansas, U.S.
- Listed height: 6 ft 2 in (1.88 m)
- Listed weight: 225 lb (102 kg)

Career information
- High school: Sam Barlow (Gresham, Oregon)
- College: Oregon (1998–2002)
- NBA draft: 2002: 1st round, 14th overall pick
- Drafted by: Indiana Pacers
- Playing career: 2002–2011
- Position: Shooting guard
- Number: 0, 2, 20
- Coaching career: 2015–2016

Career history

Playing
- 2002–2006: Indiana Pacers
- 2006–2007: Toronto Raptors
- 2007: Portland Trail Blazers
- 2007–2008: New York Knicks
- 2008–2009: Los Angeles Clippers
- 2009–2010: Pallacanestro Biella
- 2010–2011: Guangdong Southern Tigers

Career highlights
- NBA Slam Dunk Contest champion (2004); First-team All-Pac-10 (2002)

Career NBA statistics
- Points: 3,206 (7.5 PPG)
- Assists: 990 (2.4 APG)
- Rebounds: 958 (2.2 RPG)
- Stats at NBA.com
- Stats at Basketball Reference

Frederick Terrell Jones (born March 11, 1979) is an American former professional basketball player. He played college basketball for the Oregon Ducks and was the winner of the NBA Slam Dunk Contest at the 2004 NBA All-Star Game.

== Early career ==
Born in Malvern, Arkansas, Fred Jones moved to Portland, Oregon, in middle school and became the Oregon High School Player of the Year in both his Junior and Senior years for Sam Barlow High School in Gresham, a suburb of Portland. He then went on to play four seasons at the University of Oregon, where, during his senior year, he led the Ducks to the Elite Eight, with the help of Luke Ridnour and Luke Jackson. While widely considered to be an underachiever during his first three years at Oregon, Jones jumped onto the national radar screen as a senior, becoming a candidate for Pac-10 Player of the Year and averaging 18.6 points per game.

== Professional career ==
=== NBA ===
Jones was the 14th pick in the 2002 NBA draft by the Indiana Pacers. He was drafted by Isiah Thomas. He played sparingly as a rookie, averaging only 1.2 points per game in 19 appearances while playing behind Reggie Miller. That scoring average increased to nearly 5 points per game in his second year while appearing in 81 games. He more than doubled his averages during the 2004–05 season (to 10.6 ppg), partly due to teammate and small forward Ron Artest being suspended for the season for his involvement in The Malice at The Palace incident. In his first start after the incident, Jones scored a career-high 31 points against the Orlando Magic, establishing himself as one of the team's primary scoring weapons.

In 2004, he won the NBA Slam Dunk Contest, beating out two-time champion Jason Richardson, but did not compete in the contest again.

On November 23, 2004, against the Boston Celtics, Jones recorded his first double double, with 16 points and a career-high 10 rebounds. His three-pointer against the New Jersey Nets on March 22, 2005, earned Internet fame when a Ball State University student newscaster described it in his recap and followed with the phrase "Boom goes the dynamite."

In the 2006 off-season, the Toronto Raptors signed Jones. On February 22, 2007, the Raptors traded Jones to the Portland Trail Blazers in exchange for guard Juan Dixon.

Jones, along with Zach Randolph and Dan Dickau, was traded to the New York Knicks on June 28, 2007, for Channing Frye and Steve Francis. The trade reunited Jones with New York Knicks head coach Isiah Thomas, the man who drafted him. The Knicks did not re-sign him after the year.

On December 28, 2008, Jones signed with the Los Angeles Clippers as a free agent. He was waived on January 5, 2009, however three days later he was again signed by the Clippers to a 10-day contract. On January 28, 2009, Jones received news that the Clippers would re-sign him for the rest of the season, which they did the following day.

Jones' final NBA game was on April 15, 2009, in an 85–126 loss to the Oklahoma City Thunder where he recorded eight points and five assists.

=== Italy ===
In August 2009 Jones signed with Italian team Pallacanestro Biella.

=== China ===
On November 3, 2010, it was announced that Fred Jones had signed a contract to play for the Guangdong Southern Tigers of the Chinese Basketball Association. He was waived in January 2011.

== Coaching career ==
Jones returned to Oregon to complete his degree and was an undergraduate assistant coach for the Ducks in 2015–16.

== NBA career statistics ==
Legend
GP	Games played	GS	Games started	MPG	Minutes per game
FG%	Field goal percentage	3P%	3-point field goal percentage	FT%	Free throw percentage
RPG	Rebounds per game	APG	Assists per game	SPG	Steals per game
BPG	Blocks per game	PPG	Points per game	**Bold**	Career high

=== Regular season ===
Year	Team	GP	GS	MPG	FG%	3P%	FT%	RPG	APG	SPG	BPG	PPG
2002–03	Indiana	19	1	6.1	.375	.286	.750	.5	.3	.3	.1	1.2
2003–04	Indiana	**81**	2	18.6	.395	.303	.832	1.6	2.1	.8	.2	4.9
2004–05	Indiana	77	14	**29.5**	**.425**	.380	**.850**	**3.1**	2.5	.8	**.4**	**10.6**
2005–06	Indiana	68	2	27.0	.417	.337	.763	2.5	2.3	.8	.3	9.6
2006–07	Toronto	39	9	22.3	.386	.317	.830	2.1	1.4	.8	.3	7.6
2006–07	Portland	24	3	18.7	.384	.259	.846	1.4	2.2	.8	.2	4.8
2007–08	New York	70	**26**	25.1	.421	**.385**	.746	2.4	2.4	.7	.3	7.6
2008–09	L.A. Clippers	52	21	28.8	.407	.367	.815	2.4	**3.6**	**1.0**	.2	7.3
Career		430	78	24.0	.411	.353	.809	2.2	2.3	.8	.3	7.5

==== Playoffs ====
Year	Team	GP	GS	MPG	FG%	3P%	FT%	RPG	APG	SPG	BPG	PPG
2004	Indiana	**14**	0	18.8	**.490**	**.500**	.714	2.4	1.1	.5	**.5**	4.7
2005	Indiana	13	0	18.0	.296	.391	**.923**	1.8	1.0	.6	.2	4.1
2006	Indiana	6	**1**	**27.8**	.417	.375	.917	**3.3**	**2.5**	**1.0**	.2	**7.8**
Career		33	1	20.1	.397	.426	.875	2.3	1.3	.6	.3	5.0
