= Luke Jackson (basketball, born 1981) =

American basketball player (born 1981)

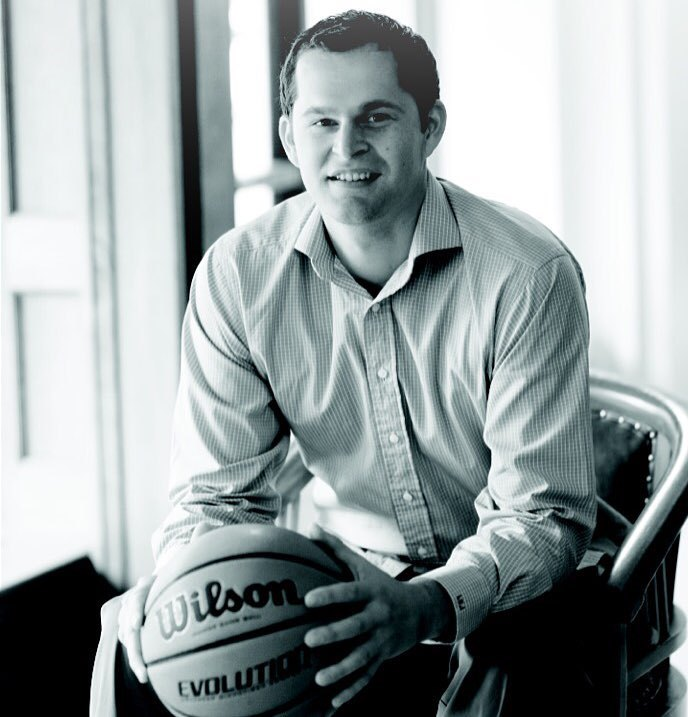

Personal information
- Born: November 6, 1981 (age 45) Eugene, Oregon, U.S.
- Listed height: 6 ft 7 in (2.01 m)
- Listed weight: 215 lb (98 kg)

Career information
- High school: Creswell (Creswell, Oregon)
- College: Oregon (2000–2004)
- NBA draft: 2004: 1st round, 10th overall pick
- Drafted by: Cleveland Cavaliers
- Playing career: 2004–2011
- Position: Small forward
- Number: 33, 7, 6
- Coaching career: 2013–present

Career history

Playing
- 2004–2006: Cleveland Cavaliers
- 2006–2007: Idaho Stampede
- 2007: Los Angeles Clippers
- 2007: Toronto Raptors
- 2007–2008: Miami Heat
- 2008–2009: Idaho Stampede
- 2009–2010: Carife Ferrara
- 2010–2011: Idaho Stampede
- 2011: Hapoel Jerusalem

Career highlights
- Consensus second-team All-American (2004); 2× First-team All-Pac-10 (2003, 2004)
- Stats at NBA.com
- Stats at Basketball Reference

Luke Ryan Jackson (born November 6, 1981) is an American former professional basketball player in the National Basketball Association (NBA). He played college basketball for the Oregon Ducks, earning consensus second-team All-American honors as a senior in 2004. He was selected by the Cleveland Cavaliers in the first round of the 2004 NBA draft with the 10th overall pick. After his playing career, Jackson was a head coach for the Northwest Christian University Beacons.

== High school and college career ==
A four-year letterman in both basketball and baseball at Creswell High School, he was Oregon's Class AAA Basketball Player of the Year in 1998 and 2000. He averaged 24.2 points, 8.1 assists and 5.0 steals per game as a senior to help Creswell win the 2000 Oregon State Basketball Championship (Class AAA). He finished his career ranked fourth all-time in Oregon high school history, with 2,095 points.

Jackson continued his on court success with a storied four-season career at the University of Oregon, leading the Ducks to an Elite Eight finish in 2002 NCAA tournament as a sophomore. Among his teammates at Oregon were future NBA players Luke Ridnour and Fred Jones.

Jackson is the only men's basketball player in school history to place in the top ten in nine different statistical categories. He is second all-time in points scored, third in total steals, fourth in assists and seventh in rebounds and is first in free throws made. Jackson is one of two Pac-10 players to score over 1,900 points, grab over 700 rebounds and contribute over 400 assists over their career. In one of the greatest individual performances of all-time at Mac Court, Jackson scored 40 points — including 29 straight in the second half and overtime — as Oregon overcame an 18-point deficit to defeat Colorado 77–72 in the first round of the National Invitation Tournament on March 17, 2004. He also became only the second freshman in Pac-10 history to record a triple-double when on February 17, 2001, he added 14 points, 11 rebounds and ten assists in a contest versus Washington. In his junior year, Jackson's second and final career triple-doubles against Florida A&M made him only the third Pac-10 player in history to achieve multiple career triple-doubles (joining Jason Kidd and Loren Woods).

Named to the Pac-10 All-Freshman Team in 2000–01, Pac-10 honorable mention in 2001–02, and All-Pac-10 in 2002–03 and 2003–04, he also garnered All-American honors from The Sporting News, Basketball Times, ESPN.com and CBS SportsLine.com.

His senior campaign saw the lanky swingman lead Oregon in points (21.2), rebounds (7.2) and assists (4.5) while becoming a finalist for the John R. Wooden Award and Naismith College Player of the Year award. Jackson graduated from the University of Oregon with a degree in political science.

== Professional career ==
Following the previous season where the Cleveland Cavaliers as a team had a league-worst 3PT% and a successful rookie season from Lebron James, Cleveland Cavaliers sought an older player that was ready to contribute and could shoot well.

Jackson, a senior who shot 40% from 3 in college, fit both criteria. Cleveland selected Jackson with the tenth pick overall in the 2004 NBA Draft. His rookie season was plagued by back issues that began in summer league, was later diagnosed as a herniated disk and required surgery, limiting him to 10 games.

In his second season, he only played in 36 games after breaking his left wrist in a February 2006 game against the Philadelphia 76ers and he underwent a 2nd back surgery at the end of the season.

That Fall, Cleveland traded Jackson, along with an undisclosed amount of cash, to the Boston Celtics in return for center Dwayne Jones; Jackson was waived before the 2006–07 season started on October 27.

Recovered from his injuries, Jackson signed with the Idaho Stampede of the NBDL. Jackson averaged 12.5 points, 2.3 rebounds and 3.2 assists in 30.8 minutes in six games with Idaho, gaining the attention of the injury rattled Los Angeles Clippers. He signed to a 10-day contract in January 2007 with the Clippers, but his stay in Los Angeles was brief, appearing in only three games.

On March 25, 2007, Jackson was signed to a 10-day contract by the Toronto Raptors to provide bench depth. After performing well in limited minutes, he was signed to a second ten-day contract and then to a two-year pact with Toronto for the rest of the 2006–2007 NBA season, and the 2007–08 season as well. On April 18, 2007, in Toronto's last game of the regular season, Jackson exploded for a career-high 30 points and 5 assists while logging a career maximum 39 minutes in a defeat to the Philadelphia 76ers.

On October 29, 2007, Jackson was waived by the Raptors. He was reacquired by the Idaho Stampede on December 4, 2007. In his first game with that club (the only one that season), he scored 30 points in 31 minutes with 7–14 shooting, including 11–11 at the free throw line and 5–6 from long range. He also had four rebounds, nine assists, one steal, one blocked shot, three turnovers, and no personal fouls. He then left the team for a workout with the Miami Heat.

On December 12, 2007, the Heat released Penny Hardaway to clear a roster spot for Jackson. During his stay in Miami, Jackson averaged 5.6 points, 2.4 rebounds and 1.2 assists. He was waived by the Miami Heat on February 6, 2008. This last stint in Miami ended up being Jackson's last playing days in the NBA for the rest of his professional basketball career. His final game was played on February 1, 2008, in an 85–94 loss to the New Jersey Nets where he recorded 10 points, five rebounds and one steal.

Jackson was signed by the Portland Trail Blazers in August 2008, but was released so the Blazers could keep under the 15-player limit.

Jackson re-signed with the Idaho Stampede in December 2008. He was named to the 2009 NBDL All-Star Game on February 3, 2009.

Jackson played with the Dallas Mavericks summer league team in 2009. On August 12, 2009, he moved to Italy and signed a one-year contract with Carife Ferrara.

Jackson was invited to the Memphis Grizzlies preseason camp in September 2010, but was waived on October 10.

Jackson later rejoined the Idaho Stampede. In 2011, Jackson was signed by Hapoel Jerusalem B.C. from the Israeli Basketball Super League.

== Coaching ==
On February 20, 2013, Jackson was introduced as the new head coach at Northwest Christian University, in Eugene, Oregon, replacing Corey Anderson. During his first season at the helm of the Beacons, Jackson led his team to their first ever appearance in the NAIA Division II National Championship Tournament. In four seasons as coach of the Beacons, Jackson led the team to an 88–38 record, two conference regular season titles, and three NAIA Division II tournament appearances. In 2024 Jackson took the job at Pleasant Hill High School a 3a school located near Eugene in Oregon.

== Career playing statistics ==
Legend
GP	Games played	GS	Games started	MPG	Minutes per game
FG%	Field goal percentage	3P%	3-point field goal percentage	FT%	Free throw percentage
RPG	Rebounds per game	APG	Assists per game	SPG	Steals per game
BPG	Blocks per game	PPG	Points per game	**Bold**	Career high

=== NBA ===
==== Regular season ====
Year	Team	GP	GS	MPG	FG%	3P%	FT%	RPG	APG	SPG	BPG	PPG
2004–05	Cleveland	10	0	4.3	.370	**.667**	**.833**	.6	.3	.0	.0	2.9
2005–06	Cleveland	**36**	0	8.8	.341	.333	.788	1.1	.7	.3	**.1**	2.7
2006–07	L.A. Clippers	3	0	5.3	.125	.250	–	.3	**1.3**	.0	.0	1.0
2006–07	Toronto	10	**2**	12.2	**.514**	.308	.556	.9	.9	.5	**.1**	4.5
2007–08	Miami	14	1	**16.3**	.325	.367	.696	**2.4**	1.2	**.6**	.0	**5.6**
Career		73	3	9.9	.357	.360	.732	1.2	.8	.3	.0	3.5

==== Playoffs ====
Year	Team	GP	GS	MPG	FG%	3P%	FT%	RPG	APG	SPG	BPG	PPG
2006–07	Toronto	3	0	3.7	–	–	1.000	1.7	.3	.3	.0	2.0

== Career highlights and awards ==
College

- 2004 NCAA Men's Basketball All-American

NBA/NBA D-League

- NBA D-League All-Star (2009–10)
- Led NBA D-League in 3-Point Pct. (2006–07)
- NBA D-League champion (2008)

== Head coaching record ==
=== NAIA ===
Record table
Season	Team	Overall	Conference	Standing	Postseason
Northwest Christian (Cascade Collegiate Conference) (2013–2017)
2013–14	Northwest Christian	18–14	10–8	T–5th	NAIA Division II first round
2014–15	Northwest Christian	17–11	10–8	5th	
2015–16	Northwest Christian	28–7	17–3	1st	NAIA Division II second round
2016–17	Northwest Christian	25–6	17–3	1st	NAIA Division II second round
Northwest Christian:		88–38 (.698)	54–22 (.711)		
Total:		88–38 (.698)			
National champion Postseason invitational champion Conference regular season champion Conference regular season and conference tournament champion Division regular season champion Division regular season and conference tournament champion Conference tournament champion
