= 2006–07 Miami Heat season =

NBA professional basketball team season

- Division champions
- Head coach: Pat Riley
- President: Pat Riley
- General manager: Randy Pfund
- Owner: Micky Arison
- Arena: American Airlines Arena

Results
- Record: 44–38 (.537)
- Place: Division: 1st (Southeast); Conference: 4th (Eastern)
- Playoff finish: First Round (lost to Bulls 0–4)
- Stats at Basketball Reference

Local media
- Television: FSN Florida, Sun Sports
- Radio: WIOD

The 2006–07 Miami Heat season was the 19th season for the franchise in the National Basketball Association (NBA). The Heat, for the first time in franchise history, entered the season as the defending NBA champions, having defeated the Dallas Mavericks in the 2006 NBA Finals in six games. On January 3, 2007, head coach Pat Riley took a leave of absence citing hip and knee problems and was replaced by Ron Rothstein. Despite injuries to several players, including Shaquille O'Neal and Dwyane Wade, the Heat repeated as Southeast division champions. With a record of 44–38, it was clear that the Heat was not the same team of years past. The Heat ended the season with a four-game playoff loss in a sweep to the Chicago Bulls in the first round and the Heat became the first defending NBA champions since the Philadelphia Warriors back in 1957 to be swept in the first round. Following the season, Gary Payton retired.

== Key dates ==
- June 28 – The 2006 NBA draft took place in New York City.
- July 8 – The free agency period started.
- October 10 – The Heat played their first preseason game versus the Detroit Pistons at Coliseo de Puerto Rico in San Juan, Puerto Rico.
- October 31 – The Heat's regular season began with a home game versus the Chicago Bulls, where the championship rings were handed out to the members of the 2005-06 championship team.

== Offseason ==
=== 2006 NBA draft ===
The Miami Heat had no selections in the 2006 NBA draft after the following trades:

- ^{t} On July 14, 2004, the L.A. Lakers acquired a 2006 first-round draft pick, Lamar Odom, Caron Butler and Brian Grant from Miami in exchange for Shaquille O'Neal. The L.A. Lakers used the 26th pick to draft Jordan Farmar.
- ^{af} On January 31, 2006, Toronto acquired Miami's 2006 second-round draft pick and New Orleans's 2009 second-round draft pick from New Orleans/Oklahoma City in exchange for Aaron Williams. Previously, New Orleans/Oklahoma City acquired Miami's 2006 second-round draft pick on September 30, 2005, from Boston in exchange for Dan Dickau. Previously, Boston acquired 2006 and 2008 second-round draft picks, Qyntel Woods and the draft rights to Albert Miralles on August 8, 2005, from Miami in a five-team trade with Miami, Memphis, New Orleans/Oklahoma City and Utah. Toronto used the 56th pick to draft Edin Bavčić.

== Roster ==
2006–07 Miami Heat roster
Players

Pos.	No.	Player	Height	Weight	DOB	From
C	30	Earl Barron	7 ft 0 in (2.13 m)	245 lb (111 kg)	1981-08-14	Memphis
F/C	51	Michael Doleac	6 ft 11 in (2.11 m)	262 lb (119 kg)	1977-06-15	Utah
F	40	Udonis Haslem	6 ft 8 in (2.03 m)	235 lb (107 kg)	1980-06-09	Florida
G	6	Eddie Jones	6 ft 6 in (1.98 m)	200 lb (91 kg)	1971-10-20	Temple
G/F	24	Jason Kapono	6 ft 8 in (2.03 m)	215 lb (98 kg)	1981-02-04	UCLA
C	33	Alonzo Mourning	6 ft 10 in (2.08 m)	261 lb (118 kg)	1970-02-08	Georgetown
C	32	Shaquille O'Neal	7 ft 1 in (2.16 m)	325 lb (147 kg)	1972-03-06	LSU
G	20	Gary Payton	6 ft 4 in (1.93 m)	190 lb (86 kg)	1968-07-23	Oregon State
F	42	James Posey	6 ft 8 in (2.03 m)	217 lb (98 kg)	1977-01-13	Xavier
G	11	Chris Quinn	6 ft 2 in (1.88 m)	185 lb (84 kg)	1983-09-27	Notre Dame
F	25	Wayne Simien	6 ft 9 in (2.06 m)	250 lb (113 kg)	1983-03-09	Kansas
G	3	Dwyane Wade	6 ft 4 in (1.93 m)	212 lb (96 kg)	1982-01-17	Marquette
F	8	Antoine Walker	6 ft 9 in (2.06 m)	245 lb (111 kg)	1976-08-12	Kentucky
G	55	Jason Williams	6 ft 1 in (1.85 m)	180 lb (82 kg)	1975-11-18	Florida
F	1	Dorell Wright	6 ft 8 in (2.03 m)	205 lb (93 kg)	1985-12-02	Leuzinger HS (CA)

Coaches
Head coach
- Pat Riley
Assistant(s)
- Keith Askins
- Bill Foran
- Bob McAdoo
- Ron Rothstein
- Erik Spoelstra

Legend
- (DP) Unsigned draft pick
- (FA) Free agent
- (S) Suspended
- Injured

Roster
Updated: February 1, 2007

== Pre-season ==
2006 Pre-season game log: 2–5–0 (home: 1–2–0; road: 1–3–0)
#	Date	Visitor	Score	Home	OT	Decision	Venue	Record	Recap
1	October 10	Detroit Pistons	84–64	Miami Heat		Loss	Coliseo Puerto Rico (San Juan, Puerto Rico)	0–1
2	October 14	Miami Heat	81–91	Atlanta Hawks		Loss	Philips Arena	0–2
3	October 17	New Orleans Hornets	105–109	Miami Heat		Win	American Airlines Arena	1–2
4	October 20	Miami Heat	95–96	Memphis Grizzlies		Loss	FedEx Forum	1–3
5	October 21	Miami Heat	93–103	San Antonio Spurs		Loss	AT&T Center	1–4
6	October 24	Miami Heat	92–82	Orlando Magic		Win	TD Waterhouse Center	2–4
7	October 25	Houston Rockets	96–71	Miami Heat		Loss	American Airlines Arena	2–5

== Regular season ==
=== Standings ===
Southeast Division	W	L	PCT	GB	Home	Road	Div
y-Miami Heat	44	38	.537	-	27–14	17–24	9–7
x-Washington Wizards	41	41	.500	3	26–15	15–26	8–8
x-Orlando Magic	40	42	.488	4	25–16	15–26	9–7
Charlotte Bobcats	33	49	.402	11	20–21	13–28	9–7
Atlanta Hawks	30	52	.366	14	18–23	12–29	5–11

#	Eastern Conference				
#	Team	W	L	PCT	GB
1	c-Detroit Pistons	53	29	.646	–
2	x-Cleveland Cavaliers	50	32	.610	3
3	y-Toronto Raptors	47	35	.573	6
4	y-Miami Heat	44	38	.537	9
5	x-Chicago Bulls	49	33	.598	4
6	x-New Jersey Nets	41	41	.500	12
7	x-Washington Wizards	41	41	.500	12
8	x-Orlando Magic	40	42	.488	13
9	Philadelphia 76ers	35	47	.427	18
10	Indiana Pacers	35	47	.427	18
11	New York Knicks	33	49	.402	20
12	Charlotte Bobcats	33	49	.402	20
13	Atlanta Hawks	30	52	.366	23
14	Milwaukee Bucks	28	54	.341	25
15	Boston Celtics	24	58	.293	29

=== Game log ===
October:4-4

== Playoffs ==
2007 playoff game log
First Round: 0–4 (home: 0–2; road: 0–2)

Game	Date	Team	Score	High points	High rebounds	High assists	Location Attendance	Record
1	April 21	@ Chicago	L 91–96	Dwyane Wade (21)	O'Neal, Haslem (6)	five players tied (3)	United Center; 22,183	0–1
2	April 24	@ Chicago	L 89–107	Dwyane Wade (21)	O'Neal, Posey (8)	Dwyane Wade (7)	United Center; 23,097	0–2
3	April 27	Chicago	L 96–104	Dwyane Wade (28)	Shaquille O'Neal (13)	Dwyane Wade (5)	American Airlines Arena; 20,280	0–3
4	April 29	Chicago	L 79–92	Dwyane Wade (24)	James Posey (18)	Dwyane Wade (10)	American Airlines Arena; 20,283	0–4

2007 schedule

== Player statistics ==
=== Regular season ===
Player	POS	GP	GS	MP	REB	AST	STL	BLK	PTS	MPG	RPG	APG	SPG	BPG	PPG
Udonis Haslem	PF	79	79	2,483	654	97	49	26	844	31.4	8.3	1.2	.6	.3	10.7
Antoine Walker	PF	78	15	1,818	339	130	48	17	660	23.3	4.3	1.7	.6	.2	8.5
Alonzo Mourning	C	77	43	1,572	350	18	13	178	661	20.4	4.5	.2	.2	2.3	8.6
James Posey	SF	71	19	1,919	357	94	71	23	550	27.0	5.0	1.3	1.0	.3	7.7
Gary Payton	PG	68	28	1,503	132	201	43	3	358	22.1	1.9	3.0	.6	.0	5.3
Jason Kapono	SF	67	35	1,767	180	81	38	2	730	26.4	2.7	1.2	.6	.0	10.9
Dorell Wright	SF	66	19	1,292	272	95	41	46	393	19.6	4.1	1.4	.6	.7	6.0
Jason Williams	PG	61	55	1,865	141	322	58	1	664	30.6	2.3	5.3	1.0	.0	10.9
Michael Doleac	C	56	0	698	155	22	18	15	200	12.5	2.8	.4	.3	.3	3.6
Dwyane Wade	SG	51	50	1,931	239	384	107	62	1,397	37.9	4.7	7.5	2.1	1.2	27.4
Chris Quinn	PG	42	1	408	30	65	15	0	141	9.7	.7	1.5	.4	.0	3.4
Shaquille O'Neal	C	40	39	1,135	297	79	8	55	690	28.4	7.4	2.0	.2	1.4	17.3
Eddie Jones^{†}	SG	35	27	1,033	129	76	46	8	332	29.5	3.7	2.2	1.3	.2	9.5
Earl Barron	C	28	0	203	41	5	6	4	65	7.3	1.5	.2	.2	.1	2.3
Robert Hite	SG	12	0	136	16	8	3	2	51	11.3	1.3	.7	.3	.2	4.3
Wayne Simien	PF	8	0	93	11	4	2	0	23	11.6	1.4	.5	.3	.0	2.9

- ^{†} Denotes player spent time with another team in the season. Stats reflect time with the Heat only.

=== Playoffs ===
Player	POS	GP	GS	MP	REB	AST	STL	BLK	PTS	MPG	RPG	APG	SPG	BPG	PPG
Dwyane Wade	SG	4	4	162	19	25	5	2	94	40.5	4.8	6.3	1.3	.5	23.5
Shaquille O'Neal	C	4	4	121	34	5	1	6	75	30.3	8.5	1.3	.3	1.5	18.8
Jason Williams	PG	4	4	112	8	14	5	1	23	28.0	2.0	3.5	1.3	.3	5.8
Udonis Haslem	PF	4	4	103	21	4	1	2	30	25.8	5.3	1.0	.3	.5	7.5
James Posey	SF	4	1	139	31	6	8	5	31	34.8	7.8	1.5	2.0	1.3	7.8
Jason Kapono	SF	4	1	77	5	2	2	0	20	19.3	1.3	.5	.5	.0	5.0
Antoine Walker	PF	4	0	92	9	6	2	1	47	23.0	2.3	1.5	.5	.3	11.8
Alonzo Mourning	C	4	0	55	8	1	0	3	25	13.8	2.0	.3	.0	.8	6.3
Eddie Jones	SG	3	2	66	6	5	1	1	10	22.0	2.0	1.7	.3	.3	3.3
Gary Payton	PG	2	0	32	4	3	0	0	0	16.0	2.0	1.5	.0	.0	.0
Michael Doleac	C	1	0	1	0	0	0	0	0	1.0	.0	.0	.0	.0	.0
Dorell Wright	SF	1	0	1	0	0	0	0	0	1.0	.0	.0	.0	.0	.0
