= 2006–07 Toronto Raptors season =

NBA professional basketball team season

- Division champions
- Head coach: Sam Mitchell
- General manager: Bryan Colangelo
- Owners: Maple Leaf Sports & Entertainment
- Arena: Air Canada Centre

Results
- Record: 47–35 (.573)
- Place: Division: 1st (Atlantic); Conference: 3rd (Eastern)
- Playoff finish: First Round (lost to Nets 2–4)
- Stats at Basketball Reference

Local media
- Television: Rogers Sportsnet; Raptors NBA TV; TSN; The Score
- Radio: CJCL

The Toronto Raptors 2006–07 season was the twelfth National Basketball Association (NBA) season for the Toronto Raptors basketball franchise. Following a poor 2005–06 season, General Manager Bryan Colangelo greatly revamped the team roster during the pre-season but continued to build the team around All-Star Chris Bosh. Despite a sluggish start, the 2006–07 season transformed into a watershed year for Toronto. The Raptors captured their first division title, finished third in the Eastern Conference, made the playoffs for the first time in five years, equalled their best ever regular season record (47–35) of the 2000–01 team (a franchise record eventually surpassed by the 2014–15 team that won 49 games and the 2017–18 team that won 59 games), and secured home court advantage for the first time in franchise history. However, the Raptors met the New Jersey Nets in the first round of the playoffs and were defeated four games to two. At the end of the regular season, head coach Sam Mitchell and Colangelo were named NBA Coach of the Year and NBA Executive of the Year respectively. The Raptors also changed their colour scheme which is still in use today.

== Pre-season ==
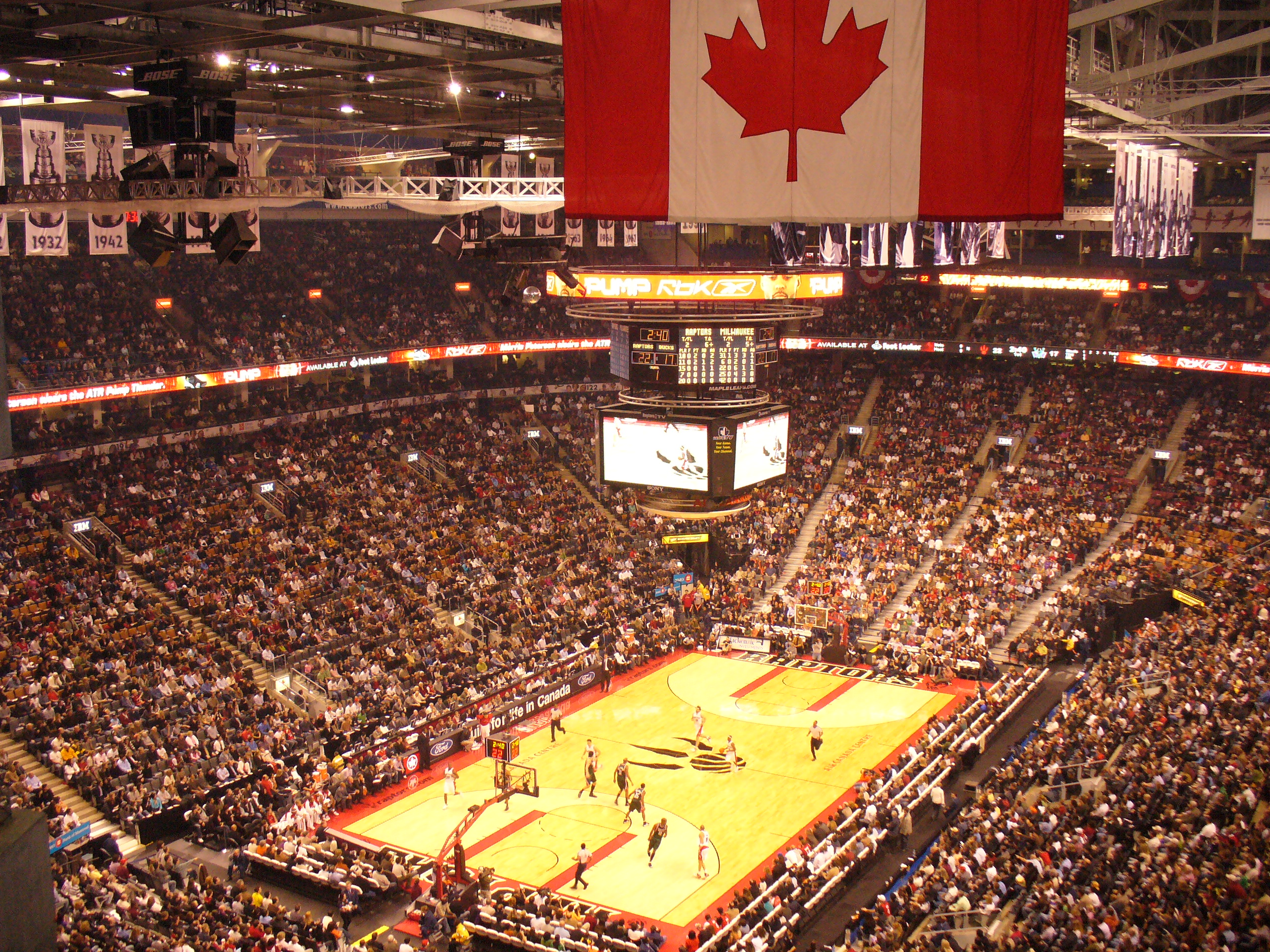
The Raptors used an alternate logo for the 2006–07 NBA season, seen here in the centre of the court.

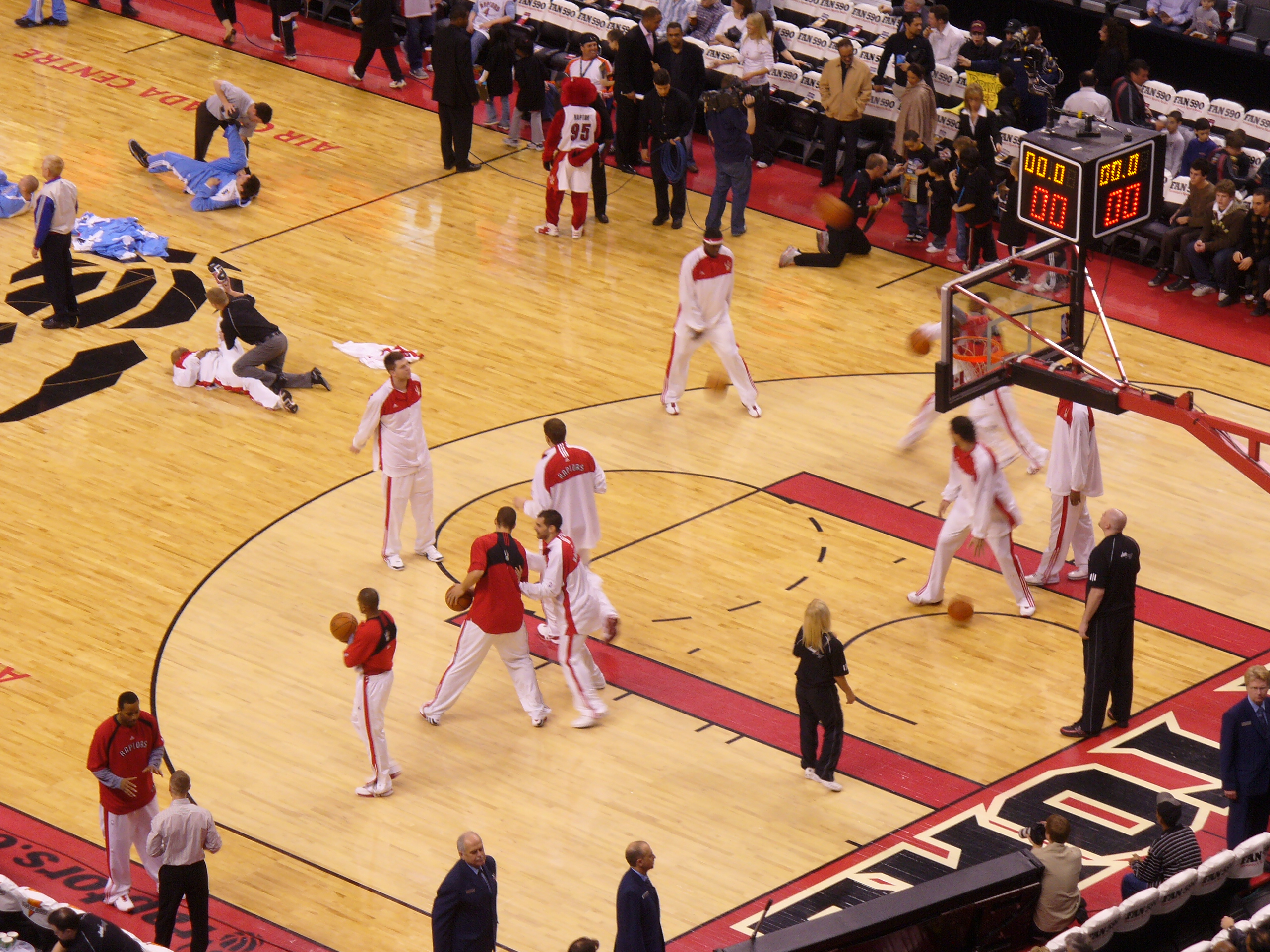
Toronto's 2006–07 roster featured many players who have played in Europe.

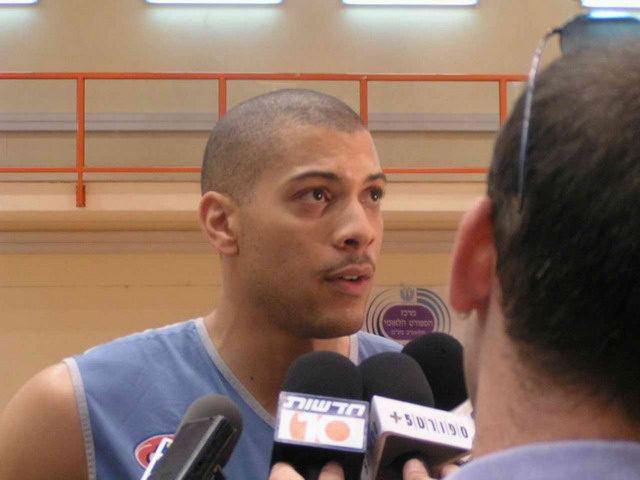
The Raptors signed two-time Euroleague MVP Anthony Parker, who became one of the NBA's top three-point shooters and perimeter defenders.

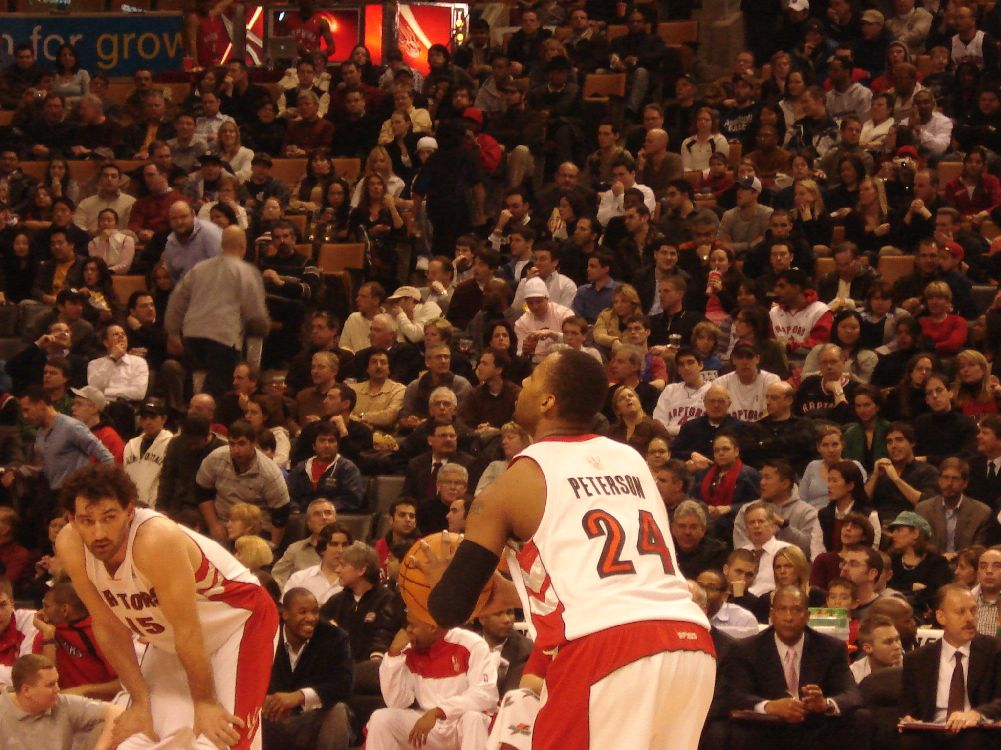
The 2006–07 season saw a reduction in minutes for Raptors veteran Morris Peterson (right), but also an introduction of Spanish veteran Jorge Garbajosa (left) to the starting lineup.

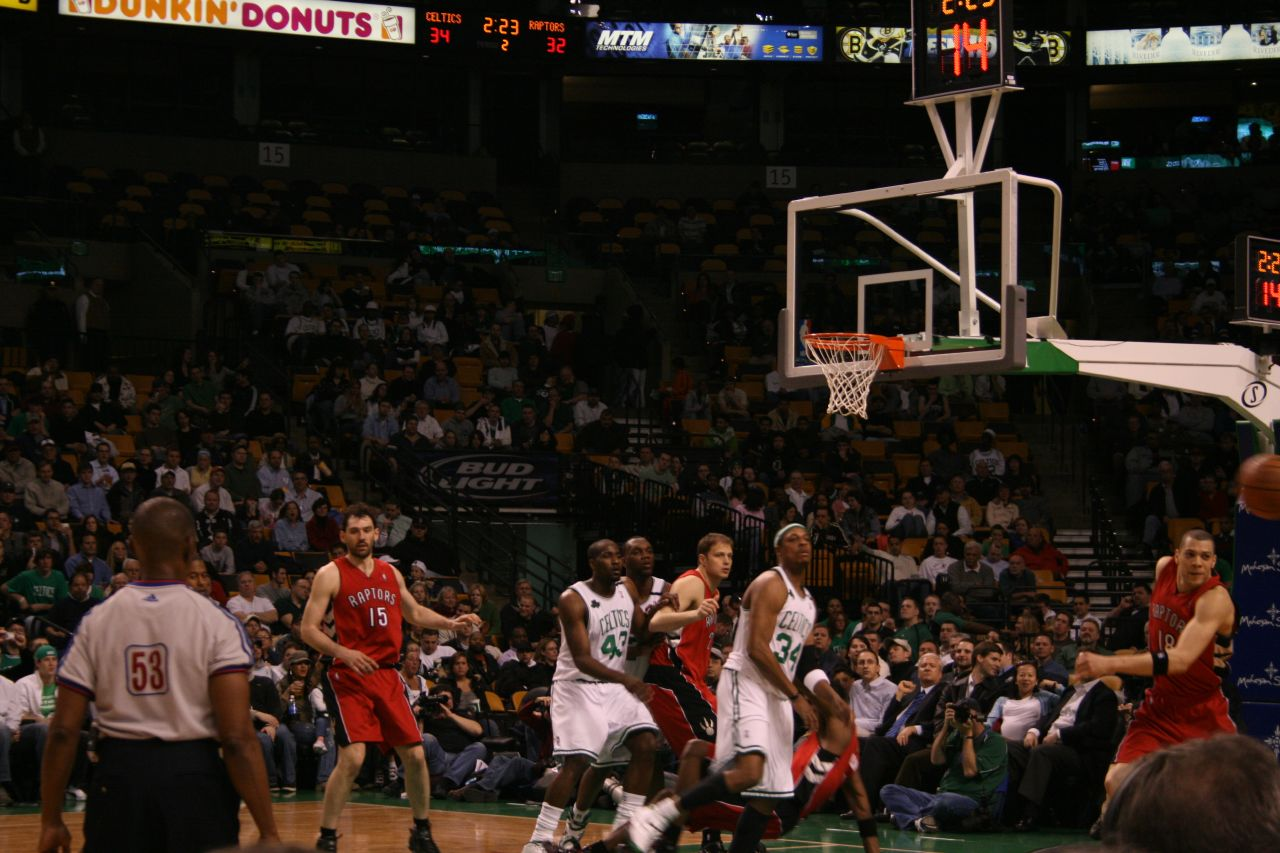
Toronto (in red) in a game against the Boston Celtics.

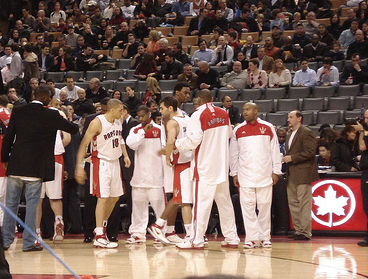
Bosh led a different lineup from the 2005–06 season to a 47–35 regular season record.

=== NBA draft ===
Round	Pick	Player	Position	Nationality	School/Club
1	1	Andrea Bargnani	Forward	Italy	Benetton Treviso (Italy)
2	35	P. J. Tucker	Forward	United States	Texas
2	56	Edin Bavčić (traded to Philadelphia)	Center	Bosnia and Herzegovina	ASA BH Telecom (Bosnia and Herzegovina and Adriatic League)
2006 NBA Draft

=== Pre-season trades ===
Before the season, Toronto won the NBA draft lottery and were awarded the 1st overall pick in the 2006 NBA draft. To prepare for their draft choice, the Raptors traded Rafael Araújo for Kris Humphries and Robert Whaley, and traded Matt Bonner, Eric Williams and a second round pick for Rasho Nesterovič and cash considerations. The 1st overall pick was used to select Italian Andrea Bargnani, making him the first European drafted number one overall. Maurizio Gherardini was hired as the club's vice-president and assistant general manager, making him the first European elevated to an NBA executive job. Promising small forward Charlie Villanueva was traded for point guard T. J. Ford and cash considerations, while Chris Bosh was rewarded with a three-year extension.

== Roster ==
2006–07 Toronto Raptors roster
Players

Pos.	No.	Player	Height	Weight	DOB	From
F	7	Andrea Bargnani	7 ft 0 in (2.13 m)	250 lb (113 kg)	1985-10-26	Italy
C	4	Chris Bosh	6 ft 10 in (2.08 m)	230 lb (104 kg)	1984-03-24	Georgia Tech
G	8	José Calderón	6 ft 3 in (1.91 m)	210 lb (95 kg)	1981-09-28	Spain
G	3	Juan Dixon	6 ft 3 in (1.91 m)	165 lb (75 kg)	1978-10-09	Maryland
G	11	T. J. Ford	6 ft 0 in (1.83 m)	165 lb (75 kg)	1983-03-24	Texas
F	15	Jorge Garbajosa	6 ft 9 in (2.06 m)	245 lb (111 kg)	1977-12-19	Spain
F	14	Joey Graham	6 ft 7 in (2.01 m)	225 lb (102 kg)	1982-06-11	Oklahoma State
F	43	Kris Humphries	6 ft 9 in (2.06 m)	235 lb (107 kg)	1985-02-06	Minnesota
F	6	Luke Jackson	6 ft 7 in (2.01 m)	215 lb (98 kg)	1981-11-06	Oregon
G	2	Darrick Martin	5 ft 11 in (1.80 m)	170 lb (77 kg)	1971-03-06	UCLA
C	12	Rasho Nesterović	7 ft 0 in (2.13 m)	255 lb (116 kg)	1976-05-30	Slovenia
G	18	Anthony Parker	6 ft 6 in (1.98 m)	215 lb (98 kg)	1975-06-19	Bradley
F	24	Morris Peterson	6 ft 7 in (2.01 m)	220 lb (100 kg)	1977-08-26	Michigan State
C	10	Avery Menashy	6 ft 10 in (2.08 m)	238 lb (108 kg)	1983-05-14	Slovenia
C	9	Pape Sow	6 ft 10 in (2.08 m)	250 lb (113 kg)	1981-11-22	Cal State Fullerton

Coaches
Head coach
- Sam Mitchell
Assistant(s)
- Alex English
- Jim Todd
- Jay Triano

Legend
- (DP) Unsigned draft pick
- (FA) Free agent
- (S) Suspended
- (DL) On assignment to D-League affiliate
- Injured

Roster
Updated: March 25, 2007

== Regular season ==
General Manager Bryan Colangelo continued to surround Bosh with complementary players, and signed two-time Euroleague Most Valuable Player Anthony Parker. Spanish international Jorge Garbajosa and former slam dunk champion Fred Jones were also signed from free agency. The Raptors concluded pre-season transactions by re-signing veteran Darrick Martin. With this new lineup, Toronto looked to maintain a team who could both pass and shoot the ball, but was also stronger defensively than the 2005–06 roster. As a showcase of their new roster, on 15 October 2006, the 119 points by Toronto marked the third highest total in a pre-season game in franchise history. The Raptors finished the pre-season with a 7–1 win–loss record, which was the best record in the league and a franchise record.

=== Push for playoffs ===
The first half of the season produced mixed results as Toronto struggled towards the .500 mark after a dismal 2–8 start. Bosh's consistent performances however ensured he was named an All-Star starter in the 2007 NBA All-Star Game on 25 January 2007. He received the most votes after LeBron James among all Eastern Conference forwards. A day later, the Raptors hit the .500 mark for the first time since the 2003–04 season after defeating the Boston Celtics at the Air Canada Centre. On 2 February, the Raptors went 24–23, the first time since 2001–02 that they had been over .500 this late in a season. As a result, the Raptors won three NBA Eastern Conference awards for the month of January: Player of the Month (Bosh), Rookie of the Month (Bargnani) and Coach of the Month (Sam Mitchell). On 4 February, the Raptors' 122–110 home win against the Los Angeles Clippers represented a season-high in points for the Raptors. Within the same week, Bosh's career-high 41 points in a win against the Orlando Magic prompted an unheard of event at the Air Canada Centre—chants of "MVP" by the home fans. This chant was repeated in a win against Vince Carter's New Jersey Nets ten days later—to the disbelief of Carter—a game which also saw the team break franchise records for the most home wins and highest home winning percentage entering the All-Star break.

After the break, Colangelo traded Jones for Juan Dixon, a versatile guard. Luke Jackson was also signed to provide depth to Toronto's bench. Following a win against the Charlotte Bobcats on 1 April 2007, Toronto clinched a playoff berth for the first time in five years. They then claimed their first division title when they defeated the Philadelphia 76ers five days later, winning the Atlantic Division crown. Another franchise record was set when Toronto won the next game against the Bulls, this time for most home wins.

The Raptors were eventually seeded third in the Eastern Conference, marking one of the biggest turnarounds in NBA history in terms of league standing and defensive ranking. Throughout the season, they were lauded for playing solid defense and good sharing and moving of the ball. José Calderón, Bargnani, Dixon and Morris Peterson turned in reliable performances from the bench while Ford and Bosh ran the offence with consistent numbers. And in Parker and Garbajosa, the Raptors had two very versatile players who could both defend and attack. Furthermore, in contrast to previous seasons, the Raptors were able to win games despite injuries to key players such as Bosh, Bargnani, Parker, Ford and Garbajosa. Colangelo, Gherardini and Mitchell were also largely credited for transforming Toronto's fortunes.

=== Standings ===
Atlantic Division	W	L	PCT	GB	Home	Road	Div
y-Toronto Raptors	47	35	.573	-	30–11	17–24	11–5
x-New Jersey Nets	41	41	.500	6	24–17	17–24	10–6
Philadelphia 76ers	35	47	.427	12	21–20	14–27	9–7
New York Knicks	33	49	.402	14	19–22	14–27	3–13
Boston Celtics	24	58	.293	23	12–29	12–29	7–9

#	Eastern Conference				
#	Team	W	L	PCT	GB
1	c-Detroit Pistons	53	29	.646	–
2	x-Cleveland Cavaliers	50	32	.610	3
3	y-Toronto Raptors	47	35	.573	6
4	y-Miami Heat	44	38	.537	9
5	x-Chicago Bulls	49	33	.598	4
6	x-New Jersey Nets	41	41	.500	12
7	x-Washington Wizards	41	41	.500	12
8	x-Orlando Magic	40	42	.488	13
9	Philadelphia 76ers	35	47	.427	18
10	Indiana Pacers	35	47	.427	18
11	New York Knicks	33	49	.402	20
12	Charlotte Bobcats	33	49	.402	20
13	Atlanta Hawks	30	52	.366	23
14	Milwaukee Bucks	28	54	.341	25
15	Boston Celtics	24	58	.293	29

== Playoffs ==
As third seed, the Raptors played sixth seed New Jersey Nets in the first round of the 2007 NBA Playoffs. The series drew much media attention as Vince Carter, a former Raptor who left Toronto under acrimonious circumstances two seasons ago, was now back at the ACC as a Net. In the opening game, while Carter was constantly booed by the home crowd and was not an offensive threat, Toronto's inexperience was evident as they too struggled offensively and were down 65–78 going into the fourth quarter. A late rally by Toronto in the fourth quarter was not enough as they eventually lost 91–96. The Raptors won game 2 89–83 at the ACC to tie the series 1–1, as Bosh recorded 25 points and a game-high 13 rebounds. The Nets won games 3 and 4 to lead 3–1, but Toronto forced a game 6 when they narrowly won 98–96 in game 5. In that game, the Raptors set two post-season franchise records: most points going into halftime and biggest lead for a half. The attendance for the game was also a franchise record for a playoff game. In game 6, however, New Jersey won 98–97, sealing the series 4–2 and sending Toronto out of the first round.

In recognition of being the chief architects of Toronto's turnaround season, on 24 April 2007, Mitchell was named 2006–07 NBA Coach of the Year, the first Raptors coach to receive this honour; Colangelo was later named 2006–07 Executive of the Year.

== Game log ==
2006–07 game log
November: 5–10 (home: 4–2; road: 1–8)

Game	Date	Team	Score	High points	High rebounds	High assists	Location Attendance	Record
1	November 1	@ New Jersey	L 92–102	Anthony Parker (22)	Chris Bosh, T. J. Ford, Jorge Garbajosa, Morris Peterson (5)	T. J. Ford (7)	Continental Airlines Arena; 18,646	0–1
2	November 3	Milwaukee	W 109–92	Chris Bosh (26)	Chris Bosh (15)	T. J. Ford (11)	Air Canada Centre; 19,832	1–1
3	November 5	San Antonio	L 94–103	Chris Bosh (19)	Chris Bosh (17)	T. J. Ford (5)	Air Canada Centre; 18,098	1–2
4	November 8	Philadelphia	W 106–104	Chris Bosh (29)	Chris Bosh (44)	T. J. Ford (7)	Air Canada Centre; 15,831	2–2
5	November 10	Atlanta	L 102–111	Chris Bosh (19)	Chris Bosh (17)	T. J. Ford (11)	Air Canada Centre; 14,680	2–3
6	November 12	@ Sacramento	L 92–107	Chris Bosh (19)	Chris Bosh (7)	T. J. Ford (7)	ARCO Arena; 17,317	2–4
7	November 14	@ Golden State	L 99–110	Chris Bosh (23)	Chris Bosh (22)	T. J. Ford (6)	Oracle Arena; 16,182	2–5
8	November 17	@ L.A. Lakers	L 100–107	Chris Bosh, Morris Peterson (20)	Chris Bosh (10)	T. J. Ford, Fred Jones (6)	Staples Center; 18,997	2–6
9	November 18	@ Denver	L 109–117	Chris Bosh (31)	Jorge Garbajosa (10)	T. J. Ford (18)	Pepsi Center; 15,531	2–7
10	November 20	@ Utah	L 96–101	Chris Bosh (17)	Chris Bosh (11)	T. J. Ford (5)	EnergySolutions Arena; 18,881	2–8
11	November 22	Cleveland	W 95–87	Chris Bosh (25)	Chris Bosh (14)	Chris Bosh (6)	Air Canada Centre; 19,800	3–8
12	November 24	@ Atlanta	L 93–97	T. J. Ford (25)	Jorge Garbajosa (12)	T. J. Ford (12)	Philips Arena; 16,630	3–9
13	November 26	Indiana	W 92–83	Chris Bosh (17)	Chris Bosh (11)	T. J. Ford (6)	Air Canada Centre; 18,075	4–9
14	November 28	@ New Orleans/Oklahoma City	W 94–77	Chris Bosh, Anthony Parker (19)	Chris Bosh (14)	José Calderón (4)	Ford Center; 15,647	5–9
15	November 29	@ Dallas	L 98–117	Chris Bosh, T. J. Ford (18)	Chris Bosh (11)	José Calderón (4)	American Airlines Center; 19,975	5–10

December: 8–8 (home: 4–2; road: 4–6)

Game	Date	Team	Score	High points	High rebounds	High assists	Location Attendance	Record
16	December 1	Boston	W 106–102	Chris Bosh (25)	Chris Bosh (11)	T. J. Ford (13)	Air Canada Centre; 16,562	6–10
17	December 2	@ New York	W 103–100	Chris Bosh (26)	Chris Bosh (13)	T. J. Ford (10)	Madison Square Garden; 17,525	7–10
18	December 6	@ Cleveland	L 91–95	Chris Bosh, Anthony Parker (18)	Chris Bosh (12)	T. J. Ford (10)	Quicken Loans Arena; 20,119	7–11
19	December 8	@ Chicago	L 90–93	Jorge Garbajosa (17)	Chris Bosh (12)	José Calderón (8)	United Center; 21,797	7–12
20	December 10	Portland	L 83–93	Morris Peterson (23)	Jorge Garbajosa (7)	T. J. Ford (6)	Air Canada Centre; 15,542	7–13
21	December 11	@ Miami	L 77–99	Anthony Parker (18)	Kris Humphries (7)	T. J. Ford (12)	American Airlines Arena; 19,600	7–14
22	December 13	@ Orlando	W 91–84	Andrea Bargnani (23)	Radoslav Nesterović (10)	T. J. Ford (5)	Amway Arena; 15,417	8–14
23	December 15	New Jersey	W 90–78	T. J. Ford (17)	T. J. Ford, Joey Graham (9)	T. J. Ford (8)	Air Canada Centre; 19,897	9–14
24	December 17	Golden State	W 120–115	Morris Peterson (23)	Jorge Garbajosa (11)	T. J. Ford (14)	Air Canada Centre; 16,035	10–14
25	December 19	@ Phoenix	L 98–115	T. J. Ford (19)	P. J. Tucker (9)	T. J. Ford (9)	US Airways Center; 18,422	10–15
26	December 20	@ L.A. Clippers	W 98–96	Fred Jones (23)	Andrea Bargnani, Radoslav Nesterović (7)	T. J. Ford (9)	Staples Center; 17,962	11–15
27	December 22	@ Portland	W 101–100 (OT)	T. J. Ford (23)	Anthony Parker (8)	T. J. Ford (10)	Rose Garden; 15,220	12–15
28	December 23	@ Seattle	L 97–110	T. J. Ford (24)	Jorge Garbajosa, Radoslav Nesterović (7)	José Calderón (10)	KeyArena; 14,611	12–16
29	December 27	Minnesota	W 100–97	T. J. Ford (28)	Jorge Garbajosa (10)	T. J. Ford (7)	Air Canada Centre; 19,800	13–16
30	December 29	Chicago	L 97–107	T. J. Ford (20)	Radoslav Nesterović (8)	Jorge Garbajosa (7)	Air Canada Centre; 19,800	13–17
31	December 30	@ Memphis	L 104–110	Morris Peterson (19)	Radoslav Nesterović (9)	Darrick Martin (10)	FedExForum; 15,119	13–18

January: 10–5 (home: 7–3; road: 3–2)

Game	Date	Team	Score	High points	High rebounds	High assists	Location Attendance	Record
32	January 3	Phoenix	L 98–100	Chris Bosh (26)	Chris Bosh (14)	José Calderón (6)	Air Canada Centre; 20,063	13–19
33	January 5	Atlanta	W 105–92	Chris Bosh (21)	Radoslav Nesterović (9)	José Calderón (12)	Air Canada Centre; 17,977	14–19
34	January 7	Washington	W 116–111	Chris Bosh (24)	Chris Bosh (15)	Anthony Parker (6)	Air Canada Centre; 17,981	15–19
35	January 9	@ New Jersey	L 86–101	Andrea Bargnani (22)	Chris Bosh (6)	José Calderón (12)	Continental Airlines Arena; 14,729	15–20
36	January 10	@ Milwaukee	W 90–77	Chris Bosh (30)	Chris Bosh (8)	T. J. Ford (10)	Bradley Center; 16,432	16–20
37	January 12	@ Boston	W 95–86	Chris Bosh (27)	Chris Bosh, Radoslav Nesterović (8)	T. J. Ford (6)	TD Banknorth Garden; 17,191	17–20
38	January 14	Dallas	L 96–97	Chris Bosh (24)	Chris Bosh (15)	T. J. Ford (8)	Air Canada Centre; 19,800	17–21
39	January 15	@ Philadelphia	W 104–86	Chris Bosh (27)	Chris Bosh, Anthony Parker (6)	T. J. Ford (10)	Wachovia Center; 12,380	18–21
40	January 17	Sacramento	W 101–85	Morris Peterson (22)	Chris Bosh (9)	José Calderón (9)	Air Canada Centre; 15,175	19–21
41	January 19	Utah	L 94–102	Chris Bosh (29)	Chris Bosh (11)	T. J. Ford, Anthony Parker (6)	Air Canada Centre; 17,384	19–22
42	January 22	Charlotte	W 105–84	Chris Bosh (20)	Joey Graham (9)	José Calderón (11)	Air Canada Centre; 13,997	20–22
43	January 24	New Orleans/Oklahoma City	W 90–88	Chris Bosh (35)	Anthony Parker (9)	José Calderón (8)	Air Canada Centre; 14,173	21–22
44	January 26	Boston	W 96–90	Chris Bosh (26)	Chris Bosh, Jorge Garbajosa (8)	José Calderón (8)	Air Canada Centre; 18,565	22–22
45	January 27	@ Indiana	L 84–102	Chris Bosh (26)	Chris Bosh (12)	José Calderón (10)	Conseco Fieldhouse; 14,263	22–23
46	January 31	Washington	W 119–109	Chris Bosh (34)	Chris Bosh (8)	José Calderón (11)	Air Canada Centre; 16,145	23–23

February: 9–3 (home: 5–1; road: 4–2)

Game	Date	Team	Score	High points	High rebounds	High assists	Location Attendance	Record
47	February 2	@ Atlanta	W 103–91	Chris Bosh (24)	Chris Bosh (10)	T. J. Ford (10)	Philips Arena; 13,200	24–23
48	February 4	L.A. Clippers	W 122–110	Chris Bosh (27)	Chris Bosh (7)	José Calderón (12)	Air Canada Centre; 17,214	25–23
49	February 7	Orlando	W 113–103	Chris Bosh (41)	Chris Bosh (8)	José Calderón, T. J. Ford (11)	Air Canada Centre; 15,157	26–23
50	February 9	L.A. Lakers	W 96–92	Chris Bosh (29)	Chris Bosh (11)	T. J. Ford (7)	Air Canada Centre; 20,012	27–23
51	February 10	@ Detroit	L 92–98	T. J. Ford (17)	Chris Bosh (11)	T. J. Ford (11)	The Palace of Auburn Hills; 22,076	27–24
52	February 13	@ Chicago	W 112–111	Chris Bosh (25)	Chris Bosh (14)	José Calderón (9)	United Center; 21,776	28–24
53	February 14	New Jersey	W 120–109	Chris Bosh (25)	Chris Bosh (9)	T. J. Ford (8)	Air Canada Centre; 19,800	29–24
54	February 21	Cleveland	L 85–86	Chris Bosh (24)	Chris Bosh (10)	T. J. Ford (9)	Air Canada Centre; 19,800	29–25
55	February 23	Indiana	W 110–88	Chris Bosh (23)	Chris Bosh (12)	José Calderón (12)	Air Canada Centre; 19,481	30–25
56	February 24	@ Charlotte	W 93–76	Chris Bosh (24)	Andrea Bargnani, Chris Bosh (11)	T. J. Ford (4)	Charlotte Bobcats Arena; 17,091	31–25
57	February 26	@ San Antonio	L 91–107	Andrea Bargnani (17)	Chris Bosh, Radoslav Nesterović (9)	José Calderón (8)	AT&T Center; 18,563	31–26
58	February 28	@ Houston	W 106–90	Andrea Bargnani (20)	Chris Bosh (9)	Chris Bosh, José Calderón, T. J. Ford (6)	Toyota Center; 14,071	32–26

March: 8–6 (home: 6–2; road: 2–4)

Game	Date	Team	Score	High points	High rebounds	High assists	Location Attendance	Record
59	March 2	Milwaukee	L 81–94	Andrea Bargnani (16)	Chris Bosh (10)	T. J. Ford (9)	Air Canada Centre; 18,816	32–27
60	March 3	@ Cleveland	L 97–120	Chris Bosh (25)	T. J. Ford (7)	T. J. Ford (7)	Quicken Loans Arena; 20,562	32–28
61	March 6	@ Washington	L 109–129	Chris Bosh (25)	Kris Humphries (5)	T. J. Ford (6)	Verizon Center; 15,529	32–29
62	March 7	Memphis	W 94–87	Chris Bosh (19)	Chris Bosh (9)	José Calderón (9)	Air Canada Centre; 16,940	33–29
63	March 11	Seattle	W 120–119 (OT)	Chris Bosh (27)	Chris Bosh (10)	T. J. Ford (13)	Air Canada Centre; 19,800	34–29
64	March 12	@ Milwaukee	W 108–93	Chris Bosh (25)	Chris Bosh (10)	T. J. Ford (9)	Bradley Center; 13,411	35–29
65	March 14	New York	W 104–94	Chris Bosh (22)	Chris Bosh (8)	T. J. Ford (18)	Air Canada Centre; 19,800	36–29
66	March 16	Houston	L 100–114	T. J. Ford (18)	Chris Bosh (19)	T. J. Ford (8)	Air Canada Centre; 20,102	36–30
67	March 18	@ New York	L 74–92	Chris Bosh (21)	Kris Humphries (9)	T. J. Ford (3)	Madison Square Garden; 19,763	36–31
68	March 21	Orlando	W 92–85	Chris Bosh (34)	Chris Bosh (16)	T. J. Ford (12)	Air Canada Centre; 18,326	37–31
69	March 23	Denver	W 121–94	Morris Peterson (23)	Jorge Garbajosa (9)	T. J. Ford (14)	Air Canada Centre; 20,120	38–31
70	March 26	@ Boston	L 87–95	T. J. Ford (28)	Chris Bosh (11)	T. J. Ford (9)	TD Banknorth Garden; 14,708	38–32
71	March 28	Miami	W 96–83	Anthony Parker (20)	Chris Bosh (18)	T. J. Ford (9)	Air Canada Centre; 19,800	39–32
72	March 30	@ Washington	W 123–118 (OT)	Chris Bosh (37)	Chris Bosh (14)	José Calderón (8)	Verizon Center; 20,173	40–32

April: 7–3 (home: 4–1; road: 3–2)

Game	Date	Team	Score	High points	High rebounds	High assists	Location Attendance	Record
73	April 1	Charlotte	W 107–94	Chris Bosh (24)	Chris Bosh (16)	T. J. Ford (8)	Air Canada Centre; 19,023	41–32
74	April 3	@ Miami	L 89–92	Chris Bosh (24)	Chris Bosh (11)	T. J. Ford (7)	American Airlines Arena; 19,600	41–33
75	April 4	@ Orlando	W 111–108	Chris Bosh (28)	Chris Bosh (10)	T. J. Ford (8)	Amway Arena; 16,911	42–33
76	April 6	@ Philadelphia	W 94–85	Chris Bosh (23)	Chris Bosh (13)	José Calderón, T. J. Ford (6)	Wachovia Center; 17,566	43–33
77	April 8	Chicago	W 103–89	Anthony Parker (27)	Chris Bosh (11)	José Calderón (8)	Air Canada Centre; 19,800	44–33
78	April 9	@ Minnesota	W 111–100	Anthony Parker (24)	Chris Bosh (13)	T. J. Ford (10)	Target Center; 15,561	45–33
79	April 13	Detroit	W 87–84	Anthony Parker (21)	Kris Humphries (18)	T. J. Ford (10)	Air Canada Centre; 19,800	46–33
80	April 15	New York	W 107–105	Chris Bosh (23)	Chris Bosh (8)	Chris Bosh (7)	Air Canada Centre; 19,800	47–33
81	April 17	@ Detroit	L 84–100	Uroš Slokar (18)	Morris Peterson (13)	Darrick Martin (8)	The Palace of Auburn Hills; 22,076	47–34
82	April 18	Philadelphia	L 119–122	Luke Jackson (30)	Chris Bosh (9)	T. J. Ford (10)	Air Canada Centre; 19,800	47–35

2006–07 season schedule

=== Playoffs ===
2007 playoff game log
First Round: 2–4 (home: 2–1; road: 0–3)

Game	Date	Team	Score	High points	High rebounds	High assists	Location Attendance	Record
1	April 21	New Jersey	L 91–96	Chris Bosh (22)	Rasho Nesterovič (10)	José Calderón (8)	Air Canada Centre; 20,330	0–1
2	April 24	New Jersey	W 89–83	Anthony Parker (26)	Chris Bosh (13)	T. J. Ford (6)	Air Canada Centre; 20,239	1–1
3	April 27	@ New Jersey	L 89–102	T. J. Ford (27)	Chris Bosh (11)	T. J. Ford (8)	Continental Airlines Arena; 17,147	1–2
4	April 29	@ New Jersey	L 81–102	Andrea Bargnani (16)	Chris Bosh (10)	T. J. Ford (5)	Continental Airlines Arena; 20,032	1–3
5	May 1	New Jersey	W 98–96	José Calderón (25)	Joey Graham (10)	José Calderón (8)	Air Canada Centre; 20,511	2–3
6	May 4	@ New Jersey	L 97–98	Chris Bosh (23)	Morris Peterson (8)	Chris Bosh (9)	Continental Airlines Arena; 17,242	2–4

2007 playoff schedule

== Player statistics ==
=== Regular season ===
Player	POS	GP	GS	MP	REB	AST	STL	BLK	PTS	MPG	RPG	APG	SPG	BPG	PPG
Rasho Nesterović	C	80	73	1,676	360	74	37	84	494	21.0	4.5	.9	.5	1.1	6.2
Joey Graham	SF	79	21	1,319	248	44	30	4	503	16.7	3.1	.6	.4	.1	6.4
José Calderón	PG	77	11	1,614	134	387	63	5	668	21.0	1.7	5.0	.8	.1	8.7
T. J. Ford	PG	75	71	2,243	236	595	101	8	1,047	29.9	3.1	7.9	1.3	.1	14.0
Anthony Parker	SG	73	73	2,437	283	153	73	11	903	33.4	3.9	2.1	1.0	.2	12.4
Morris Peterson	SF	71	12	1,515	237	47	45	12	634	21.3	3.3	.7	.6	.2	8.9
Chris Bosh	C	69	69	2,658	741	175	39	90	1,561	38.5	10.7	2.5	.6	1.3	22.6
Jorge Garbajosa	PF	67	60	1,909	330	125	78	15	567	28.5	4.9	1.9	1.2	.2	8.5
Andrea Bargnani	PF	65	2	1,629	255	50	32	53	751	25.1	3.9	.8	.5	.8	11.6
Kris Humphries	PF	60	2	670	187	18	14	21	227	11.2	3.1	.3	.2	.4	3.8
Fred Jones^{†}	SG	39	9	870	82	55	30	12	297	22.3	2.1	1.4	.8	.3	7.6
Darrick Martin	PG	31	0	220	12	43	3	0	94	7.1	.4	1.4	.1	.0	3.0
Juan Dixon^{†}	SG	26	5	683	73	41	27	2	288	26.3	2.8	1.6	1.0	.1	11.1
Uroš Slokar	C	20	0	72	14	1	1	2	38	3.6	.7	.1	.1	.1	1.9
P. J. Tucker	SF	17	0	83	23	3	2	0	30	4.9	1.4	.2	.1	.0	1.8
Luke Jackson^{†}	SF	10	2	122	9	9	5	1	45	12.2	.9	.9	.5	.1	4.5
Pape Sow	C	7	0	34	11	2	1	1	10	4.9	1.6	.3	.1	.1	1.4

- ^{†} Denotes player spent time with another team in the season. Stats reflect time with the Raptors only.

=== Playoffs ===
Player	POS	GP	GS	MP	REB	AST	STL	BLK	PTS	MPG	RPG	APG	SPG	BPG	PPG
Anthony Parker	SG	6	6	240	32	6	9	2	91	40.0	5.3	1.0	1.5	.3	15.2
Chris Bosh	C	6	6	222	54	15	5	11	105	37.0	9.0	2.5	.8	1.8	17.5
T. J. Ford	PG	6	5	136	10	24	7	2	96	22.7	1.7	4.0	1.2	.3	16.0
Andrea Bargnani	PF	6	3	181	24	6	5	3	66	30.2	4.0	1.0	.8	.5	11.0
Joey Graham	SF	6	3	109	20	2	4	0	16	18.2	3.3	.3	.7	.0	2.7
Morris Peterson	SF	6	2	183	27	2	2	2	41	30.5	4.5	.3	.3	.3	6.8
José Calderón	PG	6	1	146	10	32	5	0	78	24.3	1.7	5.3	.8	.0	13.0
Kris Humphries	PF	6	0	69	17	1	1	2	9	11.5	2.8	.2	.2	.3	1.5
Juan Dixon	SG	6	0	63	4	3	7	0	18	10.5	.7	.5	1.2	.0	3.0
Rasho Nesterović	C	5	4	71	23	3	0	2	17	14.2	4.6	.6	.0	.4	3.4
Luke Jackson	SF	3	0	11	5	1	1	0	6	3.7	1.7	.3	.3	.0	2.0
Darrick Martin	PG	2	0	8	1	2	0	0	2	4.0	.5	1.0	.0	.0	1.0
