= 2006–07 NBA season =

61st NBA season

- League: National Basketball Association
- Sport: Basketball
- Duration: October 31, 2006 – April 18, 2007; April 21 – June 2, 2007 (Playoffs); June 7 – 14, 2007 (Finals)
- Games: 82
- Teams: 30
- TV partner(s): ABC, TNT, ESPN, NBA TV

Draft
- Top draft pick: Andrea Bargnani
- Picked by: Toronto Raptors

Regular season
- Top seed: Dallas Mavericks
- Season MVP: Dirk Nowitzki (Dallas)
- Top scorer: Kobe Bryant (L.A. Lakers)

Playoffs
- Eastern champions: Cleveland Cavaliers
- Eastern runners-up: Detroit Pistons
- Western champions: San Antonio Spurs
- Western runners-up: Utah Jazz

Finals
- Champions: San Antonio Spurs
- Runners-up: Cleveland Cavaliers
- Finals MVP: Tony Parker (San Antonio)

NBA seasons
- ← 2005–06 2007–08 →

The 2006–07 NBA season was the 61st season of the National Basketball Association (NBA). The San Antonio Spurs were crowned the champions after sweeping the Cleveland Cavaliers in the NBA Finals.

== Notable occurrences ==
- The first NBA draft under the new CBA rules was conducted, where draftees must be at least a year removed from high school graduation and are at least 19 years old to be eligible. Andrea Bargnani of Italy was selected by the Toronto Raptors as the No. 1 pick, becoming the second foreign player without U.S. collegiate basketball background to be selected No. 1. Portland Trail Blazers guard Brandon Roy was named Rookie of the Year.
- A new design for the official NBA game ball was revealed on June 28, 2006, at the NBA draft. Amid complaints by players and coaches, the league switched back to the previous ball on January 1, 2007.
- The 2007 NBA All-Star Game was played on February 18, 2007, at the Thomas & Mack Center in Las Vegas, Nevada, the first time the event was held in a non-NBA city. The West defeated the East 153–132, with Kobe Bryant winning the game's MVP award.
- For the second straight year, the Hornets played a split home schedule between New Orleans, Louisiana, and Oklahoma City, Oklahoma, due to Hurricane Katrina.
- The Denver Nuggets and the New York Knicks entered into a brawl near the end of a December 16 match up. All ten players on the court at the time, including Nuggets star Carmelo Anthony (the league's leading scorer at the time), were ejected. Seven players were suspended as a result of the incident, the most notable of which was Carmelo Anthony's 15-game suspension.
- After 11 seasons with the Philadelphia 76ers, All-Star guard Allen Iverson was traded to the Denver Nuggets with rookie Ivan McFarlin for Andre Miller and Joe Smith.
- After the 2006 Playoff controversy, the format of team seeds changed. Each division winner may be seeded no lower than 4th, but the top non-division-winning playoff team may seed higher than a divisional champ if they have a better win–loss record. Home court advantage is given to the team with the better record, regardless of seeding.
- The Phoenix Suns and the Dallas Mavericks notched multiple 12+ game win-streaks during the course of the regular season. The Suns rattled off streaks of 15 and 17 games straight (tied for fifth longest in NBA history), while the Mavericks' streaks stretched to 12, 13, and 17 games straight. The San Antonio Spurs joined these two teams by notching a 13-game winning streak.
- Kobe Bryant notched four consecutive 50+ point games against the Portland Trail Blazers, Minnesota Timberwolves, Memphis Grizzlies and New Orleans/Oklahoma City Hornets; his streak ranks fourth behind streaks by Wilt Chamberlain. He also changed number from 8 to 24 this season.
- Jason Kidd and Vince Carter of the New Jersey Nets become only the tenth pair of teammates in NBA history to record triple doubles in the same game. Nearly 20 years had passed since the last tandem, Michael Jordan and Scottie Pippen, performed this feat.
- The Toronto Raptors won their first division title in the franchise's twelve-year history. It also marked the first time a Canadian-based NBA team had won a division title.
- The Golden State Warriors, who had not qualified for the playoffs since 1994, became the first 8 seed to defeat a 1 seed in a best-of-seven playoff series, defeating the 67-win Dallas Mavericks in 6 games.
- Dirk Nowitzki won the NBA MVP Award and Tony Parker won the NBA Finals MVP Award, the first time either award was won by a European-born player.
- Long-time Boston Celtics coach and executive Red Auerbach died on October 28 of heart attack at age 89. Reeling with the loss of their patriarch, and being down two key contributors in Paul Pierce and Tony Allen, the Celtics finished the season with the second-worst record in the NBA, at 24–58, which included a franchise record 18–game losing streak. Another Celtics legend, Dennis Johnson, died on February 22, 2007, of the same ailment at age 52. This led to them acquiring both Kevin Garnett and Ray Allen, the following season, to turn their franchise around to a 42–game improvement that followed suit for the next five seasons for the three players.
- The 2007 NBA Finals, won by the San Antonio Spurs 4–0 over the Cleveland Cavaliers, was the least-watched Finals series in NBA History until the 2020 NBA Finals, with a rating of 6.2.
- Adidas became the official outfitter of the NBA they remained for the next ten years until Nike became the official outfitter in 2017.
- As of 2025, this was the last season a LeBron James led team did not participate in the Christmas Day games.

=== Coaching changes ===
Offseason
| Team | 2005–06 coach | 2006–07 coach |
|---|---|---|
| Golden State Warriors | Mike Montgomery | Don Nelson |
| New York Knicks | Larry Brown | Isiah Thomas |
| Sacramento Kings | Rick Adelman | Eric Musselman |
In-season
| Team | Outgoing coach | Incoming coach |
| Memphis Grizzlies | Mike Fratello | Tony Barone |
| Milwaukee Bucks | Terry Stotts | Larry Krystkowiak |
| Minnesota Timberwolves | Dwane Casey | Randy Wittman |

== 2006–07 NBA changes ==
- Boston Celtics – slightly changed their uniforms added their alternate logo of a cloverleaf above the jersey.
- Milwaukee Bucks – added new logo and new uniforms, replacing dark green, purple, grey and silver with remained dark green, grey and silver, added red to their color scheme added side panels to their jerseys and shorts.
- New Jersey Nets – added new red road alternate uniforms with dark navy blue side panels to their jerseys and shorts.
- New York Knicks – added new green road alternate uniforms with black side panels to their jerseys and shorts for St. Patrick's day only.
- Utah Jazz – added new light blue road alternate uniforms with dark navy blue side panels to their jerseys and shorts.
- Toronto Raptors – red road alternate uniforms they wore for the past three seasons became their primary road jersey.
- Washington Wizards – added new gold and black road alternate uniforms with stars to their jerseys and shorts.

== Final standings ==
=== By division ===
Eastern Conference

| Atlantic Division | W | L | PCT | GB | Home | Road | Div |
|---|---|---|---|---|---|---|---|
| y-Toronto Raptors | 47 | 35 | .573 | - | 30–11 | 17–24 | 11–5 |
| x-New Jersey Nets | 41 | 41 | .500 | 6 | 24–17 | 17–24 | 10–6 |
| Philadelphia 76ers | 35 | 47 | .427 | 12 | 21–20 | 14–27 | 9–7 |
| New York Knicks | 33 | 49 | .402 | 14 | 19–22 | 14–27 | 3–13 |
| Boston Celtics | 24 | 58 | .293 | 23 | 12–29 | 12–29 | 7–9 |

| Central Division | W | L | PCT | GB | Home | Road | Div |
|---|---|---|---|---|---|---|---|
| y-Detroit Pistons | 53 | 29 | .646 | - | 26–15 | 27–14 | 9–7 |
| x-Cleveland Cavaliers | 50 | 32 | .610 | 3 | 30–11 | 20–21 | 10–6 |
| x-Chicago Bulls | 49 | 33 | .598 | 4 | 31–10 | 18–23 | 12–4 |
| Indiana Pacers | 35 | 47 | .427 | 18 | 22–19 | 13–28 | 8–8 |
| Milwaukee Bucks | 28 | 54 | .341 | 25 | 18–23 | 10–31 | 1–15 |

| Southeast Division | W | L | PCT | GB | Home | Road | Div |
|---|---|---|---|---|---|---|---|
| y-Miami Heat | 44 | 38 | .537 | - | 27–14 | 17–24 | 9–7 |
| x-Washington Wizards | 41 | 41 | .500 | 3 | 26–15 | 15–26 | 8–8 |
| x-Orlando Magic | 40 | 42 | .488 | 4 | 25–16 | 15–26 | 9–7 |
| Charlotte Bobcats | 33 | 49 | .402 | 11 | 20–21 | 13–28 | 9–7 |
| Atlanta Hawks | 30 | 52 | .366 | 14 | 18–23 | 12–29 | 5–11 |

Western Conference

| Northwest Division | W | L | PCT | GB | Home | Road | Div |
|---|---|---|---|---|---|---|---|
| y-Utah Jazz | 51 | 31 | .634 | - | 31–10 | 20–21 | 10–6 |
| x-Denver Nuggets | 45 | 37 | .549 | 6 | 23–18 | 22–19 | 9–7 |
| Portland Trail Blazers | 32 | 50 | .390 | 19 | 18–23 | 14–27 | 7–9 |
| Minnesota Timberwolves | 32 | 50 | .390 | 19 | 20–21 | 12–29 | 6–10 |
| Seattle SuperSonics | 31 | 51 | .378 | 20 | 20–21 | 11–30 | 8–8 |

| Pacific Division | W | L | PCT | GB | Home | Road | Div |
|---|---|---|---|---|---|---|---|
| y-Phoenix Suns | 61 | 21 | .744 | - | 33–8 | 28–13 | 11–5 |
| x-Los Angeles Lakers | 42 | 40 | .512 | 19 | 25–16 | 17–24 | 10–6 |
| x-Golden State Warriors | 42 | 40 | .512 | 19 | 30–11 | 12–29 | 6–10 |
| Los Angeles Clippers | 40 | 42 | .488 | 21 | 25–16 | 15–26 | 8–8 |
| Sacramento Kings | 33 | 49 | .402 | 28 | 20–21 | 13–28 | 5–11 |

| Southwest Division | W | L | PCT | GB | Home | Road | Div |
|---|---|---|---|---|---|---|---|
| z-Dallas Mavericks | 67 | 15 | .817 | - | 36–5 | 31–10 | 14–2 |
| x-San Antonio Spurs | 58 | 24 | .707 | 9 | 31–10 | 27–14 | 10–6 |
| x-Houston Rockets | 52 | 30 | .634 | 15 | 28–13 | 24–17 | 8–8 |
| New Orleans/Oklahoma City Hornets | 39 | 43 | .476 | 28 | 24–17 | 15–26 | 6–10 |
| Memphis Grizzlies | 22 | 60 | .268 | 45 | 14–27 | 8–33 | 2–14 |

=== By conference ===
| # | Eastern Conference | | | | |
| # | Team | W | L | PCT | GB |
|---|---|---|---|---|---|
| 1 | c-Detroit Pistons | 53 | 29 | .646 | – |
| 2 | x-Cleveland Cavaliers | 50 | 32 | .610 | 3 |
| 3 | y-Toronto Raptors | 47 | 35 | .573 | 6 |
| 4 | y-Miami Heat | 44 | 38 | .537 | 9 |
| 5 | x-Chicago Bulls | 49 | 33 | .598 | 4 |
| 6 | x-New Jersey Nets | 41 | 41 | .500 | 12 |
| 7 | x-Washington Wizards | 41 | 41 | .500 | 12 |
| 8 | x-Orlando Magic | 40 | 42 | .488 | 13 |
| 9 | Philadelphia 76ers | 35 | 47 | .427 | 18 |
| 10 | Indiana Pacers | 35 | 47 | .427 | 18 |
| 11 | New York Knicks | 33 | 49 | .402 | 20 |
| 12 | Charlotte Bobcats | 33 | 49 | .402 | 20 |
| 13 | Atlanta Hawks | 30 | 52 | .366 | 23 |
| 14 | Milwaukee Bucks | 28 | 54 | .341 | 25 |
| 15 | Boston Celtics | 24 | 58 | .293 | 29 |

| # | Western Conference | | | | |
| # | Team | W | L | PCT | GB |
|---|---|---|---|---|---|
| 1 | z-Dallas Mavericks | 67 | 15 | .817 | - |
| 2 | y-Phoenix Suns | 61 | 21 | .744 | 6 |
| 3 | x-San Antonio Spurs | 58 | 24 | .707 | 9 |
| 4 | y-Utah Jazz | 51 | 31 | .622 | 16 |
| 5 | x-Houston Rockets | 52 | 30 | .634 | 15 |
| 6 | x-Denver Nuggets | 45 | 37 | .549 | 22 |
| 7 | x-Los Angeles Lakers | 42 | 40 | .512 | 25 |
| 8 | x-Golden State Warriors | 42 | 40 | .512 | 25 |
| 9 | Los Angeles Clippers | 40 | 42 | .488 | 27 |
| 10 | New Orleans/Oklahoma City Hornets | 39 | 43 | .476 | 28 |
| 11 | Sacramento Kings | 33 | 49 | .402 | 34 |
| 12 | Portland Trail Blazers | 32 | 50 | .390 | 35 |
| 13 | Minnesota Timberwolves | 32 | 50 | .390 | 35 |
| 14 | Seattle SuperSonics | 31 | 51 | .378 | 36 |
| 15 | Memphis Grizzlies | 22 | 60 | .268 | 45 |

== Playoffs ==
Teams in bold advanced to the next round. The numbers to the left of each team indicate the team's seeding in its conference, and the numbers to the right indicate the number of games the team won in that round. The division champions are marked by an asterisk. Home court advantage does not necessarily belong to the higher-seeded team, but instead the team with the better regular season record; teams enjoying the home advantage are shown in italics

First Round | Conference Semifinals
**E1** | **Detroit*** | **4**
E8 | Orlando | 0
**E1** | **Detroit*** | **4**
E5 | Chicago | 2
E4 | Miami* | 0
**E5** | **Chicago** | **4**
**Eastern Conference**
E3 | Toronto* | 2
**E6** | **New Jersey** | **4**
E6 | New Jersey | 2
**E2** | **Cleveland** | **4**
**E2** | **Cleveland** | **4**
E7 | Washington | 0
W1 | Dallas* | 2
**W8** | **Golden State** | **4**
W8 | Golden State | 1
**W4** | **Utah*** | **4**
**W4** | **Utah*** | **4**
W5 | Houston | 3
**Western Conference**
**W3** | **San Antonio** | **4**
W6 | Denver | 1
**W3** | **San Antonio** | **4**
W2 | Phoenix* | 2
**W2** | **Phoenix*** | **4**
W7 | LA Lakers | 1

Conference Finals
E1 | Detroit* | 2
**E2** | **Cleveland** | **4**
W4 | Utah* | 1
**W3** | **San Antonio** | **4**

NBA Finals
E2 | Cleveland | 0
**W3** | **San Antonio** | **4**

- * Division winner
- **Bold** Series winner
- Italic Team with home-court advantage

== Statistics leaders ==
| Category | Player | Team | Stat |
|---|---|---|---|
| Points per game | Kobe Bryant | Los Angeles Lakers | 31.6 |
| Rebounds per game | Kevin Garnett | Minnesota Timberwolves | 12.8 |
| Assists per game | Steve Nash | Phoenix Suns | 11.6 |
| Steals per game | Baron Davis | Golden State Warriors | 2.14 |
| Blocks per game | Marcus Camby | Denver Nuggets | 3.30 |
| Field goal percentage | Mikki Moore | New Jersey Nets | .608 |
| Free throw percentage | Kyle Korver | Philadelphia 76ers | .914 |
| Three-point field goal percentage | Jason Kapono | Miami Heat | .514 |

== Awards ==
=== Yearly awards ===
- Most Valuable Player: Dirk Nowitzki, Dallas Mavericks
- Defensive Player of the Year: Marcus Camby, Denver Nuggets
- Rookie of the Year: Brandon Roy, Portland Trail Blazers
- Sixth Man of the Year: Leandro Barbosa, Phoenix Suns
- Most Improved Player: Monta Ellis, Golden State Warriors
- Coach of the Year: Sam Mitchell, Toronto Raptors
- Executive of the Year: Bryan Colangelo, Toronto Raptors
- Sportsmanship Award: Luol Deng, Chicago Bulls

- All-NBA First Team:
  - F Dirk Nowitzki – Dallas Mavericks
  - F Tim Duncan – San Antonio Spurs
  - C Amar'e Stoudemire – Phoenix Suns
  - G Steve Nash – Phoenix Suns
  - G Kobe Bryant – Los Angeles Lakers
- NBA All-Defensive First Team:
  - F Tim Duncan – San Antonio Spurs
  - F Bruce Bowen – San Antonio Spurs
  - C Marcus Camby – Denver Nuggets
  - G Kobe Bryant – Los Angeles Lakers
  - G Raja Bell – Phoenix Suns
- NBA All-Rookie First Team:
  - Brandon Roy – Portland Trail Blazers
  - Andrea Bargnani – Toronto Raptors
  - Randy Foye – Minnesota Timberwolves
  - Rudy Gay – Memphis Grizzlies
  - Jorge Garbajosa – Toronto Raptors (tie)
  - LaMarcus Aldridge – Portland Trail Blazers (tie)
- All-NBA Second Team:
  - F LeBron James – Cleveland Cavaliers
  - F Chris Bosh – Toronto Raptors
  - C Yao Ming – Houston Rockets
  - G Gilbert Arenas – Washington Wizards
  - G Tracy McGrady – Houston Rockets
- NBA All-Defensive Second Team:
  - F Kevin Garnett – Minnesota Timberwolves
  - F Tayshaun Prince – Detroit Pistons
  - C Ben Wallace – Chicago Bulls
  - G Kirk Hinrich – Chicago Bulls
  - G Jason Kidd – New Jersey Nets
- All-NBA Rookie Second Team:
  - Paul Millsap – Utah Jazz
  - Adam Morrison – Charlotte Bobcats
  - Tyrus Thomas – Chicago Bulls
  - Craig Smith – Minnesota Timberwolves
  - Rajon Rondo – Boston Celtics (tie)
  - Walter Herrmann – Charlotte Bobcats (tie)
  - Marcus Williams – New Jersey Nets (tie)
- All-NBA Third Team:
  - F Kevin Garnett – Minnesota Timberwolves
  - F Carmelo Anthony – Denver Nuggets
  - C Dwight Howard – Orlando Magic
  - G Dwyane Wade – Miami Heat
  - G Chauncey Billups – Detroit Pistons

=== Players of the month ===
The following players were named the Eastern and Western Conference Players of the Month.

| Month | Eastern Conference | Western Conference | Ref. |
|---|---|---|---|
| October – November | Dwight Howard (Orlando Magic) (1/1) | Yao Ming (Houston Rockets) (1/1) | |
| December | Gilbert Arenas (Washington Wizards) (1/1) | Kobe Bryant (Los Angeles Lakers) (1/3) | |
| January | Chris Bosh (Toronto Raptors) (1/1) | Steve Nash (Phoenix Suns) (1/1) | |
| February | Chauncey Billups (Detroit Pistons) (1/1) | Dirk Nowitzki (Dallas Mavericks) (1/1) | |
| March | LeBron James (Cleveland Cavaliers) (1/1) | Kobe Bryant (Los Angeles Lakers) (2/3) | |
| April | Vince Carter (New Jersey Nets) (1/1) | Kobe Bryant (Los Angeles Lakers) (3/3) | |

=== Rookies of the month ===
The following players were named the Eastern and Western Conference Rookies of the Month.

| Month | Eastern Conference | Western Conference | Ref. |
|---|---|---|---|
| October – November | Adam Morrison (Charlotte Bobcats) (1/1) | Rudy Gay (Memphis Grizzlies) (1/1) | |
| December | Jorge Garbajosa (Toronto Raptors) (1/1) | Randy Foye (Minnesota Timberwolves) (1/1) | |
| January | Andrea Bargnani (Toronto Raptors) (1/2) | Brandon Roy (Portland Trail Blazers) (1/3) | |
| February | Andrea Bargnani (Toronto Raptors) (2/2) | Brandon Roy (Portland Trail Blazers) (2/3) | |
| March | Wálter Herrmann (Charlotte Bobcats) (1/1) | Brandon Roy (Portland Trail Blazers) (3/3) | |
| April | Shelden Williams (Atlanta Hawks) (1/1) | Tarence Kinsey (Memphis Grizzlies) (1/1) | |

== See also ==
- 2007 NBA All-Star Game
- 2007 NBA playoffs
- 2007 NBA Finals
- List of NBA regular season records
