= Michele Fitzgerald =

American TV personality (born 1990)

- Born: May 5, 1990 (age 36)
- Education: Montclair State University (BA)
- Occupations: Bartender; business development manager; podcaster; television personality; travel agent
- Television: Survivor: Kaôh Rōng (Winner); Survivor: Winners at War (2nd runner-up); The Challenge: Spies, Lies & Allies; The Challenge: Ride or Dies; The Challenge: USA 2 The Challenge: Battle for a New Champion; The Challenge 40: Battle of the Eras (3rd place); The Challenge: Cutthroat (2026 season) (Winner); The Traitors 6

Michele Fitzgerald (born May 5, 1990) is an American television personality and podcaster best known for competing on the reality competition shows Survivor and The Challenge. She was voted the winner of Survivor: Kaôh Rōng on May 18, 2016. Michele also competed on the show's 40th season, Survivor: Winners at War, where she was the 2nd runner-up. In 2026, she won The Challenge: Cutthroat, the shows forty-second season. She also reached the final on The Challenge 40: Battle of the Eras, in which she placed third.

== Early life ==
Fitzgerald grew up in Freehold Township, New Jersey. She attended Freehold High School, in Freehold Borough, then enrolled at Montclair State University, where she earned a Bachelor of Arts degree in communications studies. Her parents are Ralph and Linda Fitzgerald; she also has a sister named Kim, and a brother named Joe.

== Television appearances ==
=== Survivor : Kaôh Rōng ===
In 2015, Fitzgerald was selected as one of 18 castaways to compete on Survivor: Kaôh Rōng, the 32nd season of Survivor. Though Kaôh Rōng was the 32nd season to air, it was the 31st filmed, having been shot before Survivor: Cambodia, which aired first; the two seasons were filmed back-to-back in the same location. As the season’s theme was Brains vs. Brawn vs. Beauty, Fitzgerald was assigned to the Beauty tribe, Gondol, at the start of the game. On Day 12, the tribes were reshuffled, and Fitzgerald moved to the Chan Loh tribe alongside fellow Beauty member Nick Maiorano. After the tribes merged on Day 17, Fitzgerald and Maiorano found themselves in a swing position between the former Brains and Brawn alliances. Ultimately, they chose to align with the former Brawn members: Cydney Gillon, Kyle Jason, and Scot Pollard.

On Day 19, the first post-merge Tribal Council was canceled after Neal Gottlieb was medically evacuated from the game. Fitzgerald and Maiorano attended their first Tribal Council on Day 22, having previously avoided Tribal Council by consistently being on tribes that won immunity. At that vote, Fitzgerald joined the other women and Joe Del Campo in blindsiding Maiorano. At the following Tribal Council, Debbie Wanner was voted out by four of the remaining players, including Fitzgerald. On Day 27, Pollard was blindsided in a vote that Fitzgerald and Julia Sokolowski were not informed about beforehand. After Fitzgerald and Gillon won the subsequent reward challenge, they chose to bring Aubry Bracco with them in order to repair and strengthen their alliance.

At the Final Four Tribal Council, Fitzgerald attempted to vote out Bracco, who tied with Gillon. In the resulting fire-making tiebreaker, Bracco defeated Gillon to advance to the Final Three. The season’s final challenge was not for immunity, but instead for the power to remove a juror from the jury. Fitzgerald won the challenge against Bracco and Tai Trang, and later chose to remove Gottlieb from the jury. In his exit remarks, Gottlieb stated that he did not believe Fitzgerald would win the game.

At the Final Tribal Council, Fitzgerald was criticized for appearing strategically passive early in the game, but she was also praised for improving her gameplay and social positioning as the season progressed. In the end, Fitzgerald won the title of Sole Survivor in a 5–2–0 jury vote, receiving votes from Wanner, Pollard, Sokolowski, Jason, and Gillon. Bracco received two votes, while Trang received none.

With her victory, Fitzgerald became the first winner in Survivor history to be born in the 1990s.

=== Survivor: Winners at War ===
For winning Survivor: Kaôh Rōng, she returned to compete on Survivor: Winners at War. Starting on the Sele tribe, Fitzgerald attended Tribal Council three times but remained in a comfortable position within the tribe. She helped orchestrate the eliminations of fellow winners Danni Boatwright and Ethan Zohn. After the tribe reshuffle, Fitzgerald remained on Sele alongside fellow tribemate Parvati Shallow. Although they were outnumbered 3–2 by the original Dakal members and Shallow was voted out on Day 16, Fitzgerald survived the next two Tribal Councils and reached the merge.

Throughout most of the merge, Fitzgerald found herself on the wrong side of the vote. On Day 22, Shallow and Boatwright, who were living on the Edge of Extinction, sent Fitzgerald an advantage that allowed her to flip a coin for immediate immunity at any Tribal Council up until the Final Seven. On Day 29, she gave the advantage to her ally Jeremy Collins so he could protect himself at Tribal Council, but he ultimately chose not to use it and returned it to her afterward. Fitzgerald eventually played the advantage at the Final Seven, and the coin landed on "safe," granting her immunity for the vote.

On Day 34, Fitzgerald became a target of Tony Vlachos’ alliance, but she secured her safety by winning her first Individual Immunity Challenge of the season. Two days later, she came from behind to win her second immunity challenge. On Day 37, Fitzgerald received votes from Vlachos and Ben Driebergen, but survived the vote as Driebergen was eliminated instead. After Natalie Anderson won the Final Immunity Challenge, she chose to bring Fitzgerald to the Final Tribal Council.

By reaching the end, Fitzgerald became the only contestant in Survivor history to play multiple seasons, win at least once, and never be voted out. She also became only the second returning winner in the show’s history not to be voted out, after Jenna Morasca, who quit Survivor: All-Stars due to a family emergency. At the Final Tribal Council, Fitzgerald was praised for her ability to play from the bottom and maintain a strong social game, though much of the jury’s attention centered on Vlachos and Anderson. Fitzgerald ultimately received no votes to win, losing to Vlachos in a 12–4–0 jury vote. She became the only Survivor winner to play multiple seasons and never be voted out.

=== The Challenge ===
In 2021, Fitzgerald competed on the thirty-seventh season of The Challenge titled Spies, Lies & Allies. She was voted into the first elimination round alongside Corey Lay where they defeated opponents Michaela Bradshaw and Renan Hellemans. Fitzgerald and Lay were voted into elimination again in episode 4, and were eliminated after they lost against Amber Borzotra and Hughie Maughan.

In 2022, Fitzgerald returned for the show's thirty-eighth season titled Ride or Dies with Survivor: Millennials vs. Gen X alumnus Jay Starrett as her partner.

In 2023, Fitzgerald competed on the second season of The Challenge: USA, a spin-off of The Challenge. The same year, she competed on thirty-ninth season of the main series, Battle for a New Champion.

In 2024, Fitzgerald competed on the fortieth season, Battle of the Eras.

In 2026, Fitzgerald returned to The Challenge for the forty-second season, The Challenge: Cutthroat where she won her first title.

=== The Traitors ===
On September 18, 2026, Fitzgerald was announced as a cast member for the upcoming sixth season of The Traitors.

== Podcasting ==
In 2025, Fitzgerald started hosting the The Social Game on Rob Has a Podcast along with Survivor 45 alumni Kellie Nalbandian. The podcast discussed reality television competition shows and invited guests to discuss their social lives post filming. Fitzgerald has also appeared on several podcast episodes on MTV's Official Challenge Podcast.

== Other activities outside television ==
Fitzgerald had been working as a bartender at the time she started on Survivor. Before that, she also worked as a caterer, and as an intern with Rock the Earth, an organization that goes to various music events to raise awareness of environmental issues. At the time she was crowned Sole Survivor, she was working as a travel agent.

== Personal life ==
In 2018, Fitzgerald began dating fellow Survivor winner Wendell Holland. By 2020, the couple had separated. However, the pair continued to be friends. In 2020, Fitzgerald began dating another Survivor alum and Survivor: Island of the Idols finalist Dean Kowalski. The couple broke up after a few months of dating. Since 2024, Fitzgearld has been dating The Challenge contestant Devin Walker.

== Filmography ==
Key
†	Denotes television productions that have not yet been released

Year	Title	Role	Notes
2016	Survivor: Kaôh Rōng	Contestant	Winner
2020	Survivor: Winners at War	Contestant	2nd Runner-Up
2021	The Challenge: Spies, Lies & Allies	Contestant	26th place
2022–2023	The Challenge: Ride or Dies	Contestant with Jay Starrett	10th place
2023	The Challenge: USA (season 2)	Contestant	11th place
2023–2024	The Challenge: Battle for a New Champion	Contestant	10th place
2024–2025	The Challenge 40: Battle of the Eras	Contestant	3rd place
2026	Vanderpump Villa	Guest	
2026	The Challenge: Cutthroat	Contestant	Winner
2027	The Traitors †	Contestant, season 6	TBA

Preceded by Jeremy Collins	Winner of Survivor; Survivor: Kaôh Rōng	Succeeded by Adam Klein
