= Survivor: Brains vs. Brawn vs. Beauty =

Survivor: Brains vs. Brawn vs. Beauty may refer to:

- Survivor: Cagayan, the twenty-eighth season of American version of Survivor, also known as Survivor: Cagayan — Brains vs. Brawn vs. Beauty
- Survivor: Kaôh Rōng, the thirty-second season of American version of Survivor, also known as Survivor: Kaôh Rōng — Brains vs. Brawn vs. Beauty
