= 2007 NBA Finals =

2007 basketball championship series

Team	Coach	Wins
San Antonio Spurs	Gregg Popovich	4
Cleveland Cavaliers	Mike Brown	0
- Dates: June 7–14
- MVP: Tony Parker (San Antonio Spurs)
- Hall of Famers: Spurs: Tim Duncan (2020); Manu Ginóbili (2022); Tony Parker (2023); Coaches: Gregg Popovich (2023); Officials: Dick Bavetta (2015); Danny Crawford (2025)
- Eastern finals: Cavaliers defeated Pistons, 4–2
- Western finals: Spurs defeated Jazz, 4–1

The 2007 NBA Finals was the championship series of the National Basketball Association's (NBA) 2006–07 season and conclusion of the season's playoffs. In this best-of-seven playoff series, the Western Conference champion San Antonio Spurs defeated the Eastern Conference champion Cleveland Cavaliers in a 4–0 sweep. This was Cleveland's first trip to the NBA Finals in their franchise history (as well as the first for LeBron James) and San Antonio's fourth. Tony Parker was named the series' MVP. The series was televised on ABC under the ESPN on ABC branding, and produced the lowest television ratings in NBA Finals history until 2020.

This series was the last sweep in the NBA Finals until 2018, which also involved the Cavaliers on the losing end.

== Format ==
The Finals were played using the 2-3-2 format, where the first two and last two games are held at the team with home court advantage. The NBA, after experimenting in the early years, restored this original format for the Finals in 1985. The other playoff series were played in the 2-2-1-1-1 format.

The best-of-seven series began on June 7, 2007, with the Western Conference champion San Antonio Spurs playing the Eastern Conference champion Cleveland Cavaliers. Because the San Antonio Spurs had a better regular season win–loss record, they had home court advantage.

== Background ==
=== 2007 NBA playoffs ===
San Antonio Spurs (Western Conference champion)		Cleveland Cavaliers (Eastern Conference champion)
# / Western Conference; # / Team / W / L / PCT / GB; 1 / z-Dallas Mavericks / 67 / 15 / .817 / -; 2 / y-Phoenix Suns / 61 / 21 / .744 / 6; 3 / x-San Antonio Spurs / 58 / 24 / .707 / 9; 4 / y-Utah Jazz / 51 / 31 / .622 / 16; 5 / x-Houston Rockets / 52 / 30 / .634 / 15; 6 / x-Denver Nuggets / 45 / 37 / .549 / 22; 7 / x-Los Angeles Lakers / 42 / 40 / .512 / 25; 8 / x-Golden State Warriors / 42 / 40 / .512 / 25; 9 / Los Angeles Clippers / 40 / 42 / .488 / 27; 10 / New Orleans/Oklahoma City Hornets / 39 / 43 / .476 / 28; 11 / Sacramento Kings / 33 / 49 / .402 / 34; 12 / Portland Trail Blazers / 32 / 50 / .390 / 35; 13 / Minnesota Timberwolves / 32 / 50 / .390 / 35; 14 / Seattle SuperSonics / 31 / 51 / .378 / 36; 15 / Memphis Grizzlies / 22 / 60 / .268 / 45; 3rd seed in the West, 3rd best league record	Regular season	# / Eastern Conference; # / Team / W / L / PCT / GB; 1 / c-Detroit Pistons / 53 / 29 / .646 / –; 2 / x-Cleveland Cavaliers / 50 / 32 / .610 / 3; 3 / y-Toronto Raptors / 47 / 35 / .573 / 6; 4 / y-Miami Heat / 44 / 38 / .537 / 9; 5 / x-Chicago Bulls / 49 / 33 / .598 / 4; 6 / x-New Jersey Nets / 41 / 41 / .500 / 12; 7 / x-Washington Wizards / 41 / 41 / .500 / 12; 8 / x-Orlando Magic / 40 / 42 / .488 / 13; 9 / Philadelphia 76ers / 35 / 47 / .427 / 18; 10 / Indiana Pacers / 35 / 47 / .427 / 18; 11 / New York Knicks / 33 / 49 / .402 / 20; 12 / Charlotte Bobcats / 33 / 49 / .402 / 20; 13 / Atlanta Hawks / 30 / 52 / .366 / 23; 14 / Milwaukee Bucks / 28 / 54 / .341 / 25; 15 / Boston Celtics / 24 / 58 / .293 / 29; 2nd seed in the East, 7th best league record
Defeated the (6) Denver Nuggets, 4–1	First round	Defeated the (7) Washington Wizards, 4–0
Defeated the (2) Phoenix Suns, 4–2	Conference semifinals	Defeated the (6) New Jersey Nets, 4–2
Defeated the (4) Utah Jazz, 4–1	Conference finals	Defeated the (1) Detroit Pistons, 4–2

=== Regular season series ===
The Cleveland Cavaliers won both games in the regular season series:

ESPN

November 3

Cleveland Cavaliers 88, San Antonio Spurs 81

AT&T Center, San Antonio

NBA TV

January 2

San Antonio Spurs 78, Cleveland Cavaliers 92

Quicken Loans Arena, Cleveland

=== San Antonio Spurs ===
The previous season saw the San Antonio Spurs drop a heartbreaking seventh game at home to the rival Dallas Mavericks in the second round. As the new season began, the Spurs saw the Mavericks rolling through their regular season, on their way to a franchise best 67 win campaign. Meanwhile, the Spurs struggled through their season through January. With the main focus lying on Dallas and the Phoenix Suns, the Spurs found themselves flying under the radar. A late-season surge resulted in a 58–24 regular season record, good enough for third seed in the Western Conference.

In the playoffs, the Spurs met the Denver Nuggets and their duo of Allen Iverson and Carmelo Anthony. The Nuggets took game 1, but the Spurs reeled off 4 straight wins to take the series in five games. As San Antonio prepared to face off against the second seed Suns, the top-ranked Mavericks suffered a stunning first-round exit at the hands of the Golden State Warriors. With the Mavericks gone, the stakes of the Suns-Spurs series shot up dramatically, and it was a closely competitive and controversial series.

The Suns had homecourt advantage, but that did not last past game 1. In a hotly contested battle of Western Conference heavyweights, each team tried to deliver a knockout blow. The Spurs finally landed it, but by accident. With the game in the balance Tony Parker and Steve Nash collided head-to-head. A large gash opened along Nash's nose and the medical staff could not stop the bleeding. He was forced to sit out the final 45 seconds and watch the Spurs win, 111–106. Game 2 saw the Suns rebound and blow out the Spurs, 101–81. After this game, Suns center Amar'e Stoudemire called the Spurs a dirty team. Game 3 switched back to San Antonio and saw a return of physical play, with Manu Ginóbili receiving a bruised and bloodied eye and Bruce Bowen kneeing Nash in the groin. Tim Duncan led the Spurs to a 108–101 victory.

Games 4 and 5 were the most controversial of the series. The Spurs, after being comfortably in control of game 4, saw their 11-point fourth-quarter lead dwindle away to a 2-point Suns lead. With 18 seconds left, Robert Horry bodychecked Nash into the scorers' table. Nash's teammates jumped to his defense; during the ensuing altercation, Stoudemire and Boris Diaw left the bench. Their action violated NBA rules, and league commissioner David Stern suspended both players for game 5. Horry was also suspended two games for his flagrant foul on Nash. In game 5, in Phoenix, the short-handed Suns jumped out early to a 16-point lead, but in a reversal of game 4, the Spurs came back in the final seconds and won the game 88–85, giving San Antonio a 3–2 series lead.

The Spurs won game 6 of the series 114–106 in San Antonio, sending them to their fifth Western Conference finals since 1999.

San Antonio went on to beat the Utah Jazz in five games to advance to the franchise's fourth NBA Finals.

=== Cleveland Cavaliers ===
In the replay of the previous year's playoffs with the Cavaliers holding home court advantage against Washington Wizards, the Cavaliers swept the Wizards after the season-ending injuries of both Gilbert Arenas and Caron Butler. In the second round of the playoffs, the Cavaliers faced the New Jersey Nets. Again, the Cavaliers had home court advantage, and battled the Nets through 6 games before winning the series. The Cavaliers advanced to the conference finals for only the third time in franchise history, and faced a familiar foe: the Detroit Pistons, the number one seed in the Eastern Conference, with their home court advantage. This was the same Detroit team that knocked the Cavaliers out of the second round the previous year. Expectations were high after a 7-game series the previous year and the two teams did not disappoint.

The first two games were close and saw Cleveland fall by identical 79–76 scores. Down 0–2 in the series, the spotlight shifted back to Cleveland and LeBron James. Another hard-fought set ensued, with the Cavaliers taking the two games at home 88-82 and 91-87 respectively. Game 5 switched back to Detroit and produced one of the greatest moments in NBA history.

With 6:14 to go in regulation and his team clinging to a one-point 79–78 lead, James took over the game. He scored 11 of the final 12 points to end regulation tied 91-91. In the first overtime, James scored all nine of the Cavaliers' points, ending the period tied 100-100. In the second overtime, James again scored all nine of the team's points to win, 109–107. Thus, in the last 16:14 of play, James scored 29 of the Cavaliers' last 30 points, as well as all of their last 25 points.

The Cavaliers beat the Pistons at home in Game 6 of the Eastern Conference finals to earn the franchise's first trip to the NBA Finals. Cleveland became the third team in NBA history to win a best-of-seven conference finals series after trailing by 2 games.

== Rosters ==
=== San Antonio Spurs ===
2006–07 San Antonio Spurs roster
Players

Pos.	No.	Player	Height	Weight	DOB	From
G/F	17	Brent Barry	6 ft 7 in (2.01 m)	209 lb (95 kg)	1971–12–31	Oregon State
F	15	Matt Bonner	6 ft 10 in (2.08 m)	235 lb (107 kg)	1980–04–05	Florida
G/F	12	Bruce Bowen	6 ft 7 in (2.01 m)	200 lb (91 kg)	1971–06–14	Cal State Fullerton
F/C	45	Jackie Butler	6 ft 10 in (2.08 m)	260 lb (118 kg)	1985–03–10	Coastal Christian Academy
F/C	21	Tim Duncan	6 ft 11 in (2.11 m)	250 lb (113 kg)	1976–04–25	Wake Forest
C	16	Francisco Elson	7 ft 0 in (2.13 m)	235 lb (107 kg)	1976–02–28	California
F	2	Melvin Ely	6 ft 10 in (2.08 m)	261 lb (118 kg)	1978–05–02	Fresno State
G/F	4	Michael Finley	6 ft 7 in (2.01 m)	225 lb (102 kg)	1973–03–06	Wisconsin
G	20	Manu Ginóbili	6 ft 6 in (1.98 m)	205 lb (93 kg)	1977–07–28	Argentina
F	5	Robert Horry	6 ft 9 in (2.06 m)	240 lb (109 kg)	1970–08–25	Alabama
F/C	7	Fabricio Oberto	6 ft 10 in (2.08 m)	256 lb (116 kg)	1975–03–21	Argentina
G	9	Tony Parker	6 ft 2 in (1.88 m)	185 lb (84 kg)	1982–05–17	France
G	14	Beno Udrih	6 ft 3 in (1.91 m)	205 lb (93 kg)	1982–07–05	Slovenia
G	11	Jacque Vaughn	6 ft 1 in (1.85 m)	190 lb (86 kg)	1975–02–11	Kansas
G/F	33	James White	6 ft 7 in (2.01 m)	215 lb (98 kg)	1982–10–21	Cincinnati

Coaches
Head coach
- Gregg Popovich
Assistant(s)
- Brett Brown
- Mike Budenholzer
- P. J. Carlesimo

Legend
- (DP) Unsigned draft pick
- (FA) Free agent
- (S) Suspended
- Injured

Roster
Updated: February 13, 2007

=== Cleveland Cavaliers ===
2006–07 Cleveland Cavaliers roster
Players

Pos.	No.	Player	Height	Weight	DOB	From
G	6	Shannon Brown	6 ft 4 in (1.93 m)	210 lb (95 kg)	1985–11–30	Michigan State
G	1	Daniel Gibson	6 ft 2 in (1.88 m)	200 lb (91 kg)	1986–02–27	Texas
F	90	Drew Gooden	6 ft 10 in (2.08 m)	250 lb (113 kg)	1981–09–24	Kansas
G	32	Larry Hughes	6 ft 5 in (1.96 m)	184 lb (83 kg)	1979–01–23	Saint Louis
C	11	Žydrūnas Ilgauskas	7 ft 3 in (2.21 m)	260 lb (118 kg)	1975–06–05	Lithuania
F	23	LeBron James	6 ft 9 in (2.06 m)	250 lb (113 kg)	1984–12–30	St. Vincent–St. Mary HS (OH)
G	19	Damon Jones	6 ft 4 in (1.93 m)	200 lb (91 kg)	1976–08–25	Houston
F/C	27	Dwayne Jones	6 ft 11 in (2.11 m)	250 lb (113 kg)	1983–06–09	Saint Joseph's
F	24	Donyell Marshall	6 ft 9 in (2.06 m)	245 lb (111 kg)	1973–05–18	Connecticut
F	14	Ira Newble	6 ft 7 in (2.01 m)	235 lb (107 kg)	1975–01–20	Miami (OH)
G/F	3	Aleksandar Pavlović	6 ft 7 in (2.01 m)	235 lb (107 kg)	1983–11–15	Serbia
F/C	31	Scot Pollard	6 ft 11 in (2.11 m)	278 lb (126 kg)	1975–02–12	Kansas
G	20	Eric Snow	6 ft 3 in (1.91 m)	190 lb (86 kg)	1973–04–24	Michigan State
F/C	17	Anderson Varejão	6 ft 11 in (2.11 m)	273 lb (124 kg)	1982–09–28	Brazil
G	4	David Wesley	6 ft 1 in (1.85 m)	229 lb (104 kg)	1970–11–14	Baylor

Coaches
Head coach
- Mike Brown
Assistant(s)
- Hank Egan
- Melvin Hunt
- Michael Malone
- Kenny Natt

Legend
- (DP) Unsigned draft pick
- (FA) Free agent
- (S) Suspended
- Injured

Roster
Updated: March 26, 2007

== Player statistics ==
Legend
GP	Games played	GS	Games started	MPG	Minutes per game
FG%	Field-goal percentage	3P%	3-point field-goal percentage	FT%	Free-throw percentage
RPG	Rebounds per game	APG	Assists per game	SPG	Steals per game
BPG	Blocks per game	PPG	Points per game

San Antonio Spurs

San Antonio Spurs statistics
Player	GP	GS	MPG	FG%	3P%	FT%	RPG	APG	SPG	BPG	PPG
Brent Barry	4	0	10.6	.364	.400	.000	1.5	0.5	0.3	0.0	3.0
Bruce Bowen	4	4	41.7	.296	.389	.250	5.5	1.3	0.5	0.3	6.0
Tim Duncan	4	4	37.3	.446	.000	.625	11.5	3.8	1.3	2.3	18.3
Francisco Elson	4	0	11.4	1.000	.000	.800	2.5	0.0	0.3	0.0	4.0
Michael Finley	4	4	18.5	.261	.083	.667	2.0	0.8	1.3	0.0	3.8
Manu Ginóbili	4	0	29.3	.367	.435	.833	5.8	2.5	1.3	0.0	17.8
Robert Horry	4	0	22.0	.333	.375	.750	4.5	3.3	0.3	1.3	3.0
Fabricio Oberto	4	4	20.8	.471	.000	.333	4.3	0.5	0.3	0.0	4.3
Tony Parker	4	4	37.8	.568	.571	.526	5.0	3.3	0.8	0.0	24.5
Beno Udrih	2	0	0.6	.000	.000	.000	0.0	0.0	0.0	0.0	0.0
Jacque Vaughn	4	0	10.1	.571	.000	.000	1.3	1.0	0.0	0.0	2.0

Cleveland Cavaliers

Cleveland Cavaliers statistics
Player	GP	GS	MPG	FG%	3P%	FT%	RPG	APG	SPG	BPG	PPG
Shannon Brown	1	0	0.0	.000	.000	.000	0.0	0.0	0.0	0.0	0.0
Daniel Gibson	4	2	34.8	.439	.316	1.000	1.8	2.5	1.5	0.0	10.8
Drew Gooden	4	4	27.5	.500	.000	.875	8.3	0.3	0.3	0.5	12.8
Larry Hughes	2	2	21.9	.100	.000	.000	2.5	1.0	0.5	0.0	1.0
Zydrunas Ilgauskas	4	4	25.8	.351	.000	.833	10.3	0.5	0.5	1.0	7.8
LeBron James	4	4	42.6	.356	.200	.690	7.0	6.8	1.0	0.5	22.0
Damon Jones	4	0	16.2	.455	.556	1.000	1.3	1.0	0.0	0.0	4.5
Donyell Marshall	4	0	15.3	.313	.182	.750	2.3	1.3	0.8	0.0	3.8
Ira Newble	1	0	10.	.000	.000	.000	1.0	0.0	0.0	0.0	0.0
Aleksandar Pavlović	4	4	31.7	.364	.417	.333	2.5	0.8	0.5	0.0	9.8
Scot Pollard	1	0	0.9	.000	.000	.000	0.0	0.0	0.0	0.0	0.0
Eric Snow	4	0	10.2	.400	.000	.500	1.0	2.3	0.3	0.3	1.3
Anderson Varejão	4	0	24.5	.667	.000	.625	5.3	0.8	1.3	0.5	7.5

== Series summary ==
Game	Date	Road team	Result	Home team
Game 1	June 7	Cleveland Cavaliers	76–85 (0–1)	San Antonio Spurs
Game 2	June 10	Cleveland Cavaliers	92–103 (0–2)	San Antonio Spurs
Game 3	June 12	San Antonio Spurs	75–72 (3–0)	Cleveland Cavaliers
Game 4	June 14	San Antonio Spurs	83–82 (4–0)	Cleveland Cavaliers

== Game summaries ==
All times are in Eastern Daylight Time (UTC−4). If the venue is located in a different time zone, the local time is also given.

=== Game 1 ===
The Cleveland Cavaliers entered the 2007 Finals as newcomers. Game 1 was their first NBA Finals game in franchise history, and the first for each of its players (other than reserve point guard Eric Snow). However, the San Antonio Spurs had been to the Finals in three of the past eight seasons, winning a championship each time. With solid performances by Tim Duncan, Tony Parker, and Manu Ginóbili, the Spurs won the series opener in convincing fashion, limiting LeBron James to 14 points on 4–16 shooting.

ABC, ABCHD, TSN, Canal 7, Canal+, ESPN Brasil

June 7
9:00 p.m. (8:00 p.m. CDT)

Recap
Video highlights on YouTube

Cleveland Cavaliers 76, San Antonio Spurs 85
Scoring by quarter: 15–20, 20–20, 14–24, 27–21
Pts: Daniel Gibson 16; Rebs: LeBron James 7 Asts: James, Gibson 4 each TOs: LeBron James 6	Pts: Tony Parker 27; Rebs: Tim Duncan 13; Asts: Tony Parker 7 Blocks: Tim Duncan 5
San Antonio leads series, 1-0

AT&T Center, San Antonio, Texas
Attendance: 18,797
Referees:
- No. 41 Ken Mauer
- No. 14 Mike Callahan
- No. 29 Steve Javie

=== Game 2 ===
The Spurs took a stranglehold on momentum in Game 2. The Spurs' big three overwhelmed the Cavs and the Spurs led by as many as 29 points in the third quarter. They dominated the game during the first 3 quarters and played show-time basketball. A furious 25–6 rally by Cleveland in the final quarter wasn't enough as the Spurs took a 2–0 lead in the series.

ABC, ABCHD, TSN, Canal 7, Canal+, ESPN Brasil

June 10
9:00 p.m. (8:00 p.m. CDT)

Recap
Video highlights on YouTube

Cleveland Cavaliers 92, San Antonio Spurs 103
Scoring by quarter: 17–28, 16–30, 29–31, 30–14
Pts: LeBron James 25; Rebs: Anderson Varejão 10; Asts: LeBron James 6 TOs: LeBron James 6	Pts: Tony Parker 30; Rebs: Duncan, Horry 9 each Asts: Tim Duncan 8 Blks: Robert Horry 5
San Antonio leads series, 2-0

AT&T Center, San Antonio, Texas
Attendance: 18,797
Referees:
- No. 27 Dick Bavetta
- No. 6 Jim Clark
- No. 14 Joe DeRosa

=== Game 3 ===
Rookie Daniel Gibson started Game 3 in place of the injured Larry Hughes but scored a series-low 2 points on 1-10 shooting. As a team the Cavs shot only .367, but out-rebounded the Spurs 48–41. Zydrunas Ilgauskas had a 2006–07 season high 18 rebounds. On the game's final play, LeBron James missed a potential game-tying 29 foot 3-pointer.

Game 3 was the lowest scoring Finals game since 1955, with Tim Duncan of the Spurs having his lowest scoring game in his NBA Finals career, with 14 points.

ABC, ABCHD, TSN, Canal 7, Canal+, ESPN Brasil

June 12
9:00 p.m.

Recap
Video highlights on YouTube

San Antonio Spurs 75, Cleveland Cavaliers 72
Scoring by quarter: 16–18, 24–20, 15–12, 20–22
Pts: Tony Parker 17; Rebs: Duncan, Bowen 9 each Asts: Manu Ginóbili 5 Stls: Michael Finley 4	Pts: LeBron James 25; Rebs: Žydrūnas Ilgauskas 18; Asts: LeBron James 7 TOs: LeBron James 5
San Antonio leads series, 3-0

Quicken Loans Arena, Cleveland, Ohio
Attendance: 20,562
Referees:
- No. 7 Bernie Fryer
- No. 26 Bob Delaney
- No. 43 Dan Crawford

=== Game 4 ===
San Antonio started out strong through the first three quarters, leading by as many as 11. Cleveland would stage a rally near the end of the third quarter and the first five minutes of the fourth, scoring 14 consecutive points to take its first second-half lead of the series. However, the Spurs would stage a 12–3 rally of their own to retake the lead and win the series in a 4–0 sweep.

ABC, ABCHD, TSN, Canal 7, Canal+, ESPN Brasil

June 14
9:00 p.m.

Recap
Video highlights on YouTube

San Antonio Spurs 83, Cleveland Cavaliers 82
Scoring by quarter: 19–20, 20–14, 21–18, 23–30
Pts: Manu Ginóbili 27; Rebs: Tim Duncan 15; Asts: Manu Ginóbili 5 TOs: Tim Duncan 6	Pts: LeBron James 24; Rebs: Žydrūnas Ilgauskas 13; Asts: LeBron James 10; TOs: LeBron James 6
San Antonio wins NBA Finals, 4-0

Quicken Loans Arena, Cleveland, Ohio
Attendance: 20,562
Referees:
- No. 15 Bennett Salvatore
- No. 45 Joe Forte
- No. 32 Eddie F. Rush

Twelve-year veteran Michael Finley was awarded the NBA championship game ball.

== Broadcasting ==
Coverage was produced by ESPN and televised on ABC in the United States, TSN in Canada, Sky Sports in the United Kingdom, Canal+ in France, Premiere in Germany, and more than 100 other broadcasters in over 200 countries. The local ABC stations in each city were KSAT-TV in San Antonio and WEWS-TV in Cleveland; this was the smallest TV market-sized finals until the 2025 NBA Finals between the Oklahoma City Thunder and Indiana Pacers.

Play-by-play announcer Mike Breen, analysts Mark Jackson and former Rockets head-coach Jeff Van Gundy, and courtside reporters Michele Tafoya and Stuart Scott provided commentary and analysis for the North American market. The radio coverage on ESPN Radio features play-by-play man Mike Tirico and color analysts Dr. Jack Ramsay and Hubie Brown.

This was the first of a record 15 NBA Finals assignments for the team of Breen, Jackson and Van Gundy. With the exception of the 2012 and 2013 Finals (Jackson was head coach of the Golden State Warriors during this period), the trio would call every NBA Finals until 2023, including every one of LeBron James' NBA Finals appearances with the Cleveland Cavaliers. (In the 2022 NBA Finals, Mark Jones alongside Mark Jackson called Game 1 of the series with Breen and Van Gundy out due to COVID-19 protocols; Van Gundy returned in Game 2 followed by Breen in Game 3.)

The featured song, aired throughout the playoffs, was The Pussycat Dolls "Right Now."

Another song featured in the 2007 NBA Finals series, "It Ends Tonight" by The All-American Rejects, was aired at the end of the pre-game promo for Game 4.

The 2007 NBA Finals was the first to feature the ESPN on ABC branding, which replaced ABC Sports in September 2006.

=== Ratings ===
According to ESPN, the NBA Finals series was a television bust in the United States. San Antonio's four-game sweep of Cleveland finished with a record-low 6.2 television rating and 11 share on ABC, Nielsen Media Research said on June 15, 2007.

That was down 27 percent from the 8.5/15 for Miami's six-game victory over Dallas from the previous year and 5 percent under the previous low, a 6.5/12 for San Antonio's six-game win over New Jersey in 2003.

San Antonio's series-winning 83–82 victory on Thursday night got a 6.5/12, down 17 percent from the 7.8/14 for Game 4 in 2006.

Despite having the lowest ratings of any NBA championship series, game two of the 2003 series between San Antonio and New Jersey remains the lowest-rated game of all time in the history of the NBA Finals.

== Aftermath ==
When discussing the 2007 NBA Finals years later, Robert Horry would call it the easiest of his seven championships. He noted that due to Mike Brown working under Gregg Popovich, Brown ran many of the similar plays the Spurs did. "We just needed to double LeBron and they had no one and a rookie coach who couldn't make adjustments... they were running the same out-of-timeout plays we ran all year", he said in 2023.

The Spurs won 56 games in the succeeding 2007–08 season, but relinquished the Southwest Division title to the New Orleans Hornets due to a tie-breaker. The Spurs later defeated the Hornets in seven games in the Western Conference semifinals. But their chance of defending their title was denied by the Los Angeles Lakers in five games of the conference finals. After that, age and injury took its toll on the Spurs, as they proceeded to win only a single playoff series in three years (2010, vs. Dallas 4–2 of the first round), before getting upset by the Memphis Grizzlies in the first round of the 2011 NBA playoffs despite finishing with 61 wins.

The Spurs then retooled their roster, after which they appeared in three consecutive conference finals, beginning in 2012, before making the NBA Finals in 2013 and 2014 against James and the Miami Heat. The Spurs split the two Finals meetings against the Heat.

The Cavaliers won 45 games in the 2007–08 season, despite early-season contract issues involving center Anderson Varejão and guard Sasha Pavlović, and a mid-season trade for Ben Wallace. They fell in the second round to the eventual NBA champions Boston Celtics in seven games, after a hard-fought duel involving LeBron James and Paul Pierce. The Cavaliers would earn the league's best record for the next two years (66 and 61 wins, respectively) and boast the NBA's MVP in James. However, they were unable to win it all, losing to the Orlando Magic in six games of the 2009 Eastern Conference finals and the Celtics in six games of the 2010 Eastern Conference semifinals (allowing the Lakers to win the Finals twice against the Magic and Celtics). The latter playoff defeat would cost head coach Mike Brown his job, though he was later re-hired (and fired again) in the 2013–14 NBA season. After that season, as a free agent, James left for the Miami Heat and helped them to four successive NBA Finals appearances, winning in 2012 and 2013, while the Cavaliers sunk to an Eastern Conference-low 19 wins in the 2010–11 NBA season, which included a 26-game losing streak.

The Cavaliers then appeared in the NBA draft lottery four consecutive times, earning the top pick in three of them. Those three top picks became Kyrie Irving (2011), Anthony Bennett (2013) and Andrew Wiggins (2014) (Bennett and Wiggins were later traded to Minnesota for Kevin Love). In July 2014, James announced his return to the Cavaliers after the hiring of coach David Blatt (he was later fired and replaced by Tyronn Lue in-season), and they reached the conference finals against the Atlanta Hawks with a 4–0 sweep before falling to the Golden State Warriors in the Finals 4–2. The following season, the Cavaliers returned to the Finals in a rematch against the Golden State Warriors and won the Finals over the Warriors 4–3 with LeBron James winning the Finals MVP. This was the city of Cleveland's first sports title 1964.
