= 2006–07 Cleveland Cavaliers season =

NBA professional basketball team season

- Conference champions
- Head coach: Mike Brown
- General manager: Danny Ferry
- Owner: Dan Gilbert
- Arena: Quicken Loans Arena

Results
- Record: 50–32 (.610)
- Place: Division: 2nd (Central); Conference: 2nd (Eastern)
- Playoff finish: NBA Finals (lost to Spurs 0–4)
- Stats at Basketball Reference

Local media
- Television: Fox Sports Ohio; WUAB
- Radio: WTAM

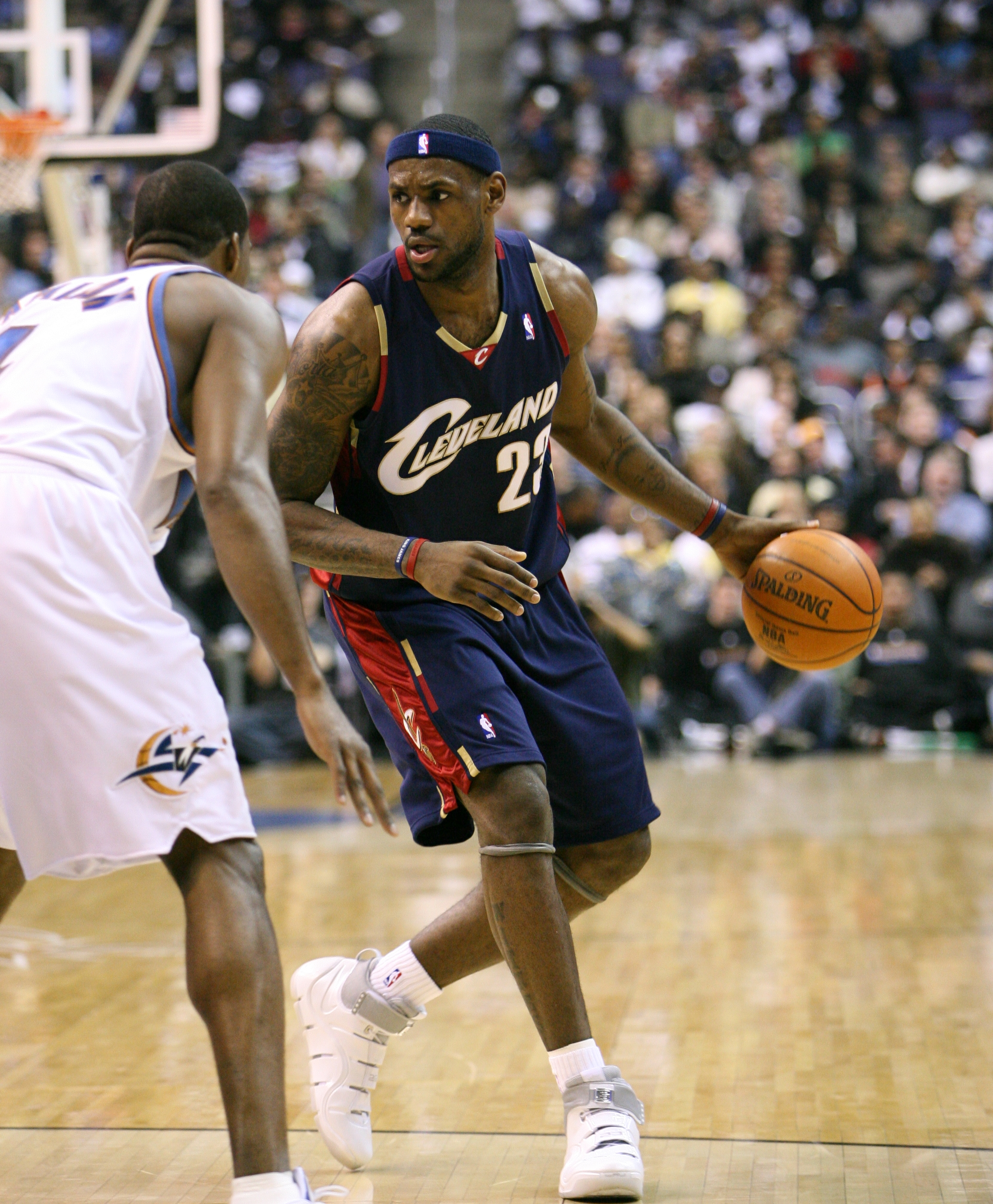
LeBron James led the Cavaliers to their first Eastern Conference championship.

The 2006–07 Cleveland Cavaliers season was the 37th season of the franchise in the National Basketball Association (NBA). Led by 22-year old forward LeBron James, the Cavaliers finished the season with a 50–32 record, finishing second-place in the Central Division, winning their first Eastern Conference championship, and earning the franchise's first trip to the NBA Finals. During the season, the Cavaliers were recorded as having the fourth best team defensive rating in the NBA.

The Cavaliers clinched their playoff berth for the second consecutive season since the 2005–06 season and their second time since the 1997–98 season. In the playoffs, the Cavaliers swept the Washington Wizards in four games in the First Round, then defeated the New Jersey Nets in six games in the Semi-finals, before finally defeating the top-seeded Detroit Pistons in six games in the conference finals, advancing to their first ever NBA Finals.

However, in the NBA Finals, the Cavaliers were defeated by the more experienced San Antonio Spurs in four games. James was the team's leading scorer and finished in 5th place in league MVP voting.

The Cavaliers would not return to the Finals until 2015, when James returned to the team after a four year tenure with the Miami Heat.

== Key Dates ==
- On June 28, the 2006 NBA draft took place in New York City.
- In July, the free agency period began.
- On October 10, the Cavaliers' preseason began with a 93–109 loss to the Boston Celtics.
- On November 1, the Cavaliers' regular season began with a 97–94 win over the Washington Wizards.
- On March 27, the Cavaliers clinched a playoff berth.
- On June 2, the Cavaliers won their first ever Eastern Conference championship.
- On June 14, the Cavaliers' season ended in an NBA Finals sweep to the San Antonio Spurs.

== Offseason ==
=== Free agents ===
Additions
Player	Date	Former team
Scot Pollard	August 18	Indiana Pacers
David Wesley	September 5	Houston Rockets

Subtractions
Player	Date	New team
Flip Murray	July 18	Detroit Pistons
Stephen Graham	August 9	Portland Trail Blazers
Alan Henderson	September 8	Philadelphia 76ers
Eddie Basden	November	Fenerbahçe

=== Trades ===
August 18, 2006	To Cleveland Cavaliers Eddie Basden	To Chicago Bulls Martynas Andriuskevicius

October 13, 2006	To Cleveland Cavaliers Dwayne Jones	To Boston Celtics Luke Jackson and cash considerations

== Draft picks ==
Round	Pick	Player	Position	Nationality	School/Club team
1	25	Shannon Brown	Guard	United States	Michigan State
2	42^{*}	Daniel Gibson	Guard	United States	Texas
2	55	Ejike Ugboaja	Forward	Nigeria	Union Bank Lagos (Nigeria)

^{*}2nd round pick acquired from Philadelphia in Lee Nailon deal.

== Roster ==
2006–07 Cleveland Cavaliers roster
Players

Pos.	No.	Player	Height	Weight	DOB	From
G	6	Shannon Brown	6 ft 4 in (1.93 m)	205 lb (93 kg)	1985-11-29	Michigan State
G	1	Daniel Gibson	6 ft 2 in (1.88 m)	190 lb (86 kg)	1986-02-27	Texas
F	90	Drew Gooden	6 ft 10 in (2.08 m)	250 lb (113 kg)	1981-09-24	Kansas
G	32	Larry Hughes	6 ft 5 in (1.96 m)	214 lb (97 kg)	1979-01-23	Saint Louis
C	11	Zydrunas Ilgauskas	7 ft 3 in (2.21 m)	260 lb (118 kg)	1975-06-05	Lithuania
F	23	LeBron James	6 ft 9 in (2.06 m)	240 lb (109 kg)	1984-12-30	St. Vincent–St. Mary HS (OH)
G	19	Damon Jones	6 ft 3 in (1.91 m)	190 lb (86 kg)	1976-08-25	Houston
F	27	Dwayne Jones	6 ft 11 in (2.11 m)	251 lb (114 kg)	1983-06-09	Saint Joseph's
F	24	Donyell Marshall	6 ft 9 in (2.06 m)	230 lb (104 kg)	1973-05-18	Connecticut
F	14	Ira Newble	6 ft 7 in (2.01 m)	220 lb (100 kg)	1975-01-20	Miami (OH)
G	3	Aleksandar Pavlović	6 ft 7 in (2.01 m)	210 lb (95 kg)	1983-11-15	Serbia
C	31	Scot Pollard	6 ft 11 in (2.11 m)	265 lb (120 kg)	1975-02-12	Kansas
G	20	Eric Snow	6 ft 3 in (1.91 m)	205 lb (93 kg)	1973-04-24	Michigan State
C	17	Anderson Varejão	6 ft 10 in (2.08 m)	240 lb (109 kg)	1982-09-28	Brazil
G	4	David Wesley	6 ft 1 in (1.85 m)	203 lb (92 kg)	1970-11-14	Baylor

Coaches
Head coach
- Mike Brown
Assistant(s)
- Hank Egan
- Melvin Hunt
- Chris Jent
- John Kuester
- Kenny Natt
- Michael Malone

Legend
- (DP) Unsigned draft pick
- (FA) Free agent
- (S) Suspended
- Injured

Roster
Updated: March 26, 2007

=== Player salaries ===
Rank	Player	Salary
1	Larry Hughes	$13,363,012
2	Zydrunas Ilgauskas	$9,422,697
3	Drew Gooden	$6,645,402
4	LeBron James	$6,128,090
5	Eric Snow	$6,093,750
6	Donyell Marshall	$5,633,037
7	Damon Jones	$3,884,678
8	Ira Newble	$3,196,050
9	Scot Pollard	$2,200,000
10	Sasha Pavlović	$1,962,206
11	David Wesley	$1,750,000
12	Shannon Brown	$971,280
13	Anderson Varejão	$945,600
14	Dwayne Jones	$664,209
15	Daniel Gibson	$412,718

== Regular season ==
=== Season standings ===
Central Division	W	L	PCT	GB	Home	Road	Div
y-Detroit Pistons	53	29	.646	-	26–15	27–14	9–7
x-Cleveland Cavaliers	50	32	.610	3	30–11	20–21	10–6
x-Chicago Bulls	49	33	.598	4	31–10	18–23	12–4
Indiana Pacers	35	47	.427	18	22–19	13–28	8–8
Milwaukee Bucks	28	54	.341	25	18–23	10–31	1–15

#	Eastern Conference				
#	Team	W	L	PCT	GB
1	c-Detroit Pistons	53	29	.646	–
2	x-Cleveland Cavaliers	50	32	.610	3
3	y-Toronto Raptors	47	35	.573	6
4	y-Miami Heat	44	38	.537	9
5	x-Chicago Bulls	49	33	.598	4
6	x-New Jersey Nets	41	41	.500	12
7	x-Washington Wizards	41	41	.500	12
8	x-Orlando Magic	40	42	.488	13
9	Philadelphia 76ers	35	47	.427	18
10	Indiana Pacers	35	47	.427	18
11	New York Knicks	33	49	.402	20
12	Charlotte Bobcats	33	49	.402	20
13	Atlanta Hawks	30	52	.366	23
14	Milwaukee Bucks	28	54	.341	25
15	Boston Celtics	24	58	.293	29

== Playoffs ==
=== Game log ===
2007 playoff game log
First Round: 4–0 (home: 2–0; road: 2–0)

Game	Date	Team	Score	High points	High rebounds	High assists	Location Attendance	Series
1	April 22	Washington	W 97–82	Larry Hughes (27)	Anderson Varejão (10)	LeBron James (7)	Quicken Loans Arena; 20,562	1–0
2	April 25	Washington	W 109–102	LeBron James (27)	Drew Gooden (14)	LeBron James (7)	Quicken Loans Arena; 20,562	2–0
3	April 28	@ Washington	W 98–92	LeBron James (30)	Drew Gooden (12)	LeBron James (9)	Verizon Center; 20,173	3–0
4	April 30	@ Washington	W 97–90	LeBron James (31)	Zydrunas Ilgauskas (19)	LeBron James (7)	Verizon Center; 20,173	4–0

Conference Semifinals: 4–2 (home: 2–1; road: 2–1)

Game	Date	Team	Score	High points	High rebounds	High assists	Location Attendance	Series
1	May 6	New Jersey	W 81–77	LeBron James (21)	Gooden, Ilgauskas (14)	LeBron James (7)	Quicken Loans Arena; 20,562	1–0
2	May 8	New Jersey	W 102–92	LeBron James (36)	Drew Gooden (14)	LeBron James (12)	Quicken Loans Arena; 20,562	2–0
3	May 12	@ New Jersey	L 85–96	Larry Hughes (23)	Zydrunas Ilgauskas (8)	LeBron James (12)	Continental Airlines Arena; 20,032	2–1
4	May 14	@ New Jersey	W 87–85	LeBron James (30)	Zydrunas Ilgauskas (11)	LeBron James (7)	Continental Airlines Arena; 20,032	3–1
5	May 16	New Jersey	L 72–83	LeBron James (20)	LeBron James (9)	LeBron James (5)	Quicken Loans Arena; 20,562	3–2
6	May 18	@ New Jersey	W 88–72	LeBron James (23)	LeBron James (8)	LeBron James (8)	Continental Airlines Arena; 20,032	4–2

Conference Finals: 4–2 (home: 3–0; road: 1–2)

Game	Date	Team	Score	High points	High rebounds	High assists	Location Attendance	Series
1	May 21	@ Detroit	L 76–79	Zydrunas Ilgauskas (22)	Zydrunas Ilgauskas (13)	LeBron James (9)	The Palace of Auburn Hills; 22,076	0–1
2	May 24	@ Detroit	L 76–79	LeBron James (19)	Anderson Varejão (14)	LeBron James (7)	The Palace of Auburn Hills; 22,076	0–2
3	May 27	Detroit	W 88–82	LeBron James (32)	LeBron James (9)	LeBron James (9)	Quicken Loans Arena; 20,562	1–2
4	May 29	Detroit	W 91–87	LeBron James (25)	Drew Gooden (8)	LeBron James (11)	Quicken Loans Arena; 20,562	2–2
5	May 31	@ Detroit	W 109–107 (2OT)	LeBron James (48)	Zydrunas Ilgauskas (16)	LeBron James (7)	The Palace of Auburn Hills; 22,076	3–2
6	June 2	Detroit	W 98–82	Daniel Gibson (31)	LeBron James (14)	LeBron James (8)	Quicken Loans Arena; 20,562	4–2

NBA Finals: 0–4 (home: 0–2; road: 0–2)

Game	Date	Team	Score	High points	High rebounds	High assists	Location Attendance	Series
1	June 7	@ San Antonio	L 76–85	Daniel Gibson (16)	LeBron James (7)	James, Gibson (4)	AT&T Center; 18,797	0–1
2	June 10	@ San Antonio	L 92–103	LeBron James (25)	Anderson Varejão (10)	LeBron James (6)	AT&T Center; 18,797	0–2
3	June 12	San Antonio	L 72–75	LeBron James (25)	Zydrunas Ilgauskas (18)	LeBron James (7)	Quicken Loans Arena; 20,562	0–3
4	June 14	San Antonio	L 82–83	LeBron James (24)	Zydrunas Ilgauskas (13)	LeBron James (10)	Quicken Loans Arena; 20,562	0–4

2007 schedule

=== First round ===
A rematch of the previous year's first round series was spoiled when Wizards star Gilbert Arenas and Caron Butler were both forced out of the playoffs due to injuries received in the later parts of the regular season. Without Arenas and Butler, the Wizards found themselves unable to stop LeBron James and the Cleveland Cavaliers from sweeping them out of the playoffs. It was Cleveland's first playoff sweep in franchise history.

=== Eastern Semifinals ===
The Cavaliers advanced to the Eastern Conference finals for the first time since 1992, while the Nets have lost in the conference semifinals in three out of the last four years.

New Jersey Nets point guard Jason Kidd averaged a triple double the entire playoffs, scoring 14.6 points, grabbing 10.9 rebounds and dishing out 10.9 assists per game.

The Cavaliers also got revenge of sorts, by eliminating the Nets two years after the Nets eliminated them on the final day of the regular season.

=== Eastern Finals ===
In a rematch of last year's second-round series, the Pistons and the Cavaliers matched up in perhaps one of the closest contested series in NBA history, with the first five games being decided by 6 points or less. The spotlight of the series fell on Cleveland's LeBron James. Despite gaining some momentum in the opening games of the series against the experienced Pistons, key last-second decisions by James led to Cleveland losses in Games 1 and 2 in Detroit, by identical scores where Cleveland led for most of the two games. They faced a 0–2 deficit for the second straight year but would easily remember from the year before they could win three straight games to get back into the series.

With media circles on his back for his complacency in these games (James had a playoff career low 10 points in Game 1), LeBron came back to will the Cavs to close victories in Games 3 and 4 in Cleveland, evening the series at 2. The series shifted back to Detroit for a Game 5 that proved to be one of the most memorable postseason games in recent NBA history. In a match that went into double overtime, the Cavaliers stunned the Pistons on their home court, thanks to LeBron James' playoff career-high 48 point performance. James scored the Cavaliers' final 25 points of the game, including all 18 points in overtime making it two straight two-point wins at the Palace in Game 5.

This time around the heavily favored Cavaliers took advantage of their home court in 2007 and exploded in Game 6 to close out the Pistons once and for all, and to clinch the franchise's first trip to the NBA Finals. Rookie Daniel Gibson scored his career high 31 points including five three-pointers to lift the Cavs in the second half behind a roaring home crowd.

== NBA Finals ==
=== Game 1 ===
LeBron James and the Cleveland Cavaliers entered the 2007 Finals as newcomers. Game 1 was the first NBA Finals appearance in franchise history, and the first for each of its players (other than reserve point guard Eric Snow). However, the San Antonio Spurs had been to the Finals in three of the past eight seasons, winning a championship each time. With solid performances by Tim Duncan, Tony Parker, and Manu Ginóbili, the Spurs won the series opener in convincing fashion, limiting LeBron James to 14 points on 4–16 shooting.

ABC, ABCHD, TSN, Canal 7, Canal+, ESPN Brasil

June 7
9:00 p.m. ET

1

Cleveland Cavaliers 76, San Antonio Spurs 85
Scoring by quarter: 15–20, 20–20, 14–24, 27–21
Pts: Gibson 16; Rebs: James 7 Asts: James, Gibson 4 each TOs: LeBron James 6	Pts: Parker 27; Rebs: Duncan 13; Asts: Tony Parker 7 Blocks: Tim Duncan 5

AT&T Center, San Antonio
Attendance: 18,797
Referees: Ken Mauer, Mike Callahan, Steve Javie

=== Game 2 ===
The Spurs took a stranglehold on momentum in Game 2. The Spurs big three overwhelmed the Cavs and the Spurs led by as many as 29 points in the third quarter. They absolutely dominated game during first 3 quarters and played show-time basketball. A furious 25–6 rally by Cleveland in the final quarter wasn't enough as the Spurs took a 2–0 lead in the series.

ABC, ABCHD, TSN, Canal 7, Canal+, ESPN Brasil

June 10
9:00 p.m. ET

2

Cleveland Cavaliers 92, San Antonio Spurs 103
Scoring by quarter: 17–28, 16–30, 29–31, 30–14
Pts: LeBron James 25; Rebs: Anderson Varejão 10; Asts: LeBron James 6 TOs: LeBron James 6	Pts: Tony Parker 30; Rebs: Duncan, Horry 9 each Asts: Tim Duncan 8 Blocks: Robert Horry 5

AT&T Center, San Antonio
Attendance: 18,797
Referees: Dick Bavetta, Jim Clark, Joe Derosa

=== Game 3 ===
Rookie Daniel Gibson started Game 3 in place of the injured Larry Hughes but scored a series-low 2 points on 1–10 shooting. As a team the Cavs shot only .367 but out-rebounded the Spurs 48–41. Zydrunas Ilgauskas had a 2006–07 season high 18 rebounds. On the game's final play, LeBron James missed a potential game-tying 29 foot 3-pointer (which he contested as a foul on Bruce Bowen).

Game 3 was the lowest-scoring Finals game since 1955, with Tim Duncan of the Spurs having his lowest scoring game in his NBA Finals career, with 14 points.

ABC, ABCHD, TSN, Canal 7, Canal+, ESPN Brasil

June 12
9:00 p.m. ET

3

San Antonio Spurs 75, Cleveland Cavaliers 72
Scoring by quarter: 16–18, 24–20, 15–12, 20–22
Pts: Tony Parker 17; Rebs: Duncan, Bowen 9 each Asts: Manu Ginóbili 5 Stls: Michael Finley 4	Pts: LeBron James 25; Rebs: Ilgauskas 18; Asts: LeBron James 7 TOs: LeBron James 5
San Antonio leads series 3-0

Quicken Loans Arena, Cleveland
Attendance: 20,562
Referees: Bernie Fryer, Bob Delaney, Dan Crawford

=== Game 4 ===
San Antonio started out strong through the first three quarters, leading by as many as 11. Cleveland would stage a rally near the end of the third quarter and the first five minutes of the fourth, scoring 14 consecutive points to take its first second-half lead of the series. However, the Spurs would stage a 12–3 rally of their own to retake the lead and win the series in a 4–0 sweep.

ABC, ABCHD, TSN, Canal 7, Canal+, ESPN Brasil, Sport 1

June 14
9:00 p.m. ET

4

San Antonio Spurs 83, Cleveland Cavaliers 82
Scoring by quarter: 19–20, 20–14, 21–18, 22–27
Pts: Manu Ginóbili 27; Rebs: Tim Duncan 15; Asts: Manu Ginóbili 5 TOs: Tim Duncan 6	Pts: LeBron James 24; Rebs: Ilgauskas 13; Asts: LeBron James 10; TOs: LeBron James 6
San Antonio wins series 4–0

Quicken Loans Arena, Cleveland
Attendance: 20,562
Referees: Bennett Salvatore, Joe Forte, Eddie F. Rush

== Player statistics ==
Legend
GP	Games played	GS	Games started	MPG	Minutes per game
FG%	Field-goal percentage	3P%	3-point field-goal percentage	FT%	Free-throw percentage
RPG	Rebounds per game	APG	Assists per game	SPG	Steals per game
BPG	Blocks per game	PPG	Points per game

=== Regular season ===
Player	GP	GS	MPG	FG%	FT%	3P%	SPG	BPG	APG	RPG	PPG
LeBron James	78	78	40.9	47.6%	69.8%	31.9%	1.60	.71	6.0	6.7	27.3
Larry Hughes	70	68	37.1	40.0%	67.6%	33.3%	1.27	.37	3.7	3.8	14.9
Zydrunas Ilgauskas	78	78	27.3	45.5%	80.7%	0.0%	.62	1.26	1.6	7.7	11.9
Drew Gooden	80	80	28.0	47.3%	71.4%	16.7%	.88	.35	1.1	8.5	11.1
Sasha Pavlović	67	28	22.9	45.3%	79.4%	40.5%	.82	.25	1.6	2.4	9.0
Donyell Marshall	81	0	16.8	42.4%	66.3%	35.1%	.48	.53	.6	4.0	7.0
Anderson Varejão	81	6	21.9	47.6%	61.6%	0.0%	.94	.64	.9	6.7	6.8
Damon Jones	60	0	19.6	38.6%	68.2%	38.5%	.27	.03	1.6	1.1	6.6
Daniel Gibson	60	16	16.5	42.4%	71.8%	41.9%	.38	.13	1.2	1.5	4.6
Eric Snow	82	45	23.5	41.7%	63.7%	0.0%	.67	.20	4.0	2.3	4.2
Shannon Brown	23	5	8.8	37.8%	71.4%	28.0%	.30	.13	.4	.9	3.2
Ira Newble	15	1	8.6	43.2%	60.6%	53.3%	.40	.00	.1	2.0	3.1
David Wesley	35	5	10.1	29.3%	79.4%	23.7%	.34	.11	1.1	1.0	2.1
Scot Pollard	24	0	4.5	42.3%	50.0%	0.0%	.17	.04	.1	1.3	1.0
Dwayne Jones	4	0	4.5	0.0%	50.0%	0.0%	.00	.00	.0	1.5	.8

=== Playoffs ===
Player	GP	GS	MPG	FG%	FT%	3P%	SPG	BPG	APG	RPG	PPG
LeBron James	20	20	44.7	41.6%	75.5%	28.0%	1.70	.50	8.0	8.1	25.1
Zydrunas Ilgauskas	20	20	32.5	49.2%	83.8%	0.0%	.45	.80	.9	9.7	12.6
Drew Gooden	20	20	30.3	49.3%	76.9%	0.0%	.50	.45	1.0	8.0	11.4
Larry Hughes	18	18	35.5	34.7%	74.6%	35.2%	1.39	.44	2.4	3.9	11.3
Sasha Pavlović	20	20	30.8	38.1%	52.8%	34.5%	.95	.25	1.6	2.6	9.2
Daniel Gibson	20	2	20.1	43.1%	88.4%	40.9%	.60	.20	1.1	1.6	8.3
Anderson Varejão	20	0	22.4	51.1%	56.3%	0.0%	1.05	.55	.6	6.0	6.0
Donyell Marshall	19	0	10.7	33.3%	63.6%	31.1%	.16	.21	.3	2.2	3.5
Damon Jones	11	0	12.6	30.8%	1.000%	31.8%	.00	.00	1.0	.8	2.4
Eric Snow	19	0	12.8	31.6%	57.1%	0.0%	.58	.11	1.5	1.5	1.7
Ira Newble	6	0	1.7	0.0%	0.0%	0.0%	.00	.00	.2	.2	0.0
Scot Pollard	3	0	1.0	0.0%	0.0%	0.0%	.00	.00	.0	0.0	0.0
Shannon Brown	1	0	1.0	0.0%	0.0%	0.0%	.00	.00	.0	0.0	0.0

== Awards and records ==
=== Awards ===
- LeBron James was named the Eastern Conference Player of the Week for games played from November 13 through November 19.
- LeBron James was named the Eastern Conference Player of the Week for games played from March 5 through March 11.
- LeBron James was named the Eastern Conference Player of the Month for the month of March, the fifth time he has won the award.
- After the season, LeBron James was named to the All-NBA second team as a forward.

=== Records ===
- On November 25, Zydrunas Ilgauskas tied a franchise record for offensive rebounds in a half (10) and in a game (12) in the Cavs' 108–95 victory over the Philadelphia 76ers.
- On December 6, Zydrunas Ilgauskas became the all-time offensive rebound leader in Cavs history in a 95–91 win over the Toronto Raptors.
- In Game 5 of the Eastern Conference finals, LeBron James set or tied franchise playoff records for: points in a game (48), points in overtime (9), field goals made and attempted in a game (18, 33) and field goals made in overtime (4).
- In Game 6 of the Eastern Conference finals, Daniel Gibson set or tied franchise playoff records for: points in a quarter (19), points in a half (25), rookie points in a game (31) and three-pointers in a half (5).
- With his 19th playoff win, coach Mike Brown set the franchise record for playoff victories.

=== Milestones ===
- On December 23, LeBron James became the youngest player in NBA history to score 7,000 career points (21 years, 359 days).
- In the 2006–07 season, the Cavaliers swept all four California teams for the first time in team history (Golden State, Sacramento, LA Lakers, LA Clippers)
- On March 14, LeBron James became the youngest player in NBA history to score 8,000 career points (22 years, 74 days).
- On April 6, LeBron James became the 2nd fastest player to record 8,000 points, 2,000 rebounds and 2,000 assists in a career. LeBron did it in 311 games while it took Oscar Robertson 269 games and Michael Jordan 339.
- On April 14, the Cavaliers played the 3,000th game in franchise history

=== All-Star ===
- LeBron James led all players in votes received and was voted in as a starter for the 2007 NBA All-Star Game. His 2,516,049 votes were the second most in NBA history. He became the first player in team history to lead the league in votes.
- LeBron James led the Eastern Conference All-Stars with 28 points, 6 rebounds and 6 assists in the 132–153 loss.
- Damon Jones participated in the Three Point Contest and finished in 5th place.
- LeBron James participated in the Skills Challenge and finished in 3rd place.

== Transactions ==
=== Trades ===
The Cavaliers did not make a trade during the 2006–07 NBA season.

=== Free agents ===
The Cavaliers did not sign any free agents during the 2006–07 NBA season.

=== Development League ===
- On March 2, Shannon Brown was assigned to the NBDL's Albuquerque Thunderbirds.
- On March 3, Shannon Brown was recalled from the Thunderbirds.
- On March 23, Dwayne Jones was assigned to the Thunderbirds.
- On March 27, Dwayne Jones was recalled from the Thunderbirds.
