= Cydney Gillon =

American bodybuilder and reality television contestant

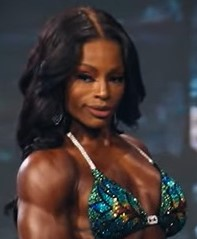
- Gillon in 2024
- Born: September 14, 1992 (age 34)
- Occupations: Figure athlete, fitness model, posing coach
- Television: Survivor: Kaôh Rōng
- Height: 5 ft 4 in (1.63 m)

Cydney Gillon (born September 14, 1992) is an American IFBB professional figure and fitness competitor. She is the 2nd African-American woman to win the IFBB Figure Olympia competition and the first 8-time consecutive winner of the IFBB Figure Olympia competition (2017 to 2024).

== Early life ==
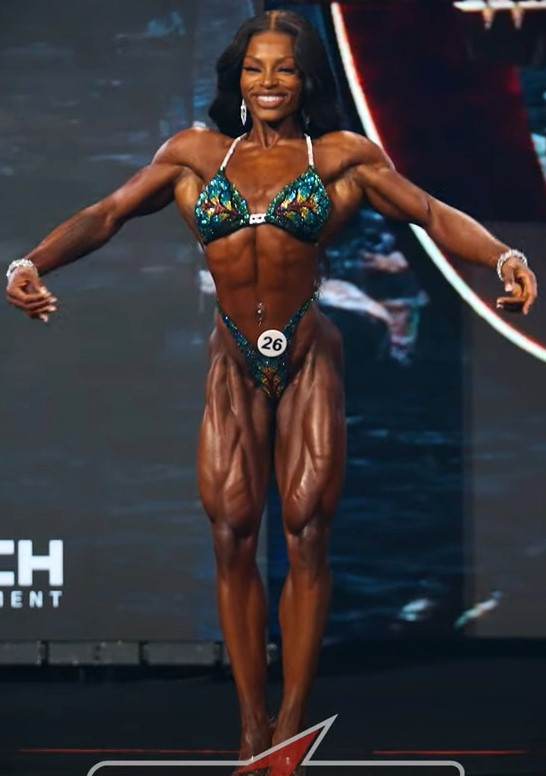
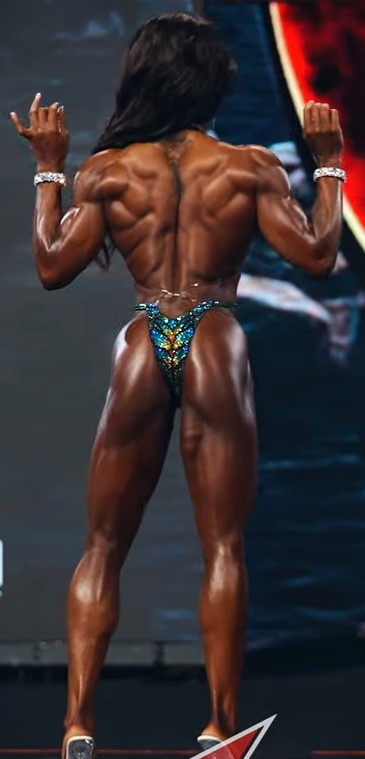
Gillon at the 2024 Figure Olympia finals

Gillon attended the University of Pennsylvania where she got a degree in psychology from the University of Pennsylvania School of Arts and Sciences. She also competed on the track team for University of Pennsylvania from 2010 to 2014.

== Survivor ==
Gillon was a contestant on Survivor: Kaôh Rōng in 2016. She finished in 4th place after losing a tie-breaker fire making challenge to Aubry Bracco and lasted a total of 37 days in the game.

== Beast Games ==
Gillon was a contestant on Beast Games season 2. She wore the number 129 on her blue jumpsuit. Competing on the strong team, she finished 41st and was eliminated on the obstacle course section of Episode 3.
