= Joe Del Campo =

American investigator and television contestant

- Born: July 4, 1943 (age 83); Philadelphia, Pennsylvania, U.S.
- Education: La Salle University (B.A.); University of Wisconsin–Milwaukee (M.S.)
- Occupations: FBI agent, private investigator, television personality
- Television: Survivor: Kaôh Rōng
- Children: 3
- Website: delcampo.homestead.com

Joseph P. Del Campo (born July 4, 1943) is an American FBI agent and private investigator best known for competing on the reality competition show Survivor.

== Early life ==
Del Campo was born July 4, 1943, in Philadelphia, Pennsylvania. He attended Father Judge High School in Philadelphia, then enrolled at nearby La Salle University, majoring in Spanish. Part of his college curriculum had him studying abroad, at the University of Madrid. He completed his Bachelor of Arts degree at La Salle in 1967.

Following college, Del Campo enlisted in the United States Naval Reserve, during which time he attended Aviation Officer Candidate School at Naval Air Station Pensacola in Florida. After issues with his sinuses prevented him from completing his pilot accreditation, he was transferred to Miami where he began working in the field of intelligence. One of his duties was to keep Cuban spies from infiltrating the refugee population entering the United States.

== Career ==
Del Campo left the Naval Reserve as a lieutenant (junior grade) in 1971. From there, he joined the FBI as a special agent in Urbana, Illinois. He would spend the next 25 years with the Bureau, working all over the country in such places as Washington, D.C., Milwaukee, Miami, and Philadelphia.

He was once partnered with famed FBI agent John E. Douglas during the 1970s, when they were assigned to work as bank robbery investigators in Milwaukee. In 1975, while working as an investigator of organized crime, Del Campo earned a Master of Science degree in Educational Administration and Supervision, from the University of Wisconsin–Milwaukee.

One of the most notable moments of Del Campo's career came one winter's day, when he saved a child being held hostage. A fugitive from Chicago had made his way to Milwaukee and proceeded to shoot a few officers before taking a young boy hostage. As the fugitive was trying to escape with the boy, Del Campo climbed onto the steep, icy roof of a house, took aim with his gun, and fired. The fugitive was hit in the back of the neck, and the boy escaped unharmed.

In 1996, Del Campo retired from the FBI, moved to Vero Beach, Florida, and founded his own private investigator company, called The Excalibur Group. He has also served as a guest commentator on Fox News Channel's On the Record w/ Greta Van Susteren.

== Survivor ==
In 2015, Del Campo, at the age of 71, was selected as one of 18 castaways to compete on Survivor: Kaôh Rōng, the 32nd season of Survivor overall. As the theme of the season was Brains vs. Brawn vs. Beauty, he was assigned to "Brains" and thus placed on the Chan Loh tribe at the very start. As the oldest player of the season, he made an early alliance with Debbie Wanner, who happened to be the eldest woman of that season. On Day 12, he and Wanner were separated when the tribes were switched around, as he ended up moving to the Gondol tribe, along with fellow Brains Aubry Bracco and Peter Baggenstos, while Wanner ended up staying on Chan Loh with fellow Brain Neal Gottlieb.

On Day 17, the remaining tribes merged, allowing Del Campo and Wanner to reunite, along with Bracco and Gottlieb, the other two Brains left in the game. The Brains were at a numbers disadvantage, though, as the old Brawns and Beauties bonded together to form their own alliance. This was further exacerbated when Gottlieb was medically evacuated on Day 19 due to a leg infection. By the next Tribal Council, a new all-female alliance had formed, and Del Campo affiliated with them, voting out Nick Maiorano. But on Day 24, Del Campo refused to vote out his ally Wanner, who ended up getting eliminated anyway by the women.

When it got to the Final Five on Day 33, Del Campo won his first challenge, which was for reward. During the reward, he enjoyed a huge picnic lunch which included a large helping of steak kebabs. After returning to camp, he started to feel ill, and on Day 34, medical help was summoned. Doctors concluded that Del Campo was suffering from blockage in his stomach, as a result of excess beef consumption, and ordered him to be evacuated, thus ending his game at fifth place overall. He would become the seventh member of the jury.

At the Final Tribal Council, he cast his vote for Bracco to win the game, although Michele Fitzgerald would end up winning the title of Sole Survivor.

== Personal life ==
Del Campo is a widower with three sons. In his spare time, he and Linda Worsham, Vice President of The Excalibur Group, volunteer rescuing Yorkshire Terriers in the Vero Beach area. He has also contributed articles to Vero's Voice, a magazine serving communities along the central Atlantic coast of Florida.
