= Survivor: Kaôh Rōng =

- Season 32
- Region 1 DVD cover
- Presented by: Jeff Probst
- No. of days: 39
- No. of castaways: 18
- Winner: Michele Fitzgerald
- Runner-up: Aubry Bracco
- Location: Koh Rong, Cambodia
- Sia Fan Favourite Prize: Tai Trang
- No. of episodes: 15

Release
- Original network: CBS
- Original release: February 17 – May 18, 2016

Additional information
- Filming dates: March 30 – May 7, 2015

Season chronology
- ← Previous; Cambodia — Second Chance Next → Millennials vs. Gen X

Survivor: Kaôh Rōng — Brains vs. Brawn vs. Beauty (commonly referred to as Survivor: Kaôh Rōng) is the 32nd season of the American competitive reality television series Survivor. It was originally broadcast by CBS between February 17 and May 18, 2016. The season featured 18 new contestants divided into three tribes based on their personal attributes; with "Chan Loh," "Gondol," and "To Tang" representing "Brain," "Beauty," and "Brawn," respectively. It is the second season of Survivor to divide their starting tribes this way, following Survivor: Cagayan.

Filming took place on the island of Koh Rong in Cambodia between March 30 and May 7, 2015. It was filmed before season 31, Survivor: Cambodia, though aired after, with both seasons filmed back-to-back in the same location. Survivor: Kaôh Rōng introduced two new game mechanics to the show: a feature whereby two hidden immunity idols could be combined into one single idol that could be played after the votes were read, and the power to remove a member of the jury, given to the finalist who won the final reward challenge.

After 39 days, Michele Fitzgerald was named the Sole Survivor over fellow finalists Aubry Bracco and Tai Trang in a jury vote of 5–2–0, thus winning the US$1,000,000 prize. The season received a positive critical reception, with many praising its unpredictability and strong finalists. It also performed well in ratings, as it became the highest-rated unscripted program among adults in all demographics.

== Overview ==
Survivor is a reality television show based on the Swedish show Expedition Robinson, created by Mark Burnett and Charlie Parsons. The series follows a number of participants isolated in a remote location, where they must provide food, fire, and shelter. One by one, a participant is removed from the series by majority vote, with challenges held to give a reward (ranging from living- and food-related prizes to a car) and immunity from being voted out of the series. The last remaining player receives a prize of $1,000,000.

== Production ==
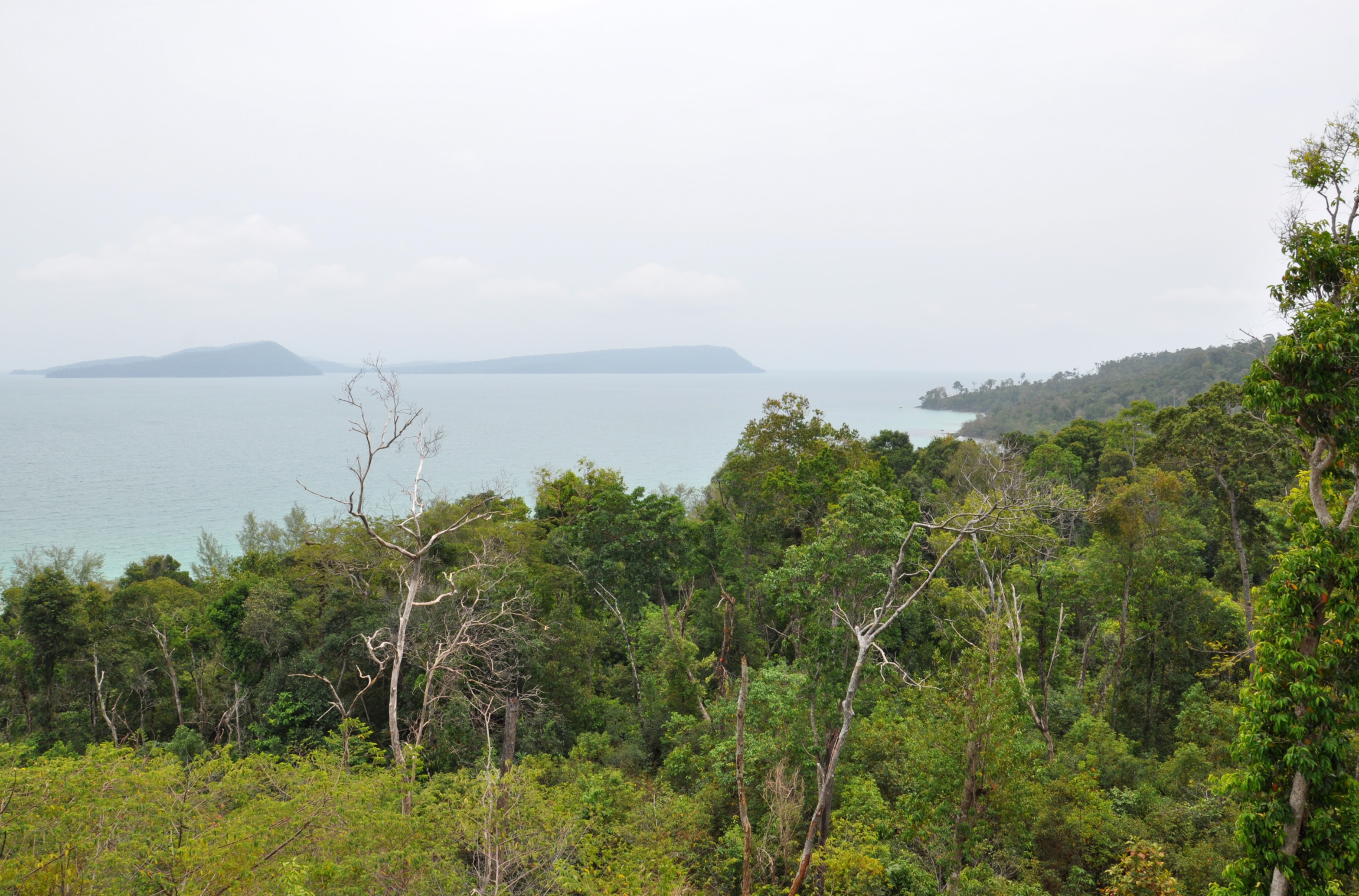
The season filmed in Koh Rong in Cambodia.

Survivor: Kaôh Rōng was filmed on the island of Koh Rong in Cambodia between March 30 and May 7, 2015. The season originally aired on CBS between February 17 and May 18, 2016. Although it was filmed before Survivor: Cambodia, it aired after, marking the first time the show aired its seasons out of filming order. As it was filmed first, it became the first CBS reality show to film in Cambodia. Three medical evacuations from the game occurred during the season's filming, the most to ever occur during a single season. Host Jeff Probst named the first of the three evacuations, which occurred during a challenge, the most frightening moment in the show's history. A previous season of Koh-Lanta, a French variant of Survivor, which filmed there saw a contestant die during its first challenge, resulting in the cancellation of its thirteenth season.

The 18 new contestants were divided into three tribes based on personal attributes: "Chan Loh" ("Brains"), "Gondol" ("Beauty"), and "To Tang" ("Brawn"). Kaôh Rōng became the second season to employ this theme, after Survivor: Cagayan, season 28. Probst said that the decision to do the theme again emerged during casting: "As we started seeing people, it became obvious we had another really clear division of brains, brawn, and beauty."

The season introduced a new mechanic for the show's hidden immunity idol to the game, being that if two were used together, they could be used to save a player from elimination after they had been voted out. It later introduced a new advantage, which allowed a member of the final three to remove a member of the jury at Tribal Council after winning a final Reward Challenge.

== Contestants ==
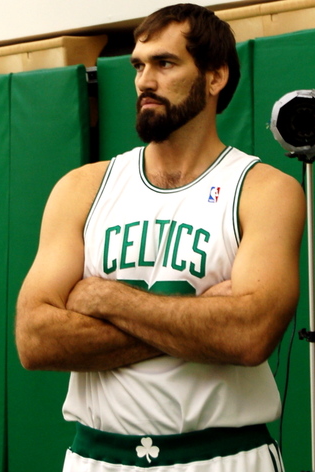
Scot Pollard

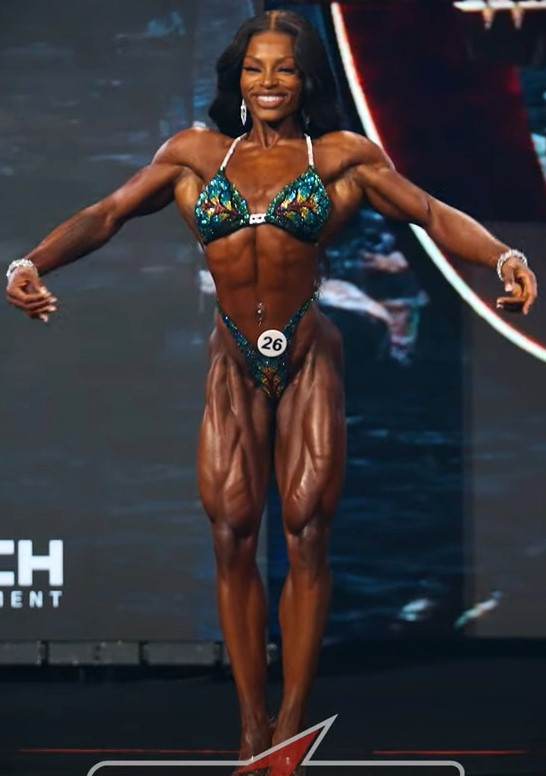
Cydney Gillon

The cast is composed of 18 new players, initially split into three tribes of six based on personal attributes: "Chan Loh" ("Brains"), "Gondol" ("Beauty"), and "To Tang" ("Brawn"). On Day 12, the remaining 13 players were redivided into "Chan Loh" and "Gondol". On Day 17, the 11 remaining players merged into one tribe, "Dara", named after the Khmer word for "star", for the remainder of the game. Notable castaways include former NBA player Scot Pollard.

List of Survivor: Kaôh Rōng contestants
Contestant	Age	From	Tribe			Finish	
Contestant	Age	From	Original	Switched	Merged	Placement	Day
Darnell Hamilton	27	Chicago, Illinois	To Tang			1st voted out	Day 3
Jennifer Lanzetti	38	Salt Lake City, Utah	To Tang			2nd voted out	Day 6
Liz Markham	27	New York, New York	Chan Loh			3rd voted out	Day 8
Caleb Reynolds	27	Hopkinsville, Kentucky	Gondol			Medically evacuated	Day 9
Alecia Holden	24	Dallas, Texas	To Tang			4th voted out	Day 11
Anna Khait	26	Brooklyn, New York	Gondol	Gondol		5th voted out	Day 13
Peter Baggenstos	34	Minneapolis, Minnesota	Chan Loh	Gondol		6th voted out	Day 16
Neal Gottlieb	38	Sausalito, California	Chan Loh	Chan Loh	Dara	Medically evacuated Removed from jury (Note: On Day 38, for winning the final reward challenge, Michele earned the power to eliminate one of the jurors. She chose Neal.)	Day 19
Nick Maiorano	30	Redondo Beach, California	Gondol	Chan Loh	Dara	7th voted out 1st jury member	Day 22
Debbie Wanner	49	Reading, Pennsylvania	Chan Loh	Chan Loh	Dara	8th voted out 2nd jury member	Day 24
Scot Pollard	40	Carmel, Indiana	To Tang	Gondol	Dara	9th voted out 3rd jury member	Day 27
Julia Sokolowski	19	Boston, Massachusetts	Gondol	Gondol	Dara	10th voted out 4th jury member	Day 29
Kyle Jason	31	Detroit, Michigan	To Tang	Chan Loh	Dara	11th voted out 5th jury member	Day 32
Joe Del Campo	71	Vero Beach, Florida	Chan Loh	Gondol	Dara	Medically evacuated 6th jury member	Day 34
Cydney Gillon	22	Douglasville, Georgia	To Tang	Chan Loh	Dara	12th voted out 7th jury member	Day 37
Tai Trang	51	San Francisco, California	Gondol	Gondol	Dara	2nd runner-up	Day 39
Aubry Bracco	29	Cambridge, Massachusetts	Chan Loh	Gondol	Dara	Runner-up	Day 39
Michele Fitzgerald	24	Freehold, New Jersey	Gondol	Chan Loh	Dara	Sole Survivor	Day 39

=== Future appearances ===
Caleb Reynolds, Debbie Wanner, Aubry Bracco, and Tai Trang returned for Survivor: Game Changers. Bracco returned again for Survivor: Edge of Extinction. Michele Fitzgerald returned to compete on Survivor: Winners at War. Bracco once again competed on Survivor 50: In the Hands of the Fans.

Outside of Survivor, Reynolds competed on the premiere of Candy Crush. Reynolds also competed on a Survivor vs Big Brother episode of Fear Factor. Fitzgerald competed on the thirty-seventh, thirty-eighth, thirty-ninth, and fortieth seasons of The Challenge, and also on the second season of The Challenge: USA. She has also been announced as a contestant for the sixth season of The Traitors, which is scheduled to stream in 2027. Cydney Gillon competed on Beast Games: Strong vs. Smart.

== Season summary ==
The 18 new castaways were divided into three tribes based on primary attribute: Chan Loh (Brains), To Tang (Brawn) and Gondol (Beauty). Though the Brawn lost three of the first four immunity challenges, being reduced to only Cydney, Jason, and Scot, all three survived through the tribe swap, reaching the merge alongside four Brains and four Beauties.

Upon merging, the Brawns and Beauties initially aligned against the Brains but, put off by their male allies’ attitudes, the Brawn-Beauty women (Cydney, Julia and Michele) decided to team up with the Brains instead to form a new majority alliance. Though the minority alliance of Jason, Scot and Tai had two hidden immunity idols, Aubry convinced Tai to betray his allies, getting rid of one of the idols and joining the majority.

Aubry and Cydney were the primary strategists of their alliance, and turned against each other when there were four players remaining; Aubry won the tiebreaker to join Michele and Tai in the finals. The next day, Michele won a challenge against Tai and Aubry in which she had the power to remove a member of the jury from the Final Tribal Council. She chose Neal, due to his support of Aubry's game and his persuasiveness.

At the Final Tribal Council, Tai had difficulty explaining his choices, and was accused of having played his idols and advantages at the wrong time - especially by Scot, who was eliminated due to Tai withholding his idol. Aubry and Michele both emphasized how different their games were, with Aubry stating that she made multiple strategic moves to position herself in the game and making fire two nights ago. However, they felt that her social connections were lacking in comparison to Michele. Michele stated that even though she did cruise until the merge, that she still affected the game largely due to her relaxed social game. In the end, Michele beat Aubry and Tai in a vote of 5–2–0.

Challenge winners and eliminations by episodes
Episode			Challenge winner(s)		Eliminated	
No.	Title	Original air date	Reward	Immunity	Tribe	Player
1	"I'm a Mental Giant"	February 17, 2016	Chan Loh		To Tang	Darnell
1	"I'm a Mental Giant"	February 17, 2016	Gondol		To Tang	Darnell
2	"Kindergarten Camp"	February 24, 2016	Gondol		To Tang	Jennifer
2	"Kindergarten Camp"	February 24, 2016	Chan Loh		To Tang	Jennifer
3	"The Circle of Life"	March 2, 2016	Gondol		Chan Loh	Liz
3	"The Circle of Life"	March 2, 2016	To Tang		Chan Loh	Liz
4	"Signed, Sealed and Delivered"	March 9, 2016	Chan Loh	Chan Loh	Gondol	Caleb
4	"Signed, Sealed and Delivered"	March 9, 2016	Gondol	Gondol	To Tang	Alecia
5	"The Devils We Know"	March 16, 2016	None (Note: There was no reward challenge due to the tribe switch.)	Julia (Note: Julia drew the sole To Tang buff during the tribe swap. As a result, she was exiled to the To Tang camp, and later joined the tribe that lost the next Immunity Challenge: Gondol.) (To Tang)	Gondol	Anna
5	"The Devils We Know"	March 16, 2016	None	Chan Loh	Gondol	Anna
6	"Play or Go Home"	March 23, 2016	Gondol	Chan Loh	Gondol	Peter
7	"It's Merge Time"	March 30, 2016	None (Note: There was no reward challenge due to the merge.)	Nick	Dara	Neal
8	"The Jocks vs. the Pretty People"	April 6, 2016	Debbie, Julia, Nick, Scot, Tai	Tai	Dara	Nick
9	"It's Psychological Warfare"	April 13, 2016	Jason, Julia, Scot, Tai	Julia	Dara	Debbie
10	"I'm Not Here to Make Good Friends"	April 20, 2016	Julia (Note: There were three separate reward challenges held simultaneously. Each one was for a different reward, and players could only choose one challenge in which to participate.)	Jason	Dara	Scot
10	"I'm Not Here to Make Good Friends"	April 20, 2016	Michele	Jason	Dara	Scot
10	"I'm Not Here to Make Good Friends"	April 20, 2016	Tai	Jason	Dara	Scot
11	"It’s a ‘Me’ Game, Not a ‘We’ Game"	April 27, 2016	Cydney, Michele [Aubry]	Michele	Dara	Julia
12	"Now’s the Time to Start Scheming"	May 4, 2016	Jason, Michele, Tai	Cydney	Dara	Jason
13	"With Me or Not With Me"	May 11, 2016	Joe [Aubry, Cydney]	None (Note: There was no immunity challenge due to Joe's evacuation from the game.)	Dara	Joe
14	"Not Going Down Without a Fight"	May 18, 2016	Aubry [Cydney]	Michele	Dara	Cydney
14	"Not Going Down Without a Fight"	May 18, 2016	Michele (Note: For winning the final reward challenge, Michele earned the right to eliminate one of the jurors. She chose Neal.)	No immunity challenge or elimination due to the Jury Elimination.		
15	"Reunion"	May 18, 2016				

== Episodes ==
No. overall	No. in season	Title	CBS recap	Rating/share (18-49)	Original release date	U.S. viewers (millions)	Weekly rank
471	1	"I'm a Mental Giant"	Recap	1.9/7	February 17, 2016	8.30	13
The eighteen new castaways, divided into three tribes of six, were given two minutes to ransack a boat filled with supplies and load them onto their rafts. While on the boat, Tai from Gondol grabbed a chicken which he brought to camp; he later christened this chicken "Mark", after series producer Mark Burnett. Upon arriving at camp, Jason from the Brawn tribe formed multiple alliances, including one with Jennifer and Scot and another with Cydney, and targeted Alecia for her perceived weakness. Later, a bug crawled into Jennifer's ear, which caused her pain, but Scot was able to pull it out. On the Brains tribe, Debbie was unable to back up her claim about knowing how to make fire without flint, and Aubry, Liz, Neal and Peter formed an alliance against the older Debbie and Joe. Aubry had a panic attack and was consoled by her tribe mates, but they worried about her behaviour. The women of the Beauty tribe—Anna, Julia and Michele—quickly bonded. Though they considered recruiting Tai to be the fourth member of their alliance, they lost trust in him after they caught him looking for a hidden immunity idol.: Reward/Immunity challenge: The tribes swam out to a boat, where members dove down one at a time to retrieve paddles. They then paddled to shore where they converted their boat to a cart, then pulled it up a track. They then chose between two options: assembling a puzzle, or stacking balls while standing on a wobbly platform. The first two tribes to complete their chosen final tasks won immunity. The first tribe to win also won a fire-making kit and a tarp, while the second-place tribe won flint.; Darnell lost the Brawn tribe's diving mask, which caused them to struggle retrieving their paddles; though they recovered during the cart-pulling portion, Alecia panicked on the puzzle and they lost the challenge. Back at camp, Alecia and Darnell were targeted due to their struggles in the challenge. Scot told Alecia not to scheme because they were voting against Darnell, but she continued to campaign for her safety, which angered him and Cydney. At Tribal Council, Darnell's pleas convinced Cydney and Jason to vote against Alecia, which caused a tie between her and Darnell. But on the revote, Darnell was unanimously voted out.
472	2	"Kindergarten Camp"	Recap	1.9/6	February 24, 2016	8.39	15
At the Beauty camp, Tai found the hidden immunity idol inside a locked box buried beneath a tree, with instructions to find the key at the top of another tree, but he was unable to retrieve the key. He later bonded with Caleb despite their vastly different personalities and lifestyles. On the Brains tribe, Debbie continued to annoy her tribe with her constant bragging, while Joe and Liz fought over camp life. At the Brawn camp, tribe outsider Alecia gave the tribe fire after trying for five hours.: Reward/Immunity challenge: The tribes raced down a river to retrieve a 300-pound log, and then carried it through a series of obstacles. At the end of the course, the tribes removed balls attached to the log, then launched them with a slingshot. The first tribe to hit their two targets won immunity and fishing gear, while the second tribe to do so won immunity and a smaller fishing kit.; Beauty placed first, with Brains in second. Back at the Brawn camp, Jason and Scot continued to target Alecia. However, Jennifer convinced Alecia and Cydney to form a girls' alliance and target Jason, though she later had second thoughts. At Tribal Council, Jennifer revealed that there had been multiple plans floating around, which alarmed Jason and Scot. After being questioned, Jennifer outed the girls' plan to vote Jason out and blamed Alecia, who denied it. Ultimately, Alecia, Cydney and Jason decided Jennifer couldn't be trusted, and she was voted out.
473	3	"The Circle of Life"	Recap	2.2/8	March 2, 2016	9.24	5
Though she was spared again at Tribal Council, Alecia was still on the outs of the Brawn tribe. She found a clue to the hidden immunity idol, which she shared with Cydney, but Cydney secretly tipped off Jason and Scot, and all four raced to claim the idol for themselves. With Scot's help, Jason snatched the key to unlock the idol. At the Beauty camp, Tai also retrieved the key to unlock his tribe's hidden immunity idol; Jason, Scot and Tai discovered that two hidden immunity idols could be combined into a "super idol" that could be played after the votes are read at Tribal Council. Later at the Beauty camp, Tai reluctantly helped kill one of their chickens, but was comforted by the rest of his tribe except for Nick, who offered no empathy. Nick's attitude set the girls against him, and Anna asked Caleb to join up with the girls to vote Nick out. On Brains, Liz and Peter decided to betray their initial alliance with Aubry and Neal, who they perceived as bigger threats and less loyal than Debbie and Joe. However, Debbie and Joe disapproved of Liz and Peter's arrogance, and aligned with Aubry and Neal against them.: Reward/Immunity challenge: The tribes jumped off a platform and swam out to a boat, where they retrieved three bags of rice. They then pushed the bags through a hole in a wooden gate, then went back to the beach through a balance beam. After retrieving three balls from the rice bags, they used them to navigate a vertical maze. The first two tribes to get all three balls to the top of the maze won immunity; the first-place tribe also won a choice between comfort items, including pillows and blankets, or items from home, with the other option going to the second-place tribe.; Beauty placed first, while Brawn beat Brains by mere inches to win their first challenge. Back at the Brains camp, Liz and Peter planned to eliminate Neal for being the biggest perceived threat to them. Though they conspired with Debbie and Joe to split the votes between Aubry and Neal in case of an idol, Debbie and Joe didn't trust them, and told Aubry and Neal of the plan. At Tribal Council, Peter revealed the plan to eliminate Neal but, when the votes were revealed, they were tied two apiece between Aubry, Liz, and Peter. On the revote, Liz was unanimously voted out.
474	4	"Signed, Sealed and Delivered"	Recap	2.1/8	March 9, 2016	9.26	7
After Liz's elimination, Peter vowed to turn on his Brains tribe-mates once the tribes were swapped or merged.: Reward challenge: The tribes dug themselves under a log and then raced to a sandpit, where they dug up three bags of balls; one tribe-mate then rolled the balls up a ramp. The first tribe to roll their balls into the six slots won a kitchen set including pots, spices and coffee, while the second-place tribe won a smaller kitchen set.; After the tribes dug in the grueling heat for nearly an hour, the Brains tribe placed first, with Beauty in second. During the challenge, Debbie was treated for heat stroke and exhaustion, but recovered. Following the challenge, Caleb and Cydney were also treated for this; Caleb was medically evacuated from the game after his heart rate continued to drop. Back at the Brawn camp, Alecia confronted Scot for telling her to "keep cheerleading" during the challenge, which further alienated her from her tribe-mates.: Immunity challenge: Two tribe-mates raced into the jungle and climbed up a ladder to retrieve puzzle pieces; the two other tribe-mates swam out into the ocean and dived down to retrieve more puzzle pieces. Two tribe-mates then used the pieces to solve a puzzle; the first two tribes to solve the puzzle won immunity.; After the Brawn tribe lost yet again, Scot openly claimed that Alecia had no chance of surviving the upcoming Tribal Council. Jeff offered to hold an elimination vote on the spot if the tribe would unanimously agree to it, but Alecia bluntly told Jeff there was no way she would go along with that. Later that night, the tribe carried forward Scot's take that Alecia had no chance, so Jeff wrapped up the discussion quickly and Alecia indeed was voted out unanimously.
475	5	"The Devils We Know"	Recap	2.1/8	March 16, 2016	9.50	7
Neal found the Brains tribe’s hidden immunity idol. Later that day, the 13 remaining castaways were shuffled by random draw into two tribes of six, with the leftover castaway exiled to the former Brawn camp and joining the tribe who lost the next immunity challenge the day after their Tribal Council. The Chan Loh tribe was Brains Debbie and Neal, Brawns Cydney and Jason, and Beauties Michele and Nick; the Gondol tribe was Brains Aubry, Joe and Peter, Beauties Anna and Tai, and lone Brawn Scot; Julia was exiled. On both tribes, the Brains and Brawn planned to eliminate a Beauty due to Beauty Julia joining the losing tribe. At Gondol, Scot and Tai bonded, as did Cydney and Debbie on Chan Loh.: Immunity challenge: Two members per tribe swam out and retrieved a net with fish-shaped puzzle pieces. Two more members untied the pieces and put them on hooks attached to a beam, then brought the beam to the last two members, who used the pieces to solve a puzzle. The first tribe to solve their puzzle won immunity.; Chan Loh won immunity. Back at the Gondol camp, Aubry, Joe and Peter continued their plan to eliminate a Beauty, while Tai and Anna recruited Scot to get rid of Peter for his arrogance; Tai revealed his idol to Anna and Scot, and planned to use it that night to forgo the tie. However, Aubry told Scot that the target was Anna, and Scot—knowing that both Jason and Tai had idols, and that they could be combined—tried to convince Tai not to play his idol. At Tribal Council, Tai listened to Scot, and they joined the Brains to vote Anna out.
476	6	"Play or Go Home"	Recap	2.1/8	March 23, 2016	9.31	9
After Anna's elimination, Peter considered betraying fellow former Brains Aubry and Joe, and conspired with Tai to vote Joe out next. At Chan Loh, Debbie tried to align with Nick. Before the reward challenge, Julia officially joined the Gondol tribe.: Reward challenge: One tribe-mate swam out to untie thirty buoys; they and three other tribe-mates then brought them back to shore to the final two tribe-mates, who shot them into a basket. The first tribe to get ten buoys into their basket won a picnic.; Michele lagged on untying the buoys for Chan Loh, and Gondol won the challenge. Back at camp, Michele—already distraught after her ally Anna's elimination—worried that her performance in the challenge would make her a target, but Debbie assured her that she was safe, and the two aligned against Jason. Nick told Michele not to align with Debbie, but Michele didn't appreciate Nick's patronizing attitude. At Gondol, Peter recruited Julia for his new alliance. Joe, wary of Peter's behavior, confronted him and the two argued.: Immunity challenge: After the tribes ran through an obstacle course, two members used poles to move wooden blocks across a net. The entire tribe then stacked the blocks; the first tribe to build a freestanding stack with all their blocks won immunity.; Chan Loh narrowly won immunity. Back at the Gondol camp, Aubry and Joe realized that voting Peter out would cost the former Brains their majority, and realigned with Peter to vote Julia out as to not alienate new allies Scot and Tai. However, after Peter broke the news to Scot and Tai about changing the target from Joe to Julia, they and Julia decided to target Peter instead. To avoid a tie, Julia and Tai tried convincing Aubry that Peter had been targeting her. At Tribal Council, though Aubry initially wrote down Julia's name, she crossed it out and voted for Peter instead, joining Julia, Tai and Scot in sending him out of the game.
477	7	"It's Merge Time"	Recap	2.0/7	March 30, 2016	9.16	8
Back at Gondol, Scot reprimanded Aubry and Joe for being untrustworthy: Joe for voting against Julia and Aubry for changing her vote. The next day, at Chan Loh, Cydney and Jason spotted a bulge in Neal's pocket, and assumed he had a hidden immunity idol. Later that day, the tribes merged. The four remaining Brains (Aubry, Debbie, Joe and Neal) realigned, as did the three Brawn (Cydney, Jason and Scot). Needing six votes to form a majority, both sides courted the Beauties; Tai and Julia quickly joined Scot and the Brawn alliance, while Michele and Nick entertained offers from both sides. To gain Nick's trust, Scot told him and Jason about Tai's idol. Debbie's brazen attempts to align with the Beauties alienated them, and a worried Neal revealed his idol to Aubry, as the two considered using it at the next Tribal Council.: Immunity challenge: Castaways stood on a log while balancing a ball on a wooden disc; after a certain period of time, additional balls were added. The final castaway to remain on their perch with all balls on their disc won immunity.; Nick won the challenge; back at camp, he and Michele decided to team up with the Brawn alliance, believing them to be less likely than the Brains to earn the jury's votes at the end of the game. The Brawn-Beauty alliance formulated a plan to split the votes between Aubry and Neal to flush out Neal's idol. However, before Tribal Council, Jeff and a doctor visited the camp to inspect some of the castaways' injuries. Neal was evacuated from the game after the doctor judged that an infected wound on his knee could possibly worsen and affect his joint, and Tribal Council was cancelled. Neal left the game with his hidden immunity idol, and became the first member of the jury.
478	8	"The Jocks vs. the Pretty People"	Recap	1.9/7	April 6, 2016	8.98	10
After Neal's evacuation, the three remaining Brains — Aubry, Debbie and Joe — tried to find dissent within the seven-person Brawn-Beauty alliance.: Reward challenge: Divided into two teams of five, the castaways used two stepping poles to transfer one teammate from one platform to another. Then, all five teammates had to fit on a small platform together; the first team to do so won an afternoon of ice cream at camp.; Debbie, Julia, Nick, Scot and Tai handily won. Jason and Scot later worried about a women's alliance, and decided to split their alliance's votes between Aubry or Debbie, with Debbie going home. Nick consulted with Julia to ensure there was no women's alliance but Cydney overheard, and ratted him out to Jason and Scot. Though Cydney and Jason tried to talk it over, Cydney felt untrusted.: Immunity challenge: Castaways balanced on a narrow perch while holding a handle. If a castaway removed a hand or a foot, they were eliminated; the last castaway remaining won immunity.; Five minutes in, host Jeff Probst offered food to anyone willing to drop out of the challenge; Jason, Joe, Michele and Scot took the offer. Nick publicly admitted that he felt safe and that a Brain would be going home that night, and dropped out immediately once all the Brains had been eliminated. Tai defeated Cydney to win immunity. Back at camp, Nick told Aubry to vote against Debbie, but Cydney decided to rally the women against Nick. However, the Beauty girls, Michele and Julia, debated between remaining with the Beauty-Brawn alliance or joining the other women. At Tribal Council, Tai accidentally revealed that two idols could be combined to form a super idol, which increased suspicion on the Brawn-Beauty men. Tai then deviated from the plan and voted against Jason, while the five women and Joe united to send Nick to the jury.
479	9	"It's Psychological Warfare"	Recap	1.9/7	April 13, 2016	8.39	7
Back at camp, the minority alliance of Jason, Scot and Tai regrouped, and Jason and Tai officially revealed their idols to each other. As revenge for Nick's blindside, Jason and Scot hid the tribe's axe and machete and extinguished the fire; Tai was uncomfortable with the sabotage, and the other tribe-mates were able to recover.: Reward challenge: Divided into two teams of four, each team were tied together to a rope; after unspooling themselves, they unclipped themselves from the rope and threw sandbags at a series of blocks. The first team to knock all their blocks off the ledge earned a Chinese food lunch.; The tribe took Jeff's offer to choose their own teams. Julia chose to join the minority alliance's team, while Joe opted to sit out; he predicted that Aubry, Cydney, Debbie and Michele would win, and would enjoy the reward with the winners if he was correct. Jason, Julia, Tai and Scot won the challenge. Julia's choice made the other girls suspicious of her; during the reward feast, Julia admitted that she wanted to work with the men, believing she had a better chance to defeat them at the end of the game. Though Debbie thought Julia was loyal, Aubry and Cydney disagreed, and considered voting Julia out. Aubry told Debbie that voting Julia out would circumvent the idols, but Debbie refused to target Julia. Tai decided to join his alliance in sabotaging the tribe, and doused the fire.: Immunity challenge: The castaways placed blocks in a line while avoiding ropes that would topple the tiles that were already placed. Once all of the blocks were properly stacked, the castaway would start a domino effect that would drop the last tile on a platform at the other end. The first castaway to do so won immunity.; Julia won the challenge, thwarting Aubry and Cydney's plan. Debbie told all the women, including Julia, to split the votes between Scot and Tai, with Scot as the main target. Julia then told Scot the plan, and he told her to vote against Cydney. Perturbed by Debbie's volatility, Aubry and Cydney decided to target her, and tried to recruit Joe and Michele; Michele agreed, but Joe did not. Needing one more vote, the women then tried to recruit Julia instead. At Tribal Council, Jason and Tai revealed their idols, and Jason said that he and Scot would play rock-paper-scissors to determine who between the two would play it that night. Scot won rock-paper-scissors, but he and Jason gave it to Tai instead, who didn't play either idol. Ultimately, Julia joined Aubry, Cydney, and Michele in voting Debbie out.
480	10	"I'm Not Here to Make Good Friends"	Recap	2.0/7	April 20, 2016	9.27	4
After Tribal Council, Tai returned Jason's idol. The next day, the minority alliance of Jason, Scot and Tai stopped sabotaging the camp in order to gain allies; Scot apologized to Aubry, and tried to recruit her to eliminate Cydney for dismantling the Brawn-Beauty alliance, but she was noticeably hesitant.: Reward challenge: Contestants used one leg to balance a stack of pots on a teeter-totter, competing only against those vying for the same reward of three choices: a letter from home; a hamburger, fries, cookies and beer; or an advantage in the game.; Julia beat Joe to win a letter from home and Michele outlasted Scot and Jason for the meal. Tai defeated Cydney and Aubry for the advantage: an extra vote at any Tribal Council of his choice up until the final five. Playing both sides, Julia proposed to Aubry and Michele that they vote against Tai to flush out his idol. Aubry, suspicious of Julia, asked Tai to join forces instead, but when Tai revealed this to his allies, they changed their target to Aubry; Tai felt alienated from his alliance and reconsidered his loyalties.: Immunity challenge: The castaways held weighted discs against structures to either side of them using only their fingertips. The last castaway remaining won immunity.; Jason defeated Aubry to win immunity; back at camp, he gave Scot his hidden immunity idol, and they and Tai planned to form the super idol that night. Julia told Scot and Jason about the plan to flush Tai's idol, and the three planned to betray Tai later on as they felt he was unbeatable with the jury. However, Aubry — wanting to work with Tai and not Julia — recruited Cydney and Joe to switch the target to Scot instead; needing one more vote, she propositioned Tai, who weighed both options. At Tribal Council, Tai voted against Scot; Scot received the most votes and was eliminated after Tai refused to form the super idol, joining the jury with Jason's idol in his pocket.
481	11	"It’s a ‘Me’ Game, Not a ‘We’ Game"	Recap	2.1/8	April 27, 2016	9.47	3
After eliminating Scot and taking out Jason's idol, the new majority alliance of Aubry, Cydney, Joe and Tai celebrated their victory, with Jason as their next target, while a confused Julia and Michele lamented being left out of the plan. The next day, Tai tried to rationalize his betrayal to Jason, explaining that he was afraid that he and Scot were going to betray him, but it failed to diffuse Jason's anger.: Reward challenge: Divided into pairs and tethered together at the waist, the teams raced through an obstacle course to retrieve three rings. The first pair to throw the rings onto a hook won a helicopter ride followed by a picnic.; The pairs were divided by random draw; Jason did not compete. Cydney and Michele narrowly defeated Joe and Tai, and brought Aubry with them on the reward. On the reward, Michele tried to reintegrate with her old alliance, and Aubry and Cydney discussed teaming up with Michele to eliminate Tai for being too likable and powerful, but only once Jason and Julia were gone. At camp, Jason and Julia plotted to recruit Cydney and Michele to eliminate Tai at the next Tribal Council.: Immunity challenge: The castaways raced out to a platform that featured a series of symbols with corresponding numbers. They then raced back to their stations and used the numbers that corresponded with the symbols provided to select one of eight keys; the correct key would unlock a series of puzzle pieces with letters on them. The first castaway to spell the correct word won immunity.; Michele beat Julia to win immunity. Back at camp, the majority alliance — Michele included — chose to target Julia over Jason for her challenge and social prowess, but Cydney and Michele later debated between voting against Julia or Tai. At Tribal Council, a nervous Tai considered playing his idol; ultimately, Tai kept it, and Cydney and Michele voted against Julia, sending her to the jury.
482	12	"Now’s the Time to Start Scheming"	Recap	2.1/8	May 4, 2016	9.48	4
After Julia's elimination, Tai revealed his advantage to Aubry and Joe, while sole outsider Jason urged Cydney and Michele to think about taking him to the end over Aubry or Tai. Michele hoped that, by voting out her closest ally in Julia, she had gained trust within her alliance, but Tai considered blindsiding Michele for her likability.: Reward challenge: Separated into groups of three, castaways raced one by one through a water obstacle course to reach a large, floating table maze. Once all members of the team were present, the castaways untied a ball and, using only themselves as balance points, manoeuvred it into the centre of the maze. First team to lodge all three balls won a picnic and a trip to a local sanctuary to visit rescued animals.; Jason, Michele and Tai won the challenge. On the trip, Jason's positive attitude strengthened Tai's resolve to eliminate Michele. At camp, Joe's bossy demeanour irritated Cydney.: Immunity challenge: The castaways held a rope attached to an unbalanced table to keep the table level, while maneuvering between two platforms retrieving and stacking blocks with letters on them; if their stack dropped, they had to restart. The first castaway to stack all eight blocks in correct order, spelling "IMMUNITY", won the challenge.; Cydney won the challenge. Back at camp, Tai reinforced his desire to vote Michele out; though Aubry agreed, Cydney didn't appreciate Tai's brusque attitude, and she revealed his scheme to Michele. At Tribal Council, Tai claimed Michele was at the bottom of their alliance; he used his extra vote advantage to vote against Michele twice, but the rest of his alliance abandoned his plan and sent Jason to the jury.
483	13	"With Me or Not With Me"	Recap	2.1/8	May 11, 2016	9.51	3
After Jason's elimination, Tai tried to make amends with his alliance after he was left out of the plan, and confronted Aubry about her betrayal.: Reward challenge: Castaways raced to a wooden ladder in the jungle to retrieve sandbags, and then raced back to a series of targets. They then launched the sandbags into the targets; once a castaway ran out of sandbags, they had to wait until all others ran out before retrieving them. The first castaway to launch a sandbag into each of their five targets won an overnight trip to a spa, where they enjoyed a feast.; After everyone else ran out of sandbags, Joe took his time and won the challenge with his final toss. He chose Aubry to join him on the trip; when given the chance to bring another castaway, Joe deferred to Aubry, who picked Cydney. On the trip, Joe proposed a final three alliance, and claimed that Aubry would automatically win against him and Cydney; Aubry privately realized that Cydney was a bigger threat to win than Tai, and considered betraying her. Back at camp, Michele and Tai attempted to reconnect, and the two decided to team up against Aubry. However, after returning to camp the next morning, Aubry reconciled with Tai, and the two decided to go to the end with Joe, while Cydney and Michele teamed up against Aubry and Joe. Joe began feeling ill as a result of the previous day's feasting; after his condition kept worsening, the medical team withdrew him from the game.
484	14	"Not Going Down Without a Fight"	Recap	2.1/7	May 18, 2016	9.54	5
Having lost Joe and, as a result, their majority alliance, Aubry and Tai decided to target Michele for her close personal relationships with the jurors, while Cydney and Michele targeted Tai.: Reward challenge: The castaways crawled through a net and slid tiles down a shuffleboard, then balanced the tiles on a machete through an obstacle course; once all the tiles were through, the castaway used them to solve a combination lock. The winning castaway won a protein-rich meal.; Aubry won the challenge, and chose to share her reward with Cydney to ensure Michele lost the next immunity challenge but while they enjoyed the meal, Michele talked to Tai about breaking up Aubry and Cydney's partnership.: Immunity challenge: The castaways raced between a platform in the ocean and a tower to retrieve three keys to unlock the two higher levels of the tower and then a bag of puzzle pieces. The first castaway to solve the puzzle won immunity.; Michele came from behind to win the challenge, narrowly beating Tai. Aubry changed her target to Cydney and pled with Tai to vote with her and force a tie, while Michele and Cydney proposed getting rid of Aubry as the best likely speaker in front of the jury. At Tribal Council, Tai voted against Cydney, forcing a tie between her and Aubry. Aubry defeated Cydney in the fire-making tiebreaker to make Cydney the final member of the jury. The tree mail on Day 38 hinted at a final two, but Aubry, Michele and Tai were shocked when Jeff announced that they had made the final three and no one would be voted out that night; and that instead of immunity, the challenge would be played for the right to vote out a jury member at Tribal Council that night.: Reward challenge: The castaways balanced on an unstable beam while using a forked pole to stack balls and stands. The first castaway to stack all six balls won the power to eliminate a juror.; Michele narrowly defeated Aubry to win the challenge. She considered eliminating Joe for his unfaltering loyalty to Aubry, Neal for his loyalty to Aubry and persuasiveness, or Scot for being the victim of Tai's biggest move in the game. At Tribal Council, the jury members were surprised that no one had immunity, and received another shock when Michele revealed the juror removal twist to them. In the end, Michele chose to remove Neal from the jury. The next night, at the final Tribal Council, Tai was criticized for his erratic gameplay and misplaying his advantages, Aubry was praised for her transformation throughout the game, and Michele was reprimanded for coasting through the beginning of the game but was praised for working her way back into the majority after being left out of Scot's elimination. At the end of the final Tribal Council, Tai finally let Mark the Chicken go after taking care of it throughout the season, hoping it will not get eaten up by someone.
485	15	"Reunion"	N/A	1.5/5	May 18, 2016	6.42	18
A year later, at the live reunion, Michele was awarded the title of Sole Survivor with Debbie, Scot, Julia, Jason, and Cydney's votes, Aubry placed second with votes from Nick and Joe, and Tai placed third after receiving no votes to win. After the reveal of the final vote, the castaways discussed the season with host Jeff Probst. During Tai's discussion about his kindness to animals especially the relationship with Mark the Chicken, Sia made a surprise appearance and announced that she is donating $50,000 to Tai and another $50,000 to the charity of his choice.

== Voting history ==
	Original tribes							Switched tribes		Merged tribe									
Episode	1		2	3		4		5	6	7	8	9	10	11	12		13	14	
Day	3		6	8		9	11	13	16	19	22	24	27	29	32		34	37	
Tribe	To Tang		To Tang	Chan Loh		Gondol	To Tang	Gondol	Gondol	Dara	Dara	Dara	Dara	Dara	Dara		Dara	Dara	
Eliminated	Tie (Note: The vote resulted in a tie. Per the rules, a second vote was held where the castaways involved in the tie would not vote and the remaining castaways could only vote for those who tied.)	Darnell	Jennifer	Tie	Liz	Caleb	Alecia	Anna	Peter	Neal	Nick	Debbie	Scot	Julia	Jason		Joe	Tie (Note: The vote resulted in a tie. The non-tied castaways were invited to re-vote between the tied castaways, but they elected to stand by their initial vote, thus forcing a deadlocked tie. As there were only four castaways remaining, the two tied castaways competed in a fire making duel to resolve the tie.)	Cydney
Votes	3–3	4–0	3–2	2–2–2	3–0–0	Evacuated (Note: No vote; Caleb was medically evacuated from the game.)	3–1	5–1	4–2	Evacuated (Note: No vote; Neal was medically evacuated from the game.)	6–2–1–1	4–3–2	4–2–2	5–2	4–2–1		Evacuated (Note: No vote; Joe was medically evacuated from the game.)	2–2	Challenge (Note: Cydney lost to Aubry in the fire-making tiebreaker.)
Voter	Vote																		
Michele											Nick	Debbie	Tai	Julia	Jason			Aubry	
Aubry				Peter	None (Note: This player was not eligible to vote in the second round of voting.)			Anna	Peter		Nick	Debbie	Scot	Julia	Jason			Cydney	Won
Tai								Anna	Peter		Jason	Cydney	Scot	Julia	Michele	Michele (Note: This player played an extra vote advantage, allowing them to cast two ballots during a single vote.)		Cydney	
Cydney	Alecia	Darnell	Jennifer				Alecia				Nick	Debbie	Scot	Julia	Jason			Aubry	Lost
Joe				Liz	Liz			Anna	Julia		Nick	Scot	Scot	Julia	Jason		Evacuated		
Jason	Alecia	Darnell	Jennifer				Alecia				Aubry	Cydney	Aubry	Tai	Joe				
Julia								Exiled (Note: Julia was exiled after drawing the sole To Tang buff during the tribe swap. She joined the tribe that lost the next Immunity Challenge, Gondol, the day after their Tribal Council.)	Peter		Nick	Debbie	Tai	Tai					
Scot	Darnell	Darnell	Alecia				Alecia	Anna	Peter		Aubry	Cydney	Aubry						
Debbie				Liz	Liz						Nick	Scot							
Nick											Debbie								
Neal				Peter	Liz					Evacuated									
Peter				Aubry	None			Anna	Julia										
Anna								Peter											
Alecia	Darnell	None	Jennifer				Scot												
Caleb						Evacuated													
Liz				Aubry	None														
Jennifer	Darnell	Darnell	Alecia																
Darnell	Alecia	None																	

Jury vote
Episode	15		
Day	39		
Finalist	Michele	Aubry	Tai
Votes	5–2–0		
Juror	Vote		
Cydney	Yes		
Joe		Yes	
Jason	Yes		
Julia	Yes		
Scot	Yes		
Debbie	Yes		
Nick		Yes	
Neal	None (Note: On Day 38, Michele won an advantage that allowed her to vote out one member of the jury. That member would immediately be sequestered from the jury and would not attend the final tribal council nor cast a vote for the winner. Michele chose Neal.)		

== Reception ==
=== Critical reception ===
Overall, the season received a positive response from critics and commentators, who praised its unpredictability and strong players including Fitzgerald, Bracco, Gillon, and Trang. The members of the jury, the lackluster final tribal council, and the final twist that gave one of the finalists the right to vote out a jury member (which resulted in Gottileb's removal), however, were received poorly by many.

Daniel Fienberg of The Hollywood Reporter praised the season's unpredictability but panned the final Tribal Council, saying "this was one of the rare seasons that came into its last leg with no inherently 'wrong' winner;" but was critical of the jury members for providing a very dull final tribal council. He praised Fitzgerald for her alliance management and for winning challenges at crucial points in the game and was of the opinion that the last two challenge wins, which provided "nice [moments] of release and catharsis", were what won her the title in the end. Fienberg, however, criticized the jury, Pollard and Jason in particular, for not voting for Bracco, who he thought had been a stronger strategic player and the undue attention given to Tai during the reunion show; he went on to call the whole two hours "awful".

Andy Dehnart of Reality Blurred echoed Fienberg's sentiment, stating that it "ended up being a strong season overall, with some exceptionally dramatic moments and interesting game play throughout" but the finale was a "disappointing three hours." He was especially critical of jury members Pollard, Jason, and Maiorano, the editing of the final episode, Probst's undue discussion on non-game related things, and lack of attention on players including Bracco and Gillon during the final episode and the reunion show respectively.

Dalton Ross of Entertainment Weekly ranked this season 25th out of 40 praising this season's unpredictability but stated that there "were not enough transcendent players in the cast." In 2020, "Purple Rock Podcast" ranked this season 19th out of 40 saying that the "cast is fairly good, with several memorable players. Despite a few unfortunate setbacks that throw off the gameplay, it’s an enjoyable season." Later that same year, Inside Survivor ranked this season 14th out of 40 calling it underrated and an "incredibly entertaining, character-rich, and, at times, surprising season."

In 2021, Rob Has a Podcast ranked Kaôh Rōng 17th during their Survivor All-Time Top 40 Rankings podcast.

In 2024, Nick Caruso of TVLine ranked this season 17th out of 47.

Survivor fans narrowly agreed with the final outcome, voting for Fitzgerald over Bracco by a margin of 3% in a poll conducted by Entertainment Weekly which asked who should've won every season of Survivor.

Trang also received positive attention for his treatment of animals throughout the game, most notably for domesticating a chicken named Mark, after series creator and executive producer Mark Burnett, over the course of the game. Trang's actions prompted musician Sia to make a surprise appearance at the live reunion show to donate $50,000 each to Trang and an animal charity of his choice.

=== Ratings ===
Ratings for the premiere were down considerably from both the Worlds Apart season and Cambodia season, attaining a 1.9/7 rating/share among adults 18-49; this was largely due to American Idol airing at the same time as the show and attaining a 2.0/7 rating. Including DVR playback, the premiere was watched by 10 million viewers and got a 2.6 rating in the 18-49 demographic, slightly surpassing American Idol's 9.76 million viewers and 2.5 rating.

It was often in the top ten most watched broadcast shows among adults 18–49, a trend that started with episode three. By April, the show became the No. 1 unscripted program among adults in all demographics, beating The Voice.

No. in series	No. in season	Episode	Air date	Time slot (EST)	Rating/share (18–49)	Viewers (millions)	Rank (timeslot)	Rank (night)	Rank (week)	DVR 18-49	DVR Viewers (millions)	Total 18-49	Total viewers (millions)	Ref
471	1	"I'm a Mental Giant"	February 17, 2016	Wednesdays; 8:00 p.m.	1.9/7	8.30	2	4	13	0.7	1.701	2.6	10.001	
472	2	"Kindergarten Camp"	February 24, 2016	Wednesdays; 8:00 p.m.	1.9/6	8.39	2	3	15	0.6	1.616	2.5	10.006	
473	3	"The Circle of Life"	March 2, 2016	Wednesdays; 8:00 p.m.	2.2/8	9.24	1	2	5	0.5	1.515	2.7	10.755	
474	4	"Signed, Sealed and Delivered"	March 9, 2016	Wednesdays; 8:00 p.m.	2.1/8	9.26	1	1	7	0.8	2.030	2.9	11.303	
475	5	"The Devils We Know"	March 16, 2016	Wednesdays; 8:00 p.m.	2.1/8	9.50	1	2	7	0.8	1.593	2.9	11.093	
476	6	"Play or Go Home"	March 23, 2016	Wednesdays; 8:00 p.m.	2.1/8	9.31	1	3	9	0.5	1.560	2.6	10.870	
477	7	"It's Merge Time"	March 30, 2016	Wednesdays; 8:00 p.m.	2.0/7	9.16	1	2	8	0.7	1.535	2.7	10.696	
478	8	"The Jocks vs. the Pretty People"	April 6, 2016	Wednesdays; 8:00 p.m.	1.9/7	8.98	2	4	10	0.8	2.078	2.7	11.061	
479	9	"It's Psychological Warfare"	April 13, 2016	Wednesdays; 8:00 p.m.	1.9/7	8.39	1	3	7	0.7	2.032	2.6	10.426	
480	10	"I'm Not Here to Make Good Friends"	April 20, 2016	Wednesdays; 8:00 p.m.	2.0/7	9.27	1	2	4	0.7	1.494	2.7	10.764	
481	11	"It’s a ‘Me’ Game, Not a ‘We’ Game"	April 27, 2016	Wednesdays; 8:00 p.m.	2.1/8	9.47	1	2	3	0.7	1.540	2.8	11.010	
482	12	"Now’s the Time to Start Scheming"	May 4, 2016	Wednesdays; 8:00 p.m.	2.1/8	9.48	1	3	4	0.7	1.517	2.8	10.997	
483	13	"With Me or Not With Me"	May 11, 2016	Wednesdays; 8:00 p.m.	2.1/8	9.51	1	2	3	0.7	1.520	2.8	11.032	
484	14	"Not Going Down Without a Fight"	May 18, 2016	Wednesdays; 8:00 p.m.	2.1/7	9.54	1	2	5	0.6	1.588	2.7	11.130	
485	15	"Reunion"	May 18, 2016	Wednesday; 10:00 p.m.	1.5/5	6.42	1	3	18	0.5	1.654	2.0	8.075	

=== Canadian ratings ===
No. in series	No. in season	Episode	Air date	Time slot (EST)	Viewers (millions)	Rank (week)	Ref
469	1	"I'm a Mental Giant"	February 17, 2016	Wednesdays; 8:00 p.m.	2.15	5	
470	2	"Kindergarten Camp"	February 24, 2016	Wednesdays; 8:00 p.m.	2.19	7	
471	3	"The Circle of Life"	March 2, 2016	Wednesdays; 8:00 p.m.	2.18	3	
472	4	"Signed, Sealed and Delivered"	March 9, 2016	Wednesdays; 8:00 p.m.	2.42	2	
473	5	"The Devils We Know"	March 16, 2016	Wednesdays; 8:00 p.m.	2.00	5	
474	6	"Play or Go Home"	March 23, 2016	Wednesdays; 8:00 p.m.	2.03	5	
475	7	"It's Merge Time"	March 30, 2016	Wednesdays; 8:00 p.m.	2.20	3	
476	8	"The Jocks vs. the Pretty People"	April 6, 2016	Wednesdays; 8:00 p.m.	TBD	TBD	TBD
