= Scot Pollard =

American basketball player (born 1975)

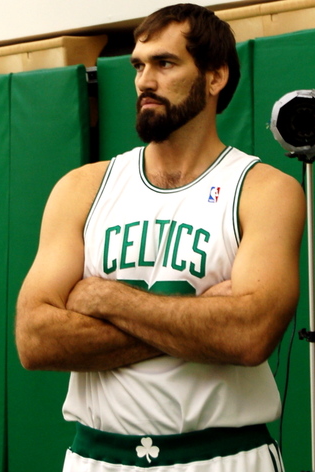
- Pollard with the Boston Celtics in 2007

Personal information
- Born: February 12, 1975 (age 51) Murray, Utah, U.S.
- Listed height: 6 ft 11 in (2.11 m)
- Listed weight: 278 lb (126 kg)

Career information
- High school: Torrey Pines (San Diego, California); Kamiakin (Kennewick, Washington)
- College: Kansas (1993–1997)
- NBA draft: 1997: 1st round, 19th overall pick
- Drafted by: Detroit Pistons
- Playing career: 1997–2008
- Position: Center / power forward
- Number: 31, 62, 66

Career history
- 1997–1998: Detroit Pistons
- 1999–2003: Sacramento Kings
- 2003–2006: Indiana Pacers
- 2006–2007: Cleveland Cavaliers
- 2007–2008: Boston Celtics

Career highlights
- NBA champion (2008); Second-team All-Big Eight (1996); Third-team Parade All-American (1993)

Career statistics
- Points: 2,222 (4.4 ppg)
- Rebounds: 2,351 (4.6 rpg)
- Assists: 220 (0.4 apg)
- Stats at NBA.com
- Stats at Basketball Reference

Scot L. Pollard (born February 12, 1975) is an American former professional basketball player. In an 11-year National Basketball Association (NBA) career, he played for five teams, spending the bulk of his career with the Sacramento Kings and the Indiana Pacers.

Pollard was born in Murray, Utah, and grew up in San Diego and Kennewick, Washington. He attended the University of Kansas and was the 19th pick of the 1997 NBA draft, selected by the Detroit Pistons. For every season, except his first, Pollard appeared in the NBA Playoffs including in the 2007 NBA Finals with the Cleveland Cavaliers. He won a championship in his final season (2007–08) with the Boston Celtics.

Pollard appeared as a contestant in Survivor: Kaôh Rōng in 2016.

== Early life and college ==
Pollard was one of six children in a devout Latter-Day Saint family, but Pollard never embraced the religion. His father, Pearl Pollard, played basketball at the University of Utah. For three years, he played high school basketball at Torrey Pines High School in San Diego before moving to Kennewick, Washington to play for Kamiakin High School most of his senior year. Parade magazine named Pollard a high school All-American in 1993. He eventually graduated from Torrey Pines and attended the University of Kansas, where he graduated in 1997 with a degree in education. While playing NCAA basketball, Pollard finished sixth in Jayhawks history among free throw shooters with 358, fourth in rebounds with 850, and second in blocked shots with 218.

== NBA career ==
Pollard was selected 19th overall in the 1997 NBA draft by the Detroit Pistons, with whom he debuted during the 1997-98 NBA season. In 33 games with the Pistons, he averaged 2.7 points, 2.2 rebounds, and 0.3 assists per game.

He was traded to the Atlanta Hawks for Christian Laettner, but Pollard never suited up for a game with them and was waived almost a month later. Pollard was traded to the Sacramento Kings, whose management was in the midst of building a successful playoff team at the time. With the Kings he suffered an injury that allowed him to play only for sixteen games during the lockout-shortened 1999 season. It was during his stint with the Kings that he became a solid backup to center Vlade Divac, often starting at power forward when Chris Webber was injured.

Pollard spent the 2002–03 NBA season plagued by injuries. After that season, he was traded to the Indiana Pacers. With the Pacers Pollard had an average of 3.4 rebounds, 3.2 points scored, and 0.4 assists per game. He played an average of about 12 minutes per game.

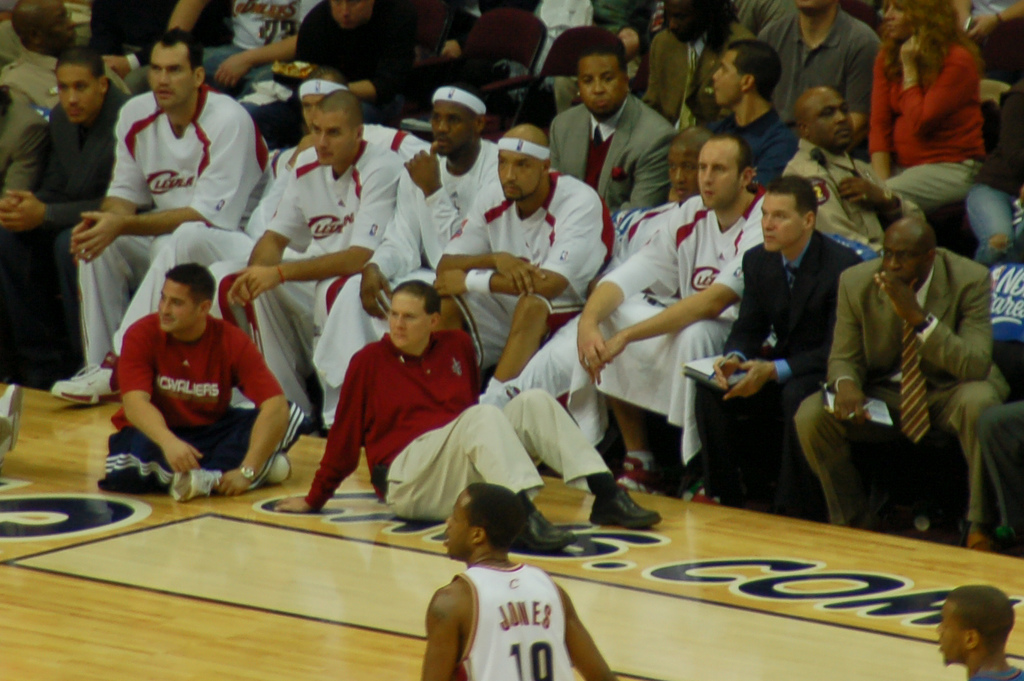
Pollard (farthest left in white jacket) played for the Cleveland Cavaliers during the 2006–2007 season.

Pollard's contract with the Pacers expired following the 2005–06 season. On August 18, 2006, Pollard signed a one-year contract with the Cleveland Cavaliers. The Cavaliers lost the 2007 NBA Finals to the San Antonio Spurs four games to none, and Pollard played one minute of game 2.

On August 9, 2007, Pollard signed a one-year contract with the Boston Celtics. Pollard chose #66 as his new uniform number, and jokingly claimed he took it because he would not be allowed to have three 6's. Pollard played limited minutes during the season and saw no playing time during the Celtics championship run in the 2008 NBA Playoffs. He retired shortly after.

== Hair styles ==
Pollard was known across the NBA for his peculiar hairstyles, which included a Mohawk, a single pony tail, a man bun, and a bald head. On January 2, 2006, he introduced a new hairstyle when he wore two pony tails during a Pacers home game against the Seattle SuperSonics.

While with the Sacramento Kings, Pollard received the nickname "Samurai Scot".

== Other pursuits ==
=== Broadcasting ===
During the 2007–08 season, Pollard hosted "Planet Pollard," a segment of the show Celtics Now, on Comcast SportsNet. He visited various locales and often gave tours and information about the place he was visiting.

On April 12, 2008, during a game against the Atlanta Hawks, Pollard filled in for color commentator Tom Heinsohn on CSN New England's game telecast. Pollard, who was out for the season after left ankle surgery, has color analyst experience with the Sacramento Kings and WNBA's Sacramento Monarchs. Pollard joined NBA TV in 2009. On October 3, 2014, Mark Boyle announced that Pollard would be joining the Indiana Pacers radio crew.

=== Acting ===
In 2012, Pollard portrayed the titular Axeman in the horror film Axeman at Cutter's Creek. In 2014, he played the role of B. H. Born in the film Jayhawkers.

=== Survivor ===
In 2016, Pollard appeared as a contestant on Survivor: Kaôh Rōng, competing in the 32nd season of the competitive reality television series Survivor as part of the To Tang, Gondol, and Dara tribes. The competition was filmed in Kaoh Rong, Cambodia during the spring of 2015 and premiered on February 17, 2016. Though Kaôh Rōng was the 32nd season to air, it was the 31st filmed, having been shot before Survivor: Cambodia, which aired first; the two seasons were filmed back-to-back in the same location. He was voted out on Day 27 by a 4–2–2 vote and became the fourth member of the jury.

== Health ==
In January 2024, Pollard revealed that he needed a heart transplant due to a genetic issue that was triggered by a virus he contracted in 2021. He was admitted to the ICU in February 2024 while waiting for the transplant. On February 16, 2024, Pollard underwent successful heart transplant surgery. Five months later, he sent a letter to the donor's family expressing his gratitude and offering to meet them. In March 2025, over a year after the surgery, Pollard met the donor's wife, son, and sister in person, allowing them to listen to their loved one's heartbeat and thanking them for the gift of life.

== NBA career statistics ==
Legend
GP	Games played	GS	Games started	MPG	Minutes per game
FG%	Field goal percentage	3P%	3-point field goal percentage	FT%	Free throw percentage
RPG	Rebounds per game	APG	Assists per game	SPG	Steals per game
BPG	Blocks per game	PPG	Points per game	**Bold**	Career high
†	Won an NBA championship

=== Regular season ===
Year	Team	GP	GS	MPG	FG%	3P%	FT%	RPG	APG	SPG	BPG	PPG
1997–98	Detroit	33	0	9.6	.500	—	**.826**	2.2	.3	.2	.3	2.7
1998–99	Sacramento	16	5	16.2	.541	—	.696	5.1	.3	.5	1.1	5.1
1999–00	Sacramento	76	5	17.6	.527	—	.717	5.3	.6	.7	.8	5.4
2000–01	Sacramento	77	8	21.5	.468	.000	.749	6.0	.6	.6	**1.3**	**6.5**
2001–02	Sacramento	**80**	29	**23.5**	**.550**	—	.693	**7.1**	**.7**	**.9**	1.0	6.4
2002–03	Sacramento	23	0	14.1	.460	—	.605	4.6	.3	.6	.7	4.5
2003–04	Indiana	61	3	11.1	.412	—	.571	2.7	.2	.4	.4	1.7
2004–05	Indiana	49	17	17.7	.473	—	.673	4.2	.4	.6	.5	3.9
2005–06	Indiana	45	**32**	17.1	.455	—	.763	4.8	.5	.8	.4	3.8
2006–07	Cleveland	24	0	4.5	.423	—	.500	1.3	.1	.2	.0	1.0
2007–08†	Boston	22	0	7.9	.522	—	.682	1.7	.1	.1	.3	1.8
Career		506	99	16.5	.494	.000	.709	4.6	.4	.6	.7	4.4

=== Playoffs ===
Year	Team	GP	GS	MPG	FG%	3P%	FT%	RPG	APG	SPG	BPG	PPG
1999	Sacramento	5	0	14.8	**.667**	—	.0	2.2	.2	**.8**	**1.2**	3.0
2000	Sacramento	5	0	14.0	.563	—	.333	3.2	.2	.4	.2	4.0
2001	Sacramento	8	0	**17.6**	.633	—	.588	**6.9**	**.3**	.1	.9	**6.0**
2002	Sacramento	**15**	0	12.9	.525	—	.667	3.5	.2	.5	.3	3.3
2003	Sacramento	8	0	11.4	.292	—	**.769**	3.8	**.3**	.1	.9	3.0
2004	Indiana	3	0	4.3	.000	—	.500	1.3	.0	.3	.0	.7
2005	Indiana	9	0	7.4	.400	—	.500	1.2	.1	.1	.0	1.4
2006	Indiana	4	0	3.8	.000	—	—	1.3	.0	.3	.0	.0
2007	Cleveland	3	0	1.0	—	—	—	.0	.0	.0	.0	.0
Career		60	0	11.1	.496	.000	.610	3.1	.2	.3	.4	2.9
