= Donyell Marshall =

American basketball player (born 1973)

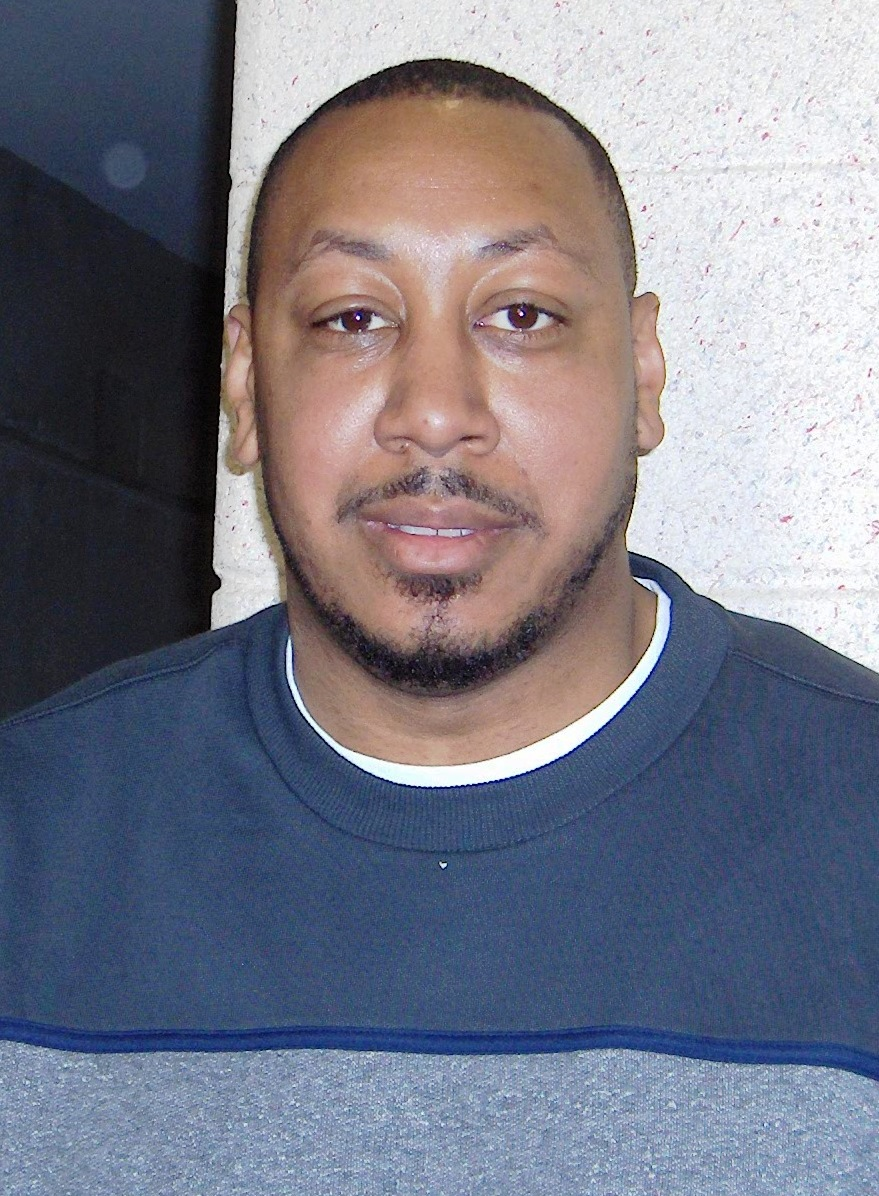
- Marshall in 2011

Personal information
- Born: May 18, 1973 (age 53) Reading, Pennsylvania, U.S.
- Listed height: 6 ft 9 in (2.06 m)
- Listed weight: 245 lb (111 kg)

Career information
- High school: Reading (Reading, Pennsylvania)
- College: UConn (1991–1994)
- NBA draft: 1994: 1st round, 4th overall pick
- Drafted by: Minnesota Timberwolves
- Playing career: 1994–2009
- Position: Power forward / small forward
- Number: 42, 3, 24, 8
- Coaching career: 2010–present

Career history

Playing
- 1994–1995: Minnesota Timberwolves
- 1995–2000: Golden State Warriors
- 2000–2002: Utah Jazz
- 2002–2003: Chicago Bulls
- 2003–2005: Toronto Raptors
- 2005–2008: Cleveland Cavaliers
- 2008: Seattle SuperSonics
- 2008–2009: Philadelphia 76ers

Career highlights
- NBA All-Rookie Second Team (1995); Consensus first-team All-American (1994); Big East Player of the Year (1994); 2× First-team All-Big East (1993, 1994); Big East Defensive Player of the Year (1994); Fourth-team Parade All-American (1991); McDonald's All-American (1991); As assistant coach: MAC tournament champion (2016)

Career NBA statistics
- Points: 10,716 (11.2 ppg)
- Rebounds: 6,376 (6.7 rpg)
- Assists: 1,305 (1.4 apg)
- Stats at NBA.com
- Stats at Basketball Reference

Donyell Lamar Marshall (born May 18, 1973) is an American basketball coach and former professional player. Drafted with the fourth pick in the 1994 NBA draft, he played for eight different teams during his National Basketball Association (NBA) career which lasted until 2009. In 2005, he hit a then-record 12 three-pointers in a single game.

== Early career ==
Marshall was born on May 18, 1973, in Reading, Pennsylvania. He graduated from Reading High School.

He attended the University of Connecticut and was a player in the university's basketball program. Marshall was a unanimous pick as Big East Player of the Year in 1993–94.

== Professional career ==
Marshall left college early to participate in the 1994 NBA draft. He was selected after his junior year at the University of Connecticut by the Minnesota Timberwolves, as the fourth overall pick. He was traded 40 games into his rookie season to the Golden State Warriors in exchange for power forward Tom Gugliotta on February 18, 1995.

Marshall played with the Warriors until 2000, when he was traded to the Utah Jazz as part of a four-team deal in which the Warriors acquired Adam Keefe and Danny Fortson. He played alongside future Hall of Fame nominees Karl Malone and John Stockton as a role player with the Jazz.

Marshall signed as a free agent with the Chicago Bulls on August 16, 2002, where he played with Jalen Rose, Kendall Gill, Jay Williams, Eddy Curry and Tyson Chandler.

On December 1, 2003, Marshall was traded to the Toronto Raptors along with Rose and Lonny Baxter for Antonio Davis, Jerome Williams and Chris Jefferies. In a March 13, 2005, game against the Philadelphia 76ers, he tied Kobe Bryant's NBA record for three-point field goals made in one game, by making 12 of 19 attempts.

In June 2005, Marshall signed a four-year contract with the Cleveland Cavaliers, who were trying to build a veteran core around LeBron James. In May 2007, he helped the team to a victory over the New Jersey Nets in Game 6 of the Eastern Conference semifinals by making six three-pointers. The victory propelled the Cavaliers to the NBA Eastern Conference finals against the Detroit Pistons, and eventually the NBA Finals against the San Antonio Spurs.

On February 21, 2008, Marshall was traded to the Seattle SuperSonics in an 11-player deal that involved three organizations. In Seattle, Marshall served as a veteran presence to a team that was building around rookie forward Kevin Durant. After the SuperSonics moved to Oklahoma City, the team waived him before the start of the new season.

On September 1, 2008, Marshall agreed to terms with the Philadelphia 76ers on a one-year contract. The move signaled Marshall's impending retirement, as he said his goal was to play for his hometown 76ers before he retired. Playing just 25 games, he provided Philadelphia with veteran leadership and three point shooting. He played a key role in Philadelphia's game 1 victory over the Orlando Magic in the first round of the playoffs; he scored 11 points and made a three-pointer to tie the game in the final minute.

== Coaching career ==
On October 26, 2009, after retiring from the NBA, Marshall joined Comcast SportsNet as a 76ers' post-game live analyst. Marshall left broadcasting on July 1, 2010, to become an assistant men's basketball coach of the George Washington Colonials under fellow Univ. of Connecticut alumnus Karl Hobbs.

On November 3, 2011, Marshall was announced as an assistant coach of the D-League's Maine Red Claws.

In September 2013, Marshall became an assistant coach of the Rider University men's basketball team. Marshall was largely responsible for the effective play of senior transfer center Matt Lopez and a second place regular season finish in the MAAC in 2014–15.

Following a 21–12 season at Rider which earned a College Basketball Invitational appearance, Marshall was named as an assistant on Nate Oats's staff at the University at Buffalo on April 16, 2015.

=== Central Connecticut ===
On April 6, 2016, he was named head men's basketball coach at Central Connecticut State. Marshall won his first game as head coach of Central Connecticut on November 11, 2016, a 75–60 win over Hartford. After the 2021 season, Marshall and Central Connecticut mutually agreed to part ways ending Marshall's time at the school after five seasons.

=== Greensboro Swarm ===
On October 24, 2021, Marshall became an assistant coach for the Greensboro Swarm of the NBA G League.

== Rankings and milestones ==
On February 5, 2007, Marshall's number was honored at Gampel Pavilion on the University of Connecticut campus in Storrs, during halftime of the men's basketball game against the Syracuse Orangemen, as part of the Huskies of Honor ceremony which recognized personal accomplishments of 13 former players and three coaches.

Until November 7, 2016, he held and shared the NBA record (with Kobe Bryant and Stephen Curry) for most three-point field goals made in a game after he made 12 three-point field goals of 19 attempts against the Philadelphia 76ers on March 13, 2005.

== Personal ==
Marshall's great uncle is Hall of Fame American football player Lenny Moore.

== NBA career statistics ==
Legend
GP	Games played	GS	Games started	MPG	Minutes per game
FG%	Field goal percentage	3P%	3-point field goal percentage	FT%	Free throw percentage
RPG	Rebounds per game	APG	Assists per game	SPG	Steals per game
BPG	Blocks per game	PPG	Points per game	**Bold**	Career high

=== Regular season ===
Year	Team	GP	GS	MPG	FG%	3P%	FT%	RPG	APG	SPG	BPG	PPG
1994–95	Minnesota	40	8	25.9	.374	.302	.680	4.9	1.4	.6	1.3	10.8
1994–95	Golden State	32	23	32.8	.413	.270	.640	6.5	1.5	.6	1.2	14.8
1995–96	Golden State	62	6	15.1	.398	.298	.771	3.4	.8	.4	.5	5.5
1996–97	Golden State	61	20	16.8	.413	.315	.622	4.5	.9	.4	.8	7.3
1997–98	Golden State	73	**73**	35.8	.414	.313	.731	8.6	2.2	**1.3**	1.0	15.4
1998–99	Golden State	48	20	26.0	.421	.361	.727	7.1	1.4	1.0	.8	11.0
1999–00	Golden State	64	51	32.4	.394	.355	.780	10.0	**2.6**	1.1	1.1	14.2
2000–01	Utah	**81**	49	28.7	.503	.320	.751	7.0	1.6	1.0	1.0	13.6
2001–02	Utah	58	42	30.2	**.519**	.310	.708	7.6	1.7	.9	1.2	14.8
2002–03	Chicago	78	53	30.5	.459	.379	.756	9.0	1.8	1.2	1.1	13.4
2003–04	Chicago	16	8	25.5	.419	.407	.700	6.2	1.8	.8	1.3	8.7
2003–04	Toronto	66	66	**39.1**	.467	.403	.741	**10.7**	1.4	1.2	**1.6**	**16.2**
2004–05	Toronto	65	2	25.3	.443	.416	.791	6.6	1.2	.9	.7	11.5
2005–06	Cleveland	**81**	0	25.6	.395	.324	.748	6.1	.7	.7	.5	9.3
2006–07	Cleveland	**81**	0	16.8	.424	.351	.663	4.0	.6	.5	.5	7.0
2007–08	Cleveland	11	1	14.2	.295	.348	.778	2.7	.5	.2	.8	3.7
2007–08	Seattle	15	0	12.3	.352	.233	**.923**	3.1	.3	.3	.5	3.8
2008–09	Philadelphia	25	0	7.6	.452	**.455**	.500	1.6	.6	.2	.2	3.8
Career		957	422	26.2	.435	.350	.731	6.7	1.4	.8	.9	11.2

=== Playoffs ===
Year	Team	GP	GS	MPG	FG%	3P%	FT%	RPG	APG	SPG	BPG	PPG
2001	Utah	5	**5**	**32.0**	.407	.125	.778	7.6	1.6	.4	1.0	10.4
2002	Utah	4	0	31.0	.420	**.500**	.750	**7.8**	**2.8**	**.8**	**1.5**	**14.3**
2006	Cleveland	13	0	26.5	**.433**	.391	**.882**	5.6	.6	.5	.7	9.5
2007	Cleveland	**19**	0	10.7	.333	.311	.636	2.2	.3	.2	.2	3.5
2009	Philadelphia	6	0	8.3	.375	.364	.000	1.2	.0	.2	.2	2.7
Career		47	5	18.8	.399	.345	.774	4.0	.7	.3	.5	6.7

== Head coaching record ==
Record table
Season	Team	Overall	Conference	Standing	Postseason
Central Connecticut Blue Devils (Northeast Conference) (2016–2021)
2016–17	Central Connecticut	6–23	4–14	9th	
2017–18	Central Connecticut	14–18	7–11	8th	
2018–19	Central Connecticut	11–20	5–13	10th	
2019–20	Central Connecticut	4–27	3–15	11th	
2020–21	Central Connecticut	5–16	5–13	T–9th	
Central Connecticut:		40–104 (.278)	24–66 (.267)		
Total:		40–104 (.278)			
National champion Postseason invitational champion Conference regular season champion Conference regular season and conference tournament champion Division regular season champion Division regular season and conference tournament champion Conference tournament champion

== See also ==
- List of NBA single-game 3-point field goal leaders
