= 2006–07 Chicago Bulls season =

NBA professional basketball team season

- Head coach: Scott Skiles
- General manager: John Paxson
- Owner: Jerry Reinsdorf
- Arena: United Center

Results
- Record: 49–33 (.598)
- Place: Division: 3rd (Central); Conference: 5th (Eastern)
- Playoff finish: Conference Semifinals (lost to Pistons 2–4)
- Stats at Basketball Reference

Local media
- Television: CSN Chicago; WGN; WCIU
- Radio: WCKG

The 2006–07 Chicago Bulls season was the 41st season for the franchise in the National Basketball Association (NBA). The team finished with a record of 49–33 in the regular season and reached the second round of the NBA playoffs, making it, at the time, their most successful season since the retirement of Michael Jordan, but nevertheless leaving some doubt amongst fans as to whether the team could compete for an NBA championship in the near future. The Bulls had the best team defensive rating in the NBA.

In the playoffs, the Bulls swept the defending NBA champion Miami Heat in four games in the First Round, before losing to the Detroit Pistons in six games in the Semifinals.

== Offseason ==
Whereas previous seasons under General Manager John Paxson focused mostly on allowing the young players which comprised the core of the Bulls' roster to develop, before the '06-'07 season Paxson made an expensive free-agent signing in the form of Ben Wallace. Many fans were excited about the veteran experience and star power Wallace brought to the team, though some questioned if he was the best fit for the team, as Wallace had always been known for his defense, and many believed that the Bulls' biggest problem was a lack of inside scoring.

On July 20, the Bulls traded Tyson Chandler to the New Orleans Hornets for J.R. Smith. However, six days later, Smith was traded again, this time to the Denver Nuggets, in exchange for Howard Eisley and two second-round draft picks.

== NBA draft ==
Round	Pick	Player	Position	Nationality	College / Club Team
1	2	LaMarcus Aldridge (traded to Portland)	F	United States	Texas
1	16	Rodney Carney (traded to Philadelphia)	F	United States	Memphis

== Regular season ==
The Bulls got off to a rocky start, posting a record of 3–9 in their first 12 games. The criticism by some in the offseason about the signing of Ben Wallace seemed to gain some validity, as Wallace appeared to show his age and was not always able to put up big rebounding numbers as he had been known for with the Pistons. However, as they had in the 2004-05 season in which they started 0–9, the Bulls performed better as the season went on and finished 49–33. The record was good enough to receive the #5 seed among the 8 teams qualifying for the Eastern Conference Playoffs. The Bulls, however, lost their final game of the season to the New Jersey Nets which would have boosted them to a #2 seed and given them an easier path to the Eastern Conference finals.

=== Season standings ===
Central Division	W	L	PCT	GB	Home	Road	Div
y-Detroit Pistons	53	29	.646	-	26–15	27–14	9–7
x-Cleveland Cavaliers	50	32	.610	3	30–11	20–21	10–6
x-Chicago Bulls	49	33	.598	4	31–10	18–23	12–4
Indiana Pacers	35	47	.427	18	22–19	13–28	8–8
Milwaukee Bucks	28	54	.341	25	18–23	10–31	1–15

#	Eastern Conference				
#	Team	W	L	PCT	GB
1	c-Detroit Pistons	53	29	.646	–
2	x-Cleveland Cavaliers	50	32	.610	3
3	y-Toronto Raptors	47	35	.573	6
4	y-Miami Heat	44	38	.537	9
5	x-Chicago Bulls	49	33	.598	4
6	x-New Jersey Nets	41	41	.500	12
7	x-Washington Wizards	41	41	.500	12
8	x-Orlando Magic	40	42	.488	13
9	Philadelphia 76ers	35	47	.427	18
10	Indiana Pacers	35	47	.427	18
11	New York Knicks	33	49	.402	20
12	Charlotte Bobcats	33	49	.402	20
13	Atlanta Hawks	30	52	.366	23
14	Milwaukee Bucks	28	54	.341	25
15	Boston Celtics	24	58	.293	29

== Playoffs ==
2007 playoff game log
First Round: 4–0 (home: 2–0; road: 2–0)

Game	Date	Team	Score	High points	High rebounds	High assists	Location Attendance	Series
1	April 21	Miami	W 96–91	Luol Deng (33)	Ben Wallace (14)	Ben Gordon (11)	United Center; 22,183	1–0
2	April 24	Miami	W 107–89	Ben Gordon (27)	Ben Gordon (7)	Kirk Hinrich (8)	United Center; 23,097	2–0
3	April 27	@ Miami	W 104–96	Ben Gordon (27)	Luol Deng (11)	Kirk Hinrich (6)	American Airlines Arena; 20,280	3–0
4	April 29	@ Miami	W 92–79	Ben Gordon (24)	Luol Deng (12)	Gordon, Hinrich (4)	American Airlines Arena; 20,283	4–0

Conference Semifinals: 2–4 (home: 1–2; road: 1–2)

Game	Date	Team	Score	High points	High rebounds	High assists	Location Attendance	Series
1	May 5	@ Detroit	L 69–95	Luol Deng (18)	Wallace, Deng (8)	Kirk Hinrich (6)	The Palace of Auburn Hills; 22,076	0–1
2	May 7	@ Detroit	L 87–108	Tyrus Thomas (18)	Ben Wallace (7)	Kirk Hinrich (7)	The Palace of Auburn Hills; 22,076	0–2
3	May 10	Detroit	L 74–81	Luol Deng (21)	Luol Deng (14)	Kirk Hinrich (7)	United Center; 23,462	0–3
4	May 13	Detroit	W 102–87	Luol Deng (25)	Ben Wallace (17)	Kirk Hinrich (10)	United Center; 23,099	1–3
5	May 15	@ Detroit	W 108–92	Ben Gordon (28)	P. J. Brown (8)	Kirk Hinrich (13)	The Palace of Auburn Hills; 22,076	2–3
6	May 17	Detroit	L 85–95	P. J. Brown (20)	Ben Wallace (7)	Kirk Hinrich (11)	United Center; 23,030	2–4

2007 schedule

== Awards and records ==
- Luol Deng, NBA Sportsmanship Award
- Kirk Hinrich, NBA All-Defensive Second Team
- Ben Wallace, NBA All-Defensive Second Team
- Tyrus Thomas, NBA All-Rookie Team Second Team

== Roster ==
2006–07 Chicago Bulls roster
Players

Pos.	No.	Player	Height	Weight	DOB	From
F	35	Malik Allen	6 ft 10 in (2.08 m)	255 lb (116 kg)	1978-06-27	Villanova
G	11	Andre Barrett	5 ft 10 in (1.78 m)	172 lb (78 kg)	1982-02-21	Seton Hall
F	42	P. J. Brown	6 ft 11 in (2.11 m)	240 lb (109 kg)	1969-10-14	Louisiana Tech
F	9	Luol Deng	6 ft 8 in (2.03 m)	220 lb (100 kg)	1985-04-16	Duke
G	21	Chris Duhon	6 ft 1 in (1.85 m)	185 lb (84 kg)	1982-08-31	Duke
G	7	Ben Gordon	6 ft 3 in (1.91 m)	200 lb (91 kg)	1983-04-04	Connecticut
F	44	Adrian Griffin	6 ft 5 in (1.96 m)	217 lb (98 kg)	1974-07-04	Seton Hall
G	12	Kirk Hinrich	6 ft 3 in (1.91 m)	190 lb (86 kg)	1981-01-02	Kansas
F	38	Viktor Khryapa	6 ft 9 in (2.06 m)	210 lb (95 kg)	1982-08-03	Russia
F	5	Andres Nocioni	6 ft 7 in (2.01 m)	225 lb (102 kg)	1979-11-30	Argentina
G	2	Thabo Sefolosha	6 ft 6 in (1.98 m)	215 lb (98 kg)	1984-05-02	Switzerland
C	50	Mike Sweetney	6 ft 8 in (2.03 m)	275 lb (125 kg)	1982-10-25	Georgetown
F	24	Tyrus Thomas	6 ft 9 in (2.06 m)	215 lb (98 kg)	1986-08-17	Louisiana State
C	3	Ben Wallace	6 ft 9 in (2.06 m)	240 lb (109 kg)	1974-09-10	Virginia Union

Coaches
Head coach
- Scott Skiles
Assistant(s)
- Ron Adams
- Jim Boylan
- Pete Myers
- Mike Wilhelm
- Fred Tedeschi (trainer)

Legend
- (DP) Unsigned draft pick
- (FA) Free agent
- (S) Suspended
- (DL) On assignment to D-League affiliate
- Injured

Roster
Updated: January 2, 2007

== Player statistics ==
Legend
GP	Games played	GS	Games started	MPG	Minutes per game
FG%	Field-goal percentage	3P%	3-point field-goal percentage	FT%	Free-throw percentage
RPG	Rebounds per game	APG	Assists per game	SPG	Steals per game
BPG	Blocks per game	PPG	Points per game

=== Regular season ===
Player	GP	GS	MPG	FG%	3P%	FT%	RPG	APG	SPG	BPG	PPG
Malik Allen	60	1	10.6	.415	.000	.824	2.0	.3	.3	.3	4.0
Andre Barrett	6	0	4.8	.500	.	.	.8	1.2	.0	.0	1.3
P. J. Brown	72	49	20.2	.407	.000	.787	4.8	.7	.3	.7	6.1
Luol Deng	82	82	37.5	.517	.143	.777	7.1	2.5	1.2	.6	18.8
Chris Duhon	78	30	24.4	.408	.359	.752	2.2	4.0	.9	.1	7.2
Ben Gordon	82	51	33.0	.455	.413	.864	3.1	3.6	.8	.2	21.4
Adrian Griffin	54	1	10.8	.473	.000	.789	2.0	1.1	.6	.1	2.5
Kirk Hinrich	80	80	35.5	.448	.415	.835	3.4	6.3	1.3	.3	16.6
Viktor Khryapa	33	0	7.0	.386	.000	.731	1.7	.6	.3	.0	2.2
Andres Nocioni	53	31	26.5	.467	.383	.848	5.7	1.1	.5	.5	14.1
Thabo Sefolosha	71	4	12.2	.426	.357	.511	2.2	.8	.5	.2	3.6
Mike Sweetney	48	0	8.0	.433	.	.561	2.5	.6	.2	.2	3.2
Tyrus Thomas	72	4	13.4	.475	.000	.606	3.7	.6	.6	1.1	5.2
Ben Wallace	77	77	35.0	.453	.200	.408	10.7	2.4	1.4	2.0	6.4

=== Playoffs ===
Player	GP	GS	MPG	FG%	3P%	FT%	RPG	APG	SPG	BPG	PPG
Malik Allen	5	0	6.8	.167	.	.	1.4	.2	.2	.2	.8
P. J. Brown	10	10	22.8	.493	.	.739	4.7	1.2	.8	.2	8.3
Luol Deng	10	10	41.0	.524	.000	.807	8.7	2.4	1.0	.7	22.2
Chris Duhon	9	0	19.1	.290	.316	.800	1.8	2.3	.3	.1	3.6
Ben Gordon	10	10	39.5	.415	.436	.921	3.8	3.8	.9	.1	20.4
Adrian Griffin	4	0	2.3	.000	.	.	.3	.0	.3	.0	.0
Kirk Hinrich	10	10	36.2	.376	.302	.769	4.2	7.5	.9	.3	12.1
Andres Nocioni	10	0	19.7	.360	.333	.722	3.5	.8	.2	.5	8.8
Thabo Sefolosha	9	0	11.0	.385	.375	.583	1.9	.8	.2	.0	3.3
Mike Sweetney	1	0	3.0	.500	.	.000	.0	.0	.0	.0	2.0
Tyrus Thomas	10	0	12.2	.390	.	.633	3.4	.6	1.0	.5	5.1
Ben Wallace	10	10	36.9	.566	.000	.500	9.5	1.4	1.5	1.7	8.7

== Transactions ==
- June 28, 2006: Drafted F LaMarcus Aldridge in the first round (2nd overall) of the 2006 NBA draft
- June 28, 2006: Drafted F Rodney Carney in the first round (16th overall) of the 2006 NBA draft
- June 28, 2006: Traded F LaMarcus Aldridge and a second-round draft pick to the Portland Trail Blazers for F Tyrus Thomas and F Viktor Khryapa
- June 28, 2006: Traded F Rodney Carney, a second-round draft pick and cash to the Philadelphia 76ers for G Thabo Sefolosha
- July 7, 2006: Waived F Othella Harrington
- July 13, 2006: Signed free agent C Ben Wallace
- July 14, 2006: Traded C Tyson Chandler to the New Orleans Hornets for F P. J. Brown and G J. R. Smith
- July 20, 2006: Traded G J. R. Smith to the Denver Nuggets for G Howard Eisley and two second-round draft picks
- July 31, 2006: Signed G Adrian Griffin
- August 18, 2006: Traded G Eddie Basden to the Cleveland Cavaliers for C Martynas Andriuskevicius
- October 30, 2006: Waived C Luke Schenscher
- October 31, 2006: Re-signed G Kirk Hinrich
