= 2006–07 Philadelphia 76ers season =

NBA professional basketball team season

- Head coach: Maurice Cheeks
- Arena: Wachovia Center

Results
- Record: 35–47 (.427)
- Place: Division: 3rd (Atlantic); Conference: 10th (Eastern)
- Playoff finish: Did not qualify
- Stats at Basketball Reference

Local media
- Television: CSN Philadelphia, WPSG
- Radio: WIP, WPHT

The 2006–07 Philadelphia 76ers season was the 68th season of the franchise, 58th in the National Basketball Association (NBA). The Sixers finished with a record of 35–47. The 2006–07 Sixers season also marked the end of Allen Iverson's tenure with the Sixers, after a blockbuster trade sent him to Denver in return for Andre Miller, Joe Smith, and two first-round draft picks in the 2007 NBA draft. It was the Sixers’ first season since 1995-96 without Iverson on the roster. He would eventually return to the Sixers for the 2009-10 season. Despite the trade, and after having a record of 5–18 before the Iverson trade, the Sixers finished 30–29 for the remainder of the season.

== Key dates ==
- June 28: The 2006 NBA draft took place in New York City.
- July 1: The free agency period started.
- October 10: The Sixers pre-season started with a game against the Phoenix Suns.
- November 1: The Sixers season started with a game against the Atlanta Hawks.
- December 19: All-Star guard Allen Iverson is traded to the Denver Nuggets, ending his 11-year tenure with the Sixers.
- January 11: The Sixers buy out Chris Webber's contract for $25 million.
- January 22: The Sixers defeated the Denver Nuggets 108–97, in what was Iverson's first game against his former team.
- February 28: With a win against the Suns, the Sixers ended the Phoenix Suns' bid to become the first team to go undefeated against all Eastern Conference opponents on the road.
- April 15: The Sixers were officially eliminated from playoff contention after losing to the Orlando Magic.

== Draft picks ==
Philadelphia's selections from the 2006 NBA draft in New York City.

Round	Pick	Player	Position	Nationality	School/Club team
1	13	Thabo Sefolosha (traded to Atlanta)	Shooting guard	Switzerland	Angelico Biella (Italy)

== Roster ==
Philadelphia 76ers roster
Players
Coaches

Pos.	#	Name	Ht.	Wt.	From
PF	20	Louis Amundson	6 ft 9 in (2.06 m)	225 lb (102 kg)		UNLV
SG	25	Rodney Carney	6 ft 7 in (2.01 m)	205 lb (93 kg)		Memphis
C	1	Samuel Dalembert	6 ft 11 in (2.11 m)	250 lb (113 kg)		Seton Hall
SG	33	Willie Green	6 ft 3 in (1.91 m)	201 lb (91 kg)		Detroit Mercy
PF	44	Alan Henderson	6 ft 9 in (2.06 m)	240 lb (109 kg)		Indiana
C	45	Steven Hunter	7 ft 0 in (2.13 m)	240 lb (109 kg)		DePaul
SF	9	Andre Iguodala	6 ft 6 in (1.98 m)	207 lb (94 kg)		Arizona
SG	11	Bobby Jones	6 ft 7 in (2.01 m)	215 lb (98 kg)		Washington
SF	26	Kyle Korver	6 ft 6 in (1.98 m)	211 lb (96 kg)		Creighton
PG	7	Andre Miller	6 ft 2 in (1.88 m)	200 lb (91 kg)		Utah
PG	12	Kevin Ollie	6 ft 3 in (1.91 m)	195 lb (88 kg)		Connecticut
PF	42	Shavlik Randolph	6 ft 10 in (2.08 m)	240 lb (109 kg)		Duke
PF	8	Joe Smith	6 ft 10 in (2.08 m)	225 lb (102 kg)		Maryland
PG	23	Louis Williams	6 ft 1 in (1.85 m)	175 lb (79 kg)		South Gwinnett High School

Head coach
- Maurice Cheeks (UTEP)
Assistant(s)
- John Loyer (Akron)
- Henry Bibby (UCLA)
- Jim Lynam (Saint Joseph's)
- Moses Malone (Petersburg HS (VA))

Legend
- (DP) Unsigned draft pick
- (FA) Free agent
- (S) Suspended
- Injured

Roster
Updated: 2007-05-03

== Regular season ==
=== Standings ===
Atlantic Division	W	L	PCT	GB	Home	Road	Div
y-Toronto Raptors	47	35	.573	-	30–11	17–24	11–5
x-New Jersey Nets	41	41	.500	6	24–17	17–24	10–6
Philadelphia 76ers	35	47	.427	12	21–20	14–27	9–7
New York Knicks	33	49	.402	14	19–22	14–27	3–13
Boston Celtics	24	58	.293	23	12–29	12–29	7–9

#	Eastern Conference				
#	Team	W	L	PCT	GB
1	c-Detroit Pistons	53	29	.646	–
2	x-Cleveland Cavaliers	50	32	.610	3
3	y-Toronto Raptors	47	35	.573	6
4	y-Miami Heat	44	38	.537	9
5	x-Chicago Bulls	49	33	.598	4
6	x-New Jersey Nets	41	41	.500	12
7	x-Washington Wizards	41	41	.500	12
8	x-Orlando Magic	40	42	.488	13
9	Philadelphia 76ers	35	47	.427	18
10	Indiana Pacers	35	47	.427	18
11	New York Knicks	33	49	.402	20
12	Charlotte Bobcats	33	49	.402	20
13	Atlanta Hawks	30	52	.366	23
14	Milwaukee Bucks	28	54	.341	25
15	Boston Celtics	24	58	.293	29

=== Schedule ===
Game	Date	Opponent	Result	76ers points	Opponent score	Record	Streak	OT
1	November 1	Atlanta	Win	88	75	1-0	Won 1	
2	November 3	@ Orlando	Win	105	103	2-0	Won 2	
3	November 5	Miami	Win	107	98	3-0	Won 3	
4	November 7	@ Indiana	Loss	86	97	3-1	Lost 1	
5	November 8	@ Toronto	Loss	104	106	3-2	Lost 2	
6	November 10	Denver	Loss	101	108	3-3	Lost 3	
7	November 15	@ Seattle	Win	96	90	4-3	Won 1	
8	November 17	@ Phoenix	Loss	94	106	4-4	Lost 1	
9	November 18	@ LA Clippers	Loss	97	103	4-5	Lost 2	OT
10	November 21	Detroit	Loss	87	97	4-6	Lost 3	
11	November 22	@ Milwaukee	Loss	94	98	4-7	Lost 4	
12	November 24	Chicago	Win	123	108	5-7	Won 1	
13	November 25	@ Cleveland	Loss	95	108	5-8	Lost 1	
14	November 27	@ Miami	Loss	91	103	5-9	Lost 2	
15	December 2	@ New Jersey	Loss	107	112	5-10	Lost 3	
16	December 3	Minnesota	Loss	84	95	5-11	Lost 4	
17	December 6	@ Chicago	Loss	94	121	5-12	Lost 5	
18	December 8	Washington	Loss	98	113	5-13	Lost 6	
19	December 9	@ Orlando	Loss	84	86	5-14	Lost 7	
20	December 11	Portland	Loss	79	81	5-15	Lost 8	
21	December 13	Boston	Loss	81	101	5-16	Lost 9	
22	December 15	@ Dallas	Loss	79	93	5-17	Lost 10	
23	December 16	@ San Antonio	Loss	98	103	5-18	Lost 11	
24	December 20	Indiana	Loss	93	101	5-19	Lost 12	
25	December 22	@ Boston	Win	98	83	6-19	Won 1	
26	December 23	New York	Win	98	77	7-19	Won 2	
27	December 26	@ Golden State	Loss	97	116	7-20	Lost 1	
28	December 27	@ Sacramento	Loss	76	101	7-21	Lost 2	
29	December 29	@ Portland	Win	98	95	8-21	Won 1	
30	December 31	@ LA Lakers	Loss	94	104	8-22	Lost 1	
31	January 2	@ Denver	Win	108	97	9-22	Won 1	
32	January 3	@ Utah	Loss	87	98	9-23	Lost 1	
33	January 5	@ Minnesota	Loss	102	104	9-24	Lost 2	OT
34	January 9	Detroit	Loss	89	98	9-25	Lost 3	
35	January 10	@ New York	Loss	99	106	9-26	Lost 4	
36	January 12	Milwaukee	Win	110	97	10-26	Won 1	
37	January 13	@ Charlotte	Loss	83	89	10-27	Lost 1	
38	January 15	Toronto	Loss	86	104	10-28	Lost 2	
39	January 17	@ Memphis	Loss	102	118	10-29	Lost 3	
40	January 19	Miami	Win	98	95	11-29	Won 1	
41	January 21	San Antonio	Loss	85	99	11-30	Lost 1	
42	January 23	New Orleans/Oklahoma City	Win	102	96	12-30	Won 1	
43	January 24	@ Cleveland	Win	118	115	13-30	Won 2	
44	January 26	Cleveland	Loss	97	105	13-31	Lost 1	
45	January 27	@ Atlanta	Win	104	89	14-31	Won 1	
46	January 29	@ Houston	Loss	84	105	14-32	Lost 1	
47	January 31	@ New Orleans/Oklahoma City	Win	89	78	15-32	Won 1	
48	February 2	Golden State	Loss	101	102	15-33	Lost 1	
49	February 5	New Jersey	Win	100	98	16-33	Won 1	
50	February 7	Charlotte	Win	92	83	17-33	Won 2	
51	February 9	LA Clippers	Loss	89	90	17-34	Lost 1	
52	February 11	Dallas	Loss	89	106	17-35	Lost 2	
53	February 14	Washington	Loss	85	92	17-36	Lost 3	
54	February 21	New York	Win	104	84	18-36	Won 1	
55	February 23	@ Charlotte	Loss	87	102	18-37	Lost 1	
56	February 24	@ Milwaukee	Loss	90	109	18-38	Lost 2	
57	February 26	Sacramento	Win	89	82	19-38	Won 1	
58	February 28	Phoenix	Win	99	94	20-38	Won 2	
59	March 2	Memphis	Win	117	112	21-38	Won 3	
60	March 4	New Jersey	Win	99	86	22-38	Won 4	
61	March 7	Seattle	Win	92	89	23-38	Won 5	
62	March 9	LA Lakers	Win	108	92	24-38	Won 6	
63	March 10	@ Indiana	Win	100	96	25-38	Won 7	
64	March 13	@ Atlanta	Loss	92	104	25-39	Lost 1	
65	March 14	Chicago	Loss	87	88	25-40	Lost 2	
66	March 16	Utah	Win	89	88	26-40	Won 1	
67	March 18	Houston	Loss	74	124	26-41	Lost 1	
68	March 20	@ Detroit	Loss	75	96	26-42	Lost 2	
69	March 23	Charlotte	Win	106	97	27-42	Won 1	
70	March 24	@ Miami	Win	93	85	28-42	Won 2	
71	March 28	@ Washington	Loss	108	111	28-43	Lost 1	
72	March 30	Boston	Win	88	82	29-43	Won 1	
73	March 31	@ New Jersey	Loss	82	86	29-44	Lost 1	
74	April 4	@ New York	Win	92	90	30-44	Won 1	
75	April 6	Toronto	Loss	85	94	30-45	Lost 1	
76	April 8	Atlanta	Win	109	104	31-45	Won 1	
77	April 10	Indiana	Win	90	86	32-45	Won 2	
78	April 11	@ Boston	Win	102	94	33-45	Won 3	
79	April 14	Orlando	Loss	87	104	33-46	Lost 1	
80	April 15	@ Detroit	Win	102	91	34-46	Won 1	
81	April 17	Cleveland	Loss	92	98	34-47	Lost 1	
82	April 18	@ Toronto	Win	122	119	35-47	Won 1	

== Player statistics ==
Legend
GP	Games played	GS	Games started	MPG	Minutes per game
FG%	Field-goal percentage	3P%	3-point field-goal percentage	FT%	Free-throw percentage
RPG	Rebounds per game	APG	Assists per game	SPG	Steals per game
BPG	Blocks per game	PPG	Points per game

=== Regular season ===
Player	GP	GS	MPG	FG%	3P%	FT%	RPG	APG	SPG	BPG	PPG
Louis Amundson	10	0	8.7	.400	.000	.400	2.8	.1	.1	.8	1.6
Rodney Carney	67	35	17.4	.464	.347	.609	1.9	.4	.6	.3	6.6
Samuel Dalembert	82	82	30.9	.541	.000	.746	8.9	.8	.6	1.9	10.7
Willie Green	74	36	24.9	.411	.325	.667	2.1	1.5	.8	.1	11.3
Alan Henderson	38	5	11.0	.642	.000	.702	2.8	.3	.2	.3	3.1
Steven Hunter	70	41	22.9	.577	.000	.490	4.8	.4	.2	1.1	6.4
Andre Iguodala	76	76	40.3	.447	.310	.820	5.7	5.7	2.0	.4	18.2
Bobby Jones	44	5	7.6	.462	.111	.561	1.3	.4	.3	.0	2.5
Kyle Korver	74	1	30.9	.440	.430	.914	3.5	1.4	.8	.3	14.4
Andre Miller	57	56	37.6	.464	.053	.808	4.4	7.3	1.3	.1	13.6
Kevin Ollie	53	23	17.3	.433	.000	.822	1.4	2.5	.4	.0	3.8
Shavlik Randolph	13	6	13.8	.479	.000	.545	4.2	.3	.5	.8	4.5
Joe Smith	54	11	25.1	.445	.000	.846	6.7	.9	.6	.4	9.2
Louis Williams	61	0	11.3	.441	.324	.696	1.1	1.8	.4	.0	4.3

== Transactions ==
The 76ers have been involved in the following transactions during the 2006–07 season.

=== Trades ===
June 29, 2006	To Atlanta Hawks Rights to Rodney Carney (2006 16th overall draft pick), second-round draft pick and $1 million	To Atlanta Hawks Rights to Thabo Sefolosha (2006 13th overall draft pick)
December 19, 2006	To Denver Nuggets Allen Iverson and Ivan McFarlin	To Philadelphia 76ers Andre Miller, Joe Smith and two future first-round picks

== See also ==
- 2006–07 NBA season
