= 2006–07 Charlotte Bobcats season =

NBA professional basketball team season

- Head coach: Bernie Bickerstaff
- President: Michael Jordan
- General manager: Bernie Bickerstaff
- Owner: Robert L. Johnson
- Arena: Charlotte Bobcats Arena

Results
- Record: 33–49 (.402)
- Place: Division: 4th (Southeast); Conference: 11th (Eastern)
- Playoff finish: Did not qualify
- Stats at Basketball Reference

Local media
- Television: News 14 Carolina, WMYT
- Radio: WOLS

The 2006–07 Charlotte Bobcats season was Charlotte's 17th season in the National Basketball Association (NBA), and their third as the Bobcats.

== Draft picks ==
Round	Pick	Player	Nationality	Position	School/Club team
1	3	Adam Morrison	United States	SF	Gonzaga
2	50	Ryan Hollins	United States	C	UCLA

== Roster ==
Charlotte Bobcats roster
Players

Pos.	No.	Player	Height	Weight	DOB	From
G/F	15	Alan Anderson	6 ft 6 in (1.98 m)	220 lb (100 kg)		Michigan State
G	23	Derek Anderson	6 ft 5 in (1.96 m)	194 lb (88 kg)		Kentucky
C	7	Primož Brezec	7 ft 2 in (2.18 m)	252 lb (114 kg)		Slovenia
G	13	Matt Carroll	6 ft 6 in (1.98 m)	212 lb (96 kg)		Notre Dame
C	2	Melvin Ely	6 ft 10 in (2.08 m)	260 lb (118 kg)		Fresno State
G	20	Raymond Felton	6 ft 1 in (1.85 m)	198 lb (90 kg)		North Carolina
F/C	24	Othella Harrington	6 ft 9 in (2.06 m)	235 lb (107 kg)		Georgetown
F	5	Wálter Herrmann	6 ft 9 in (2.06 m)	225 lb (102 kg)		Argentina
C	1	Ryan Hollins	7 ft 0 in (2.13 m)	230 lb (104 kg)		UCLA
G	22	Brevin Knight	5 ft 10 in (1.78 m)	173 lb (78 kg)		Stanford
F	42	Sean May	6 ft 9 in (2.06 m)	266 lb (121 kg)		North Carolina
G	0	Jeff McInnis	6 ft 4 in (1.93 m)	190 lb (86 kg)		North Carolina
F	35	Adam Morrison	6 ft 8 in (2.03 m)	205 lb (93 kg)		Gonzaga
F/C	50	Emeka Okafor	6 ft 10 in (2.08 m)	252 lb (114 kg)		Connecticut
G/F	21	Bernard Robinson	6 ft 6 in (1.98 m)	210 lb (95 kg)		Michigan
C	43	Jake Voskuhl	6 ft 11 in (2.11 m)	245 lb (111 kg)		Connecticut
F	3	Gerald Wallace	6 ft 7 in (2.01 m)	215 lb (98 kg)		Alabama
F	55	Eric Williams	6 ft 8 in (2.03 m)	220 lb (100 kg)		Providence

Coaches
Head coach
- Bernie Bickerstaff (San Diego)
Assistant(s)
- Lee Rose (Transylvania)
- Phil Ford (North Carolina)
- Paul Mokeski (Kansas)
- Jeff Capel (Fayetteville State)
- Dell Curry (Virginia Tech)
- Mike Sanders (UCLA)

Legend
- (DP) Unsigned draft pick
- (FA) Free agent
- (S) Suspended
- Injured

== Regular season ==
=== Season standings ===
Southeast Division	W	L	PCT	GB	Home	Road	Div
y-Miami Heat	44	38	.537	-	27–14	17–24	9–7
x-Washington Wizards	41	41	.500	3	26–15	15–26	8–8
x-Orlando Magic	40	42	.488	4	25–16	15–26	9–7
Charlotte Bobcats	33	49	.402	11	20–21	13–28	9–7
Atlanta Hawks	30	52	.366	14	18–23	12–29	5–11

#	Eastern Conference				
#	Team	W	L	PCT	GB
1	c-Detroit Pistons	53	29	.646	–
2	x-Cleveland Cavaliers	50	32	.610	3
3	y-Toronto Raptors	47	35	.573	6
4	y-Miami Heat	44	38	.537	9
5	x-Chicago Bulls	49	33	.598	4
6	x-New Jersey Nets	41	41	.500	12
7	x-Washington Wizards	41	41	.500	12
8	x-Orlando Magic	40	42	.488	13
9	Philadelphia 76ers	35	47	.427	18
10	Indiana Pacers	35	47	.427	18
11	New York Knicks	33	49	.402	20
12	Charlotte Bobcats	33	49	.402	20
13	Atlanta Hawks	30	52	.366	23
14	Milwaukee Bucks	28	54	.341	25
15	Boston Celtics	24	58	.293	29

=== Game log ===
2006–07 Game Log
November (4-11)

Game	Date	Opponent	Score	High points	High rebounds	High assists	Location/Attendance	Record
1	November 1	Indiana	99–106	Okafor (19)	Okafor (13)	Knight (7)	Charlotte Bobcats Arena; 18,518	0–1
2	November 3	@ Memphis	83–96	Morrison (21)	Okafor (8)	Felton (8)	FedExForum; 13,787	0–2
3	November 4	Cleveland	92–88	Felton (23)	May (9)	Knight (7)	Charlotte Bobcats Arena; 19,147	1–2
4	November 8	@ Boston	108–110 (OT)	Okafor (28)	Okafor (18)	Knight (7)	TD Banknorth Garden; 15,183	1–3
5	November 10	Seattle	85–99	Okafor (20)	Okafor (15)	Knight (7)	Charlotte Bobcats Arena; 13,515	1–4
6	November 12	Denver	101–108	Emeka Okafor (22)	Emeka Okafor (15)	Brevin Knight (7)	Charlotte Bobcats Arena; 13,203	1–5
7	November 14	@ NO/Oklahoma City	85–94	Emeka Okafor (25)	Emeka Okafor (16)	Raymond Felton (5)	Ford Center; 16,623	1–6
8	November 15	@ San Antonio	95–92 (OT)	Morrison (27)	Okafor (9)	Knight (9)	AT&T Center; 18,797	2–6
9	November 18	@ Orlando	83–97	Okafor (26)	Okafor (9)	Felton (10)	TD Waterhouse Centre; 17,451	2–7
10	November 20	Dallas	85–93	Okafor (22)	Okafor (13)	Wallace, Knight (5)	Charlotte Bobcats Arena; 13,237	2–8
11	November 22	Boston	92–83	Morrison (26)	Okafor (13)	Felton (9)	Charlotte Bobcats Arena; 14,129	3–8
12	November 24	@ Detroit	95–104	Okafor (23)	Okafor (12)	Knight (9)	The Palace of Auburn Hills; 22,076	3–9
13	November 25	Miami	93–102	Adam Morrison (27)	Gerald Wallace, Emeka Okafor (11)	Brevin Knight (8)	Charlotte Bobcats Arena; 19,403	3–10
14	November 28	@ New Jersey	96–92	Adam Morrison (22)	Emeka Okafor, Sean May (7)	Sean May, Adam Morrison, Brevin Knight (5)	Continental Airlines Arena; 14,531	4–10
15	November 29	@ Atlanta	90–99	Raymond Felton, Sean May (21)	Sean May (17)	Raymond Felton (7)	Philips Arena; 13,296	4–11

December (5-10)

Game	Date	Opponent	Score	High points	High rebounds	High assists	Location/Attendance	Record
16	December 1	@ Washington	109–121	Adam Morrison (23)	Emeka Okafor (13)	Brevin Knight (9)	Verizon Center; 18,853	4–12
17	December 3	Detroit	97–89	Emeka Okafor (18)	Gerald Wallace (10)	Brevin Knight (14)	Charlotte Bobcats Arena; 13,272	5–12
18	December 6	San Antonio	76–96	Sean May (18)	Emeka Okafor (9)	Raymond Felton (9)	Charlotte Bobcats Arena; 14,066	5–13
19	December 8	Houston	62–92	Raymond Felton (16)	Emeka Okafor, Primoz Brezec, Sean May (6)	Raymond Felton (6)	Charlotte Bobcats Arena; 14,414	5–14
20	December 10	Phoenix	84–114	Sean May (26)	Sean May (10)	Raymond Felton (9)	Charlotte Bobcats Arena; 13,571	5–15
21	December 13	@ Cleveland	101–104	Adam Morrison (16)	Sean May (13)	Brevin Knight (14)	Quicken Loans Arena; 20,562	5–16
22	December 14	Orlando	99–89	Sean May (32)	Emeka Okafor (11)	Brevin Knight (7)	Charlotte Bobcats Arena; 17,751	6–16
23	December 16	Boston	100–106	Gerald Wallace (31)	Emeka Okafor (19)	Raymond Felton (6)	Charlotte Bobcats Arena; 15,109	6–17
24	December 20	@ New York	109–111 (2OT)	Gerald Wallace (28)	Emeka Okafor (13)	Raymond Felton (16)	Madison Square Garden; 17,462	6–18
25	December 22	Utah	101–89	Emeka Okafor (21)	Primoz Brezec (11)	Raymond Felton (12)	Charlotte Bobcats Arena; 14,310	7–18
26	December 23	@ Chicago	76–115	Melvin Ely (13)	Emeka Okafor (12)	Raymond Felton (9)	United Center; 22,093	7–19
27	December 26	@ Dallas	84–97	Adam Morrison (17)	Emeka Okafor (7)	Raymond Felton (9)	American Airlines Center; 20,423	7–20
28	December 27	Washington	107–114	Gerald Wallace (40)	Gerald Wallace (14)	Raymond Felton (8)	Charlotte Bobcats Arena; 17,221	7–21
29	December 29	L. A. Lakers	133–124 (3OT)	Gerald Wallace (28)	Emeka Okafor (25)	Raymond Felton (15)	Charlotte Bobcats Arena; 19,561	8–21
30	December 30	@ Indiana	113–102	Adam Morrison (30)	Emeka Okafor (14)	Raymond Felton (19)	Conseco Fieldhouse; 17,305	9–21

January (8-7)

Game	Date	Opponent	Score	High points	High rebounds	High assists	Location/Attendance	Record
31	January 1	Minnesota	96–102	Matt Carroll (23)	Emeka Okafor (14)	Raymond Felton (9)	Charlotte Bobcats Arena; 14,827	9–22
32	January 5	@ Orlando	74–106	Matt Carroll (19)	Primoz Brezec (12)	Raymond Felton (7)	Amway Arena; 17,154	9–23
33	January 10	@ Detroit	103–96	Raymond Felton (18)	Emeka Okafor (10)	Raymond Felton (7)	The Palace of Auburn Hills; 22,076	10–23
34	January 12	@ New York	126–110	Derek Anderson (29)	Emeka Okafor, Sean May (9)	Raymond Felton (14)	Madison Square Garden; 19,171	11–23
35	January 13	Philadelphia	89–83	Adam Morrison (17)	Sean May (10)	Raymond Felton (9)	Charlotte Bobcats Arena; 15,081	12–23
36	January 15	Milwaukee	91–99	Matt Carroll (22)	Emeka Okafor (12)	Raymond Felton (9)	Charlotte Bobcats Arena; 14,360	12–24
37	January 17	New Jersey	85–92	Raymond Felton (18)	Emeka Okafor (21)	Adam Morrison (7)	Charlotte Bobcats Arena; 13,077	12–25
38	January 19	@ Atlanta	96–75	Emeka Okafor (22)	Gerald Wallace (15)	Derek Anderson (5)	Philips Arena; 10,147	13–25
39	January 20	Atlanta	104–85	Matt Carroll (22)	Emeka Okafor (7)	Jeff McInnis (9)	Charlotte Bobcats Arena; 16,781	14–25
40	January 22	@ Toronto	84–105	Raymond Felton, Gerald Wallace (19)	Gerald Wallace (9)	Raymond Felton (8)	Air Canada Centre; 13,997	14–26
41	January 24	Detroit	92–103	Gerald Wallace (29)	Emeka Okafor (16)	Raymond Felton (8)	Charlotte Bobcats Arena; 15,148	14–27
42	January 26	@ L. A. Lakers	106–97 (OT)	Matt Carroll (24)	Emeka Okafor (18)	Jeff McInnis (6)	Staples Center; 18,997	15–27
43	January 27	@ Golden State	105–131	Adam Morrison (21)	Emeka Okafor (12)	Jeff McInnis (8)	Oracle Arena; 17,381	15–28
44	January 29	@ Denver	105–101	Gerald Wallace (25)	Gerald Wallace (13)	Raymond Felton (11)	Pepsi Center; 15,898	16–28
45	January 31	New York	104–87	Gerald Wallace (42)	Emeka Okafor (15)	Raymond Felton (10)	Charlotte Bobcats Arena; 13,985	17–28

February (5-8)

Game	Date	Opponent	Score	High points	High rebounds	High assists	Location/Attendance	Record
46	February 2	@ Cleveland	81–101	Gerald Wallace (16)	Emeka Okafor (7)	Raymond Felton, Jeff McInnis (4)	Quicken Loans Arena; 20,562	17–29
47	February 3	Golden State	98–90	Raymond Felton (22)	Gerald Wallace (16)	Gerald Wallace, Jeff McInnis (6)	Charlotte Bobcats Arena; 15,171	18–29
48	February 5	@ Miami	93–113	Raymond Felton (20)	Emeka Okafor (11)	Raymond Felton, Jeff McInnis (7)	AmericanAirlines Arena; 19,600	18–30
49	February 7	@ Philadelphia	83–92	Gerald Wallace, Emeka Okafor (16)	Gerald Wallace, Emeka Okafor, Matt Carroll (8)	Raymond Felton (10)	Wachovia Center; 11,027	18–31
50	February 9	Portland	100–108 (OT)	Gerald Wallace (30)	Gerald Wallace (15)	Raymond Felton (8)	Charlotte Bobcats Arena; 15,013	18–32
51	February 10	@ Houston	83–104	Raymond Felton (16)	Emeka Okafor (12)	Gerald Wallace, Raymond Felton, Jeff McInnis (5)	Toyota Center; 18,061	18–33
52	February 14	Chicago	100–85	Gerald Wallace (32)	Emeka Okafor (21)	Raymond Felton (9)	Charlotte Bobcats Arena; 14,908	19–33
53	February 20	NO/Oklahoma City	104–100	Raymond Felton, Gerald Wallace (21)	Emeka Okafor (15)	Raymond Felton (11)	Charlotte Bobcats Arena; 13,007	20–33
54	February 21	@ Minnesota	100–95	Adam Morrison (26)	Emeka Okafor (19)	Raymond Felton (7)	Target Center; 16,576	21–33
55	February 23	Philadelphia	102–87	Gerald Wallace, Matt Carroll, Adam Morrison (19)	Emeka Okafor (16)	Raymond Felton (7)	Charlotte Bobcats Arena; 15,781	22–33
56	February 24	Toronto	76–93	Matt Carroll, Adam Morrison (13)	Emeka Okafor (12)	Gerald Wallace, Raymond Felton (5)	Charlotte Bobcats Arena; 17,091	22–34
57	February 26	@ L. A. Clippers	93–100	Gerald Wallace (20)	Gerald Wallace (12)	Raymond Felton (7)	Staples Center; 18,442	22–35
58	February 28	@ Sacramento	120–135	Gerald Wallace (31)	Gerald Wallace (6)	Gerald Wallace (9)	Arco Arena; 17,317	22–36

March (6-9)

Game	Date	Opponent	Score	High points	High rebounds	High assists	Location/Attendance	Record
59	March 1	@ Portland	90–127	Matt Carroll (20)	Jake Voskuhl, Walter Herrmann (5)	Brevin Knight (4)	Rose Garden Arena; 15,063	22–37
60	March 4	@ Seattle	89–96	Gerald Wallace (19)	Gerald Wallace (9)	Adam Morrison (5)	KeyArena; 15,574	22–38
61	March 5	@ Utah	95–120	Gerald Wallace (33)	Jake Voskuhl (5)	Jeff McInnis (5)	EnergySolutions Arena; 19,911	22–39
62	March 7	@ Phoenix	106–115 (OT)	Gerald Wallace, Adam Morrison (22)	Gerald Wallace (15)	Brevin Knight (9)	US Airways Center; 18,422	22–40
63	March 10	Memphis	107–115	Gerald Wallace, Raymond Felton (24)	Gerald Wallace (17)	Brevin Knight (7)	Charlotte Bobcats Arena; 17,106	22–41
64	March 12	Orlando	119–108	Derek Anderson (24)	Derek Anderson, Gerald Wallace, Jake Voskuhl (5)	Derek Anderson (10)	Charlotte Bobcats Arena; 13,762	23–41
65	March 14	Sacramento	111–108	Matt Carroll (22)	Jake Voskuhl (13)	Raymond Felton (8)	Charlotte Bobcats Arena; 12,848	24–41
66	March 16	L. A. Clippers	93–102	Raymond Felton (18)	Jake Voskuhl (9)	Gerald Wallace, Raymond Felton (5)	Charlotte Bobcats Arena; 17,103	24–42
67	March 17	@ Milwaukee	91–97	Gerald Wallace (20)	Gerald Wallace (13)	Jeff McInnis (8)	Bradley Center; 16,674	24–43
68	March 20	Cleveland	108–100 (OT)	Gerald Wallace (27)	Gerald Wallace (11)	Raymond Felton (6)	Charlotte Bobcats Arena; 17,043	25–43
69	March 21	@ Boston	92–84	Raymond Felton (19)	Gerald Wallace (8)	Brevin Knight (8)	TD Banknorth Garden; 14,743	26–43
70	March 23	@ Philadelphia	97–106	Gerald Wallace (21)	Adam Morrison (5)	Gerald Wallace (7)	Wachovia Center; 17,104	26–44
71	March 24	New Jersey	107–113 (OT)	Matt Carroll (27)	Walter Herrmann (7)	Brevin Knight (8)	Charlotte Bobcats Arena; 18,180	26–45
72	March 28	Atlanta	101–87	Gerald Wallace (31)	Gerald Wallace (9)	Raymond Felton (10)	Charlotte Bobcats Arena; 14,470	27–45
73	March 30	Milwaukee	97–81	Gerald Wallace (24)	Gerald Wallace (13)	Raymond Felton (11)	Charlotte Bobcats Arena; 14,739	28–45

April (5-4)

Game	Date	Opponent	Score	High points	High rebounds	High assists	Location/Attendance	Record
74	April 1	@ Toronto	94–107	Walter Herrmann (22)	Walter Herrmann (8)	Brevin Knight (7)	Air Canada Centre; 19,023	28–46
75	April 3	Washington	122–102	Gerald Wallace (34)	Gerald Wallace (14)	Raymond Felton (14)	Charlotte Bobcats Arena; 14,345	29–46
76	April 4	@ Washington	108–100	Gerald Wallace (27)	Gerald Wallace (12)	Gerald Wallace (8)	Verizon Center; 15,292	30–46
77	April 6	Indiana	102–112	Gerald Wallace (29)	Gerald Wallace, Emeka Okafor (9)	Raymond Felton (7)	Charlotte Bobcats Arena; 18,939	30–47
78	April 8	@ Miami	111–103 (OT)	Gerald Wallace (30)	Gerald Wallace, Emeka Okafor (8)	Brevin Knight (7)	AmericanAirlines Arena; 19,600	31–47
79	April 10	Miami	92–82	Gerald Wallace (24)	Gerald Wallace, Emeka Okafor (10)	Brevin Knight (8)	Charlotte Bobcats Arena; 17,105	32–47
80	April 13	@ Chicago	81–100	Walter Herrmann (14)	Emeka Okafor (11)	Brevin Knight (5)	United Center; 22,340	32–48
81	April 14	@ Milwaukee	113–92	Walter Herrmann (30)	Walter Herrmann (9)	Jeff McInnis (11)	Bradley Center; 17,976	33–48
82	April 18	New York	93–94	Walter Herrmann (22)	Emeka Okafor (8)	Brevin Knight (13)	Charlotte Bobcats Arena; 17,223	33–49

== Player statistics ==
=== Regular season ===
Player	POS	GP	GS	MP	REB	AST	STL	BLK	PTS	MPG	RPG	APG	SPG	BPG	PPG
Raymond Felton	PG	78	75	2,832	267	545	118	10	1,093	36.3	3.4	7.0	1.5	.1	14.0
Adam Morrison	PF	78	23	2,326	230	163	28	6	917	29.8	2.9	2.1	.4	.1	11.8
Jake Voskuhl	C	73	9	1,043	256	44	30	24	319	14.3	3.5	.6	.4	.3	4.4
Gerald Wallace	SF	72	71	2,640	518	185	144	69	1,304	36.7	7.2	2.6	2.0	1.0	18.1
Matt Carroll	SG	72	47	1,878	207	91	53	9	869	26.1	2.9	1.3	.7	.1	12.1
Emeka Okafor	C	67	65	2,329	757	80	57	172	963	34.8	11.3	1.2	.9	2.6	14.4
Primož Brezec	C	58	40	838	184	23	11	23	288	14.4	3.2	.4	.2	.4	5.0
Derek Anderson	SF	50	32	1,190	113	133	52	7	399	23.8	2.3	2.7	1.0	.1	8.0
Walter Herrmann	PF	48	12	936	139	26	17	7	442	19.5	2.9	.5	.4	.1	9.2
Brevin Knight	PG	45	25	1,273	115	296	67	3	408	28.3	2.6	6.6	1.5	.1	9.1
Jeff McInnis	PG	38	3	702	62	124	14	0	165	18.5	1.6	3.3	.4	.0	4.3
Sean May	PF	35	8	838	233	66	19	24	416	23.9	6.7	1.9	.5	.7	11.9
Ryan Hollins	C	27	0	185	31	1	4	7	64	6.9	1.1	.0	.1	.3	2.4
Othella Harrington	PF	26	0	220	38	6	1	1	67	8.5	1.5	.2	.0	.0	2.6
Melvin Ely^{†}	PF	24	0	244	39	14	2	6	70	10.2	1.6	.6	.1	.3	2.9
Bernard Robinson^{†}	SG	21	0	241	42	17	13	1	51	11.5	2.0	.8	.6	.0	2.4
Alan Anderson	SG	17	0	256	32	21	7	0	98	15.1	1.9	1.2	.4	.0	5.8
Eric Williams^{†}	SF	5	0	33	3	1	1	0	12	6.6	.6	.2	.2	.0	2.4

- ^{†} Denotes player spent time with another team in the season. Stats reflect time with the Bobcats only.

== Awards and records ==
NBA All-Rookie Second Team

- Wálter Herrmann
- Adam Morrison
