= 2006–07 Washington Wizards season =

NBA professional basketball team season

- Head coach: Eddie Jordan
- President: Ernie Grunfeld
- General manager: Ernie Grunfeld
- Owners: Raul Fernandez, Abe Pollin
- Arena: Verizon Center

Results
- Record: 41–41 (.500)
- Place: Division: 2nd (Southeast); Conference: 7th (Eastern)
- Playoff finish: First Round (lost to Cavaliers 0–4)
- Stats at Basketball Reference

Local media
- Television: CSN Mid-Atlantic, MyNetworkTV Washington, News Channel 8
- Radio: ESPN 980

The 2006–07 Washington Wizards season was their 46th season in the National Basketball Association. The Wizards made the playoffs for the third straight season. The Wizards were then eliminated for the second straight time by the Cavaliers in just the first round. The Wizards had the fourth best team offensive rating and the third worst team defensive rating in the NBA.

Key dates prior to the start of the season:

- The 2006 NBA draft took place in New York City on June 28.
- The free agency period begins in July.

== Draft picks ==
Washington's selections from the 2006 NBA draft in New York City.

Round	Pick	Player	Position	Nationality	School/Club team
1	18	Oleksiy Pecherov	Power Forward	Ukraine	
2	48	Vladimir Veremeenko	Small forward	Belarus/Russia	

== Roster ==
Washington Wizards roster
Players

Pos.	No.	Player	Height	Weight	DOB	From
PG	0	Gilbert Arenas	6 ft 4 in (1.93 m)	215 lb (98 kg)	1982-01-06	Arizona
PF	32	Andray Blatche	6 ft 11 in (2.11 m)	248 lb (112 kg)	1986-08-22	South Kent School (CT)
C	52	Calvin Booth	6 ft 11 in (2.11 m)	230 lb (104 kg)	1976-05-07	Pennsylvania State
SF	3	Caron Butler	6 ft 7 in (2.01 m)	228 lb (103 kg)	1980-03-13	Connecticut
PG	6	Antonio Daniels	6 ft 4 in (1.93 m)	205 lb (93 kg)	1975-03-19	Bowling Green
SF	42	Mike Hall	6 ft 8 in (2.03 m)	230 lb (104 kg)	1984-06-05	George Washington
SF	24	Jarvis Hayes	6 ft 7 in (2.01 m)	220 lb (100 kg)	1981-08-09	Georgia
C	33	Brendan Haywood	7 ft 0 in (2.13 m)	263 lb (119 kg)	1979-11-27	North Carolina
PF	4	Antawn Jamison	6 ft 9 in (2.06 m)	235 lb (107 kg)	1976-06-12	North Carolina
SG	8	Roger Mason	6 ft 5 in (1.96 m)	212 lb (96 kg)	1980-09-10	Virginia
PF	51	Michael Ruffin	6 ft 9 in (2.06 m)	246 lb (112 kg)	1977-01-21	Tulsa
PF	9	Darius Songaila	6 ft 9 in (2.06 m)	248 lb (112 kg)	1978-02-14	Wake Forest
SG	2	DeShawn Stevenson	6 ft 5 in (1.96 m)	218 lb (99 kg)	1981-04-03	Washington Union HS (CA)
SG	21	Donell Taylor	6 ft 6 in (1.98 m)	180 lb (82 kg)	1982-07-26	UAB
C	36	Etan Thomas	6 ft 10 in (2.08 m)	260 lb (118 kg)	1978-04-01	Syracuse

Coaches
Head coach
- Eddie Jordan
Assistant(s)
- Phil Hubbard
- Mike O'Koren
- Wes Unseld Jr.
- Tom Young
- Eric Waters (trainer)

Legend
- (DP) Unsigned draft pick
- (FA) Free agent
- (S) Suspended
- Injured

Roster
Updated: February 28, 2007

== Regular season ==
=== Standings ===
Southeast Division	W	L	PCT	GB	Home	Road	Div
y-Miami Heat	44	38	.537	-	27–14	17–24	9–7
x-Washington Wizards	41	41	.500	3	26–15	15–26	8–8
x-Orlando Magic	40	42	.488	4	25–16	15–26	9–7
Charlotte Bobcats	33	49	.402	11	20–21	13–28	9–7
Atlanta Hawks	30	52	.366	14	18–23	12–29	5–11

#	Eastern Conference				
#	Team	W	L	PCT	GB
1	c-Detroit Pistons	53	29	.646	–
2	x-Cleveland Cavaliers	50	32	.610	3
3	y-Toronto Raptors	47	35	.573	6
4	y-Miami Heat	44	38	.537	9
5	x-Chicago Bulls	49	33	.598	4
6	x-New Jersey Nets	41	41	.500	12
7	x-Washington Wizards	41	41	.500	12
8	x-Orlando Magic	40	42	.488	13
9	Philadelphia 76ers	35	47	.427	18
10	Indiana Pacers	35	47	.427	18
11	New York Knicks	33	49	.402	20
12	Charlotte Bobcats	33	49	.402	20
13	Atlanta Hawks	30	52	.366	23
14	Milwaukee Bucks	28	54	.341	25
15	Boston Celtics	24	58	.293	29

=== November ===
Record: 5–9; home: 5–2; road: 0–7

#	Date	Visitor	Score	Home	OT	Leading scorer	Attendance	Record
1	1 November 2006	Wizards	94–97	Cavaliers	NA	Caron Butler (23)	--	0–1
2	4 November 2006	Celtics	117–124	Wizards	NA	Gilbert Arenas (44)	--	1–1
3	6 November 2006	Wizards	103–106	Magic	NA	Antawn Jamison (29)	--	1–2
4	8 November 2006	Pacers	91–117	Wizards	NA	Gilbert Arenas (40)	--	2–2
5	10 November 2006	Bucks	111–116	Wizards	NA	Gilbert Arenas (29)	--	3–2
6	12 November 2006	Nets	105–93	Wizards	1	Gilbert Arenas (25)	--	3–3
7	15 November 2006	Wizards	82–102	Knicks	NA	Gilbert Arenas (22)	--	3–4
8	17 November 2006	Wizards	91–100	Pistons	NA	Caron Butler (24)	--	3–5
9	18 November 2006	Cavaliers	99–111	Wizards	NA	Gilbert Arenas (45)	--	4–5
10	21 November 2006	Wizards	80–107	Mavericks	NA	Gilbert Arenas (29)	--	4–6
11	22 November 2006	Wizards	82–86	Rockets	NA	Gilbert Arenas (26)	--	4–7
12	24 November 2006	Wizards	80–95	Grizzlies	NA	Caron Butler (22)	--	4–8
13	25 November 2006	Pistons	115–111	Wizards	NA	Gilbert Arenas (28)	--	4–9
14	28 November 2006	Hawks	95–96	Wizards	NA	Two-way tie (21)	--	5–9

=== December ===
Record: 12–4; home: 6–1; road: 6–3

#	Date	Visitor	Score	Home	OT	Leading scorer	Attendance	Record
15	1 December 2006	Bobcats	109–121	Wizards	NA	Gilbert Arenas (33)	--	6–9
16	2 December 2006	Wizards	94–112	Bulls	NA	Caron Butler (21)	--	6–10
17	4 December 2006	Mavericks	97–106	Wizards	NA	Gilbert Arenas (38)	--	7–10
18	6 December 2006	Wizards	113–102	Knicks	NA	Gilbert Arenas (38)	--	8–10
19	8 December 2006	Wizards	113–98	Sixers	NA	Gilbert Arenas (32)	--	9–10
20	9 December 2006	Rockets	114–109	Wizards	NA	Gilbert Arenas (41)	--	9–11
21	13 December 2006	Nuggets	91–120	Wizards	NA	Gilbert Arenas (34)	--	10–11
22	15 December 2006	Heat	95–106	Wizards	NA	Caron Butler (30)	--	11–11
23	17 December 2006	Wizards	147–141	Lakers	1	Gilbert Arenas (60)	--	12–11
24	18 December 2006	Wizards	108–117	Nuggets	NA	Caron Butler (26)	--	12–12
25	21 December 2006	Wizards	126–119	Kings	NA	Antawn Jamison (33)	--	13–12
26	22 December 2006	Wizards	144–139	Suns	1	Gilbert Arenas (54)	--	14–12
27	26 December 2006	Grizzlies	101–116	Wizards	NA	Gilbert Arenas (31)	--	15–12
28	27 December 2006	Wizards	114–107	Bobcats	NA	Gilbert Arenas (39)	--	16–12
29	29 December 2006	Magic	111–112	Wizards	NA	Gilbert Arenas (36)	--	17–12
30	30 December 2006	Wizards	102–119	Bucks	NA	Caron Butler (29)	--	17–13

=== January ===
Record: 10–5; home: 7–1; road: 3–4

#	Date	Visitor	Score	Home	OT	Leading scorer	Attendance	Record
31	3 January 2007	Bucks	105–108	Wizards	NA	Gilbert Arenas (32)	--	18–13
32	5 January 2007	Clippers	105–116	Wizards	NA	Gilbert Arenas (35)	--	19–13
33	7 January 2007	Wizards	111–116	Raptors	NA	Gilbert Arenas (33)	--	19–14
34	10 January 2007	Bulls	103–113	Wizards	NA	Caron Butler (26)	--	20–14
35	12 January 2007	Wizards	97–104	null	NA	Gilbert Arenas (23)	--	20–15
36	13 January 2007	Wizards	80–93	Spurs	NA	Gilbert Arenas (17)	--	20–16
37	15 January 2007	Jazz	111–114	Wizards	NA	Gilbert Arenas (51)	--	21–16
38	17 January 2007	Knicks	98–99	Wizards	NA	Caron Butler (27)	--	22–16
39	19 January 2007	Wizards	114–93	Magic	NA	Antawn Jamison (31)	--	23–16
40	20 January 2007	Celtics	110–115	Wizards	1	Two-way tie (23)	--	24–16
41	23 January 2007	Suns	127–105	Wizards	NA	Gilbert Arenas (31)	--	24–17
42	26 January 2007	Wizards	99–96	Pistons	NA	Antawn Jamison (35)	--	25–17
43	28 January 2007	Wizards	105–91	Celtics	NA	Antawn Jamison (34)	--	26–17
44	30 January 2007	Pistons	99–104	Wizards	NA	Gilbert Arenas (36)	--	27–17
45	31 January 2007	Wizards	109–119	Raptors	NA	Gilbert Arenas (27)	--	27–18

=== February ===
Record: 4–7; home: 3–4; road: 1–3

#	Date	Visitor	Score	Home	OT	Leading scorer	Attendance	Record
46	3 February 2007	Lakers	118–102	Wizards	NA	Gilbert Arenas (37)	--	27–19
47	5 February 2007	SuperSonics	108–118	Wizards	NA	Caron Butler (38)	--	28–19
48	7 February 2007	Spurs	110–83	Wizards	NA	Gilbert Arenas (29)	--	28–20
49	11 February 2007	Trail Blazers	94–73	Wizards	NA	DeShawn Stevenson (12)	--	28–21
50	14 February 2007	Wizards	92–85	Sixers	NA	Gilbert Arenas (22)	--	29–21
51	20 February 2007	Timberwolves	100–112	Wizards	NA	Gilbert Arenas (38)	--	30–21
52	22 February 2007	Kings	106–109	Wizards	NA	Gilbert Arenas (43)	--	31–21
53	23 February 2007	Wizards	90–105	Bulls	NA	Gilbert Arenas (36)	--	31–22
54	25 February 2007	Wizards	94–98	Timberwolves	NA	DeShawn Stevenson (21)	--	31–23
55	27 February 2007	Wizards	101–113	Nets	NA	Gilbert Arenas (26)	--	31–24
56	28 February 2007	Heat	92–83	Wizards	NA	DeShawn Stevenson (19)	--	31–25

=== March ===
Record: 7–8; home: 5–2; road: 2–6

#	Date	Visitor	Score	Home	OT	Leading scorer	Attendance	Record
57	2 March 2007	Hawks	92–93	Wizards	NA	Antawn Jamison (22)	--	32–25
58	4 March 2007	Warriors	106–107	Wizards	NA	Gilbert Arenas (32)	--	33–25
59	6 March 2007	Raptors	109–129	Wizards	NA	Two-way tie (25)	--	34–25
60	7 March 2007	Wizards	97–100	Hawks	NA	Gilbert Arenas (28)	--	34–26
61	10 March 2007	Knicks	90–89	Wizards	NA	Gilbert Arenas (25)	--	34–27
62	11 March 2007	Wizards	104–106	Heat	NA	Gilbert Arenas (33)	--	34–28
63	14 March 2007	Wizards	112–96	Pacers	NA	Gilbert Arenas (35)	--	35–28
64	17 March 2007	null	103–125	Wizards	NA	Gilbert Arenas (30)	--	36–28
65	20 March 2007	Wizards	98–100	Trail Blazers	NA	Antawn Jamison (27)	--	36–29
66	21 March 2007	Wizards	108–106	SuperSonics	NA	Gilbert Arenas (42)	--	37–29
67	23 March 2007	Wizards	128–135	Warriors	NA	Gilbert Arenas (29)	--	37–30
68	24 March 2007	Wizards	105–111	Clippers	NA	Gilbert Arenas (30)	--	37–31
69	26 March 2007	Wizards	97–103	Jazz	NA	Gilbert Arenas (32)	--	37–32
70	28 March 2007	Sixers	108–111	Wizards	NA	DeShawn Stevenson (28)	--	38–32
71	30 March 2007	Raptors	123–118	Wizards	1	Gilbert Arenas (34)	--	38–33

=== April ===
Record: 3–8; home: 0–5; road: 3–3

#	Date	Visitor	Score	Home	OT	Leading scorer	Attendance	Record
72	1 April 2007	Wizards	121–107	Bucks	NA	Two-way tie (19)	--	39–33
73	3 April 2007	Wizards	102–122	Bobcats	NA	Gilbert Arenas (33)	--	39–34
74	4 April 2007	Bobcats	108–100	Wizards	NA	Antawn Jamison (25)	--	39–35
75	6 April 2007	Cavaliers	99–94	Wizards	NA	Antawn Jamison (27)	--	39–36
76	7 April 2007	Wizards	114–120	Nets	1	Antawn Jamison (37)	--	39–37
77	10 April 2007	Nets	96–92	Wizards	NA	Antawn Jamison (26)	--	39–38
78	11 April 2007	Wizards	82–85	Heat	NA	Brendan Haywood (14)	--	39–39
79	13 April 2007	Wizards	98–85	Hawks	NA	DeShawn Stevenson (25)	--	40–39
80	15 April 2007	Bulls	101–68	Wizards	NA	DeShawn Stevenson (13)	--	40–40
81	17 April 2007	Magic	95–89	Wizards	NA	Antawn Jamison (48)	--	40–41
82	18 April 2007	Wizards	98–95	Pacers	NA	Antawn Jamison (19)	--	41–41

- Green background indicates win.
- Red background indicates loss.

== Playoffs ==
=== Game log ===
2007 playoff game log
First round: 0–4 (home: 0–2; road: 0–2)

Game	Date	Team	Score	High points	High rebounds	High assists	Location Attendance	Series
1	April 22	@ Cleveland	L 82–97	Antawn Jamison (28)	Antawn Jamison (14)	Antonio Daniels (11)	Quicken Loans Arena; 20,562	0–1
2	April 25	@ Cleveland	L 102–109	Antawn Jamison (31)	Antawn Jamison (10)	Antonio Daniels (11)	Quicken Loans Arena; 20,562	0–2
3	April 28	Cleveland	L 92–98	Antawn Jamison (38)	Antawn Jamison (11)	Antonio Daniels (13)	Verizon Center; 20,173	0–3
4	April 30	Cleveland	L 90–97	Antawn Jamison (31)	Antonio Daniels (6)	Antonio Daniels (12)	Verizon Center; 20,173	0–4

2007 playoff schedule

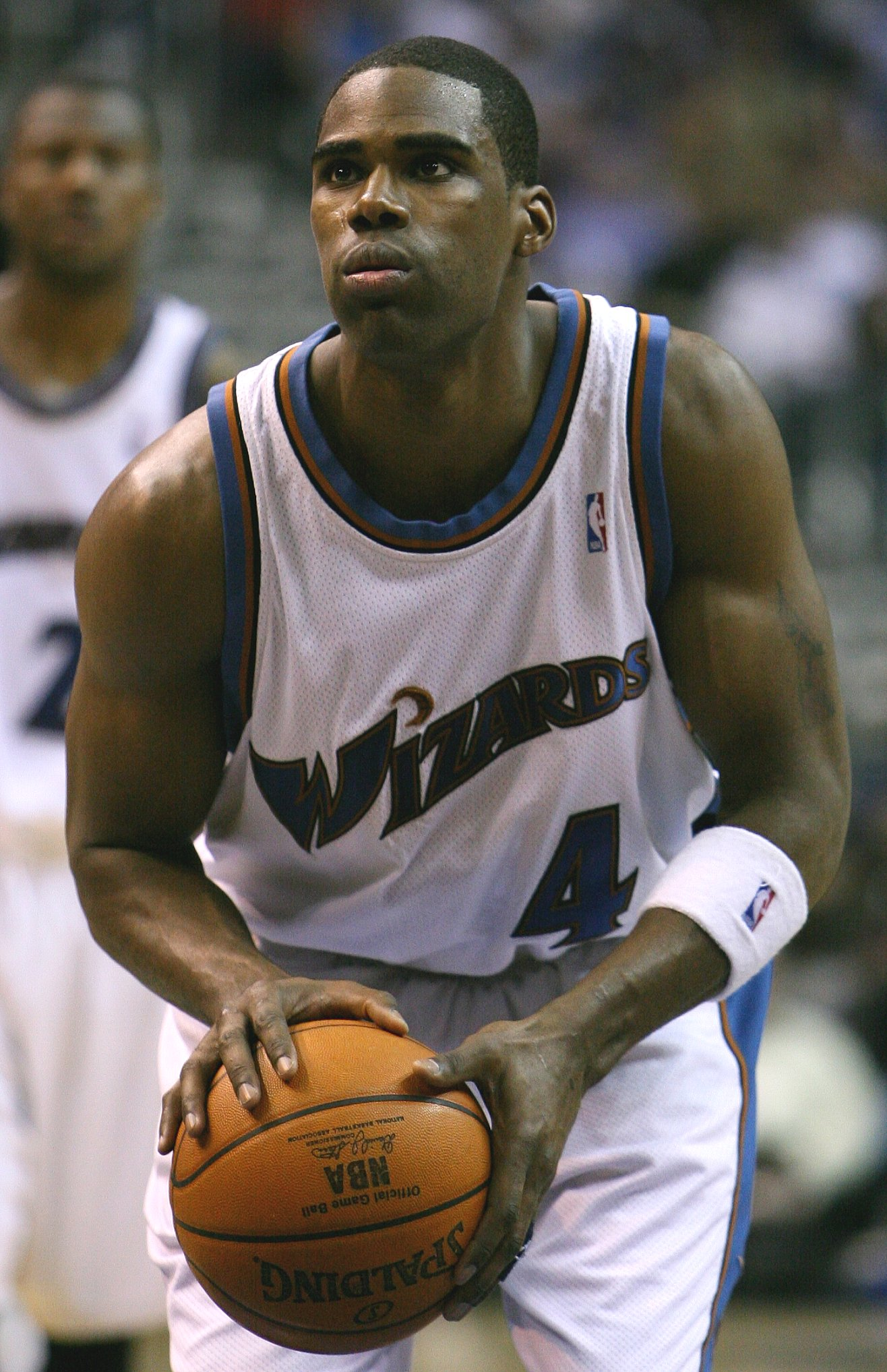
Antawn Jamison led the Wizards in scoring in every game during the playoffs.

== Player stats ==
Legend
GP	Games played	GS	Games started	MPG	Minutes per game
FG%	Field-goal percentage	3P%	3-point field-goal percentage	FT%	Free-throw percentage
RPG	Rebounds per game	APG	Assists per game	SPG	Steals per game
BPG	Blocks per game	PPG	Points per game

=== Regular season ===
Player	GP	GS	MPG	FG%	3P%	FT%	RPG	APG	SPG	BPG	PPG
DeShawn Stevenson	82	82	29.5	.461	.404	.704	2.6	2.7	.8	.2	11.2
Jarvis Hayes	81	17	20.1	.410	.361	.845	2.6	1.0	.6	.2	7.2
Antonio Daniels	80	8	22.0	.442	.302	.832	1.9	3.6	.5	.1	7.1
Brendan Haywood	77	49	22.6	.558		.548	6.2	.6	.4	1.1	6.6
Gilbert Arenas	74	73	39.8	.418	.351	.844	4.6	6.0	1.9	.2	28.4
Antawn Jamison	70	70	38.0	.450	.364	.736	8.0	1.9	1.1	.5	19.8
Etan Thomas	65	32	19.2	.574		.558	5.8	.4	.3	1.4	6.1
Caron Butler	63	63	39.3	.463	.250	.863	7.4	3.7	2.1	.3	19.1
Roger Mason Jr.	62	0	7.9	.330	.324	.875	.7	.6	.2	.1	2.7
Andray Blatche	56	13	12.2	.437	.148	.612	3.4	.7	.3	.6	3.7
Donell Taylor	47	1	7.9	.400	.176	.524	1.1	1.0	.4	.1	2.7
Calvin Booth	44	1	8.6	.470	.500	.600	1.8	.4	.1	.7	1.6
Darius Songaila	37	1	18.9	.524	.000	.852	3.6	1.0	.5	.3	7.6
Michael Ruffin	30	0	9.0	.278		.368	2.1	.2	.2	.3	.6
James Lang	11	0	5.0	.444		.600	1.0	.2	.0	.3	1.0
Mike Hall	2	0	6.5	.250			1.0	.5	.0	.0	1.0

=== Playoffs ===
Player	GP	GS	MPG	FG%	3P%	FT%	RPG	APG	SPG	BPG	PPG
Antonio Daniels	4	4	44.0	.447	.200	.857	4.5	11.8	1.3	.3	13.3
Antawn Jamison	4	4	43.3	.476	.346	.750	9.8	1.3	.5	1.0	32.0
Jarvis Hayes	4	4	34.8	.326	.368	.857	3.5	1.0	.5	.3	10.8
DeShawn Stevenson	4	4	30.5	.196	.158	.429	2.5	1.8	.5	.8	6.0
Etan Thomas	4	4	21.0	.412		.667	5.5	.3	.5	.8	5.0
Darius Songaila	4	0	22.5	.488	.000	1.000	3.3	1.0	.8	.0	10.8
Roger Mason Jr.	4	0	14.0	.438	.500	.833	.5	.3	.3	.0	6.0
Michael Ruffin	4	0	7.0	.333	.000		2.3	.0	.8	.0	.5
Brendan Haywood	3	0	11.3	.714		.750	1.7	.3	.3	.0	4.3
Andray Blatche	2	0	12.5	.667		1.000	3.5	.0	.0	.0	4.5
Donell Taylor	2	0	8.5	.167		1.000	1.5	2.0	.0	.0	1.5
Calvin Booth	1	0	18.0	.667			4.0	1.0	1.0	.0	4.0

- ^{†} Denotes player spent time with another team in the season. Stats reflect time with the Wizards only.

== Awards and records ==
=== Awards ===
- Gilbert Arenas, All-NBA Second Team

OC Chanel

== Transactions ==
The Wizards have been involved in the following transactions during the 2006–07 season. Transactions listed are from July 1, 2006, to June 30, 2007.

July 19, 2006- Signed Darius Songaila as a free agent.

August 5, 2006- Signed DeShawn Stevenson as a free agent.

September 13, 2006- Signed Roger Mason as a free agent. Signed Kevinn Pinkney as a free agent.

September 14, 2006- Signed James Lang as a free agent.

October 10, 2006- Waived Kevinn Pinkney.

February 28, 2007- Signed Mike Hall to two 10-day contracts, then signed to a contract for the rest of the season. Waived James Lang.

June 28, 2007- Drafted Nick Young in the 1st round (16th pick) of the 2007 NBA Draft. Drafted Dominic McGuire in the 2nd round (47th pick) of the 2007 NBA Draft.

== See also ==
- 2006–07 NBA season
