= 2006–07 New York Knicks season =

Season of National Basketball Association team the New York Knicks

- Head coach: Isiah Thomas
- General manager: Isiah Thomas
- Owners: Cablevision
- Arena: Madison Square Garden

Results
- Record: 33–49 (.402)
- Place: Division: 4th (Atlantic); Conference: 11th (Eastern)
- Playoff finish: Did not qualify

Local media
- Television: MSG Network
- Radio: WEPN

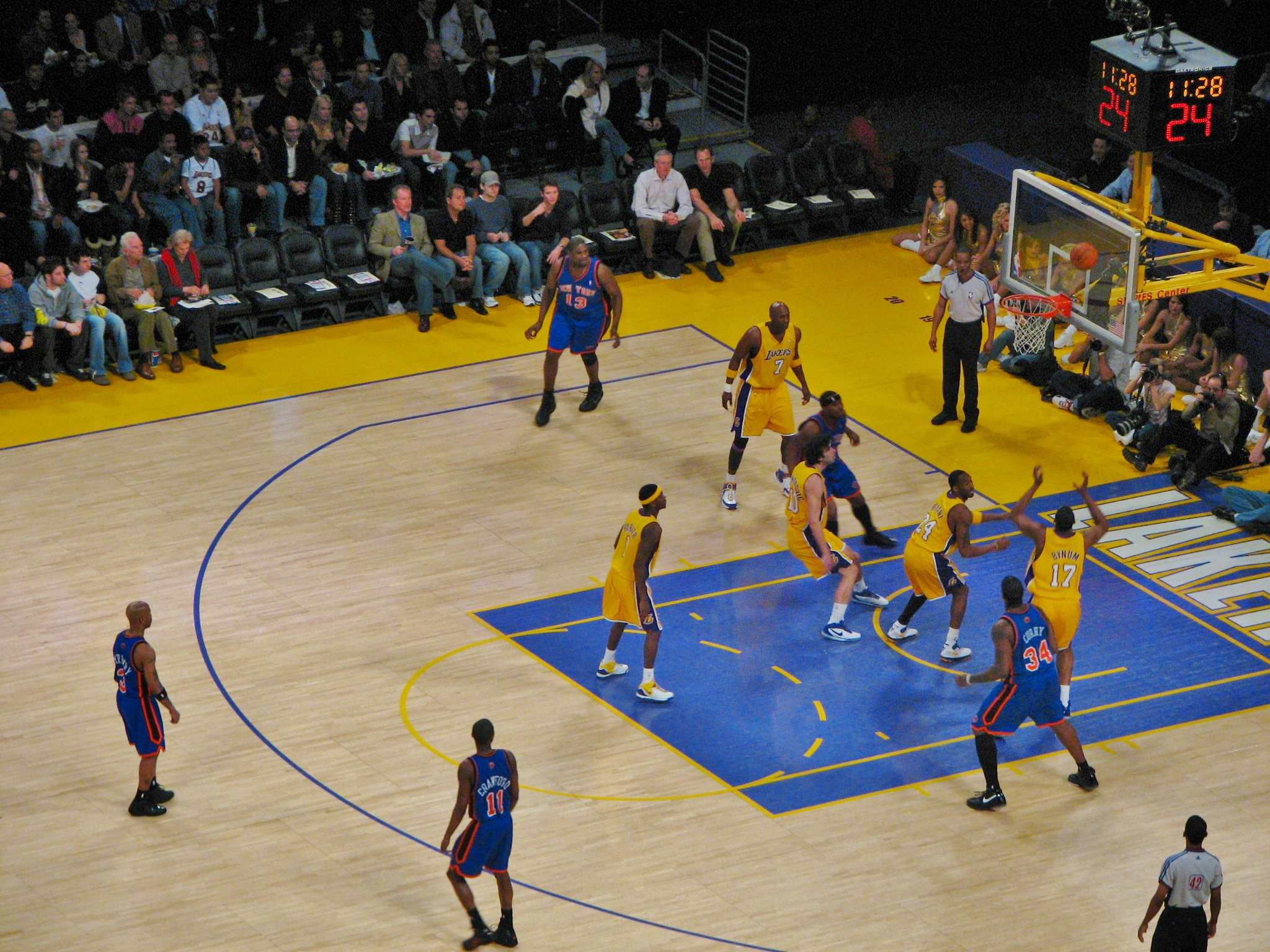
New York Knicks at Los Angeles Lakers game in 2007

The 2006–07 New York Knicks season was the 61st season for the team in the National Basketball Association (NBA). During the off-season, the Knicks hired general manager Isiah Thomas as head coach. The team finished with a 33–49 record, which placed them fourth in the Atlantic Division. For the third consecutive season, New York did not make the NBA Playoffs. Eddy Curry led the team with 19.5 points per game, while Jamal Crawford averaged 17.6 points per game, and Stephon Marbury provided them with 16.4 points and 5.4 assists per game. Second-year forward David Lee played a sixth man role off the bench, averaging 10.7 points and leading the team with 10.4 rebounds per game. Following the season, Steve Francis signed as a free agent with his former team, the Houston Rockets.

This season featured a fight between the Knicks and the Denver Nuggets on December 16, 2006. Among the players involved was Carmelo Anthony, who was leading the league in scoring at the time of the brawl. He was suspended for the next 15 games.

== Draft picks ==
Round	Pick	Player	Position	Nationality	School/Club team
1	20	Renaldo Balkman	Forward	United States	South Carolina
1	29	Mardy Collins	Guard	United States	Temple

The Knicks had previously sent the rights to their 2006 1st round pick to the Chicago Bulls alongside the option to swap 2007 draft spots in a deal involving Eddy Curry and Michael Sweetney. Chicago would go on to forward the pick – which landed at number two overall – to the Portland Trail Blazers, who came away with LaMarcus Aldridge.

== Roster ==
New York Knicks roster
Players

Pos.	No.	Player	Height	Weight	DOB	From
F	32	Renaldo Balkman	6 ft 8 in (2.03 m)	208 lb (94 kg)		South Carolina
C	26	Kelvin Cato	6 ft 11 in (2.11 m)	255 lb (116 kg)		Iowa State
G	25	Mardy Collins	6 ft 6 in (1.98 m)	220 lb (100 kg)		Temple
G	11	Jamal Crawford	6 ft 6 in (1.98 m)	185 lb (84 kg)		Michigan
C	34	Eddy Curry	7 ft 0 in (2.13 m)	285 lb (129 kg)		Thornwood HS (IL)
G	1	Steve Francis	6 ft 3 in (1.91 m)	195 lb (88 kg)		Maryland
F	7	Channing Frye	7 ft 0 in (2.13 m)	248 lb (112 kg)		Arizona
C	13	Jerome James	7 ft 0 in (2.13 m)	300 lb (136 kg)		Florida A&M
F	20	Jared Jeffries	6 ft 11 in (2.11 m)	230 lb (104 kg)		Indiana
F	42	David Lee	6 ft 9 in (2.06 m)	249 lb (113 kg)		Florida
G	3	Stephon Marbury	6 ft 2 in (1.88 m)	180 lb (82 kg)		Georgia Tech
C	5	Randolph Morris	6 ft 10 in (2.08 m)	266 lb (121 kg)		Kentucky
G	23	Quentin Richardson	6 ft 6 in (1.98 m)	223 lb (101 kg)		DePaul
G	4	Nate Robinson	5 ft 9 in (1.75 m)	180 lb (82 kg)		Washington
F	31	Malik Rose	6 ft 7 in (2.01 m)	250 lb (113 kg)		Drexel

Coaches
Head coach
- Isiah Thomas (Indiana)
Assistant(s)
- Mark Aguirre (DePaul)
- George Glymph (Benedict)
- Dave Hanners (North Carolina)
- Herb Williams (Ohio State)
- Brendan Suhr (Montclair State)

Legend
- (DP) Unsigned draft pick
- (FA) Free agent
- (S) Suspended
- Injured

== Regular season ==
=== Season standings ===
Atlantic Division	W	L	PCT	GB	Home	Road	Div
y-Toronto Raptors	47	35	.573	-	30–11	17–24	11–5
x-New Jersey Nets	41	41	.500	6	24–17	17–24	10–6
Philadelphia 76ers	35	47	.427	12	21–20	14–27	9–7
New York Knicks	33	49	.402	14	19–22	14–27	3–13
Boston Celtics	24	58	.293	23	12–29	12–29	7–9

#	Eastern Conference				
#	Team	W	L	PCT	GB
1	c-Detroit Pistons	53	29	.646	–
2	x-Cleveland Cavaliers	50	32	.610	3
3	y-Toronto Raptors	47	35	.573	6
4	y-Miami Heat	44	38	.537	9
5	x-Chicago Bulls	49	33	.598	4
6	x-New Jersey Nets	41	41	.500	12
7	x-Washington Wizards	41	41	.500	12
8	x-Orlando Magic	40	42	.488	13
9	Philadelphia 76ers	35	47	.427	18
10	Indiana Pacers	35	47	.427	18
11	New York Knicks	33	49	.402	20
12	Charlotte Bobcats	33	49	.402	20
13	Atlanta Hawks	30	52	.366	23
14	Milwaukee Bucks	28	54	.341	25
15	Boston Celtics	24	58	.293	29

== Player statistics ==
Legend
GP	Games played	GS	Games started	MPG	Minutes per game
FG%	Field-goal percentage	3P%	3-point field-goal percentage	FT%	Free-throw percentage
RPG	Rebounds per game	APG	Assists per game	SPG	Steals per game
BPG	Blocks per game	PPG	Points per game

=== Regular season ===
Player	GP	GS	MPG	FG%	3P%	FT%	RPG	APG	SPG	BPG	PPG
Renaldo Balkman	68	1	15.6	.505	.185	.567	4.3	.6	.8	.6	4.9
Kelvin Cato	18	0	5.3	.318	.	.667	1.7	.0	.2	.6	1.2
Mardy Collins	52	9	14.9	.382	.277	.585	2.0	1.6	.6	.1	4.5
Jamal Crawford	59	36	37.3	.400	.320	.838	3.2	4.4	1.0	.1	17.6
Eddy Curry	81	81	35.2	.576	1.000	.615	7.0	.8	.4	.5	19.5
Steve Francis	44	30	28.1	.408	.378	.829	3.6	3.9	.9	.3	11.3
Channing Frye	72	59	26.3	.433	.167	.787	5.5	.9	.5	.6	9.5
Jerome James	41	11	6.7	.418	.	.556	1.6	.1	.1	.4	1.9
Jared Jeffries	55	43	23.8	.461	.100	.456	4.3	1.2	.8	.5	4.1
David Lee	55	43	29.8	.600	.	.815	10.4	1.8	.8	.4	10.7
Stephon Marbury	74	74	37.1	.415	.357	.769	2.9	5.4	1.0	.1	16.4
Randolph Morris	5	0	8.8	.167	.	.333	1.8	.2	.4	.2	.8
Quentin Richardson	49	47	33.1	.418	.376	.692	7.2	2.2	.7	.1	13.0
Nate Robinson	64	5	21.2	.434	.390	.777	2.4	1.4	.8	.1	10.1
Malik Rose	65	2	12.5	.398	.250	.808	2.7	1.0	.4	.1	3.0

== See also ==
- 2006–07 NBA season
