= 2006–07 Atlanta Hawks season =

Season of National Basketball Association team the Atlanta Hawks

- Head coach: Mike Woodson
- Owners: Atlanta Spirit LLC
- Arena: Philips Arena

Results
- Record: 30–52 (.366)
- Place: Division: 5th (Southeast); Conference: 13th (Eastern)
- Playoff finish: Did not qualify
- Stats at Basketball Reference

Local media
- Television: FSN South; SportSouth
- Radio: WGST

The 2006–07 Atlanta Hawks season was the 58th season for the Atlanta Hawks in the National Basketball Association, and their 39th season in Atlanta, Georgia.

== Season summary ==
=== Off-season ===
The Hawks received the fifth overall pick in the 2006 NBA draft, and selected power forward Shelden Williams out of Duke University. During the off-season, the team signed free agents Speedy Claxton, and former Hawks center Lorenzen Wright.

=== Regular season ===
With the addition of Shelden Williams, Claxton and Wright, the Hawks got off to a strong start by winning four of their first five games of the regular season. However, after an 8–9 start to the season, the team struggled losing 12 of their next 13 games, including an eight-game losing streak between December and January. The Hawks posted a winning record above .500 in winning percentage in January with an 8–7 record during that month, and later on held a 21–31 record at the All-Star break. In February, the team re-acquired former Hawks guard Anthony Johnson from the Dallas Mavericks; it was his third stint with the team. The Hawks struggled posting a six-game losing streak between February and March, and then posting a seven-game losing streak between March and April, finishing in last place in the Southeast Division with a 30–52 record; the team missed the NBA playoffs for the eighth consecutive year.

Joe Johnson averaged 25.0 points and 4.4 assists per game, and led the Hawks with 119 three-point field-goals, but only played 57 games due to a season-ending calf injury, while Josh Smith continued to showed improvement averaging 16.4 points, 8.6 rebounds, 1.4 steals and 2.9 blocks per game, and second-year forward Marvin Williams provided the team with 13.1 points and 5.3 rebounds per game in 64 games. In addition, sixth man Josh Childress provided with 13.0 points and 6.2 rebounds per game, but only played 55 games due to injury, while Zaza Pachulia averaged 12.2 points and 6.9 rebounds per game, and Tyronn Lue contributed 11.4 points and 3.6 assists per game in 56 games. Meanwhile, second-year guard Salim Stoudamire contributed 7.7 points per game, Anthony Johnson provided with 7.5 points and 4.6 assists per game in 27 games after the trade, and Shelden Williams averaged 5.5 points and 5.4 rebounds per game. Claxton contributed 5.3 points, 4.4 assists and 1.7 steals per game, but only appeared in just 42 games due to injury, and Wright provided with 2.6 points and 3.2 rebounds per game.

During the NBA All-Star weekend at the Thomas & Mack Center in Las Vegas, Nevada, Joe Johnson was selected for the 2007 NBA All-Star Game, as a member of the Eastern Conference All-Star team; it was his first ever All-Star appearance. Smith finished tied in 21st place in Defensive Player of the Year voting, and also finished tied in 21st place in Most Improved Player voting, while Childress finished tied in eleventh place in Sixth Man of the Year voting.

The Hawks finished 26th in the NBA in home-game attendance, with an attendance of 639,375 at the Philips Arena during the regular season, which was the fifth-lowest in the league.

=== Aftermath ===
This would be the final season in which the Hawks missed the NBA playoffs until the 2017–18 season.

== Draft picks ==
Round	Pick	Player	Position	Nationality	College
1	5	Shelden Williams	PF	United States	Duke
2	33	Solomon Jones	PF/C	United States	South Florida

== Roster ==
Atlanta Hawks roster
Players

Pos.	No.	Player	Height	Weight	DOB	From
PF	11	Esteban Batista	6 ft 10 in (2.08 m)	270 lb (122 kg)		Uruguay
SF	1	Josh Childress	6 ft 8 in (2.03 m)	210 lb (95 kg)		Stanford
PG	12	Speedy Claxton (injured)	5 ft 11 in (1.80 m)	166 lb (75 kg)		Hofstra
PG	36	Royal Ivey	6 ft 4 in (1.93 m)	215 lb (98 kg)		Texas
PG	8	Anthony Johnson	6 ft 3 in (1.91 m)	190 lb (86 kg)		College of Charleston
SG	2	Joe Johnson (injured)	6 ft 7 in (2.01 m)	240 lb (109 kg)		Arkansas
PF	44	Solomon Jones	6 ft 10 in (2.08 m)	230 lb (104 kg)		South Florida
PG	10	Tyronn Lue	6 ft 0 in (1.83 m)	175 lb (79 kg)		Nebraska
PF	14	Slava Medvedenko	6 ft 10 in (2.08 m)	250 lb (113 kg)		Ukraine
C	27	Zaza Pachulia	6 ft 11 in (2.11 m)	275 lb (125 kg)		Republic of Georgia
SF	5	Josh Smith	6 ft 9 in (2.06 m)	225 lb (102 kg)		Oak Hill Academy (HS)
SG	20	Salim Stoudamire	6 ft 1 in (1.85 m)	190 lb (86 kg)		Arizona
SF	24	Marvin Williams	6 ft 9 in (2.06 m)	237 lb (108 kg)		North Carolina
PF	33	Shelden Williams	6 ft 9 in (2.06 m)	250 lb (113 kg)		Duke
C	42	Lorenzen Wright	6 ft 11 in (2.11 m)	225 lb (102 kg)		Memphis

Coaches
Head coach
- Mike Woodson (Indiana)
Assistant(s)
- Greg Ballard (Oregon)
- Bob Bender (Duke)
- Herb Brown (Vermont)
- Larry Drew (Missouri)
- David Fizdale (San Diego)

Legend
- (DP) Unsigned draft pick
- (FA) Free agent
- (S) Suspended
- Injured

Roster

== Regular season ==
=== Standings ===
Southeast Division	W	L	PCT	GB	Home	Road	Div
y-Miami Heat	44	38	.537	-	27–14	17–24	9–7
x-Washington Wizards	41	41	.500	3	26–15	15–26	8–8
x-Orlando Magic	40	42	.488	4	25–16	15–26	9–7
Charlotte Bobcats	33	49	.402	11	20–21	13–28	9–7
Atlanta Hawks	30	52	.366	14	18–23	12–29	5–11

#	Eastern Conference				
#	Team	W	L	PCT	GB
1	c-Detroit Pistons	53	29	.646	–
2	x-Cleveland Cavaliers	50	32	.610	3
3	y-Toronto Raptors	47	35	.573	6
4	y-Miami Heat	44	38	.537	9
5	x-Chicago Bulls	49	33	.598	4
6	x-New Jersey Nets	41	41	.500	12
7	x-Washington Wizards	41	41	.500	12
8	x-Orlando Magic	40	42	.488	13
9	Philadelphia 76ers	35	47	.427	18
10	Indiana Pacers	35	47	.427	18
11	New York Knicks	33	49	.402	20
12	Charlotte Bobcats	33	49	.402	20
13	Atlanta Hawks	30	52	.366	23
14	Milwaukee Bucks	28	54	.341	25
15	Boston Celtics	24	58	.293	29

=== Season ===
Player	GP	GS	MPG	FG%	3P%	FT%	RPG	APG	SPG	BPG	PPG
Esteban Batista	13	0	6.2	.500	.	.571	2.3	.3	.2	.0	1.5
Cedric Bozeman	23	5	8.7	.282	.154	.333	1.0	.4	.2	.1	1.1
Josh Childress	55	13	36.8	.504	.338	.795	6.2	2.3	1.1	.7	13.0
Speedy Claxton	42	31	25.1	.327	.214	.550	1.9	4.4	1.7	.1	5.3
Matt Freije	19	0	7.7	.296	.136	.833	1.3	.4	.2	.1	2.1
Royal Ivey	53	18	10.2	.448	.313	.686	1.0	.8	.5	.1	3.0
Anthony Johnson	27	17	27.4	.416	.318	.781	2.0	4.6	.6	.1	7.5
Joe Johnson	57	57	41.4	.471	.381	.748	4.2	4.4	1.1	.2	25.0
Solomon Jones	58	8	11.5	.508	.000	.787	2.3	.2	.2	.7	3.3
Tyronn Lue	56	17	26.6	.416	.348	.883	1.9	3.6	.4	.0	11.4
Stanislav Medvedenko	14	0	5.8	.414	.500	.850	1.0	.1	.0	.1	3.0
Zaza Pachulia	72	47	28.1	.474	.000	.786	6.9	1.5	1.1	.5	12.2
Jeremy Richardson	5	0	3.8	.500	.667	.	.4	.0	.2	.0	1.6
Josh Smith	72	72	36.8	.439	.250	.693	8.6	3.3	1.4	2.9	16.4
Salim Stoudamire	61	0	17.0	.416	.361	.897	1.2	1.0	.3	.0	7.7
Dijon Thompson	6	0	8.3	.400	.000	.833	1.3	.3	.0	.0	2.8
Marvin Williams	64	63	34.0	.433	.244	.815	5.3	1.9	.8	.5	13.1
Shelden Williams	81	31	18.7	.455	.500	.764	5.4	.5	.6	.5	5.5
Lorenzen Wright	67	31	15.4	.448	.	.281	3.2	.6	.4	.4	2.6

Player statistics citation:
