= 2006–07 Detroit Pistons season =

NBA team season

- Division champions
- Head coach: Flip Saunders
- President: Joe Dumars
- General manager: Joe Dumars
- Owner: Bill Davidson
- Arena: The Palace of Auburn Hills

Results
- Record: 53–29 (.646)
- Place: Division: 1st (Central); Conference: 1st (Eastern)
- Playoff finish: Eastern Conference Finals (lost to Cavaliers 2–4)
- Stats at Basketball Reference

Local media
- Television: FSN Detroit; WMYD
- Radio: WDFN

The 2006–07 Detroit Pistons season was the 66th season of the franchise, the 59th in the National Basketball Association (NBA), and the 50th in the Detroit area. The Pistons began the season hoping to improve upon their 64–18 output from the previous season. However, they came eleven wins shy of tying it, finishing 53–29. Whatsoever, these were enough wins to lead the conference at 1st in a lackluster east. After signing Nazr Mohammed and hometown native Chris Webber to offset the loss of Ben Wallace during the off-season, the Pistons were able to reach the Eastern Conference finals for the fifth consecutive season, becoming the first team since the 1992–93 Chicago Bulls to do so. In the Eastern Conference finals, they were defeated by the eventual Eastern Conference champion Cleveland Cavaliers in six games. The Pistons had the sixth best team defensive rating in the NBA. Following the season, Webber was released.

== Draft picks ==
Round	Pick	Player	Position	Nationality	College
2	60	Will Blalock	PG	United States	Iowa State

== Roster ==
2006–07 Detroit Pistons roster
Players

Pos.	No.	Player	Height	Weight	DOB	From
PG	1	Chauncey Billups	6 ft 3 in (1.91 m)	202 lb (92 kg)	1976-09-25	Colorado
PG	8	Will Blalock (DL)	6 ft 0 in (1.83 m)	205 lb (93 kg)	1983-09-08	Iowa State
C	34	Dale Davis	6 ft 11 in (2.11 m)	230 lb (104 kg)	1969-03-25	Clemson
SG	20	Carlos Delfino	6 ft 6 in (1.98 m)	230 lb (104 kg)	1982-08-29	Argentina
SF	12	Ronald Dupree	6 ft 7 in (2.01 m)	209 lb (95 kg)	1981-01-26	LSU
SG	32	Richard Hamilton	6 ft 6 in (1.98 m)	185 lb (84 kg)	1978-02-14	Connecticut
PG	10	Lindsey Hunter	6 ft 2 in (1.88 m)	170 lb (77 kg)	1970-12-03	Jackson State
PF	25	Amir Johnson (DL)	6 ft 9 in (2.06 m)	210 lb (95 kg)	1987-05-01	Westchester HS (CA)
C	54	Jason Maxiell	6 ft 7 in (2.01 m)	260 lb (118 kg)	1983-02-18	Cincinnati
PF	24	Antonio McDyess	6 ft 9 in (2.06 m)	220 lb (100 kg)	1974-09-07	Alabama
C	13	Nazr Mohammed	6 ft 10 in (2.08 m)	221 lb (100 kg)	1977-09-05	Kentucky
SG	6	Flip Murray	6 ft 4 in (1.93 m)	190 lb (86 kg)	1979-07-29	Shaw
SF	22	Tayshaun Prince	6 ft 9 in (2.06 m)	215 lb (98 kg)	1980-02-28	Kentucky
C	30	Rasheed Wallace	6 ft 10 in (2.08 m)	225 lb (102 kg)	1974-09-17	North Carolina
PF	84	Chris Webber	6 ft 9 in (2.06 m)	245 lb (111 kg)	1973-03-01	Michigan

Coaches
Head coach
- Flip Saunders
Assistant(s)
- Ron Harper
- Igor Kokoškov
- Don Zierden
- Mike Abdenour (trainer)

Legend
- (DP) Unsigned draft pick
- (FA) Free agent
- (S) Suspended
- (DL) On assignment to D-League affiliate
- Injured

Roster
Updated: April 30, 2007

== Regular season ==
=== Season standings ===
Central Division	W	L	PCT	GB	Home	Road	Div
y-Detroit Pistons	53	29	.646	-	26–15	27–14	9–7
x-Cleveland Cavaliers	50	32	.610	3	30–11	20–21	10–6
x-Chicago Bulls	49	33	.598	4	31–10	18–23	12–4
Indiana Pacers	35	47	.427	18	22–19	13–28	8–8
Milwaukee Bucks	28	54	.341	25	18–23	10–31	1–15

#	Eastern Conference				
#	Team	W	L	PCT	GB
1	c-Detroit Pistons	53	29	.646	–
2	x-Cleveland Cavaliers	50	32	.610	3
3	y-Toronto Raptors	47	35	.573	6
4	y-Miami Heat	44	38	.537	9
5	x-Chicago Bulls	49	33	.598	4
6	x-New Jersey Nets	41	41	.500	12
7	x-Washington Wizards	41	41	.500	12
8	x-Orlando Magic	40	42	.488	13
9	Philadelphia 76ers	35	47	.427	18
10	Indiana Pacers	35	47	.427	18
11	New York Knicks	33	49	.402	20
12	Charlotte Bobcats	33	49	.402	20
13	Atlanta Hawks	30	52	.366	23
14	Milwaukee Bucks	28	54	.341	25
15	Boston Celtics	24	58	.293	29

== Playoffs ==
2007 playoff game log
First Round: 4–0 (home: 2–0; road: 2–0)

Game	Date	Team	Score	High points	High rebounds	High assists	Location Attendance	Series
1	April 21	Orlando	W 100–92	Hamilton, Billups (22)	Antonio McDyess (9)	Chauncey Billups (11)	The Palace of Auburn Hills; 22,076	1–0
2	April 23	Orlando	W 98–90	Richard Hamilton (22)	Rasheed Wallace (11)	Chauncey Billups (8)	The Palace of Auburn Hills; 22,076	2–0
3	April 26	@ Orlando	W 93–77	Tayshaun Prince (23)	Antonio McDyess (11)	Tayshaun Prince (5)	Amway Arena; 17,451	3–0
4	April 28	@ Orlando	W 97–93	Chauncey Billups (25)	Chris Webber (10)	Chauncey Billups (6)	Amway Arena; 17,451	4–0

Conference Semifinals: 4–2 (home: 2–1; road: 2–1)

Game	Date	Team	Score	High points	High rebounds	High assists	Location Attendance	Series
1	May 5	Chicago	W 95–69	Hamilton, Billups (20)	Antonio McDyess (10)	Lindsey Hunter (6)	The Palace of Auburn Hills; 22,076	1–0
2	May 7	Chicago	W 108–87	Tayshaun Prince (25)	Richard Hamilton (9)	Chauncey Billups (10)	The Palace of Auburn Hills; 22,076	2–0
3	May 10	@ Chicago	W 81–74	Tayshaun Prince (23)	Prince, R. Wallace (11)	Chauncey Billups (7)	United Center; 23,462	3–0
4	May 13	@ Chicago	L 87–102	Chauncey Billups (23)	Antonio McDyess (8)	Chauncey Billups (8)	United Center; 23,099	3–1
5	May 15	Chicago	L 92–108	Chauncey Billups (17)	Chris Webber (8)	Chauncey Billups (6)	The Palace of Auburn Hills; 22,076	3–2
6	May 17	@ Chicago	W 95–85	Richard Hamilton (23)	Rasheed Wallace (13)	Chauncey Billups (7)	United Center; 23,030	4–2

Conference Finals: 2–4 (home: 2–1; road: 0–3)

Game	Date	Team	Score	High points	High rebounds	High assists	Location Attendance	Series
1	May 21	Cleveland	W 79–76	Richard Hamilton (24)	Rasheed Wallace (12)	Tayshaun Prince (9)	The Palace of Auburn Hills; 22,076	1–0
2	May 24	Cleveland	W 79–76	Rasheed Wallace (16)	Rasheed Wallace (11)	Chauncey Billups (6)	The Palace of Auburn Hills; 22,076	2–0
3	May 27	@ Cleveland	L 82–88	Rasheed Wallace (16)	Antonio McDyess (9)	three players tied (3)	Quicken Loans Arena; 20,562	2–1
4	May 29	@ Cleveland	L 87–91	Chauncey Billups (23)	Chauncey Billups (9)	Tayshaun Prince (4)	Quicken Loans Arena; 20,562	2–2
5	May 31	Cleveland	L 107–109 (2OT)	Richard Hamilton (26)	Tayshaun Prince (9)	Richard Hamilton (5)	The Palace of Auburn Hills; 22,076	2–3
6	June 2	@ Cleveland	L 82–98	Richard Hamilton (29)	three players tied (6)	Tayshaun Prince (6)	Quicken Loans Arena; 20,562	2–4

2007 schedule

== Player statistics ==
Legend
GP	Games played	GS	Games started	MPG	Minutes per game
FG%	Field-goal percentage	3P%	3-point field-goal percentage	FT%	Free-throw percentage
RPG	Rebounds per game	APG	Assists per game	SPG	Steals per game
BPG	Blocks per game	PPG	Points per game

=== Regular season ===
Player	GP	GS	MPG	FG%	3P%	FT%	RPG	APG	SPG	BPG	PPG
Chauncey Billups	70	70	36.2	.427	.345	.883	3.4	7.2	1.2	.2	17.0
Will Blalock	14	0	11.9	.300	.200	1.000	1.1	1.2	.4	.0	1.8
Dale Davis	46	6	10.1	.446	.	.654	3.0	.3	.2	.7	1.8
Carlos Delfino	82	1	16.7	.415	.333	.787	3.2	1.1	.6	.1	5.2
Ronald Dupree	19	0	4.9	.355	.	.333	.9	.3	.3	.1	1.3
Richard Hamilton	75	75	36.8	.468	.341	.861	3.8	3.8	.8	.2	19.8
Lindsey Hunter	52	0	14.3	.385	.319	.909	.9	1.8	.7	.1	4.9
Amir Johnson	8	0	15.5	.545	.000	.786	4.6	.4	.6	1.6	5.9
Jason Maxiell	67	8	14.1	.500	.	.526	2.8	.2	.4	.9	5.0
Antonio McDyess	82	3	21.1	.526	.	.691	6.0	.9	.7	.8	8.1
Nazr Mohammed	51	33	15.2	.532	.	.610	4.5	.2	.5	.8	5.6
Ronald Murray	69	18	21.4	.404	.289	.725	1.6	2.7	.7	.2	6.7
Tayshaun Prince	82	82	36.6	.460	.386	.768	5.2	2.8	.6	.7	14.3
Rasheed Wallace	75	72	32.3	.423	.351	.788	7.2	1.7	1.0	1.6	12.3
Chris Webber	43	42	29.7	.489	.333	.636	6.7	3.0	1.0	.6	11.3

=== Playoffs ===
Player	GP	GS	MPG	FG%	3P%	FT%	RPG	APG	SPG	BPG	PPG
Chauncey Billups	16	16	40.6	.435	.389	.832	3.3	5.7	1.2	.1	18.6
Dale Davis	8	0	6.4	.375	.	.500	1.5	.1	.3	.3	1.0
Carlos Delfino	16	0	8.4	.405	.188	.667	1.3	.5	.3	.1	2.3
Richard Hamilton	16	16	39.9	.429	.400	.865	4.3	3.8	.9	.1	18.8
Lindsey Hunter	13	0	10.2	.226	.222	1.000	.8	1.2	.5	.1	1.8
Jason Maxiell	14	0	10.4	.667	.000	.522	2.4	.1	.3	.6	4.0
Antonio McDyess	16	0	22.1	.349	.000	.731	7.1	1.1	.7	.9	5.8
Nazr Mohammed	2	0	3.0	.500	.	1.000	1.5	.0	.0	.0	2.5
Ronald Murray	12	0	11.3	.355	.000	.727	.8	1.2	.3	.1	2.5
Tayshaun Prince	16	16	41.6	.415	.409	.759	6.4	3.8	.9	.3	14.1
Rasheed Wallace	16	16	35.8	.437	.347	.842	7.7	1.8	1.2	1.8	14.3
Chris Webber	16	16	25.3	.524	.000	.531	6.3	1.5	.9	.6	9.9

== Awards and records ==
- Chauncey Billups, All-NBA Third Team
- Tayshaun Prince, NBA All-Defensive Second Team
