= Jake Voskuhl =

American basketball player (born 1977)

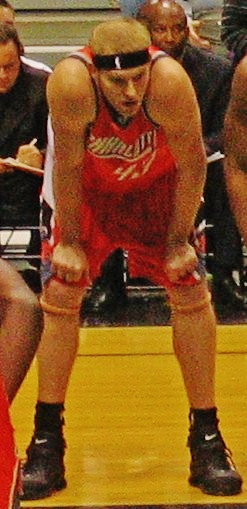

Personal information
- Born: November 1, 1977 (age 49) Tulsa, Oklahoma, U.S.
- Listed height: 6 ft 11 in (2.11 m)
- Listed weight: 255 lb (116 kg)

Career information
- High school: Strake Jesuit College Prep (Houston, Texas)
- College: UConn (1996–2000)
- NBA draft: 2000: 2nd round, 33rd overall pick
- Drafted by: Chicago Bulls
- Playing career: 2000–2011
- Position: Center
- Number: 43, 77

Career history
- 2000–2001: Chicago Bulls
- 2001–2005: Phoenix Suns
- 2005–2007: Charlotte Bobcats
- 2007–2008: Milwaukee Bucks
- 2008–2009: Toronto Raptors
- 2011: Metros de Santiago

Career highlights
- NCAA champion (1999)
- Stats at NBA.com
- Stats at Basketball Reference

Robert Jacob Voskuhl (born November 1, 1977) is an American former professional basketball player.

After attending Strake Jesuit College Preparatory, Voskuhl went to the University of Connecticut from 1996 to 2000, where he was the starting center on the school's 1999 NCAA National Championship team. The squad also featured former NBA star Richard "Rip" Hamilton. He became a member of the Pi Kappa Alpha fraternity while an undergraduate.

== Professional career ==
=== Chicago Bulls (2000–2001) ===
Voskuhl was drafted by the Chicago Bulls with the 33rd overall pick of the 2000 NBA draft, he only played 16 games in his rookie season, averaging 1.9 points and 2.1 rebounds per game. The Bulls were in a rebuilding era and were looking for young players to revitalize the franchise; Voskuhl had a good opportunity to become a key young role player on the team, however he didn't receive valuable minutes on the court and the Bulls would be an abysmal team until the 2004–2005 season. After just one season with the team, the Bulls let him go.

=== Phoenix Suns (2001–2005) ===
Voskuhl was traded to the Phoenix Suns in the 2001 offseason, and got considerably more playing time in 2001–02, as he played 59 games and averaged 5.0 points and 4.2 rebounds per game. The Suns were also rebuilding, however they managed to become successful in a short amount of time. The Suns made the playoffs in the 2002–2003 season which happened to be Voskuhl's first playoff appearance. The Suns lost to the San Antonio Spurs in 6 games. The Suns managed to acquire superstar point guard Steve Nash in the 2004 off season, and immediately became an elite team. In that season the Suns finished 62–20 which was the best recording in the Western Conference. Steve Nash won the MVP that season and overall the 2004–2005 season was Voskuhl's most successful season with any team. The Suns made a deep playoff push, however once again lost to the rival San Antonio Spurs in 5 games. After the season Voskuhl wouldn't make the playoffs in his career ever again. Overall, he played four years with the Suns, posting career-best averages in his third year with the team (6.6 ppg, 5.2 rpg).

=== Charlotte Bobcats (2005–2007) ===
On August 2, 2005, Voskuhl was traded to the Charlotte Bobcats for a conditional second-round draft pick. In the 2006–07 season he saw more playing time than expected due to the exhaustion of Primož Brezec, and averaged 4.4 points per game. However Voskuhl's situation with the Bobcats was very similar to his situation with the Chicago Bulls. The team was rebuilding and wouldn't make the playoffs until a few years after Voskuhl's departure.

=== Milwaukee Bucks (2007–2008) ===
Prior to the 2007–08 season, Milwaukee signed Voskuhl to a one-year, $3 million deal, as he battled for backup center to Andrew Bogut with Dan Gadzuric. His points and rebounds average was the same for the season: he averaged 2.2 points per game and 2.2 rebounds per game.

=== Toronto Raptors (2008–2009) ===
On December 14, 2008, Voskuhl signed with the Toronto Raptors. He played 38 games for the team and his production on the court decreased. Voskuhl's final NBA game would be during his tenure as a Raptor on April 15, 2009, in a 109–98 over the Chicago Bulls. In his final game, he recorded 2 points and 1 rebound.

=== Los Angeles Clippers (2010) ===
He signed with the Mavericks in 2009, but did not make their final roster. He ended up missing the entire 2009–2010 season. On September 27, 2010, Voskuhl was signed to a non-guaranteed deal by the Los Angeles Clippers. He was waived on October 25.

=== Detroit Pistons (2011) ===
On December 12, 2011, Voskuhl signed as a free agent with the Detroit Pistons. However 9 days later on December 21 he was waived. At 34 years old Voskuhl's career was over and he never returned to the NBA.

== Personal life ==
Voskuhl and ex-wife Jennifer Voskuhl have four daughters, Zoie, Skylar, Daisy, Shayne, and a son, Gage. He wears a size 17 sneaker.

He is a born-again Christian.

== NBA career statistics ==
Legend
GP	Games played	GS	Games started	MPG	Minutes per game
FG%	Field goal percentage	3P%	3-point field goal percentage	FT%	Free throw percentage
RPG	Rebounds per game	APG	Assists per game	SPG	Steals per game
BPG	Blocks per game	PPG	Points per game	**Bold**	Career high

=== Regular season ===
Year	Team	GP	GS	MPG	FG%	3P%	FT%	RPG	APG	SPG	BPG	PPG
2000–01	Chicago	16	2	8.9	.440	.000	.571	2.1	.3	.3	.4	1.9
2001–02	Phoenix	59	34	15.3	.554	.000	.752	4.2	.3	.2	.4	5.0
2002–03	Phoenix	65	1	14.6	**.564**	.000	.667	3.5	.6	.3	.4	3.8
2003–04	Phoenix	66	**43**	**24.3**	.507	.000	.740	**5.2**	**.9**	**.6**	.4	**6.6**
2004–05	Phoenix	38	1	9.5	.458	.000	.684	2.4	.4	.1	.3	2.1
2005–06	Charlotte	51	2	16.0	.437	**.333**	.683	3.6	.8	.5	**.5**	5.3
2006–07	Charlotte	**73**	9	14.3	.475	.000	.681	3.5	.6	.4	.3	4.4
2007–08	Milwaukee	44	0	8.8	.463	.000	**.828**	2.2	.3	.2	**.5**	2.2
2008–09	Toronto	38	1	6.3	.267	.000	.786	1.6	.2	.1	.1	.9
Career		450	93	14.3	.487	.333	.714	3.4	.5	.3	.4	4.0

=== Playoffs ===
Year	Team	GP	GS	MPG	FG%	3P%	FT%	RPG	APG	SPG	BPG	PPG
2003	Phoenix	6	0	16.3	.706	.000	.923	3.7	.3	.7	.7	6.0
Career		6	0	16.3	.706	.000	.923	3.7	.3	.7	.7	6.0
