= 2006–07 Orlando Magic season =

18th season for the Orlando Magic

- Head coach: Brian Hill
- President: Bob Vander Weide
- General manager: Otis Smith
- Owner: Richard DeVos
- Arena: Amway Arena

Results
- Record: 40–42 (.488)
- Place: Division: 3rd (Southeast); Conference: 8th (Eastern)
- Playoff finish: First Round (lost to Pistons 0–4)

Local media
- Television: FSN Florida, Sun Sports, WRBW
- Radio: WDBO

The 2006–07 Orlando Magic season was the team's 18th in the NBA. They began the season hoping to improve upon their 36–46 output from the previous season. They best it by four wins, finishing 40–42, qualifying for the playoffs. A four-game sweep to the Detroit Pistons in the opening round eliminated the Magic from the playoffs. Following the season, Grant Hill signed as a free agent with the Phoenix Suns and Brian Hill was fired again.

== Draft picks ==
Round	Pick	Player	Position	Nationality	College / Club
1	11	JJ Redick	SG	United States	Duke
2	41	James Augustine	PF	United States	Illinois
2	44	Lior Eliyahu	PF	Israel	Hapoel Galil Elyon (Israel)

== Roster ==
2006–07 Orlando Magic roster
Players

Pos.	No.	Player	Height	Weight	DOB	From
G/F	1	Trevor Ariza	6 ft 8 in (2.03 m)	200 lb (91 kg)	1985-06-30	UCLA
G	30	Carlos Arroyo	6 ft 2 in (1.88 m)	202 lb (92 kg)	1979-07-30	FIU
F	40	James Augustine	6 ft 10 in (2.08 m)	235 lb (107 kg)	1984-02-27	Illinois
F/C	4	Tony Battie	6 ft 11 in (2.11 m)	230 lb (104 kg)	1976-02-11	Texas Tech
G	10	Keith Bogans	6 ft 5 in (1.96 m)	215 lb (98 kg)	1980-05-12	Kentucky
G	34	Travis Diener	6 ft 1 in (1.85 m)	175 lb (79 kg)	1982-03-01	Marquette
G	5	Keyon Dooling	6 ft 3 in (1.91 m)	196 lb (89 kg)	1980-05-08	Missouri
F	8	Pat Garrity	6 ft 9 in (2.06 m)	238 lb (108 kg)	1976-08-03	Notre Dame
F	33	Grant Hill	6 ft 8 in (2.03 m)	225 lb (102 kg)	1972-10-05	Duke
C	12	Dwight Howard	6 ft 11 in (2.11 m)	240 lb (109 kg)	1985-12-08	SW Atlanta Christian Academy HS (GA)
F	31	Darko Miličić	7 ft 0 in (2.13 m)	250 lb (113 kg)	1985-06-20	Serbia
G	14	Jameer Nelson	6 ft 0 in (1.83 m)	190 lb (86 kg)	1982-02-09	Saint Joseph's
F	45	Bo Outlaw	6 ft 8 in (2.03 m)	210 lb (95 kg)	1971-04-13	Houston
G	7	JJ Redick	6 ft 4 in (1.93 m)	190 lb (86 kg)	1984-06-24	Duke
F	15	Hedo Türkoğlu	6 ft 10 in (2.08 m)	220 lb (100 kg)	1979-03-19	Turkey

Coaches
Head coach
- Brian Hill
Assistant(s)
- Randy Ayers
- Mark Bryant
- John Kuester
- Tom Sterner
- Morlon Wiley

Legend
- (DP) Unsigned draft pick
- (FA) Free agent
- (S) Suspended
- Injured

Roster
Updated: January 25, 2007

== Regular season ==
=== Season standings ===
Southeast Division	W	L	PCT	GB	Home	Road	Div
y-Miami Heat	44	38	.537	-	27–14	17–24	9–7
x-Washington Wizards	41	41	.500	3	26–15	15–26	8–8
x-Orlando Magic	40	42	.488	4	25–16	15–26	9–7
Charlotte Bobcats	33	49	.402	11	20–21	13–28	9–7
Atlanta Hawks	30	52	.366	14	18–23	12–29	5–11

#	Eastern Conference				
#	Team	W	L	PCT	GB
1	c-Detroit Pistons	53	29	.646	–
2	x-Cleveland Cavaliers	50	32	.610	3
3	y-Toronto Raptors	47	35	.573	6
4	y-Miami Heat	44	38	.537	9
5	x-Chicago Bulls	49	33	.598	4
6	x-New Jersey Nets	41	41	.500	12
7	x-Washington Wizards	41	41	.500	12
8	x-Orlando Magic	40	42	.488	13
9	Philadelphia 76ers	35	47	.427	18
10	Indiana Pacers	35	47	.427	18
11	New York Knicks	33	49	.402	20
12	Charlotte Bobcats	33	49	.402	20
13	Atlanta Hawks	30	52	.366	23
14	Milwaukee Bucks	28	54	.341	25
15	Boston Celtics	24	58	.293	29

== Playoffs ==
2007 playoff game log
First Round: 0–4 (home: 0–2; road: 0–2)

Game	Date	Team	Score	High points	High rebounds	High assists	Location Attendance	Series
1	April 21	@ Detroit	L 92–100	Hedo Türkoğlu (17)	Dwight Howard (10)	Grant Hill (5)	The Palace of Auburn Hills; 22,076	0–1
2	April 23	@ Detroit	L 90–98	Hedo Türkoğlu (22)	Dwight Howard (11)	Hill, Arroyo (4)	The Palace of Auburn Hills; 22,076	0–2
3	April 26	Detroit	L 77–93	Jameer Nelson (27)	Dwight Howard (12)	Nelson, Türkoğlu (4)	Amway Arena; 17,451	0–3
4	April 28	Detroit	L 93–97	Dwight Howard (29)	Dwight Howard (17)	Hedo Türkoğlu (5)	Amway Arena; 17,451	0–4

2007 schedule

== Player statistics ==
=== Regular season ===
Player	POS	GP	GS	MP	REB	AST	STL	BLK	PTS	MPG	RPG	APG	SPG	BPG	PPG
Dwight Howard	C	82	82	3,023	1,008	158	70	156	1,443	36.9	12.3	1.9	.9	1.9	17.6
Darko Miličić	PF	80	16	1,913	437	90	44	140	639	23.9	5.5	1.1	.6	1.8	8.0
Jameer Nelson	PG	77	77	2,331	236	330	73	5	1,000	30.3	3.1	4.3	.9	.1	13.0
Hedo Türkoğlu	SF	73	73	2,268	293	233	70	16	970	31.1	4.0	3.2	1.0	.2	13.3
Carlos Arroyo	PG	72	5	1,304	134	202	39	2	552	18.1	1.9	2.8	.5	.0	7.7
Tony Battie	PF	66	66	1,575	344	35	29	30	404	23.9	5.2	.5	.4	.5	6.1
Keyon Dooling	SG	66	2	1,435	86	112	52	15	521	21.7	1.3	1.7	.8	.2	7.9
Grant Hill	SG	65	64	2,009	237	138	61	25	934	30.9	3.6	2.1	.9	.4	14.4
Keith Bogans	SG	59	18	990	93	59	28	2	298	16.8	1.6	1.0	.5	.0	5.1
Trevor Ariza	SG	57	7	1,278	249	65	59	19	506	22.4	4.4	1.1	1.0	.3	8.9
JJ Redick	PG	42	0	622	52	36	12	0	252	14.8	1.2	.9	.3	.0	6.0
Bo Outlaw	PF	41	0	460	106	16	17	6	81	11.2	2.6	.4	.4	.1	2.0
Pat Garrity	PF	33	0	277	42	14	7	0	71	8.4	1.3	.4	.2	.0	2.2
Travis Diener	PG	26	0	288	18	35	4	0	98	11.1	.7	1.3	.2	.0	3.8
James Augustine	PF	2	0	7	3	2	0	0	2	3.5	1.5	1.0	.0	.0	1.0

=== Playoffs ===
Player	POS	GP	GS	MP	REB	AST	STL	BLK	PTS	MPG	RPG	APG	SPG	BPG	PPG
Dwight Howard	C	4	4	167	59	7	2	4	61	41.8	14.8	1.8	.5	1.0	15.3
Hedo Türkoğlu	SF	4	4	156	13	14	5	4	55	39.0	3.3	3.5	1.3	1.0	13.8
Grant Hill	SG	4	4	143	22	15	2	1	60	35.8	5.5	3.8	.5	.3	15.0
Jameer Nelson	PG	4	4	129	12	13	3	0	57	32.3	3.0	3.3	.8	.0	14.3
Tony Battie	PF	4	4	87	16	1	0	0	15	21.8	4.0	.3	.0	.0	3.8
Darko Miličić	PF	4	0	115	18	4	1	4	49	28.8	4.5	1.0	.3	1.0	12.3
Keyon Dooling	SG	4	0	65	7	5	2	1	29	16.3	1.8	1.3	.5	.3	7.3
Trevor Ariza	SG	4	0	47	9	5	1	0	11	11.8	2.3	1.3	.3	.0	2.8
Carlos Arroyo	PG	3	0	40	5	6	1	0	12	13.3	1.7	2.0	.3	.0	4.0
JJ Redick	PG	1	0	11	0	2	0	0	3	11.0	.0	2.0	.0	.0	3.0

== Awards and records ==
- Dwight Howard – All-NBA 3rd Team, All-Star
