= 2006–07 Milwaukee Bucks season =

NBA professional basketball team season

- Head coach: Terry Stotts; Larry Krystkowiak
- Owners: Herb Kohl
- Arena: Bradley Center

Results
- Record: 28–54 (.341)
- Place: Division: 5th (Central); Conference: 14th (Eastern)
- Playoff finish: Did not qualify

Local media
- Television: FSN Wisconsin, WCGV-TV
- Radio: WFMR

The 2006-07 Milwaukee Bucks season was the team's 39th in the NBA. They began the season hoping to improve upon their 40-42 output from the previous season. However, they came twelve wins shy of tying it, finishing 28–54.

== Draft picks ==
Round	Pick	Player	Position	Nationality	College
2	39	David Noel	F	United States	North Carolina

== Roster ==
2006–07 Milwaukee Bucks roster
Players

Pos.	No.	Player	Height	Weight	DOB	From
PG	42	Charlie Bell	6 ft 3 in (1.91 m)	200 lb (91 kg)	1979–03–12	Michigan State
C	6	Andrew Bogut	7 ft 0 in (2.13 m)	260 lb (118 kg)	1984–11–28	Utah
G	11	Earl Boykins	5 ft 5 in (1.65 m)	133 lb (60 kg)		Eastern Michigan
C	50	Dan Gadzuric	6 ft 11 in (2.11 m)	245 lb (111 kg)		UCLA
G	3	Lynn Greer	6 ft 1 in (1.85 m)	180 lb (82 kg)		Temple
F	19	Ersan Ilyasova	6 ft 10 in (2.08 m)	235 lb (107 kg)		Turkey
F	52	Damir Markota	6 ft 10 in (2.08 m)	225 lb (102 kg)		Croatia
F	34	David Noel	6 ft 6 in (1.98 m)	230 lb (104 kg)		North Carolina
G/F	23	Ruben Patterson	6 ft 5 in (1.96 m)	223 lb (101 kg)		Cincinnati
SG	22	Michael Redd	6 ft 6 in (1.98 m)	215 lb (98 kg)	1979–08–24	Ohio State
C	55	Jared Reiner	6 ft 11 in (2.11 m)	225 lb (102 kg)		Iowa
F/C	54	Brian Skinner	6 ft 9 in (2.06 m)	255 lb (116 kg)		Baylor
SF	21	Bobby Simmons (IN)	6 ft 6 in (1.98 m)	235 lb (107 kg)		DePaul
F	31	Charlie Villanueva	6 ft 11 in (2.11 m)	232 lb (105 kg)		Connecticut
PG	25	Mo Williams	6 ft 1 in (1.85 m)	185 lb (84 kg)		Alabama

Coaches
Head coach
- Larry Krystkowiak (Montana)
Assistant(s)
- Brian James (Illinois State)
- Mike Sanders (UCLA)
- Tony Brown (Arkansas)

Legend
- (DP) Unsigned draft pick
- (FA) Free agent
- (S) Suspended
- Injured

== Regular season ==
=== Season standings ===
Central Division	W	L	PCT	GB	Home	Road	Div
y-Detroit Pistons	53	29	.646	-	26–15	27–14	9–7
x-Cleveland Cavaliers	50	32	.610	3	30–11	20–21	10–6
x-Chicago Bulls	49	33	.598	4	31–10	18–23	12–4
Indiana Pacers	35	47	.427	18	22–19	13–28	8–8
Milwaukee Bucks	28	54	.341	25	18–23	10–31	1–15

#	Eastern Conference				
#	Team	W	L	PCT	GB
1	c-Detroit Pistons	53	29	.646	–
2	x-Cleveland Cavaliers	50	32	.610	3
3	y-Toronto Raptors	47	35	.573	6
4	y-Miami Heat	44	38	.537	9
5	x-Chicago Bulls	49	33	.598	4
6	x-New Jersey Nets	41	41	.500	12
7	x-Washington Wizards	41	41	.500	12
8	x-Orlando Magic	40	42	.488	13
9	Philadelphia 76ers	35	47	.427	18
10	Indiana Pacers	35	47	.427	18
11	New York Knicks	33	49	.402	20
12	Charlotte Bobcats	33	49	.402	20
13	Atlanta Hawks	30	52	.366	23
14	Milwaukee Bucks	28	54	.341	25
15	Boston Celtics	24	58	.293	29

=== Game log ===
2006–07 game log
Total: 28–54 (Home: 0–0; Road: 0–0)
October: 0–0 (home: 0–0; road: 0–0)

Game	Date	Team	Score	High points	High rebounds	High assists	Location Attendance	Record

November: 0–0 (home: 0–0; road: 0–0)

Game	Date	Team	Score	High points	High rebounds	High assists	Location Attendance	Record

December: 0–0 (home: 0–0; road: 0–0)

Game	Date	Team	Score	High points	High rebounds	High assists	Location Attendance	Record

January: 0–0 (home: 0–0; road: 0–0)

Game	Date	Team	Score	High points	High rebounds	High assists	Location Attendance	Record

February: 0–0 (home: 0–0; road: 0–0)

Game	Date	Team	Score	High points	High rebounds	High assists	Location Attendance	Record

March: 0–0 (home: 0–0; road: 0–0)

Game	Date	Team	Score	High points	High rebounds	High assists	Location Attendance	Record

April: 0–0 (home: 0–0; road: 0–0)

Game	Date	Team	Score	High points	High rebounds	High assists	Location Attendance	Record

2006–07 schedule

== Playoffs ==
After making the playoffs in 2006, the Bucks would fail to qualify for the playoffs.

== Player statistics ==
=== Regular season ===
Milwaukee Bucks statistics
Player	GP	GS	MPG	FG%	3P%	FT%	RPG	APG	SPG	BPG	PPG
Charlie Bell	82	64	34.7	.437	.352	.780	2.9	3.0	1.2	.0	13.5
Steve Blake	33	2	17.7	.349	.279	.550	3.9	1.4	2.5	.3	3.6
Andrew Bogut	66	66	34.2	.553	.200	.577	8.8	3.0	.7	.5	12.3
Earl Boykins	35	19	33.0	.427	.419	.886	2.2	4.5	.9	.0	14.0
Dan Gadzuric	54	8	15.6	.474	.000	.467	4.6	.5	.4	.6	4.8
Lynn Greer	41	0	10.5	.433	.346	.844	.7	1.3	.4	.0	4.1
Julius Hodge	5	0	5.6	.571	.	.500	1.0	.4	.2	.0	1.8
Ersan Ilyasova	66	14	14.7	.383	.365	.787	2.9	.7	.4	.3	6.1
Damir Markota	30	0	5.7	.365	.375	.636	1.0	.2	.1	.0	1.7
Chris McCray	5	0	2.4	.000	.	.	.0	.0	.0	.0	.0
David Noel	68	0	11.6	.367	.321	.860	1.8	1.0	.4	.1	2.7
Ruben Patterson	81	53	31.0	.548	.158	.641	5.4	2.9	1.4	.3	14.7
Michael Redd	53	53	38.4	.465	.382	.829	3.7	2.3	1.2	.2	26.7
Jared Reiner	27	2	9.0	.349	.	.300	2.6	.5	.2	.2	1.2
Brian Skinner	67	44	22.7	.490	.	.582	5.7	.9	.3	1.0	4.4
Charlie Villanueva	39	17	25.2	.470	.337	.820	5.8	.9	.6	.3	11.8
Mo Williams	68	68	36.4	.446	.346	.855	4.8	6.1	1.3	.1	17.3

== Transactions ==
=== Trades ===
June 28, 2006
To Milwaukee Bucks----
- Damir Markota
To San Antonio Spurs----
- 2nd round draft pick (Marcus Williams)
June 30, 2006
To Milwaukee Bucks----
- Charlie Villanueva
To Toronto Raptors----
- T. J. Ford
July 31, 2006
To Milwaukee Bucks----
- Steve Blake
- Ha Seung-Jin
- Brian Skinner
To Portland Trail Blazers----
- Jamaal Magloire
August 10, 2006
To Milwaukee Bucks----
- Ruben Patterson
To Denver Nuggets----
- Joe Smith
January 11, 2007
To Milwaukee Bucks----
- Earl Boykins
To Denver Nuggets----
- Steve Blake

=== Free agents ===
Player	Signed	Former team
Lynn Greer	July 18, 2006	S. S. Basket Napoli
Jared Reiner	February 8, 2007	Sioux Falls Skyforce
