= 2006–07 New Jersey Nets season =

NBA professional basketball team season

- Head coach: Lawrence Frank
- President: Bobby Marks (vice)
- General manager: Ed Stefanski
- Owner: Bruce Ratner
- Arena: Continental Airlines Arena

Results
- Record: 41–41 (.500)
- Place: Division: 2nd (Atlantic); Conference: 6th (Eastern)
- Playoff finish: Conference semifinals (lost to Cavaliers 2–4)
- Stats at Basketball Reference

Local media
- Television: YES Network, WWOR
- Radio: WFAN

The 2006–07 New Jersey Nets season was the team's 40th in the NBA. They began the season hoping to improve upon their 49–33 output from the previous season. However, they came eight wins shy of tying it, finishing 41–41. In the playoffs, the Nets upset Vince Carter's former team, the Toronto Raptors in the first round but could not defeat the eventual Eastern Conference champion, the LeBron James-led Cleveland Cavaliers in the next round. The Nets remain the last team with a 0.500 record to win a playoff series. The Nets had the thirteenth best team defensive rating in the NBA.

This season marked the Nets' final playoff appearance in New Jersey, and the Nets would not return to the playoffs until 2013, when they relocated to Brooklyn, New York. Following the season, Clifford Robinson retired.

== Draft picks ==
Round	Pick	Player	Position	Nationality	College
1	22	Marcus Williams	PG	United States	Connecticut
1	23	Josh Boone	PF/C	United States	Connecticut
2	54	Hassan Adams	SG	United States	Arizona

== Roster ==
2006–07 New Jersey Nets roster
Players

Pos.	No.	Player	Height	Weight	DOB	From
G	8	Hassan Adams	6 ft 4 in (1.93 m)	220 lb (100 kg)	1984-06-20	Arizona
F	2	Josh Boone	6 ft 10 in (2.08 m)	237 lb (108 kg)	1984-11-21	Connecticut
G	15	Vince Carter	6 ft 6 in (1.98 m)	220 lb (100 kg)	1977-01-26	North Carolina
F	35	Jason Collins	7 ft 0 in (2.13 m)	255 lb (116 kg)	1978-12-02	Stanford
G	50	Eddie House	6 ft 1 in (1.85 m)	190 lb (86 kg)	1978-05-14	Arizona State
C	9	Mile Ilić	7 ft 1 in (2.16 m)	229 lb (104 kg)	1984-06-02	Serbia
F	24	Richard Jefferson	6 ft 7 in (2.01 m)	230 lb (104 kg)	1980-06-21	Arizona
G	5	Jason Kidd	6 ft 4 in (1.93 m)	210 lb (95 kg)	1973-03-23	California
C	12	Nenad Krstić	7 ft 0 in (2.13 m)	260 lb (118 kg)	1983-07-25	Serbia
C	33	Mikki Moore	7 ft 0 in (2.13 m)	225 lb (102 kg)	1975-11-04	Nebraska
F	7	Boštjan Nachbar	6 ft 9 in (2.06 m)	221 lb (100 kg)	1980-07-03	Slovenia
F	22	Bernard Robinson	6 ft 6 in (1.98 m)	210 lb (95 kg)	1980-12-26	Michigan
C	30	Clifford Robinson	6 ft 10 in (2.08 m)	225 lb (102 kg)	1966-12-16	Connecticut
G	1	Marcus Williams	6 ft 3 in (1.91 m)	209 lb (95 kg)	1985-12-03	Connecticut
G	21	Antoine Wright	6 ft 7 in (2.01 m)	215 lb (98 kg)	1984-02-06	Texas A&M

Coaches
Head coach
- Lawrence Frank
Assistant(s)
- Tom Barrise
- Bill Cartwright
- Ryan Krueger
- Pat Sullivan

Legend
- (DP) Unsigned draft pick
- (FA) Free agent
- (S) Suspended
- Injured

Roster

== Regular season ==
Atlantic Division	W	L	PCT	GB	Home	Road	Div
y-Toronto Raptors	47	35	.573	-	30–11	17–24	11–5
x-New Jersey Nets	41	41	.500	6	24–17	17–24	10–6
Philadelphia 76ers	35	47	.427	12	21–20	14–27	9–7
New York Knicks	33	49	.402	14	19–22	14–27	3–13
Boston Celtics	24	58	.293	23	12–29	12–29	7–9

#	Eastern Conference				
#	Team	W	L	PCT	GB
1	c-Detroit Pistons	53	29	.646	–
2	x-Cleveland Cavaliers	50	32	.610	3
3	y-Toronto Raptors	47	35	.573	6
4	y-Miami Heat	44	38	.537	9
5	x-Chicago Bulls	49	33	.598	4
6	x-New Jersey Nets	41	41	.500	12
7	x-Washington Wizards	41	41	.500	12
8	x-Orlando Magic	40	42	.488	13
9	Philadelphia 76ers	35	47	.427	18
10	Indiana Pacers	35	47	.427	18
11	New York Knicks	33	49	.402	20
12	Charlotte Bobcats	33	49	.402	20
13	Atlanta Hawks	30	52	.366	23
14	Milwaukee Bucks	28	54	.341	25
15	Boston Celtics	24	58	.293	29

== Playoffs ==
2007 playoff game log
First Round: 4–2 (home: 3–0; road: 1–2)

Game	Date	Team	Score	High points	High rebounds	High assists	Location Attendance	Series
1	April 21	@ Toronto	W 96–91	Richard Jefferson (28)	Jason Kidd (10)	Jason Kidd (15)	Air Canada Centre; 20,330	1–0
2	April 24	@ Toronto	L 83–89	Vince Carter (19)	Kidd, Carter (11)	Jason Kidd (7)	Air Canada Centre; 20,239	1–1
3	April 27	Toronto	W 102–89	Vince Carter (37)	Jason Kidd (16)	Jason Kidd (19)	Continental Airlines Arena; 17,147	2–1
4	April 29	Toronto	W 102–81	Vince Carter (27)	Jason Kidd (8)	Jason Kidd (13)	Continental Airlines Arena; 20,032	3–1
5	May 1	@ Toronto	L 96–98	Vince Carter (30)	Mikki Moore (10)	Jason Kidd (10)	Air Canada Centre; 20,511	3–2
6	May 4	Toronto	W 98–97	Richard Jefferson (24)	Kidd, Moore (8)	Jason Kidd (15)	Continental Airlines Arena; 17,242	4–2

Conference Semifinals: 2–4 (home: 1–2; road: 1–2)

Game	Date	Team	Score	High points	High rebounds	High assists	Location Attendance	Series
1	May 6	@ Cleveland	L 77–81	Vince Carter (21)	Vince Carter (13)	Jason Kidd (9)	Quicken Loans Arena; 20,562	0–1
2	May 8	@ Cleveland	L 92–102	Vince Carter (26)	Jason Kidd (10)	Jason Kidd (8)	Quicken Loans Arena; 20,562	0–2
3	May 12	Cleveland	W 96–85	three players tied (23)	Jason Kidd (13)	Jason Kidd (14)	Continental Airlines Arena; 20,032	1–2
4	May 14	Cleveland	L 85–87	Carter, Moore (25)	Jason Kidd (17)	Vince Carter (9)	Continental Airlines Arena; 20,032	1–3
5	May 16	@ Cleveland	W 83–72	Jason Kidd (20)	Jason Kidd (9)	Vince Carter (10)	Quicken Loans Arena; 20,562	2–3
6	May 18	Cleveland	L 72–88	Jason Kidd (19)	Jason Kidd (12)	Jason Kidd (8)	Continental Airlines Arena; 20,032	2–4

2007 schedule

== Player statistics ==
Legend
GP	Games played	GS	Games started	MPG	Minutes per game
FG%	Field-goal percentage	3P%	3-point field-goal percentage	FT%	Free-throw percentage
RPG	Rebounds per game	APG	Assists per game	SPG	Steals per game
BPG	Blocks per game	PPG	Points per game

=== Regular season ===
New Jersey Nets statistics
Player	GP	GS	MPG	FG%	3P%	FT%	RPG	APG	SPG	BPG	PPG
Hassan Adams	61	8	8.1	.556	.000	.667	1.3	.2	.3	.1	2.9
Josh Boone	61	0	11.0	.579	.	.544	2.9	.2	.2	.3	4.2
Vince Carter	82	82	38.1	.454	.357	.802	6.0	4.8	1.0	.4	25.2
Jason Collins	80	78	23.1	.364	.000	.465	4.0	.6	.5	.5	2.1
Eddie House	56	1	16.9	.428	.429	.917	1.6	1.2	.5	.1	8.4
Mile Ilic	5	0	1.2	.000	.	.	.2	.0	.0	.0	.0
Richard Jefferson	55	53	35.6	.456	.359	.733	4.4	2.7	.6	.1	16.3
Jason Kidd	80	80	36.7	.406	.343	.778	8.2	9.2	1.6	.3	13.0
Nenad Krstic	26	26	32.6	.526	.000	.711	6.8	1.8	.4	.9	16.4
Mikki Moore	79	55	26.4	.609	.000	.681	5.1	.9	.6	.8	9.8
Bernard Robinson	10	0	3.7	.375	.	.800	.6	.2	.4	.1	1.0
Clifford Robinson	50	11	19.1	.372	.379	.444	2.4	1.0	.2	.5	4.1
Marcus Williams	79	2	16.6	.395	.282	.847	2.1	3.3	.4	.0	6.8
Antoine Wright	63	23	18.0	.438	.322	.603	2.8	.9	.5	.2	4.5

=== Playoffs ===
New Jersey Nets statistics
Player	GP	GS	MPG	FG%	3P%	FT%	RPG	APG	SPG	BPG	PPG
Hassan Adams	6	0	1.5	.500	.	.	.2	.0	.0	.0	.3
Josh Boone	12	0	9.8	.500	.	.500	1.6	.3	.1	.3	3.0
Vince Carter	12	12	40.6	.396	.389	.693	6.8	5.3	.9	.6	22.3
Jason Collins	12	12	27.4	.571	.	.364	3.3	.2	.6	.3	2.3
Eddie House	4	0	4.5	.250	.167	.	.5	.3	.3	.0	1.3
Richard Jefferson	12	12	40.8	.482	.325	.924	5.6	2.3	.8	.4	19.7
Jason Kidd	12	12	40.3	.432	.420	.520	10.9	10.9	1.8	.4	14.6
Mikki Moore	12	12	33.3	.560	.	.793	5.6	1.2	.8	.6	11.3
Bostjan Nachbar	12	0	23.4	.421	.375	.955	2.9	1.5	.6	.1	9.9
Bernard Robinson	1	0	6.0	.000	.	.	1.0	2.0	1.0	.0	.0
Clifford Robinson	4	0	5.0	.167	.500	.	.0	.0	.3	.0	.8
Marcus Williams	12	0	6.5	.333	.077	.800	.8	1.1	.1	.0	2.4
Antoine Wright	12	0	13.6	.472	.500	.900	1.9	.1	.4	.3	3.8

== Transactions ==
=== Trades ===
July 27, 2005	To New Jersey Nets Mikki Moore To Seattle SuperSonics 2009 second-round pick	January 3, 2007	To New Jersey Nets Bernard Robinson To Charlotte Bobcats Jeff McInnis

=== Free agents ===
Additions
Player	Date signed	Former team
Eddie House	August 17	Phoenix Suns
Awvee Storey	October 2	Washington Wizards

Subtractions
Player	Date waived	New Team
Zoran Planinić	August 11	TAU Cerámica (Spain)
Awvee Storey	October 26	Dakota Wizards (D-League)
