= Rodney Carney =

American basketball player (born 1984)

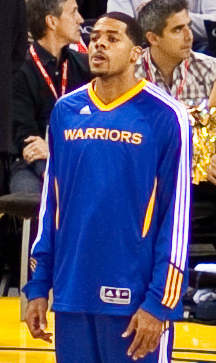
- Carney with the Golden State Warriors in 2010

Personal information
- Born: April 15, 1984 (age 42) Memphis, Tennessee, U.S.
- Listed height: 6 ft 7 in (2.01 m)
- Listed weight: 205 lb (93 kg)

Career information
- High school: Northwest (Indianapolis, Indiana)
- College: Memphis (2002–2006)
- NBA draft: 2006: 1st round, 16th overall pick
- Drafted by: Chicago Bulls
- Playing career: 2006–2018
- Position: Small forward / shooting guard
- Number: 25, 10

Career history
- 2006–2008: Philadelphia 76ers
- 2008–2009: Minnesota Timberwolves
- 2009–2010: Philadelphia 76ers
- 2010–2011: Golden State Warriors
- 2011: Memphis Grizzlies
- 2011–2012: Liaoning Dinosaurs
- 2013: Antalya BSB
- 2014: Capitanes de Arecibo
- 2014: Sporting Al Riyadi Beirut
- 2014: Tropang TNT
- 2014–2015: Cocodrilos de Caracas
- 2015: Reales de La Vega
- 2015–2016: Delaware 87ers
- 2016: Indios de Mayagüez
- 2016–2018: Toyotsu Fighting Eagles Nagoya

Career highlights
- Consensus second-team All-American (2006); Conference USA Player of the Year (2006)

Career statistics
- Points: 1,778 (5.9 ppg)
- Rebounds: 588 (2.0 rpg)
- Steals: 159 (0.5 spg)
- Stats at NBA.com
- Stats at Basketball Reference

Rodney Dion Carney (born April 15, 1984) is an American former professional basketball player. He played college basketball for the Memphis Tigers and was selected in the 2006 NBA draft by the Chicago Bulls and shortly afterwards traded to the Philadelphia 76ers.

== High school ==
While at Northwest High School, The Indianapolis Star named Carney as Player of the Year. He also made the Indiana All-Star team. Outside of basketball, Carney was the Indiana state high jump champion in his senior year, with a personal best of 6 ft 11 in (2.11 m).

== College ==
=== Early college career ===
Carney made the Conference USA all-freshman team in 2002–03, his first season at the University of Memphis. In the same season, the Tigers made their first NCAA Tournament appearance since 1996, but the seventh-seeded Tigers lost in the opening round to Arizona State.

In 2003–2004, Carney showed improvement in his stats. He needed surgery after suffering from a cracked bone above his eye, but he missed only two games. The Tigers again made it to the NCAA Tournament as a seven seed and won their opening round game against South Carolina before losing in the second round against Oklahoma State.

Carney made all-Conference USA second team in 2004–05. He led the Tigers in scoring (16 points per game) and free throw percentage (73.3%). This season, the Tigers likely wouldn't reach the NCAA Tournament unless they won the Conference USA Tournament. The Tigers reached the final game against rival Louisville. They trailed 75–73 when freshman Memphis point guard Darius Washington Jr. was fouled on a 3-point shot with no time left. However, Washington made only the first free throw, and so Memphis lost. Carney had only 5 points and 3 rebounds in the game. In the 2005 National Invitation Tournament, Memphis defeated Northeastern, Virginia Tech, and Vanderbilt before losing in the semifinals to Saint Joseph's.

=== 2005–06 season ===
In 2005–06, Carney was on the preseason and mid-season lists for the John R. Wooden Award All-American team. Carney improved his stats again, becoming one of the top players in Conference USA. Carney, the only starting senior on the team, helped lead Memphis as one of the top-ranked teams in the country and was named the Conference USA player of the year. Memphis won the 2006 Conference USA regular season and tournament championships, and entered the NCAA Tournament with a 30–3 record and the number one seed in the Oakland region.

In the opening round against Oral Roberts, Carney led Memphis with 19 points and added 5 rebounds in a 94–78 victory. In the next round, Carney scored 10 points and grabbed 4 rebounds to help Memphis beat Bucknell 72–56. Against Bradley in the Sweet Sixteen, Carney scored 23 points, grabbed 4 rebounds, and added 3 steals to help Memphis win 80–64. In the Elite Eight, Memphis was defeated 50–45 by UCLA in one of the lowest scoring games in tournament history. Carney's last game of his collegiate career was his worst of the season, managing only 3 rebounds and 1 steal and connecting on only 2 out of 12 field goals for 5 points in 26 minutes of play.

== Professional career ==
Carney was drafted by the Chicago Bulls with the 16th pick in the 2006 NBA draft. The Bulls then traded Carney and a 2007 second-round draft pick to the Philadelphia 76ers in exchange for their 13th pick, Thabo Sefolosha.

During the beginning of his rookie year in 2006–07, Carney was averaging only a little over 3 points per game and less than 1 rebound per game. But in February 2007, Carney became a starter due to the departure of Allen Iverson and Chris Webber, two of the Sixers' star players. When these events occurred, Carney was allotted more playing time, lifting his averages to over 9 points and 3 rebounds per game. Carney continued to make himself a key player on the Sixers. With a little under 20 minutes of playing time a night, Carney was a tough defender while also being a third scoring option in the starting lineup.

On July 9, 2008, Rodney Carney, Calvin Booth and a 2010 first-round pick were traded by the Sixers to the Minnesota Timberwolves for a 2010 conditional (top-55 protected) second-round pick. In return, Minnesota sent Philadelphia a future conditional second-round draft pick.

On September 15, 2009, Carney signed a deal to return to the Philadelphia 76ers. On September 8, 2010, Carney signed with the Golden State Warriors. On January 4, 2011, he was waived by the Warriors. On February 21, 2011, signed a 10-day contract with the Memphis Grizzlies.

On December 10, 2011, Carney signed with the Oklahoma City Thunder. On December 23, 2011, he was waived by the Thunder.

On September 27, 2012, Carney signed with the Miami Heat. However, he was waived on October 26, 2012.

In January 2013, he signed with Antalya BSB of Turkey.

On October 1, 2013, he signed with the New Orleans Pelicans. However, he was waived on October 7.

In March 2014, he signed with Sporting Al Riyadi Beirut of the Lebanese Basketball League.

On May 28, 2014, he was played for Tropang TNT as an import replacement for Othyus Jeffers who had a problem on his NBA contract. Carney first game as an import for the texters was not easy due to not enough rest for almost 24 hours He scored 13 points . But On his Second Game Against San Miguel Beermen (Philippines) He Scored 28 points and 9 rebounds . And They Win Over the San Miguel Beermen (Philippines)

In November 2014, he signed with Cocodrilos de Caracas of Venezuela.

On May 5, 2015, he signed with Reales de La Vega of the Dominican Republic's Liga Nacional de Baloncesto.

On October 31, 2015, Carney was selected by the Oklahoma City Blue with the 13th overall pick in the 2015 NBA Development League draft, only to be traded to the Delaware 87ers on draft night. On November 29, he made his debut for the 87ers in a 125–109 win over Raptors 905, recording nine points and one rebound in 19 minutes off the bench.

On April 7, 2016, Carney signed with Indios de Mayagüez of the Puerto Rican League. The next day, he made his debut in an 82–75 loss to the Cangrejeros de Santurce, recording nine points, three rebounds, one assist and one block in 26 minutes.

On August 19, 2016, Carney signed with the Japanese team Toyotsu Fighting Eagles Nagoya.

== Highlights ==
- Among rookie qualifiers in 2006–07, ranked 14th in scoring (6.6 ppg) and fifth in field goal percentage (46.4%); also had the second highest three-point percentage (34.7%) of any Sixer this past season.
- At Golden State on December 26, 2006, he posted career-highs of 25 points and 8 rebounds, becoming the first Sixer rookie to have at least 25 points and 8 boards in the same game since Allen Iverson did it on April 9, 1997.
- Scored in double-figures 13 times over his final 28 games played in 2006–07 after doing so just five times in his first 39 games played... averaged 8.8 points on 53.7% shooting in his final eight games played.
- Committed just 43 turnovers in 67 games played in 2006–07 and almost had as many steals (38) as turnovers.
- At the 2006 Rocky Mountain Revue, averaged 16.7 points and 2.3 rebounds in 25.7 minutes and led the Revue in 3-point field goal percentage (.714, 5–7 3FG).
- Holds the University of Memphis career record for 3-pointers made (287), which ranks in Conference USA history, and single-season record for three-pointers made (102, 2005–06).
- Finished four-year college career ranked third in school history career points (1,901) and second for games played (133).
- Averaged 17.2 points as a senior (2005–06) and was named Conference USA Player of the Year and a Conference USA's All-Tournament Team selection.

== Personal ==
Carney's mother, DeAndra Ware, was a world-class sprinter holding the world indoor record in the 60-yard dash and 55-meter dash and would have competed in the 1980 Summer Olympics if not for the U.S. boycott. The fact that she could not compete in the Olympics motivated Rodney to play in the NBA. DeAndra was also the Indiana state champion in the 100m and 200m dash. His brother, Ron Slay, was a basketball star at the University of Tennessee and plays professional basketball in Europe. He also has two other half-brothers: Ramon Foster who played football at University of Tennessee, and Renardo Foster, who played football at University of Louisville. Renardo played for the NFL's St. Louis Rams and Ramon played for the NFL's Pittsburgh Steelers.

== NBA career statistics ==
Legend
| GP | Games played | GS | Games started | MPG | Minutes per game |
| FG% | Field goal percentage | 3P% | 3-point field goal percentage | FT% | Free throw percentage |
| RPG | Rebounds per game | APG | Assists per game | SPG | Steals per game |
| BPG | Blocks per game | PPG | Points per game | **Bold** | Career high |

=== Regular season ===
| Year | Team | GP | GS | MPG | FG% | 3P% | FT% | RPG | APG | SPG | BPG | PPG |
|---|---|---|---|---|---|---|---|---|---|---|---|---|
| 2006–07 | Philadelphia | 67 | **35** | 17.4 | **.464** | .347 | .609 | 1.9 | .4 | .6 | .3 | 6.6 |
| 2007–08 | Philadelphia | **70** | 6 | 14.8 | .403 | .317 | .679 | **2.1** | **.5** | .6 | .3 | 5.8 |
| 2008–09 | Minnesota | 67 | 6 | **17.9** | .416 | .350 | .758 | 1.9 | .4 | **.7** | **.4** | **7.2** |
| 2009–10 | Philadelphia | 68 | 0 | 12.6 | .401 | .304 | **.825** | 2.0 | **.5** | .4 | .3 | 4.7 |
| 2010–11 | Golden State | 25 | 1 | 13.2 | .421 | **.459** | .667 | 1.9 | .4 | .4 | .2 | 5.0 |
| 2010–11 | Memphis | 2 | 0 | 2.5 | .333 | .000 | .000 | .5 | .0 | .5 | .0 | 1.0 |
| Career | | 299 | 48 | 15.4 | .422 | .338 | .704 | 2.0 | .4 | .5 | .3 | 5.9 |

=== Playoffs ===
| Year | Team | GP | GS | MPG | FG% | 3P% | FT% | RPG | APG | SPG | BPG | PPG |
|---|---|---|---|---|---|---|---|---|---|---|---|---|
| 2008 | Philadelphia | 6 | 0 | 14.0 | .387 | .500 | .500 | 1.2 | .8 | 1.2 | .3 | 5.0 |
| Career | | 6 | 0 | 14.0 | .387 | .500 | .500 | 1.2 | .8 | 1.2 | .3 | 5.0 |
