= Raymond Felton =

American basketball player (born 1984)

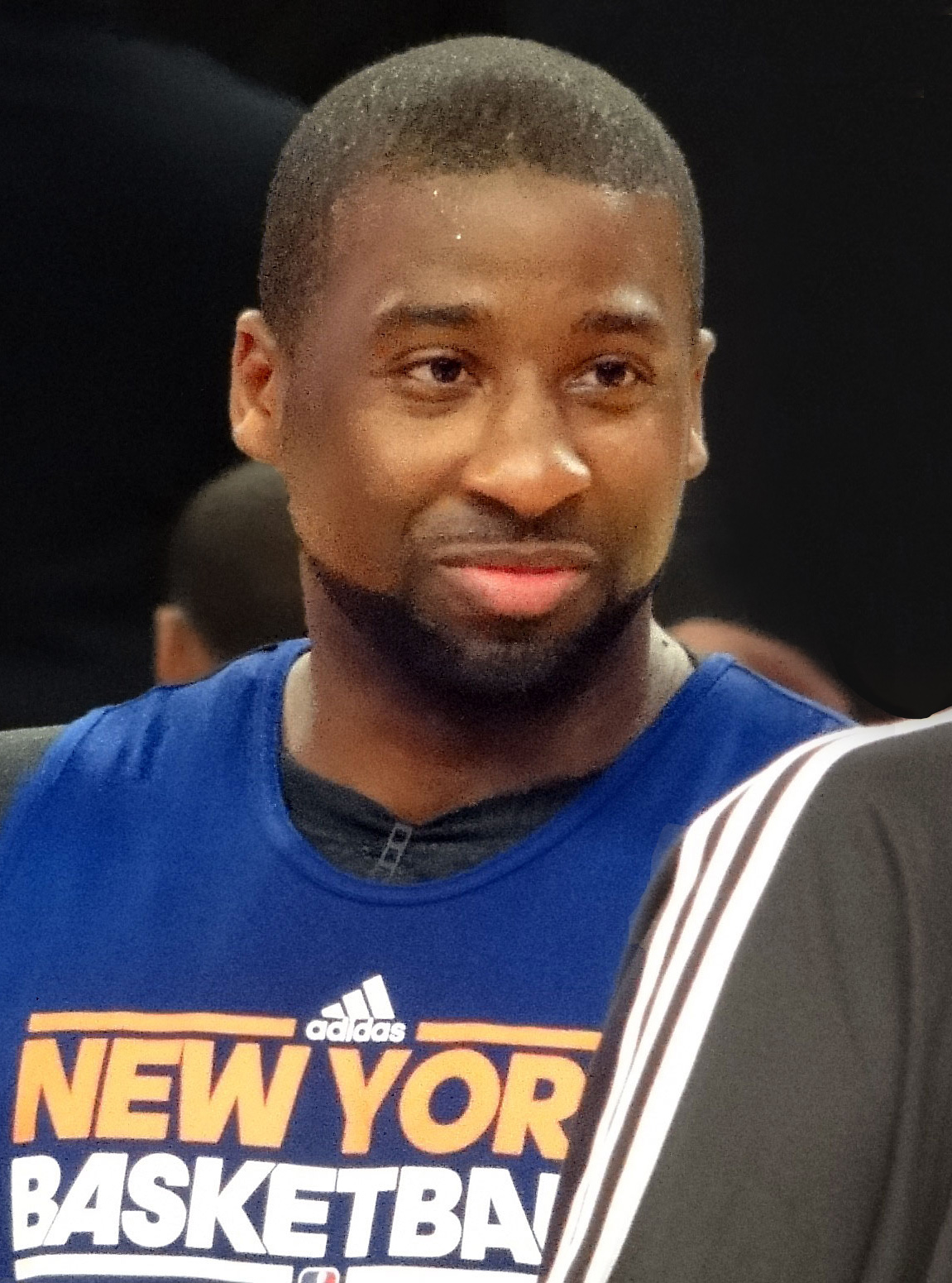
- Felton with the New York Knicks in 2010

Personal information
- Born: June 26, 1984 (age 42) Marion, South Carolina, U.S.
- Listed height: 6 ft 1 in (1.85 m)
- Listed weight: 205 lb (93 kg)

Career information
- High school: Latta (Latta, South Carolina)
- College: North Carolina (2002–2005)
- NBA draft: 2005: 1st round, 5th overall pick
- Drafted by: Charlotte Bobcats
- Playing career: 2005–2019
- Position: Point guard / shooting guard
- Number: 20, 2, 5

Career history
- 2005–2010: Charlotte Bobcats
- 2010–2011: New York Knicks
- 2011: Denver Nuggets
- 2011–2012: Portland Trail Blazers
- 2012–2014: New York Knicks
- 2014–2016: Dallas Mavericks
- 2016–2017: Los Angeles Clippers
- 2017–2019: Oklahoma City Thunder

Career highlights
- NBA All-Rookie Second Team (2006); NCAA Champion (2005); Bob Cousy Award (2005); Third-team All-American – AP (2005); First-team All-ACC (2005); 2× Third-team All-ACC (2003, 2004); All-ACC Freshman Team (2003); No. 2 honored by North Carolina Tar Heels; Naismith Prep Player of the Year (2002); First-team Parade All-American (2002); Third-team Parade All-American (2001); McDonald's All-American (2002); South Carolina Mr. Basketball (2002)
- Stats at NBA.com
- Stats at Basketball Reference

Raymond Bernard Felton Jr. (born June 26, 1984) is an American former professional basketball player who played 14 seasons in the National Basketball Association (NBA). Felton played college basketball for the North Carolina Tar Heels under head coach Roy Williams.

At North Carolina, Felton led the Tar Heels to a national championship before declaring for the NBA draft. Felton was drafted fifth overall in the 2005 NBA draft. Over his career, Felton was a member of the Charlotte Bobcats, New York Knicks (twice), Denver Nuggets, Portland Trail Blazers, Dallas Mavericks, Los Angeles Clippers and Oklahoma City Thunder. He played the point guard position.

== Early life ==
Felton began his basketball career at Latta High School in Latta, South Carolina. He led his high school to two state championships and a career record of 104–9. In the process, Felton set state scoring records with 2,992 points and 117 three-pointers.

Felton won the South Carolina Mr. Basketball award as both a junior and senior, and was named Naismith Prep Player of the Year in 2002. He was the MVP of the 2002 Roundball Classic at the United Center in Chicago, and was selected for the 2002 McDonald's All-American Game (at Madison Square Garden in New York City). Felton played in the McDonald's All-American Game on the same team with two future New York Knicks teammates, Carmelo Anthony and Amar'e Stoudemire.

Considered a five-star recruit by Scout.com, Felton was listed as the No. 1 point guard and the No. 3 player in his high school class in 2002.

== College career ==
In his freshman year, he was named Carolina Player of the Year and ACC Freshman of the Week three times. He had 236 assists, and averaged 12.0 points a game. During his sophomore year, he was a finalist for the Bob Cousy Award and the Naismith College Player of the Year Award, had 213 assists, and led the Tar Heels in steals (63) and free throw percentage (81%) while averaging 11.5 points per game. Also notable in his second year, Felton set a single-game school-record 18 assists against George Mason on December 7, 2003.

In his third and final season at North Carolina, Felton led the Tar Heels along with fellow juniors Rashad McCants and Sean May and freshman Marvin Williams to the 2005 national championship over the University of Illinois Fighting Illini on April 4, 2005, in St. Louis. This was the fourth men's basketball championship in UNC's history (1957, 1982, 1993, 2005). Felton hit a key three-pointer over Deron Williams to break a 65–65 tie late in the game, and then came up with a crucial steal in the final seconds when Illinois had a chance to either tie the game or take the lead. His two free throws after the steal provided the final scoring in the game.

Felton averaged 12.9 points and 6.9 assists per game during his junior season and showed a much-improved shooting touch. In recognition of his efforts, he was voted to the All-ACC First Team that season. Felton also won the Bob Cousy Award that honors the best collegiate point guard. Following his junior campaign, EA Sports put Felton on the cover of NCAA March Madness 06.

== Professional career ==
=== Charlotte Bobcats (2005–2010) ===
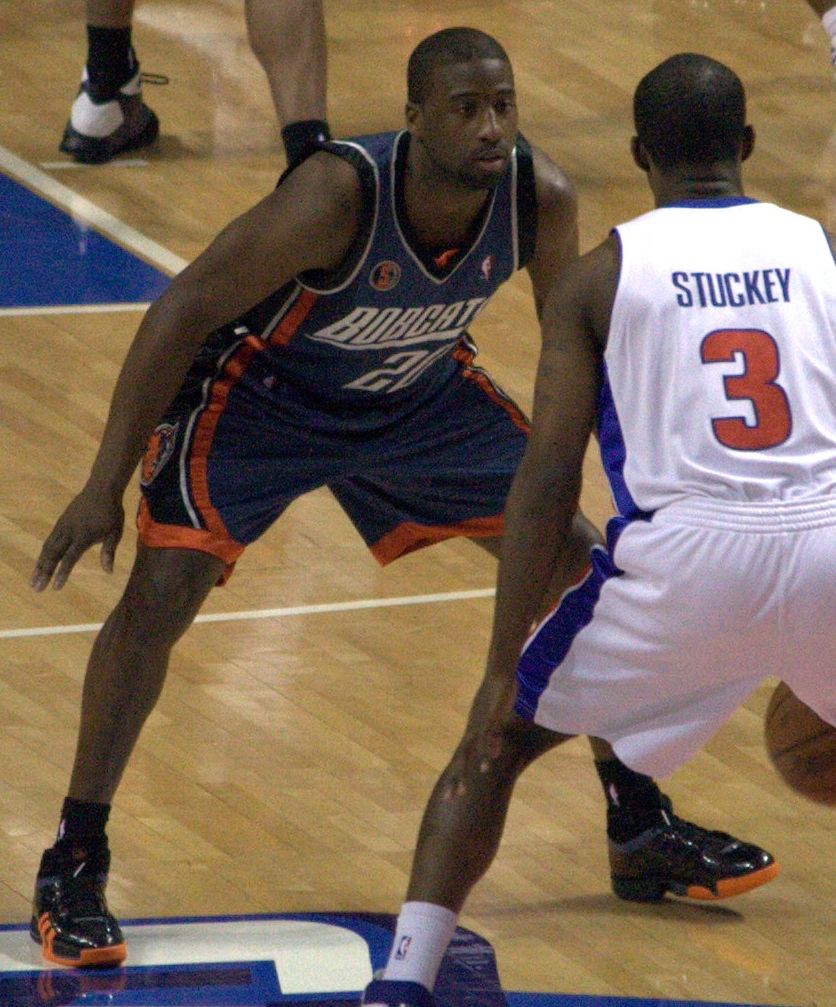
Felton in December 2009, defending Rodney Stuckey of the Detroit Pistons

Felton was selected 5th overall in the 2005 NBA draft by the Charlotte Bobcats. Felton was drafted after point guards Chris Paul and Deron Williams. University of North Carolina teammates Marvin Williams, Rashad McCants and Sean May were also selected in the draft. Felton showed promise right out of college, having his breakout game scoring 31 points against the Phoenix Suns in a Bobcats loss. Felton's best all-around game of his rookie year occurred January 28, 2006, when he recorded 18 points and 13 assists against the Washington Wizards. Felton started 54 of 82 games for the Bobcats and averaged 11.9 points per game, 5.6 assists per game, and 3.3 rebounds per game. In his rookie year, Felton recorded 13 double-doubles. Felton was selected to the NBA All-Rookie Second Team.

Felton came into his second year as the Bobcats' starting point guard. Felton improved in mostly every statistic category, raising his assist per game tally from 5.6 to 7.0. Instrumental in the increase was the improved play of teammates Gerald Wallace, Sean May, and Emeka Okafor and the addition of then-rookies Adam Morrison and Walter Herrmann. Despite Felton's solid season, the Bobcats missed the playoffs.

Coming into his third year, the Bobcats looked for more talent for Felton to distribute to, bringing in popular scoring shooting guard Jason Richardson. The 2007–08 season was still, however, a season of rebuilding for the Bobcats; several players took a step back instead of a step forward. May, Morrison and Herrmann took steps back and the Bobcats were plagued with injuries. The Bobcats once again missed the playoffs. Felton improved on his sophomore campaign, putting up 14.4 points per game, 7.4 assists and 3.0 rebounds per game. Felton also became more efficient, raising his shooting percentage from 38% to 41%. Felton still, however, struggled shooting from three-point range, one of his biggest deficiencies coming out of college.

The Bobcats even put more pressure on Felton by drafting D. J. Augustin in the 2008 draft. The Bobcats hired coach Larry Brown to be their head coach. However Felton regressed in scoring, assists and FG%. The Bobcats dealt Richardson and began to rebuild once again. The Bobcats missed the playoffs and hadn't made the playoffs since being created in 2004.

During the 2009 off-season, Felton was a restricted free agent. However, he did not sign a contract offer with another team and returned to Charlotte for one more season after signing the qualifying offer on September 23, 2009. During the 2009 season, the Bobcats had their most successful year. However, Felton did not; he saw his assist and scoring numbers drop to their lowest point since his rookie season. Felton, however, raised his field goal percentage to a career-high 46% and improved his stroke from the three-point line, shooting 38.5%. In March, Michael Jordan became the majority owner of the Bobcats. The Bobcats added Stephen Jackson and Tyson Chandler via trades, and Tyrus Thomas and Larry Hughes late in the season. The Bobcats made the playoffs for the first time in franchise history. In the playoffs, Felton averaged 11.8 points per game, 2.5 rebounds per game and 5 assists per game. The Bobcats were swept out of the playoffs, and Felton became a free agent at the end of the season.

=== New York Knicks (2010–2011) ===
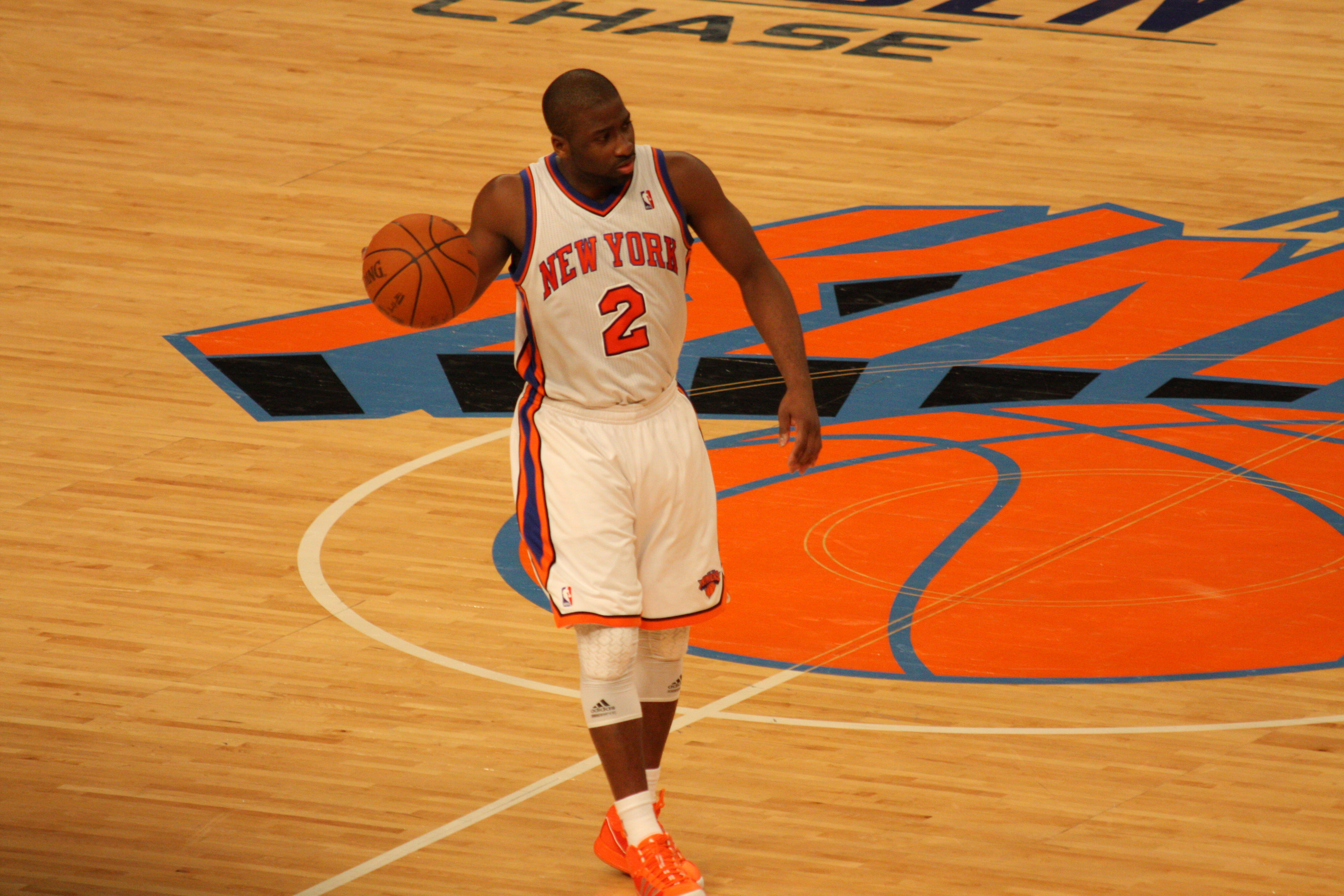
Felton playing for the Knicks in December 2010

On July 9, 2010, Felton agreed to a contract with the New York Knicks. Two days later, the deal was finalized for two years and $15.8 million. Felton was selected as co-captain for the 2011 season alongside fellow free agent signee Amar'e Stoudemire. Early in the year, Felton had trouble working the pick-and-roll with Stoudemire. But after a few games, Felton gained confidence and in no time was a fan-favorite in New York City. Felton hit a number of clutch shots, including a step-back fade-away three-pointer that pinballed into the net against the Toronto Raptors. The change of scenery seemed to be helping Felton; his play also saw the Knicks in playoff contention for the first time since 2004. Felton's time in New York, however, would not last long.

=== Denver Nuggets (2011) ===
On February 22, 2011, Felton was traded to the Denver Nuggets in a three-way deal which also involved the Minnesota Timberwolves that brought Carmelo Anthony to New York. The deal sent Felton along with teammates Wilson Chandler, Danilo Gallinari, and Timofey Mozgov to the Denver Nuggets. With the Knicks, Felton was on pace to have his best season ever. Felton also registered a fair number of All-Star votes by fans. Felton averaged 17.1 points, 9.0 assists, 3.6 rebounds, and 1.8 steals per game in 38.4 minutes a game. In Denver, Felton was utilized mostly off the bench behind fellow University of North Carolina guard Ty Lawson. Felton and the Nuggets made it to the playoffs where the Nuggets went up against Kevin Durant, Russell Westbrook and the Oklahoma City Thunder. Felton averaged 11.6 points, 6.5 assists and 1.8 rebounds in the postseason. As a whole, 2010–11 was Felton's best season; he averaged 15.5 points per game and 8.6 assists per game.

Felton, however, expressed dissatisfaction of playing off the bench and behind Lawson. On June 23, 2011, during the 2011 NBA draft, Felton was traded to the Portland Trail Blazers for veteran point guard Andre Miller and the 26th overall selection in the draft, Jordan Hamilton. In the deal, the Trail Blazers also dealt Rudy Fernández and the rights to Finnish guard Petteri Koponen.

=== Portland Trail Blazers (2011–2012) ===
In his regular season debut with the Blazers, Felton finished the game with 12 points, 6 rebounds, 8 assists and a steal in a 107–103 win over the Philadelphia 76ers. Felton and the Blazers struggled throughout the season. Felton did not get along with head coach Nate McMillan, who was eventually fired and replaced by Kaleb Canales, who became the youngest head coach in NBA history. Felton was benched by McMillan at one point in favor of Jamal Crawford. The Blazers finished the season at 28–38 (.424), finishing in eleventh place in the Western Conference. For Felton it was one of the worst seasons of his career, as he averaged a career low 11.4 points on 40.7% field goal shooting and 30.5% three-point shooting.

=== Return to New York (2012–2014) ===
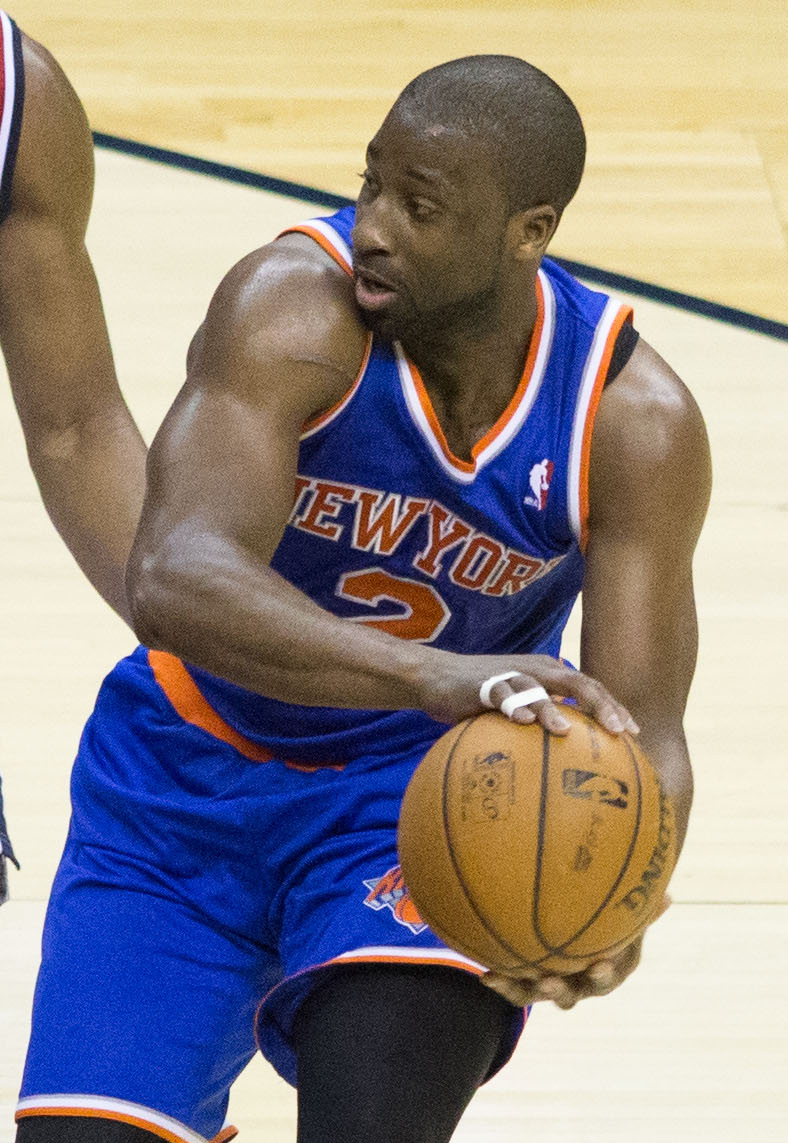
Felton playing for the Knicks in March 2013

On July 16, 2012, Felton and Kurt Thomas were traded to the New York Knicks for Jared Jeffries, Dan Gadzuric, the rights to Kostas Papanikolaou and Giorgos Printezis, and a second round draft pick. Felton signed a three-year, $10 million extension with the Knicks. Felton came under fire because of the shape he was in with Portland. Felton acknowledged his weight, saying, "I won’t make any excuses, I wasn't in shape." At a Las Vegas Summer League game between the Knicks and the Toronto Raptors, Felton told Walt Frazier and Mike Breen he had lost more than 20 pounds (9 kg). Felton also said he felt he was better than Jeremy Lin, who was signed by the Houston Rockets that offseason.

On November 2, 2012, when the season tipped off for the Knicks, Felton recorded 14 points and 9 assists in a 104–84 win over the defending champion Miami Heat. On November 15, 2012, Felton led the Knicks to a 104–100 road victory over the San Antonio Spurs as he helped his team overcome a 12-point deficit in the fourth quarter with his 25 points and 7 assists. On December 6, 2012, Felton scored a season-high 27 points in a 112–92 road win over the Heat to hand them their first home loss of the season. The Knicks won the game without Carmelo Anthony. In mid December, Felton reportedly suffered a hand injury, but decided to play through it for some games. After consulting a hand specialist, and being informed he did not have to have surgery, it was noted he would miss 4–6 weeks. On January 23, 2013, he was medically cleared for contact, and he made his return on January 26, 2013, against the Philadelphia 76ers.

On February 25, 2014, Felton was reportedly arrested on felony gun charges. As part of a plea deal, Felton pleaded guilty to attempted criminal possession of a weapon and criminal possession of a firearm. He was assessed a $5,000 fine and 500 hours of community service. In addition, the NBA suspended Felton for the first four games of the 2014–15 season.

=== Dallas Mavericks (2014–2016) ===
On June 25, 2014, Felton, along with Tyson Chandler, was traded to the Dallas Mavericks in exchange for Shane Larkin, Wayne Ellington, José Calderón, Samuel Dalembert, and the 34th and 51st picks in the 2014 NBA draft. On August 7, 2014, Felton was charged with a four-game suspension by the NBA in response to him pleading guilty for gun possession.

After missing the first 31 games of the 2014–15 season with an ankle injury he sustained during preseason, Felton made his debut for the Mavericks on December 28 against the Oklahoma City Thunder as he played just over a minute of action and recorded no stats in the 112–107 win.

On June 22, 2015, Felton exercised his player option with the Mavericks for the 2015–16 season. On December 12, 2015, he recorded 10 points, 11 assists and 11 rebounds, the first triple-double by a Maverick since Jason Kidd did so in March 2011.

=== Los Angeles Clippers (2016–2017) ===
On July 25, 2016, Felton signed with the Los Angeles Clippers.

=== Oklahoma City Thunder (2017–2019) ===
On July 10, 2017, Felton signed with the Oklahoma City Thunder. On July 12, 2018, he re-signed with the Thunder.

Felton became an unrestricted free agent on Monday, July 1, 2019, at 12:01 a.m. ET.

== NBA career statistics ==
Legend
GP	Games played	GS	Games started	MPG	Minutes per game
FG%	Field goal percentage	3P%	3-point field goal percentage	FT%	Free throw percentage
RPG	Rebounds per game	APG	Assists per game	SPG	Steals per game
BPG	Blocks per game	PPG	Points per game	**Bold**	Career high
*	Led the league

=== Regular season ===
Year	Team	GP	GS	MPG	FG%	3P%	FT%	RPG	APG	SPG	BPG	PPG
2005–06	Charlotte	80	54	30.1	.391	.358	.725	3.3	5.6	1.3	.1	11.9
2006–07	Charlotte	78	75	36.3	.384	.330	.797	3.4	7.0	1.5	.1	14.0
2007–08	Charlotte	79	79	37.6	.413	.280	.800	3.0	7.4	1.2	.2	14.4
2008–09	Charlotte	**82***	**81**	37.6	.408	.285	.805	**3.8**	6.7	1.5	**.4**	14.2
2009–10	Charlotte	80	80	33.0	**.459**	.385	.763	3.6	5.6	1.5	.3	12.1
2010–11	New York	54	54	**38.4**	.423	.328	.867	3.6	**9.0**	**1.8**	.2	**17.1**
2010–11	Denver	21	0	31.6	.431	**.459**	.617	3.6	6.5	1.3	.0	11.5
2011–12	Portland	60	56	31.8	.407	.305	.806	2.5	6.5	1.3	.2	11.4
2012–13	New York	68	68	34.0	.427	.360	.789	2.9	5.5	1.4	.2	13.9
2013–14	New York	65	65	31.0	.395	.318	.721	3.0	5.6	1.2	**.4**	9.7
2014–15	Dallas	29	3	9.7	.406	.294	.800	.9	1.4	.4	.1	3.7
2015–16	Dallas	80	31	27.4	.406	.282	.847	3.2	3.6	.9	.2	9.5
2016–17	L.A. Clippers	80	11	21.2	.430	.319	.781	2.7	2.4	.8	.3	6.7
2017–18	Oklahoma City	**82***	2	16.6	.406	.352	.818	1.9	2.5	.6	.2	6.9
2018–19	Oklahoma City	33	0	11.5	.407	.328	**.923**	1.0	1.6	.3	.2	4.3
Career		971	659	29.7	.412	.329	.790	3.0	5.2	1.2	.2	11.2

=== Playoffs ===
Year	Team	GP	GS	MPG	FG%	3P%	FT%	RPG	APG	SPG	BPG	PPG
2010	Charlotte	4	4	32.5	.405	.308	.750	2.5	**5.0**	.5	.0	11.8
2011	Denver	5	0	30.4	.360	.250	.750	1.8	4.2	1.2	.0	11.6
2013	New York	**12**	**12**	**37.8**	.444	.321	.667	3.4	4.7	**1.7**	**.4**	14.1
2015	Dallas	3	1	12.0	.267	.000	**1.000**	2.3	1.3	.0	.0	3.7
2016	Dallas	5	4	34.4	.464	.286	.636	**4.6**	4.6	1.2	.0	**15.0**
2017	L.A Clippers	7	0	18.1	**.469**	.444	**1.000**	1.4	1.4	.9	.0	5.6
2018	Oklahoma City	6	0	13.1	.387	**.500**	.000	2.2	1.5	.7	.3	5.2
2019	Oklahoma City	5	0	11.4	.308	.250	.500	.6	.6	.8	.2	2.2
Career		47	21	25.7	.420	.321	.711	2.5	3.1	1.0	.2	9.4

== Awards ==
- All-NBA Rookie Second Team 2005–06
- No. 2 jersey is honored in the rafters of the Dean Dome at UNC
- NCAA All-Tournament Team: 2005
- Associated Press Men's Basketball Third Team: 2004–05
- Voted Carolina's Most Valuable Player: 2002–03, 2004–05 (Shared with Sean May)
- Winner of Bob Cousy Award: 2005
- First Team All-ACC: 2004–05
- Third Team All-ACC: 2002–03, 2003–04
- First Team All-ACC Tournament: 2003
- ACC All-Defensive Team Honorable Mention: 2004–05
- ACC All-Freshmen Team: 2002–03
- Naismith Prep Player of the Year: 2002

== Personal life ==
Felton's nephew, Jalek Felton, briefly played for UNC during the 2017–18 season, before being suspended by the school in January 2018. In July 2018, Jalek signed for Slovenian club Petrol Olimpija.
