= Stephen Graham (basketball) =

American basketball player (born 1982)

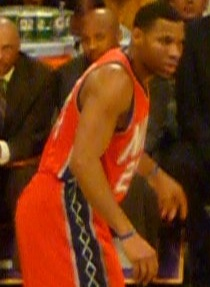
- Graham with the Nets

Personal information
- Born: June 11, 1982 (age 44) Wilmington, Delaware
- Listed height: 6 ft 6 in (1.98 m)
- Listed weight: 215 lb (98 kg)

Career information
- High school: Brandon (Brandon, Florida)
- College: UCF (2000–2002); Oklahoma State (2003–2005)
- NBA draft: 2005: undrafted
- Playing career: 2005–2013
- Position: Small forward / shooting guard
- Number: 9, 1, 24, 23, 26
- Coaching career: 2015–present

Career history

Playing
- 2005–2006: Sioux Falls Skyforce
- 2005: Houston Rockets
- 2006: Chicago Bulls
- 2006: Cleveland Cavaliers
- 2006–2007: Portland Trail Blazers
- 2007–2009: Indiana Pacers
- 2009–2010: Charlotte Bobcats
- 2010–2011: New Jersey Nets
- 2011: Fort Wayne Mad Ants
- 2012: Capitanes de Arecibo
- 2013: Guaros de Lara

Coaching
- 2015–2016: Fort Wayne Mad Ants (assistant)
- 2016–2025: Denver Nuggets (player development)
- Stats at NBA.com
- Stats at Basketball Reference

Stephen Graham (born June 11, 1982) is an American former professional basketball player coach. Graham's twin brother, Joey, was his college teammate and has also played in the NBA.

== High school and college career ==
Born in Wilmington, Delaware, Graham played competitively at Florida's Brandon High School, and was team captain his senior year in which he averaged 16 points, 8 rebounds and 6 assists per game; in that year, he and his brother Joey led Brandon to the state finals. Graham was named to Hillsborough County's All-Conference team his junior year and to the All-State team his senior season. He played in the AAU's Junior Olympics National Game and was named an All-American. He was a member of both Tampa's championship AAU Sunshine State Games' team, and Nike's traveling Florida team. He was recruited by South Florida, Richmond, Florida State and Florida.

Graham spent his freshman and sophomore college basketball seasons (2000–01; 2001–02) with the University of Central Florida Knights, then transferred to Oklahoma State University for his junior year (2002–03) in which he redshirted. In his first season with the Cowboys in 2003–04, he only twice scored 12 points, his season-high. He averaged a mere 2.8 points, 1.4 rebounds and 0.7 assists per game overall, but he was named first-team Academic All-Big 12 for his academic achievements. A highlight in his senior season in 2004–05 was leading the Cowboys with 22 points in a 78–75 home loss to Gonzaga on December 28, 2004. For his second and final season for Oklahoma State, he averaged 6.5 points, 3.2 rebounds and 1.1 assists per game.

== Professional career ==
After playing through his senior year with the Oklahoma State Cowboys, Graham declared for the 2005 NBA draft. However, he was not selected. He played for the Phoenix Suns in the Las Vegas Summer League, and then for the San Antonio Spurs during the 2005 preseason, but was not offered a longer contract by either team. He then joined the CBA, a minor league, signing with the Sioux Falls Skyforce. Graham was signed by the NBA's Houston Rockets on December 10, 2005, but was cut on December 29 after playing in six games.

After returning to the Skyforce in the interim, he signed a 10-day contract with the Chicago Bulls on January 17, 2006. He played his first game in a Bulls uniform three days later against the Rockets. However, Graham saw limited playing time with the Bulls and his contract was not extended when it expired.

On February 6, Graham was signed to a 10-day contract by the Cleveland Cavaliers. On February 20, he was signed to a second 10-day contract, then for the rest of the season.

He spent the first two months of the 2006–07 NBA season with the Portland Trail Blazers, but was waived on January 2, 2007, playing with an old acquaintance, the Skyforce in South Dakota, who were now a part of the D-League.

In July 2007, he signed with the Indiana Pacers.

He signed with the Charlotte Bobcats in September 2009.

On September 15, 2010, Graham signed with the New Jersey Nets. The Nets waived Graham on December 22, 2011, following the lockout.

On March 13, 2012, Graham was acquired by the Fort Wayne Mad Ants.

On September 30, 2013, Graham signed with the Milwaukee Bucks. However, he was waived on October 26.

On December 21, 2013, Graham signed with Guaros de Lara.

Graham competes for the Ants Alumni in The Basketball Tournament. He was a forward on the 2015 team who made it to the semifinals, falling 87–76 to Team 23.

== Coaching career ==
On October 21, 2015, he was hired by the Fort Wayne Mad Ants to work as an assistant coach.

He was announced as a player development coach for the Denver Nuggets for the 2016–17 season. On May 30, 2025, it was announced that Graham and the Nuggets would be parting ways.

== NBA career statistics ==
Legend
GP	Games played	GS	Games started	MPG	Minutes per game
FG%	Field goal percentage	3P%	3-point field goal percentage	FT%	Free throw percentage
RPG	Rebounds per game	APG	Assists per game	SPG	Steals per game
BPG	Blocks per game	PPG	Points per game	**Bold**	Career high

=== Regular season ===
Year	Team	GP	GS	MPG	FG%	3P%	FT%	RPG	APG	SPG	BPG	PPG
2005–06	Houston	6	0	6.3	.375	.200	**1.000**	1.2	.5	**.3**	.0	2.8
2005–06	Chicago	3	0	6.7	.200	.250	**1.000**	1.0	.3	.0	.0	1.7
2005–06	Cleveland	13	0	9.0	.424	.000	.889	1.3	.2	.2	**.2**	2.8
2006–07	Portland	14	1	11.8	.425	.273	.889	1.5	.4	**.3**	.1	3.2
2007–08	Indiana	22	0	5.8	**.586**	**.500**	.750	1.0	.4	.2	.0	4.0
2008–09	Indiana	52	6	13.2	.414	.303	.806	1.8	.6	.2	.1	**5.4**
2009–10	Charlotte	**70**	8	11.5	.496	.320	.646	1.9	.3	**.3**	.1	4.2
2010–11	New Jersey	59	**28**	**16.3**	.405	.238	.816	**2.1**	**.7**	.2	.0	3.4
Career		239	43	12.2	.446	.308	.766	1.8	.5	.2	.1	4.0

=== Playoffs ===
Year	Team	GP	GS	MPG	FG%	3P%	FT%	RPG	APG	SPG	BPG	PPG
2010	Charlotte	2	0	2.5	.000	.000	.000	.0	.5	.5	.0	.0
Career		2	0	2.5	.000	.000	.000	.0	.5	.5	.0	.0
