= 2009–10 Charlotte Bobcats season =

NBA professional basketball team season

- Head coach: Larry Brown
- President: Michael Jordan
- General manager: Rod Higgins
- Owners: Robert L. Johnson; Michael Jordan
- Arena: Time Warner Cable Arena

Results
- Record: 44–38 (.537)
- Place: Division: 4th (Southeast); Conference: 7th (Eastern)
- Playoff finish: First Round (lost to Magic 0–4)
- Stats at Basketball Reference

Local media
- Television: Fox Sports South, SportSouth
- Radio: WFNZ

The 2009–10 Charlotte Bobcats season was the 20th season of NBA basketball in Charlotte, and their 6th as the Charlotte Bobcats. Michael Jordan bought controlling interest in the team from founding owner Bob Johnson in March.

The season saw the franchise finish with its first winning record and playoff appearance in its current incarnation. However, their playoff stay was short-lived, as they were swept by the Orlando Magic in four games of the first round.

== Key dates ==
- June 25 – The 2009 NBA draft took place in New York City.
- July 8 – The free agency period started.

== Offseason ==
=== 2009 NBA draft ===
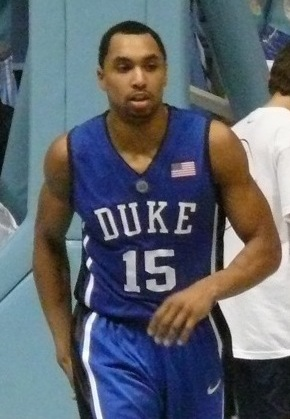
The Bobcats selected Gerald Henderson with their first pick in the 2009 NBA draft.

The Charlotte Bobcats made the following selections:

| Round | Pick | Player | Nationality | Position | School/Club team |
|---|---|---|---|---|---|
| 1 | 12 | Gerald Henderson | United States | SG | Duke |
| 2 | 40 | Derrick Brown | United States | PF | Xavier |
| 2 | 54 | Robert Vaden | United States | SG | UAB |

=== Free agency ===
Charlotte free agents:

- Raymond Felton
- Juwan Howard
- Dontell Jefferson
- Sean Singletary

== Roster ==
2009–10 Charlotte Bobcats roster
Players

| Pos. | No. | Player | Height | Weight | DOB | From |
|---|---|---|---|---|---|---|
| C | 21 | Alexis Ajinça (IN) | 7 ft 0 in (2.13 m) | 220 lb (100 kg) | | France |
| G | 14 | D. J. Augustin | 6 ft 0 in (1.83 m) | 180 lb (82 kg) | | Texas |
| F | 4 | Derrick Brown | 6 ft 8 in (2.03 m) | 227 lb (103 kg) | | Xavier |
| C | 6 | Tyson Chandler | 7 ft 1 in (2.16 m) | 235 lb (107 kg) | | Dominguez HS (CA) |
| F | 32 | Boris Diaw | 6 ft 8 in (2.03 m) | 235 lb (107 kg) | | France |
| C | 7 | DeSagana Diop (IN) | 7 ft 0 in (2.13 m) | 280 lb (127 kg) | | Oak Hill Academy (Virginia) |
| G | 20 | Raymond Felton | 6 ft 1 in (1.85 m) | 198 lb (90 kg) | | North Carolina |
| F | 23 | Stephen Graham | 6 ft 6 in (1.98 m) | 215 lb (98 kg) | | Oklahoma State |
| G | 15 | Gerald Henderson (IN) | 6 ft 5 in (1.96 m) | 215 lb (98 kg) | | Duke |
| G | 0 | Larry Hughes | 6 ft 5 in (1.96 m) | 185 lb (84 kg) | | Saint Louis |
| G/F | 1 | Stephen Jackson | 6 ft 8 in (2.03 m) | 215 lb (98 kg) | | Oak Hill Academy (VA) |
| C | 13 | Nazr Mohammed | 6 ft 10 in (2.08 m) | 250 lb (113 kg) | | Kentucky |
| C | 42 | Theo Ratliff | 6 ft 10 in (2.08 m) | 235 lb (107 kg) | | Wyoming |
| F | 12 | Tyrus Thomas | 6 ft 10 in (2.08 m) | 225 lb (102 kg) | | LSU |
| F | 3 | Gerald Wallace | 6 ft 7 in (2.01 m) | 220 lb (100 kg) | | Alabama |

Coaches
Head coach
- Larry Brown (North Carolina)
Assistant(s)
- Herb Brown (Vermont)
- Jeff Capel (Fayetteville State)
- Phil Ford (North Carolina)
- Dave Hanners (North Carolina)
- LaSalle Thompson (Texas)

Legend
- (DP) Unsigned draft pick
- (FA) Free agent
- (S) Suspended
- Injured

== Pre-season ==
2009 pre-season game log
October: 2–6 (home: 2–3; road: 0–3)

| Game | Date | Team | Score | High points | High rebounds | High assists | Location Attendance | Record |
|---|---|---|---|---|---|---|---|---|
| 1 | October 6 | @Cleveland Cavaliers | 87–92 | | | | 20,403 | 0–1 recap |
| 2 | October 8 | New Orleans Hornets | 101–108 | | | | 8,623 (Greensboro, North Carolina) | 1–1 recap |
| 3 | October 10 | Cleveland Cavaliers | 102–96 | | | | 11,489 (North Charleston, South Carolina) | 1–2 recap |
| 4 | October 12 | @Atlanta Hawks | 90–107 | | | | 6,960 | 1–3 recap |
| 5 | October 17 | @Los Angeles Lakers | 87–91 | | | | 18,422 | 1–4 recap |
| 6 | October 18 | Utah Jazz | 110–103 | | | | – (Los Angeles) | 1–5 recap |
| 7 | October 20 | Milwaukee Bucks | 87–94 | | | | 7,582 | 2–5 recap |
| 8 | October 23 | Memphis Grizzlies | 95–92 | | | | 19,077 | 2–6 recap |

2009–10 season schedule

== Regular season ==
=== Standings ===
| Southeast Division | W | L | PCT | GB | Home | Road | Div |
|---|---|---|---|---|---|---|---|
| y-Orlando Magic | 59 | 23 | .720 | – | 34–7 | 25–16 | 10–6 |
| x-Atlanta Hawks | 53 | 29 | .646 | 6 | 34–7 | 19–22 | 8–8 |
| x-Miami Heat | 47 | 35 | .573 | 12 | 24–17 | 23–18 | 9–7 |
| x-Charlotte Bobcats | 44 | 38 | .537 | 15 | 31–10 | 13–28 | 10–6 |
| Washington Wizards | 26 | 56 | .317 | 33 | 15–26 | 11–30 | 3–13 |

| # | Eastern Conference | | | | |
| # | Team | W | L | PCT | GB |
|---|---|---|---|---|---|
| 1 | z-Cleveland Cavaliers | 61 | 21 | .744 | – |
| 2 | y-Orlando Magic | 59 | 23 | .720 | 2 |
| 3 | x-Atlanta Hawks | 53 | 29 | .646 | 8 |
| 4 | y-Boston Celtics | 50 | 32 | .610 | 11 |
| 5 | x-Miami Heat | 47 | 35 | .573 | 14 |
| 6 | x-Milwaukee Bucks | 46 | 36 | .561 | 15 |
| 7 | x-Charlotte Bobcats | 44 | 38 | .537 | 17 |
| 8 | x-Chicago Bulls | 41 | 41 | .500 | 20 |
| 9 | Toronto Raptors | 40 | 42 | .488 | 21 |
| 10 | Indiana Pacers | 32 | 50 | .390 | 29 |
| 11 | New York Knicks | 29 | 53 | .354 | 32 |
| 12 | Philadelphia 76ers | 27 | 55 | .329 | 34 |
| 13 | Detroit Pistons | 27 | 55 | .329 | 34 |
| 14 | Washington Wizards | 26 | 56 | .317 | 35 |
| 15 | New Jersey Nets | 12 | 70 | .146 | 49 |

=== Game log ===
2009–10 game log
Total: 44–38 (home: 31–10; road: 13–28)
October: 1–2 (home: 1–0; road: 0–2)

| Game | Date | Team | Score | High points | High rebounds | High assists | Location Attendance | Record |
|---|---|---|---|---|---|---|---|---|
| 1 | October 28 | @ Boston | L 59–92 | Gerald Wallace (10) | Gerald Wallace (12) | D. J. Augustin (4) | TD Garden; 18,624 | 0–1 |
| 2 | October 30 | New York | W 102–100 | Raymond Felton (22) | Gerald Wallace (15) | Raymond Felton (9) | Time Warner Cable Arena; 18,624 | 1–1 |
| 3 | October 31 | @ Cleveland | L 79–90 | Vladimir Radmanović (12) | Gerald Wallace (9) | Boris Diaw (9) | Quicken Loans Arena; 20,562 | 1–2 |

November: 6–7 (home: 5–2; road: 1–5)

| Game | Date | Team | Score | High points | High rebounds | High assists | Location Attendance | Record |
|---|---|---|---|---|---|---|---|---|
| 4 | November 2 | New Jersey | W 79–68 | Gerald Wallace (24) | Gerald Wallace (20) | Boris Diaw, Raymond Felton (3) | Time Warner Cable Arena; 9,380 | 2–2 |
| 5 | November 6 | Atlanta | W 103–83 | Raja Bell (24) | Tyson Chandler (10) | Raymond Felton (7) | Time Warner Cable Arena; 15,874 | 3–2 |
| 6 | November 7 | @ Chicago | L 90–93 | Boris Diaw (20) | Gerald Wallace (9) | Raymond Felton (10) | United Center; 21,108 | 3-3 |
| 7 | November 10 | Orlando | L 81–93 | Raymond Felton (18) | Gerald Wallace (9) | Boris Diaw (8) | Time Warner Cable Arena; 13,415 | 3–4 |
| 8 | November 11 | @ Detroit | L 75–98 | Nazr Mohammed (13) | Nazr Mohammed (8) | Raymond Felton, Boris Diaw (4) | The Palace of Auburn Hills; 15,417 | 3–5 |
| 9 | November 14 | Portland | L 74–80 | Boris Diaw (21) | Gerald Wallace, Tyson Chandler (8) | Raymond Felton, Boris Diaw (4) | Time Warner Cable Arena; 15,872 | 3–6 |
| 10 | November 16 | @ Orlando | L 91–97 | Ronald Murray (31) | Gerald Wallace, Stephen Jackson (9) | Raymond Felton (5) | Amway Arena; 17,461 | 3–7 |
| 11 | November 18 | @ Philadelphia | L 84–86 | Stephen Jackson (26) | Gerald Wallace (12) | Raymond Felton, Stephen Jackson (5) | Wachovia Center; 11,585 | 3–8 |
| 12 | November 20 | @ Milwaukee | L 88–95 | Stephen Jackson, Gerald Wallace (22) | Gerald Wallace (10) | Ronald Murray (6) | Bradley Center; 15,578 | 3–9 |
| 13 | November 22 | Indiana | W 104–88 | Boris Diaw (17) | Gerald Wallace (11) | Raymond Felton (6) | Time Warner Cable Arena; 14,730 | 4–9 |
| 14 | November 25 | Toronto | W 116–81 | Gerald Wallace (31) | Gerald Wallace (13) | Stephen Jackson (6) | Time Warner Cable Arena; 13,689 | 5–9 |
| 15 | November 27 | Cleveland | W 94–87 | Gerald Wallace (31) | Gerald Wallace (14) | Raymond Felton (7) | Time Warner Cable Arena; 19,168 | 6–9 |
| 16 | November 28 | @ Washington | W 92–76 | Gerald Wallace (14) | Gerald Wallace (14) | Boris Diaw (6) | Verizon Center; 17,311 | 7–9 |

December: 5–9 (home: 5–2; road: 0–7)

| Game | Date | Team | Score | High points | High rebounds | High assists | Location Attendance | Record |
|---|---|---|---|---|---|---|---|---|
| 17 | December 1 | Boston | L 90–108 | Nazr Mohammed (16) | Gerald Wallace (8) | Raymond Felton (5) | Time Warner Cable Arena; 15,129 | 7–10 |
| 18 | December 4 | @ New Jersey | L 91–97 | Stephen Jackson, Raymond Felton (28) | Gerald Wallace (20) | Boris Diaw (6) | Izod Center; 12,131 | 7–11 |
| 19 | December 5 | Philadelphia | W 106–105 | Boris Diaw (28) | Gerald Wallace (14) | Raymond Felton (8) | Time Warner Cable Arena; 13,352 | 8–11 |
| 20 | December 8 | Denver | W 107–95 | Stephen Jackson, Gerald Wallace (25) | Gerald Wallace (16) | Stephen Jackson (6) | Time Warner Cable Arena; 14,127 | 9–11 |
| 21 | December 11 | @ San Antonio | L 85–104 | Stephen Jackson (23) | Gerald Wallace (6) | Raymond Felton (5) | AT&T Center; 17,508 | 9–12 |
| 22 | December 12 | @ Dallas | L 97–98 (OT) | Stephen Jackson (28) | Gerald Wallace (16) | Raymond Felton (8) | American Airlines Center; 20,151 | 9–13 |
| 23 | December 15 | New York | W 94–87 | Stephen Jackson (24) | Tyson Chandler (12) | Raymond Felton (6) | Time Warner Cable Arena; 13,606 | 10–13 |
| 24 | December 16 | @ Indiana | L 98–101 | Gerald Wallace (29) | Tyson Chandler (13) | D. J. Augustin (6) | Conseco Fieldhouse; 11,888 | 10–14 |
| 25 | December 19 | Utah | L 102–110 | Gerald Wallace (30) | Gerald Wallace (13) | Gerald Wallace, Boris Diaw (5) | Time Warner Cable Arena; 14,963 | 10–15 |
| 26 | December 20 | @ New York | L 94–98 | Raymond Felton (27) | Tyson Chandler (14) | Raymond Felton (7) | Madison Square Garden; 18,767 | 10–16 |
| 27 | December 22 | Detroit | W 88–76 | Gerald Wallace (29) | Gerald Wallace (12) | Raymond Felton (8) | Time Warner Cable Arena; 16,864 | 11–16 |
| 28 | December 26 | @ Oklahoma City | L 91–98 | Stephen Jackson (24) | Stephen Jackson, Nazr Mohammed (8) | Stephen Jackson, Raymond Felton (5) | Ford Center; 17,961 | 11–17 |
| 29 | December 28 | Milwaukee | W 94–84 | Gerald Wallace (21) | Gerald Wallace (14) | Boris Diaw (5) | Time Warner Cable Arena; 15,473 | 12–17 |
| 30 | December 30 | @ Toronto | L 103–107 | Stephen Jackson (30) | Gerald Wallace (16) | Stephen Jackson (5) | Air Canada Centre; 18,979 | 12–18 |

January: 12–4 (home: 7–1; road: 5–3)

| Game | Date | Team | Score | High points | High rebounds | High assists | Location Attendance | Record |
|---|---|---|---|---|---|---|---|---|
| 31 | January 2 | @ Miami | W 107–97 | Stephen Jackson (35) | Stephen Jackson, Gerald Wallace (8) | Raymond Felton (6) | American Airlines Arena; 17,856 | 13–18 |
| 32 | January 3 | @ Cleveland | W 91–88 | Stephen Jackson (22) | Gerald Wallace (12) | Raymond Felton, Boris Diaw (6) | Quicken Loans Arena; 20,562 | 14–18 |
| 33 | January 5 | Chicago | W 113–108 | Gerald Wallace (32) | Gerald Wallace (9) | Raymond Felton, Boris Diaw (6) | Time Warner Cable Arena; 13,749 | 15–18 |
| 34 | January 7 | @ New York | L 93–97 | Stephen Jackson (26) | Gerald Wallace (9) | Raymond Felton (9) | Madison Square Garden; 19,763 | 15–19 |
| 35 | January 9 | Memphis | W 89–87 | Raymond Felton (19) | Boris Diaw (10) | Boris Diaw (6) | Time Warner Cable Arena; 15,438 | 16–19 |
| 36 | January 12 | Houston | W 102–94 | Stephen Jackson (43) | Stephen Jackson, Gerald Wallace (8) | Boris Diaw (6) | Time Warner Cable Arena; 11,463 | 17–19 |
| 37 | January 15 | San Antonio | W 92–76 | Boris Diaw(26) | Boris Diaw (11) | D. J. Augustin (7) | Time Warner Cable Arena; 15,742 | 18–19 |
| 38 | January 16 | Phoenix | W 125–99 | Gerald Wallace, Stephen Jackson (29) | Gerald Wallace (13) | Stephen Jackson (8) | Time Warner Cable Arena; 17,574 | 19-19 |
| 39 | January 18 | Sacramento | W 105–103 | Gerald Wallace (28) | Raymond Felton (9) | Raymond Felton (10) | Time Warner Cable Arena; 13,678 | 20–19 |
| 40 | January 20 | Miami | W 104–65 | Stephen Jackson (24) | Gerald Wallace, Nazr Mohammed (10) | Raymond Felton (5) | Time Warner Cable Arena; 14,212 | 21–19 |
| 41 | January 22 | @ Atlanta | L 89–103 | Gerald Wallace (25) | Nazr Mohammed, Gerald Wallace, Stephen Jackson (6) | Ronald Murray (9) | Philips Arena; 14,701 | 21–20 |
| 42 | January 23 | Orlando | L 95–106 (OT) | D. J. Augustin (22) | Gerald Wallace, Boris Diaw (10) | Boris Diaw (5) | Time Warner Cable Arena; 19,277 | 21-21 |
| 43 | January 25 | @ Denver | L 93–104 | Stephen Jackson (22) | Gerald Wallace (7) | Raymond Felton (9) | Pepsi Center; 16,909 | 21–22 |
| 44 | January 26 | @ Phoenix | W 114–109 (OT) | Stephen Jackson (30) | Boris Diaw (11) | Stephen Jackson, Boris Diaw (5) | US Airways Center; 15,722 | 22-22 |
| 45 | January 29 | @ Golden State | W 121–110 | Gerald Wallace, Stephen Jackson (30) | Gerald Wallace (13) | D. J. Augustin, Raymond Felton (6) | Oracle Arena; 17,850 | 23–22 |
| 46 | January 30 | @ Sacramento | W 103–96 | Gerald Wallace (38) | Gerald Wallace (11) | Stephen Jackson (8) | ARCO Arena; 14,186 | 24–22 |

February: 4–7 (home: 2–2; road: 2–5)

| Game | Date | Team | Score | High points | High rebounds | High assists | Location Attendance | Record |
|---|---|---|---|---|---|---|---|---|
| 47 | February 1 | @ Portland | L 79–98 | Raymond Felton (23) | Gerald Wallace (10) | Stephen Jackson (4) | Rose Garden; 20,106 | 24–23 |
| 48 | February 3 | @ L.A. Lakers | L 97–99 | Stephen Jackson (30) | Nazr Mohammed (17) | Boris Diaw (5) | Staples Center; 18,997 | 24-24 |
| 49 | February 6 | New Orleans | L 99–104 | Stephen Jackson (26) | Boris Diaw (8) | Raymond Felton (7) | Time Warner Cable Arena; 19,164 | 24–25 |
| 50 | February 9 | Washington | W 94–92 | Stephen Jackson (22) | Nazr Mohammed (10) | Raymond Felton (5) | Time Warner Cable Arena; 12,376 | 25-25 |
| 51 | February 10 | @ Minnesota | W 93–92 | Stephen Jackson (33) | Nazr Mohammed (20) | D. J. Augustin (7) | Target Center; 13,352 | 26–25 |
| 52 | February 16 | New Jersey | L 94–103 | Gerald Wallace (21) | Gerald Wallace, Boris Diaw (10) | Stephen Jackson (5) | Time Warner Cable Arena; 13,712 | 26-26 |
| 53 | February 19 | Cleveland | W 110–93 | Stephen Jackson (29) | Tyrus Thomas (12) | Boris Diaw (9) | Time Warner Cable Arena; 19,568 | 27–26 |
| 54 | February 20 | @ Milwaukee | L 88–93 | Stephen Jackson (35) | Tyrus Thomas (11) | Stephen Jackson (5) | Bradley Center; 17,174 | 27-27 |
| 55 | February 22 | @ L.A. Clippers | L 94–98 | Gerald Wallace (32) | Gerald Wallace (12) | Boris Diaw, Raymond Felton (9) | Staples Center; 15,892 | 27–28 |
| 56 | February 24 | @ Utah | L 93–102 | Gerald Wallace (27) | Gerald Wallace (8) | Raymond Felton (5) | EnergySolutions Arena; 19,911 | 27–29 |
| 57 | February 26 | @ Memphis | W 93–89 | Stephen Jackson (32) | Stephen Jackson (11) | Raymond Felton (7) | FedExForum; 14,713 | 28–29 |

March: 11–6 (home: 8–2; road: 3–4)

| Game | Date | Team | Score | High points | High rebounds | High assists | Location Attendance | Record |
|---|---|---|---|---|---|---|---|---|
| 58 | March 1 | Dallas | L 84–89 | Stephen Jackson (20) | Tyrus Thomas (12) | Raymond Felton (5) | Time Warner Cable Arena; 15,691 | 28–30 |
| 59 | March 3 | @ Boston | L 80–104 | Tyrus Thomas (15) | Tyrus Thomas (10) | Raymond Felton (6) | TD Garden; 18,624 | 28–31 |
| 60 | March 5 | L.A. Lakers | W 98–93 | Stephen Jackson (21) | Gerald Wallace (10) | D. J. Augustin, Boris Diaw (5) | Time Warner Cable Arena; 19,568 | 29–31 |
| 61 | March 6 | Golden State | W 101–90 | D. J. Augustin (19) | Boris Diaw (12) | Boris Diaw (9) | Time Warner Cable Arena; 19,392 | 30–31 |
| 62 | March 9 | Miami | W 83–78 | Stephen Jackson (17) | Gerald Wallace (17) | Raymond Felton (11) | Time Warner Cable Arena; 18,646 | 31-31 |
| 63 | March 10 | @ Philadelphia | W 102–87 | Gerald Wallace (28) | Stephen Jackson (10) | Raymond Felton (6) | Wachovia Center; 11,358 | 32–31 |
| 64 | March 12 | L.A. Clippers | W 106–98 | Stephen Jackson (24) | Tyson Chandler (9) | Raymond Felton (11) | Time Warner Cable Arena; 15,835 | 33–31 |
| 65 | March 14 | @ Orlando | W 96–89 | Stephen Jackson (28) | Theo Ratliff, Tyrus Thomas (9) | Raymond Felton (7) | Amway Arena; 17,461 | 34–31 |
| 66 | March 16 | @ Indiana | L 94–99 | Boris Diaw, Stephen Jackson (20) | Stephen Jackson (9) | Raymond Felton, Stephen Jackson (6) | Conseco Fieldhouse; 10,850 | 34–32 |
| 67 | March 17 | Oklahoma City | W 100–92 | Stephen Jackson (20) | Tyrus Thomas (9) | Raymond Felton (7) | Time Warner Cable Arena; 16,179 | 35–32 |
| 68 | March 19 | @ Atlanta | L 92–93 (OT) | Raymond Felton (25) | Gerald Wallace (16) | Boris Diaw (6) | Philips Arena; 17,697 | 35–33 |
| 69 | March 20 | @ Miami | L 71–77 | Stephen Jackson (18) | Tyson Chandler (11) | Raymond Felton (5) | American Airlines Arena; 18,766 | 35–34 |
| 70 | March 23 | @ Washington | W 95–86 (OT) | Gerald Wallace, Boris Diaw (17) | Gerald Wallace (19) | Raymond Felton (5) | Verizon Center; 12,742 | 36–34 |
| 71 | March 24 | Minnesota | W 108–95 | Stephen Jackson (37) | Tyson Chandler (9) | Raymond Felton (8) | Time Warner Cable Arena; 14,457 | 37–34 |
| 72 | March 26 | Washington | W 107–96 | Gerald Wallace (23) | Gerald Wallace (6) | Raymond Felton (11) | Time Warner Cable Arena; 16,365 | 38–34 |
| 73 | March 29 | Toronto | L 101–103 | Stephen Jackson, Raymond Felton (18) | Gerald Wallace (8) | Boris Diaw, Raymond Felton (7) | Time Warner Cable Arena; 14,534 | 38–35 |
| 74 | March 31 | Philadelphia | W 103–84 | Gerald Wallace (24) | Gerald Wallace (12) | Raymond Felton (6) | Time Warner Cable Arena; 14,139 | 39–35 |

April: 5–3 (home: 3–1; road: 2–2)

| Game | Date | Team | Score | High points | High rebounds | High assists | Location Attendance | Record |
|---|---|---|---|---|---|---|---|---|
| 75 | April 2 | Milwaukee | W 87–86 (OT) | Stephen Jackson (32) | Gerald Wallace (11) | Raymond Felton (6) | Time Warner Cable Arena; 18,118 | 40–35 |
| 76 | April 3 | @ Chicago | L 88–96 | Boris Diaw (18) | Boris Diaw (7) | Boris Diaw (6) | United Center; 20,996 | 40–36 |
| 77 | April 6 | Atlanta | W 109–100 | Gerald Wallace (28) | Boris Diaw (9) | Boris Diaw (9) | Time Warner Cable Arena; 18,610 | 41–36 |
| 78 | April 7 | @ New Orleans | W 104–103 | Stephen Jackson (29) | Tyson Chandler (10) | Raymond Felton (7) | New Orleans Arena; 13,333 | 42–36 |
| 79 | April 9 | @ Houston | L 90–97 | Gerald Wallace, Boris Diaw (18) | Tyson Chandler (12) | Boris Diaw, Raymond Felton (5) | Toyota Center; 16,488 | 42–37 |
| 80 | April 10 | Detroit | W 99–95 | Larry Hughes (18) | Stephen Jackson, Theo Ratliff (6) | D. J. Augustin (9) | Time Warner Cable Arena; 19,328 | 43–37 |
| 81 | April 12 | @ New Jersey | W 105–95 | Stephen Jackson (17) | Stephen Jackson (9) | Raymond Felton (8) | Izod Center; 14,118 | 44–37 |
| 82 | April 14 | Chicago | L 89–98 | Tyrus Thomas (16) | Tyrus Thomas (9) | Raymond Felton (5) | Time Warner Cable Arena; 17,439 | 44–38 |

2009–10 season schedule

== Playoffs ==
=== Game log ===
2010 playoff game log
Total: 0–4 (home: 0–2; road: 0–2)
First Round: 0–4 (home: 0–2; road: 0–2)

| Game | Date | Team | Score | High points | High rebounds | High assists | Location Attendance | Series |
|---|---|---|---|---|---|---|---|---|
| 1 | April 18 | @Orlando | L 89–98 | Gerald Wallace (25) | Gerald Wallace (17) | Raymond Felton (4) | Amway Arena; 17,461 | 0–1 |
| 2 | April 21 | @Orlando | L 77–92 | Stephen Jackson (27) | Boris Diaw (7) | Boris Diaw (4); Raymond Felton (4) | Amway Arena; 17,461 | 0–2 |
| 3 | April 24 | Orlando | L 86–90 | Stephen Jackson (19) | Gerald Wallace (8) | Boris Diaw (6); Raymond Felton (6) | Time Warner Cable Arena; 19,596 | 0–3 |
| 4 | April 26 | Orlando | L 90–99 | Tyrus Thomas (21) | Tyrus Thomas (9) | Stephen Jackson (8) | Time Warner Cable Arena; 19,086 | 0–4 |

2010 playoff schedule

== Player statistics ==
=== Regular season ===
| Player | POS | GP | GS | MP | REB | AST | STL | BLK | PTS | MPG | RPG | APG | SPG | BPG | PPG |
|---|---|---|---|---|---|---|---|---|---|---|---|---|---|---|---|
| Boris Diaw | PF | 82 | 82 | 2,906 | 424 | 325 | 60 | 57 | 925 | 35.4 | 5.2 | 4.0 | .7 | .7 | 11.3 |
| Raymond Felton | PG | 80 | 80 | 2,643 | 288 | 446 | 123 | 22 | 968 | 33.0 | 3.6 | 5.6 | 1.5 | .3 | 12.1 |
| D. J. Augustin | PG | 80 | 2 | 1,472 | 97 | 193 | 45 | 5 | 508 | 18.4 | 1.2 | 2.4 | .6 | .1 | 6.4 |
| Gerald Wallace | SF | 76 | 76 | 3,119 | 762 | 161 | 117 | 83 | 1,386 | 41.0 | 10.0 | 2.1 | 1.5 | 1.1 | 18.2 |
| Stephen Jackson^{†} | SG | 72 | 72 | 2,829 | 366 | 258 | 118 | 37 | 1,518 | 39.3 | 5.1 | 3.6 | 1.6 | .5 | 21.1 |
| Stephen Graham | SG | 70 | 8 | 804 | 135 | 23 | 20 | 10 | 296 | 11.5 | 1.9 | .3 | .3 | .1 | 4.2 |
| Nazr Mohammed | C | 58 | 29 | 984 | 304 | 28 | 15 | 43 | 459 | 17.0 | 5.2 | .5 | .3 | .7 | 7.9 |
| Derrick Brown | SF | 57 | 0 | 535 | 78 | 19 | 21 | 10 | 186 | 9.4 | 1.4 | .3 | .4 | .2 | 3.3 |
| Tyson Chandler | C | 51 | 27 | 1,163 | 320 | 16 | 17 | 55 | 333 | 22.8 | 6.3 | .3 | .3 | 1.1 | 6.5 |
| Ronald Murray^{†} | SG | 46 | 1 | 993 | 98 | 84 | 28 | 12 | 454 | 21.6 | 2.1 | 1.8 | .6 | .3 | 9.9 |
| Gerald Henderson Jr. | SG | 43 | 0 | 355 | 55 | 13 | 10 | 9 | 113 | 8.3 | 1.3 | .3 | .2 | .2 | 2.6 |
| Theo Ratliff^{†} | C | 28 | 26 | 624 | 117 | 16 | 9 | 43 | 144 | 22.3 | 4.2 | .6 | .3 | 1.5 | 5.1 |
| DeSagana Diop | C | 27 | 0 | 262 | 65 | 5 | 5 | 14 | 32 | 9.7 | 2.4 | .2 | .2 | .5 | 1.2 |
| Tyrus Thomas^{†} | C | 25 | 0 | 542 | 152 | 23 | 23 | 37 | 252 | 21.7 | 6.1 | .9 | .9 | 1.5 | 10.1 |
| Larry Hughes^{†} | SG | 14 | 2 | 295 | 32 | 28 | 12 | 4 | 114 | 21.1 | 2.3 | 2.0 | .9 | .3 | 8.1 |
| Acie Law^{†} | PG | 9 | 0 | 33 | 1 | 3 | 1 | 1 | 16 | 3.7 | .1 | .3 | .1 | .1 | 1.8 |
| Vladimir Radmanović^{†} | PF | 8 | 0 | 133 | 29 | 7 | 3 | 1 | 39 | 16.6 | 3.6 | .9 | .4 | .1 | 4.9 |
| Alexis Ajinça | C | 6 | 0 | 30 | 4 | 0 | 1 | 1 | 10 | 5.0 | .7 | .0 | .2 | .2 | 1.7 |
| Raja Bell^{†} | SG | 5 | 5 | 157 | 21 | 10 | 4 | 2 | 60 | 31.4 | 4.2 | 2.0 | .8 | .4 | 12.0 |

- ^{†} Denotes player spent time with another team in the season. Stats reflect time with the Bobcats only.

=== Playoffs ===
| Player | POS | GP | GS | MP | REB | AST | STL | BLK | PTS | MPG | RPG | APG | SPG | BPG | PPG |
|---|---|---|---|---|---|---|---|---|---|---|---|---|---|---|---|
| Gerald Wallace | SF | 4 | 4 | 164 | 36 | 9 | 5 | 6 | 70 | 41.0 | 9.0 | 2.3 | 1.3 | 1.5 | 17.5 |
| Stephen Jackson | SG | 4 | 4 | 156 | 20 | 15 | 5 | 1 | 72 | 39.0 | 5.0 | 3.8 | 1.3 | .3 | 18.0 |
| Boris Diaw | PF | 4 | 4 | 152 | 20 | 16 | 1 | 3 | 30 | 38.0 | 5.0 | 4.0 | .3 | .8 | 7.5 |
| Raymond Felton | PG | 4 | 4 | 130 | 10 | 20 | 2 | 0 | 47 | 32.5 | 2.5 | 5.0 | .5 | .0 | 11.8 |
| Theo Ratliff | C | 4 | 4 | 47 | 3 | 1 | 2 | 0 | 7 | 11.8 | .8 | .3 | .5 | .0 | 1.8 |
| D. J. Augustin | PG | 4 | 0 | 73 | 4 | 7 | 1 | 1 | 17 | 18.3 | 1.0 | 1.8 | .3 | .3 | 4.3 |
| Tyrus Thomas | C | 4 | 0 | 68 | 22 | 2 | 2 | 2 | 35 | 17.0 | 5.5 | .5 | .5 | .5 | 8.8 |
| Tyson Chandler | C | 4 | 0 | 60 | 10 | 2 | 2 | 3 | 14 | 15.0 | 2.5 | .5 | .5 | .8 | 3.5 |
| Larry Hughes | SG | 4 | 0 | 58 | 13 | 6 | 0 | 0 | 24 | 14.5 | 3.3 | 1.5 | .0 | .0 | 6.0 |
| Nazr Mohammed | C | 4 | 0 | 48 | 8 | 2 | 1 | 2 | 24 | 12.0 | 2.0 | .5 | .3 | .5 | 6.0 |
| Stephen Graham | SG | 2 | 0 | 5 | 0 | 1 | 1 | 0 | 0 | 2.5 | .0 | .5 | .5 | .0 | .0 |
| Derrick Brown | SF | 2 | 0 | 1 | 0 | 0 | 0 | 0 | 2 | .5 | .0 | .0 | .0 | .0 | 1.0 |

== Awards, records and milestones ==
=== Awards ===
==== All-Star ====
- Gerald Wallace was selected to his first All-Star game and the first selection for a Bobcat player in team history. He also competed in the Slam Dunk contest.

=== Records ===
First Bobcats team to make it to the postseason.

=== Milestones ===
The Bobcats made the playoffs for the first time ever, had a winning record for the first time ever, and had an NBA All-Star (Wallace) for the first time ever. They broke (and as of April 10 continue to set) a franchise record for wins in a season with 42, setting them for an above-.500 season. They clinched their first ever playoff berth April 8.

== Transactions ==
Charlotte Bobcats
Players Added

Via Draft

- Gerald Henderson
- Derrick Brown

Via Trade

- Tyrus Thomas (From Bulls)
- Theo Ratliff (From Spurs)
- Stephen Jackson (From Warriors)
- Acie Law (From Warriors)

Via Free Agency

- Larry Hughes
Players Lost

Via Trade

- Acie Law (To Bulls)
- Flip Murray (To Bulls)
- Robert Vaden (To Thunder)
- Raja Bell (To Warriors)
- Vladimir Radmanovic (To Warriors)

Via Free Agency

- Sean May (To Kings)
- Cartier Martin (To Italy)
