= Bob Cousy Award =

College basketball award

- Awarded for: the nation's top point guard in NCAA men's basketball
- Country: United States
- Presented by: Naismith Memorial Basketball Hall of Fame

History
- First award: 2004
- Most recent: Darius Acuff Jr., Arkansas
- Website: Official website

The Bob Cousy Award, sponsored by the College of the Holy Cross, is an annual basketball award given by the Naismith Memorial Basketball Hall of Fame to the top men's collegiate point guard. It is named after six-time National Basketball Association (NBA) champion Bob Cousy, who played point guard for the Boston Celtics from 1950 to 1963. Cousy won all of his championships with the Celtics.

Annually, a list of players is nominated by college head coaches, members of College Sports Communicators (CSC), and members of the National Association of Basketball Coaches (NABC). A screening committee of CSC members reviews the nominations, and selects 16 players from each division (12 from National Collegiate Athletic Association (NCAA) Division I, and two each from Division II and III). A selection committee appointed by the Hall then selects the winner. This 30-member committee is composed of Hall of Famers, head coaches, sports information directors, the media, and Cousy himself.

== Key ==
*	Awarded a national player of the year award that same season: Sporting News; Oscar Robertson Trophy; Associated Press; NABC; Naismith; Wooden

== Winners ==
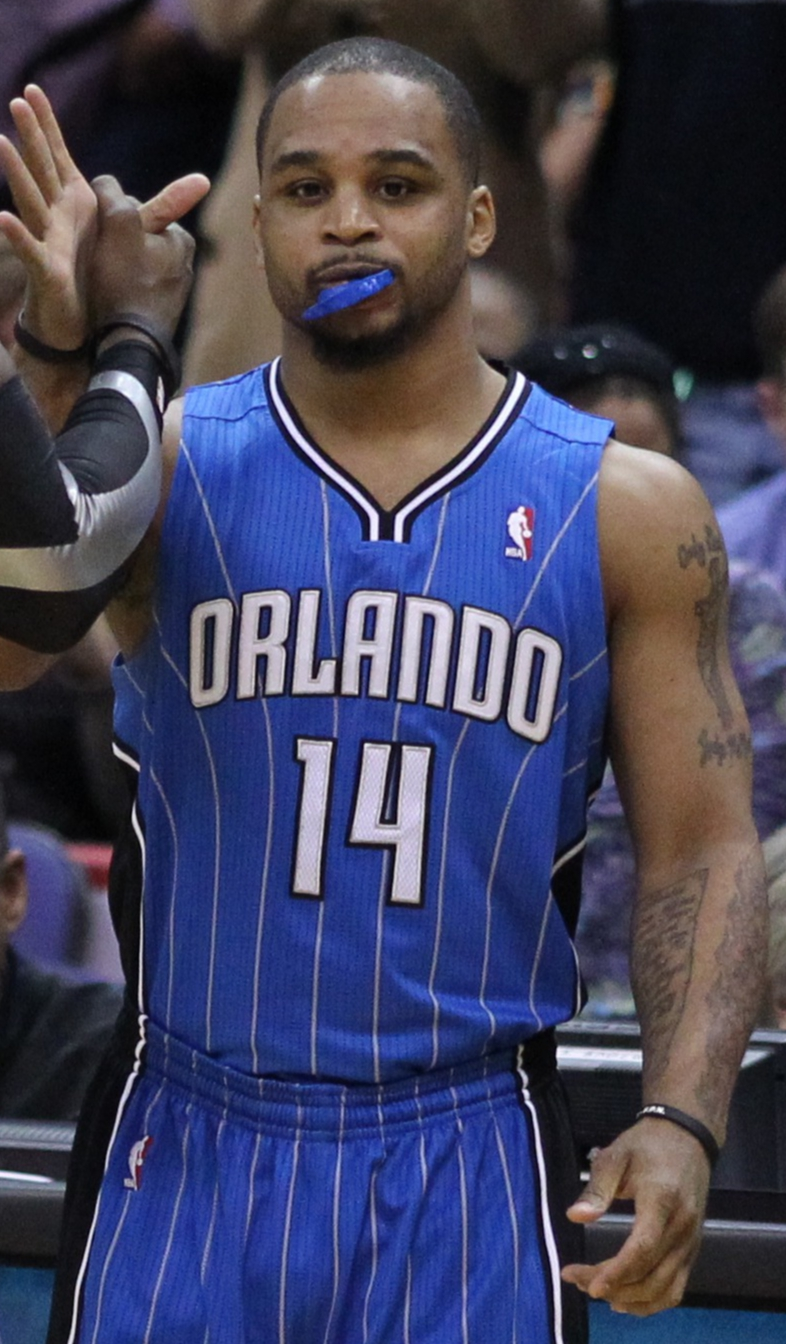
Jameer Nelson, Saint Joseph's, 2004

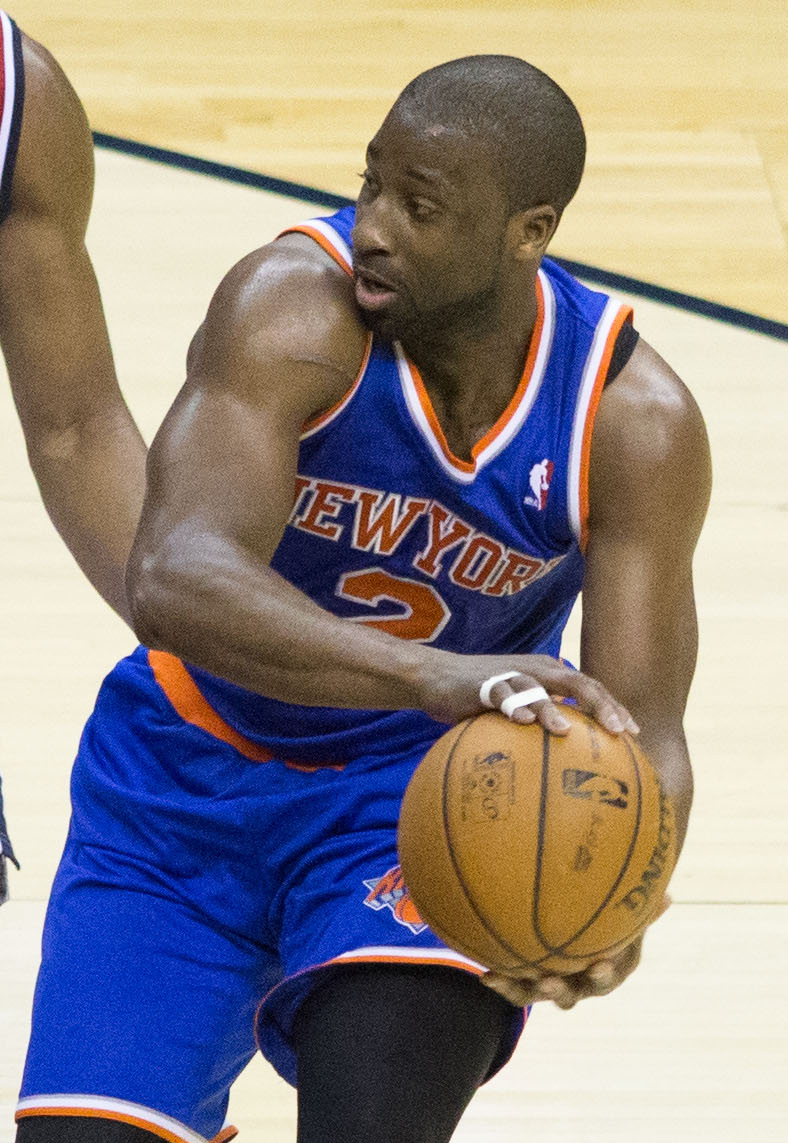
Raymond Felton, North Carolina, 2005

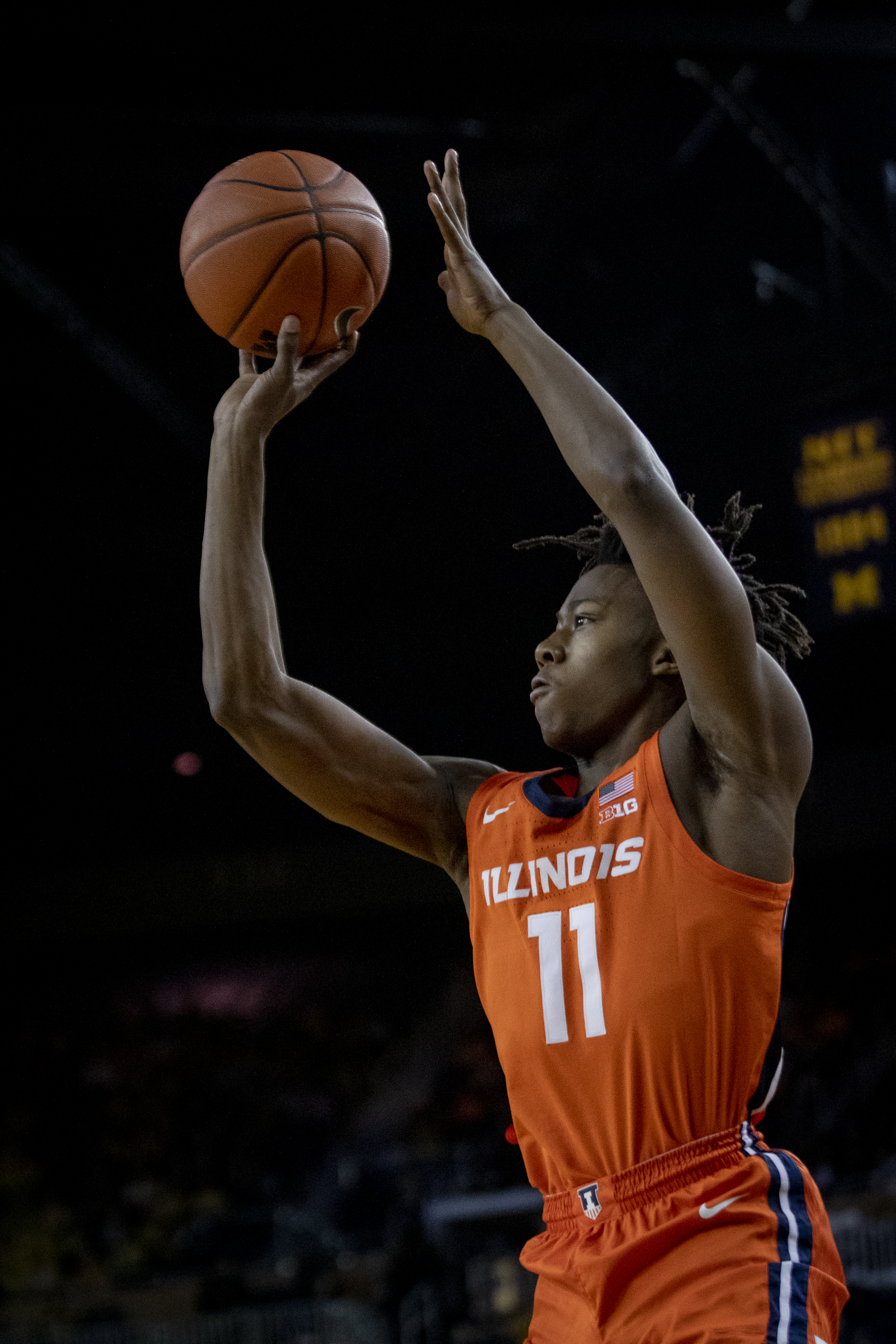
Ayo Dosunmu, Illinois, 2021

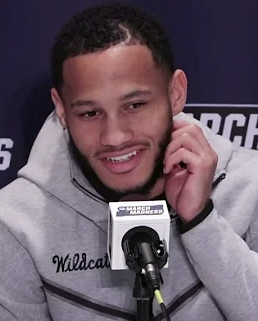
Markquis Nowell, Kansas State, 2023

Season	Player	School	Class	Reference
2003–04	Jameer Nelson*	Saint Joseph's	Senior	
2004–05	Raymond Felton	North Carolina	Junior	
2005–06	Dee Brown*	Illinois	Senior	
2006–07	Acie Law	Texas A&M	Senior	
2007–08	D. J. Augustin	Texas	Sophomore	
2008–09	Ty Lawson	North Carolina	Junior	
2009–10	Greivis Vásquez	Maryland	Senior	
2010–11	Kemba Walker	UConn	Junior	
2011–12	Kendall Marshall	North Carolina	Sophomore	
2012–13	Trey Burke*	Michigan	Sophomore	
2013–14	Shabazz Napier	UConn	Senior	
2014–15	Delon Wright	Utah	Senior	
2015–16	Tyler Ulis	Kentucky	Sophomore	
2016–17	Frank Mason III*	Kansas	Senior	
2017–18	Jalen Brunson*	Villanova	Junior	
2018–19	Ja Morant	Murray State	Sophomore	
2019–20	Payton Pritchard	Oregon	Senior	
2020–21	Ayo Dosunmu	Illinois	Junior	
2021–22	Collin Gillespie	Villanova	Graduate	
2022–23	Markquis Nowell	Kansas State	Senior	
2023–24	Tristen Newton	UConn	Senior	
2024–25	Braden Smith	Purdue	Junior	
2025–26	Darius Acuff Jr.	Arkansas	Freshman	

== See also ==
- Nancy Lieberman Award – the counterpart to the Bob Cousy Award given to the nation's top NCAA female point guard
