= Tyrus Thomas =

American basketball player (born 1986)

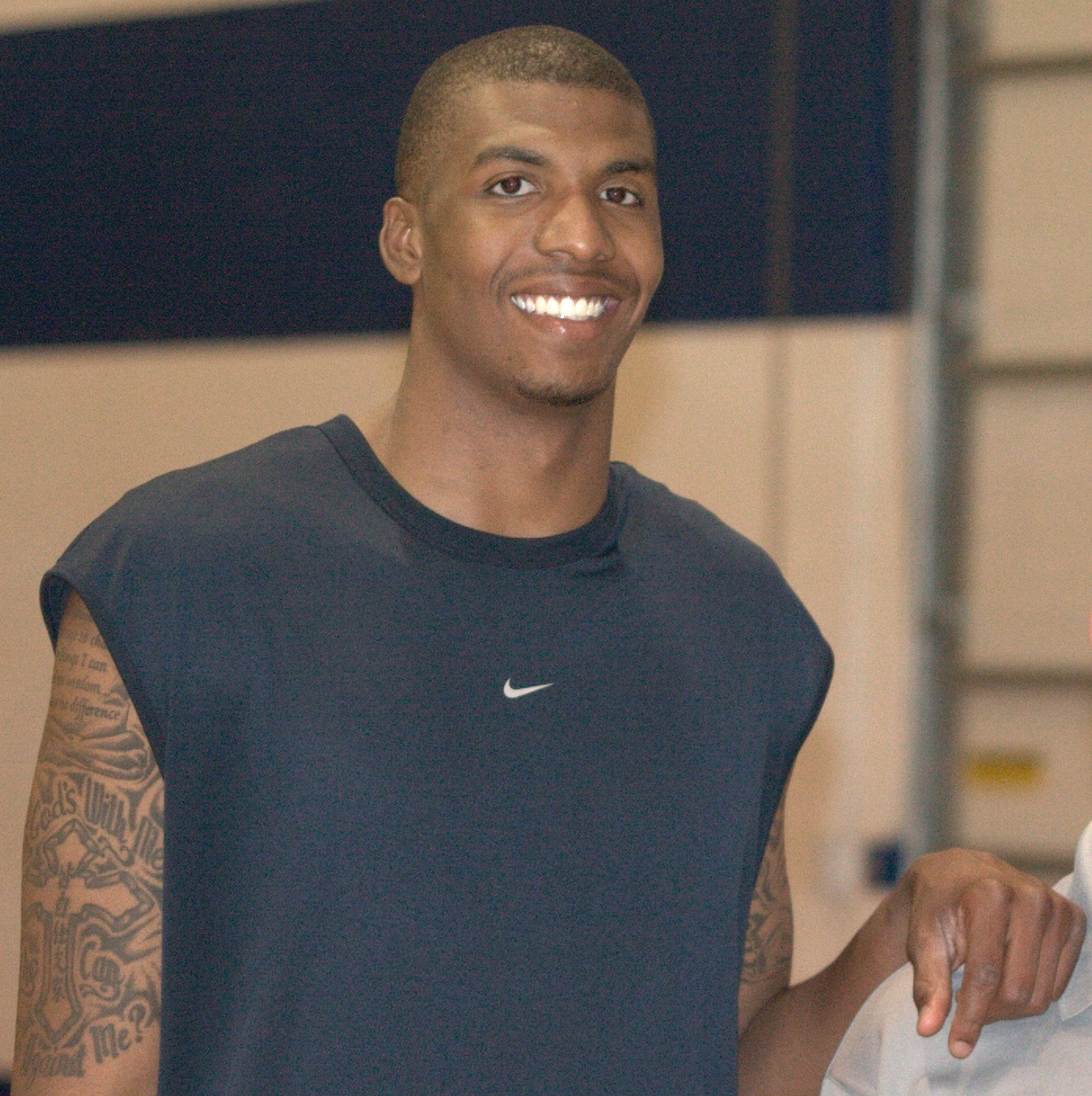
- Thomas in 2008

Personal information
- Born: August 17, 1986 (age 40) Baton Rouge, Louisiana, U.S.
- Listed height: 6 ft 10 in (2.08 m)
- Listed weight: 225 lb (102 kg)

Career information
- High school: McKinley (Baton Rouge, Louisiana)
- College: LSU (2005–2006)
- NBA draft: 2006: 1st round, 4th overall pick
- Drafted by: Portland Trail Blazers
- Playing career: 2006–2016
- Position: Power forward / center
- Number: 24, 12, 13

Career history
- 2006–2010: Chicago Bulls
- 2010–2013: Charlotte Bobcats
- 2015: Iowa Energy
- 2015: Memphis Grizzlies
- 2015–2016: Eisbären Bremerhaven

Career highlights
- NBA All-Rookie Second Team (2007); Second-team All-SEC (2006); SEC co-Defensive Player of the Year (2006); SEC Freshman of the Year (2006); SEC All-Freshman Team (2006)
- Stats at NBA.com
- Stats at Basketball Reference

Tyrus Wayne Thomas (born August 17, 1986) is an American former professional basketball player. He played college basketball for Louisiana State University (LSU) before being drafted fourth overall by the Portland Trail Blazers in the 2006 NBA draft. He was then traded to the Chicago Bulls where he went on to play three and a half seasons when in February 2010, he was traded to the Charlotte Bobcats. He spent a total of eight seasons in the NBA before retiring in 2016.

== High school career ==
As a 5'10" freshman, Thomas tried out for his varsity basketball team but was cut. He only played organized basketball in his last two years at McKinley High School in Baton Rouge, but never really built up enough recruiting hype to be considered a top 100 prospect. As a junior, he was a mere 6 ft 6 in (1.98 m) and 190 lb (86 kg), and when he officially committed to LSU, the school did not initially have a scholarship for him. One later opened up when a JUCO recruit was kicked off LSU's team and saw his scholarship offer rescinded. By senior year, Thomas had grown to 6 ft 7 in (2.01 m), 200 lb (91 kg). As a senior, Tyrus averaged 16 points, 12 rebounds and six blocks per game, earning him all-second team honors in Louisiana.

== College career ==
As a redshirted freshman at LSU in 2005–06, Thomas was the team's starting power forward, and because of his leaping ability, he developed a reputation as an outstanding shot blocker, rebounder and dunker. He was named the SEC Freshman of the Year after averaging 12.3 points, 9.2 rebounds and 3.1 blocks in 32 games (22 starts) while shooting over 60% from the field. Thomas was also recognized as the NCAA Atlanta Region MVP in the NCAA Tournament after combining for 30 points against the likes of Duke and Texas.

=== 2006 NCAA Tournament ===
Thomas entered the 2006 NCAA Tournament still recovering from a sprained ankle suffered in the February 26 game against Kentucky that caused him to miss the last two regular season games and the SEC Tournament. However, the injury did not hamper him as he continued the pattern of the regular season, his performances in the 2006 NCAA Tournament improved with every passing game as #4 seed LSU advanced to their first Final Four since 1986. His minutes were somewhat limited by the injury in the first-round game against No. 13 seed Iona and the second-round game against No. 12 seed Texas A&M but he was back to form by LSU's Atlanta Regional semi-final (Sweet 16) matchup against perennial power and overall top seed Duke. In the Duke game, Thomas recorded 9 points, 13 rebounds and 5 blocks despite being limited to 25 minutes due to early foul trouble as LSU held Duke to a 27.7 percent field goal percentage and only 54 points, the school's lowest output since 1996. Thomas was even more dominant in the Regional Final (Elite Eight) win against No. 2 seed Texas, recording 21 points, 13 rebounds and 3 blocks. These performances earned Thomas the Atlanta Regional's Most Valuable Player award.

== Professional career ==
=== Chicago Bulls (2006–2010) ===
On April 17, 2006, Thomas announced his intention to enter the NBA draft, and signed with an agent, removing his college eligibility. On June 28, 2006, Thomas was drafted fourth overall in the 2006 NBA draft by the Portland Trail Blazers. He was later traded to the Chicago Bulls for the second overall pick, LaMarcus Aldridge on draft night.

Thomas appeared in 72 games his rookie year, with four starts, and averaged 5.2 points, 3.7 rebounds and 1.1 blocks in 13.4 minutes per game. He participated in the Sprite Rising Stars Slam Dunk Contest, becoming the first Chicago Bulls representative since Scottie Pippen entered the contest in 1990. He tied a season-high 11 rebounds, including the game-winning tip-in with 0.2 seconds to play against Denver Nuggets on March 22. He then posted a career-high 27 points and grabbed eight rebounds against the Cleveland Cavaliers on March 31. He subsequently earned NBA All-Rookie second team honors.

Thomas appeared in 74 games his sophomore year, with 27 starts, and averaged 6.8 points, 4.6 rebounds, 1.2 assists and 1.0 blocks per game. He posted 21 points, 12 rebounds and 3 blocks in the second game of the season against the Philadelphia 76ers and went on to finish the season very strong in April with a 24-point performance against the Boston Celtics, a 20-point, 14-rebound performance against the Cleveland Cavaliers, and a 26-point performance in the season finale against the Toronto Raptors.

Thomas had a career-best season in 2008–09 as he averaged 10.8 points, 6.4 rebounds, 1.0 assists, 1.2 steals and 1.9 blocks in 79 games (61 starts).

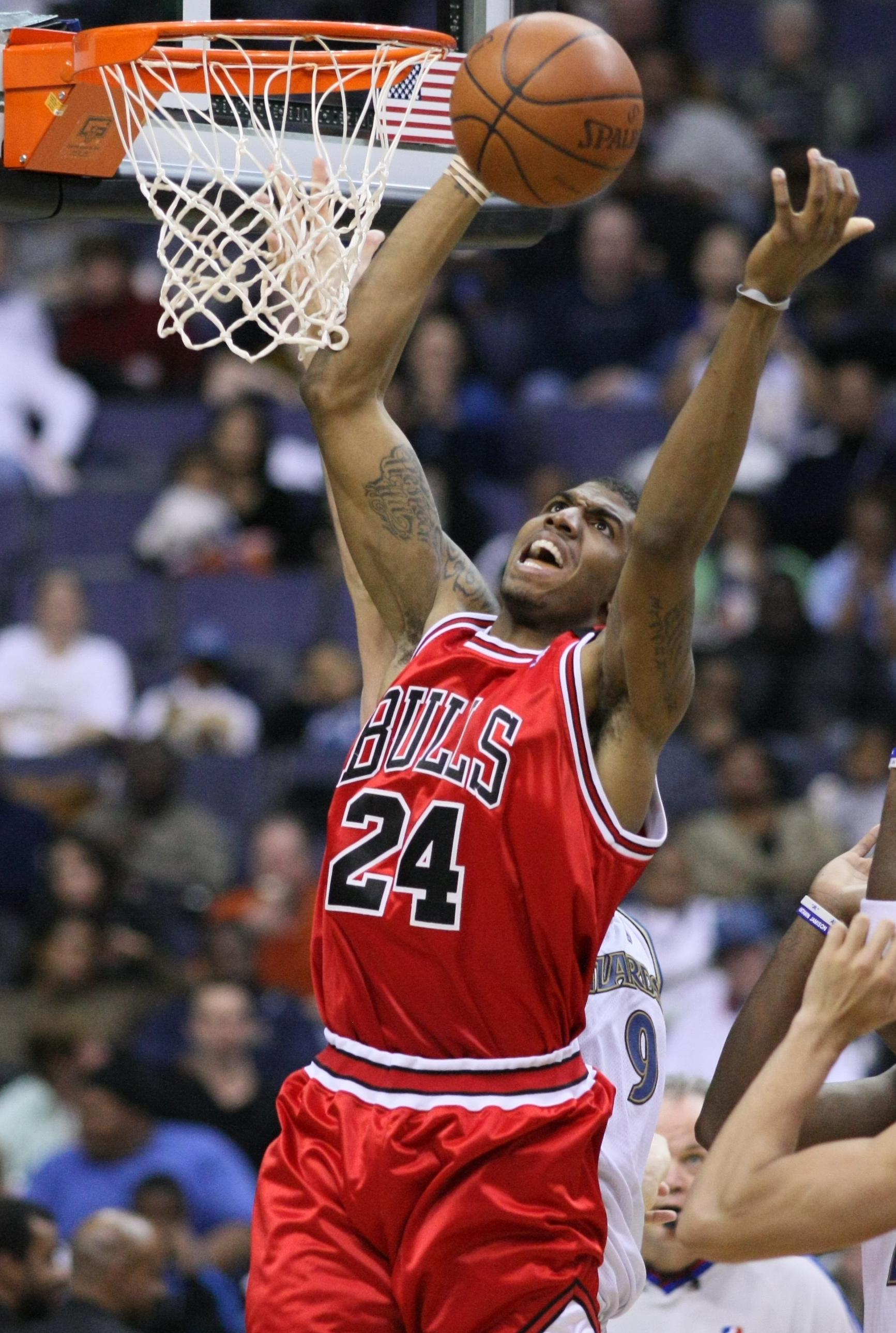
Thomas with the Chicago Bulls in February 2009.

After what was a career-best season for Thomas in 2008–09, he managed just four games for the Bulls in 2009–10 before fracturing his forearm during practice on November 6, putting him out for four to six weeks. He returned to action on December 26 and came off the bench behind rookie Taj Gibson.

=== Charlotte Bobcats (2010–2013) ===
On February 18, 2010, Thomas was traded to the Charlotte Bobcats in exchange for Ronald Murray, Acie Law and a future first-round draft pick.

On July 12, 2010, Thomas re-signed with the Bobcats to a five-year, $40 million deal.

On January 25, 2012, in a loss to the Washington Wizards, Thomas recorded a career-high 9 blocked shots, one shy of the franchise record.

On July 10, 2013, Thomas was waived by the Bobcats via the amnesty clause.

=== Iowa Energy (2015) ===
On January 13, 2015, Thomas was acquired by the Iowa Energy of the NBA Development League.

=== Memphis Grizzlies (2015) ===
On January 22, Thomas signed a 10-day contract with the Memphis Grizzlies.

=== Return to Iowa (2015) ===
Following the expiration of his contract on February 1, Thomas was not offered a second 10-day contract by the Grizzlies and subsequently returned to Iowa two days later.

=== Eisbären Bremerhaven (2015–2016) ===
On September 4, 2015, Thomas signed a one-year deal with Eisbären Bremerhaven of the Basketball Bundesliga. On February 26, 2016, he parted ways with Bremerhaven after averaging 3.6 points and 3.4 rebounds per game in Bundesliga.

== NBA career statistics ==
Legend
GP	Games played	GS	Games started	MPG	Minutes per game
FG%	Field goal percentage	3P%	3-point field goal percentage	FT%	Free throw percentage
RPG	Rebounds per game	APG	Assists per game	SPG	Steals per game
BPG	Blocks per game	PPG	Points per game	**Bold**	Career high

=== Regular season ===
Year	Team	GP	GS	MPG	FG%	3P%	FT%	RPG	APG	SPG	BPG	PPG
2006–07	Chicago	72	4	13.4	.475	.000	.606	3.7	.6	.6	1.1	5.2
2007–08	Chicago	74	27	18.0	.423	.167	.741	4.6	**1.2**	.6	1.0	6.8
2008–09	Chicago	**79**	**61**	**27.5**	.451	.333	.783	**6.5**	1.0	1.2	**1.9**	**10.8**
2009–10	Chicago	29	3	23.4	.483	.000	.644	6.3	1.1	**1.4**	1.7	8.8
2009–10	Charlotte	25	0	21.7	.442	.000	.729	6.1	.9	.9	1.5	10.1
2010–11	Charlotte	41	2	21.0	.471	.000	.787	5.5	.7	.7	1.6	10.2
2011–12	Charlotte	54	30	18.8	.367	.333	.759	3.7	.6	.7	1.1	5.6
2012–13	Charlotte	26	2	13.8	.353	**.375**	.839	2.3	.7	.5	.6	4.8
2014–15	Memphis	2	0	3.5	**1.000**	—	**1.000**	.0	.5	.0	.0	2.0
Career		402	129	19.7	.438	.235	.732	4.8	.9	.8	1.3	7.7

=== Playoffs ===
Year	Team	GP	GS	MPG	FG%	3P%	FT%	RPG	APG	SPG	BPG	PPG
2007	Chicago	**10**	0	12.2	.390	—	.633	3.4	.6	**1.0**	.5	5.1
2009	Chicago	7	**7**	**27.9**	.438	.000	.786	**6.3**	**.9**	**1.0**	**2.9**	**9.6**
2010	Charlotte	4	0	17.0	**.625**	—	**.833**	5.5	.5	.5	.5	8.8
Career		21	7	18.3	.457	.000	.700	4.8	.7	.9	1.3	7.3

== Personal life ==
Thomas is known for his extensive tattoo work. He was introduced to tattoos by his mother who brought him to a tattoo artist when he was in tenth grade.
