= List of reportedly haunted locations in the United Kingdom =

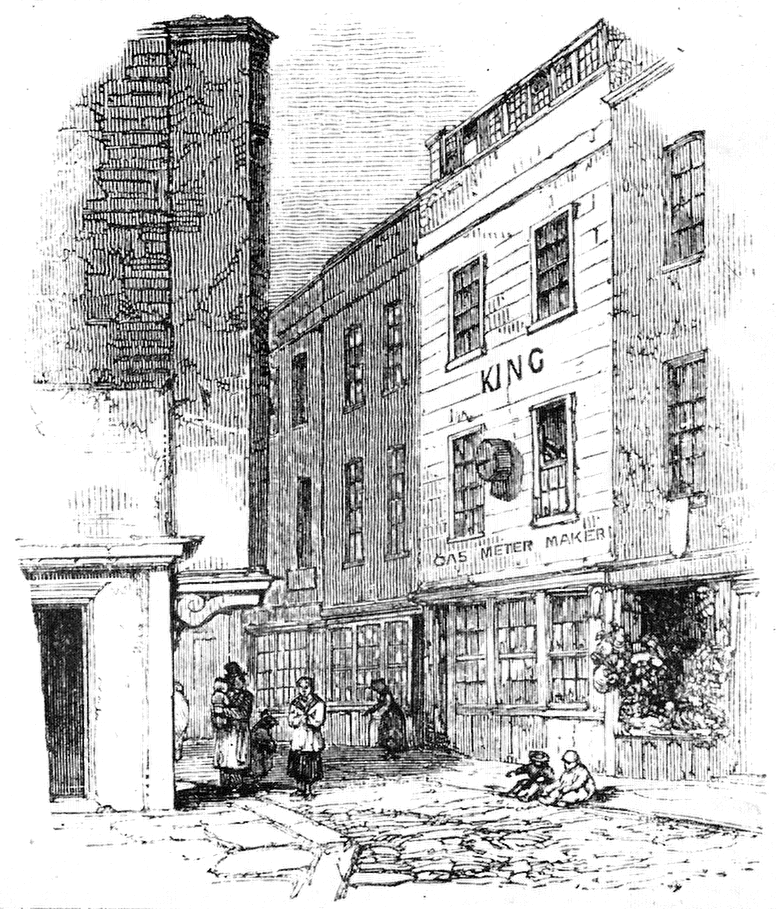
A 19th-century illustration of Cock Lane. The haunting took place in the three-storey building on the right.

The following is a list of reportedly haunted locations in the United Kingdom.

Great Britain is reputedly the most haunted landmass in the world, with England being the most haunted country, reporting the densest coverage of purported ghost sightings and paranormal experiences both per person and by geographical area. Scotland, Wales, and Northern Ireland are also rich in ghost lore, albeit less densely populated, and there is not a single village, town, or city without reports of ghosts and a belief in ghosts dating back multiple centuries.

== England ==
=== Bedfordshire ===
- Flitwick Manor, reputedly haunted and appeared on Strange but True? in 1995.

=== Berkshire ===
- Ostrich Inn, Colnbrook

=== Buckinghamshire ===
- Hellfire Caves

=== Cornwall ===
- Bodmin Jail in the town of Bodmin, Cornwall is a disused prison turned into a hotel and visitor attraction, the building supposedly houses a number of ghosts.
- Jamaica Inn
- The Wellington Hotel

=== Cumbria ===
- Moresby Hall

=== Derbyshire ===
- Derby Gaol
- Gresley Old Hall, Swadlincote
- Old Grammar School, Derby
- The George Inn
- The Old Bell Hotel, Derby

=== Dorset ===
- Athelhampton Hall

=== Essex ===
- Borley Rector in the village of Borley. No longer extant.
- Colchester is a haunted city, as seen on TV "Great British Ghosts"
- Epping Forest as seen on Most Haunted Live!#2003
- Kelvedon Hatch Secret Nuclear Bunker, Brentwood, Essex, is an old farmhouse with an ex nuclear bunker underneath the house, said to be very haunted, as seen on TV "Great British Ghosts"

=== Gloucestershire ===
- Ancient Ram Inn, in Gloucestershire. It has been featured on various paranormal television programmes.
- Chavenage House
- The New Inn, Gloucester
- Prestbury Village, Gloucestershire: the whole village is said to be haunted.
- Woodchester Mansion

=== Greater Manchester ===
- Owd Betts pub near Norden in Rochdale, Greater Manchester, supposedly houses the ghost of former landlady Betty Ashworth.

=== Hampshire ===
- Glasshayes House, a country house and former hotel redesigned by Arthur Conan Doyle in Lyndhurst
- Rufus Stone, a stone that marks the traditional site of the killing of William Rufus, outside Minstead

=== Kent ===
- Chatham Historic Dockyard

=== Lancashire ===
- Clitheroe Castle

=== Leicestershire ===
- Belgrave Hall, in Leicester, attracted attention in 1999 when a white figure was captured on CCTV. One theory is it is the daughter of a former owner.

=== Lincolnshire ===
- Bradley Woods, a forest near the village of Bradley, is haunted by the Black Lady of Bradley Woods
- RAF East Kirkby, a former airfield near the village of East Kirkby.
- RAF Elsham Wolds, a former airfield near the village of Elsham.
- RAF Metheringham, a former airfield near the village of Metheringham.

=== London ===
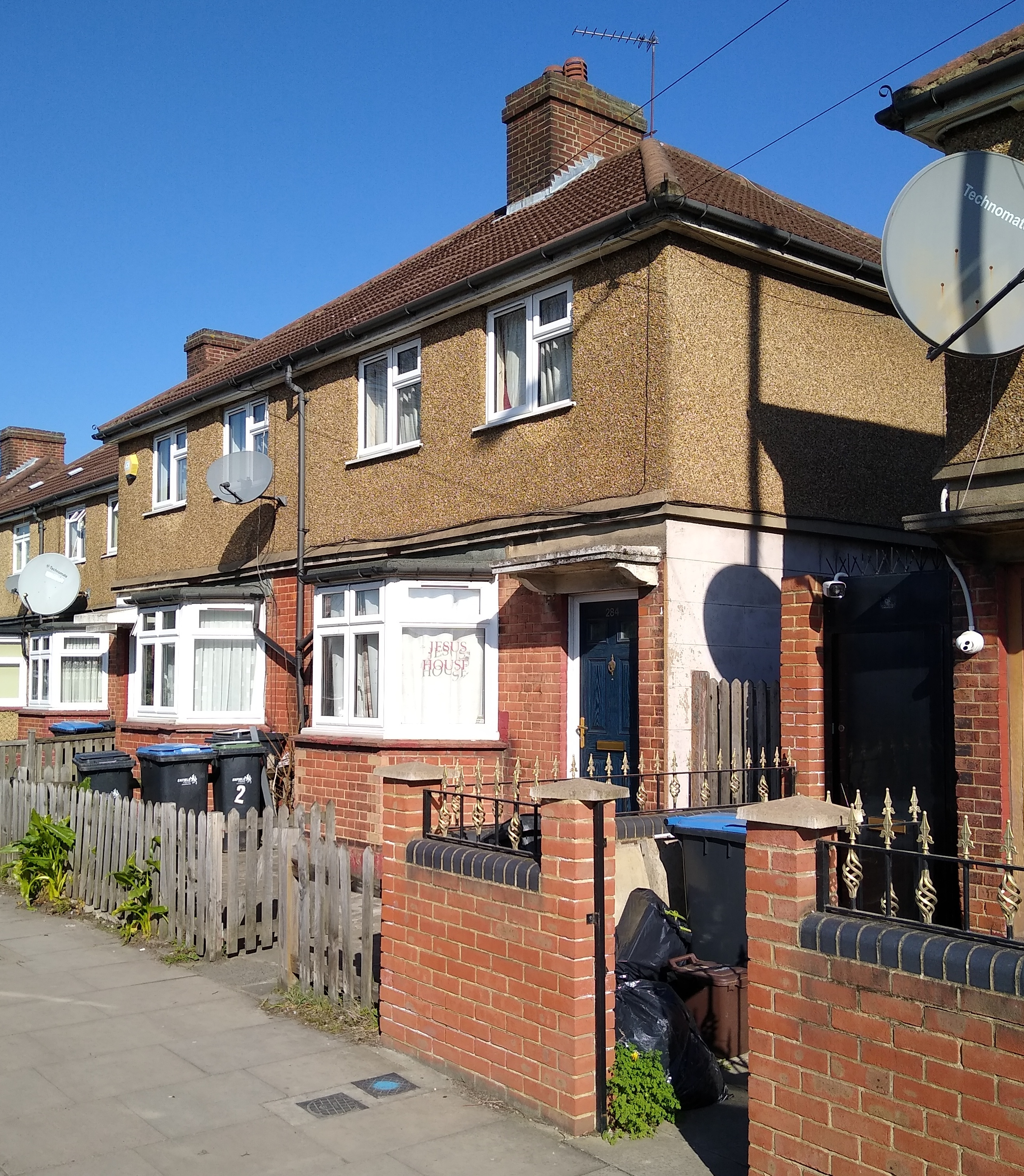
284 Green Street, Enfield

- Aldwych tube station
- 50 Berkeley Square, a townhouse in the City of Westminster.
- The British Museum
- Bruce Castle, a manor house in the borough of Haringey.
- 284 Green Street, a council house in the borough of Enfield.
- Cock Lane, a street in the City of London.
- Hall Place, in the London Borough of Bexley.
- Hampton Court Palace, a royal palace in the borough of Richmond upon Thames.
- Tower of London, a castle in the borough of Tower Hamlets.
- The Grenadier, Belgravia
- Theatre Royal, Drury Lane, a theatre haunted by the "Man in Grey".
- Viaduct Tavern, Holborn
- Caesar's Nightclub

=== Norfolk ===
- Muckleburgh Collection
- RAF Bircham Newton, a former airfield near the village of Docking.
- Raynham Hall, a country house near the village of East Raynham, it is haunted by the Brown Lady of Raynham Hall

=== Northumberland ===
- Chillingham Castle, a medieval castle in Chillingham. Northumberland
- Schooner Hotel

=== Nottinghamshire ===
- Galleries of Justice Museum and, historically, the Shire Hall and County Gaol the museum is housed in a former Victorian courtroom, prison, and police station and is therefore a historic site where an individual could be arrested, tried, sentenced and executed. The courtrooms date back to the 14th century and the gaol to at least 1449, and also said to be haunted

=== Somerset ===
- George Hotel and Pilgrims' Inn, Glastonbury

=== Staffordshire ===
- Tamworth Castle
- Tutbury Castle

=== Tyne and Wear ===
- Souter Lighthouse

=== Warwickshire ===
- Edge Hill, Warwickshire, a hamlet in southern Warwickshire.
- Guy's Cliffe, a manor house in the eponymous hamlet.

=== West Midlands ===
- The Station Hotel

=== Wiltshire ===
- Avebury Henge
- Black Swan Hotel, Devizes
- Devizes the whole village is said to be haunted.

== Northern Ireland ==
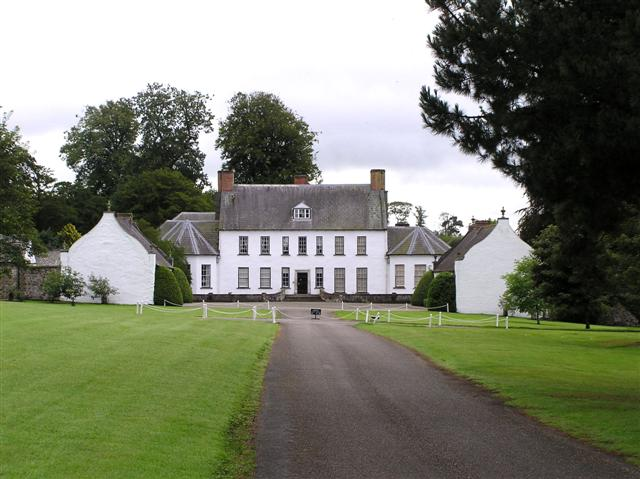
Springhill, Moneymore, County Londonderry

- Ballygally Castle, a castle in County Antrim.
- Springhill – the 17th-century Plantation House, home for nearly 300 years of the Lenox-Conyngham family.

== Scotland ==
- A fifteen-mile stretch of the A75 road, between Annan and Dumfries, is reported to be haunted.
- Abergeldie Castle is haunted by the Abergeldie Castle Ghost
- Ackergill Tower, Caithness
- Airth Castle Haunted by the Airth Castle Ghostlore
- Ardrossan Castle is said to be haunted by the ghost of William Wallace.
- Auchentiber Haunted by The Ghost of Auchentiber
- Balgonie Castle Haunted Ghostlore
- Ballechin House Haunted Ghostlore
- Bedlay Castle, Lanarkshire Haunted Ghostlore
- Brims Castle Haunted Ghostlore
- Cortachy Castle The castle is said to be haunted by the spirit of a drummer Drummer of Cortachy
- Craigcrook Castle, Midlothian
- Culzean Castle Haunted by Culzean Castle Ghosts
- Dornoch Castle
- Dunstaffnage Castle, Argyll & Bute Haunted by Dunstaffnage Castle Ghost's
- Duntrune Castle, Argyll & Bute
- Edinample Castle, Stirling
- Edinburgh Castle
- Edinburgh Festival Theatre is said by believers to be haunted by a tall, dark stranger rumoured to be the famous illusionist Sigmund Neuberger, a.k.a. The Great Lafayette.
- Edinburgh Playhouse
- The Edinburgh Vaults The television series Most Haunted and Ghost Adventures both aired an episode about the vaults.
- Ethie Castle, Angus
- Fyvie Castle
- Garleton Castle
- Glamis Castle
- Castle Grant
- Hermitage Castle
- Hill House
- HM Prison Castle Huntly
- Holyrood Palace is said to be haunted by Bald Agnes, the ghost of Agnes Sampson.
- Huntingtower Castle
- Kinnaird Wine Tower
- Kinneil House
- Knock Castle (Isle of Skye)
- Lauriston Castle
- Leith Hall
- Lennox Tower
- Linlithgow Palace
- Lochleven Castle
- Luibeilt Lodge
- Macduff's Castle
- Mary King's Close, an underground close in the Old Town area of Edinburgh.
- Meggernie Castle
- Neidpath Castle
- Pinkie House
- Queensberry House
- RAF Montrose, now Montrose Air Station Heritage Centre, is said to be haunted by the ghost of Desmond Arthur.
- Royal Lyceum Theatre
- Saltoun Hall
- Stirling Castle
- The Scotsman Hotel
- The Tolbooth is claimed by believers to be one of the most haunted buildings in Aberdeen and has been subject to many investigations by paranormal investigation teams.
- The Witchery by the Castle, a restaurant near Edinburgh Castle

== Wales ==
- Aberglasney House

- In Llanfihangel Crucorney, The Skirrid Mountain Inn, one of the oldest public houses in Wales, is reputed to be home to several ghosts.

- Llancaiach Fawr Mannor is a Tudor manor house near Nelson in the Caerphilly County Borough, South Wales. In 2007, the The Guardian listed Llancaiach as one of the top ten haunted places in the United Kingdom.

- Plas Teg is a Jacobean era house located near the village of Pontblyddyn between Wrexham and Mold, Flintshire. The house has featured on Living (channel) Most Haunted programme on two occasions. The second occasion was featured as part of the Halloween Most Haunted Live! series on 31 October 2007. It was also featured in Ghost Hunting With... Girls Aloud in 2006, where the girls visited the house as their first location, where they claimed to have experienced paranormal activity.

== See also ==
- List of ghosts
- List of Most Haunted episodes
- List of reportedly haunted locations in the world
- Reportedly haunted locations in Canada
- Reportedly haunted locations in the United States
