= List of Most Haunted episodes =

Most Haunted is a British television programme based on investigating purported paranormal activity produced by Antix Productions and was for satellite and cable channels Sky Living/LivingTV. Series 16 and onwards have been aired on the Freeview channel Really. The beginning of series 16 was shown online before other episodes for the series were broadcast on television. The following is a list of episodes and locations for the series since it began in 2002.

During its broadcast on LivingTV, Most Haunted: Midsummer Murders was not counted towards the then-existing series count. LivingTV then labelled the 2008 as Series 10 until their final series which they regarded as Series 14. This is reflected in DVD and syndicated streaming releases of those series. Producer and Director Karl Beattie clarified in a Tweet that he considers Midsummer Murders a Most Haunted series and the first series broadcast by Really as Series 16. In the Tweet he refers to the upcoming 2017 series as Series 21. For clarity this list reflects this numbering system. Most Haunted Live! and Most Haunted Extra episodes are not included in this list.

== Series overview ==
=== Original series ===
Series	Episodes	Originally released		Main medium(s)	Guest medium(s)	Parapsychologist(s)	DVD release
Series	Episodes	First released	Last released	Main medium(s)	Guest medium(s)	Parapsychologist(s)	DVD release
1	17	25 May 2002	17 September 2002	Derek Acorah	N/A	Jason Karl, David Scanlen, Vicki Purewal	Yes
2	11	8 April 2003	23 August 2003	Derek Acorah	N/A	Phil Whyman, Dr. Matthew Smith, Dr. Ciarán O'Keeffe	Yes
3	10	7 October 2003	9 December 2003	Derek Acorah	N/A	Dr. Matthew Smith, Dr. Ciarán O'Keeffe	Yes
4	12	23 March 2004	8 June 2004	Derek Acorah	Ian Lawman, Brian Shepherd, Judith Cooney, Derek Ogilvie, David Wells	Dr. Matthew Smith, Dr. Ciarán O'Keeffe	Yes
5	14	14 September 2004	29 January 2005	Derek Acorah	Brian Shepherd, David Wells, Ian Lawman	Dr. Ciarán O'Keeffe	Yes
6	29	22 March 2005	11 October 2005	Derek Acorah, David Wells	N/A	Dr. Ciarán O'Keeffe, Louie Savva	Yes
7	6	1 November 2005	6 December 2005	David Wells; Gordon Smith	N/A	Dr. Ciarán O'Keeffe, Louie Savva, Dr. Matthew Smith	Yes
8	15	27 June 2006	26 December 2006	David Wells	Ian Shillito, Ian Lawman, Kevin Wade, Gordon Smith	Dr. Ciarán O'Keeffe, Steve Parsons (Para. Science)	Yes
9	15	2 January 2007	10 April 2007	David Wells	Johnnie Fiori	Dr. Ciarán O'Keeffe	Yes
10	8	19 June 2007	7 August 2007	Brian Shepherd	N/A	Dr. Ciarán O'Keeffe	No
11	11	19 January 2008	29 April 2008	Brian Shepherd	Johnnie Fiori, Barrie John	Dr. Ciarán O'Keeffe	Yes
12	9	*4 November 2008	24 February 2009	Brian Shepherd	N/A	Dr. Ciarán O'Keeffe	Yes
13	8	*11 November 2008	3 March 2009	Brian Shepherd	N/A	Dr. Ciarán O'Keeffe	Yes
14	10	13 October 2009	15 December 2009	N/A	Billy Roberts, Chris Conway, Patrick Matthews	Dr. Ciarán O'Keeffe	Yes
15	10	12 May 2010	21 July 2010	Chris Conway	N/A	Dr. Ciarán O'Keeffe	Yes

- When Series 12 aired, it was mixed in with an 8-part mini-series entitled Most Haunted USA. The 8 episodes in the mini-series later became known as Series 13. The DVD for series 12 only contained the episodes from the USA.

=== Revived series ===
Following a change in the format of Most Haunted before Series 16 began filming, it was decided by the production team to no longer have mediums in the show. As a result, each series produces 10 episodes.

Series	Episodes	Originally released		Parapsychologist/Skeptic	DVD release
Series	Episodes	First released	Last released	Parapsychologist/Skeptic	DVD release
16	10	21 August 2014	23 October 2014	Dr. John Callow	No
17	10	4 June 2015	6 August 2014	Glen Hunt	No
18	10	18 October 2015	20 December 2014	Glen Hunt	No
19	10	30 June 2016	1 September 2016	Glen Hunt	No
20	10	14 April 2017	16 June 2017	Glen Hunt	No
21	10	27 October 2017	24 November 2017	Glen Hunt	No
22	10	19 January 2018	23 March 2018	Glen Hunt	No
23	10	19 October 2018	28 October 2018	Glen Hunt	No
24	10	11 January 2019	15 March 2019	Glen Hunt	No

=== YouTube Channel ===
Series	Episodes	Originally released		Parapsychologist/Skeptic	DVD release
Series	Episodes	First released	Last released	Parapsychologist/Skeptic	DVD release
Shorts / Extra	54	26 May 2019	4 January 2024	Glen Hunt	No

== Series 1 (2002) ==
No. overall	No. in series	Investigation of	Location	Directed by	Medium	Parapsychologist / Psychologist	Original release date	UK viewers (millions)	Presented By
0	Pilot	"Michelham Priory"	(England) Arlington, East Sussex	Bev Parr	Derek Acorah	Jason Karl	10 April 2002	0.15	Yvette Fielding
This is the team's first ever investigation which they originally filmed as a pilot and then presented as the Pilot episode. They would go on to investigate the location again for the 100th episode.
1	1	"Athelhampton Hall"	(England) Dorchester, Dorset	Bev Parr	Derek Acorah	Jason Karl	25 May 2002	0.277	Yvette Fielding
2	2	"Chillingham Castle"	(England) Chillingham, Northumberland	Bev Parr	Derek Acorah	Jason Karl	4 June 2002	0.276	Yvette Fielding
3	3	"The Ostrich Inn"	(England) Colnbrook, Berkshire	Bev Parr	Derek Acorah	Jason Karl	11 June 2002	0.169	Yvette Fielding
4	4	"Souter Lighthouse"	(England) Newcastle upon Tyne, Tyne and Wear	Karl Beattie	Derek Acorah	Jason Karl	18 June 2002	0.26	Yvette Fielding
5	5	"Avebury Stones & The Red Lion Pub"	(England) Avebury, Wiltshire	Karl Beattie	Derek Acorah	Jason Karl	25 June 2002	0.235	Yvette Fielding
6	6	"Culzean Castle"	(Scotland) Maybole, Ayrshire	Bev Parr	Derek Acorah	Jason Karl	2 July 2002	0.284	Yvette Fielding
7	7	"Derby Gaol"	(England) Derby, Derbyshire	Bev Parr	Derek Acorah	Jason Karl	9 July 2002	0.21	Yvette Fielding
8	8	"Aldwych Underground Station"	(England) Central London, London	Bev Parr	Derek Acorah	Jason Karl	16 July 2002	0.261	Yvette Fielding
9	9	"Treasure Holt"	(England) Essex	Bev Parr	Derek Acorah	Jason Karl	23 July 2002	0.257	Yvette Fielding
10	10	"Theatre Royal, Drury Lane"	(England) Central London, London	Bev Parr	Derek Acorah	Jason Karl	30 July 2002	0.282	Yvette Fielding
11	11	"Leap Castle"	(Republic of Ireland) Roscrea, County Offaly	Bev Parr	Derek Acorah	Jason Karl	6 August 2002	0.25	Yvette Fielding
12	12	"Charnock Hall"	(England) Preston, Lancashire	Bev Parr	Derek Acorah	Jason Karl	13 August 2002	0.181	Yvette Fielding
13	13	"The Mermaid Inn"	(England) Rye, Sussex, East Sussex	Bev Parr	Derek Acorah	Jason Karl	20 August 2002	0.468	Yvette Fielding
14	14	"Blackpool Pleasure Beach"	(England) Blackpool, Lancashire	Bev Parr	Derek Acorah	Jason Karl	27 August 2002	0.18	Yvette Fielding
15	15	"Charleville Castle"	(Republic of Ireland) Tullamore, County Offaly	Bev Parr	Derek Acorah	Jason Karl	3 September 2002	0.143	Yvette Fielding
16	16	"Levens Hall"	(England) Levens, Cumbria	Peter Roos	Derek Acorah	Jason Karl, David Scanlan, Vicki Purewal	17 September 2002	0.18	Yvette Fielding

== Series 2 (2003) ==
No. overall	No. in series	Investigation of	Location	Directed by	Medium	Paranormal Investigator	Parapsychologist / Psychologist	Original release date	UK viewers (millions)	Presented By
18	1	"The Skirrid Inn"	(Wales) Llanvihangel Crucorney, Monmouthshire	Karl Beattie	Derek Acorah	Phil Whyman	Dr. Matthew Smith	8 April 2003	0.36	Yvette Fielding
19	2	"Tutbury Castle"	(England) Tutbury, East Staffordshire	Karl Beattie	Derek Acorah	Phil Whyman	Dr. Matthew Smith	15 April 2003	0.42	Yvette Fielding
20	3	"The Station Hotel"	(England) Dudley, West Midlands	Karl Beattie	Derek Acorah	Phil Whyman	Ciarán O'Keeffe	22 April 2003	0.3	Yvette Fielding
21	4	"Llancaiach Fawr Manor"	Nelson, Caerphilly, South Wales	Karl Beattie	Derek Acorah	Phil Whyman	Dr. Matthew Smith	29 April 2003	0.4	Yvette Fielding
22	5	"Clerkenwell House of Detention"	(England) Clerkenwell, Central London	Karl Beattie	Derek Acorah	Phil Whyman	Ciarán O'Keeffe	6 May 2003	0.47	Yvette Fielding
23	6	"Three Locations - The Heritage Centre, Lafferty's Pub, The Bell Inn, Derby"	(England) Derby, Derbyshire	Karl Beattie	Derek Acorah	Phil Whyman	Dr. Matthew Smith	13 May 2003	0.5	Yvette Fielding
24	7	"Brannigans Nightclub"	(England) Manchester	Karl Beattie	Derek Acorah	Phil Whyman	Dr. Matthew Smith	20 May 2003	0.5	Yvette Fielding
25	8	"Pengersick Castle"	(England) Germoe, Cornwall	Karl Beattie	Derek Acorah	Phil Whyman	Ciarán O'Keeffe	27 May 2003	0.512	Yvette Fielding
26	9	"The Clock House"	(England) Surrey Hills, Surrey	Karl Beattie	Derek Acorah	Phil Whyman	Ciarán O'Keeffe	3 June 2003	0.4	Yvette Fielding
27	10	"Caesar's Nightclub"	(England) Streatham, London	Karl Beattie	Derek Acorah	Phil Whyman	Ciarán O'Keeffe	10 June 2003	0.49	Yvette Fielding

== Celebrity Special (2003) ==
No. overall	No. in series	Investigation of	Location	Directed by	Medium	Paranormal Investigator	Parapsychologist / Psychologist	Original release date	UK viewers (millions)	Presented By
28	S	"Belgrave Hall"	(England) Leicester, Leicestershire	Karl Beattie	Derek Acorah	Phil Whyman	Dr. Matthew Smith	23 August 2003	0.24	Yvette Fielding
Guest starring Vic Reeves and Nancy Sorrell

== Series 3 (2003) ==
No. overall	No. in series	Investigation of	Location	Directed by	Medium	Paranormal Investigator	Parapsychologist / Psychologist	Original release date	UK viewers (millions)	Presented By
29	1	"RAF East Kirkby"	(England) East Kirkby, Lincolnshire	Karl Beattie	Derek Acorah	Phil Whyman	Ciarán O'Keeffe	7 October 2003	0.37	Yvette Fielding
"Dedicated to all service" people "who fought... during WWII"
30	2	"Moresby Hall"	(England) Whitehaven, Cumbria	Karl Beattie	Derek Acorah	Phil Whyman	Dr. Matthew Smith	14 October 2003	0.28	Yvette Fielding
31	3	"Edinburgh Vaults"	(Scotland) Edinburgh	Karl Beattie	Derek Acorah	Phil Whyman	Dr. Matthew Smith	21 October 2003	0.34	Yvette Fielding
32	4	"Leith Hall"	(Scotland) Kennethmont, Aberdeenshire	Karl Beattie	Derek Acorah	Phil Whyman	Dr. Matthew Smith	28 October 2003	0.29	Yvette Fielding
33	5	"Aberglasney House"	(Wales) Llangathen, Carmarthenshire	Karl Beattie	Derek Acorah	Phil Whyman	Dr. Matthew Smith	4 November 2003	0.3	Yvette Fielding
34	6	"Tamworth Castle"	(England) Tamworth, Staffordshire	Karl Beattie	Derek Acorah	Phil Whyman	Dr. Matthew Smith	11 November 2003	0.37	Yvette Fielding
35	7	"Fitz Manor"	(England) Fitz, Shropshire	Karl Beattie	Derek Acorah	Phil Whyman	Dr. Matthew Smith	18 November 2003	0.402	Yvette Fielding
36	8	"The Schooner Hotel"	(England) Alnmouth, Northumberland	Karl Beattie	Derek Acorah	Phil Whyman	Dr. Matthew Smith	25 November 2003	0.38	Yvette Fielding
37	9	"The Muckleburgh Collection"	(England) Weybourne, Norfolk, North Norfolk	Karl Beattie	Derek Acorah	Phil Whyman	Dr. Matthew Smith	2 December 2003	0.38	Yvette Fielding
38	10	"The Galleries of Justice"	(England) Nottingham, Nottinghamshire	Karl Beattie	Derek Acorah	Phil Whyman	Dr. Matthew Smith	9 December 2003	0.52	Yvette Fielding

== Series 4 (2004) ==
No. overall	No. in series	Investigation of	Location	Directed by	Medium / Psychic	Paranormal Investigator	Parapsychologist / Psychologist	Original release date	UK viewers (millions)	Presented By
39	1	"Owlpen Manor"	(England) Owlpen, Gloucestershire	Karl Beattie	Derek Acorah, Ian Lawman	Phil Whyman	Dr. Matthew Smith	23 March 2004	0.49	Yvette Fielding
"First episode to be followed by a 'Most Haunted Extra' companion show."
40	2	"Craig-y-Nos Castle"	(Wales) Glyntawe, Powys	Karl Beattie	Derek Acorah	Phil Whyman	Dr. Matthew Smith	30 March 2004	0.482	Yvette Fielding
41	3	"Jamaica Inn"	(England) Bodmin Moor, Cornwall	Karl Beattie	Derek Acorah, Ian Lawman	Phil Whyman	Dr. Matthew Smith	6 April 2004	0.37	Yvette Fielding
42	4	"Croxteth Hall"	(England) West Derby, Merseyside	Karl Beattie	Derek Acorah, Brian Shepherd	Phil Whyman	Dr. Matthew Smith	13 April 2004	0.43	Yvette Fielding
43	5	"Hellfire Caves"	(England) West Wycombe, Buckinghamshire	Karl Beattie	Derek Acorah	Phil Whyman	Dr. Matthew Smith	20 April 2004	0.5	Yvette Fielding
44	6	"The Manor House Hotel"	(England) Ferryhill, County Durham, Northumberland	Karl Beattie	Derek Acorah, Ian Lawman	Phil Whyman	Ciaran O'Keefe	27 April 2004	0.39	Yvette Fielding
45	7	"Mary King's Close"	(Scotland) Edinburgh City Chambers, Edinburgh	Karl Beattie	Derek Acorah, Derek Ogilvie	Phil Whyman	Ciaran O'Keefe	4 May 2004	0.49	Yvette Fielding
46	8	"The Wellington Hote"	(England) Boscastle, Forrabury and Minster, Cornwall	Karl Beattie	Derek Acorah, Ian Lawman	Phil Whyman	Dr. Matthew Smith	11 May 2004	0.45	Yvette Fielding
47	9	"Chatham Historic Dockyard"	(England) Chatham, Kent, Kent	Karl Beattie	Derek Acorah, Brian Shepherd	Phil Whyman	Dr. Matthew Smith	18 May 2004	0.28	Yvette Fielding
"Last episode in this series to be accompanied by a 'Most Haunted Extra' companion show."
48	10	"Leicester Guildhall"	(England) Leicester, Leicestershire	Karl Beattie	Derek Acorah, David Wells	Phil Whyman	Dr. Matthew Smith	25 May 2004	0.29	Yvette Fielding
49	11	"Greengate Brewery"	(England) Middleton, Greater Manchester	Karl Beattie	Derek Acorah, David Wells	Phil Whyman	Dr. Matthew Smith	1 June 2004	0.43	Yvette Fielding
50	12	"Bromwich Hall - The Manor House Museum"	(England) West Bromwich, West Midlands	Karl Beattie	Derek Acorah, David Wells	Phil Whyman	Ciarán O'Keeffe	8 June 2004	0.43	Yvette Fielding

== Series 5 (2004/2005) ==
No. overall	No. in series	Investigation of	Location	Directed by	Medium	Psychic	Parapsychologist / Psychologist	Original release date	UK viewers (millions)	Presented By
51	1	"Chough's Hotel"	(England) Chard, Somerset	Karl Beattie	Derek Acorah	Ian Lawman	Dr. Matthew Smith	14 September 2004	0.51	Yvette Fielding
"Guest starring politician & Most Haunted Live! Presenter David Bull. Most Haunted Extra was reinstated with this episode."
52	2	"The Old Hall Hotel"	(England) Sandbach, Cheshire	Karl Beattie	Derek Acorah	David Wells	Ciaran O'Keefe	21 September 2004	0.48	Yvette Fielding
"Guest starring TV presenter Gaby Roslin"
53	3	"Black Swan Inn"	(England) Devizes, Wiltshire	Karl Beattie	Derek Acorah	Brian Shepherd	Ciaran O'Keefe	28 September 2004	0.376	Yvette Fielding
"Guest starring illusionist Uri Gellar"
54	4	"Kinnitty Castle"	(Republic of Ireland) Kinnitty, County Offaly	Karl Beattie	Derek Acorah	N/A	Ciaran O'Keefe	5 October 2004	0.29	Yvette Fielding
55	5	"Castle Leslie"	(Republic of Ireland) Glaslough, County Monaghan	Karl Beattie	Derek Acorah	N/A	Ciaran O'Keefe	12 October 2004	N/A	Yvette Fielding
56	6	"Doorwerth Castle"	(Netherlands) Arnhem, Gelderland	Karl Beattie	Derek Acorah	N/A	Ciaran O'Keefe	19 October 2004	0.29	Yvette Fielding
57	7	"Ammersoyen Castle"	(Netherlands) Ammerzoden, Gelderland	Karl Beattie	Derek Acorah	N/A	Ciaran O'Keefe	26 October 2004	N/A	Yvette Fielding
58	8	"Ordsall Hall"	(England) Salford, Greater Manchester	Karl Beattie	Derek Acorah	Ian Lawman	Ciaran O'Keefe	2 November 2004	0.31	Yvette Fielding
59	9	"Samlesbury Hall"	(England) Samlesbury, Lancashire	Karl Beattie	Derek Acorah	David Wells	Ciaran O'Keefe	9 November 2004	N/A	Yvette Fielding
60	10	"Oldham Coliseum Theatre"	(England) Oldham, Greater Manchester	Karl Beattie	Derek Acorah	Ian Lawman	Ciaran O'Keefe	16 November 2004	0.477	Yvette Fielding
61	11	"Ancient Ram Inn"	(England) Wotton-under-Edge, Gloucestershire	Karl Beattie	Derek Acorah	Brian Shepherd	Ciaran O'Keefe	23 November 2004	0.352	Yvette Fielding
62	12	"Pleasley Vale Mills"	(England) Mansfield, Nottinghamshire	Karl Beattie	Derek Acorah	David Wells	Ciaran O'Keefe	30 November 2004	0.35	Yvette Fielding
63	13	"Bodelwyddan Castle"	(Wales) Bodelwyddan, Denbighshire	Karl Beattie	Derek Acorah	David Wells	Ciaran O'Keefe	7 December 2004	0.46	Yvette Fielding
64	14	"Annesley Hall"	(England) Annesley, Nottinghamshire	Karl Beattie	Derek Acorah	David Wells	Ciaran O'Keefe	29 January 2005	0.25	Yvette Fielding

== Series 6 (2005) ==
No. overall	No. in series	Investigation of	Location	Directed by	Medium	Psychic	Parapsychologist / Psychologist	Original release date	UK viewers (millions)	Presented By
65	1	"The Ghost House"	(England) Privert Location, Nottinghamshire	Karl Beattie	Derek Acorah; David Wells	N/A	Ciarán O'Keeffe	22 March 2005	N/A	Yvette Fielding
66	2	"Bodmin Jail"	(England) Bodmin Moor, Cornwall	Karl Beattie	Derek Acorah; David Wells	N/A	Ciarán O'Keeffe	29 March 2005	0.433	Yvette Fielding
After it was broadcast this episode became controversial. Ciarán O'Keeffe later gave an interview to the press that Derek mentioning or being possessed by spirits Kreed Kafer and Rik Eedles was proof of his suspicions that he was faking the investigations. O'Keefe alleged he'd fabricated the names (from anagrams of 'Derek Faker' and 'Derek Lies') and asked crew members to intentionally mention them to Derek during the investigation. During the episode O'Keeffe simply reports that there was no record of anyone with the name Kreed Kafer connected with the gaol.
67	3	"Dalston Hall"	(England) Dalston, Cumbria, Cumbria, Cumberland	Karl Beattie	Derek Acorah; David Wells	N/A	Ciarán O'Keeffe	5 April 2005	0.324	Yvette Fielding
68	4	"Somerleyton Hall"	(England) Somerleyton, Suffolk	Karl Beattie	Derek Acorah; David Wells	N/A	Ciarán O'Keeffe	12 April 2005	0.411	Yvette Fielding
69	5	"Golden Fleece Inn, York"	(England) Pavement (York), York, North Yorkshire	Karl Beattie	Derek Acorah; David Wells	N/A	Ciarán O'Keeffe	19 April 2005	0.508	Yvette Fielding
Featuring a celebrity guest team of Scott Mills, Mark Chapman, Laura Sayers and Neil Sloan from BBC Radio 1's afternoon show.
70	6	"Lower Well Head Farm"	(England) Newchurch in Pendle, Pendle Hill, Lancashire	Karl Beattie	Derek Acorah; David Wells	N/A	Ciarán O'Keeffe	26 April 2005	0.409	Yvette Fielding
71	7	"Tynedale Farm"	(England) Newchurch in Pendle, Pendle Hill, Lancashire	Karl Beattie	Derek Acorah; David Wells	N/A	Ciarán O'Keeffe	3 May 2005	0.280	Yvette Fielding
72	8	"Prideaux Place"	(England) Padstow, Cornwall	Karl Beattie	Derek Acorah; David Wells	N/A	Ciarán O'Keeffe; Louie Savva	10 May 2005	0.352	Yvette Fielding
73	9	"The London Dungeon"	(England) Lambeth, Central London, London	Karl Beattie	Derek Acorah; David Wells	N/A	Dr. Ciarán O'Keeffe	17 May 2005	0.418	Yvette Fielding
Featuring guest Medium of Fred Batt
74	10	"Cotswold Manor House was Petty France"	Petty France, Gloucestershire, South Gloucestershire, South West England	Karl Beattie	Derek Acorah; David Wells	N/A	Dr. Ciarán O'Keeffe	24 May 2005	0.429	Yvette Fielding
75	11	"Arreton Manor"	(England) , (United Kingdom) Arreton, Isle of Wight	Karl Beattie	Derek Acorah; David Wells	N/A	Dr. Ciarán O'Keeffe & Louie Savva	31 May 2005	0.387	Yvette Fielding
76	12	"Appuldurcombe House"	(England) , (United Kingdom) Wroxall, Isle of Wight, Isle of Wight	Karl Beattie	Derek Acorah; David Wells	N/A	Dr. Ciarán O'Keeffe	7 June 2005	0.344	Yvette Fielding
77	13	"The Black Bull"	(England) Haworth, West Yorkshire	Karl Beattie	Derek Acorah; David Wells	N/A	Dr. Ciarán O'Keeffe	22 June 2005	0.341	Yvette Fielding
78	12	"Fyvie Castle"	(Scotland) , (United Kingdom) Fyvie, Turriff, Aberdeenshire	Karl Beattie	Derek Acorah; David Wells	N/A	Dr. Ciarán O'Keeffe; Louie Savva	28 June 2005	0.353	Yvette Fielding
79	13	"Craigievar Castle"	(Scotland) , (United Kingdom) Alford, Aberdeenshire	Karl Beattie	Derek Acorah; David Wells	N/A	Dr. Ciarán O'Keeffe	5 July 2005	0.321	Yvette Fielding
80	14	"Whaley House"	, (United States) San Diego, Southern California	Karl Beattie	Derek Acorah; David Wells	N/A	Dr. Ciarán O'Keeffe	12 July 2005	0.368	Yvette Fielding
81	15	"RMS Queen Mary (Part 1)"	(Long Beach, California) , (United States) Los Angeles County, California	Karl Beattie	Derek Acorah; David Wells	N/A	Dr. Ciarán O'Keeffe	19 July 2005	0.306	Yvette Fielding
82	16	"RMS Queen Mary (Part 2)"	(Long Beach, California) , (United States) Los Angeles County, California	Karl Beattie	Derek Acorah; David Wells	N/A	Dr. Ciarán O'Keeffe	21 July 2005	0.292	Yvette Fielding
83	17	"American Legion Post 43"	(California) , (United States) Hollywood, Los Angeles	Karl Beattie	Derek Acorah; David Wells	N/A	Dr. Ciarán O'Keeffe	25 July 2005	0.406	Yvette Fielding
Dedicated to the memory of Marshall Wyatt.
84	18	"Leonis Adobe"	(California) , (United States) Calabasas, Los Angeles	Karl Beattie	Derek Acorah; David Wells	N/A	Dr. Ciarán O'Keeffe	27 July 2005	0.340	Yvette Fielding
85	19	"Drum Barracks"	(California) , (United States) Wilmington, Los Angeles	Karl Beattie	Derek Acorah; David Wells	N/A	Dr. Ciarán O'Keeffe	2 August 2005	0.362	Yvette Fielding
85	20	"Bolling Hall"	(England) , (United Kingdom) Bradford, West Yorkshire	Karl Beattie	Derek Acorah; David Wells	N/A	Dr. Ciarán O'Keeffe	4 August 2005	0.369	Yvette Fielding
86	21	"Elvaston Castle"	(England) , (United Kingdom) Elvaston, Derbyshire	Karl Beattie	Derek Acorah; David Wells	N/A	Dr. Ciarán O'Keeffe	9 August 2005	0.372	Yvette Fielding
87	22	"Smithills Hall"	(England) , (United Kingdom) Smithills, Bolton, Greater Manchester	Karl Beattie	Derek Acorah; David Wells	N/A	Dr. Ciarán O'Keeffe	16 August 2005	0.499	Yvette Fielding
88	23	"Peterborough Museum and Art Gallery"	(England) , (United Kingdom) City of Peterborough, Peterborough, Cambridgeshire	Karl Beattie	Derek Acorah; David Wells	N/A	Dr. Ciarán O'Keeffe	23 August 2005	0.451	Yvette Fielding
89	24	"Tissington Hall"	(England) , (United Kingdom) Tissington, Ashbourne, Derbyshire Dales, Derbyshire	Karl Beattie	Derek Acorah; David Wells	N/A	Dr. Ciarán O'Keeffe	30 August 2005	0.467	Yvette Fielding
90	25	"Hellens Manor"	(England) , (United Kingdom) Much Marcle, Herefordshire	Karl Beattie	Derek Acorah; David Wells	N/A	Dr. Ciarán O'Keeffe	6 September 2005	N/A	Yvette Fielding
91	26	"Tretower Court"	(Wales) , (United Kingdom) Tretower, Cwmdu, Powys, Crickhowell, Powys	Karl Beattie	Derek Acorah; David Wells	N/A	Dr. Ciarán O'Keeffe; Louie Savva	13 September 2005	0.339	Yvette Fielding
Final appearance of Derek Acorah.
92	27	"Sinai Park House"	(England) , (United Kingdom) Shobnall, Burton upon Trent, East Staffordshire, Staffordshire	Karl Beattie	David Wells	N/A	Dr. Ciarán O'Keeffe	11 October 2005	0.34	Yvette Fielding

== Series 7 (2005) ==
No. overall	No. in series	Investigation of	Location	Directed by	Medium	Psychic	Parapsychologist / Psychologist	Original release date	UK viewers (millions)	Presented By
94	1	"Lower Southwood Cottage"	(England) , (United Kingdom) (Privert House), Exeter, Devon	Karl Beattie	Gordon Smith; David Wells	N/A	Dr. Ciarán O'Keeffe	1 November 2005	0.453	Yvette Fielding
95	2	"The Castle, Newcastle Keep"	(England) , (United Kingdom) Newcastle upon Tyne, Tyne and Wear	Karl Beattie	Gordon Smith; David Wells	N/A	Dr. Ciarán O'Keeffe; Louie Savva	8 November 2005	0.414	Yvette Fielding
96	3	"Woodchester Mansion"	(England) , (United Kingdom) Nympsfield, Gloucestershire	Karl Beattie	Gordon Smith; David Wells	N/A	Dr. Ciarán O'Keeffe	15 November 2005	0.381	Yvette Fielding
97	4	"Coronation Street set"	(England) , (United Kingdom) Granada Studios, Quay Street, Manchester city centre, Manchester	Karl Beattie	Gordon Smith; David Wells	N/A	Dr. Ciarán O'Keeffe	22 November 2005	0.406	Yvette Fielding
Featuring soap opera stars Simon Gregson and Sue Cleaver.
98	5	"The Olde Church House Inn"	(England) , (United Kingdom) Torbryan, Denbury and Torbryan, Teignbridge, Devon	Karl Beattie	Gordon Smith; David Wells	N/A	Dr. Ciarán O'Keeffe	29 November 2005	0.278	Yvette Fielding
99	6	"Mains Hall"	(England) , (United Kingdom) Singleton, Blackpool, Lancashire	Karl Beattie	David Wells; Gordon Smith	N/A	Dr. Ciarán O'Keeffe	6 December 2005	0.313	Yvette Fielding

== Series 8 (2006) ==
No. overall	No. in series	Investigation of	Location	Directed by	Medium	Paranormal Investigator	Parapsychologist / Psychologist	Original release date	UK viewers (millions)	Presented By
100	1	"100th Episode & Where it all began, as they Return to Michelham Priory"	(England) , (United Kingdom) Arlington, Wealden District, East Sussex	Karl Beattie	David Wells; Ian Shillito	N/A	Dr. Ciarán O'Keeffe	27 June 2006	0.26	Yvette Fielding
101	2	"Warwick Castle"	(England) , (United Kingdom) Warwick, Warwick District, Warwickshire	Karl Beattie	David Wells; Ian Lawman	N/A	Dr. Ciarán O'Keeffe	4 July 2006	Unknown	Yvette Fielding
102	3	"Gladstone Pottery Museum"	(England) , (United Kingdom) Longton, Stoke-on-Trent, North Staffordshire, Staffordshire	Karl Beattie	David Wells; Ian Lawman	Steve Parsons	N/A	11 July 2006	0.240	Yvette Fielding
103	4	"Plas Mawr"	, (United Kingdom) Conwy, Conwy County Borough, North Wales	Karl Beattie	David Wells; Ian Lawman	N/A	Dr. Ciarán O'Keeffe	18 July 2006	Unknown	Yvette Fielding
104	5	"Margam Castle"	(Wales) , (United Kingdom) Margam, Neath Port Talbot, Port Talbot	Karl Beattie	David Wells; Kevin Wade	Steve Parsons	N/A	24 July 2006	Unknown	Yvette Fielding
105	6	"Ancient High House"	(England) , (United Kingdom) Stafford, Staffordshire	Karl Beattie	David Wells; Ian Shillito	N/A	Dr. Ciarán O'Keeffe	1 August 2006	Unknown	Yvette Fielding
106	7	"Royal Exchange"	(England) , (United Kingdom) Manchester city centre, Manchester	Karl Beattie	David Wells; Ian Shillito	Steve Parsons	N/A	8 August 2006	0.205	Yvette Fielding
107	8	"Preston Manor"	(England) , (United Kingdom) Preston, Brighton and Hove, East Sussex	Karl Beattie	David Wells; Ian Shillito	N/A	Dr. Ciarán O'Keeffe	15 August 2006	Unknown	Yvette Fielding
108	9	"North East Land, Sea and Air Museums"	(England) , (United Kingdom) Washington, Tyne and Wear, Sunderland, Tyne and Wear	Karl Beattie	David Wells; Ian Shillito	Steve Parsons	N/A	22 August 2006	0.251	Yvette Fielding
109	10	"Taunton Castle"	(England) , (United Kingdom) Taunton, Somerset	Karl Beattie	David Wells; Ian Shillito	N/A	Dr. Ciarán O'Keeffe	29 August 2006	0.258	Yvette Fielding
110	11	"East Riddlesden Hall"	(England) , (United Kingdom) Keighley, West Yorkshire	Karl Beattie	David Wells; Ian Shillito	N/A	Dr. Ciarán O'Keeffe	5 September 2006	0.247	Yvette Fielding
111	12	"RRS Discovery & HM Frigate Unicorn"	(Scotland) , (United Kingdom) Dundee	Karl Beattie	David Wells; Ian Shillito	Steve Parsons	N/A	12 September 2006	0.213	Yvette Fielding
112	13	"Bamburgh Castle"	(England) , (United Kingdom) Bamburgh, Northumberland	Karl Beattie	David Wells; Gordon Smith	N/A	Dr. Matthew Smith	19 September 2006	0.254	Yvette Fielding
113	14	"Chambercombe Manor"	(England) , (United Kingdom) Ilfracombe, Devon	Karl Beattie	David Wells; Gordon Smith	N/A	Dr. Ciarán O'Keeffe	26 September 2006	0.231	Yvette Fielding
114	15	"Spitbank Fort"	(England) , (United Kingdom) Portsmouth, Hampshire	Karl Beattie	David Wells; Gordon Smith	N/A	Dr. Matthew Smith	26 December 2006	Unknown	Yvette Fielding

== Series 9 (2007) ==
No. overall	No. in series	Investigation of	Location	Directed by	Medium	Local / Guest Medium	Parapsychologist / Psychologist	Original release date	UK viewers (millions)
115	1	"South Stack Lighthouse"	(Wales) Anglesey	Karl Beattie	David Wells	Michelle Taylor	Dr. Ciarán O'Keeffe	2 January 2007	0.269
116	2	"Boys Hall"	(England) Willesborough, Ashford, Kent	Karl Beattie	David Wells	Rose Dixon	Dr. Ciarán O'Keeffe	9 January 2007	0.368
117	3	"Beaumaris Gaol"	(Wales) Beaumaris, Anglesey	Karl Beattie	David Wells	Michelle Taylor	Dr. Ciarán O'Keeffe	16 January 2007	0.365
118	4	"Brougham Hall"	(England) Penrith, Cumbria	Karl Beattie	David Wells	Martin Smith	Dr. Ciarán O'Keeffe	23 January 2007	0.211
119	5	"Alton Towers"	(England) Alton, Staffordshire	Karl Beattie	David Wells	N/A	Dr. Ciarán O'Keeffe	30 January 2007	0.261
120	6	"Dartford Library"	(England) Dartford, Kent	Karl Beattie	David Wells	Michelle Taylor	Dr. Ciarán O'Keeffe	6 February 2007	0.277
121	7	"Stockport Workhouse"	(England) Stockport, Greater Manchester	Karl Beattie	David Wells	Michelle Taylor	Dr. Ciarán O'Keeffe	13 February 2007	0.272
122	8	"Tatton Old Hall"	(England) Knutsford, Cheshire	Karl Beattie	David Wells	Joanne Gregory	Dr. Ciarán O'Keeffe	20 February 2007	0.318
Guest starring journalist Carol Thatcher
123	9	"Cammell Laird"	(England) Birkenhead, Merseyside	Karl Beattie	David Wells	N/A	Dr. Ciarán O'Keeffe	27 February 2007	Unknown
124	10	"Sutton House"	(England) Hackney, London	Karl Beattie	David Wells	N/A	Dr. Ciarán O'Keeffe	6 March 2007	Unknown
Guest starring singer Lee Ryan
125	11	"Tatton Park Mansion"	(England) Knutsford, Cheshire	Karl Beattie	David Wells	N/A	Dr. Ciarán O'Keeffe	13 March 2007	0.265
126	12	"Matlock Bath Pavilion"	(England) Matlock Bath, Derbyshire	Karl Beattie	David Wells	Joanne Gregory	Dr. Ciarán O'Keeffe	20 March 2007	0.244
127	13	"Hever Castle"	(England) Hever, Kent	Karl Beattie	David Wells	Johnnie Fiori	Dr. Ciarán O'Keeffe	27 March 2007	0.279
128	14	"Râșnov Citadel (Part 1)"	(Romania) Râşnov, Transylvania	Karl Beattie	David Wells	N/A	Dr. Ciarán O'Keeffe	4 April 2007	0.2
129	15	"Râșnov Citadel (Part 2)"	(Romania) Râşnov, Transylvania	Karl Beattie	David Wells	N/A	Dr. Ciarán O'Keeffe	10 April 2007	0.209

== Series 10 - Midsummer Murders (2007) ==
No. overall	No. in series	Investigation of	Location	Directed by	Medium	Historian	Parapsychologist	Original release date	UK viewers (millions)
130	1	"Stoney Middleton"	(England) Derbyshire Dales, Derbyshire	Karl Beattie	David Wells	Lesley Smith	Dr. Ciarán O'Keeffe	19 June 2007	0.207
131	2	"Nantwich"	(England) Cheshire	Karl Beattie	David Wells	Lesley Smith	Dr. Ciarán O'Keeffe	26 June 2007	0.199
132	3	"Castleton"	(England) Castleton, Derbyshire	Karl Beattie	David Wells	Lesley Smith	Dr. Ciarán O'Keeffe	3 July 2007	0.188
133	4	"Pluckley"	(England) Ashford, Kent	Karl Beattie	David Wells	Lesley Smith	Dr. Ciarán O'Keeffe	10 July 2007	Unknown
134	5	"Ruthin"	(Wales) Denbighshire	Karl Beattie	David Wells	Lesley Smith	Dr. Ciarán O'Keeffe	17 July 2007	0.171
135	6	"Tutbury"	(England) Staffordshire, West Midlands	Karl Beattie	David Wells	Lesley Smith	Dr. Ciarán O'Keeffe	24 July 2007	Unknown
136	7	"Tarvin"	(England) Cheshire West and Chester, Cheshire	Karl Beattie	David Wells	Lesley Smith	Dr. Ciarán O'Keeffe	31 July 2007	Unknown
137	8	"Bakewell"	(England) Derbyshire Dales, Derbyshire	Karl Beattie	David Wells	Lesley Smith	Dr. Ciarán O'Keeffe	7 August 2007	Unknown

== Series 11 (2008) ==
No. overall	No. in series	Investigation of	Location	Directed by	Medium	Historian	Parapsychologist	Original release date	UK viewers (millions)
138	1	"Coalhouse Fort (Night 1) recorded November 2007"	(England) Thurrock, Essex	Karl Beattie	Unknown	TBA	TBA	19 February 2008	0.228 +1: 0.110
139	2	"Coalhouse Fort (Night 2) recorded November 2007"	(England) Thurrock, Essex	Karl Beattie	Unknown	TBA	TBA	26 February 2008	0.186 +1: 0.096
140	3	"Morecambe Winter Gardens (Night 1) recorded December 2007"	(England) Morecambe, Lancashire	Karl Beattie	Unknown	TBA	TBA	4 March 2008	0.258 +1: 0.086
141	4	"Morecambe Winter Gardens (Night 2) recorded December 2007"	(England) Morecambe, Lancashire	Karl Beattie	Unknown	TBA	TBA	11 March 2008	0.260 +1: 0.140
142	5	"Oxford Castle Unlocked recorded December 2007"	(England) Oxford, Oxfordshire	Karl Beattie	Barrie John	Lesley Smith	Dr Ciarán O'Keeffe	18 March 2008	0.304 +1: 0.139
143	6	"Plas y Dduallt recorded December 2007"	(Wales) Snowdonia	Karl Beattie	Barrie John	Lesley Smith	Dr Ciarán O'Keeffe	25 March 2008	0.266 +1: 0.119
144	7	"Chislehurst Caves (Night 1) recorded January 2008"	(England) Chislehurst, Bromley	Karl Beattie	Barrie John	Lesley Smith	Dr Ciarán O'Keeffe	1 April 2008	0.344 +1: 0.128
145	8	"Chislehurst Caves (Night 2) recorded January 2008"	(England) Chislehurst, Bromley	Karl Beattie	Barrie John	Lesley Smith	Dr Ciarán O'Keeffe	8 April 2008	0.194 +1: 0.083
146	9	"Pembrey Woods recorded January 2008"	(Wales) Pembrey, Carmarthenshire	Karl Beattie	Unknown	TBA	TBA	15 April 2008	0.203 +1: 0.110
147	10	"Hack Green Nuclear Bunker recorded February 2008"	(England) Nantwich, Cheshire	Karl Beattie	Unknown	TBA	TBA	22 April 2008	0.222 +1: 0.122
148	11	"Plas Newydd recorded February 2008"	(Wales) Llangollen, Denbighshire	Karl Beattie	Unknown	TBA	TBA	29 April 2008	0.204 +1: 0.113

== Series 12 (2008–2009) ==
Series 12 was broadcast on alternate weeks alongside Most Haunted USA.

#	Original Airdate	Episode Title	Location	Nation
149	4 November 2008	Nunnington Hall	Nunnington, North Yorkshire	(England)
150	18 November 2008	Hall i' th' Wood	Bolton, Greater Manchester	(England)
151	2 December 2008	Exeter Old Courts	Exeter, Devonshire	(England)
152	16 December 2008	The Niddry Street Vaults	Edinburgh	(Scotland)
153	30 December 2008	Jedburgh Castle Jail	Jedburgh, Scottish Borders	(Scotland)
154	13 January 2009	SS Great Britain	Bristol, Gloucestershire	(England)
155	27 January 2009	Newton House	Llandeilo, Carmarthenshire	(Wales)
156	10 February 2009	Madame Tussauds	London	(England)
157	24 February 2009	Wookey Hole	Mendip, Somerset	(England)

== (Most Haunted USA) (2008–2009) ==
Most Haunted USA was an eight-part mini-series that aired on the American Travel Channel from 12 December 2008 to 30 January 2009. The series has also aired in the UK on alternate weeks to Series 12.

#	Original Airdate (UK)	Episode Title	Location	Nation
158	11 November 2008	The Stanley Hotel	Estes Park, Colorado	(United States)
159	25 November 2008	Waverly Hills Sanatorium	Louisville, Kentucky	(United States)
160	9 December 2008	West Virginia State Penitentiary	Moundsville, West Virginia	(United States)
161	23 December 2008	Sleepy Hollow	Mount Pleasant, New York	(United States)
162	6 January 2009	Ledge Light House	New London, Connecticut	(United States)
163	20 January 2009	Fort Delaware	Pea Patch Island, Delaware	(United States)
164	3 February 2009	The Southern Mansion	Cape May, New Jersey	(United States)
165	3 March 2009	The Conference House	Staten Island, New York	(United States)

== Series 13 (2009) ==
#	Original Airdate	Episode Title	Location	Nation
166	13 October 2009	Speke Hall	Liverpool, Merseyside	(England)
167	20 October 2009	Inveraray Jail	Inveraray, Argyll	(Scotland)
168	27 October 2009	Layer Marney Tower	Colchester, Essex	(England)
169	3 November 2009	The Gaumont Cinema	Liverpool, Merseyside	(England)
170	10 November 2009	Inveraray Castle	Inveraray, Argyll	(Scotland)
171	17 November 2009	The Kelvedon Hatch Nuclear Bunker	Brentwood, Essex	(England)
172	24 November 2009	The Tolbooth	Aberdeen, Aberdeenshire	(Scotland)
173	1 December 2009	Cromer Pier	Cromer, Norfolk	(England)
174	8 December 2009	Castle Fraser	Kemnay, Aberdeenshire	(Scotland)
175	15 December 2009	The Edward Jenner Museum	Berkeley, Gloucestershire	(England)

== Live Series (2010) ==
A Live Series of 'Most Haunted' was broadcast every Saturday on Living, live for two hours. The Live Series ended on 13 March 2010

#	Airdate	Location			Theme
1	23 January 2010	Bodelwyddan Castle	Denbighshire	(Wales)	Live Series
2	30 January 2010	Tatton Old Hall	Knutsford, Cheshire	(England)	Live Series
3	6 February 2010	Capesthorne Hall	Siddington, Cheshire	(England)	Live Series
4	13 February 2010	Gawthorpe Hall	Ightenhill, Burnley, Lancashire	(England)	Live Series
5	20 February 2010	Rufford Old Hall	Rufford, Lancashire	(England)	Live Series
6	27 February 2010	Golden Grove Mansion	Llangathen, Carmarthenshire	(Wales)	Live Series
7	6 March 2010	Lincoln Prison	Lincoln, Lincolnshire	(England)	Live Series
8	13 March 2010	Dalston Hall	Dalston, Cumbria	(England)	Live Series

== Series 14 (2010) ==
#	Original Airdate	Episode Title	Location	Nation
176	12 May 2010	Weald and Downland Museum (Part 1)	Singleton, West Sussex,	(England)
177	19 May 2010	Weald and Downland Museum (Part 2)	Singleton, West Sussex,	(England)
178	26 May 2010	Gregynog Hall	Newtown, Powys	(Wales)
179	2 June 2010	Berkeley Castle	Berkeley, Gloucestershire	(England)
180	9 June 2010	Carlisle Castle	Carlisle, Cumbria	(England)
181	16 June 2010	Kiplin Hall	Richmond, North Yorkshire	(England)
182	23 June 2010	The Verdley Woods	Verdley, Sussex	(England)
183	30 June 2010	Brinkburn Priory	Rothbury, Northumberland	(England)
184	7 July 2010	Maesmawr Hall Hotel	Caersws, Powys	(Wales)
185	21 July 2010	Belsay Hall	Morpeth, Northumberland	(England)

== Series 15 (2014) ==
#	Original Airdate	Episode Title	Location	Nation
186	21 August 2014	Royal Court Theatre	Bacup, Lancashire	(England)
187	28 August 2014	Newton House (Part 1) (with Bullet for My Valentine)	Llandeilo, Carmarthenshire	(Wales)
188	4 September 2014	Newton House (Part 2) (with Bullet for My Valentine)	Llandeilo, Carmarthenshire	(Wales)
189	11 September 2014	The Galleries of Justice	Nottingham, Nottinghamshire	(England)
190	18 September 2014	Delapré Abbey (with the England Rugby Team)	Northampton, Northamptonshire	(England)
191	25 September 2014	The National Emergency Services Museum	Sheffield, South Yorkshire	(England)
192	2 October 2014	Ye Olde Kings Head	Chester, Cheshire	(England)
193	9 October 2014	Drakelow Tunnels	Kidderminster, Worcestershire	(England)
194	16 October 2014	Saltmarshe Hall (Part 1)	Howden, East Riding of Yorkshire	(England)
195	23 October 2014	Saltmarshe Hall (Part 2)	Howden, East Riding of Yorkshire	(England)

== Series 16 (2015) ==
#	Original Airdate	Episode Title	Location	Nation
196	4 June 2015	The Tivoli Venue	Buckley, Flintshire	(Wales)
197	11 June 2015	Tatton Old Hall	Knutsford, Cheshire	(England)
198	18 June 2015	Annison Funeral Parlour	Kingston-upon-Hull, East Riding of Yorkshire	(England)
199	25 June 2015	Fort Paull (Part 1)	Kingston-upon-Hull, East Riding of Yorkshire	(England)
200	2 July 2015	Fort Paull (Part 2)	Kingston-upon-Hull, East Riding of Yorkshire	(England)
201	9 July 2015	Wentworth Woodhouse (Part 1)	Rotherham, South Yorkshire	(England)
202	16 July 2015	Wentworth Woodhouse (Part 2)	Rotherham, South Yorkshire	(England)
203	23 July 2015	Oakwell Hall	Batley, West Yorkshire	(England)
204	30 July 2015	Knottingley Town Hall	Knottingley, West Yorkshire	(England)
205	6 August 2015	Capesthorne Hall	Macclesfield, Cheshire	(England)

== Series 17 (2015) ==
#	Original Airdate	Episode Title	Location	Nation
206	18 October 2015	30 East Drive (Part 1)	Pontefract, West Yorkshire	(England)
207	25 October 2015	30 East Drive (Part 2)	Pontefract, West Yorkshire	(England)
208	1 November 2015	Thackray Museum	Leeds, West Yorkshire	(England)
209	8 November 2015	Armley Mills	Leeds, West Yorkshire	(England)
210	15 November 2015	Carr House	Calderdale, West Yorkshire	(England)
211	22 November 2015	Hill House (Part 1)	Sandbach, Cheshire	(England)
212	29 November 2015	Hill House (Part 2)	Sandbach, Cheshire	(England)
213	6 December 2015	Village Church Farm House	Skegness, Lincolnshire	(England)
214	13 December 2015	The Old Nick Theatre	Gainsborough, Lincolnshire	(England)
215	20 December 2015	Black Country Museum	Dudley, West Midlands	(England)

== Series 18 (2016) ==
#	Original Airdate	Episode Title	Location	Nation
216	30 June 2016	Lyceum Theatre	Crewe, Cheshire	(England)
217	7 July 2016	Whittington Castle	Whittington, Shropshire	(England)
218	14 July 2016	Halsham House	Halsham, East Riding of Yorkshire	(England)
219	21 July 2016	Mansion House Care Home	St Helens, Merseyside	(England)
220	28 July 2016	Walton Hall	Warrington, Cheshire	(England)
221	4 August 2016	Oak House	West Bromwich, West Midlands	(England)
222	11 August 2016	Middleton Hall	Middleton, Warwickshire	(England)
223	18 August 2016	HMP Shrewsbury (Part 1)	Shrewsbury, Shropshire	(England)
224	25 August 2016	HMP Shrewsbury (Part 2)	Shrewsbury, Shropshire	(England)
225	1 September 2016	HMP Shrewsbury (Part 3)	Shrewsbury, Shropshire	(England)

== Series 19 (2017) ==
#	Original Airdate	Episode Title	Location	Nation
226	14 April 2017	Abbey House Museum	Leeds, West Yorkshire	(England)
227	21 April 2017	Wentworth Woodhouse Stables	Rotherham, South Yorkshire	(England)
228	28 April 2017	The Slaughter House	Liverpool, Merseyside	(England)
229	5 May 2017	Todmorden Unitarian Church	Todmorden, West Yorkshire	(England)
230	12 May 2017	Weir Mill	Stockport, Greater Manchester	(England)
231	19 May 2017	Ripon Union Workhouse	Ripon, North Yorkshire	(England)
232	26 May 2017	Old Prison	Ripon, North Yorkshire	(England)
233	2 June 2017	Standon Hall (Part 1)	Standon, Staffordshire	(England)
234	9 June 2017	Standon Hall (Part 2)	Standon, Staffordshire	(England)
235	16 June 2017	Standon Hall (Part 3)	Standon, Staffordshire	(England)

== Series 20 (2017) ==
#	Original Airdate	Episode Title	Location	Nation
236	27 October 2017	Rowley's House	Shrewsbury, Shropshire	(England)
237	28 October 2017	The Fleece Inn	Elland, West Yorkshire	(England)
238	29 October 2017	Haden Hill House (Part 1)	Haden Hill, West Midlands	(England)
239	30 October 2017	Haden Hill House (Part 2)	Haden Hill, West Midlands	(England)
240	31 October 2017	Croxteth Hall (Part 1) ('As Live' Edition)	Liverpool, Merseyside	(England)
241	1 November 2017	Croxteth Hall (Part 2)	Liverpool, Merseyside	(England)
242	3 November 2017	The Old House	Coalville, Leicestershire	(England)
243	10 November 2017	The Keighley Bus Museum	Keighley, West Yorkshire	(England)
244	17 November 2017	The Judges' Lodgings (Part 1)	Presteigne, Powys, Wales	(Wales)
245	24 November 2017	The Judges' Lodgings (Part 2)	Presteigne, Powys, Wales	(Wales)

== Series 21 (2018) ==
#	Original Airdate	Episode Title	Location	Nation
246	19 January 2018	Birmingham Central Lockup	Birmingham, West Midlands	(England)
247	26 January 2018	The Union Workhouse (Part 1)	Llanfyllin, Powys	(Wales)
248	2 February 2018	The Union Workhouse (Part 2)	Llanfyllin, Powys	(Wales)
249	9 February 2018	Beaumanor Hall (Part 1)	Woodhouse, Leicestershire	(England)
250	16 February 2018	Beaumanor Hall (Part 2)	Woodhouse, Leicestershire	(England)
251	23 February 2018	Dudley Castle	Dudley, West Midlands	(England)
252	2 March 2018	Codnor Castle Cottage (Part 1) ('As Live' Edition)	Codnor, Derbyshire	(England)
253	9 March 2018	Codnor Castle Cottage (Part 2) ('As Live' Edition)	Codnor, Derbyshire	(England)
254	16 March 2018	Moat House (Part 1)	Tamworth, Staffordshire	(England)
255	23 March 2018	Moat House (Part 2)	Tamworth, Staffordshire	(England)

== Series 22 (2018) ==
#	Original Airdate	Episode Title	Location	Nation
256	19 October 2018	Ashwell Prison (Part 1) ('As Live' Edition)	Burley, Rutland	(England)
257	20 October 2018	Ashwell Prison (Part 2) ('As Live' Edition)	Burley, Rutland	(England)
258	21 October 2018	Bate Inn (Part 1)	Macclesfield, Cheshire	(England)
259	22 October 2018	Bate Inn (Part 2)	Macclesfield, Cheshire	(England)
260	23 October 2018	Castell Rhuthun (Part 1)	Ruthin, Vale of Clwyd	(Wales)
261	24 October 2018	Castell Rhuthun (Part 2)	Ruthin, Vale of Clwyd	(Wales)
262	25 October 2018	Ancient High House	Stafford, Staffordshire	(England)
263	26 October 2018	Leopard Inn (Part 1)	Burslem, Stoke-on-Trent, Staffordshire	(England)
264	27 October 2018	Leopard Inn (Part 2)	Burslem, Stoke-on-Trent, Staffordshire	(England)
265	28 October 2018	Leopard Inn (Part 3)	Burslem, Stoke-on-Trent, Staffordshire	(England)

== Series 23 (2019) ==
#	Original Airdate	Episode Title	Location	Nation
266	11 January 2019	Eden Camp Museum (Part 1) ('As Live' Edition)	Malton, North Yorkshire	(England)
267	18 January 2019	Eden Camp Museum (Part 2) ('As Live' Edition)	Malton, North Yorkshire	(England)
268	25 January 2019	Antwerp Mansion	Manchester	(England)
269	1 February 2019	Hodroyd Hall (Part 1)	Barnsley, South Yorkshire	(England)
270	8 February 2019	Hodroyd Hall (Part 2)	Barnsley, South Yorkshire	(England)
271	15 February 2019	Hodroyd Hall (Part 3)	Barnsley, South Yorkshire	(England)
272	22 February 2019	Kelham Hall (Part 1)	Kelham, Nottinghamshire	(England)
273	1 March 2019	Kelham Hall (Part 2)	Kelham, Nottinghamshire	(England)
274	8 March 2019	Guy's Cliffe House (Part 1)	Guy's Cliffe, Warwickshire	(England)
275	15 March 2019	Guy's Cliffe House (Part 2)	Guy's Cliffe, Warwickshire	(England)

== Most Haunted Shorts/Extra (2019–) ==
Most Haunted Shorts is a series that includes episodes that have never been shown on television. The series has been aired on the Official YouTube channel. In November 2019, Karl Beattie stated "As the Most Haunted Shorts are getting longer, we are now calling them 'Extras'" announcing a brand new Most Haunted Extra to be released the following week.

#	Original Airdate	Episode Title	Location	Nation
276	14 June 2019	Shirehall, Hereford / Castell Rhuthun	Hereford, Herefordshire / Ruthin, Vale of Clwyd	(England) / (Wales)
277	5 July 2019	HMP Shrewsbury	Shrewsbury, Shropshire	(England)
278	28 September 2019	Accrington Police Station	Accrington, Lancashire	(England)
279	29 September 2019	The Galleries of Justice	Nottingham, Nottinghamshire	(England)
280	7 November 2019	Drakelow Tunnels / Eden Camp Museum	Kidderminster, Worcestershire / Malton, North Yorkshire	(England)
281	14 November 2019	Capesthorne Hall	Macclesfield, Cheshire	(England)
282	21 November 2019	Fort Amherst	Medway, Kent	(England)
283	1 February 2020	Castell Rhuthun / HMP Shrewsbury / Armley Mills	Ruthin, Vale of Clwyd / Shrewsbury, Shropshire / Leeds, West Yorkshire	(Wales) / (England)
284	7 March 2020	HMP Shrewsbury / Penylan	Shrewsbury, Shropshire / Penylan, Cardiff	(England) / (Wales)
285	19 March 2020	Coats Memorial Church	Paisley, Renfrewshire	(Scotland)
286	21 March 2020	Champness Hall	Rochdale, Greater Manchester	(England)
287	26 March 2020	Gressenhall Farm and Workhouse	Norfolk, East Anglia	(England)
288	2 April 2020	Nunnington Hall / SS Great Britain / Drakelow Tunnels	North Yorkshire / Bristol Kidderminster, Worcestershire	(England)
289	9 April 2020	York Castle Museum	York, North Yorkshire	(England)
290	16 April 2020	HMP Gloucester Prison	Gloucester, Gloucestershire	(England)
291	28 October 2020	Towneley Hall Part 1	Burnley, Lancashire	(England)
292	29 October 2020	Towneley Hall Part 2	Burnley, Lancashire	(England)
293	30 October 2020	Hodroyd Hall	Barnsley, South Yorkshire	(England)
294	31 October 2020	Woolton Hall	Woolton, Liverpool	(England)
295	1 November 2020	SS Great Britain / Towneley Hall	Bristol / Lancashire	(England)
296	2 November 2020	Accrington Police Station & Courts Part 1	Accrington, Lancashire	(England)
297	3 November 2020	Accrington Police Station & Courts Part 2	Accrington, Lancashire	(England)
298	27 December 2020	HMP Gloucester Prison Part 1	Gloucester, Gloucestershire	(England)
299	28 December 2020	HMP Gloucester Prison Part 2	Gloucester, Gloucestershire	(England)
300	25 June 2021	Botanic Garden Museum	Southport	(England)
301	14 October 2021	Bron-y-Garth Hospital & Beaumanor Hall Part 1	Penrhyndeudraeth, Gwynedd / Woodhouse, Leicestershire	(Wales) , (England)
302	21 October 2021	Bron-y-Garth Hospital & Beaumanor Hall Part 2	Penrhyndeudraeth, Gwynedd / Woodhouse, Leicestershire	(Wales) , (England)
303	24 December 2021	Delapré Abbey Part 1	Northampton, Northamptonshire	(England)
304	24 December 2021	Delapré Abbey Part 2	Northampton, Northamptonshire	(England)
305	25 December 2021	Ruthin Castle Part 1	Ruthin, Denbighshire	(Wales)
306	25 December 2021	Ruthin Castle Part 2	Ruthin, Denbighshire	(Wales)
307	25 December 2021	Ruthin Castle Part 3	Ruthin, Denbighshire	(Wales)
308	25 December 2021	Ruthin Castle Part 4	Ruthin, Denbighshire	(Wales)
309	27 December 2021	Bishton Hall	Wolseley Bridge, Staffordshire	(England)
310	5 March 2022	Nothe Fort (Part 1)	Weymouth	(England)
311	6 March 2022	Nothe Fort (Part 2)	Weymouth	(England)
312	19 March 2022	Dorchester Prison Part 1	Dorchester, Dorset	(England)
313	19 March 2022	Dorchester Prison Part 2	Dorchester, Dorset	(England)
314	1 April 2023	Bishton Hall Part 1	Wolseley Bridge, Staffordshire	(England)
315	1 April 2023	Bishton Hall Part 2	Wolseley Bridge, Staffordshire	(England)
316	1 April 2023	Bishton Hall Part 3	Wolseley Bridge, Staffordshire	(England)
317	14 September 2023	Return to Pendle Hill	Pendle Hill, Lancashire	(England)
318	31 October 2023	Gisburne Park Part 1	Gisburn, Lancashire	(England)
319	1 November 2023	Gisburne Park Part 2	Gisburn, Lancashire	(England)
320	2 November 2023	Gisburne Park Part 3	Gisburn, Lancashire	(England)
321	3 November 2023	Gisburne Park Part 4	Gisburn, Lancashire	(England)
322	4 November 2023	Gisburne Park Part 5	Gisburn, Lancashire	(England)
323	16 November 2023	Abbey House Museum Part 1	Kirkstall, West Yorkshire	(England)
324	23 November 2023	Abbey House Museum Part 2	Kirkstall, West Yorkshire	(England)
325	30 November 2023	Eden Camp Cottage Part 1	Malton, North Yorkshire	(England)
326	7 December 2023	Eden Camp Cottage Part 2	Malton, North Yorkshire	(England)
327	14 December 2023	Smithills Hall Part 1	Bolton, Greater Manchester	(England)
328	21 December 2023	Smithills Hall Part 2	Bolton, Greater Manchester	(England)
329	4 January 2024	Gloucester Prison	Barrack Square, Gloucester	(England)

== YouTube Specials ==
Original Airdate	Episode Title	Location	Nation
26 May 2019	Most Haunted: Live Investigation at Karl and Yvette's Home	Sandbach, Cheshire	(England)
4 June 2019	Most Haunted: Unseen Vigils Part 1	Guy's Cliffe House, Warwickshire	(England)
22 June 2019	Most Haunted: Outtakes Part 1	Various	(England)
8 November 2019	Karl & Stu at Eden Camp Cottage	Malton, North Yorkshire	(England)
9 November 2019	Yvette & Mary Live	Macclesfield, Cheshire	(England)
31 January 2020	Hello From Accrington	Accrington, Lancashire	(England)
21 March 2020	Karl & Stu in Accrington Live	Accrington, Lancashire	(England)
7 May 2020	Most Haunted: Outtakes Part 2	Various	(England)
15 April 2021	The Ghost Hunter Chronicles: Exclusive Vigil & Book Reading (Beaumanor Hall)	Woodhouse, Leicestershire	(England)

== References and notes ==
Notes

General

- "LIVING: Most Haunted Locations". LIVING. Archived from the original on 28 May 2008.

Specific
