= Listed buildings in South Hiendley =

South Hiendley is a civil parish in the metropolitan borough of the City of Wakefield, West Yorkshire, England. The parish contains 14 listed buildings that are recorded in the National Heritage List for England. Of these, one is listed at Grade I, the highest of the three grades, and the others are at Grade II, the lowest grade. The parish contains the village of South Hiendley and the small settlement of Felkirk, and the surrounding countryside. The listed buildings consist of a church with monuments, a cross shaft, and a schoolroom in the churchyard, two houses, and a set of almshouses in two ranges and with a master's lodge.

== Key ==
Grade	Criteria
I	Particularly important buildings of more than special interest
II	Buildings of national importance and special interest

== Buildings ==
Name and location	Photograph	Date	Notes	Grade
St Peter's Church, Felkirk; 53.60858°N 1.41665°W		13th century	The church, which incorporates some reused Norman fabric, has been altered and extended, and was restored in 1875. It is built in sandstone with stone slate roofs, and consists of a nave with a clerestory, north and south aisles, a south porch, a chancel with a north aisle and vestry and a south chapel, and a west tower. The tower is in Perpendicular style, with three stages, diagonal buttresses, an arched west doorway and a four-light west window, and at the top are gargoyles and an embattled parapet with crocketed pinnacles at the corners and centres.	I
The Old Schoolroom; 53.60869°N 1.41624°W		16th century (probable)	The former schoolroom in the churchyard of St Peter's Church is in sandstone with a stone slate roof. There is a single storey and two bays. The central doorway has a moulded Tudor arch, and is flanked by buttresses. In each bay is a five-light mullioned window, each light with a Tudor arch and hollow spandrels, and above is a hood mould. At the rear are two inserted three-light casement windows.	II
Hodroyd Hall; 53.60988°N 1.41107°W		17th century	The house, which was remodelled and enlarged in the 19th century, is in sandstone on a chamfered plinth, with stone slate roofs. There are two storeys and attics, at one time it had an H-shaped plan, later the additions at the rear have given an irregular plan. The main front is on the west, with a three-bay gabled central range, and projecting gabled wings. In the centre is a two-storey bay window containing transomed windows, flanked by cross windows, and a three-light mullioned window in the attic. Elsewhere there are similar windows, single-light windows and sashes, some sliding, and many of the windows have hood moulds. At the rear is a two-storey porch and a three-light transomed stair window.	II
Cross shaft 53.60844°N 1.41648°W	—	Late medieval (probable)	The cross shaft is in sandstone. It has a square base with moulded corners, a square socket in the centre, and a chamfered shaft about 1 metre (3 ft 3 in) high with a moulded top.	II
Green, Bedford and Dunhill monuments 53.60845°N 1.41638°W	—	Early 18th century	The monuments are in the churchyard of St Peter's Church. They consist of a row of four monumental slabs to the memory of members of the Green, Bedford and Dunhill families. They have inscriptions, and are carved with various motifs and decorations.	II
Green monument 53.60834°N 1.41654°W	—	Early 18th century	The monument is in the churchyard of St Peter's Church, and is to the memory of members of the Green family. It consists of a monumental slab, with a grooved margin to a round-headed panel, and has carved spandrels and inscriptions.	II
Parkinson monument 53.60847°N 1.41662°W	—	Early 18th century	The monument is in the churchyard of St Peter's Church, and is to the memory of Joseph Parkinson. It consists of a monumental slab, and is in sandstone, with carved decoration in the head.	II
Richardson monument 53.60844°N 1.41669°W	—	Early 18th century	The monument is in the churchyard of St Peter's Church, and is to the memory of members of the Richardson family. It consists of a monumental slab, with a foliated border, carved raised foliated decoration on the head, and an inscription.	II
Watson tomb chest 53.60842°N 1.41684°W	—	Early 18th century	The tomb chest is in the churchyard of St Peter's Church, and is to the memory of members of the Watson family. It is in sandstone, with a moulded base, fluted corner pilasters, and rusticated central pilasters. The lid has a moulded rim, a fielded shouldered panel, carved sunk spandrels, and an inscription.	II
Felkirk House; 53.60841°N 1.416807°W	—	Early to mid 18th century	The oldest part of the house is the rear wing, with the main range dating from the early 19th century. It is in sandstone with a hipped slate roof. There are two storeys, an L-shaped plan, with a symmetrical front of three bays and a rear wing. The central doorway has a moulded architrave, a rectangular fanlight, and a small cornice. Most of the windows are sashes, and there is a French window in the rear wing.	II
Methley tomb chest 53.60831°N 1.41662°W	—	Early 19th century	The tomb chest is in the churchyard of St Peter's Church, and is to the memory of Robert Methley, a merchant, and members of his family. It is in sandstone, with side panels, a lid with a moulded lid, and a decorated head.	II
North Range, Holgate's Hospital, 53.60818°N 1.37965°W		1859–60	One of two ranges of almshouses consisting of a central chapel flanked by six cottages on each side. The buildings are in red brick with bands of blue brick, sandstone dressings, and a tile roof. The cottages have a single storey and are arranged in pairs, each with a recessed porch and bay windows with stepped parapets. Each porch has a trefoil-headed arch and a gablet with a stepped apex, and in the centre of each range is a semicircular bay window with a conical roof. The chapel has a front of two storeys and two bays, flanked by pilasters with pyramidal roofs. In the centre is a pilaster rising higher, and containing the statue of a bishop under a cusped canopy. At the top is a diagonally-set bellcote with a pyramidal roof and a weathervane.	II
South Range, Holgate's Hospital, 53.60753°N 1.37961°W		1859–60	One of two ranges of almshouses that was extended in 1913, consisting of a central entrance archway and porter's lodge, flanked by six cottages on each side, the outer cottages added later and slightly larger. The buildings are in red brick with bands of blue brick, sandstone dressings, and a tile roof. The cottages have a single storey and are arranged in pairs, each with a recessed porch and bay windows with stepped parapets. Each porch has a trefoil-headed arch and a gablet with a stepped apex, and in the centre of each range is a semicircular bay window with a conical roof. The central block has two storeys and three bays, and an archway flanked by chamfered pilasters with gablets. The arch has a lettered and dated inscription, and above it is a two-light window with a pointed arch. The outer bays contain windows that have lights with cusped heads.	II
Master's Lodge, Holgate's Hospital; 53.60799°N 1.38117°W	—	c. 1860	The lodge is in brick with sandstone dressings, sill bands, a saw-tooth eaves band, and a tile roof with coped gables and kneelers. There are two storeys and attics, a main range with six bays, and a two-bay rear wing. On the front, the first bay is gabled and acts as a cross-wing, the third bay is gabled and contains a two-storey bay window, and the fifth bay has a gabled attic dormer. In the second bay is a porch with three arches, the central arch higher, and has columns with crocketed capitals, a hood mould, and a stepped parapet. In the left return are two two-storey bay windows, one rectangular and gabled, the other canted with a hipped roof.	II
