= HM Prison Ashwell =

Former prison located in Rutland, England

Coordinates: 52.6918°N 0.7179°W

HMP Ashwell
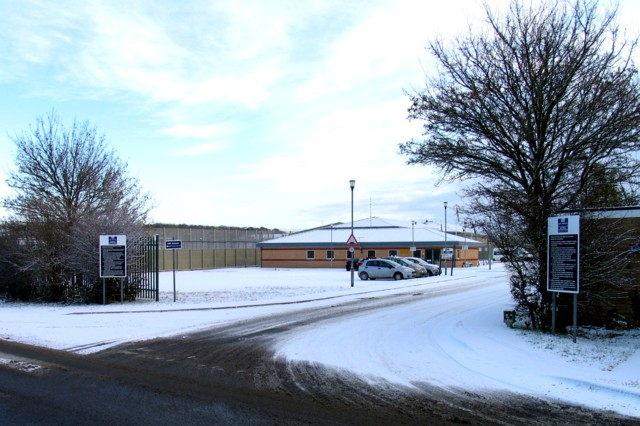
- Entrance to HMP Ashwell in 2010
- Interactive map of HMP Ashwell
- Location: Burley, Rutland
- Status: Closed
- Security class: Adult Male/Category C
- Opened: 1955
- Closed: 2011
- Managed by: HM Prison Service

HM Prison Ashwell was a Category C men's prison located in the parish of Burley, in the county of Rutland, England. The site of the former prison is located about two miles south of the centre of the village of Ashwell, alongside the road to Oakham and opposite the former kennels of the Cottesmore Hunt.

The prison closed in 2011 and Rutland County Council acquired it from the Ministry of Justice in early 2013. The site has been redeveloped as Oakham Enterprise Park, a business park for office and light industrial use.

== History ==
Ashwell Prison was constructed on the site of a Second World War US army base (home to part of the 82nd Airborne Division), and first opened in 1955 as an open prison for adult male prisoners. In October 1987 it was converted to an Adult Male Category C establishment.

In 2003 Ashwell Prison hit the headlines after four prisoners went on a wrecking spree, damaging £10,000 worth of office equipment, computers and windows. The trouble started when an officer found an inmate had been drinking alcohol in his cell. Despite this incident Ashwell achieved Resettlement Stage 1 accreditation in the same year.

A 2005 inspection report of Ashwell cited concerns about prisoners' vulnerability, race relations and the quality of work and training at the prison. In the same year an inmate at the prison escaped from guards while receiving treatment for tuberculosis at the Leicester Royal Infirmary. The prisoner was recaptured days later.

In July 2008 a new £6m wing with an additional 64 cells was opened at Ashwell Prison. The new wing increased the overall capacity of the prison to 619 inmates.

A major riot at Ashwell Prison began on 11 April 2009. During the riot, a three-mile police perimeter was put in place, which extended to the edges of Oakham. Several prisoners were evacuated from the prison. Trouble started at approximately 0100 BST on 11 April and a fire broke out at the prison during the afternoon. The riot was brought under control at 2245 BST that day. The operation launched by authorities in response to the riot was called Operation Tornado which saw the introduction of specialist riot-trained prison staff. Three prisoners were injured and 75% of the prison was made uninhabitable. The riot started when a prisoner, serving a three-year sentence, confronted staff and refused to return to his room. He began to cause damage and was joined by others. The unrest spread quickly throughout the prison and approximately 400 prisoners are thought to have participated. No member of staff was injured or directly attacked.

The damage done to three of the old wings was substantial. The rest of the prison was either undamaged or sustained superficial damage. The event provoked questioning of the UK's overcrowded prison system leading to Category B prisoners' downgrading so that they can be moved to Category C prisons. In January 2011, it was announced that Ashwell Prison was to close, as the cost of repairing and maintaining the building was too high. The prison formally closed at the end of March 2011, when all inmates had transferred to other prisons.

In 2013, Rutland County Council bought the former prison from the Ministry of Justice to convert the site into a business park. The site was redeveloped throughout 2013, with some accommodation blocks damaged during the riots demolished and new units built in their place. Oakham Enterprise Park has now opened with some units converted for business use. Some of the original buildings remain together with the fence; those are used for airsoft events, military training, and filming.

== Notable former inmates ==
- Lee Hughes, the professional footballer spent time in Ashwell from 2004 after being convicted of death by dangerous driving. Hughes went on to become manager of the prison's football team.
