= Hodroyd Hall =

Coordinates: 53.6099°N 1.411°W

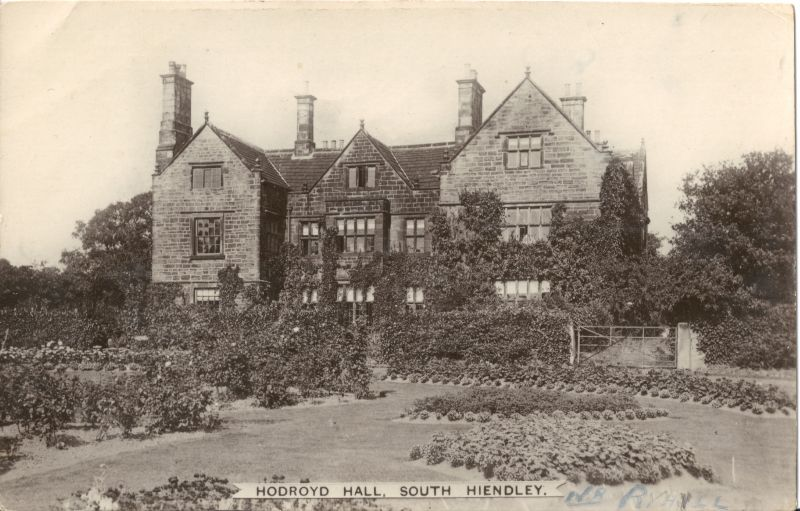
- Postcard of Hodroyd Hall c. 1915

- Location within West Yorkshire
- OS grid reference: SE3906812752
- Metropolitan borough: City of Wakefield
- Metropolitan county: West Yorkshire
- Region: Yorkshire and the Humber
- Country: England
- Sovereign state: United Kingdom
- Police: West Yorkshire
- Fire: West Yorkshire
- Ambulance: Yorkshire

Hodroyd Hall at South Hiendley in the parish of Felkirk near Barnsley in West Yorkshire, England is an Elizabethan manor house currently used as 3 dwellings. It is Grade II listed.

It is built with sandstone, has stone slate roofs, and originally had a rectangular floor plan. Additions have been made at the rear of the building. The building is two-and-a-half storeys, and the principal facade faces west.

== History ==
The Hoydroyd estate was acquired from Nostell Priory by the Gargrave family in the 16th century, and subsequently in the 17th century by Richard Berrie (by marriage), whose wife Prudence endowed the school at the Church of St Peter, Felkirk.

== See also ==
- Listed buildings in South Hiendley
