= Brims Castle =

Coordinates: 58.6165°N 3.6487°W

Brims Castle is a ruined 16th century L-plan tower house on Brims Ness, Highland region, Scotland, to the south of the Pentland Firth, about 5 miles (8 km) north west of Thurso.

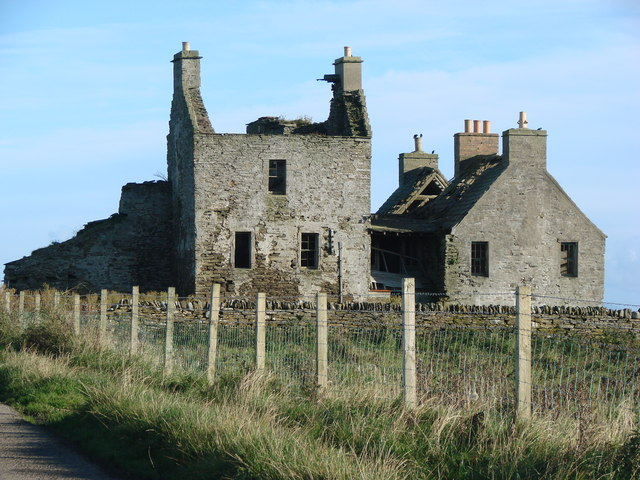
Derelict Farm, Port of Brims

== History ==
The original castle was originally owned by the Sinclairs, passing to different branches of the family. It was occupied until after 1970. By the late twentieth century it was occupied as part of the adjacent farm, but it has become increasingly ruinous, and it is in a dangerous state.

== Structure ==
Brims Ness is a promontory. The castle on it had three storeys and a garret. There was a square stair-wing with a watch-tower on top, but this was replaced by a pitched roof. The entrance at the junction of the main block and the stair jamb has a semi-circular open turret over it. There was a courtyard to the north, now filled with later buildings, which had a sea-gate.

A movable timber stair allowed entrance at the first storey. The hall, on the first storey, was connected by a private stair to the vaulted basement. Apparently there was a bedroom on each of the upper floors, and it is thought that there would have been lean-to bedroom accommodation, along with the kitchen, in the courtyard.

The grounds contain a burial ground and a ruined chapel, dedicated to St John.

== Ghostlore ==
Local ghostlore states that a white lady, the ghost of the daughter of James Sinclair of Uttersquoy is said to haunt the building. Supposedly Patrick Sinclair of Brims was her lover but murdered her and concealed her body in the castle when he had tired of her.
