= Chatham Historic Dockyard =

UK maritime museum

Coordinates: 51°23′48″N 0°31′46″E

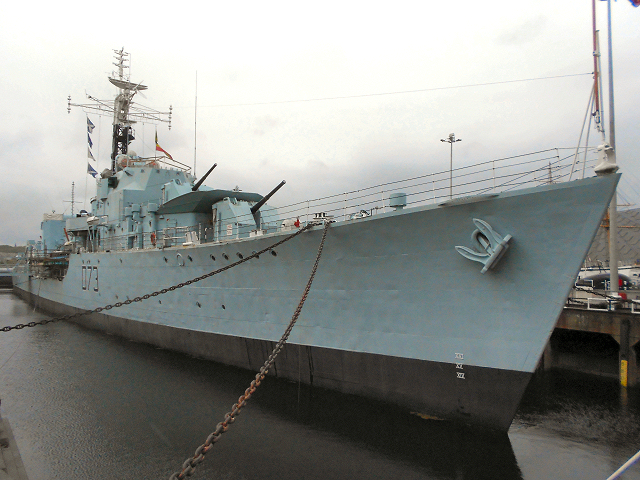
- HMS Cavalier at Chatham Historic Dockyard

- Location within Kent
- Established: 1984
- Location: Chatham, Medway, Kent, England
- Type: Maritime museum
- Owner: Chatham Historic Dockyard Trust

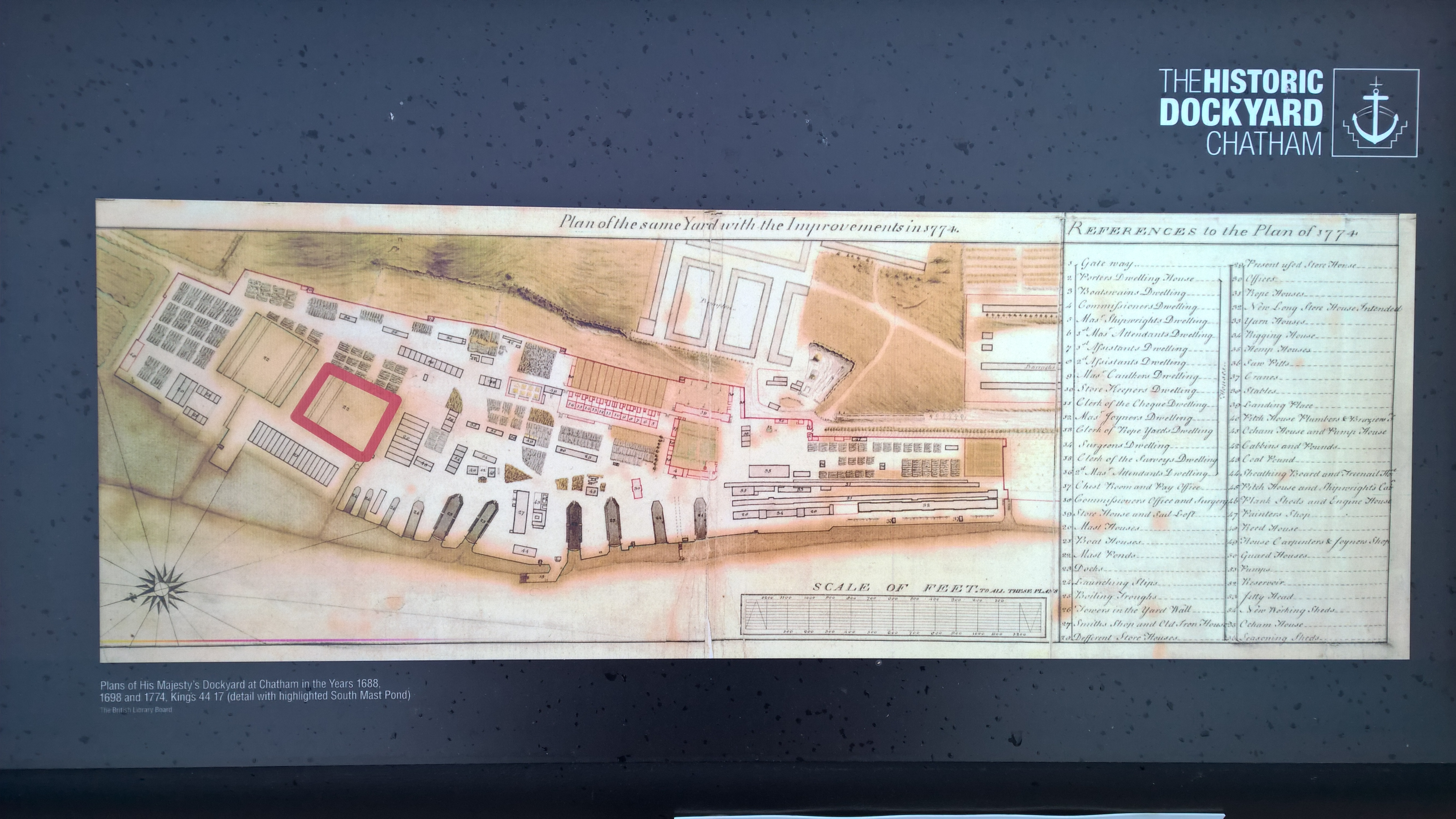
Dockyard Plan of 1774, reproduced on an information panel adjacent to the former South Mast Pond (shown highlighted in red).

The Historic Dockyard Chatham is a maritime museum on part of the site of the former royal/naval dockyard at Chatham in Kent, South East England. Chatham Dockyard covered 400 acres (1.6 km^{2}) and was one of the Royal Navy's main facilities for around 400 years until it was closed on 31 March 1984. After closure the dockyard was divided into three sections. The easternmost basin was handed over to Medway Ports and is now a commercial port, although the landowner plans to close it in 2025. Another slice was converted into a mixed commercial, residential and leisure development. 80 acres (324,000 m^{2}), comprising the 18th-century core of the site, was transferred to a charity called the Chatham Historic Dockyard Trust and is now open as a visitor attraction. It claims to be the world's most complete dockyard of the age of sail.

== Exhibits and displays ==
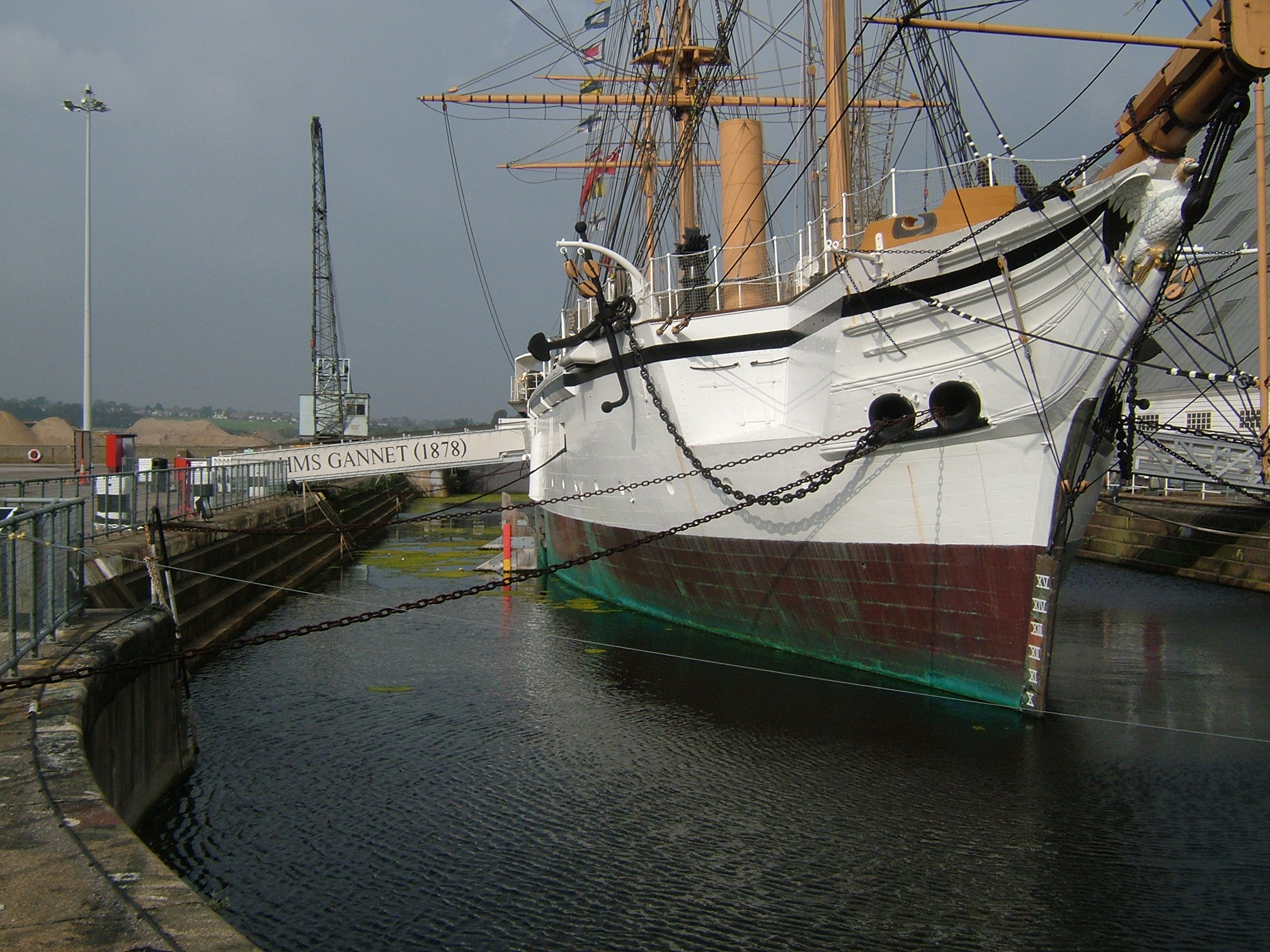
HMS Gannet.

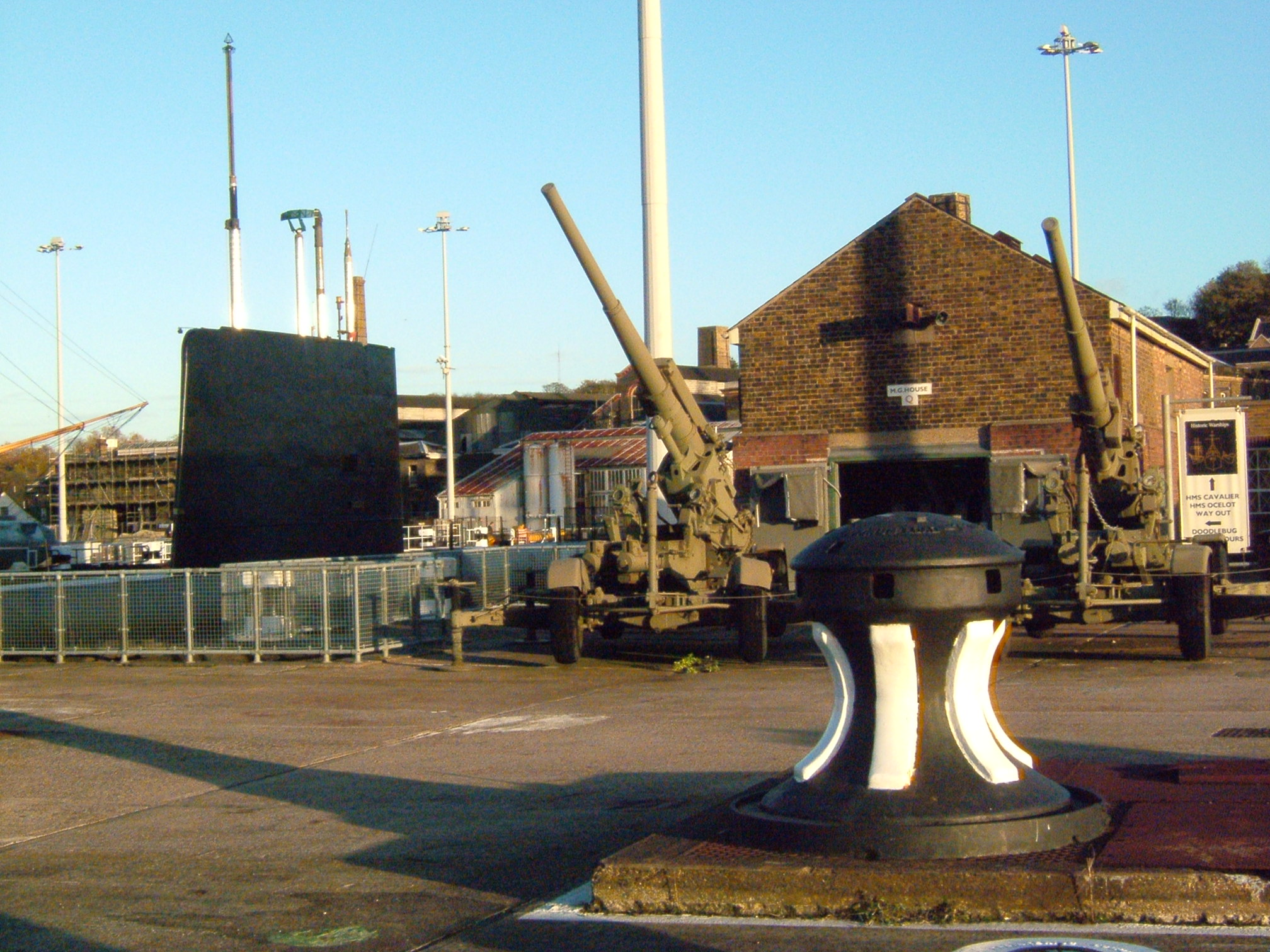
HMS Ocelot on display, with an anti-aircraft gun to the right as part of a display on the Dockyard and the V1 rocket.

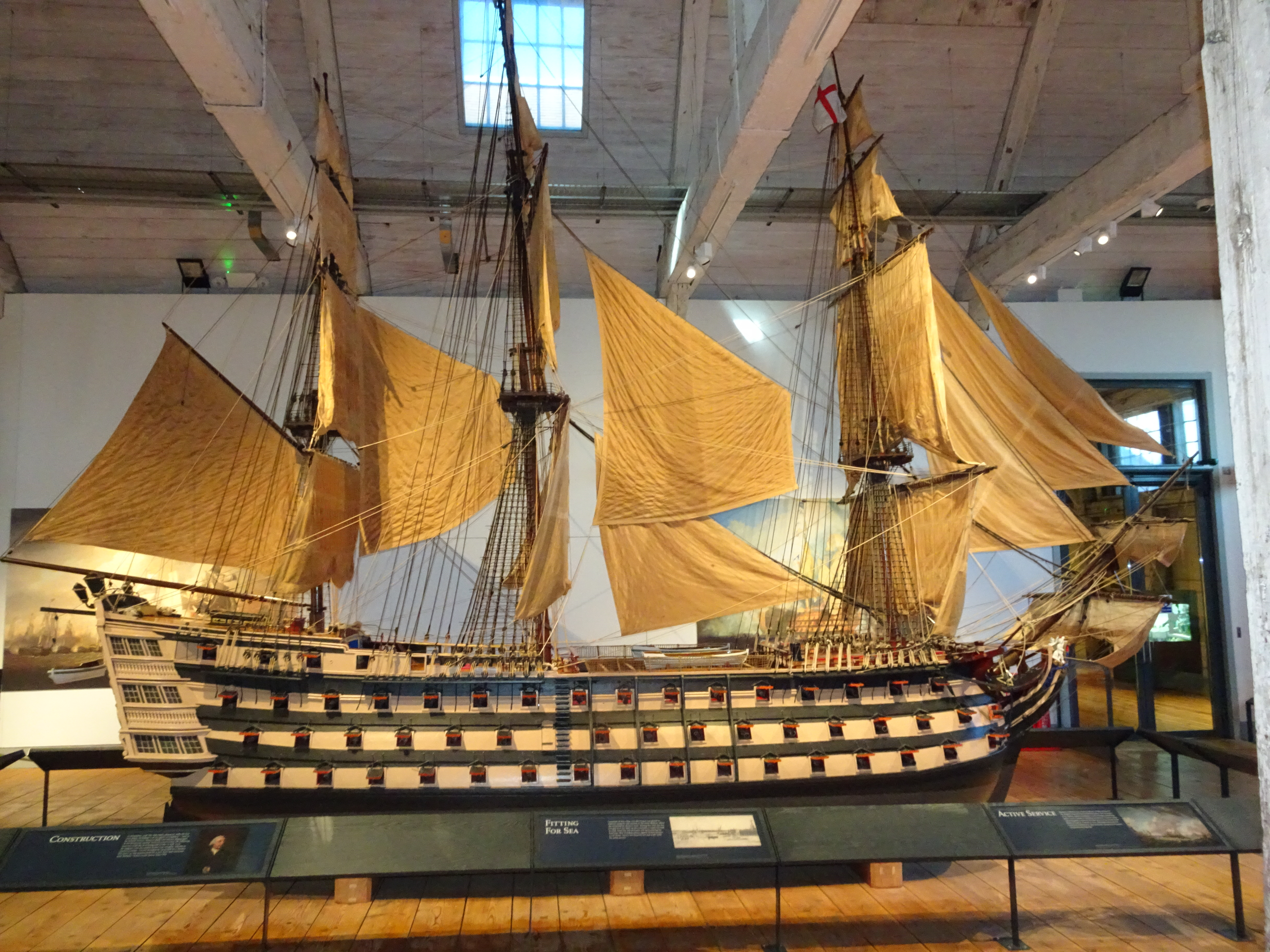
Model of HMS Victory, on display in the Museum of the Royal Dockyard.

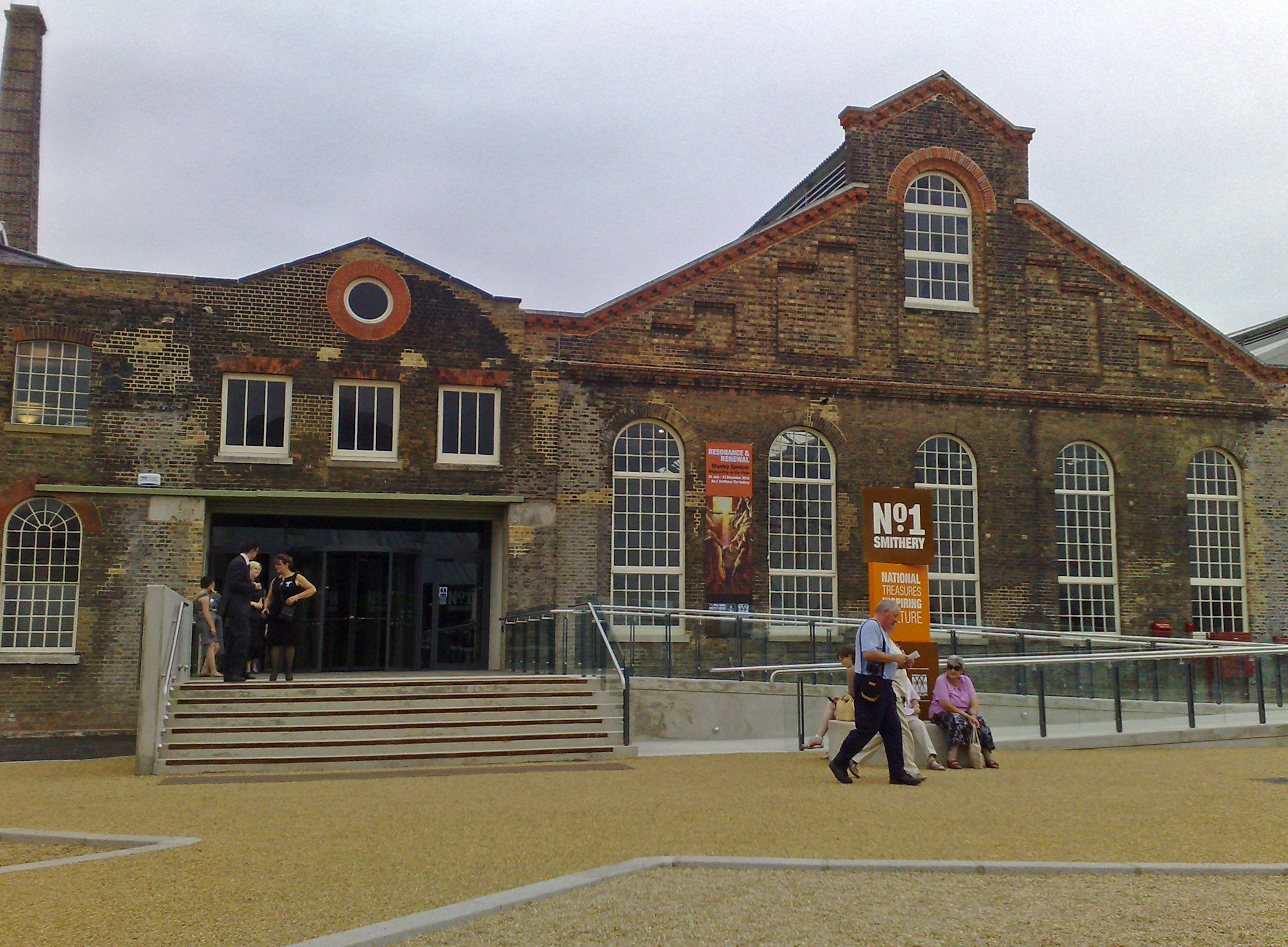
No.1 Smithery, Chatham Historic Dockyard

The attraction has seven main elements:

- Three historic warships:
  - HMS Gannet (1878)
  - HMS Cavalier (R73)
  - HMS Ocelot (S17)
- The Ropery: a Grade I listed building, Georgian and Victorian rope factory.
- Steam, Steel and Submarines: tells the story of Chatham Dockyard and the Royal Navy's use of the River Medway in the 19th and 20th centuries.
- Lifeboat: a museum about the work of the RNLI which has 17 historical vessels.
- 3 Slip – The BIG Store: Originally a covered slipway, now a display of large objects from the dockyard and the nearby Royal Engineers Museum.
- No 1 Smithery: The structure is a Grade II listed building, formerly for iron-working, and a scheduled ancient monument. It was restored by van Heyningen and Haward Architects and re-opened as a visitor and exhibition centre in July 2010. The new building provides dedicated storage and curatorial facilities for the National Maritime Museum and Imperial War Museums' 4,000 ship models as well as a regional touring exhibition gallery, and museum quality permanent exhibition galleries. The first touring exhibition to be shown was Stanley Spencer's Shipbuilding on the Clyde series.

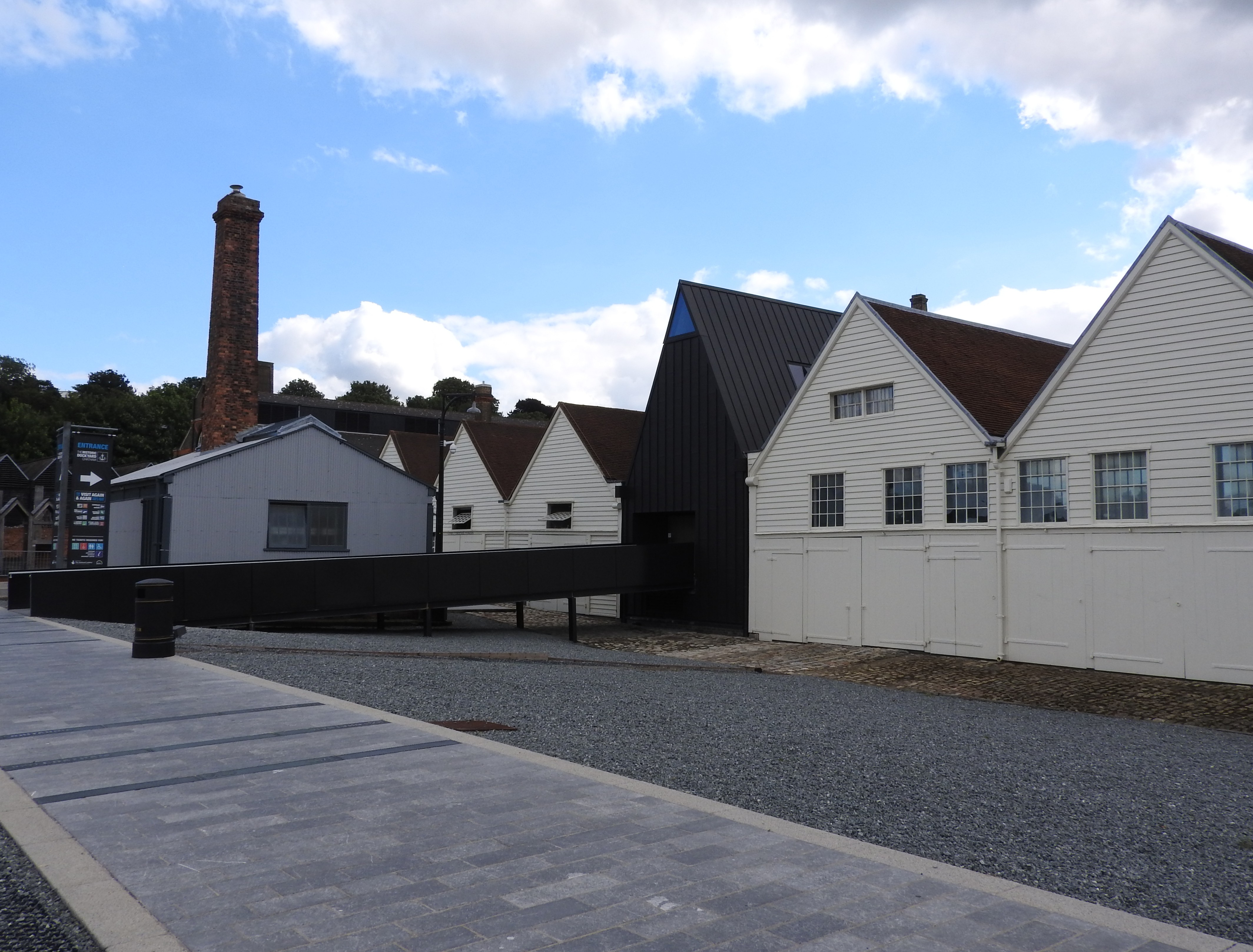
The entrance to 'Command of the Oceans', which was entered into the 2017 Stirling Prize

- A new project for 2014 was Command of the Oceans. This was possible due to £4.53m grant from the Heritage Lottery Fund. Also the project got a £3m contribution from the Homes and Communities Agency. A new entrance was built on the north side of the Command of the Oceans visitor attraction, and a discovery centre linking the former Chatham Dockyard with other significant heritage sites including Fort Amherst, the Great Lines Heritage Park (between Gillingham and Chatham) and Upnor Castle. This all became possible after the remains of the Namur warship was discovered under the floor of the Wheelwrights' Shop in 1995. In 2017, the Command of the Oceans display was shortlisted for the Stirling Prize for excellence in architecture.

Workers at Chatham Historic Dockyard performed eight years of restoration work on the MV Havengore, the ceremonial vessel that carried the body of Winston Churchill during his state funeral. In addition the dockyard acted as custodian of artefacts, masts and rigging from the Cutty Sark and the Medway Queen, while their hulls were being restored elsewhere.

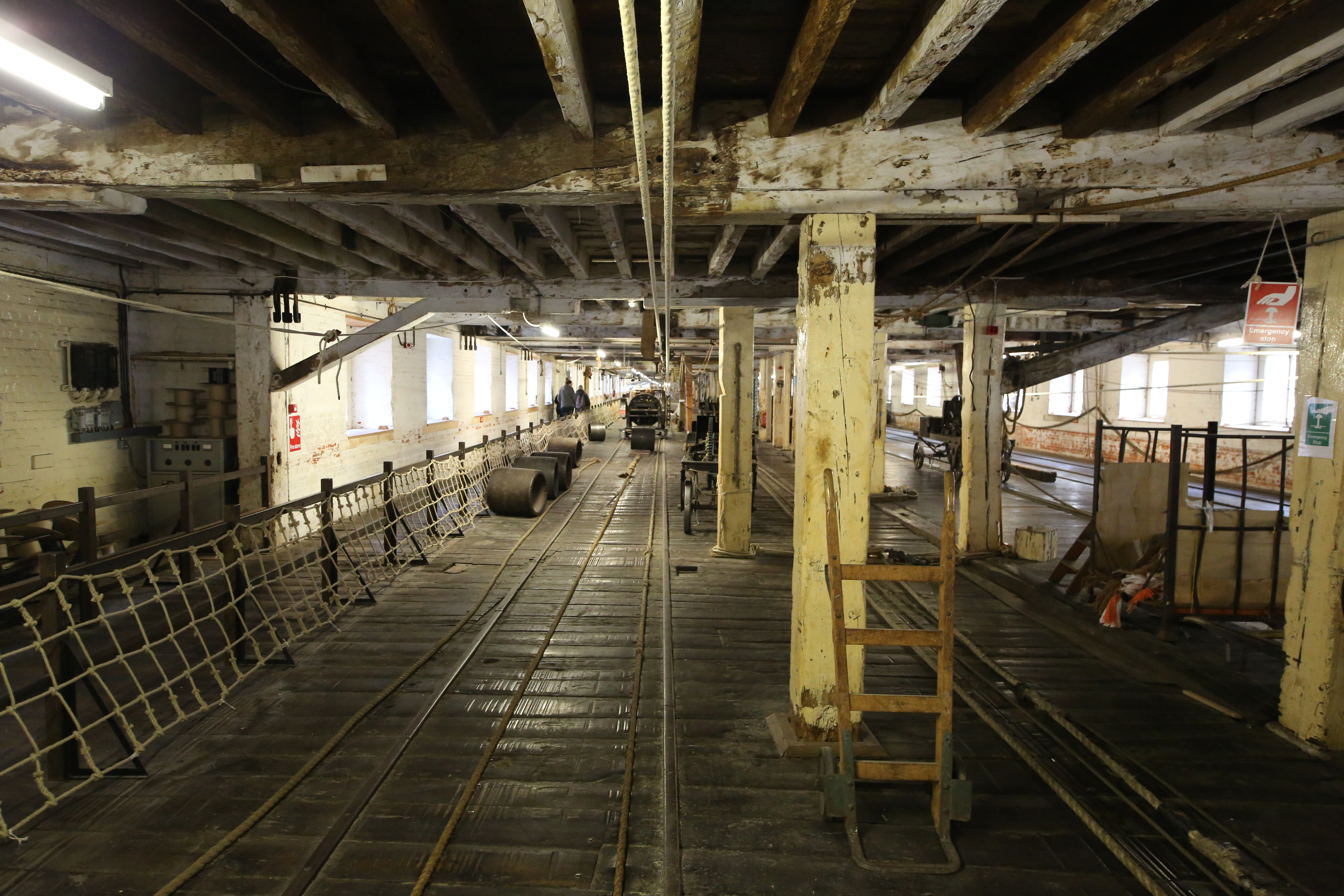
The interior of the ropery

- Records of the ships built at Chatham go back to 1646.
- Chatham Dockyard had one of the best technical schools in England, it housed the first Dockyard School followed by Devonport and Portsmouth. It accepted students from overseas dockyards such as Gibraltar and Malta.
- Some of the hundreds of warships built at the Chatham Royal Dockyard may still be seen. These preserved ships include:
  - HMS Victory (100-gun first rate, i.e. ship of the line launched 1765, preserved in dry dock at Portsmouth, England, UK; Nelson's flagship at Trafalgar)
  - HMS Unicorn (54-gun fifth rate – launched 1824, preserved afloat at Dundee, Scotland, UK)
  - HMS Ocelot (S17) ("O" class submarine – launched 5 May 1962, preserved in dry dock at Chatham).

== Dockyard railway ==
The site is also home to a dockyard railway that has a diverse collection of locomotives and rolling stock, some of which can be seen in operation throughout the year.

=== Steam Locomotives ===
Builder	Wheel arrangement	Number and name	Build date	Notes	Photograph
Robert Stephenson and Hawthorns	0-4-0ST	7042 Ajax	1941	Operational, boiler ticket expires in 2022. Has spent all of its life at Chatham Dockyard	
Andrew Barclay	0-4-0ST	2220 Invicta	1946	Undergoing restoration. Spent all of its working life at Chatham Dockyard. Listed for sale in 2022.	

=== Diesel Locomotives ===
Builder	Wheel arrangement	Number and name	Build date	Notes	Photograph
Andrew Barclay	0-4-0DM	357/WD42 Overlord	1941	Operational. Often on display in the military exhibition.	
F.C. Hibberd	4wDM	3738 Rochester Castle	1955	Operational, has spent all of its life at Chatham Dockyard.	
Drewry	0-4-0DM	2503 Thalia	1954	Operational	

== Use in TV and other media ==
The Historic Dockyard Chatham spans 80 acres, has over 100 buildings and structures dating from the Georgian and Victorian periods to the present day, thus making it an attractive location for period filming over the years.

Some of the shows/films to have used the facilities and locations at Chatham Dockyard are:

- Call The Midwife (Series 1-6 (ongoing)) Used mainly for exterior shots
- SS-GB
- Amazing Grace
- Most Haunted S4E09
- The Halcyon
- The Crown
- Future Tense: The Story of HG Wells
- Mr Selfridge
- Victor Frankenstein
- Jekyll and Hyde
- Suffragette
- The Man From UNCLE
- Grantchester
- Muppets Most Wanted
- Downton Abbey (Series 4)
- Les Misérables
- Great Expectations
- Sherlock Holmes and Sherlock Holmes: A Game of Shadows
- Loki

In 2020, some scenes for Belgravia (TV series) were filmed at the dockyard.
