= The Old Bell Hotel, Derby =

Pub in Derby, Derbyshire, England

Coordinates: 52°55′24.01″N 1°28′39.68″W

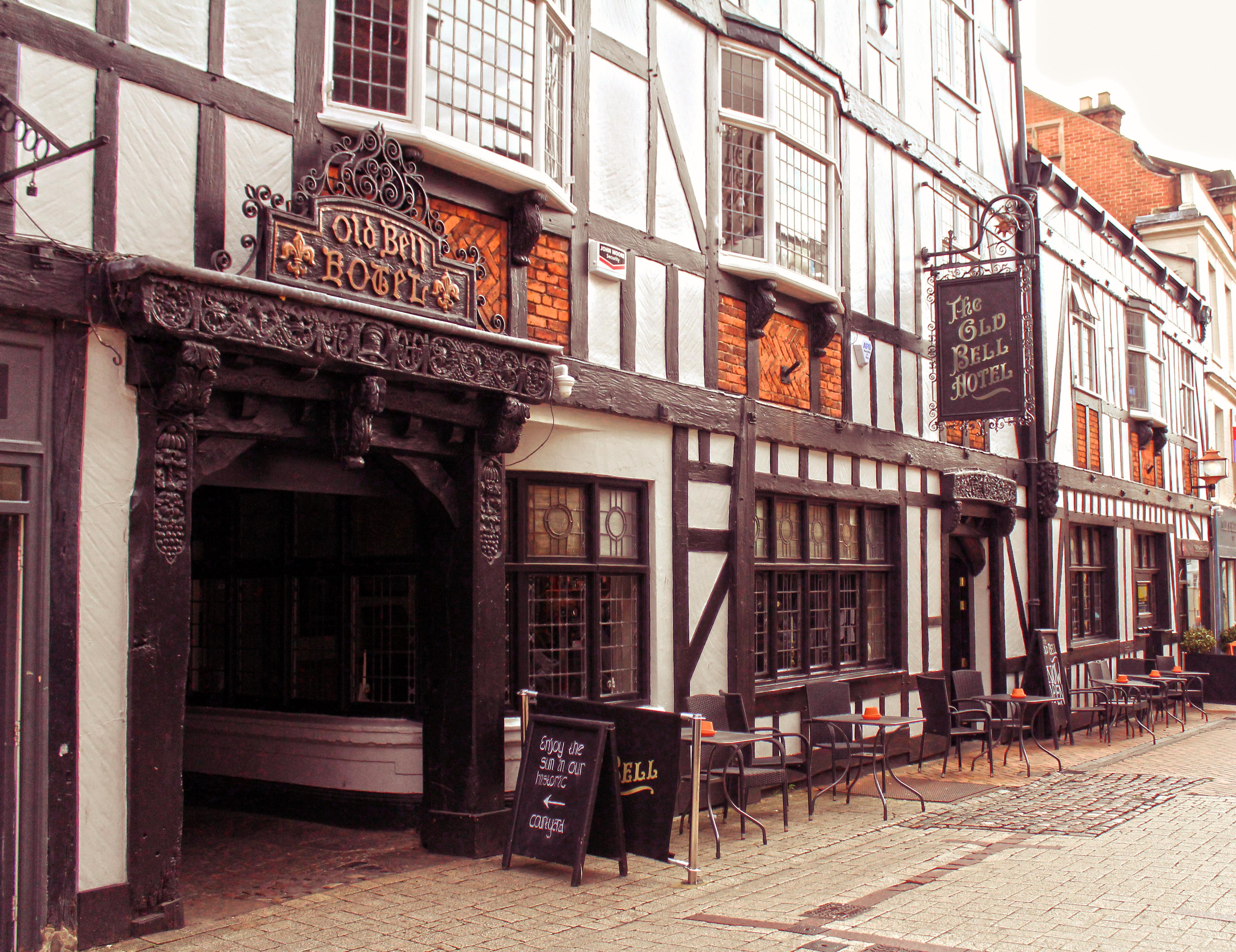
The Old Bell Hotel in Derby

The Old Bell Hotel in Derby, Derbyshire, United Kingdom, is one of Derby's oldest and largest coaching inns. It was built in 1650, in the historic street of Sadler Gate in the city's Cathedral Quarter. The hotel is a Grade II listed building and is included in the Derby City Statutory List of Buildings of Special Architecture or Historic Interest. Although much of the building has been altered and restored, most of the original structure can still be seen from the street, consisting of a timber-framed building of four storeys with four gables, each with one window, at the top. Over the years The Old Bell Hotel has served as a coaching inn, hotel, bar, restaurant, doctors' surgery, courtroom, jail and other functions.

== History ==
The Old Bell Hotel's history stretches over 350 years and the building has been heavily modified over the years as it has changed from a coaching inn, hotel, bar and restaurant. The coaching inns of England have played an important part in the social history of the country, being used as auction houses, meeting places for all manner of events, venues for concerts and evening medical surgeries, and The Old Bell Hotel was no different.

=== Sadler Gate ===
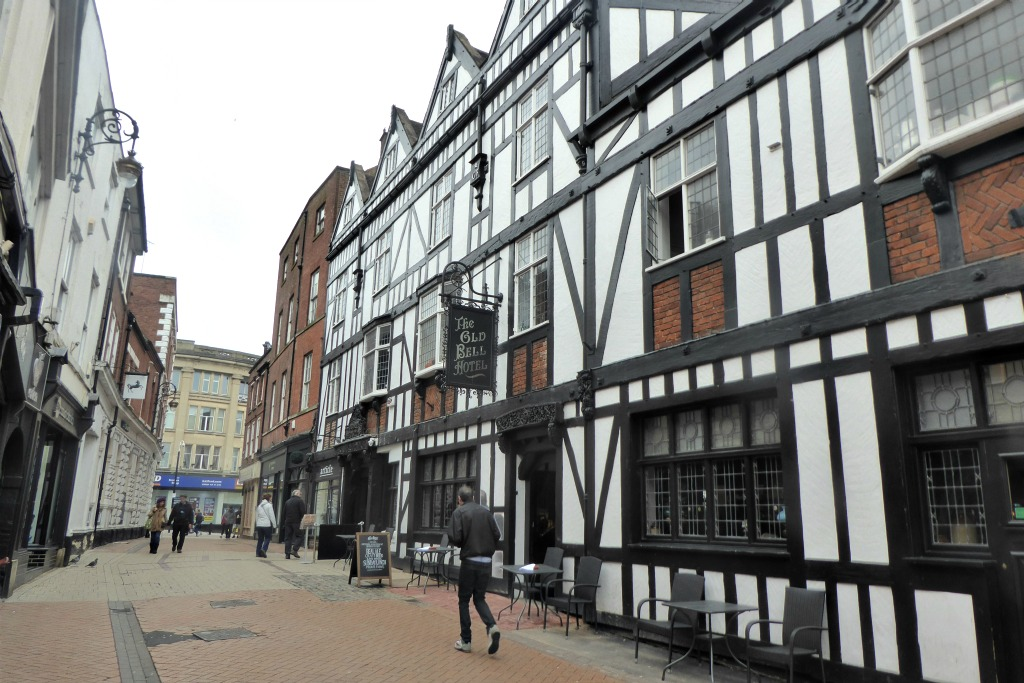
A view of The Old Bell Hotel on Sadler Gate

The Old Bell Hotel is on Sadler Gate, which itself has nearly 1000 years of history. The history of Sadler Gate stretches back to Derby's occupation by the Vikings where the street and surrounding area would probably have been quite recognisable to today's inhabitants. The name Sadler Gate gives evidence of trades already present in the town: gate was an Old Norse word for street and Sadler Gate was where the leather workers lived and traded. The houses and workshops that lined those roads would have been constructed of wood or stone with thatched or shingled roofs.

=== The Old Bell Coaching Inn ===
The majority of The Old Bell Hotel's history was as a coaching inn; such inns were a vital part of Europe's inland travel. The Old Bell Hotel was one of Derby's largest coaching inns and during its peak it had over 50 hotel rooms, several kitchens and meeting spaces, a network of connecting tunnels between other inns and was the home of Derby's incoming mail from around the world which it later shared with The George Inn.

=== Owners ===
The Old Bell Hotel has had many previous owners over the years, some of whom have kept the hotel in their family for decades, whereas others have owned it for just days. One of the longest owners was the Campion dynasty, who owned the building from July 1775 to 1863. Following the Campions' reign, the building was taken over by James Francis King, a well-known local Derby hotelier. King's reign at the Bell started in 1865 with a complimentary dinner, held in the assembly room of the Bell in front of 120 guests. The Mayor called King "a king of caterers" following the meal.

In 2013 The Old Bell Hotel was purchased by local businessman Paul Hurst who invested £1m on restoring the building to capture its original past; it reopened in July 2015.

=== Haunted history ===
The Old Bell Hotel has numerous ghost stories and tales from its 350-year history, and has featured on TV shows including Most Haunted. One story concerns a former maid at the inn named Mabel who was said to have hanged herself in her room after discovering she was pregnant. Another maid was said to have been attacked by one of Bonnie Prince Charlie's soldiers.

== Use ==
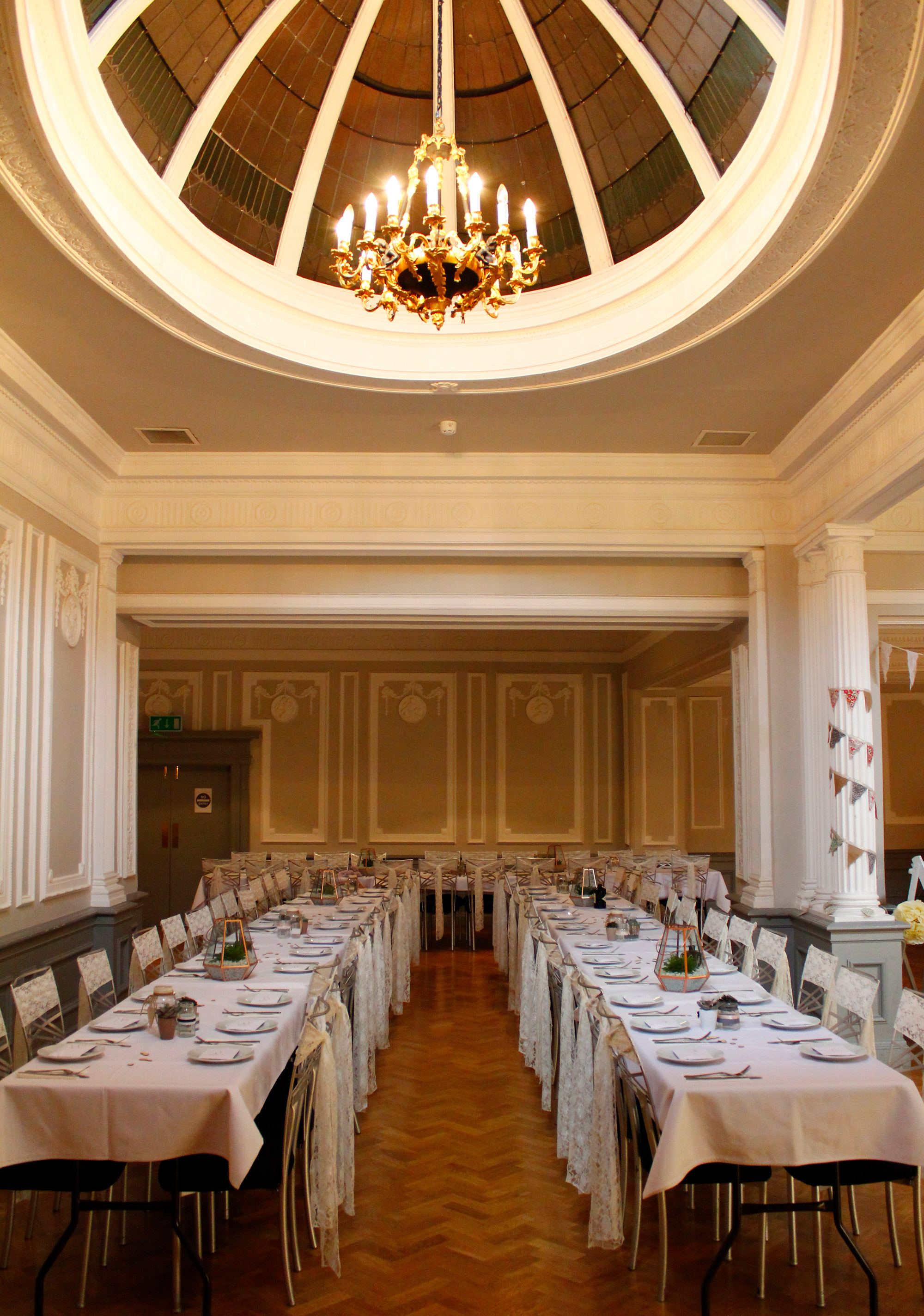
The Grand Regency Ballroom at The Old Bell Hotel after refurbishment

The Old Bell Hotel's primary use over the years was as a coaching inn, restaurant, bar and hotel. In 1969 The Old Bell Hotel was turned into a nightclub and the rest of the building remained derelict until 2013. Following its restoration in 2013–2015, some of the original spaces have been restored, such as the Tudor Bar, Tavern Bar, Grand Regency Ballroom and Belfry Bar. which are now used for live events and entertainment including weddings and conferences.
