= Schooner Hotel =

Coaching inn and hotel in Alnmouth, Northumberland, England

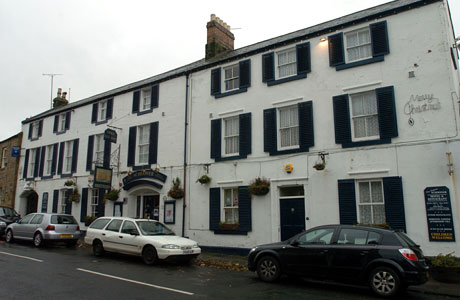

- Location within Northumberland

General information
- Location: 8 Northumberland Street, Alnmouth, Northumberland, England
- Coordinates: 55°23′14″N 1°36′44″W
- Inaugurated: 17th century

Website
- Official website

The Schooner Hotel & Bar is a Grade II listed 17th century coaching inn and hotel located at 8 Northumberland Street in the coastal village of Alnmouth, Northumberland, England. The hotel lies on the main High Street and is recognizable by its whitewashed walls and black painted shutters. In the 19th century the 32-room hotel had a considerable reputation with a clientele of people such as Charles Dickens, John Wesley, Basil Rathbone, and King George III of Great Britain.

The Schooner has been in decline for a number of years under the current owners, leading to unprecedented legal action by the Trading Standards department of the local county council.

== Architecture ==
The Schooner Hotel became a Grade II listed building on 31 December 1969. It is a whitewashed building with black shutters, originally built in the 17th century. It was extended in the early 19th century and again towards the end of the 19th century. It is built from tooled squared stone, three storeys high (excluding the cellar), and has 5 + 3 bays. The older section on the left has half-glazed doors with from the 20th century with an old segmental-headed arch at right end. The roof is made from Welsh slate roof, with 2 chimney stacks rebuilt in yellow brick. In the 2010s the rear portion of the hotel was renovated and turned into six separate properties; 3 apartments and 3 townhouses. The land behind the hotel that used to contain the Alnmouth Squash Courts is scheduled for further development into 7 houses. The first request for 8 houses was rejected due to insufficient information about contaminated land and archaeology. The second application was approved.

== Haunting ==
Sixty individual apparitions and more than 3,000 sightings have been recorded, making it (according to The Poltergeist Society of Great Britain) the most haunted hotel in the country.
