= Black Swan Hotel, Devizes =

1737 inn and hotel in Wiltshire, England

Black Swan Hotel
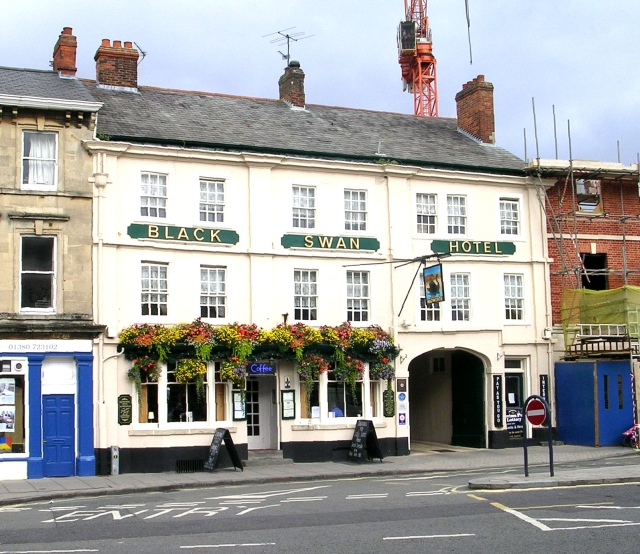
- Black Swan Hotel

- Location within Wiltshire

General information
- Location: Devizes, Wiltshire, England
- Coordinates: 51°21′11″N 1°59′45″W

Website
- www.blackswandevizes.co.uk

The Black Swan Hotel is a traditional inn and hotel in Devizes, Wiltshire, England. Overlooking the Market Place on the A360 road, the inn was built in 1737. It is associated with the nearby Wadworth Brewery. The inn is reputedly haunted; a young woman in a long dress is said to wander the corridors and walk through the walls. The building is Grade II* listed.

== See also ==
- Bear Hotel, Devizes, another historic coaching inn
