= Old Grammar School, Derby =

Building in Derby, England

Coordinates: 52.9204°N 1.4771°W

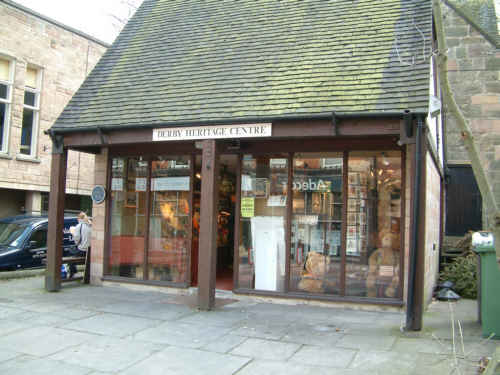
Photo showing the modern frontage of the building

The Old Grammar School, St. Peter's Churchyard, Derby, England, is now a Ladies Hairdressing Salon.

The building's new owner is the daughter of the architect responsible for the original restoration of this historical property. All of the original features of the building have been retained and further extensive restoration work has been carried out at the new owner's expense.

The Reverend John Cotton, a principal New England Puritan figure and a founder of Boston, Massachusetts, was educated at Derby School.

The Heritage Centre was established in 1992 by Richard Felix, long time historian on popular Living show Most Haunted and is the starting point for Derby Ghost Walks. The paranormal TV series Most Haunted completed an investigation at the Heritage Centre in 2003.
