= Station Hotel, Dudley =

Hotel in the West Midlands, England

Station Hotel
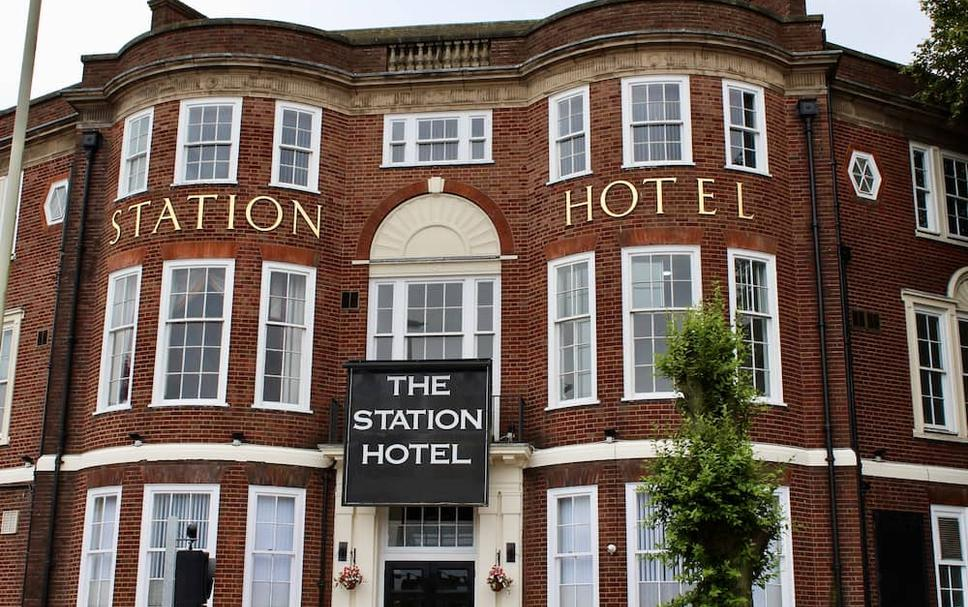
- The hotel in 2024

- Location within West Midlands county

General information
- Location: Castle Hill, Dudley, West Midlands, England
- Coordinates: 52°30′47.09″N 2°4′32.32″W
- Opened: 28 May 1898
- Renovated: 1910

Website
- www.stationhotelandbanqueting.com

The Station Hotel is a hotel and banqueting suite on Castle Hill in Dudley, a market town in the West Midlands, England. The original hotel was built and partially opened in 1898, with it opening fully to the public in 1910. It was then demolished and renovated as part of a modernisation plan in 1936.

== History ==
Dudley railway station opened in 1850 bringing visitors to Dudley. The high volume of visitors meant the local hotel, known as The Castle, could not cope with the number of new visitors to the town. In 1896, a meeting of town leaders was held and it was decided The Castle hotel would be demolished and replaced with a larger, more modern hotel.

The Station Hotel was partially opened on 28 May 1898 as a black and white building with a courtyard and a fountain situated out the front of the hotel. The fountain was moved down from the top of Castle Hill, making way for the Earl of Dudley statue. An entrance was built on the side of the hotel for horses and carriages. The hotel fully opened in 1910 and gained its name after the nearby Dudley railway station.

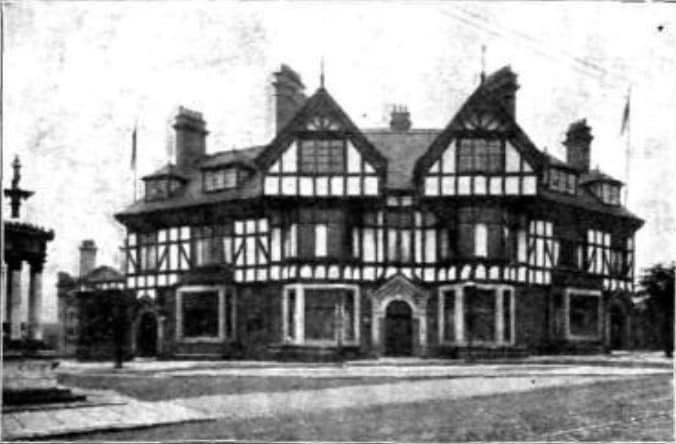
The original Station Hotel building

In 1936, the hotel was demolished and modernised to allow it to accommodate the guests and stars from the newly built Dudley Hippodrome that had opened the same year. During this time it was regarded as a modern hotel for the upper class of the era.

It was again modernised in the 1960s with a cocktail bar opening upstairs. A function room bar was also opened in the downstairs area of the hotel. At the time of opening, the function room bar was the longest in the United Kingdom.

== Famous guests ==
George Formby stayed at the hotel during his time performing at the nearby Dudley Hippodrome. He reportedly performed from the balcony of his suite to a large crowd outside who had gathered to get a glimpse of him while he was staying at the hotel.

Legendary comedians Stan Laurel and Oliver Hardy resided at the hotel while embarking on their theatre tour in May 1947.

Other famous guests that have stayed at the hotel include Bob Hope, Bing Crosby and Tommy Cooper following their appearances at Dudley Hippodrome.

== Ghosts ==
The Station Hotel is often regarded as the most haunted hotel in the West Midlands. Guest room 217 is rumoured to be haunted by an unnamed spirit. Guests staying in the room have reported to have left in fright, with many refusing to stay in the room due to the paranormal activity. The bed in room 217 has been known to shake and the lights within the room have switched themselves on and off. In 2003, Yvette Fielding and her team from the British television series Most Haunted visited the hotel with psychic Derek Acorah reporting the presence of multiple paranormal spirits.
