= Farnborough College of Technology =

College in Hampshire, England

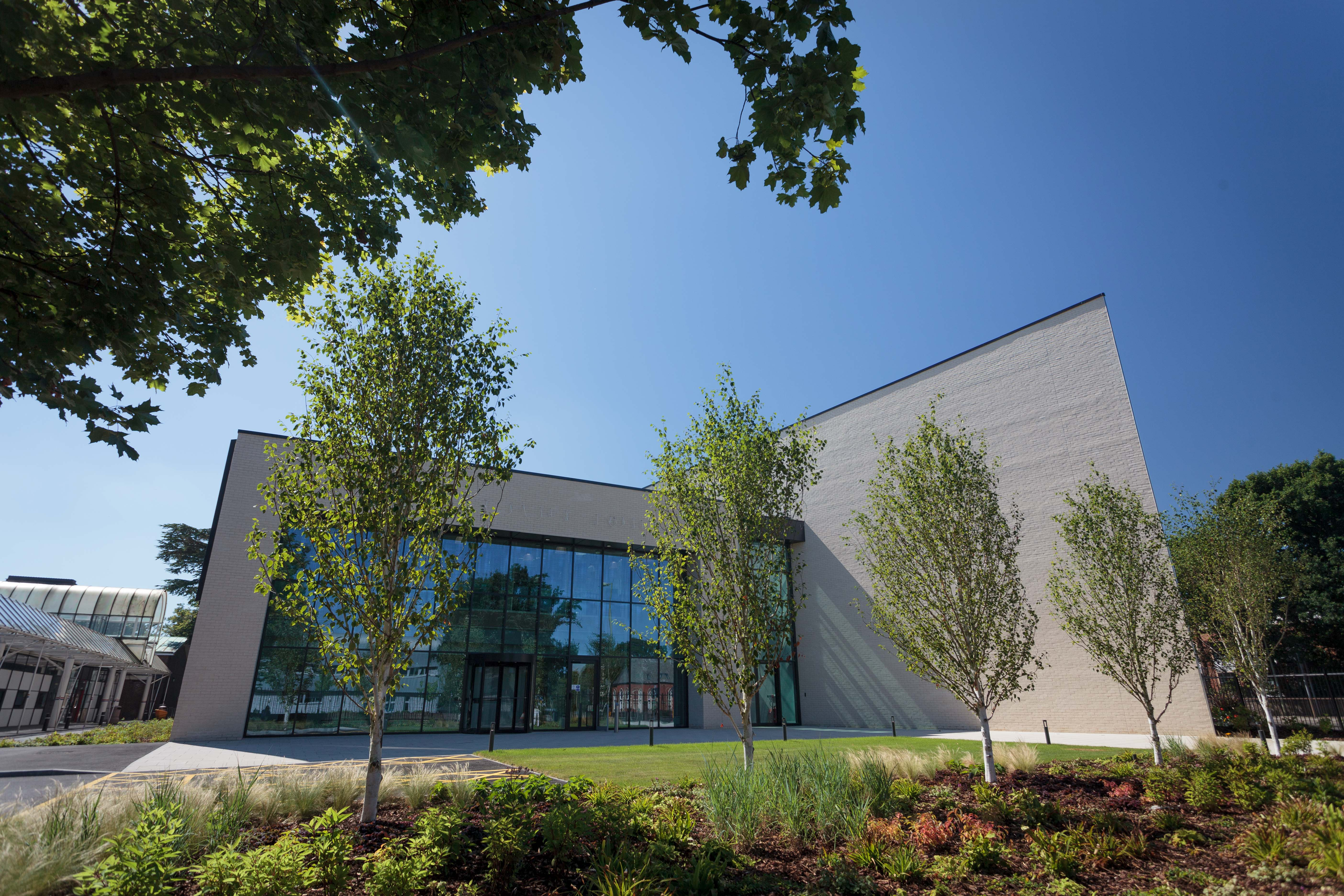
- Type: Public
- Established: 1957
- Academic affiliations: Aldershot College; University Centre Farnborough; University of Surrey
- Principal: Virginia Barrett
- Students: c. 8000
- Location: Farnborough, Hampshire, England; 51.2856°N 0.7490°W
- Campus: Urban
- Colours: Orange and Navy
- Website: www.farn-ct.ac.uk

Farnborough College of Technology is a college located in the town of Farnborough, Hampshire in the South East of England. Although primarily a further education college, Farnborough College of Technology also incorporates a university centre (University Centre Farnborough), which offers a range of higher education courses accredited by the University of Surrey.

Farnborough College of Technology has a second campus located in the contiguous town of Aldershot, Hampshire in the South East of England, known as Aldershot College.

In 2011, Farnborough College of Technology was rated 'Outstanding' by Ofsted.

== History ==
1.1 Farnborough College of Technology

The roots of the college date back to 1913, when the War Office authorised classes to be held at the Royal Aircraft Factory, based at Farnborough Airfield. In 1944 this became an independent technical school known as the Royal Aircraft Establishment's Technical College. In 1957, a separate college known as Farnborough Tech was established on an adjacent area of land. In 1960, the RAE Technical School merged with Farnborough Tech to form Farnborough College of Technology.

In 1967, engineering students from the college staged an elaborate hoax by placing six model flying saucers across southern England as a rag week stunt. The emergency and military services took them seriously for some hours. The hoax was only made public by The National Archives in 2011.

Today, Farnborough College of Technology offers a range of qualification levels, including:

- Access to Higher Education
- A Levels
- T Levels
- Apprenticeships
- BTEC
- Professional Courses (NVQ, CIPD, CIM, PGCE)

1.2 Aldershot College

In 2005, Farnborough College of Technology purchased a site in Aldershot, Hampshire and Aldershot College was formed. Aldershot College specialises in construction courses and offers further and higher education courses, and apprenticeships.

1.3 University Centre Farnborough

In 2013, the University Centre Farnborough was launched, offering University of Surrey accredited degrees from the Farnborough College of Technology main campus.

The college constructed a University Centre building on the main campus in 2016. The building is home to a library, study areas, and a Starbucks franchise which was officially opened by the Duke of Kent in November 2017.

University Centre Farnborough offers foundation degrees, undergraduate degrees, including two-year fast-track degrees, and top-up degrees.

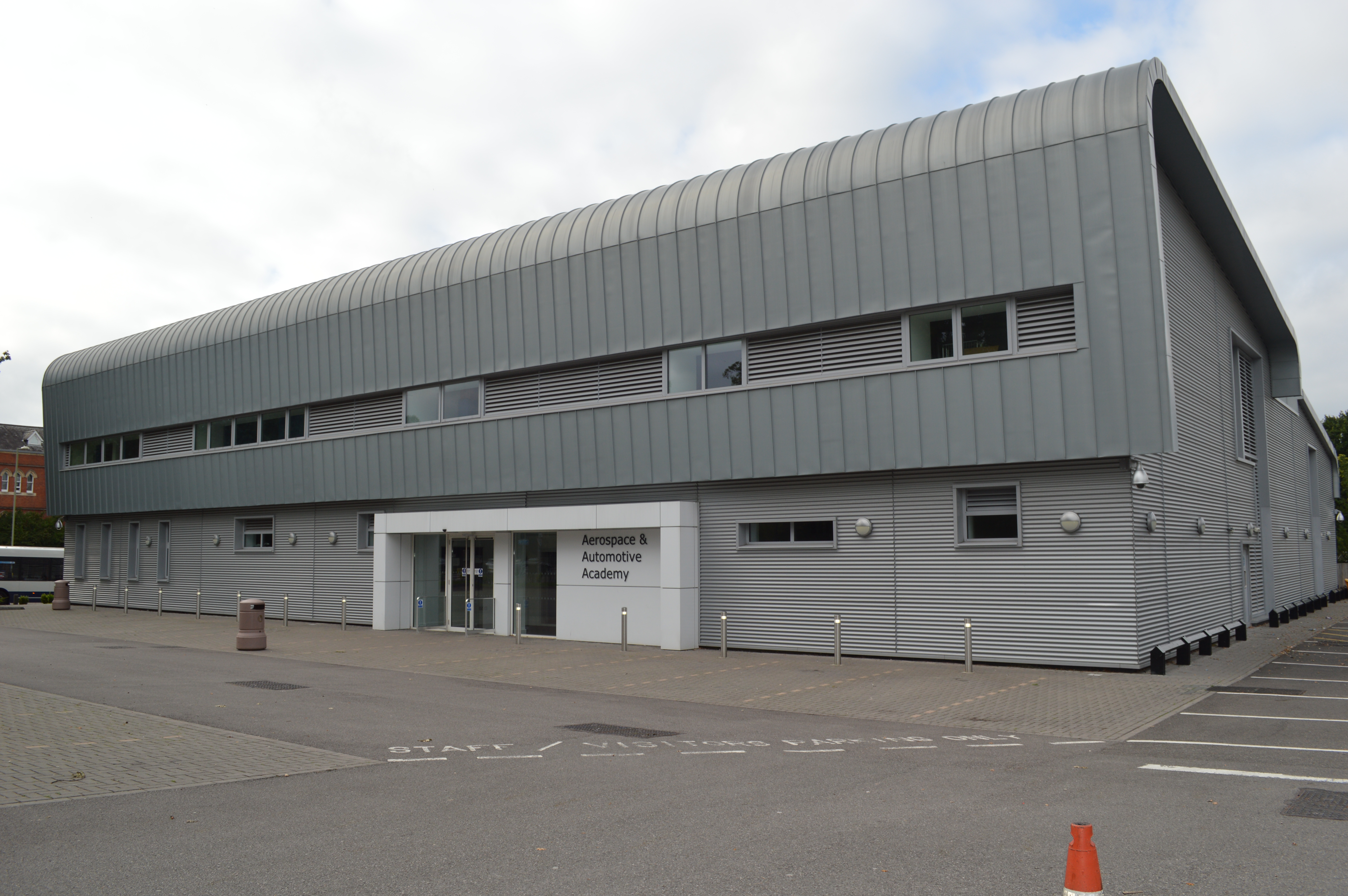
Farnborough College of Technology's Aerospace and Automotive Academy

== Facilities ==
The main campus is at Boundary Road, Farnborough and provides vocational training and education. Specialist teaching facilities include The Gallery Restaurant, The Hair and Beauty Academy salon, Beyond Fitness Gym, The Aerospace and Automotive Academy, a performance theatre, a floristry studio, a photography studio and dark room, a multi-camera television studio, and two radio studios. The salon, restaurant and floristry studio operate commercially and are open to the public.

The college radio studios are used for 26 days in March each year to broadcast FCOT FM 87.7, the college's commercial radio station which operates under a restricted service licence.

The main campus also has an on-site Ofsted-registered nursery (Bookworms Nursery), which provides childcare for the children of students, staff and local families.

== Structure ==
The academic activities of the college are divided into five academic faculties:

- Academic Studies
- Engineering, Construction and Commercial Service
- Enterprise, Creative and Sport
- Preparation for Work and Life Skills
- Higher Education

== Notable alumni ==
Former students of the college include Former NBA player Joel Freeland and musician Mike Rutherford of the bands Genesis and Mike + The Mechanics, as well as Diane Youdale and Mark Griffin who appeared in the British television series Gladiators as Jet and Trojan respectively. DJ Annie Mac earned a Master's Degree in Radio at FCOT, before going on to have her own show on BBC Radio 1. In an interview, she referred to her time at Farnborough as "the biggest culture-shock [she'd] ever experienced in [her] life". Musician and author Alan Clayson studied at FCOT from 1968 to 1970.

Three members of The Football Ramble, the largest independent podcast in the UK studied at the college. Luke Moore, Marcus Speller and Jim Campbell all met at FCOT and studied there between 2000 and 2003. Moore and Speller both featured on the college radio station, co-hosting the Saturday Sports Show.

David Wells is most famous for working as a medium for the British paranormal investigation TV programme Most Haunted. Wells studied at FCOT, undertaking an HND in Leisure and Tourism. In Series 5 of Most Haunted Live! Access All Areas, Wells mentions he did a piece on both the Kings Theatre in Southsea, and on the New Theatre Royal in Portsmouth, as part of his HND at FCOT.
