= Gordon Smith (psychic medium) =

British medium, born 1962

- Born: 6 July 1962 (age 63); Gorbals, Glasgow, U.K.
- Known for: Work as medium on Most Haunted

Gordon Smith (born 6 July 1962) is a British psychic medium; known as the UK's "most accurate" medium.

== Career as a medium ==
Gordon Smith's career as a medium began at the age of 24, when another medium told him that one day he would be 'on the platform'. This was the start of a 15-year-long study to be a medium.

As he used to work as a barber, he is often known (and used to present himself as) The Psychic Barber.

He works giving demonstrations, writing books and organising workshops, and until March 2008 wrote a psychic column for the British tabloid The Sunday People. Smith does not charge for readings.

Smith was studied by Professor Archie Roy in a series of experiments to determine his possible psychic abilities, the results of which were published in the Journal of the Society for Psychical Research.

== Television and film ==
He was featured in the BBC Everyman (TV series) series and in another BBC documentary, Talking to the Dead in 2003. He has also appeared on Richard & Judy, discussing mediumship.

In October 2005, Smith was revealed as the new medium on Living TV's Most Haunted, taking over from Derek Acorah. He appeared in Series 7 and three episodes of Series 8 before being replaced by David Wells.

In 2008, Smith appeared in a special "Paranormal Edition" episode of The Weakest Link, in which he made it to the final round but lost to Mia Dolan. In 2008–09, he presented his own series 'Psychic Therapy' on the Biography Channel.

Smith appeared in the film adaptation of Jackie Collins' book, Paris Connections, appearing alongside Charles Dance and Trudie Styler.

Smith has appeared on the television show This Morning, along with the skeptic and psychologist, Chris French, discussing possible psi phenomena. Both men carried out a 'reading' of two blind-folded women and then later compared their results with the women and the show's presenters.

== Bibliography ==
- Inner Visions: A Medium's Life, Pembridge Publishing, 2000. ISBN 978-0-95348-161-3.
- Spirit Messenger: The Remarkable Story of a Seventh Son of Seventh Son, Hay House, 2003. ISBN 978-1-84850-000-6.
- The Unbelievable Truth, Hay House, 2004. ISBN 978-1-40190-549-1.
- Stories from the Other Side, Hay House, 2006. ISBN 978-1-4019-1172-0.
- Through My Eyes, Hay House, 2006. ISBN 978-1-40191-525-4.
- Life Changing Messages: Remarkable Stories From The Other Side, Hay House, 2007. ISBN 978-1-40191-567-4.
- The Amazing Power of Animals, Hay House, 2008. ISBN 978-1-84850-008-2. (Later published in 2018 as Animal Magic: The Extraordinary Proof of our Pets' Intuition ISBN 1788170636).
- Developing Mediumship, Hay House, 2009. ISBN 978-1-84850-069-3.
- Why Do Bad Things Happen?, Hay House, 2009. ISBN 978-1-84850-102-7.
- Intuitive Studies: A Complete Course in Mediumship, Hay House, 2012. ISBN 978-1-84850-836-1.
- Positive Vibes: Inspiring Thoughts for Change and Transformation, Hay House, 2013. ISBN 978-1-78180-106-2.
- Best of Both Worlds, Coronet, 2014. ISBN 978-1-444-79083-2.
- One Hundred Answers from Spirit, Coronet, 2016. ISBN 978-1-444-79087-0.
- A Thin Place: Where Two Worlds Meet, (Children's Fiction), Cone House Publishing Limited, 2016. ISBN 978-0-993-58181-6.
- Beyond Reasonable Doubt: The Case for Supernatural Phenomena in the Modern World, Coronet, 2018. ISBN 978-1-444-79092-4.
