= Ghosthunting With... =

British reality television programme

- Directed by: Karl Beattie
- Starring: Yvette Fielding; Professor Geoffrey Beattie; John Thomson
- Country of origin: United Kingdom
- No. of episodes: 12

Production
- Producer: Antix Productions
- Cinematography: Chris Burton
- Running time: 120 mins (inc. adverts)

Original release
- Network: ITV2
- Release: 2 December 2006 – 14 September 2011

Related
- Most Haunted (2002–)

Ghosthunting With... is a British paranormal reality television programme based on investigating purported paranormal activity. Yvette Fielding hosts the programme, broadcast on digital channel ITV2 between 2006 and 2011, where she takes celebrities to haunted buildings to investigate.

== 2006 ==
=== Girls Aloud ===
First broadcast: 12 December 2006

Only four of the five members of Girls Aloud took part in the pilot episode of the show, which was set in North Wales. Nadine Coyle opted out of the show because she was too scared. This left Nicola Roberts, Kimberley Walsh, Cheryl Cole and Sarah Harding to go ghost hunting.

Plas Teg: Yvette gives the girls a tour of the house, where she speaks out. They hear knocking noises throughout the house. They then decide to have a séance. Nicola then leaves the group and retreats to the taxi and psychologist Professor Geoffrey Beattie. During the séance, objects are thrown around the room, supposedly by a squire who used to work at the house. Cheryl feels something touch her arm just before the séance. After the séance, the group split up to find more ghosts. Cheryl and Kimberley go downstairs, while Sarah and Yvette stay upstairs. When Cheryl and Kimberley return, Cheryl's finger is flicked, presumably by the ghost.

Crossley Hospital: The next site the girls visit is Crossley Hospital an abandoned sanatorium. The hospital itself is derelict, but there are many out-houses which the girls enter, such as the morgue and the nurses' quarters. In the morgue, Yvette decides to play with the Ouija board. Nicola opts out, but stays to watch. But while touring the morgue, she reaches the end of her nerve and leaves the group again. She is soon followed by Sarah. The remainder of the group, accompanied by security, continue their expedition to the basement. Sarah decides to rejoin the group at this point. While in the basement, the group has stones thrown at them. Cheryl, Kimberley and Sarah decide to call it a night and depart for the safety of the taxi and Geoff. But Yvette stays to face the spirit. But the longer she stays, the more stones get thrown at her so she decides to leave.

== 2007 ==
=== The Dingles (Emmerdale) ===
First broadcast: 18 September 2007

In this episode Yvette takes Lucy Pargeter (Chas Dingle), Verity Rushworth (Donna Windsor), Hayley Tamaddon (Del Dingle), Joe Gilgun (Eli Dingle) and Mark Charnock (Marlon Dingle), to three of the reputedly most haunted locations in York, including the National Railway Museum.

=== McFly ===
First broadcast: 23 October 2007

For this episode, Yvette takes the McFly band into the Northumbrian countryside to visit three different locations. While the four band members were in high spirits for the tours of the locations, their personalities change completely upon switching to night-vision.

Underground mine Yvette takes the band underground to explore a dark and damp mine; all five were required to wear hats and welly boots in order to pass through the mines. The first person to be scared is Dougie, who loses his hat, runs into the wall and cuts his lip upon being startled. Knocks are heard almost frequently whenever Yvette called out, and after a while suggests the group split up to explore the two different tunnels. Upon arriving at the end of their tunnel, Tom and Harry play a prank on Yvette, Dougie and Danny by knocking when she attempts to call out. However, their prank is apparently mimicked by an unseen entity, and the five decide to move on upon Harrys instructions to "leg it".

Forest & cottage Yvette takes the boys to a forest, where a cottage, formerly used for keeping male slaves in cramped conditions, also resides. During a séance, Yvette and McFly make contact with a male spirit who throws a stone around the room. Next, Yvette prepares a challenge for the four of them; she assigns Tom and Dougie to one tent in the forest, and Harry to another. Danny, however, is told to remain in the cottage; after 15 minutes, Yvette blows a whistle as a sign for the boys to return to her. Danny gets freaked out when he hears knocking, Harry becomes too scared to do anything, and Tom and Dougie become distracted with a game to hide their fear; the two later admit to having felt like something was touching them during the challenge.

13th century castle For the last part of the night, Yvette takes the band to a castle, where paranormal activity is said to be frequent. Harry even tries calling out to one of the spirits himself. After taking them on a tour around the castle, including an old smoking room (now a bedroom), a bathroom and a few old dungeons, Yvette begins her final challenge. She gives the boys a choice to stay in a haunted room for as long as they can handle, or wait outside in the taxi. Tom and Dougie are the only two to refrain from staying in their rooms. Danny stays in the dungeon, lasting a fair few minutes before being let out, while Harry is sent to the old smoking room, where he agrees to stay for only five minutes with security outside the room.

=== Radio 1 ===
First broadcast: 3 December 2007

BBC Radio 1 DJ's Scott Mills, Comedy Dave, Rachel Jones & Aled Haydn Jones, travelled to a Napoleonic fortress (which included a labyrinth maze of tunnels below ground), a guard house near to the fortress (said to be home to the spirits of three soldiers), Eastbury Manor (built upon the former site of Barking Abbey founded in 666) and their final destination of the night was the Caponier tunnels.

== 2008 ==
=== Coronation Street ===
First broadcast: 18 February 2008

Tupele Dorgu (Kelly Crabtree), Jack P. Shepherd (David Platt), Katherine Kelly (Becky Granger), Kym Ryder (Michelle Connor) and former Weatherfield actress Wendi Peters (Cilla Battersby-Brown) followed Yvette and the ghost-hunting team to three locations on the Isle of Man.

The cast carried out a séance in the auditorium of the Gaiety Theatre where a lady in black allegedly resides, before moving on to the 16th Century Milntown House where the Christian family claims mysterious figures roam the corridors. Their final stop is one of the Isle's ancient watermills.

=== I'm a Celebrity... ===
First broadcast: 26 March 2008

Yvette Fielding takes I'm a Celebrity winners Matt Willis and Christopher Biggins, as well as former contestants Dean Gaffney and Cerys Matthews and ITV2 spinoff show presenter Emma Griffiths to an abandoned hospital and The Black Country Living Museum in the West Midlands.

=== Paul O'Grady and Friends ===
First broadcast: 4 September 2008

Originally stated as Ghost Hunting With... Paul O'Grady and Friends, Paul O'Grady, Jennifer Ellison, Philip Olivier and Natasha Hamilton jet off to Italy to join Yvette Fielding as she investigates some of the most scariest and sinister locations Sicily has to offer. Yvette appeared on the Paul O'Grady Show in April 2008, where she explained with Paul, their experiences whilst filming for the show, during which Yvette and Paul both hinted the episode may be used as a Christmas Special. In the episode, the team visit Carini Castle, an Opera House, and try to connect with a two-year-old who was entombed in the Capuchin Catacombs in 1920.

During the 2007 Most Haunted Live from Transylvania, in an interview, Yvette Fielding explained that Paul O'Grady had originally been lined up to take part in a Most Haunted celebrity special. This came after he took part in the Most Haunted Live in London during 2005. However, before filming could commence (which was scheduled for the end of 2006), Paul fell ill. Living TV decided to go ahead with the commission, with the exception of turning the recorded programme into a Live show. In 2007, plans were made for Paul to take part in Ghost Hunting With..., fulfilling Yvette's ambition of taking him on a full-length ghost hunt.

== 2009 ==
=== Louis Walsh and Boyzone ===
First broadcast: 29 August 2009

Yvette Fielding takes pop supremo Louis Walsh and Boyzone on a trip into the unknown as they brave the shadows underneath the historic city of Edinburgh. Below the city is a terrifying network of subterranean streets once occupied by criminals and the underclasses, named after the former street, Mary King's Close. Yvette will lead Louis and the boys to a hell on three levels as they descend through the forgotten streets to investigate a witches' lair and chambers believed to be haunted by evil ghosts. But will the lads make it that far?. This episode marked the last TV appearance of Stephen Gately as he died 6 weeks later on 10 October 2009.

=== The Happy Mondays ===
First broadcast: 12 September 2009

Yvette Fielding takes Manchester band Happy Mondays on a journey to the dark side in Lincoln and Nottingham's scariest locations. She introduces them to ghosthunting techniques and secrets, before challenging them to spend a lonely night with only ghosts for company. Will the Mondays' reputation for hell-raising help rouse the dead?

== 2010 ==
=== Katie, Alex and Friends ===
First broadcast: 21 August 2010

In the first show of 2010,Yvette Fielding took Katie Price, new husband Alex Reid, brother Danny and close friends Gary Cockerill and Phil Turner to spend the night on the Great Tew estate in rural Oxfordshire.

=== The Saturdays ===
First Broadcast: 8 November 2010

Yvette takes on, The Saturdays to three haunted sites in Wales.

The girls visit three equally terrifying locations, nestled within the Welsh mountains; the clock tower, the manor and the kitchen block. In each of these areas there have been countless reports of strange sightings, the sounds of chatter coming from empty rooms, cooking smells coming from an empty kitchen, and reported ghostly sightings. During the time in the first location, Rochelle Wiseman said she felt someone touch her leg and someone blowing onto her neck.

The second ghostly hot spot is the eerie clock tower, which was constructed using beams taken from an ill-fated ship. The tower is rumoured to be haunted by a restless spirit of a suicide victim and anyone who enters is confronted by his hostile presence.

The final destination of the evening is the manor. The girls will visit the foreboding first floor landing which has been noted as having the most paranormal activity in the building. Next up is the surgery room which was used by the Red Cross for injured soldiers during the first world war and finally the attic where the tormented spirit is said to sway back and forth in an old rocking chair. Strangely, it is said that female entertainers who would perform at the Manor for the former owner complained of being harassed by an evil presence.

== 2011 ==
=== The Only Way Is Essex ===
First broadcast: 14 September 2011

It was announced on 31 August 2011 that some of the cast of The Only Way Is Essex would join Yvette Fielding in a revived version of the series exploring Essex's Coalhouse Fort. Joining Yvette were Harry Derbidge, Sam Faiers, Joey Essex, Amy Childs, Mark Wright and James Argent.

== Ratings ==
Episode ratings are taken from BARB.

| Episode no. | Air date | Viewers | ITV2 weekly ranking |
|---|---|---|---|
| 1 | 12 December 2006 | 800,000 | 3 |
| 2 | 18 September 2007 | 464,000 | 7 |
| 3 | 23 October 2007 | N/A | Outside Top 10 |
| 4 | 3 December 2007 | 794,000 | 5 |
| 5 | 18 February 2008 | 1,336,000 | 1 |
| 6 | 26 March 2008 | N/A | Outside Top 10 |
| 7 | 4 September 2008 | 541,000 | 9 |
| 8 | 29 August 2009 | N/A | Outside Top 10 |
| 9 | 12 September 2009 | N/A | Outside Top 10 |
| 10 | 21 August 2010 | 629,000 | 7 |
| 11 | 8 November 2010 | N/A | Outside Top 10 |
| 12 | 14 September 2011 | 593,000 | 7 |
