= Stuart Torevell =

British television camera operator

Stuart "Stu" Torevell
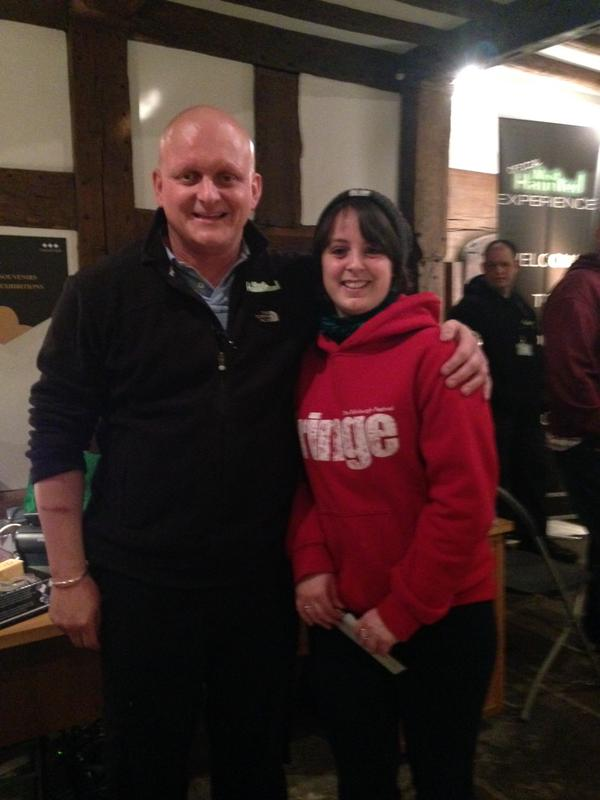
- Torevell at a Most Haunted Experience event
- Born: 1 April 1974 (age 51); Stockport, Greater Manchester, England, U.K.
- Occupation(s): Cameraman, Paranormal Investigator
- Known for: Most Haunted; Most Haunted Live!
- Relatives: Yvette Fielding (cousin)
- Website: https://twitter.com/StuartTorevell

Stuart Torevell (born 1 April 1974 in Stockport, Greater Manchester) is a camera operator and rigger working for television production company Antix Productions on shows such as Most Haunted. He is a cousin of Yvette Fielding.

Torevell is mostly known for his on-camera role as a paranormal investigator on Most Haunted and Most Haunted Live! He has been a member of the program since the show started in 2002.

He has alopecia, a condition that caused him to lose his hair. Torevell attributes his condition to a terrifying attack by a supernatural force at the Ancient Ram Inn. Torevell has also been trapped in a room in another location causing him extreme panic and fear.
