= Seaview (TV series) =

- Written by: Chris Barlas
- Starring: Yvette Fielding; Aaron Brown
- Country of origin: United Kingdom
- No. of series: 2
- No. of episodes: 12

Original release
- Release: 1983 – 1985

Seaview is a British children's television series produced by the BBC in 1983.

Written by Chris Barlas, the series was a light-hearted comedy drama centred on a teenage girl, Sandy Shelton (played by future Blue Peter and Most Haunted presenter Yvette Fielding), and her younger brother George (Aaron Brown) growing up living at their parents' guest house in Blackpool. Two series each consisting of six episodes were made between 1983 and 1985. The second series introduced a boyfriend for Sandy played by Mark Jordon, who went on to star as PC Phil Bellamy in ITV's Heartbeat.
