= Lesley Smith (historian) =

British historian

- Born: 14 June 1957 (age 69); London, England
- Known for: Curator of Tutbury Castle

Lesley Smith (M.Univ, M.Phil, FSA Scot, M.S.M.W; born 14 June 1957 in London) is an English scholar, historian, heritage publicist and actress. She is the curator of Tutbury Castle and is perhaps best known for her performances on stage as historical figures such as Mary, Queen of Scots and Elizabeth I. She has also been featured in a number of television programmes.

== Curator ==
Smith is the curator and lessee of Tutbury Castle, a position granted by the Duchy of Lancaster, for which she works as Public Relations Officer. Between 2000 (when she took up the position) and 2006, Smith presided over a 12-fold increase in visitor numbers. To reward her achievements, in 2006 the University of Derby awarded Smith an honorary master's degree. At the conferment of the degree, she was described as "a remarkable social historian of the 16th century who is passionate about and committed to raising public understanding of the subject."

== Dramatist ==
Smith is known for her dramatic interpretations of Queen Elizabeth I and Mary, Queen of Scots, for which she dons authentic replica costumes. She performs regular ghost hunt evenings, in character, at Tutbury. She also takes these re-enactments, as well as those of Nell Gwyn and Anne Boleyn, to theatrical and charitable venues.

== Scholar ==
Smith is a member of the Association of Medical Writers and is currently completing her PhD in "obstetrics and gynaecology in early modern Britain", working in conjunction with University of Birmingham and the British Museum. She has lectured there on her discoveries relating to 16th century contraception, such as the use of leather condoms, and citrus fruit as cervical caps. Smith is also a regular contributor to the Journal of the Royal College of Obstetricians and Gynaecologists, and has delivered lectures to groups such as the Royal Institute of Chemists, Royal Society of Medicine and the Scottish Parliament at the Royal Society of Edinburgh.

== Personal life ==
Lesley Smith was entirely convent educated before university, and although described as, "causing quite a stir" by one of the teaching nuns, she claims to have loved school.

When aged 35, she modelled for a realist statue of the Immaculate Conception created by sculptor Mark Delph in 1992. The 12-foot bronze statue can be now seen at the Church of the Immaculate Conception at Bicester, Oxfordshire.

Smith is married to Viking specialist authority Dr. Gareth Williams, and has one son, Henry, by her late husband, who was a notary public.

== Media appearances ==
- Our Hospital Through Time Channel 5
- Rich Times/Poor Times, Channel 5
- This is MY house, BBC (2022)
- The Final Days of Mary Queen of Scots, Channel 5 (2015)
- The Hour, STV (2011)
- The One Show, BBC (2011)
- Most Haunted: Midsummer Murders, LivingTV (2007)
- Most Haunted, LivingTV (2002, 2006–2009, 2010)
- The Worst Jobs in History, Channel 4 (2004)
- The World's Biggest Ghost Hunt, LivingTV (2003)
- Predictions, Granada Breeze (2001)

Smith has also participated in radio interviews for the BBC, and local radio in the Derby area.
