= David Wells (medium) =

Scottish medium and astrologer

- Born: 8 June 1960 (age 65); Kelloholm, Scotland, U.K.
- Known for: Work as medium on Most Haunted

David Wells (born 8 June 1960) is a Scottish medium and astrologer. He has been featured as the main medium on Living TV's paranormal documentary series Most Haunted as well as its spin-off Most Haunted Live!.

== Early life ==
Wells was born in Kelloholm, Scotland. Before working as a medium, he served in the Royal Navy. Wells states that he discovered his abilities after suffering from pneumonia, learning astrology and studying the Qabalah to "ground" his abilities.

== Television and media ==
Wells has appeared on Jane Goldman Investigates and Psychic Interactive. He serves as the official astrologer for NOW, the Scottish Daily Record and Spirit and Destiny Magazine. He was the astrologer for the Metro newspaper and the main astrologer for the Daily Mirror.

=== Most Haunted ===
Wells was a guest medium on Most Haunted in 2004, during the episode filmed at the Greengate Brewery, along with the then resident medium Derek Acorah and London's resident parapsychologist Matthew Smith. He then took over Acorah's position on the show.
