= Houska Castle =

Gothic castle in the Czech Republic

Coordinates: 50.491°N 14.624°E

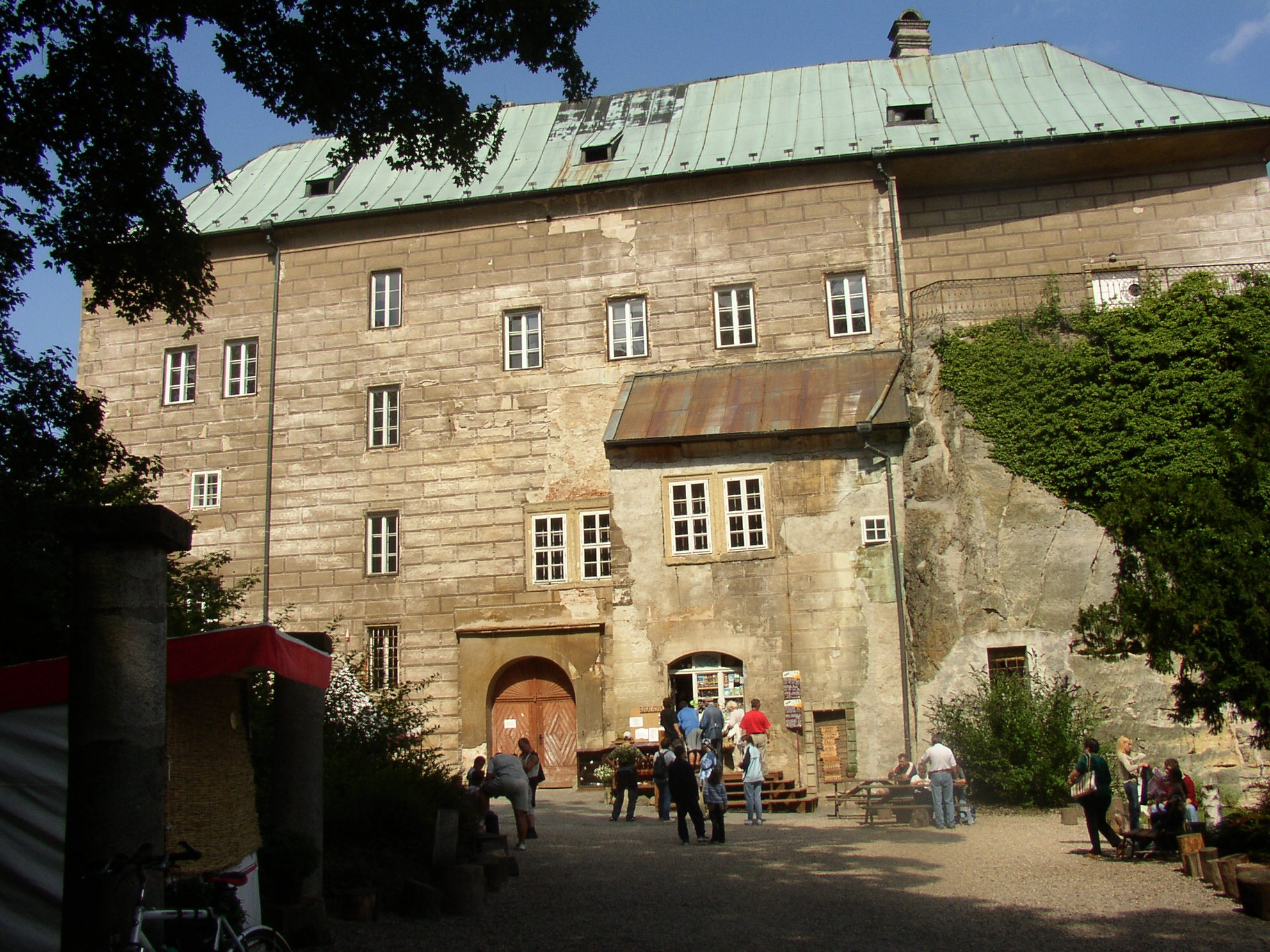
Entrance gate in detail

Houska Castle (Czech: Hrad Houska) is an early Gothic castle in the municipality of Blatce in the Liberec Region of the Czech Republic. It lies about 47 km (29 mi) north of Prague. It is one of the best preserved castles of the period. Some notable features of the castle include a predominantly Gothic chapel, a green chamber with late-Gothic paintings, and a knight's drawing room. The castle is a protected cultural monument open to the public during visiting hours.

Folklore considers this castle to cover one of the gateways to Hell, built to prevent demons (trapped in lower levels) from reaching the rest of the world.

== History ==
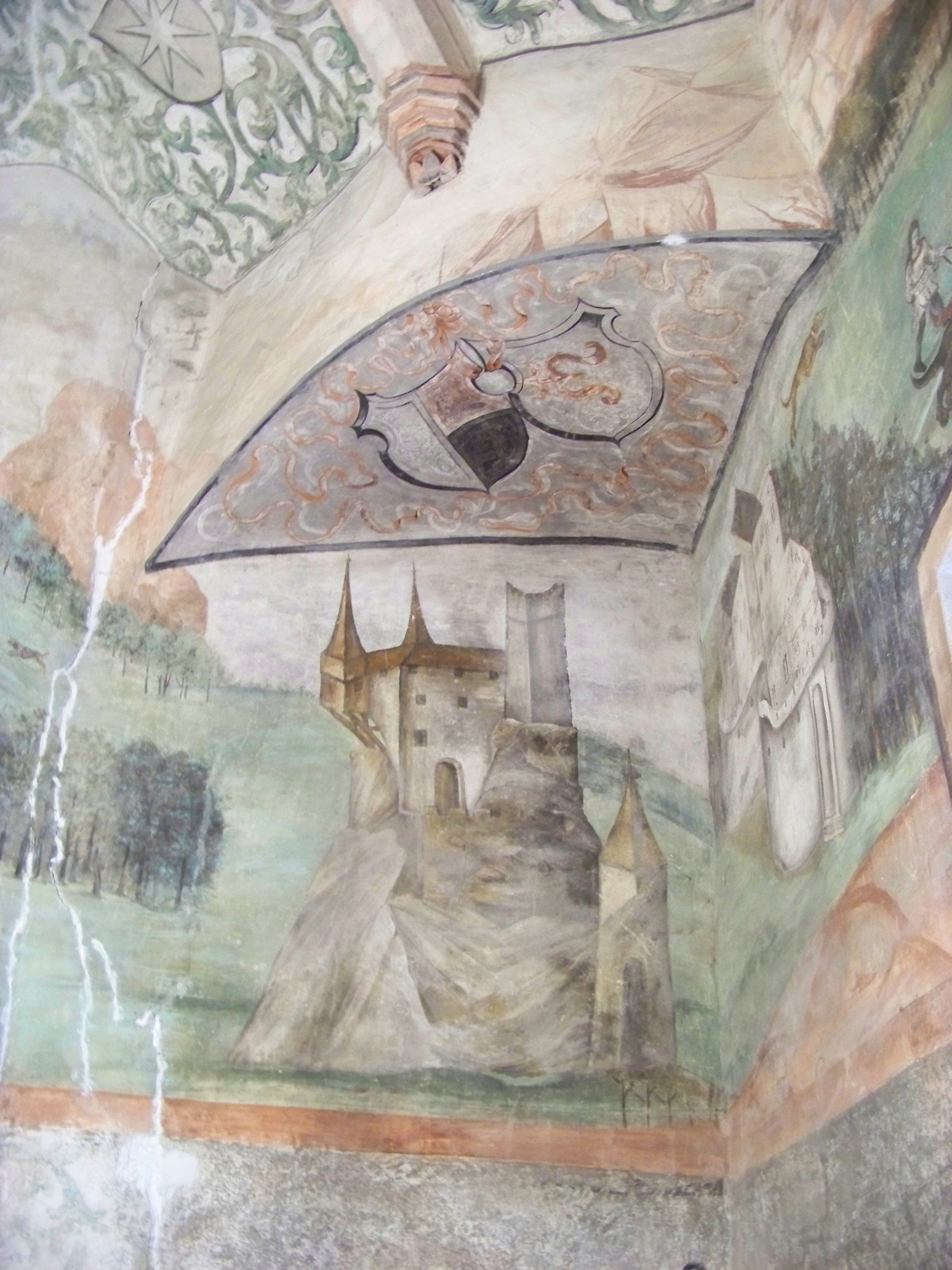
A depiction of the Renaissance form of Houska Castle with the coat of arms of the Hrzán family from Harasov

Houska Castle was founded on royal land in the 13th century, likely during the reign of Ottokar II of Bohemia (1253-1278). Its precise founder and date of construction have been the subject of different interpretations. Some historians believed the lords of Dubá built the castle and dated its construction to around 1280-1305, but later architectural studies identified architectural features dating to the 1260s and 1270s and strong similarities with the nearby royal castle of Bezděz. These findings support its establishment as a royal castle under Ottokar II. The first known written mention of Houska dates from 1316, when Hynáček of the lords of Dubá was recorded as “of Houska.”

Later on, it passed to the hands of the aristocracy, frequently passing from the ownership of one to another in the family. The castle was built in an area of forests, swamps and mountains with no source of water except for a cistern to collect rainwater, far from any trade routes and with few occupants at its time of completion. From 1584 to 1590, it underwent Renaissance-style modifications, losing none of its fortress features as it looks down from a steep rocky cliff. In the 18th century, it stopped serving as a noble residence and fell into a state of disrepair before being renovated in 1823. In 1897, it was purchased by Princess Hohenlohe and in 1924, the times of the First Republic, bought by the President of Škoda, Josef Šimonek. As of 2020, it was owned by his descendants.

Nazis occupied the castle during World War II and multiple myths abound regarding the Nazis' supposed occult involvements there. Another source states locals believed that the Nazis had been using the "powers of Hell" for their experiments. The castle has been open to the public since 1999. Tourists may visit the chapel with fading frescoes and murals "including pictures of demon-like figures and animal-like beings".

== Legends ==
Folklore surrounding the castle alleges that it was built on a rock covering a chasm that leads to hell. One of the earliest versions of the legend appears in Václav Hájek of Libočany’s 16th-century Kronika česká, a narrative history of Bohemia from AD 644 to AD 1526. This account describes a hole in the rock near Houska inhabited by spirits that frightened travelers. Animal-human hybrids were reported to have crawled out of it, and dark-winged, otherworldly creatures flew in its vicinity. Houska’s unusual location, away from major trade routes and without a natural water source, has helped fuel the legend that the castle was built to seal the supposed gateway to Hell beneath it rather than for a conventional defensive purpose.

Houska Castle, and most specifically the chapel, was constructed over a large hole in the ground that is a "gateway to Hell", which is allegedly so deep that no one could see the bottom of it. Legend has it that when construction began in the castle, all of the prisoners that were sentenced to death were offered a pardon if they consented to be lowered by rope into the hole, and report back on what they saw. When the first person was lowered, he began screaming after a few seconds, and when pulled back to the surface, he looked as if he had aged 30 years. He had grown wrinkles and his hair had turned white.

According to the Prague Tourism web site, the castle is reputed to have various types of ghosts, "a bullfrog/human creature, a headless horse, and an old woman" as well as the remains of "demonic beasts who escaped the pit".

The pit in the lower levels of the castle is said to be a gateway to hell. Thus, by constructing the Gothic building's defensive walls facing inward, they were able to keep the demons trapped in the lower level's thickest walls closest to the hole of the castle.

== In popular culture ==
The Travel Channel series "Legendary Locations" covered several sites in Season 2, Episode 4, including the castle "said to protect a portal to hell".

Houska Castle was featured on an episode of Ghost Hunters International which aired on SyFy on 22 July 2009. Most Haunted Live visited the castle on March 26, 2010. The French team of paranormal investigators, R.I.P recherches investigations paranormal, investigated the Castle in 2013 in their episode "The Hell Gate" (Episode 3, Season 2).

This folklore was also the basis for the Doctor Who graphic novel Herald of Madness (2019), which is set at Houska Castle and was first published in Doctor Who Magazine 535–539.

Houska Castle was mentioned on an episode of the Forbidden History Podcast entitled "The Devil's Bible" (2022).

Houska Castle was recently featured on an episode of Expedition X Season 9 Episode 3 & 4 (Discovery Channel) (2025).

Houska Castle was also featured on an episode of The UnXplained Season 8 Episode 8 entitled "Satan's Army" (2026).
