= Under Offer =

British game show

- Presented by: Yvette Fielding
- Starring: Team Captains; Fred Dinenage; Toyah Willcox
- Country of origin: United Kingdom
- Original language: English
- No. of series: 4
- No. of episodes: 51

Production
- Running time: 30 minutes (inc. adverts)
- Production companies: Prospect Pictures (Series 1-2); HTV West (Series 3-4)

Original release
- Network: ITV (Meridian)
- Release: 14 April 1998 – 17 June 2001

Under Offer is a property game show that aired on ITV, exclusively in the Meridian region, from 14 April 1998 to 17 June 2001 and ran for 4 series. It was hosted by Yvette Fielding and team captained by Fred Dinenage and Toyah Willcox.

== Transmissions ==
Series	Start date	End date	Episodes
1	14 April 1998	7 July 1998	12
2	30 April 1999	23 July 1999	13
3	27 April 2000	3 August 2000	13
4	11 March 2001	17 June 2001	13
