= Kelloholm =

Coordinates: 55.3821°N 3.995°W

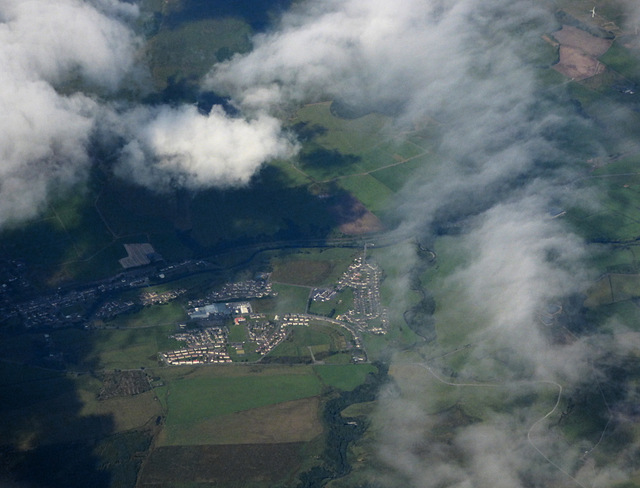
- Aerial view

- Location within Dumfries and Galloway
- OS grid reference: NS737116
- Council area: Dumfries and Galloway
- Lieutenancy area: Dumfriesshire
- Country: Scotland
- Sovereign state: United Kingdom
- Post town: SANQUHAR
- Postcode district: DG4
- Dialling code: 01659
- Police: Scotland
- Fire: Scottish
- Ambulance: Scottish
- UK Parliament: Dumfriesshire, Clydesdale and Tweeddale
- Scottish Parliament: Dumfriesshire

Kelloholm is a village in Dumfries and Galloway, Scotland. It has a primary school, a public house and several shops. Kelloholm lies next to Kirkconnel and the two have begun to merge. Kelloholm was originally constructed to serve the many mines in the area, all of which have now closed.

== History ==
Kelloholm gets its name from the Kello Water and the village began to appear in the early 20th century.

== Governance ==
Kelloholm is part of the Dumfriesshire, Clydesdale and Tweeddale (UK Parliament constituency) and is represented by the Conservative Party MP David Mundell.

== Transport ==
The A76 road runs through the area. Kelloholm is served by bus routes 221 and 246 and by Kirkconnel railway station on the Glasgow South Western Line.

== Notable people ==
- David Wells, astrologer and spiritual medium.
