= Karl Beattie =

English television director, producer and cameraman

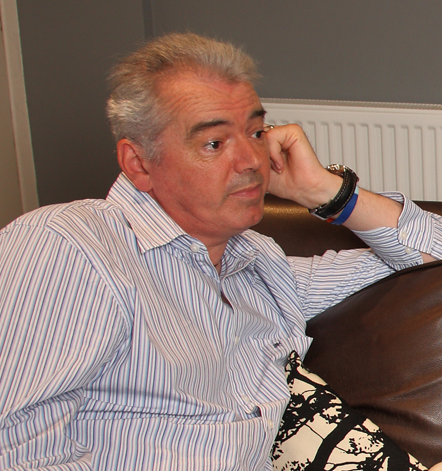
- Beattie in 2014
- Born: Guildford, Surrey, England, UK
- Occupation: Co-owner of Antix Productions
- Known for: Director/Producer on Most Haunted
- Spouse: Yvette Fielding (m. 1999)
- Children: 2

Karl Beattie is an English television director, producer and cameraman. Beattie and wife Yvette Fielding co-own and run Antix Productions.

== Career ==
Karl Beattie's documented life has references to him teaching martial arts within the US. In 2002, Karl Beattie and Yvette Fielding, established their own television production company, Antix Productions. Their first production was Most Haunted for the British TV channel Sky Living, along with a number of spin offs including Most Haunted Live!. In 2006 he created, produced and directed Ghosthunting With..., a paranormal show for ITV2 which features Yvette Fielding leading various celebrities around haunted locations. In 2008, Beattie and Fielding launched The Paranormal Channel, later known as The Unexplained Channel, which ran for two years.

== Controversy ==
In 2004, Beattie was the subject of media attention when it was claimed he was the only living samurai outside Japan, something he denies, as one of only eight foreigners to have ever been awarded the title. The samurai class was officially abolished in 1868, though Beattie said that the title lives on in him via his Japanese instructor, Otsu Maeda.

There were claims of showmanship being used in the TV show Most Haunted on Living TV, including the 2015 Most Haunted Live, but the claims have been rejected by Beattie on Twitter. Three days after the live show Beattie staged a reconstruction to explain what some viewers claimed was faked. With his reconstruction, he showed the episode was not faked explaining how the camera cable is attached to his belt to prevent it snagging – a standard procedure in broadcasting.

In 2005 the broadcasting regulator, Ofcom, said: "On balance, we consider that overall Most Haunted/Most Haunted Live should be taken to be a programme produced for entertainment, as such this programme should be seen in the light of shows where techniques are used which mean the audience is not necessarily in full possession of the facts."

== Personal life ==
Karl Beattie met Yvette Fielding while they were working on City Hospital. They have a daughter, and he is stepfather to Yvette's son. They live on a farm in Sandbach, Cheshire.
