= Unexplained Channel =

British television channel

The Unexplained Channel
- Country: UK
- Broadcast area: UK & Ireland

Programming
- Picture format: PAL (576i, (SDTV)

Ownership
- Owner: Monster Pictures

History
- Launched: 9 June 2008
- Closed: 21 April 2010
- Former names: The Paranormal Channel (until 10 August 2009)

The Unexplained Channel was an entertainment TV channel broadcast in the UK on the Sky Digital platform. The channel claimed to be the first TV channel in the world dedicated to the paranormal, and aimed to be ground breaking in its investigation of the subject.

The channel was backed by UK television personality Yvette Fielding and her husband Karl Beattie through their Monster Pictures production company. The channel was launched as The Paranormal Channel on 9 June 2008, and was rebranded as The Unexplained Channel on 10 August 2009.

The Unexplained Channel was aimed at fans of the paranormal, and broadcast documentaries, dramas and films on the subject. Previous programming included Arthur C. Clarke's mysterious world and Strange, but true? as well as original programming presented by Karl Beattie, Yvette Fielding and Paul Ross.

The Unexplained Channel's EPG slot on Sky Digital was purchased by Information TV Limited, who on 21 April 2010 moved Showcase to channel 201 and launched Showcase 2 on channel 216.

Showcase now broadcasts Irish TV so the slot was removed.

== Original programmes ==
- Ghosts of the asylum
- Paul Ross's Big Black Book of Horror
- Phantom photos
- Sexy spirits with David Nunn
- Whines and spirits
- Yvette's screaming banshees
