= Geoffrey Beattie =

British psychologist, author and broadcaster

Geoffrey Beattie FBPsS FRSM FRSA
- Born: Belfast
- Education: University of Birmingham, University of Cambridge
- Scientific career
- Fields: Social psychology
- Workplaces: University of Sheffield, University of Manchester, Edge Hill University
- Thesis: An exploration of the role of language production in the organization of behaviour in face-to-face interaction (1978)

Geoffrey Beattie is a British psychologist, author and broadcaster. He is Professor of Psychology at Edge Hill University and in 2023 was appointed visiting scholar at the Oxford Centre for Life-Writing (OCLW) and Wolfson College, University of Oxford. He has also been visiting professor at the Bren School of Environmental Science and Management, University of California Santa Barbara. He graduated with a First Class Honours degree from the University of Birmingham and a PhD from Trinity College, Cambridge. He is a Fellow of the British Psychological Society, a Fellow of the Royal Society of Medicine and a Fellow of the Royal Society of Arts. He is also a writer, and two of his books were optioned by a Hollywood studio. The movie ‘Giant’ starring Pierce Brosnan will be in cinemas in January 2026. Beattie is Executive Producer, alongside the legendary Sylvester Stallone.

== Books ==
He has published twenty-nine books on a wide range of topics including the psychology of language and communication, nonverbal communication/body language, the psychology of sustainability and climate change, implicit ethnic bias, prejudice and conflict, applying psychological techniques to everyday life, the psychology of sport, boxing and running, ethnographic studies of working-class life in the UK and a memoir 'Protestant Boy' published by Granta in 2004, amongst others.

'We are the People' was shortlisted for the Ewart-Biggs Literary Prize. 'On the Ropes' was shortlisted for the William Hill Sports Book of the Year Award. 'Trophy Hunting' was shortlisted for the 2019 Taylor & Francis Outstanding Book and Digital Product Award in the Outstanding Professional Category. 'The Psychology of Language and Communication' was republished in the Routledge Classic Editions series, thirty years after it first appeared. 'Survivors of Steel City' formed the basis for the documentary film 'Tales from a Hard City' (director: Kim Flitcroft) which won the Grand Prix at the Marseilles Film Festival and the Best Regional Film in the Indies Award. Beattie was credited as story consultant on the film.

Beattie has also published two novels—'The Corner Boys' (Victor Gollancz) and 'The Body's Little Secrets' (Gibson Square). 'The Corner Boys', the story of a teenager growing up in a loyalist working-class neighbourhood of Belfast during the Troubles, was also shortlisted for the Ewart-Biggs Literary Prize . 'The Body's Little Secrets' is the story of a social psychologist, Matt, whose research centres on the analysis of body language. The novel situates the action in Sheffield in Thatcher's Britain of the early nineteen-eighties, just after the miners' strike with the mines and the steelworks closing. Self-construction is the nature of the day, trying still to be somebody in desperate times. Matt himself is trying to make a name for himself as an academic in this changing societal landscape but oversteps the mark in his claims about what his body language analyses can reveal from CCTV footage of a murder, to his ultimate cost. In a review in the international journal Semiotica, Professor Marcel Danesi, professor of semiotics at the University of Toronto, described the book as a 'truly outstanding work' and wrote that 'With his latest novel, Dr Geoffrey Beattie can now be projected onto the same international platform as the late Umberto Eco, who became famous for integrating semiotic theory with fiction, starting with his bestseller, The Name of the Rose...There is little doubt, in my estimation at least, that Geoffrey Beattie is Eco's successor, displaying an uncanny and ingenious ability to blend his insightful work on nonverbal semiotics with an exceptional sense for narrative in this outstanding roman-à-clef.'

His book 'Selfless: A Psychologist's Journey through Identity and Social Class', published by Routledge, which is a memoir reflecting on identity, social class and education, attracted excellent international reviews—'a powerful mix of psychological research, intellectual rigour and personal insight' (Binna Kandola), 'a unique book....We come away understanding what psychology should be....required reading by anyone interested in understanding what consciousness is' (Marcel Danesi, University of Toronto), 'has the potential to contribute to relevant fields of inquiry in the same way Oliver Sacks' books did to neurology and the history of science' (Hongbing Yu, Ryerson University). A review in the Psychologist read 'We need more books like this—where the author is authentically written into the work, and psychology is opened up, inviting people to explore it in relation to their own lives.'

His recent book 'Doubt: A Psychological Exploration' was described by Professor Brian Butterworth from UCL as 'Beattie brilliantly illustrates the science of doubt with fascinating case studies from doubters like Kafka, to non-doubters like Picasso.' Professor Richard Bentall from the University of Sheffield wrote 'Geoff Beattie has written a brilliantly entertaining book about the little considered phenomenon of doubt, focusing mainly but not exclusively on self-doubt.' Professor Marcel Danesi from the University of Toronto wrote 'This is one of the most brilliant books I have ever come across.'

His books have been translated into various languages including Chinese, Taiwanese, Korean, Portuguese, Italian, Finnish and German. He has also published over one hundred academic articles in journals including Nature, Nature Climate Change and Semiotica.

His books 'On the Ropes: Boxing as a Way of Life' (Victor Gollancz) and ‘The Shadows of Boxing’ (Orion) were optioned by a major Hollywood studio to be made into a film. The books focused on Brendan Ingle's famous gym in Wincobank in Sheffield and explores boxing in precarious economic times after the pit closures and the decline of the steel industry. The Daily Telegraph's review of the book read "Beattie can write about the low life of boxing like no-one else…[He] has got the smell of the gym in his lungs. He breathes resin, sweat and soiled towels. He even goes three rounds himself with Mick Mills. He writes for adults, and quite beautifully. Not since I first went ringside with the late Ring Lardner have I so enjoyed a book on boxing". The Hollywood studio, AGC, picked up the film rights to the book; Rowan Athale wrote the screenplay and directed the film.

== Research ==
Beattie's research falls within the broad areas of embodied cognition/multi-modal communication and applied social psychology particularly in the areas of sustainability and race where he researches the relationship between explicit and implicit processes, and the societal implications of any possible 'dissociation' here.

=== Multi-modal communication ===
His long-standing interest in human multi-modal communication focuses on the interaction between language and nonverbal communication in talk. He was awarded the Spearman Medal by the British Psychological Society for 'published psychological research of outstanding merit' for work in this area. His research shows that both verbal and nonverbal elements are critical to everyday semantic communication and that iconic hand gestures reflect unarticulated aspects of thinking. He has explored the possible applications of this theoretical perspective for both advertising and for deception, where gesture-speech mismatches may occur, along with structural changes in the phases of gestures. This research won the international Mouton d'Or prize for the best research paper in semiotics.

=== Sustainability ===
He has also explored the psychological barriers that prevent consumers adopting more sustainable lifestyles in the light of the threat posed by climate change. He has challenged the established orthodoxy in this field. DEFRA, and others, have argued that the promotion of more sustainable behaviour is essentially just an 'informational' issue because the public already have the right underlying attitudes to environmental issues like carbon footprint (measured using various self-report instruments). For this reason, carbon labels were introduced. Beattie's experimental research, using eye tracking, showed that there was minimal visual attention to carbon labels and that explicit self-reported attitudes to carbon footprint did not actually predict visual attention to climate change images. Measures of implicit attitude, where such attitudes are largely unconscious and measured through speed of association, were, however, better predictors of both attentional focus and behavioural choice under certain conditions. Dispositional optimism also seems to affect visual attention to climate change images and this links to optimism bias (He presented this research at the British Academy Summer Showcase in 2018 where the best research funded by the B.A. is highlighted). He has explored new segmentation analyses of consumer markets based upon the intersection of explicit and implicit attitudes and researching how to change both types of attitude, necessary to produce the radical shift in consumer behaviour required to combat climate change.

Beattie presented this research on sustainability at the United Nations Conference on Climate Change at UNESCO headquarters in Paris in July 2015, and with Laura McGuire contributed a chapter to the United Nations International Commission on Education for Sustainable-Development-Practice Report (a report issued every ten years by the U.N. to define priorities in education internationally for the next decade), to be published in 2019.

=== Implicit racial bias ===
Another strand of his current research is into implicit racial bias and its effects on everyday life. He has explored how implicit racial attitudes impact on shortlisting decisions. He has shown how gaze fixations, as we consider CVs, are influenced by our implicit attitudes, and he has investigated how these impact on the representations that we build up of the various candidates under consideration, thereby influencing our final 'rational' decision about the relative suitability of the candidates. He has researched how people justify and rationalise their everyday decisions that often result from processes that are more implicit. Using the terminology of the Nobel Laureate Daniel Kahneman, he has explored how System 1 and System 2 interact in everyday life and the implications of this interaction for both behaviour and talk. He has given a number of significant keynote addresses on this theme at a variety of applied conferences, including the Annual Conference of the Staffordshire Fire and Rescue Service, the Asian Fire Service Association National Conference, the Equality Challenge Unit Biennial Conference, the Respect Difference Conference, Police Service of Northern Ireland etc.

The overarching focus of his research has been on how human beings communicate and make decisions in their everyday social worlds, with emphasis on the more unconscious and implicit aspects of these everyday processes. He has been interested, throughout his career, in the real-world relevance of his research.

== Outreach ==
Beattie was president of the Psychology Section of the British Association for the Advancement of Science in 2005–2006 and has given many keynote addresses to a range of audience, including public lectures at Gresham College, the International Psychology Conference in Dubai, the Psychology Teacher National Conference, the European Conference on Psychology and the Behavioral Sciences, Techkriti, the Annual Technical and Entrepreneurial Festival Kanpur, India, both Houses of Parliament through the Westminster Food and Nutrition Forum, the Star lecture at the University of Manchester etc. He has also spoken at various music and book festivals including 'The Secret Garden Party', 'Shambala', Latitude and the Edinburgh, Munich and Cheltenham Book Festivals. Beattie was an external consultant on the Leadership Vanguard (LV) with Paul Polman, then CEO of Unilever, and others. This organisation was designed to help shape the sustainability policy of Unilever and other leading multinationals.

He is also well known for bringing analyses of behaviour, and particularly nonverbal communication, to a more general audience by appearing as the on-screen psychologist on eleven series of Big Brother in the UK and for explaining how psychology can be used by people in their everyday lives. His work in psychology has been extensively covered in the national and international media.

In addition, he has carried out media work on behalf of a range of organizations, including ITV, Universal Pictures, Department for Work and Pensions, NHS, Nivea, Royal Mail, Disney and the Foreign and Commonwealth Office.

== Academic appointments ==
2023- Visiting Scholar, University of Oxford (OCLW and Wolfson College).
2013- Professor of Psychology, Edge Hill University.
2013- Masters Supervisor, Sustainability Leadership Programme, University of Cambridge.
2012-2013- Visiting professor, Bren School of Environmental Science and Management, University of California, Santa Barbara.
2004-2011- Head of School of Psychological Sciences at the University of Manchester.
2004-2012- Research Group Leader, Language and Communication Research Group, School of Psychological Sciences, University of Manchester.
2008-2012- Professorial Research Fellow, Sustainable Consumption Institute, University of Manchester.
2004-2011- Member of the senior management board for the Faculty of Medical and Human Sciences, University of Manchester.
2000-2004- Member of the Senior Executive, Faculty of Science and Engineering, University of Manchester.
2000-2004- Head of department of psychology, University of Manchester.
1994-2012- Professor of Psychology at the University of Manchester. His departure in 2012 led to Employment Tribunal proceedings. The Employment Tribunal found in favour of Professor Beattie. The university made a financial settlement to Professor Beattie in respect of Employment Tribunal case number 2401282/2013.
1991-1994- Reader in Social Psychology, University of Sheffield
1988-1991- Senior Lecturer in Social Psychology, University of Sheffield
1981-1984- Visiting lecturer, Department of Linguistics, University of Gothenburg, Sweden
1977-1988- Lecturer in Social Psychology, University of Sheffield

== Media ==
=== Television ===
Resident on-screen psychologist [Big Brother] ([Channel 4]) 2000-2010 focussing mainly on nonverbal communication and patterns of social interaction Big Brother 2007

Co-presenter, Life's Too Short (BBC1) This series applied psychological insights (including detailed behavioural analyses) to a range of people having trouble in their relationships. BBC1: Life's Too Short episode guide

Presenter, Family SOS (BBC1 Northern Ireland) A detailed look at families currently experiencing a wide range of important but unidentified psychological issues. The analytic focus was again on the behaviour of the family members and how they interacted with each other. The goal was to work out what specifically needed to change to improve the situation. BBC Northern Ireland

Presenter, Dump Your Mates in Four Days (Channel 4) A series aimed at teenagers which allowed teenagers to 'try out' different sets of friends in order to teach them something about themselves and their social networks and how things can change. Dump Your Mates in Four Days (Channel 4)

Co-presenter and psychologist, The Farm of Fussy Eaters (UKTV Style) A series focusing on individuals with oddly constrained and unhealthy food choices. His role was to understand where the various attitudes to food came from and how they could be modified. UKTV The Farm of Fussy Eaters

On-screen psychologist, Ghosthunting with.... (ITV2 and ITV1) On-screen psychologist, focusing on the nonverbal behaviour of celebrities in various 'haunted' locations. The celebrities have included Girls Aloud, Coronation Street, Emmerdale, McFly, The Happy Mondays, Paul O'Grady and friends, Boyzone, The Saturdays, Katie Price and friends, TOWIE etc. Ghosthunting With....The Saturdays

He has also been a frequent guest on the ITV News (with a slot called 'The Body Politic' at one General Election ), Lorraine Kelly, Richard and Judy, The One Show, Tonight with Trevor McDonald (ITV), with other guest appearances on Child of Our Time, Arena, It's Only a Theory, Risky Business, Tomorrow's World, The Heart of the Matter, Watchdog, BBC Breakfast, Good Morning America, the Keri-Anne Show (Australia), TV4 (Sweden), News Asia, The Mindfield, and various documentaries for Channel 4, Channel 5, BBC4 and Sky.

=== Journalism ===
He has written extensively for The Guardian, The Observer, The Observer Magazine, The Independent and The Independent on Sunday.

== Books ==
- Beattie, G. (2025) Understanding Climate Anxiety. Routledge: London.
- Beattie, G. (2024) Lies, Lying and Liars: A Psychological Analysis. Routledge: London.
- Beattie, G. (2023) Doubt: A Psychological Exploration. Routledge: London.
- Beattie, G. (2020) Selfless: A Psychologist's Journey through Identity and Social Class. Routledge: London.
- Beattie, G. (2019). Trophy Hunting: A Psychological Perspective. London: Routledge
- Beattie, G. & McGuire, L. (2019). The Psychology of Climate Change. London: Routledge
- Beattie, G. (2018). The Body's Little Secrets: A Novel. London: Gibson Square
- Beattie, G. (2018). The Conflicted Mind: And Why Psychology Has Failed to Deal With It. London: Routledge
- Beattie, G. & Ellis, A. (2017). The Psychology of Language and Communication: Psychology Press Classic Editions. London: Routledge
- Beattie, G. (2016). Rethinking Body Language: How Hand Movements Reveal Hidden Thoughts. London: Routledge
- Beattie, G. (2013). Our Racist Heart? An Exploration of Unconscious Prejudice in Everyday Life. London: Routledge
- Beattie, G and Beattie, B. (2012). Chasing Lost Times. A Father and Son Reconciled Through Running. London: Mainstream Publishing
- Beattie, G. (2011). Get The Edge: How Simple Changes Will Transform Your Life. London: Headline Book Publishing.
- Beattie, G. (2010). Why Aren't We Saving The Planet? A Psychologist's Perspective. UK: Routledge: London.
- Beattie, G. (2004). Protestant Boy. Granta: London.
- Beattie, G. (2003). Visible Thought: The New Psychology of Body Language. Routledge: London.
- Beattie, G. (2002). The Shadows of Boxing: Prince Naseem and those he left behind. Orion: London.
- Beattie, G. (2000). The Corner Boys. Klett-Cotta: Berlin.
- Beattie, G. (1999). Belfastin Pojat. Otava: Helsinki.
- Beattie, G. (1998). Head-to-Head: Uncovering the Psychology of Sporting Success. Victor Gollancz: London.
- Beattie, G. (1998). Hard Lines: Voices from Deep within a Recession. Mandolin: Manchester.
- Beattie, G. (1998). The Corner Boys. Victor Gollancz: London. Published in paperback, Indigo: London (1999).
- Beattie, G. (1996). On the Ropes: Boxing as a Way of Life. Victor Gollancz: London. Published in paperback, Indigo: London (1997).
- Beattie, G. (1992). We Are the People. Journeys Through the Heart of Protestant Ulster. Heinemann: London. (pp. 246).
- Beattie, G. (1990). England After Dark. Weidenfeld & Nicolson:London.
- Beattie, G. (1989). All Talk: Why it's important to watch your words and everything else you say. Weidenfeld & Nicolson: London.
- Beattie, G. (1988). Beachwatching. Rambletree Press: Hove.
- Beattie, G. (1987). Making It: The Reality of Today's Entrepreneurs. Weidenfeld & Nicolson: London.
- Beattie, G. (1986). Survivors of Steel City. Chatto & Windus: London.
- Ellis, A. & Beattie, G. (1986). The Psychology of Language and Communication. Psychology Press: London.
- Beattie, G. (1983) Talk: An Analysis of Speech and Non-Verbal Behaviour in Conversation. Open University Press: Milton Keynes.
