= Yvette Fielding =

English television presenter, producer and actress

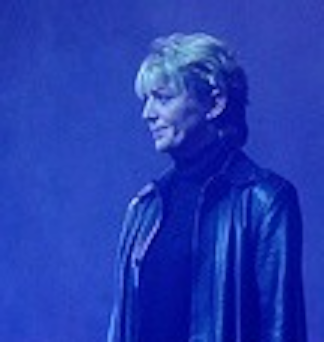
- Fielding filming Most Haunted in 2002
- Born: Yvette Paula Fielding; 23 September 1968 (age 58); Stockport, Cheshire, England
- Occupations: Television presenter; producer; actress; author
- Years active: 1983–present
- Television: Blue Peter; Most Haunted; Most Haunted Live! Ghosthunting With...
- Spouse(s): Barry Sweeny (1993–divorced); Karl Beattie (m. 1999)
- Children: 2
- Relatives: Stuart Torevell (cousin)

Yvette Paula Fielding (born 23 September 1968) is an English television presenter, producer, actress, writer and paranormal investigator. In 1987, aged 18, she became the youngest presenter on the BBC television programme Blue Peter. With her husband Karl Beattie, she co-created and presented the Most Haunted series on the Living channel, via their own production company, followed by Ghosthunting With.... She has appeared in a wide range of other programmes, including The Wright Stuff and I'm a Celebrity...Get Me Out of Here!.

== Early life ==
Fielding was born 23 September 1968 in Stockport, Cheshire, North West England to Angela and Alan Fielding. She grew up in Bramhall where she attended Pownall Green Primary School and Bramhall High School. She attended Stockport Convent, Hillcrest Grammar School, Davenport and Dane Bank College in Crewe.

As a teenager she worked as a hotel cleaner in Wilmslow, and a barmaid in Cheadle Hulme and Macclesfield.

== Career ==
=== Early career ===
Fielding's first major role came in 1983 when she was cast in the children's BBC series Seaview. The comedy-drama show centred around a teenage girl called Sandy Shelton (played by Fielding), growing up living at her parents' guest house in Blackpool. The show ran for two series. Fielding later made a guest appearance in an episode of Juliet Bravo.

=== Blue Peter and beyond ===
In 1987, Fielding became a presenter on the BBC children's show Blue Peter. To date Fielding holds the record of being the youngest presenter on Blue Peter, starting on 29 June 1987 three months before her 19th birthday. While on the series Fielding also had an acting role in Last of the Summer Wine (making an appearance in the series while making a Blue Peter report on the show). During her time on the show, Fielding won the SOS Award for the Most Popular Woman on Television, competing with Cilla Black, Victoria Wood and Kylie Minogue.

Years after Fielding left Blue Peter, her trip on a rollercoaster with fellow presenter Mark Curry was voted the Favourite Blue Peter moment of all time by viewers. After five years of Blue Peter, Fielding co-hosted What's Up Doc?, a Saturday morning children's show on ITV. The series ran for three years.

From 1995 Fielding made a transition from children's television to broadcasting for an older audience. After leaving What's Up Doc? Fielding presented The Heaven and Earth Show, The General and City Hospital for the BBC. She was a regular host of Karaoke Challenge and contributed weekend continuity for Challenge TV. Fielding also appeared in the ITV game show Win, Lose or Draw in 1995 and 1996. Fielding briefly returned to children's television in 1997, appearing in two episodes of the CBBC drama series Byker Grove, playing the role of Samantha Fuller.

From 1998 to 2000, Fielding appeared as a regular alongside Fred Dinenage and Toyah Willcox on a property-pricing based game-show called Under Offer made for Meridian Television. In 2003, Fielding appeared as a guest on the Channel 4 chat show Richard & Judy.

In 2004, Fielding was named 'Multichannel personality of the year' at the Variety Club Showbusiness awards. In 2005, Fielding appeared as Annie Lennox in a celebrity special of ITV's Stars in Their Eyes, and also appeared as a guest panellist on Channel 5 show The Wright Stuff (Fielding made further guest appearances on the show in 2008 and 2009).

In 2007, Fielding appeared as a guest on the ITV chat show Loose Women, and appeared as a contestant in the ITV2 reality television programme Deadline, finishing second. Later on in the year she appeared as a guest on That Antony Cotton Show. In January 2008, Fielding appeared as a contestant on the BBC quiz show Celebrity Mastermind, with her specialist subject being Henry VIII.

Fielding and her husband were the celebrity subjects of a one-hour documentary for Living called Living With Yvette & Karl which aired on 1 November 2008. A sequel documentary entitled In Bed with Yvette & Karl which aired on Living on 17 January 2009, charted Fielding's hysterectomy operation and recovery. A full-length series of In Bed with Yvette & Karl, was then commissioned, and aired on Living during June and July 2009. In October 2009, a further documentary entitled Yvette & Karl: Life begins at 40 was broadcast. From February to March 2009, Fielding appeared in the ITV1 variety TV show Saturday Night Takeaway.

On 21 May 2009, Fielding appeared for a fourth time on The Paul O'Grady Show, and a day later, she appeared on Friday Night with Jonathan Ross. In May 2009, Fielding appeared as a guest on the ITV talent show spin-off Britain's Got More Talent. In July 2009, Fielding was a celebrity panellist in an episode of the Channel 4 comedy show 8 out of 10 Cats. In November 2009, Fielding appeared as a celebrity contestant in an episode of Come Dine with Me, finishing third. In May 2010, Fielding appeared as a guest on the Channel 5 chat show Justin Lee Collins: Good Times. In December 2011, Fielding appeared as part of a celebrity team on the BBC Two quiz show Eggheads.

=== Presenting the paranormal ===
In 2002, Yvette Fielding and her husband Karl Beattie established their own television production company, Antix Productions. Their first production was Most Haunted for the British TV channel Living. In the show, Fielding and paranormal experts investigate various supposedly haunted locations around Britain, in the hopes that paranormal activity may be documented by the crew. In 2006, Fielding presented and produced Ghosthunting With..., a paranormal show for ITV2 which shows Fielding leading various celebrities around haunted locations.

Fielding has made many appearances and interviews in the British media in connection with her paranormal investigations and programmes, including guest appearances on The Sunday Night Project (Channel 4), The Chris Moyles Show (BBC Radio 1) and Friday Night with Jonathan Ross (BBC One). Furthering her paranormal franchise, in 2008 Fielding made her first move into radio broadcasting, hosting Yvette Fielding's Fright Nights on Kerrang! Radio. Fielding left the radio station a few months later however, due to other work commitments.

In 2008, Fielding and Beattie formed a new company called Monster Pictures to operate the Paranormal Channel. Fielding acted as anchor to the channel and presented original programming on the station. The channel was subsequently renamed the Unexplained Channel in 2009. In October 2009, a two-part documentary featuring Fielding with Paul O'Grady aired on Living entitled Death in Venice. The documentary saw the pair investigating claims of ghost and vampire sightings in Poveglia, Italy.

Fielding announced on 25 June 2010 that she was to step down as presenter of Most Haunted. In subsequent interviews, Fielding also indicated that she would finish presenting Ghosthunting with.. and all other paranormal-based broadcasts in 2010. However, in May 2011, Fielding appeared in an episode of the UK version of the Celebrity Ghost Stories series for the bio channel, with the entire UK series of Celebrity Ghost Stories being produced by Fielding's Antix Productions company. Then in September 2011 Fielding presented another episode of Ghosthunting with... featuring the cast of The Only Way Is Essex.

In April 2012, Fielding appeared in an episode of Olly: Life on Murs, in which she and Olly Murs visited a haunted house. In October 2012, Fielding appeared on BBC Radio 2 and The Alan Titchmarsh Show on ITV1 talking about the paranormal and her ghost hunting career. In these interviews Fielding stated that she will return to Most Haunted in 2013. In 2014, Fielding once again returned to hosting Most Haunted, when a new series was produced for the Freeview channel, Really.

In March 2013, Fielding appeared in the Peter Kay Sit down for Comic Relief comedy sketch as part of Red Nose Day 2013. In June 2013 she co-hosted Real Radio North West's breakfast show, with Glen Hunt, as a stand in for the regular co-host, Lorna Bancroft.

As well as presenting Most Haunted, Fielding also ran and co-owned a tea shop in Manchester called 'Propertea', near to Manchester Cathedral until 2016 when she left to start her own tea shop.

In 2015, Fielding was a celebrity homeowner in an episode of Through the Keyhole.

In November 2015, Fielding took part in the ITV reality series I'm A Celebrity... Get Me Out of Here! She finished the show in tenth place after being evicted on 30 November.

== Personal life ==
Fielding has a son from her first marriage. She married her second husband Karl Beattie in 1999. Their daughter was born in the same year.

Fielding has stated that she was sexually assaulted by Rolf Harris when she was alone in a TV studio with him during her time as a presenter of Blue Peter.
