= Fred Batt =

English businessman

Frederick George Batt
- Born: September 1948; London, England, United Kingdom
- Other name: Fred Batt
- Known for: Demonologist on Most Haunted
- Website: fredbatt.com

Fred Batt is a former English businessman, nightclub owner, singer, actor and self-styled historian and demonologist known for his regular appearances on the British paranormal reality television series Most Haunted. Fred Batt states that his interest in the occult began as a teenager. He made his first appearance as a presenter on Most Haunted in 2008 on a live Hallowe'en special; he had previously appeared as a guest on the show in 2003 at his home and again, at his nightclub Caesar's in Streatham. He became a regular presenter on the show in the 2010–11 series and rejoined for the 2013 series.

From 1994 to 2010, Fred Batt owned Caesar's, a 2300-capacity nightclub in London SW2; in an episode of Most Haunted filmed there in 2003 he claimed the venue was haunted by the spirit of Ruth Ellis who had worked there as a Hostess in 1948. In 2004, Batt became involved in lengthy licensing hearings in Lambeth when the police and local councillors objected to Caesar's receiving a new alcohol licence because of the heavy drain the venue placed on police resources.
