= Antix Productions =

English television production company

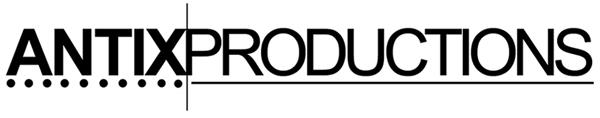
- Type: Private
- Industry: Television
- Genre: Production company
- Founded: Cheadle, Stockport, Greater Manchester
- Founder: Yvette Fielding; Karl Beattie
- Headquarters: Sandbach, Cheshire, England
- Key people: Yvette Fielding; Karl Beattie

Antix Productions is a television production company founded by Yvette Fielding and Karl Beattie in 2001. The company has produced shows for broadcasters such as Living and ITV in the UK and Travel Channel in the United States. Their output includes successful shows such as Most Haunted and its various sister shows such as Most Haunted Live!.

Originally, Antix Productions was based in Cheadle in the Metropolitan Borough of Stockport, Greater Manchester, but relocated to an office within MediaCityUK in Salford, Greater Manchester in 2011.

== Productions ==
=== Most Haunted ===
- Most Haunted
- Most Haunted Live!
- Most Haunted Extra
- Most Haunted: Recurring Nightmares

=== Other ===
- Ghosthunting with...
- The Ride
- Pop Talk
- Celebrity Daredevils
- Celebrity Ghost Stories UK
- Death in Venice
- Living with Yvette and Karl
- Spook School
- The Enfield Poltergeist
- Ghosthunters

== The Paranormal Channel ==
In 2008, Antix Productions launched The Paranormal Channel. The channel (launched 9 June 2008) broadcast a mix of programmes on the paranormal including documentaries, films and dramas. The channel was subsequently renamed the Unexplained Channel. However, in April 2010, the Unexplained Channel ceased broadcasting, with its EPG slot on Sky Digital being purchased by Information TV.
