= Most Haunted Live! =

- Series title card
- Created by: Yvette Fielding; Karl Beattie
- Developed by: Antix Productions
- Starring: Yvette Fielding; Karl Beattie; Stuart Torevell; Derek Acorah; Fred Batt; Glen Hunt; Mary Beattie; Darren Hutchinson; Gregg Smith; Jennifer Bryant
- Country of origin: United Kingdom
- No. of episodes: 37 events (list of episodes)

Production
- Executive producers: Yvette Fielding; Karl Beattie

Original release
- Release: 31 October 2002 – present

Related
- Most Haunted YouTube Shorts

Most Haunted Live is a spin-off of the paranormal reality television series Most Haunted and was also produced by Antix Productions. The show consists of paranormal investigations broadcast live over a period of one or more nights, usually with interactive sections that involve the viewer.

Following a five-year hiatus, Most Haunted Live returned to our screens, this time on UKTV's Really on 31 October 2015. Most Haunted Live was back on 31 October 2019, Hallowe'en Night, exclusive to the official YouTube channel.

== Production ==
The first episode of Most Haunted Live! was broadcast on Living on 31 October 2002, from Dudley Castle and was produced jointly by Antix and Hanrahan Media. The format of the show under this joint venture was different from Most Haunted, with different music cues and production style. The next seven live events were produced by Hanrahan. From the 2004 Summer Solstice live event onwards, the Most Haunted Live events were produced by Antix with the production style overhauled to ensure the live events had the same production style as the recorded series.

The first Most Haunted Live! show aired for only one night but over time this increased to three. The first exception was the Halloween 2005 show in London, which was broadcast for three nights. Since then there have been live shows which have lasted five nights (Halloween 2007 & Turin 2008), seven nights (Halloween 2008 and Liverpool 2009) and eight nights (Lancashire Halloween 2009). Gothic Prague – The Evil Within was on for four nights.

Most Haunted Live! did not return for Halloween 2010 and was replaced by a new paranormal show called Paranormal Investigation: LIVE! which aired for two nights on Sky Living.

In 2011 it was reported that Living, who were now known as Sky Living, had chosen not to re-commission either Most Haunted or Most Haunted Live! but thanked both Yvette Fielding and her husband Karl Beattie for their hard work and commitment over the years.

Most Haunted Live returned after a five-year hiatus on Saturday 31 October 2015 on the UKTV channel "Really" for a Halloween special. The three and a half hour live event aired from 9.00pm-12.30am GMT on the Really channel which is available in the UK and Ireland on satellite and cable services, as well as Freeview in the UK. The one night live event came from an allegedly haunted house at 30 East Drive, Pontefract in West Yorkshire, England. The house was the scene for a previous investigation by the Most Haunted team for the series which aired a few weeks before this Halloween event. The team thought the house had a lot of paranormal activity, and it would merit being an ideal location for their first Most Haunted Live in five years.

The live event was hosted by Rylan Clark-Neal and Jamie East who presented from an outside broadcast unit and a small outside studio, with the usual members of the Most Haunted team present too, including Yvette Fielding, Karl Beattie and Stuart Torevell, the only three original members left of the Most Haunted Live team. The live event had the usual interaction from the general public who could tweet or Facebook in their comments and who could watch live streaming webcams from different areas in the house. Talk show host and personality Paul O'Grady joined the team in the investigation.

The event caused some controversy when it appeared that Karl Beattie was dragged up the stairs of the house by an "invisible" force. However reviewing back footage of the incident, many viewers and sceptics noted that Karl had what appeared to be a rope or cable around his waist which dragged him up the stairs. Karl and his wife Yvette dispute the claims that this was a faked incident, saying that the cable around Karl was just a camera lead. Karl would later make a YouTube video explaining the incident and answer sceptics' questions. The disappearance and later reappearance of a knife also caused concern, as many sceptics felt this was staged too. The Most Haunted team deny all claims of fakery or staged events during the Halloween live special.

It was confirmed by Yvette Fielding and the Really Channel that for Halloween 2016 there would not be a live event, but an "As Live" event to air on the UKTV Play platform, their on demand video site. On Monday 31 October 2016 from 9.00pm-11.00pm, Most Haunted will air an "as live" recorded edition of the show from HMP Shrewsbury on UKTV Play. The edition will have no edits and it will be a two-hour investigation recorded as live. The episode will also air on the Really Channel on Thursday 3 November 2016 at 10.00pm for those who could not see it on UKTV Play.

In a recorded promo for the upcoming Halloween special, Yvette said it will be two hours of "pure uncut Most Haunted terror", as Yvette and the team return to HMP Shrewsbury, a place where the team had investigated before in the previous series. It was a place where some unexplained paranormal activities had occurred including a crow bar being thrown and her husband Karl Beattie collapsing on the floor. She had said she never wanted to return there again, but for Halloween, she decided the location was perfect for another investigation.

The Live show returned on Hallowe'en night 2019 on the Most Haunted Official YouTube Channel, for a 3-hour event from Accrington Police Station and Courts.

== The team ==
This table shows a list of the current team members and their role in the live shows. Most of these are investigators and are part of the investigation team on location, whereas others are based in the hub.

Name	Function
Yvette Fielding	Presenter
Karl Beattie	Producer Director & Cameraman
Stuart Torevell	Rigger & Cameraman
Fred Batt	Demonologist & Historian
Glen Hunt	Sceptic
Darren Hutchinson	Technician

Arch Dyson was the editor in this Living TV series.

Following the return of the main show Most Haunted on a new freeview channel called Really (TV channel) in 2014, it was decided by Antix Productions that psychic mediums would not be used in the format. It is understood this will also follow through to the Most Haunted Live! episode on 31 October 2015.

== Format ==
The live events were based on specific paranormal themes, the two most common themes being Halloween and the summer solstice which are reputedly the two most paranormally active periods of the calendar. Some themes are based on well known historical figures such as Dick Turpin, William Shakespeare, Jack the Ripper and Dracula. Other themes include Pirates Curse a live event which took place over a weekend in May 2007. For Halloween 2007, the team embarked on a five night investigation. They traveled around the country in the shape of an inverted pentagram. For Halloween 2008, the Most Haunted Live team undertook a record seven night investigation in the Welsh town on Denbigh, investigating the disused Asylum in the village. A further seven night investigation is taking place over a week in January 2009 in Liverpool, where the team investigate each night a different aspect of the paranormal.

"The Hub", as it was known, was the centre of communications where the audience and main studio were set up. The presenters, Paul Ross and David Bull, historian, Lesley Smith followed by Dr John Callow, and 'demonologist' Fred Batt who resides in Capel, Surrey worked from the hub. He owned Caesars Nightclub in Streatham from 1994 to 2010. As did the interactive team and its leader, Julian Clegg. The hub was also the location of the gallery and production offices.

The show was fully interactive. There were usually four webcams running through the event which could be watched online. Viewers could also send emails and text messages to report their own experiences.

== Episodes ==
=== 2002 ===
#	Airdate	Location			Theme	Presenters David Bull (politician) & Yvette Fielding
1	31 October 2002	Dudley Castle	Dudley, West Midlands	(England)	Halloween	
2	22 December 2002	Dover Castle	Dover, Kent	(England)	Christmas	

=== 2003 ===
#	Airdate	Location			Theme	Presenters David Bull & Yvette Fielding
3	1 April 2003	Midland Grand Hotel @ St Pancras International	St Pancras, Greater London	(England)	Peril in St. Pancras	
4	21 June 2003	Woodchester Mansion	Gloucestershire	(England)	Summer Solstice	
5	31 October 2003	Beaulieu Abbey, Palace House,	Beaulieu, Hampshire	(England)	Halloween	
6	29 December 2003	Hampstead Heath, Spaniards Inn	London	(England)	on the trail of Dick Turpin	
6	30 December 2003	Epping Forest	Essex	(England)	on the trail of Dick Turpin	
6	31 December 2003 last day of 2003 @ New Year's Eve / 1 January 2004 @ New Year's Day	York Dungeon, Knavesmire	York	(England)	on the trail of Dick Turpin	

=== 2004 ===
#	Airdate	Location			Theme	Presenters David Bull & Yvette Fielding
7	28 February 2004	River Avon, Warwickshire, Falstaff Experience, Shakespeare's Birthplace, New Place, Anne Hathaway's Cottage	Stratford-Upon-Avon, Warwickshire	(England)	The life and loves of William Shakespeare	
7	29 February 2004	Hall's Croft, Clopton House and the Well, Church of the Holy Trinity, Stratford-upon-Avon, Stratford-upon-Avon Town Hall	Stratford-Upon-Avon, Warwickshire	(England)	The life and loves of William Shakespeare	
8	9 April 2004	Graveyard of St. Nicholas Church, Scots Hall Crossroads, The Anchor Inn	Canewdon, Essex	(England)	The Witch Finder General Matthew Hopkins of Essex	
8	10 April 2004	Seafield Bay, The White Hart, Manningtree Green	Manningtree, Essex	(England)	The Witch Finder General Matthew Hopkins of Essex	
8	11 April 2004	Mistley Towers, The Thorn Hotel, Mistley Pond, Hopping Bridge & Church Ruins	Mistley, Essex	(England)	The Witch Finder General Matthew Hopkins of Essex	
9	19 June 2004	House of John Flamsteed, Arbor Low, Derby Silk Mill, Ye Olde Dolphin Inne	Derby & Elvaston, Derbyshire	(England)	Summer Solstice	
9	20 June 2004	House of holes "Was Grand Theatre, Derby", Derby Gaol, Derby Blackfriars	Derby & Elvaston, Derbyshire	(England)	Summer Solstice	
9	21 June 2004	Elvaston Castle	Derby & Elvaston, Derbyshire	(England)	Summer Solstice	
10	30 October 2004	Clitheroe Castle, 2 Church Brow, Trinity Youth Centre	Clitheroe, Newchurch in Pendle, Lancashire	(England)	Pendle Hill @ Halloween	
10	31 October 2004	Lower WellHead Farm, Bull Hole Farm, Tynedale Farm	Clitheroe, Newchurch in Pendle, Lancashire	(England)	Pendle Hill @ Halloween	
10	1 November 2004	Waddow Hall, Peg O' Nells Well, Crag Woods	Clitheroe, Newchurch in Pendle, Lancashire	(England)	Pendle Hill @ Halloween	
11	12 December 2004	Blackpool Pleasure Beach	Blackpool, Lancashire	(England)	Christmas	
11	13 December 2004	Blackpool Tower & Tower Ball Room	Blackpool, Lancashire	(England)	Christmas	
11	14 December 2004	Winter Gardens, Blackpool & Opera House Theatre, Blackpool	Blackpool, Lancashire	(England)	Christmas	

=== 2005 ===
#	Airdate	Location			Theme	Presenters David Bull, Yvette Fielding & Paul Ross
12	12 March 2005	Lupton Hall	Brixham, Topsham, Devon, Berry Pomeroy, Devon	(England)	Terror in Torbay	
12	13 March 2005	The Globe Hotel, Brixham Heritage Museum, Smugglers Haunt Hotle	Brixham, Topsham, Devon, Berry Pomeroy, Devon	(England)	Terror in Torbay	
12	14 March 2005	Berry Pomeroy Castle	Brixham, Topsham, Devon, Berry Pomeroy, Devon	(England)	Terror in Torbay	
13	6 May 2005	Elstree Studios (Shenley Road)	Elstree, Hertfordshire	(England)	Nightmare on Elstree	
13	7 May 2005	Waggon and Horses Pub, Allum Hall, The Holybush Inn Pub is Gone "Now Known as Little Raccoons Day Nursery Elstree"	Elstree, Hertfordshire	(England)	Nightmare on Elstree	
13	8 May 2005	Gate Studios "Building Now Gone!"	Elstree, Hertfordshire	(England)	Nightmare on Elstree	
14	19 June 2005	Rutland Mills	Wakefield & Overton, West Yorkshire	(England)	The Darkness Begins (Summer Solstice)	
14	20 June 2005	Wakefield Theatre Royal & Opera House	Wakefield & Overton, West Yorkshire	(England)	The Darkness Begins (Summer Solstice)	
14	21 June 2005	National Coal Mining Museum for England	Wakefield & Overton, West Yorkshire	(England)	The Darkness Begins (Summer Solstice)	
15	2 September 2005	Staircase House	Market Place, Stockport, Stockport, Greater Manchester, Cheadle, Greater Manchester, Peter Street, Manchester, Manchester	(England)	Mayhem in Manchester	
15	3 September 2005	Barnes Hospital, Cheadle & The Morgue	Market Place, Stockport, Stockport, Greater Manchester, Cheadle, Greater Manchester, Peter Street, Manchester, Manchester	(England)	Mayhem in Manchester	
15	4 September 2005	Albert Hall, Manchester	Market Place, Stockport, Stockport, Greater Manchester, Cheadle, Greater Manchester, Peter Street, Manchester, Manchester	(England)	Mayhem in Manchester	
16	28 October 2005	Tower Bridge	Tower Hamlest, Southwark, Commercial Street, London, Spitalfields, Southwark, Whitechapel Road, East End, London	(England)	Eerie in the East End (Halloween) "Also Night 4 Featuring guset Star Paul O'Grady"	
16	29 October 2005	Commercial Tavern	Tower Hamlest, Southwark, Commercial Street, London, Spitalfields, Southwark, Whitechapel Road, East End, London	(England)	Eerie in the East End (Halloween) "Also Night 4 Featuring guset Star Paul O'Grady"	
16	30 October 2005	The Clink	Tower Hamlest, Southwark, Commercial Street, London, Spitalfields, Southwark, Whitechapel Road, East End, London	(England)	Eerie in the East End (Halloween) "Also Night 4 Featuring guset Star Paul O'Grady"	
16	31 October 2005	The Blind Beggar Pub & Commercial Street, London, Warehouse & Stable's	Tower Hamlest, Southwark, Commercial Street, London, Spitalfields, Southwark, Whitechapel Road, East End, London	(England)	Eerie in the East End (Halloween) "Also Night 4 Featuring guset Star Paul O'Grady"	
17	9 December 2005	Bluecoat Chambers	Liverpool	(England)	Mayhem on Merseyside (Christmas) "These were the first Live Episodes following Derek Acorah's departure".	
17	10 December 2005	The Wirral Museum	Liverpool	(England)	Mayhem on Merseyside (Christmas) "These were the first Live Episodes following Derek Acorah's departure".	
17	11 December 2005	Royal Court Theatre, Liverpool	Liverpool	(England)	Mayhem on Merseyside (Christmas) "These were the first Live Episodes following Derek Acorah's departure".	

=== 2006 ===
#	Airdate	Location			Theme	Presenters Yvette Fielding & Paul Ross
18	24 June 2006	Wymering Manor	Wymering, Portsea Island, HMNB Portsmouth	(England)	Panic In Portsmouth, Hampshire (Midsummer)	
18	25 June 2006	Southsea Castle	Wymering, Portsea Island, HMNB Portsmouth	(England)	Panic In Portsmouth, Hampshire (Midsummer)	
18	26 June 2006	Royal Marines Museum	Wymering, Portsea Island, HMNB Portsmouth	(England)	Panic In Portsmouth, Hampshire (Midsummer)	
19	29 October 2006	Blair Street Vaults	Edinburgh Vaults	(Scotland)	Edinburgh @ (Halloween)	
19	30 October 2006	Niddry Street Vaults	Edinburgh Vaults	(Scotland)	Edinburgh @ (Halloween)	
19	31 October 2006	Mary King's Close	Edinburgh Vaults	(Scotland)	Edinburgh @ (Halloween)	

=== 2007 ===
#	Airdate	Location			Theme
21	24 February 2007	Corvin Castle	Hunedoara	(Transylvania) , (Romania)	
	25 February 2007	Corvin Castle	Hunedoara	(Transylvania) , (Romania)	
22	5 May 2007	Blackbeard's House	Bristol	(England)	Pirates' Curse
	6 May 2007	Redcliffe Caves		(England)	
	7 May 2007	Llandoger Trow		(England)	
23	27 October 2007	Wheler Priory	Knutsford Cheshire	(England)	Halloween
23	28 October 2007	Leopard Inn	Knutsford Cheshire	(England)	Halloween
23	29 October 2007	Towneley Hall	Knutsford Cheshire	(England)	Halloween
23	30 October 2007	Bolsover Castle	Knutsford Cheshire	(England)	Halloween
23	31 October 2007	Plas Teg	Knutsford Cheshire	(England)	Halloween

=== 2008 ===
#	Airdate	Location			Theme
25	26 March 2008	San Pietro in Vincoli	Turin, Italy	(Italy)	Satan's City
25	27 March 2008	Lucedio Abbey Church & Priest's House	Turin, Italy	(Italy)	Satan's City
25	28 March 2008	Lucedio Abbey Monastery	Turin, Italy	(Italy)	Satan's City
25	29 March 2008	Pietro Micca Tunnels	Turin, Italy	(Italy)	Satan's City
25	30 March 2008	Moncalieri Castle	Turin, Italy	(Italy)	Satan's City
26	29 August 2008	London Tombs	London	(England)	Total Darkness
26	30 August 2008	Aldwych tube station	London	(England)	Total Darkness
26	31 August 2008	Churchill War Rooms	London	(England)	Total Darkness
27	25 October 2008	South East Wing	North Wales Hospital Denbigh Wales	(Wales)	Village of the Damned (Halloween)
27	26 October 2008	Staff' Quarters	North Wales Hospital Denbigh Wales	(Wales)	Village of the Damned (Halloween)
27	27 October 2008	South West Wing	North Wales Hospital Denbigh Wales	(Wales)	Village of the Damned (Halloween)
27	28 October 2008	Isolation Wards & Mortuary	North Wales Hospital Denbigh Wales	(Wales)	Village of the Damned (Halloween)
27	29 October 2008	North West Wing	North Wales Hospital Denbigh Wales	(Wales)	Village of the Damned (Halloween)
27	30 October 2008	Cellars	North Wales Hospital Denbigh Wales	(Wales)	Village of the Damned (Halloween)
27	31 October 2008	Chapel & Mortuary	North Wales Hospital Denbigh Wales	(Wales)	Village of the Damned (Halloween)

=== 2009 ===
#	Airdate	Location			Theme
28	10 January 2009	St. George's Hall (Night 1 - Poltergeists)	Liverpool, Merseyside	(England)	The Search For Evil
28	11 January 2009	Liverpool Empire Theatre (Night 2 - Apparitions)	Liverpool, Merseyside	(England)	The Search For Evil
28	12 January 2009	Stanley Dock (Night 3 - Lost Souls)	Liverpool, Merseyside	(England)	The Search For Evil
28	13 January 2009	Central Library (Night 4 - Voices from the Grave)	Liverpool, Merseyside	(England)	The Search For Evil
28	14 January 2009	Samlesbury Hall (Night 5 - Dark Phantoms)	Preston, Lancashire	(England)	The Search For Evil
28	15 January 2009	Bidston Hall (Night 6 - Night Terrors)	Birkenhead, Merseyside	(England)	The Search For Evil
28	16 January 2009	St. George's Hall Basement (Night 7 - Demons)	Liverpool, Merseyside	(England)	The Search For Evil
29	24 October 2009	Morecambe Winter Gardens (Night 1 - The Beast)	Lancashire	(England)	Eight Faces of Evil (Halloween)
29	25 October 2009	Palatine Hall (Night 2 - The Butcher)	Lancashire	(England)	Eight Faces of Evil (Halloween)
29	26 October 2009	Morecambe Antiques Centre & Carleton Nightclub (Night 3 - The Murderer)	Lancashire	(England)	Eight Faces of Evil (Halloween)
29	27 October 2009	Ashton Hall (Night 4 - The Jailer)	Lancashire	(England)	Eight Faces of Evil (Halloween)
29	28 October 2009	Judges Lodgings (Night 5 - The Judge)	Lancashire	(England)	Eight Faces of Evil (Halloween)
29	29 October 2009	The Three Mariners Inn & Ashton Memorial (Night 6 - The Sorcerer)	Lancashire	(England)	Eight Faces of Evil (Halloween)
29	30 October 2009	Lancaster Maritime Museum & Snatchems Golden Ball (Night 7 - The Smuggler)	Lancashire	(England)	Eight Faces of Evil (Halloween)
29	31 October 2009	Morecambe Winter Gardens & Gallows Hill (Night 8 - The Hanged Man)	Lancashire	(England)	Eight Faces of Evil (Halloween)

=== 2010 ===
#	Airdate	Location			Theme
30	9 January 2010	The Control Tower	RAF West Raynham, Norfolk	(England)	The Silent Town
30	10 January 2010	The Armoury & Hangar 3	RAF West Raynham, Norfolk	(England)	The Silent Town
30	11 January 2010	The Guards House and Chapel	RAF West Raynham, Norfolk	(England)	The Silent Town
30	12 January 2010	The Sargents Mess	RAF West Raynham, Norfolk	(England)	The Silent Town
30	13 January 2010	Station HQ	RAF West Raynham, Norfolk	(England)	The Silent Town
30	14 January 2010	The Officers Mess	RAF West Raynham, Norfolk	(England)	The Silent Town
30	15 January 2010	Hospital	RAF West Raynham, Norfolk	(England)	The Silent Town
31	25 March 2010	Old Town Hall Cellars (Night 1 - The Devil's Executioner)	Prague, Czech Republic	(Czech Republic)	Gothic Prague – The Evil Within
31	26 March 2010	Prague Waterworks (Night 2 - River's of Blood)	Prague, Czech Republic	(Czech Republic)	Gothic Prague – The Evil Within
31	27 March 2010	Křivoklát Castle (Night 3 - Satan's Alchemy)	Prague, Czech Republic	(Czech Republic)	Gothic Prague – The Evil Within
31	28 March 2010	Houska Castle ( Night 4 - End of Days)	Prague, Czech Republic	(Czech Republic)	Gothic Prague – The Evil Within

=== 2015 ===
Most Haunted Live returned in 2015 for its first live special since 2010. The live elements were presented by Rylan Clark and Jamie East. Paul O'Grady appeared as a guest at the event. The event was broadcast on the UKTV channel Really and aired on 31 October 2015 from 9.00pm-12.30am GMT. The event came from 30 East Drive, Pontefract in West Yorkshire, England.

#	Airdate	Location			Theme
32	31 October 2015	30 East Drive	Pontefract, West Yorkshire	(England)	Nightmare on East Drive (Halloween)

=== 2016 ===
Following the 2015 live, the team aired a 2-hour long 2016 Halloween special in the style of a Most Haunted Live, except it was not live. Titled 'Most Haunted As Live', the 2-hour special came from HM Prison Shrewsbury. The show was unedited and uncut, showing the Most Haunted team returning to one of their most frightening paranormal locations to date.

The 2-hour long special was exclusively released on UKTV Play on 31 October 2016 and was aired on 3 November 2016 on Really.

#	Airdate (UKTV Play)	Airdate (Really)	Location			Theme
33	31 October 2016	3 November 2016	HMP Shrewsbury	Shrewsbury, Shropshire	(England)	As Live (Halloween)

=== 2019 ===
Most Haunted Live returned on 30 June 2019 exclusive to the Most Haunted Official YouTube channel.

#	Airdate	Location			Theme
34	30 June 2019	Codnor Castle Farmhouse	Codnor, Derbyshire	(England)	Annabelle Special
35	31 October 2019	Accrington Old Police Station & Courts	Accrington, Lancashire	(England)	Halloween

=== 2020 ===
Following the COVID-19 Pandemic, a Most Haunted Live Special was presented at Accrington Courts where the Team speak about 2019's Halloween Live Special & showing a present 'As Live' footage at Accrington Courts unedited and uncut. Then followed with a few members of the team, sharing their memories of experience of the franchise of Most Haunted, with guest interviews & then followed by a feature-length episode of the planned secret location that was filmed before the Covid Pandemic. After the episode there were more interviews from the team about their experience at the secret location.

The 5 Hour special was exclusively released on YouTube.

#	Airdate	Location			Theme
36	31 October 2020	Accrington Courts	Accrington, Lancashire, & Woolton Hall, Liverpool Merseyside	(England)	Halloweek

=== 2021 ===
Following the ongoing COVID-19 Pandemic, the Team returned with an audience since its last in Accrington in 2019.

The almost 3 Hour special was exclusively released on YouTube.

#	Airdate	Location			Theme
37	31 October 2021	Botanic Gardens Museum	Southport, Merseyside	(England)	Halloween

=== 2022 ===
Most Haunted Live returned for a Halloween special, broadcast live from Delapré Abbey in Northamptonshire. The three hour live investigation was streamed live on the Most Haunted Official YouTube channel on Halloween night of Monday 31 October 2022 from 9pm G.M.T.

=== Most Haunted Live! USA 2007 ===
#	USA Airdate	UK Airdate ('Almost Live')	Location		Theme
1	1 June 2007	25 December 2007	Eastern State Penitentiary	Philadelphia, Pennsylvania	Death Row
2	19 October 2007	8 February 2008	Winchester Mystery House	San Jose, California	Mystery House
