= Most Haunted =

British television series

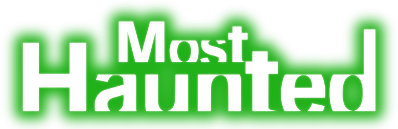
- Genre: Paranormal reality Entertainment
- Created by: Yvette Fielding; Karl Beattie
- Directed by: Karl Beattie
- Presented by: Yvette Fielding
- Starring: Yvette Fielding; Karl Beattie; Glen Hunt; Stuart Torevell; Gregg Smith
- Narrated by: Yvette Fielding
- Opening theme: Most Haunted
- Composer: Alan Clark
- Country of origin: United Kingdom
- Original language: English
- No. of series: 25
- No. of episodes: 329 (list of episodes)

Production
- Executive producers: Yvette Fielding; Karl Beattie
- Producer: Karl Beattie
- Cinematography: Stuart Torevell
- Camera setup: Multi-camera
- Running time: 30 minutes (Series 1); 45 minutes (Series 2–); 90–210 minutes (specials)
- Production company: Antix Productions

Original release
- Network: Living
- Release: 25 May 2002 – 21 July 2010
- Network: Really
- Release: 21 August 2014 – 11 January 2019
- Network: Pluto TV
- Release: 15 May 2026 – present

Related
- Most Haunted Live! Ghosthunting With...

Most Haunted is a British paranormal reality television series.

Most Haunted was first shown on Living TV between 2002 and 2010. However, it has since been revived on Really and online, via an official mobile app and YouTube Channel. Presented by Yvette Fielding, the programme investigates purported paranormal activity in a range of locations, mainly within the United Kingdom. The series was produced by Antix Productions.

After four years off-air, Fielding and Karl Beattie, the producer of the programme, confirmed that, following a successful online episode, Most Haunted would be returning to screens in August 2014, aired by Really.

In July 2019, Beattie announced that Really would no longer be making new episodes of Most Haunted. However, repeats of previous series on Really will continue to air occasionally on the channel. Most Haunted new episodes, live events, and new extra content, including outtakes and behind the scenes material, will continue to be produced, and these will now air on the official Most Haunted YouTube channel to an international audience. A new channel is being sought by Antix Productions to air the new series. However, until this channel is found, all new material from Most Haunted will now be available on its YouTube channel.

Over 300 episodes of the programme have been broadcast to date.

== Cancellation and revival ==
On 12 August 2011 it was announced that Sky Living had officially axed Most Haunted and had returned the rights to the show to Yvette Fielding and Karl Beattie.

In 2012, it was revealed that Antix Productions partnered with Lionsgate to redevelop Most Haunted.

In July 2013, Karl Beattie began scouting new locations for a new series of Most Haunted.

In April 2014, Yvette Fielding confirmed in an interview with Channel 4's Sunday Brunch that Most Haunted would be returning to television in late 2014; this was later confirmed on 4 June 2014. It was later confirmed that Really would be the new home of Most Haunted.

Really ended its partnership with Most Haunted in the summer of 2019, with the new owners of Really, Discovery, Inc. deciding to concentrate on importing American paranormal programming rather than the British-based Most Haunted.

Most Haunted moved its new content onto its new YouTube channel, which aired new Most Haunted material, shorter Most Haunted episodes, weekly live streams with Karl, Yvette, and Mary Beattie, and also live events at Halloween and other times. Contrary to opening captions on broadcast versions of the programme, current episodes now display opening wording stressing the Most Haunted team stand by the findings of their investigations (as YouTube have no rules or regulations on the legitimacy of paranormal content on the platform, unlike OFCOM).

== Production ==
The Most Haunted team has travelled not only in the United Kingdom but also Ireland, the Netherlands, Romania, the United States, Italy, and the Czech Republic, investigating paranormal activity for 24 hours at a time.

=== Photography ===
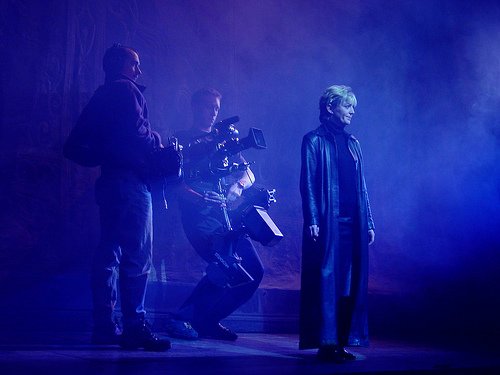
Presenter Yvette Fielding during filming on Series one

The photographic style of the series has changed considerably since Series 1. In the first series, many elaborate shots were set up in an almost "theatrical" style, with illuminated windows and dry ice. Locations were often illuminated outside at night with blue and green lights. There was a high emphasis on quality production. From series 1–3, there was extensive use of the Steadicam, which provided gliding shots during Yvette's ghostly tales or for general views. In series 8, the team introduced a camera crane, or 'jib' system, for elaborate aerial shots of both Yvette and the locations. Most of the photography in Most Haunted focuses on "general views," also known as "GV's," of a location and its surroundings.

Most Haunted was filmed with both broadcast Sony DSR-570WSP & DSR-PD170P DVCAM cameras and Sony DCR-PC9E miniDV cameras. A thermal imaging camera was also used to detect and highlight cold and warm spots. The style of the series changed somewhat after series five, losing its Most Haunted grungy look as it became more mainstream.

=== Music ===
Most Haunted's music was originally composed for the picture by Alan Clark, using his own original sounds and samples and including some from the Spectrasonics sample libraries: Distorted Reality, Metamorphosis, and Biazzare Guitar. As of series 12, Clark's music has been supplemented with additional stock music, which was also used on the now defunct Unexplained Channel programme, Rest in Peace. Living TV also released a CD featuring Clark's music remixed and original material written and produced by composer and producer Steve Deakin-Davies (The Official Most Haunted Soundtrack Vol 1: The Ambition Company/Solo MH104)

== On-screen team ==
Between series 1 and series 15, Most Haunted featured a main presenter, a historian, a psychic medium, and a parapsychologist.

Essentially, the latter two are intended to create an even balance between paranormal and scientific explanations for the various phenomena that occur. Any information provided by the medium from claimed interactions with spirits is then analyzed by the historian to see if it can be verified. The core investigation team are supported by some of the production crew, who appear in the show and are generally involved with the investigation whilst performing their normal crew role. Most of these on-screen crew members also take part in séances.

From series 16, Antix Productions decided to remove psychic mediums from the format of the show.

Name	Role	Duration
Yvette Fielding	Presenter	2002–2011, 2013–
Karl Beattie	Producer, Director & Cameraman	2002–2011, 2013–
Stuart Torevell	Rigger, Director of Photography & Cameraman	2002–2011, 2013–
Fred Batt	Demonologist & Historian	2010–2011, 2013–
Gregg Smith	Cameraman	2015–
Glen Hunt	Sceptic	2015–
Darren Hutchinson	Soundman	2014–
Mary Beattie	Yvette and Karl's daughter. Paranormal Investigator	2018–

Some episodes have also included at least one celebrity. So far, the celebrity guests have included Vic Reeves, Nancy Sorrell, Gaby Roslin, Scott Mills, Mark Chapman, Simon Gregson, Sue Cleaver, Carol Thatcher, Paul O'Grady, and Lee Ryan. For the series 10 episode from Coalhouse Fort, the team were joined by Scottish paranormal investigator Ryan O'Neill, and series 15 saw Bullet for My Valentine join the team on an investigation.

=== Former mediums ===
Between series 1 and series 14, a medium accompanied the team on their investigations. The mediums were as follows:

- Derek Acorah (Series 1–6: 2001–2005)
- David Wells (Series 4–8 & 9: 2004–2007)
- Gordon Smith (Series 7, 8: 2005–2006)
- Brian Shepherd (Series 4, 5: Series 10–13: 2008)
- Chris Conway (Series 14, 15: 2009)

The show has also featured guest mediums. So far, these have been Ian Lawman, Ian Shillito, Uri Geller, Rochford's clairvoyant Kevin Wade, American-born Johnnie Fiori, Barrie John, Liverpool native Billy Roberts, and American-born Patrick Mathews.

It was decided for series 15 onwards that psychic mediums would not be used in the format.

=== Former team members ===
Name	Role	Years
Jason Karl	Parapsychologist	2002
Catherine Howe	Hair & Make-Up Artist	2003–2011
Phil Whyman	Paranormal Investigator	2002–2004, 2009–2010
Richard Felix	Historian	2003–2006
Ciarán O'Keeffe	Parapsychologist	2004–2010
Matthew Smith	Parapsychologist	2002–2005
Steven Parsons	Paranormal Investigator	2006–2007
Chris Burton	Director of Photography & Cameraman	2007–2011, 2013–2014
Lesley Smith	Historian	2006–2009
Melanie Crump	Hair & Make-Up Artist	2013–2014
John Callow	Historian & Sceptic	2009 & 2014
Leah Walton	Hair & Make-Up Artist	2015
Eamonn Vann-Harris	Electronic Researcher	2015–2017

== Series ==
For main article on individual episodes, see: List of Most Haunted episodes

This section outlines changes across the 23 series of Most Haunted, with detailed look at major changes through the programme's original run (series 1–14), broadcast on Living and a brief series overviews and filming location lists of the revival series (15–23), broadcast on Really.

Time slot

- Series 1: Tuesdays at 8:30pm on Living
- Series 2–13 Tuesdays at 9:00pm on Living
- Series 14: Wednesdays at 10.00pm on Living
- Series 16–17: Thursdays at 10:00pm on Really
- Series 18: Sundays at 10:00pm on Really
- Series 19: Thursdays at 10:00pm on Really
- Series 20–22: Fridays at 10:00pm on Really
- Series 23: Daily at 10:00pm on Really
- Series 24: Fridays at 9:00pm on Really

=== Series 1–3 (2002–2003) ===
Known as Most Haunted with Yvette Fielding and Derek Acorah (This title was used until series 6)

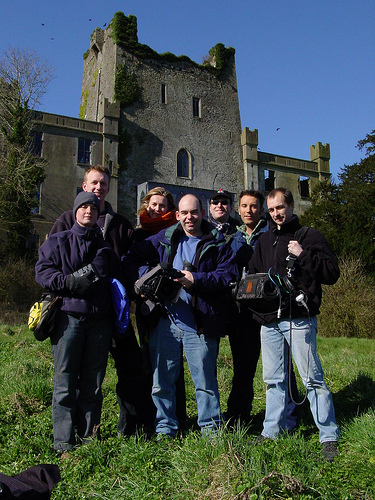
The film crew for the first series, including guest Jason Karl (back, right)

The first series began on 25 May 2002. Each episode had a duration of 30 minutes. However, reruns of these episodes have been re-edited to the full hour and titled Most Haunted Unseen. Added footage in these episodes is shown with a caption in the corner to distinguish it from the original version. The series concluded with an investigation of Michelham Priory on 17 September 2002, which was coincidentally the first episode to be produced. In the eighth series the team revisited this location to mark the 100th episode. During the break in series, the team aired three live investigations, the third of which led into the second series on 8 April 2003. From this point onwards episodes were accompanied by a supplemental Most Haunted Extra. At this point, Extra was available as a ten-minute feature after the main show, accessible to viewers via the red button. For Series two and three, Phil Whyman joined the show as a paranormal investigator, replacing the original investigator Jason Karl, as well as guest investigators David Scanlan and Vicki Purewal, who left at the end of the first series. The show remained unchanged at this point until Series 4.

=== Series 4–6 (Derek Acorah departure and revamp) ===
The fourth series commenced on 23 March 2004 with an investigation of Owlpen Manor. Most Haunted Extra became a 30-minute programme, broadcast for half an hour after the main show on LivingTV. This series was the first series in which guest mediums joined the team during the investigations. This took some of the pressure off Derek Acorah who had been the only medium in the first three series. The main guest mediums involved during this series were Salisbury native Brian Shepherd, David Wells and Scunthorpe's Ian Lawman.

Series five commenced on 14 September 2004. It was preceded by a 3 night Most Haunted Live! investigation advertised as a countdown to the series. Phil Whyman was replaced with (although he recently returned on the Live shows as a studio expert), then semi-regular, Ciarán O'Keeffe. Originally O'Keeffe viewed the footage recorded during the investigations and analysed it, putting forward his own views and opinions, which usually included suggestions as to other possible causes for the phenomena encountered. He shared this role with his colleague Matthew Smith who frequently attended the early Most Haunted Live events. Following the departure of Phil Whyman after Series 4, O'Keeffe began to join the team on location. Yvette's brother Rick Fielding also left the show at the end of Series 4.

At the end of Series 5, Antix Productions began editing the series in-house at their own production offices. Prior to this, post-production had been completed at 422 Manchester. As a result, the series lost its original editor who had worked on Most Haunted since the first episode and all of the vintage film composite effects which resulted in a considerable change to the editing style and look of the programme.

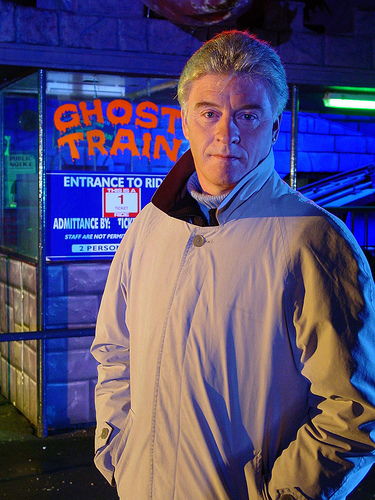
Derek Acorah in series 1

For series six, beginning on 22 March 2005 with an investigation of Bodmin Gaol, David Wells became one of the main mediums alongside Derek Acorah appearing in every episode. This was Derek Acorah's last Most Haunted series owing to the controversy he was involved in during its production which cast doubt on his ability to perform his role. As such he did not appear in the final episode at Sinai House. The number of episodes for Series 6 was originally intended to be 18, with the last 11 being part of Series 7. Due to Acorah's departure, the series was extended. This was the first series in which the team conducted 24-hour investigations over in the USA. Acorah didn't return for the show's finale at Sinai House when David Wells was the main medium.

=== Series 7–9 (Spin-offs and cast changes) ===
The seventh series began on 1 November 2005 yet only ran for six weeks, shortened from an intended nine. Two of the final three episodes (at Bamburgh Castle and Chambercombe Manor) were broadcast at the end of Series 8 and the last, at Spitbank Fort, was broadcast as special on Boxing Day 2006. Parapsychologist Louie Savva a regular on the Most Haunted Live! events joined the team for a few of the investigations in this series covering shows which O'Keeffe was unable to take part in.

Series eight began on 27 June 2006 with the 100th investigation and a revisit to Michelham Priory. It marked the last appearance of Richard Felix as the resident historian. He was not replaced until the tenth series. This series featured guest mediums Gordon Smith, Ian Lawman, Ian Shillito of Braintree, Essex and Kevin Wade.

An investigation of South Stack Lighthouse began the ninth series on 2 January 2007. Four episodes into the series, new episodes became known as New Most Haunted in television listings and on-screen. This is the last series of Most Haunted where Most Haunted Extra accompanied each episode. After the first few episodes, Extra was moved to Living2. Most Haunted Extra last appeared accompanying Most Haunted: Midsummer Murders. This was the last series to feature David Wells as a regular medium on the show.

=== Series 10: Midsummer Murders ===
The 10th series was given the tagline Midsummer Murders and was an eight-part series where Most Haunted investigators attempted to solve murder mysteries in normal English villages. It was hosted by Most Haunted historian Lesley Smith. The series commenced on a weekly broadcast from 19 June 2007 to 31 July 2007 and the team visited (in order of broadcast) Stoney Middleton, Nantwich, Castleton, Pluckley, Ruthin, Tutbury, Tarvin, and Bakewell. An episode, shot in Lymm Village, saw the team investigate a suspect of Jack the Ripper. This episode was not aired on television. Most Haunted: Midsummer Murders was never released on DVD.

=== Series 11 (The new investigator years) ===
The 11th series of Most Haunted began on 19 February 2008 and came to a close at the end of April. This series featured three psychic mediums: Johnnie Fiori, Nottingham native Barrie John and Brian Shepherd. Lesley Smith replaced Richard Felix as the resident historian on the recorded shows and travelled with the team to each location. The team were also joined by Scottish paranormal investigator Ryan O'Neill, a guest on episodes 1&2 of series 10 at Coalhouse Fort. In the Coalhouse Fort episodes of the show, an American psychic joined the team and claimed to have encountered the spirits of a bespectacled old man and his "gawky" son in the museum of the fort, who had been responsible for compiling the collection. The team allegedly picked up the voice and moaning from the old man later in the night. The psychic also claimed that there were spirits of animals in the fort, perhaps from horses who had been involved in its construction and claimed to have encountered the spirit of a pilot named Jeff and other air force men around the fort who had been there during World War I. She also claimed that in one area of the fort she picked up macabre images of debauchery and sodomy where sexual favours were performed in return for food and money, also from World War I. The team also apparently picked up countless examples of poltergeist activity in the fort with the unexplained throwing of stones, knocking and the occasional moaning, responses from taunts by the team for the ghosts to make their presence known.

=== Series 12, 13 (Most Haunted USA) & 14 ===
Alternating between series 12 and 13, Living broadcast on an episode from series 12 followed the following week with an episode from Season 13 also known as Most Haunted USA. Series 14 aired in 2010 featuring 10 episodes with the opening episode at Speke Hall.

=== Series 15 (Final series on Living) ===
Series 15 started on 12 May 2010, with an investigation into Berkeley Castle and continue to show every Wednesday on Living at 22:00 BST. The series ended on Wednesday 21 July 2010. The series was made up of 10 episodes concluding with a two-parter at Weald & Downland Museum, Singleton, West Sussex.

=== DVD - Exclusive DVD episode, 2011 (stand alone investigation) ===
A new episode of Most Haunted was released exclusively to DVD on 12 December 2011. This investigation was based at The Rifles Museum in Salisbury, England

=== Hiatus (2011–2014) ===
Most Haunted ended in 2010, with the showing of repeats by LivingTV ending in 2011. In 2010, Freeview channel Sky 3 (later Pick TV, now Pick) began showing the repeats. This continued until 2016.

Following the initial axing by LivingTV, Karl Beattie began a fan campaign to get the show back on the air. Most Haunted returned with a Christmas DVD special from The Rifles Museum in Salisbury. Later, three episodes from The Royal Court Theatre, Bacup, England produced and aired initially online then sold to Really TV as a single episode..

=== Series 16 (Revival on Really, new set up 2014) ===
It was announced on 4 June, that Most Haunted would return to TV in August 2014 with a new 10-part series to air on the Freeview channel, Really. Yvette Fielding returned to the show along with Karl Beattie. Former team members Stuart Torevell and Fred Batt also returned. Welsh heavy metal band Bullet for My Valentine appeared in an episode of the show.

Yvette Fielding was interviewed on the James Whale Show, discussing the current show and her reasons for not using mediums in the new series of Most Haunted.

Series 16 Episode List

1. The Royal Court Theatre, Bacup
2. Newton House (Part 1 (Special Guest Bullet for My Valentine)
3. Newton House (Part 2 (Special Guest Bullet for My Valentine)
4. The Galleries of Justice
5. Delapré Abbey (Special Guest England Rugby Team)
6. The National Emergency Services Museum
7. Ye Olde Kings Head, Chester
8. Drakelow Tunnels
9. Saltmarshe Hall (Part 1)
10. Saltmarshe Hall (Part 2)

=== Series 17 (Mid-2015) ===
Most Haunted aired its 17th series from June to July 2015.

1. Tivoli Theatre - North Wales
2. Tatton Old Hall - Cheshire
3. Annisons Funeral Parlor - Hull
4. Fort Paull - Yorkshire (Part 1)
5. Fort Paull - Yorkshire (Part 2)
6. Wentworth Woodhouse (Part 1)
7. Wentworth Woodhouse (Part 2)
8. Oakwell House
9. Knottingley Town Hall
10. Capesthorne Hall - Cheshire

=== Series 18 (Late–2015) ===
Most Haunted aired its 18th series from October to December 2015. The series features Most Haunted's first live broadcast since 2010, as a 3 1/2 hour Halloween special on 31 October 2015, which took place at 30 East Drive, Pontefract - the home of The Black Monk. The Halloween special attracted 543,000 viewers, giving Really its largest audience in the channel's history.

1. 30 East Drive (Part 1)
2. 30 East Drive (Part 2)
3. Most Haunted Live - Halloween Special (at 30 East Drive)
4. Thackray Medical Museum
5. Armley Mills
6. Carr House
7. Hill House (Part 1)
8. Hill House (Part 2)
9. Village Church Farm House
10. Old Nick Theatre
11. The Black Country Museum

=== Series 19 (2016) ===
Most Haunted aired its 19th series from June to September 2016. Series 19 included a "Huge" three-part Investigation at a former prison, HMP Shrewsbury; as well as a two-hour Halloween special which also took place at HMP Shrewsbury and was broadcast on 3 November 2016.

1. Lyceum Theatre
2. Whittington Castle
3. Halsham House
4. Mansion House Care Home
5. Walton Hall
6. Oak House
7. Middleton Hall
8. HMP Shrewsbury (Part 1)
9. HMP Shrewsbury (Part 2)
10. HMP Shrewsbury (Part 3)
11. Halloween Special (HMP Shrewsbury)

=== Series 20 (Mid–2017) ===
Most Haunted aired its 20th Series from 14 April to 16 June 2017.

1. Abbey House Museum
2. Wentworth Woodhouse Stables
3. The Slaughter House
4. Todmorden Church
5. Weir Mill
6. Ripon Workhouse
7. Ripon Old Prison
8. Standon Hall (Part 1)
9. Standon Hall (Part 2)
10. Standon Hall (Part 3)

=== Series 21 (Halloween week) ===
Most Haunted aired its 21st Series from 27 October to 24 November 2017.

1. Rowley's House
2. The Fleece Inn
3. Haden Hill House (Part 1)
4. Haden Hill House (Part 2)
5. Croxteth Hall (Part 1) ('As' Live special)
6. Croxteth Hall (Part 2)
7. The Old House
8. The Keighley Bus Museum
9. The Judges' Lodgings (Part 1)
10. The Judges' Lodgings (Part 2)

=== Series 22 (Early 2018) ===
Most Haunted aired its 22nd Series from January to March 2018. The series consists of four two-part investigations, two single-part investigations, and an "As Live" special (as part of one of the two-part investigations).

1. Birmingham Central Lock-Up
2. Llanfyllin Workhouse Pt 1
3. Llanfyllin Workhouse Pt 2
4. Beaumanor Hall Part 1
5. Beaumanor Hall Part 2
6. Dudley Castle
7. Codnor Castle Cottage Part 1 (90-minute 'As Live' special)
8. Codnor Castle Cottage Part 2 (45-minute 'As Live' special)
9. Moat House Part 1
10. Moat House Part 2

=== Series 23 (Halloween 2018) ===
For Halloween 2018, Really TV presented 13 nights of paranormal programming, which included Series 23 of Most Haunted. Instead of airing the series each week, Really TV aired the whole series of ten consecutive nights from Friday 19 October 2018 until Sunday 28 October 2018.

1. Ashwell Prison (As Live) Special Part 1
2. Ashwell Prison (As Live) Special Part 2
3. Bate Inn Part 1
4. Bate Inn Part 2
5. Ruthin Castle Part 1
6. Ruthin Castle Part 2
7. Ancient High House
8. The Leopard Inn Part 1
9. The Leopard Inn Part 2
10. The Leopard Inn Part 3

=== Series 24 (2019) (final series on Really) ===
On Saturday 29 December 2018, Karl Beattie confirmed on Twitter that a new series of Most Haunted would start airing on Friday 11 January 2019 on Really, starting with an "As Live" special from Eden Camp in Yorkshire. Karl also confirmed that a former member of the team would be joining them for an investigation and a new team member would be joining them in this series.

Most Haunted's 24th series aired on Really from Friday 11 January 2019 and ran for 10 episodes. The new series aired at the earlier time of 9.00pm. Shortly after the premiere on Really, the whole series was made available on the channel's on-demand service, UKTV Play.

The 24th series would be the last series to air on Really TV.

1. Eden Camp Museum (As-Live) Pt. 1(2-hour special)
2. Eden Camp Museum (As-Live) Pt. 2
3. Antwerp Mansion
4. Hodroyd Hall Pt. 1
5. Hodroyd Hall Pt. 2
6. Hodroyd Hall Pt. 3
7. Kelham Hall Pt. 1
8. Kelham Hall Pt. 2
9. Guys Cliffe House Pt. 1
10. Guys Cliffe House Pt. 2

== Spin Offs ==
=== Most Haunted: Recurring Nightmares ===
In Most Haunted: Recurring Nightmares, the presenters recall their most frightening visits.

=== Most Haunted USA ===
Most Haunted USA was an eight-part mini-series that aired on the American Travel Channel from 12 December 2008 to 30 January 2009. The series has also aired in the UK and includes the team's investigation at the famous Waverly Hills Sanitorium in Kentucky. It aired as part of Series 11 in the UK.

=== Most Haunted: The Live Series ===
In January 2010, Most Haunted returned for a spin-off of the live shows. These episodes differed from the previous live shows in that they were more like a series investigation, but broadcast live. The series was broadcast every Saturday night and ran for 8 weeks, with each episode lasting two hours.

=== Most Haunted: Top Ten Scariest Moments ===
Top Ten Scariest Moments was a part-mini series that consists of 10 45-minute episodes, that was broadcast on Really and is still available to watch through UKTV Play, Really's on demand service.^{[note 1]} The series features Yvette recalling her scariest moments from past series. A slightly shortened edit of the episode from which that moment was from is then shown. Included in the online series was 10-minute discussion featuring Yvette and Glen Hunt, the resident sceptic, on "the elephant in the room" after the investigation at the Wentworth Woodhouse Stable Block as to whether the footage of the 'Wentworth Ghost' was faked.

== Controversy ==
On several occasions the former spiritualist medium Derek Acorah was supposedly possessed by an entity, sometimes evil or sometimes "lost and confused". Two such cases exposed Acorah. Before the filming, Acorah had been fed misinformation twice about the non-existent ghosts of Kreed Kafer and Rik Eedles by the show parapsychologist Ciarán O'Keeffe. During the investigations, later broadcast, Acorah presented the information as fact and even behaved as though being possessed by the fictional ghosts. O'Keeffe later revealed in the Daily Mirror that Kreed Kafer and Rik Eedles were anagrams of 'Derek Faker' and 'Derek Lies'. Even though O'Keeffe exposed Acorah, the paper also claimed that O'Keeffe had exposed the rest of the Most Haunted team. O'Keeffe later reported that he had been grossly misquoted and misrepresented in the article, and produced a response outlining his version of the show based on his observations and findings, saying he had exposed Derek Acorah and not the entirety of Most Haunted. The show's presenter, Yvette Fielding, said in an interview that she believes it was a fake possession.

The show was reported in 2005 to Ofcom relating to Derek Acorah. Ofcom described the show as one "where techniques are used which mean the audience is not necessarily in full possession of the facts". Ofcom ruled that this was not fraud because Most Haunted is an entertainment show, not a legitimate investigation into the paranormal, and should not be taken seriously.

Although not mentioned by O'Keeffe, the Mirror article also brought into question unedited footage which appeared to show Yvette Fielding and Karl Beattie faking 'paranormal' occurrences such as ghostly bumps and knocks. Fielding denied these claims; Beattie did not comment.

== Notes ==
Note 1.Available on UKTV Play as of 25 March 2018
