= Derek Acorah =

English television personality (1950–2020)

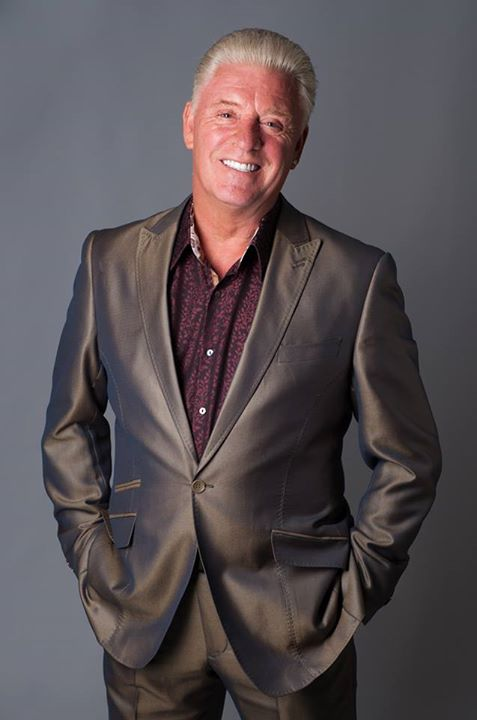
- Acorah in 2013
- Born: Derek Francis Johnson; 27 January 1950; Bootle, Lancashire, England
- Died: 4 January 2020 (aged 69); Scarisbrick, Lancashire, England
- Occupations: Spiritual medium; author; TV celebrity
- Known for: Most Haunted; Derek Acorah's Ghost Towns
- Spouses: Joan Hughes (m. 1972; div. 1982) Gwen Johnson (m. 1995)
- Children: 1

Derek Francis Johnson (27 January 1950 – 4 January 2020), known professionally as Derek Acorah, was a British spiritual medium. He was best known for his television work on Most Haunted, broadcast on Living TV (2002–2010). His career as a medium was punctuated by allegations of fakery and controversy over a number of seances during which he reportedly made contact with high-profile figures.

Before his career as a medium, Acorah played as a footballer, and was once on the books of Liverpool, but his career was cut short by injury.

== Early life and football career ==
Acorah was born Derek Francis Johnson on 27 January 1950 in Bootle to merchant sailor Frederick Johnson and Elizabeth Courtney. He lived in Scarisbrick near Southport, in North West England. Acorah claimed that his first experience with spiritualism happened when he was six, when he said he saw his deceased grandfather in his grandmother's house. His grandmother, a psychic, would later influence his decision to become a medium.

Acorah attended secondary school at Warwick Bolam, and was a keen footballer in his youth, firstly playing for Bootle Boys and then, Wrexham's academy side when he was thirteen. He signed schoolboy terms with Liverpool, at the time managed by Bill Shankly. Acorah often told of a story where he told Emlyn Hughes to be careful with his new car. When Hughes turned up late for training the next day, having written the car off, Shankly had heard of Acorah's mediumship and told him, "Son, where did you get all this from? You leave that at home, you just bring your boots here and play football." Acorah also claimed that he had spoken to Shankly in the spirit world, in the years following the Scotsman's death.

Acorah never made an appearance for the first team, and briefly turned out for the reserves, before being released by his hometown club. He returned to Wrexham, where he played for about a season, and had stints for Glentoran and Stockport County. After the birth of his son, he was asked by the players' union in Manchester if he wanted to play in Australia. He discussed the situation with his wife, and they made the move, where he played for USC Lion in the South Australian State League. His time at the club was cut short by injury, putting an end to his football career. On top of this, his wife suffered from homesickness, so they returned to England, but they split up soon afterwards. He then began working as a medium, adopting the surname Acorah, which he claimed came from a Dutch ancestor.

== Career ==
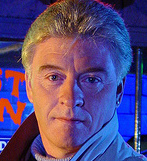
Derek Acorah in "Most Haunted"

Acorah's first television appearance was on the satellite TV channel Granada Breeze in 1996. During his five years with the channel, he began with Livetime before later appearing weekly on Psychic Livetime. He also appeared on Predictions which started out as a showcase for various studio guests but later became a vehicle for Acorah alone and renamed Predictions with Derek Acorah.

In 2002, Acorah also featured in the television series Antiques Ghost Show, and in 2004 he was presented with the Variety Club of Great Britain's Multichannel TV Personality of the Year Award.

=== Most Haunted ===
In July 2001, Acorah joined a new British television programme called Haunting Truths. It was subsequently sold to Living and renamed Most Haunted. He worked on the show for six series.

Yvette Fielding, a presenter and executive producer of Most Haunted, initially stated "there is no acting on this programme, none whatsoever. Everything you see and you hear is real." However, significant media attention was directed at the show in 2005, after Acorah claimed to channel spirits with names that had allegedly been suggested to him in advance, those names being "Rik Eedles" and "Kreed Kafer", anagrams of "Derek Lies" and "Derek Faker". These names were created by the show's then-resident sceptic and parapsychologist Ciarán O'Keeffe in a successful attempt to expose Acorah.

Speaking in 2006, Fielding said of Acorah: "We tell people everything is real, then it turns out he was a fake, so he had to go". His time on the show saw him regularly being parodied, most notably with Shirley Ghostman (portrayed by Marc Wootton), which drew on elements of Acorah and Colin Fry, and Wootton once invaded one of Acorah's shows. He was also parodied by Dawn French on an episode of French and Saunders, by Jon Culshaw on Dead Ringers and by Hugh Laurie on Saturday Night Live. Alex Lowe has speculated that Clinton Baptiste, the character he played in Phoenix Nights was based on Acorah, citing the similar hair colour and style.

=== Other appearances ===
After his 2005 departure from Most Haunted, Acorah filmed a one-off special for LivingTV, Derek Acorah's Quest for Guy Fawkes followed by Derek Acorah's Ghost Towns with Ruggie Media. This programme ran for three series. In 2008, Acorah took part in two series for Sky Real Lives titled Derek Acorah. In July 2006, he made a cameo appearance in the Doctor Who episode "Army of Ghosts".

In November 2009, Acorah featured in Michael Jackson: The Live Seance, in which he was shown on live television attempting to contact the singer's spirit. The programme was named the worst TV programme of 2009 in a poll of more than 9,000 Yahoo! users.

Acorah's other television work includes Celebrity Five Go to..., Harry Hill's TV Burp, Celebrity Quitters and Paranormal Egypt. He also made appearances on Celebrity Juice, Loose Lips, Richard and Judy, Bo' Selecta!, Brainiac: Science Abuse, The Paul O'Grady Show, The Weakest Link and Loose Women. On film, he had a cameo in Big Fat Gypsy Gangster (2011), and played a small role in Crispy's Curse (2017), although the film failed to achieve a general release.

In May 2012, Acorah claimed to have received a psychic message from Madeleine McCann via a 'spirit guide', stating that the child had died some time ago but would soon be reincarnated. After widespread media outrage, Acorah used the same newspaper to publish an apology to McCann's parents.

Acorah appeared in the 2015 television show The Past Hunters.

Acorah competed in the twentieth series of Celebrity Big Brother. He left the house on the final night in fourth place.

== Personal life ==
Acorah was married to Joan Hughes from 1972 to 1982. The couple had a son together, Carl. He was then married to his second wife, Gwen, from 1995 until his death in 2020. The couple were patrons for the charity Pathfinder Guide Dog Programme, a registered charity which provides guide dogs for the blind.

In March 2014, he was convicted of driving without due care and attention and failing to provide a breath sample following a car crash. Acorah had failed a roadside breath test but refused to give the required sample at a police station. He was banned from driving for 28 months and fined £1,000.

Acorah died on 4 January 2020, aged 69, following a short illness. His wife later confirmed that Acorah had been hospitalised with pneumonia and later developed sepsis.

== Bibliography ==
- The Psychic World of Derek Acorah: Discover How to Develop Your Hidden Powers – with John G. Sutton (Piatkus Books, 2003).
- The Psychic Adventures of Derek Acorah: Star of TV's "Most Haunted" (Element Books, 2004).
- Ghost Hunting with Derek Acorah (Element Books, 2005).
- Haunted Britain (Harper Element, 2006).
- Ghost Towns (Harper Element, 2006).
- Haunted Britain and Ireland (HarperCollins, 2007).
- Derek Acorah's Haunted! (Harper Element, 2008).
- Derek Acorah's Amazing Psychic Stories (Harper Element, 2008).
- Derek Acorah – Extreme Psychic (Harper Element, 2008).
