= LaMarcus Aldridge =

American basketball player (born 1985)

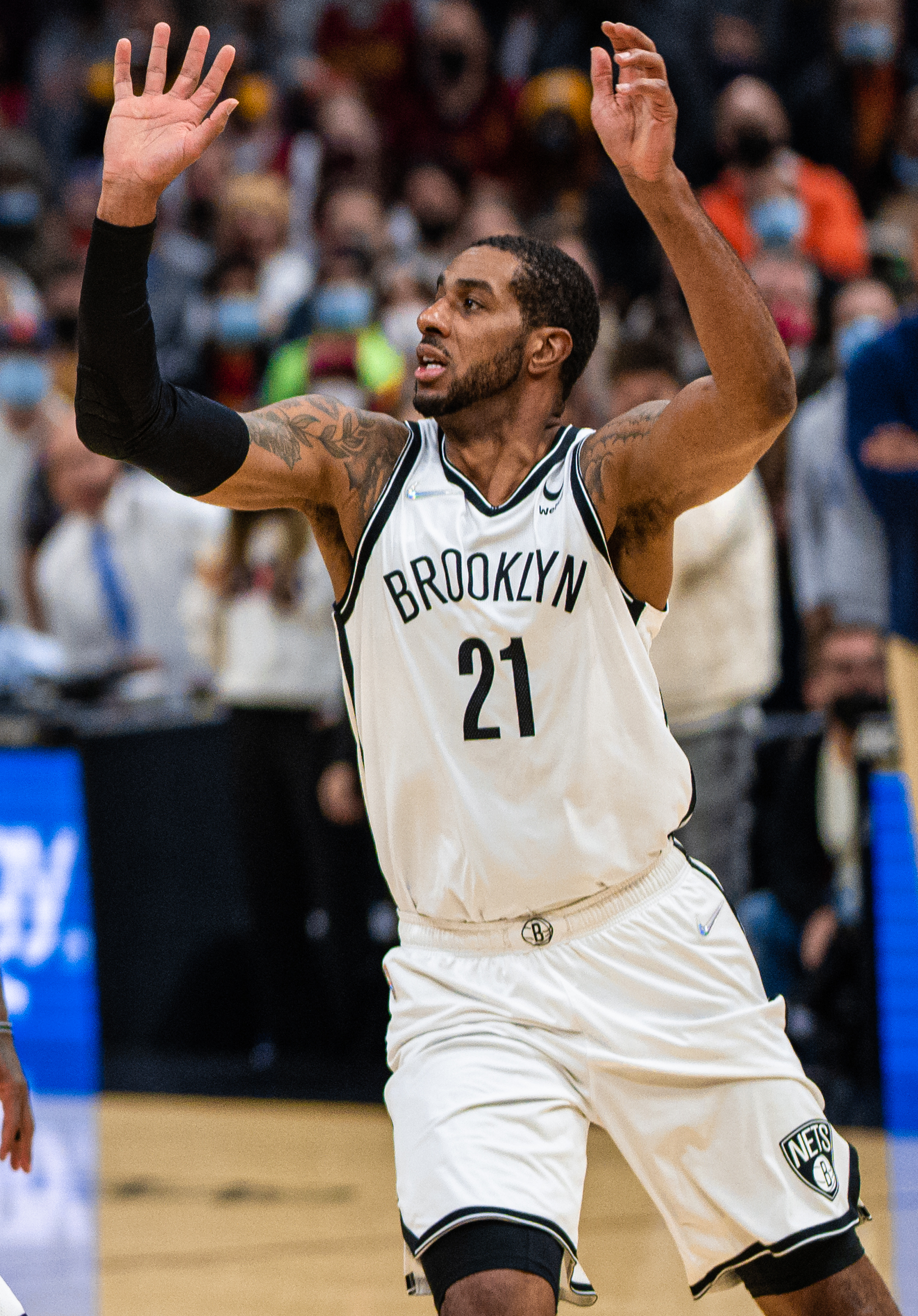
- Aldridge with the Brooklyn Nets in 2022

Personal information
- Born: July 19, 1985 (age 41) Dallas, Texas, U.S.
- Listed height: 6 ft 11 in (2.11 m)
- Listed weight: 250 lb (113 kg)

Career information
- High school: Seagoville (Dallas, Texas)
- College: Texas (2004–2006)
- NBA draft: 2006: 1st round, 2nd overall pick
- Drafted by: Chicago Bulls
- Playing career: 2006–2022
- Position: Power forward / center
- Number: 12, 21

Career history
- 2006–2015: Portland Trail Blazers
- 2015–2021: San Antonio Spurs
- 2021–2022: Brooklyn Nets

Career highlights
- 7× NBA All-Star (2012–2016, 2018, 2019); 2× All-NBA Second Team (2015, 2018); 3× All-NBA Third Team (2011, 2014, 2016); NBA All-Rookie First Team (2007); Third-team All-American – NABC (2006); First-team All-Big 12 (2006); Big 12 Defensive Player of the Year (2006); Big 12 All-Defensive Team (2006); Second-team Parade All-American (2004); McDonald's All-American (2004)

Career statistics
- Points: 20,558 (19.1 ppg)
- Rebounds: 8,736 (8.1 rpg)
- Assists: 2,076 (1.9 apg)
- Stats at NBA.com
- Stats at Basketball Reference

LaMarcus Nurae Aldridge (born July 19, 1985) is an American former professional basketball player who played in the National Basketball Association (NBA) for 16 seasons. He played college basketball for two seasons with the Texas Longhorns. Aldridge was selected second overall in the 2006 NBA draft. After spending nine seasons with the Portland Trail Blazers, he signed with the San Antonio Spurs in 2015. In March 2021, he signed with the Brooklyn Nets after the Spurs bought out his contract. He retired after two weeks due to an irregular heartbeat, but returned to the Nets the following season after receiving medical clearance.

Widely known for his signature fadeaway jump shot, Aldridge has been selected to five All-NBA teams and is a seven-time NBA All-Star.

== Early life ==
Aldridge's parents divorced when he was in the fifth grade and he was raised thereafter by his mother who worked for an insurance company. Aldridge grew up playing basketball alongside his older brother at parks in Dallas where he was considered to be "the tall kid who couldn't play." Standing at 6 ft 7 in (2.01 m) as an eighth grader, Aldridge was recruited by Robert Allen, the head basketball coach at Seagoville High School, because of his height.

== High school career ==
Aldridge attended Seagoville High School, where he became a second-team Parade All-American and Texas Association of Basketball Coaches (TABC) Class 4A Player of the Year.

Considered a five-star recruit by Rivals.com, Aldridge was listed as the no. 4 best center and the no. 16 player in the nation in 2004.

== College career ==
Aldridge attended the University of Texas at Austin. He declared for the 2004 NBA draft, but ultimately withdrew his name. According to one report, Aldridge's initial decision to attend college rather than entering the pro ranks directly from high school was influenced by Shaquille O'Neal's personal advice that he should go to college and then evaluate his NBA prospects. However, in April 2006, after the end of his second year with the Longhorns, Aldridge announced that he would leave college to enter the 2006 NBA draft.

== Professional career ==
=== Portland Trail Blazers (2006–2015) ===
==== 2006–07 season ====
Aldridge was drafted second overall in the 2006 NBA draft by the Chicago Bulls, only to have his rights traded to the Portland Trail Blazers for their pick, Tyrus Thomas, and Viktor Khryapa, shortly after. The Bulls acquired the pick from the New York Knicks in the 2005 Eddy Curry trade.

Aldridge missed the first seven games of the 2006–07 NBA season due to off-season shoulder surgery, but returned ahead of schedule due in part to an injury to fellow rookie teammate Brandon Roy. Aldridge made an immediate impact on offense, averaging 8.4 points on 54% shooting from the field through his first 14 games. After the loss of starting center Joel Przybilla, in February 2007 to season-ending knee surgery, Aldridge was awarded the starting center position and improved his scoring to 14.7 points with 8.0 rebounds per game in the month of March. This placed him second in the voting for the Western Conference Rookie of the Month to Roy. On March 31, 2007, in the first quarter against the Los Angeles Clippers, Aldridge was taken to Providence Hospital in Portland for shortness of breath and irregular heartbeat. He was diagnosed with Wolff–Parkinson–White syndrome on April 9 and missed the remaining eight games of the 2006–07 season. Aldridge started 22 games in his rookie season.

Aldridge was one of six players named to the 2007 NBA All-Rookie first team; he tied for fifth place with Toronto Raptors player Jorge Garbajosa.

==== 2007–08 season ====
Aldridge elevated his play in his second season, with career highs in points, rebounds, assists, blocks and steals, and finished third in voting for the NBA Most Improved Player Award. During this season, Aldridge had injury troubles due to plantar fasciitis, which caused him to miss games from December 11–18, 2007. After the time missed, Aldridge still had some trouble with the foot but was able to play effectively.

==== 2008–09 season ====
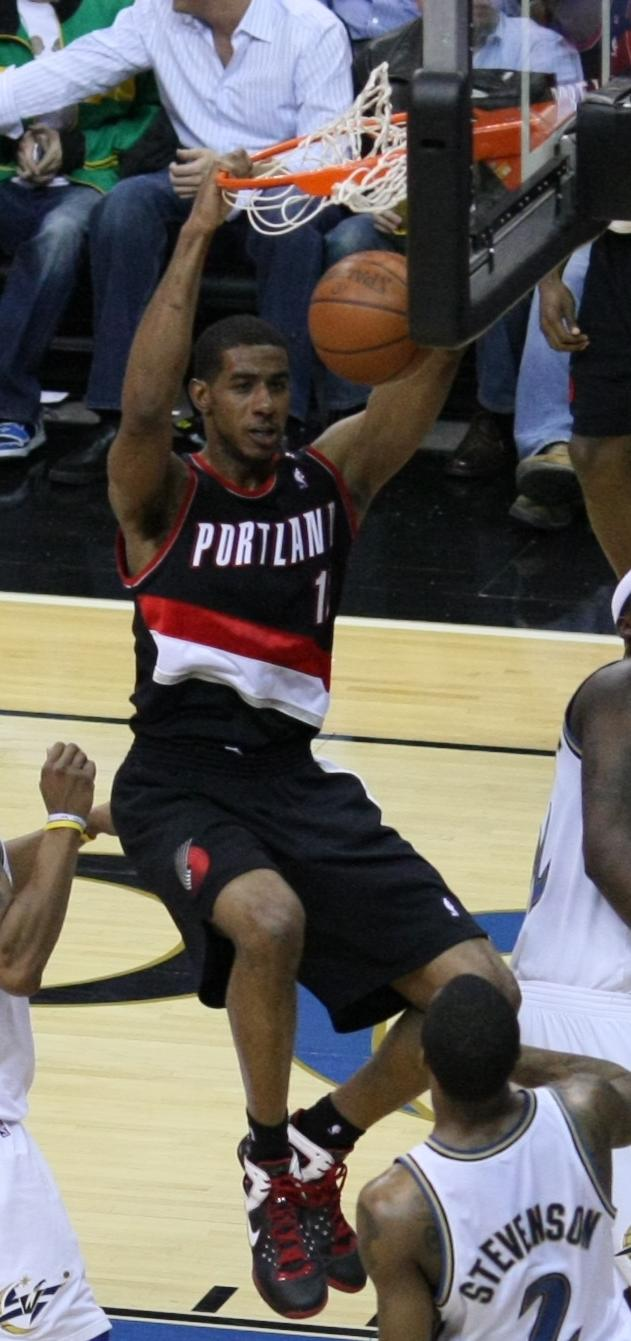
Aldridge hangs onto the rim in 2008

Aldridge played inconsistently to start the season, adjusting to more defensive pressure. He called the first 15 games "the worst funk" of his life but gradually improved as the season went on.

Aldridge developed his offensive game over the course of the season, still relying heavily on his midrange fade away shot. He finished the season averaging 18.1 points and 7.5 rebounds. Aldridge scored over 20 points in half of the last 28 games of the season. For his first time in the league Aldridge nearly played a full season, missing only one game.

==== 2009–10 season ====
In late October, Aldridge signed a five-year, $65 million contract extension with Portland. Before committing to Aldridge, the Trail Blazers finalized a five-year, $80 million deal with All-Star Brandon Roy.

Aldridge put up similar numbers to the previous season. Early in December, Greg Oden suffered a season-ending injury. Aldridge received more minutes and offensive opportunities as a result.

==== 2010–11 season ====
Aldridge further emerged as both a player and a leader after Brandon Roy went out with knee problems in December 2010. In spite of Portland's "send LA to LA" program — the NBA All-Star game was in Los Angeles and Aldridge's nickname is "L-A" — Aldridge failed to get named to the Western Conference squad. LeBron James called Aldridge's omission as "the biggest snub in All-Star history." He was, however, awarded the NBA Player of the Week for January 17–23 and February 7–13, and scored a career-high 42 points against the Chicago Bulls on February 7, 2011. On March 2, he joined Clyde Drexler (1991) and Kelvin Ransey (1981) as the only Blazers to ever receive the NBA Player of the Month award. Aldridge was runner-up to Kevin Love for the Most Improved Player Award, and voted to the All-NBA Third Team with 135 votes.

==== 2011–12 season ====
Due to the lockout, the 2011–12 season did not start until Christmas Day 2011. Blazer fans were hopeful that the three players advertised in their "Rise With Us" promotional campaign (Aldridge, Roy, and Greg Oden) would finally have a chance to play together for a "full" season. Those plans evaporated when Roy, who suffered from chronic knee problems due to the lack of cartilage in them, retired and Oden, who had only played in 82 games in the previous four seasons, had yet another setback in his effort to rehabilitate his knees. Aldridge was named a reserve on the Western Conference All-Star team in 2012.

==== 2012–13 season ====
On November 12, 2012, Aldridge recorded a career-high eight assists in a 95–87 loss to the Atlanta Hawks. In 2013, Aldridge was named an All-Star for the second time in his career. He averaged 21.1 points per game, a career-high 9.1 rebounds per game and also recorded a career-high 2.6 assists per game in 37.7 minutes per game. The Trail Blazers went 33–49 and missed the playoffs for the second straight year.

==== 2013–14 season ====
Despite trade rumors during the 2013 offseason, Aldridge voiced his desire to stay put in Portland, while also asking for improvements to the Blazers' roster. Aldridge started out his eighth NBA season strong, recording five straight double-doubles from November 9 to 17. On November 23, 2013, in a game against the Warriors, Aldridge was involved in an altercation after Warriors center Andrew Bogut became entangled with Joel Freeland. On November 25, it was announced that he was fined $45,000 for escalating the incident. The very same day, Aldridge was named Western Conference Player of the Week for the fourth time in his career. The award came in the midst of an 11-game win streak for the Blazers, during which Aldridge averaged 21.1 points, 11.3 rebounds, 2.5 assists, and 2.5 blocks per game. On December 12, 2013, Aldridge scored 31 points and grabbed a career-high 25 rebounds in a 111–104 victory over the Houston Rockets, becoming the first player in Portland Trail Blazers franchise history with at least 30 points and 25 rebounds in a game. On January 23, 2014, Aldridge recorded a career-high 44 points along with 13 rebounds, 5 assists and 2 blocks in a 110–105 victory over the Denver Nuggets.

The Trail Blazers went 31–10 over the first half of the 2014 season, consistently staying near the top of the Western Conference through the first three months of the season, and making a push for a return to the playoffs. Alongside teammate Damian Lillard, Aldridge was voted in as a reserve for the 2014 NBA All-Star Game, his third straight appearance. He finished fifth in the frontcourt fan voting, garnering over 600,000 votes.

Aldridge suffered a lower back contusion during the third quarter of a game versus the San Antonio Spurs on March 12, 2014. He missed the next seven games but returned in time to help the Blazers secure their 30th playoff berth and first since 2011.

On April 20, 2014, Aldridge recorded a new career high and franchise playoff high of 46 points along with 18 rebounds, two assists, and two blocks in Game 1 of the opening round of the playoffs against the Houston Rockets which ended in a 122–120 overtime win for the Portland Trail Blazers. On April 23, 2014, in Game 2 of the Blazers' series against the Houston Rockets, Aldridge tallied 43 points and eight rebounds. He joined Michael Jordan, Jerry West, Allen Iverson, and Tracy McGrady as the only players in NBA history to score 89 or more points in the first two games of a playoff series. Over the entire six-game series with Houston, Aldridge averaged 29.8 points and over 2.5 blocks per game. In the next series against the Spurs, Aldridge struggled, shooting only 41.7 percent from the field, as the Blazers were handily defeated in five games. Ultimately, Aldridge had a career season in 2014, winning three Western Conference Player of the Week awards, and recording career highs in points per game, rebounds per game, free-throw percentage, defensive rebounds, and double-doubles.

==== 2014–15 season ====
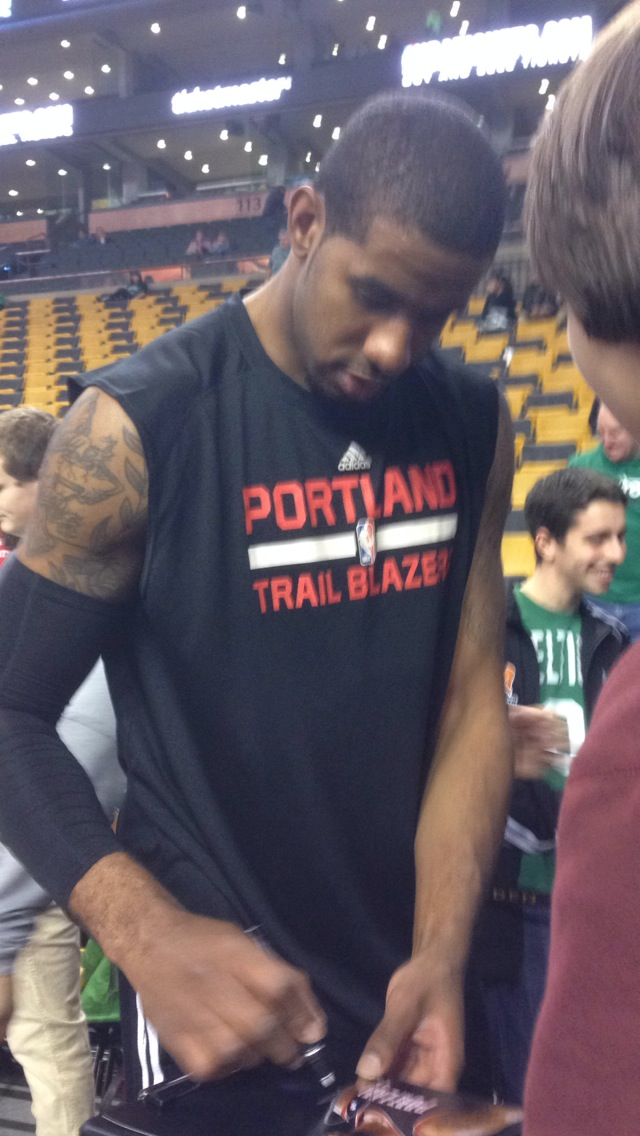
Aldridge signs an autograph after a game in Boston in 2014

On December 9, 2014, in a game against the Detroit Pistons, Aldridge passed Terry Porter for second on the franchise's all-time scoring list with 11,333 career points. After leading Portland over the first half of the season with averages of 23.2 points and 10.2 rebounds per game, Aldridge was ruled out for six to eight weeks on January 23, 2015, after tearing the radial collateral ligament in his left thumb. However, he missed just two games after deciding against surgery and returned to the starting lineup on January 24 against the Washington Wizards, scoring 26 points in a victory that followed two losses with him sidelined. After being selected as a frontcourt reserve to his fourth straight NBA All-Star Game appearance on January 29, Aldridge was named as a starter on February 14 by Western Conference All-Star head coach Steve Kerr, replacing the injured Anthony Davis.

On March 20, 2015, Aldridge became the Trail Blazers' all-time leader in rebounds by recording 10 against the Orlando Magic. Meanwhile, however, the Blazers were cooling off after a 30–11 record through the first 41 games of the season when shooting guard Wesley Matthews, whom Aldridge called "the heart and soul" of the Trail Blazers, tore his Achilles tendon on March 5 against the Dallas Mavericks and missed the rest of the season and playoffs. The Blazers subsequently went 21–20 through their final 41 games. In the playoffs, the short-handed Blazers were outplayed and outmatched by the Memphis Grizzlies in five games. Aldridge averaged a career-best 23.4 points per game, made a league-best 659 field goals, and was voted onto the All-NBA Second Team.

=== San Antonio Spurs (2015–2021) ===
==== 2015–16 season ====
On July 9, 2015, Aldridge signed a four-year, $80 million contract with the San Antonio Spurs. Upon being acquired by the Spurs, Aldridge was granted the number 12 jersey despite it having been retired for Bruce Bowen. Bowen gave Aldridge and the Spurs his blessing to unretire the number for him. He made his debut for the Spurs in the team's season opener on October 28 against the Oklahoma City Thunder. In just under 32 minutes of action, he recorded 11 points and 5 rebounds in a 112–106 loss. On November 11, he returned to Portland for the first time as a Spur, recording 23 points and 6 rebounds in a 113–101 win over his former team. On February 1, 2016, he scored a season-high 28 points in a 107–92 win over the Orlando Magic, helping the Spurs win its 35th straight home game (dating to March 2015), good for the sixth-best streak in league history. He topped his season-high mark two days later, scoring 36 points in a 110–97 win over the New Orleans Pelicans. With the win, the Spurs moved to 27–0 at home to start the season, snapping a tie with the 1977–78 Portland Trail Blazers for the best home start among Western Conference teams. On February 8, he was named the Western Conference Player of the Week for games played Monday, February 1 through Sunday, February 7. He averaged 26.0 points, 7.3 rebounds and 2.5 blocks while shooting .597 (37–62) from the field and .909 from the free throw line to help the Spurs go 4–0 for the week.

After dislocating his right pinkie finger on April 7, it bothered him for the rest of the regular season and into the playoffs. As the No. 2 seed in the Western Conference, the Spurs faced a depleted Memphis Grizzlies team in the first round. In a Game 1 win, Aldridge scored 17 points. The Spurs went on to sweep the Grizzlies in the first round to move on to the conference semifinals, where they faced the Oklahoma City Thunder. In Game 1 of the series against the Thunder, Aldridge scored a game-high 38 points on 18-of-23 shooting in a 124–92 win. In a Game 2 loss, he bested that mark by scoring 41 points.

==== 2016–17 season ====
In the Spurs' season opener on October 25, 2016, Aldridge recorded 26 points and 14 rebounds in a 129–100 win over the Golden State Warriors. His next best performance came on December 25 against the Chicago Bulls. Aldridge had a season-high 33 points in a 119–110 win over the Bulls, marking his second-highest scoring output as a Spur. He made his first nine attempts while scoring 20 points in the opening period, his most in any quarter with the Spurs. On March 11, 2017, he was ruled out for an indefinite period due to an occurrence of a minor heart arrhythmia. He was medically cleared to return on March 15. In his first game back, Aldridge had 19 points and seven rebounds in a 110–106 loss to the Portland Trail Blazers. As a result, Aldridge reached 1,000 points for a 10th straight season, joining LeBron James and Dwyane Wade as the only active players (at the time) with that streak.

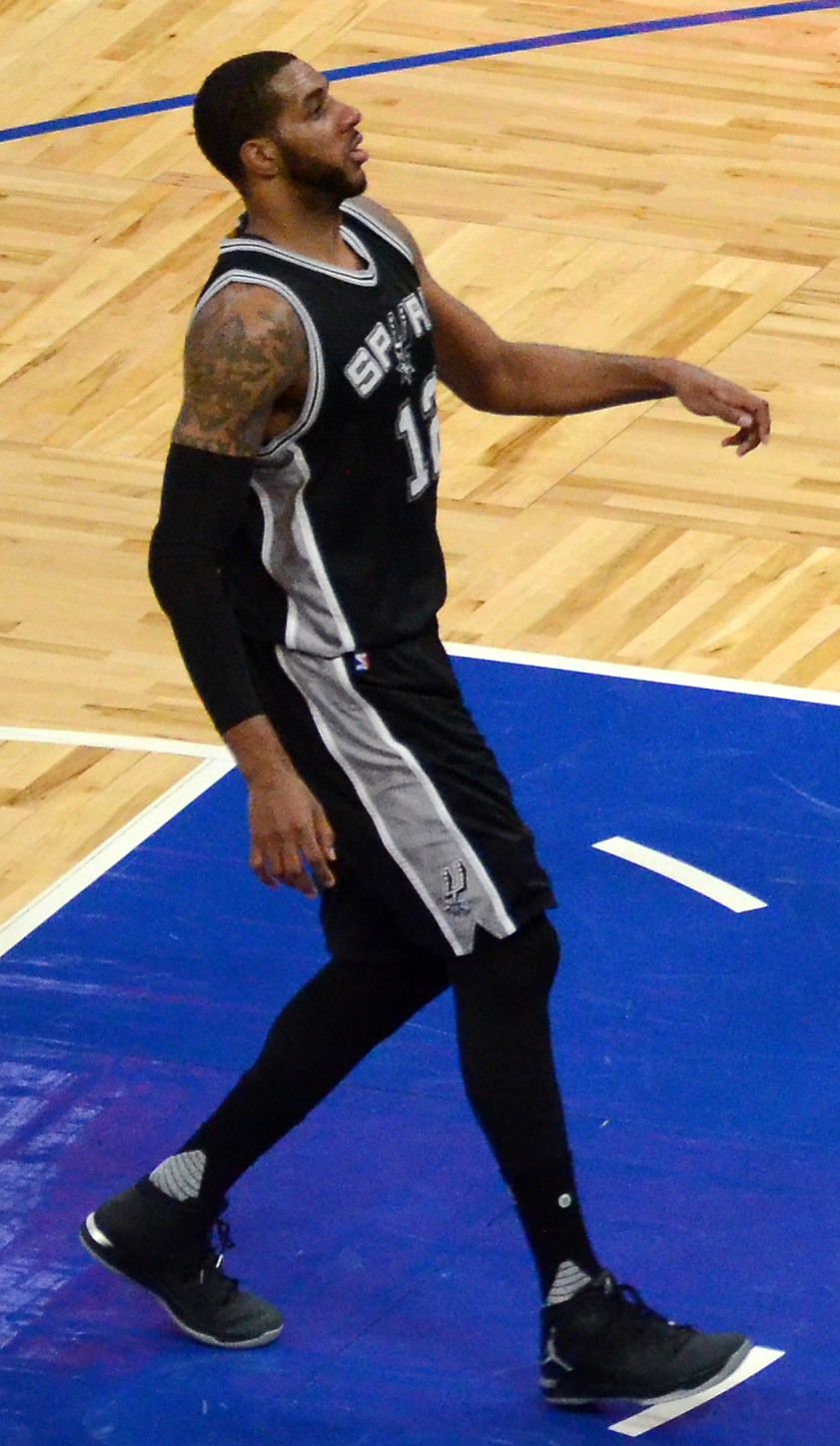
Aldridge with San Antonio in February 2017

On May 11, 2017, the Spurs eliminated the Houston Rockets with a 114–75 victory in Game 6 of their second-round playoff series behind a season-high 34 points from Aldridge. Aldridge had failed to get out of the second round in his previous six postseason trips. He also became the first Spur to score 34 points with 12 rebounds in a playoff game since Tim Duncan against the Phoenix Suns in 2008. The Spurs went on to lose to the Warriors in a clean sweep in the Western Conference Finals. Aldridge closed out a disappointing series with his second eight-point effort against the Warriors. He entered Game 4 averaging 18 points but was held to 4-for-11 shooting in 22 minutes in the series finale.

==== 2017–18 season ====
On October 16, 2017, Aldridge signed a three-year, $72.3 million contract extension with the Spurs, with only $7 million guaranteed in the final year of the extension. Two days later, in the Spurs' season opener, Aldridge had 25 points and 10 rebounds in a 107–99 win over the Minnesota Timberwolves. On November 14, 2017, he scored a season-high 32 points in a 97–91 win over the Dallas Mavericks. On November 27, 2017, he set a new season high with 33 points in a 115–108 win over the Mavericks. Two days later, he set his San Antonio high with 41 points in a 104–95 win over the Memphis Grizzlies. On January 23, 2018, he was named a Western Conference All-Star reserve, becoming the first Spurs player who didn't play his rookie season in San Antonio to make the All-Star team since Artis Gilmore in 1986. Three days later, in a 97–78 loss to the Philadelphia 76ers, Aldridge grabbed his 7,000th career rebound. On March 17, 2018, he had a 39-point effort in a 117–101 win over the Minnesota Timberwolves. On March 21, 2018, in a 98–90 win over the Washington Wizards, Aldridge became the 27th player in league history with 900-plus blocks and 16,000-plus points in his career. Two days later, he had a career-high 45 points in a 124–120 overtime win over the Utah Jazz. His 28 points in the first half were the most by a Spurs in a half since Manu Ginóbili had 28 points against Cleveland in 2008. In Game 2 of the Spurs' first-round playoff series against the Golden State Warriors, Aldridge scored a game-high 34 points in a 116–101 loss. The Spurs went on to lose the series in five games.

==== 2018–19 season ====
In the Spurs' season opener on October 17, Aldridge recorded 21 points and 19 rebounds in a 112–108 win over the Minnesota Timberwolves. On October 22, he had 37 points and 10 rebounds in a 143–142 overtime win over the Los Angeles Lakers. On December 29, he scored 38 points in a 122–111 win over the Los Angeles Clippers. On January 10, 2019, he scored a career-high 56 points in a 154–147 double-overtime victory over the Oklahoma City Thunder. On January 31, 2019, he was named a Western Conference All-Star reserve. On February 2, he had 25 points and 14 rebounds in a 113–108 win over the New Orleans Pelicans, thus reaching 18,000 points. On March 24, he had 48 points and 13 rebounds in a 115–98 win over the Boston Celtics.

==== 2019–20 season ====
In a game against the Golden State Warriors, Aldridge collected his 8,000th career rebound. On November 7, 2019, against the Oklahoma City Thunder, Aldridge recorded a season-high 39 points in a winning effort. On June 8, 2020, the San Antonio Spurs announced that Aldridge had undergone an arthroscopic subacromial decompression and rotator cuff debridement on his right shoulder on April 24 and would miss the remainder of the 2019–20 season.

==== 2020–21 season ====
In 2020–21, Aldridge missed eight of San Antonio's final 11 games before the NBA All-Star break due to hip and quadriceps injuries. They were 6–2 in the games that he missed. He was a reserve in the three games that he did play, the first time he came off the bench since he was a rookie with Portland. After the break, Aldridge and the Spurs mutually agreed that he would not return to the team, and he was granted permission to seek out opportunities with other teams. He was averaging 13.7 points and 4.5 rebounds in 25.9 minutes per game for the season. On March 25, 2021, Aldridge reached a contract buyout agreement with San Antonio.

=== Brooklyn Nets (2021–2022) ===
On March 28, 2021, Aldridge signed with the Brooklyn Nets. On April 1, he debuted for the Nets, posting 11 points, nine rebounds and a season-high six assists in a 111–89 win against Charlotte Hornets. On April 15, Aldridge announced his retirement, citing health concerns arising from an irregular heartbeat.

On September 3, 2021, Aldridge re-signed with the Nets after he received medical clearance to return to playing professional basketball. On October 22, Aldridge scored a season-high 23 points in a win against Philadelphia 76ers. On October 29, Aldridge scored 21 points in a 105–98 win over the Indiana Pacers, reaching 20,000 career points.

On March 31, 2023, Aldridge announced his retirement for a second time.

== Career statistics ==
Legend
GP	Games played	GS	Games started	MPG	Minutes per game
FG%	Field goal percentage	3P%	3-point field goal percentage	FT%	Free throw percentage
RPG	Rebounds per game	APG	Assists per game	SPG	Steals per game
BPG	Blocks per game	PPG	Points per game	**Bold**	Career high

=== NBA ===
==== Regular season ====
Year	Team	GP	GS	MPG	FG%	3P%	FT%	RPG	APG	SPG	BPG	PPG
2006–07	Portland	63	22	22.1	.503	.000	.722	5.0	.4	.3	1.2	9.0
2007–08	Portland	76	76	34.9	.484	.143	.762	7.6	1.6	.7	1.2	17.8
2008–09	Portland	**81**	**81**	37.1	.484	.250	.781	7.5	1.9	**1.0**	1.0	18.1
2009–10	Portland	78	78	37.5	.495	.313	.757	8.0	2.1	.9	.6	17.9
2010–11	Portland	**81**	**81**	**39.6**	.500	.174	.791	8.8	2.1	**1.0**	1.2	21.8
2011–12	Portland	55	55	36.3	.512	.182	.814	8.0	2.4	.9	.8	21.7
2012–13	Portland	74	74	37.7	.484	.143	.810	9.1	**2.6**	.8	1.2	21.1
2013–14	Portland	69	69	36.2	.458	.200	.822	**11.1**	**2.6**	.9	1.0	23.2
2014–15	Portland	71	71	35.4	.466	.352	.845	10.2	1.7	.7	1.0	**23.4**
2015–16	San Antonio	74	74	30.6	.513	.000	.858	8.5	1.5	.5	1.1	18.0
2016–17	San Antonio	72	72	32.4	.477	.411	.812	7.3	1.9	.6	1.2	17.3
2017–18	San Antonio	75	75	33.5	.510	.293	.837	8.5	2.0	.6	1.2	23.1
2018–19	San Antonio	**81**	**81**	33.2	.519	.238	.847	9.2	2.4	.5	1.3	21.3
2019–20	San Antonio	53	53	33.1	.493	.389	.827	7.4	2.4	.7	1.6	18.9
2020–21	San Antonio	21	18	25.9	.464	.360	.838	4.5	1.7	.4	.9	13.7
2020–21	Brooklyn	5	5	26.0	.521	**.800**	**1.000**	4.8	**2.6**	.6	**2.2**	12.8
2021–22	Brooklyn	47	12	22.3	**.550**	.304	.873	5.5	.9	.3	1.0	12.9
Career		1,076	997	33.7	.493	.320	.813	8.1	1.9	.7	1.1	19.1
All-Star		7	1	11.7	.368	.800	—	2.9	.6	.1	.4	4.6

==== Playoffs ====
Year	Team	GP	GS	MPG	FG%	3P%	FT%	RPG	APG	SPG	BPG	PPG
2009	Portland	6	6	39.5	.490	.250	.700	7.5	1.3	.5	1.7	19.5
2010	Portland	6	6	38.2	.430	.500	.750	6.0	2.2	1.2	1.8	19.0
2011	Portland	6	6	**43.0**	.461	—	.792	7.5	1.3	**1.3**	1.7	20.8
2014	Portland	11	11	40.1	.452	.667	.800	10.6	1.5	.6	1.6	**26.2**
2015	Portland	5	5	41.6	.330	.273	.889	**11.2**	1.8	.4	**2.4**	21.8
2016	San Antonio	10	10	33.7	**.521**	**1.000**	.891	8.3	1.0	.4	1.4	21.9
2017	San Antonio	**16**	**16**	33.6	.458	.143	.764	7.4	1.5	.6	1.0	16.5
2018	San Antonio	5	5	35.4	.463	.600	**.976**	9.2	2.4	.6	.4	23.6
2019	San Antonio	7	7	34.9	.455	.273	.818	9.6	**2.7**	.7	1.0	20.0
Career		72	72	37.1	.455	.327	.824	8.5	1.7	.7	1.4	20.8

=== College ===
Year	Team	GP	GS	MPG	FG%	3P%	FT%	RPG	APG	SPG	BPG	PPG
2004–05	Texas	16	16	22.2	.663	—	.657	5.9	.9	1.1	1.5	9.9
2005–06	Texas	37	37	33.7	.569	—	.646	9.2	.5	1.4	2.0	15.0
Career		53	53	30.2	.586	—	.649	8.2	.6	1.3	1.8	13.5

== Awards and honors ==
NBA

- NBA All-Star: 2012, 2013, 2014, 2015, 2016, 2018, 2019
- All-NBA Second Team: 2015, 2018
- All-NBA Third Team: 2011, 2014, 2016
- NBA All-Rookie First Team: 2007
- Western Conference Player of the Week
  - January 17–23, 2011
  - February 7–13, 2011
  - March 11–17, 2013
  - November 18–24, 2013
  - December 2–8, 2013
  - December 9–15, 2013
  - December 1–7, 2014
  - December 15–21, 2014
  - February 1–7, 2016
  - March 19–25, 2018
- Western Conference Player of the Month
  - February 2011

College

- NABC All-American Third Team (2006)
- Big-12 Defensive Player of the Year (2006)
- First-team All-Big 12 (2006)
- Big-12 All-Defensive Team (2006)
- Big-12 All-Tournament Team (2006)

== Personal life ==
Aldridge and his ex-partner have a son together, who was born in 2009. His second son was born in 2011.

Aldridge's older brother, LaVontae, played basketball at Howard College until a knee injury ended his career. He died in 2022 at the age of 42. Aldridge's cousin, Marlon Hairston, is a midfielder for Columbus Crew SC of Major League Soccer.

In 2007, Aldridge was diagnosed with Wolff-Parkinson-White syndrome, a heart ailment. He missed the rest of the 2006–07 regular season in order to monitor the problem and correct it. Prior to the 2011–12 season, Aldridge once again underwent surgery to correct complications associated with his heart condition.

Aldridge has appeared in two episodes of Portlandia — season 2 episode 8, attending the 10th anniversary of the bookstore Women and Women First with Penny Marshall, and season 4 episode 7, "Trail Blazers".

== See also ==
- List of NBA career scoring leaders
