= 2014–15 Portland Trail Blazers season =

NBA professional basketball team season

- Division champions
- Head coach: Terry Stotts
- General manager: Neil Olshey
- Owners: Paul Allen
- Arena: Moda Center

Results
- Record: 51–31 (.622)
- Place: Division: 1st (Northwest); Conference: 4th (Western)
- Playoff finish: First round (lost to Grizzlies 1–4)
- Stats at Basketball Reference

Local media
- Television: Comcast SportsNet Northwest, KGW
- Radio: KPOJ, Portland Trail Blazers Radio Network

The 2014–15 Portland Trail Blazers season was the 45th season of the franchise in the National Basketball Association (NBA). The Trail Blazers finished the regular-season with a 51–31 record, and captured the franchise's first Northwest division title. The Trail Blazers were eliminated by the Memphis Grizzlies in the first round in five games. Midway through the season Wesley Matthews suffered a season-ending Achilles tear. Following the season, LaMarcus Aldridge signed as a free agent with the San Antonio Spurs.

== Preseason ==
=== Draft picks ===
The Trail Blazers did not have any picks in the 2014 NBA draft.

== Regular season ==
=== Standings ===
| Northwest Division | W | L | PCT | GB | Home | Road | Div | GP |
|---|---|---|---|---|---|---|---|---|
| y-Portland Trail Blazers | 51 | 31 | .622 | – | 32‍–‍9 | 19‍–‍22 | 11–5 | 82 |
| Oklahoma City Thunder | 45 | 37 | .549 | 6.0 | 29‍–‍12 | 16‍–‍25 | 10–6 | 82 |
| Utah Jazz | 38 | 44 | .463 | 13.0 | 21‍–‍20 | 17‍–‍24 | 9–7 | 82 |
| Denver Nuggets | 30 | 52 | .366 | 21.0 | 19‍–‍22 | 11‍–‍30 | 6–10 | 82 |
| Minnesota Timberwolves | 16 | 66 | .195 | 35.0 | 9‍–‍32 | 7‍–‍34 | 4–12 | 82 |

Western Conference
| # | Team | W | L | PCT | GB | GP |
|---|---|---|---|---|---|---|
| 1 | z-Golden State Warriors * | 67 | 15 | .817 | – | 82 |
| 2 | y-Houston Rockets * | 56 | 26 | .683 | 11.0 | 82 |
| 3 | x-Los Angeles Clippers | 56 | 26 | .683 | 11.0 | 82 |
| 4 | y-Portland Trail Blazers * | 51 | 31 | .622 | 16.0 | 82 |
| 5 | x-Memphis Grizzlies | 55 | 27 | .671 | 12.0 | 82 |
| 6 | x-San Antonio Spurs | 55 | 27 | .671 | 12.0 | 82 |
| 7 | x-Dallas Mavericks | 50 | 32 | .610 | 17.0 | 82 |
| 8 | x-New Orleans Pelicans | 45 | 37 | .549 | 22.0 | 82 |
| 9 | Oklahoma City Thunder | 45 | 37 | .549 | 22.0 | 82 |
| 10 | Phoenix Suns | 39 | 43 | .476 | 28.0 | 82 |
| 11 | Utah Jazz | 38 | 44 | .463 | 29.0 | 82 |
| 12 | Denver Nuggets | 30 | 52 | .366 | 37.0 | 82 |
| 13 | Sacramento Kings | 29 | 53 | .354 | 38.0 | 82 |
| 14 | Los Angeles Lakers | 21 | 61 | .256 | 46.0 | 82 |
| 15 | Minnesota Timberwolves | 16 | 66 | .195 | 51.0 | 82 |

== Game log ==
=== Preseason ===
2014 pre-season game log
Total: 4–3 (home: 2–1; road: 2–2)
Pre-season: 4–3 (home: 2–1; road: 2–2)

| Game | Date | Team | Score | High points | High rebounds | High assists | Location Attendance | Record |
|---|---|---|---|---|---|---|---|---|
| 1 | October 7 | @ Utah | L 73–92 | Will Barton (12) | Chris Kaman (4) | Nicolas Batum (4) | EnergySolutions Arena; 17,858 | 0–1 |
| 2 | October 9 | Utah | L 105–109 | LaMarcus Aldridge (22) | Batum, Aldridge, Lopez & Kaman (6) | Steve Blake (7) | Moda Center; 14,468 | 0–2 |
| 3 | October 12 | L.A. Clippers | W 119–114 | Wesley Matthews (22) | Chris Kaman (9) | Steve Blake (7) | Moda Center; 17,784 | 1–2 |
| 4 | October 17 | Maccabi Haifa | W 121–74 | Robin Lopez (13) | Aldridge & Kaman (8) | Wesley Matthews (6) | Moda Center; 14,052 | 2–2 |
| 5 | October 21 | @ Denver | W 93–75 | LaMarcus Aldridge (20) | Robin Lopez (12) | Damian Lillard (6) | Coors Event Center; 4,872 | 3–2 |
| 6 | October 22 | @ L.A. Lakers | L 86–94 | CJ McCollum (17) | Thomas Robinson (7) | Kaman, Crabbe & McCollum (3) | Citizens Business Bank Arena; 7,174 | 3–3 |
| 7 | October 24 | @ L.A. Clippers | W 99–89 | Damian Lillard (21) | Chris Kaman (9) | Nicolas Batum (6) | Staples Center; 15,069 | 4–3 |

2014–15 pre-season schedule

=== Regular season ===
2014–15 game log
Total: 51–31 (home: 32–9; road: 19–22)
October: 1–1 (home: 1–0; road: 0–1)

| Game | Date | Team | Score | High points | High rebounds | High assists | Location Attendance | Record |
|---|---|---|---|---|---|---|---|---|
| 1 | October 29 | Oklahoma City | W 106–89 | LaMarcus Aldridge (27) | Robin Lopez (10) | Nicolas Batum (6) | Moda Center; 19,441 | 1–0 |
| 2 | October 31 | @ Sacramento | L 94–103 | LaMarcus Aldridge (22) | Damian Lillard (7) | Batum & Blake (5) | Sleep Train Arena; 14,648 | 1–1 |

November : 12–3 (home: 8–2; road: 4–1)

| Game | Date | Team | Score | High points | High rebounds | High assists | Location Attendance | Record |
|---|---|---|---|---|---|---|---|---|
| 3 | November 2 | Golden State | L 90–95 | LaMarcus Aldridge (26) | LaMarcus Aldridge (13) | Lillard & Blake (5) | Moda Center; 19,441 | 1–2 |
| 4 | November 4 | Cleveland | W 101–82 | Damian Lillard (27) | Damian Lillard (9) | Nicolas Batum (7) | Moda Center; 19,441 | 2–2 |
| 5 | November 6 | Dallas | W 108–87 | LaMarcus Aldridge (20) | Nicolas Batum (9) | Nicolas Batum (9) | Moda Center; 19,441 | 3–2 |
| 6 | November 8 | @ L.A. Clippers | L 102–106 | Damian Lillard (25) | LaMarcus Aldridge (10) | Batum & Lillard (8) | Staples Center; 19,060 | 3–3 |
| 7 | November 9 | Denver | W 116–100 | LaMarcus Aldridge (28) | Lopez, Aldridge & Batum (9) | Damian Lillard (7) | Moda Center; 19,411 | 4–3 |
| 8 | November 11 | Charlotte | W 102–100 | Damian Lillard (29) | LaMarcus Aldridge (14) | Lillard & Matthews (7) | Moda Center; 18,495 | 5–3 |
| 9 | November 12 | @ Denver | W 130–113 | Damian Lillard (27) | Aldridge & Kaman (7) | Damian Lillard (9) | Pepsi Center; 12,611 | 6–3 |
| 10 | November 15 | Brooklyn | W 97–87 | Damian Lillard (28) | Meyers Leonard (12) | Damian Lillard (10) | Moda Center; 19,441 | 7–3 |
| 11 | November 17 | New Orleans | W 102–93 | Damian Lillard (24) | Chris Kaman (10) | Lillard & Blake (7) | Moda Center; 19,441 | 8–3 |
| 12 | November 21 | Chicago | W 105–87 | Damian Lillard (21) | LaMarcus Aldridge (9) | Damian Lillard (9) | Moda Center; 19,866 | 9–3 |
| 13 | November 23 | @ Boston | W 94–88 | LaMarcus Aldridge (20) | LaMarcus Aldridge (14) | Lillard & Blake (5) | TD Garden; 16,692 | 10–3 |
| 14 | November 24 | @ Philadelphia | W 114–104 | LaMarcus Aldridge (33) | LaMarcus Aldridge (11) | Steve Blake (8) | Wells Fargo Center; 11,094 | 11–3 |
| 15 | November 26 | @ Charlotte | W 105–97 | Wesley Matthews (28) | LaMarcus Aldridge (14) | Damian Lillard (7) | Time Warner Cable Arena; 16,972 | 12–3 |
| 16 | November 28 | Memphis | L 99–112 | Wesley Matthews (26) | Chris Kaman (11) | Damian Lillard (9) | Moda Center; 19,459 | 12–4 |
| 17 | November 30 | Minnesota | W 107–93 | LaMarcus Aldridge (26) | LaMarcus Aldridge (15) | Damian Lillard (8) | Moda Center; 18,843 | 13–4 |

December : 13–3 (home: 6–0; road: 7–3)

| Game | Date | Team | Score | High points | High rebounds | High assists | Location Attendance | Record |
|---|---|---|---|---|---|---|---|---|
| 18 | December 2 | @ Denver | W 105–103 | LaMarcus Aldridge (39) | LaMarcus Aldridge (11) | Nicolas Batum (13) | Pepsi Center; 12,822 | 14–4 |
| 19 | December 4 | Indiana | W 88–82 | Damian Lillard (23) | LaMarcus Aldridge (13) | Nicolas Batum (5) | Moda Center; 19,191 | 15–4 |
| 20 | December 7 | @ New York | W 103–99 | LaMarcus Aldridge (24) | LaMarcus Aldridge (11) | Nicolas Batum (7) | Madison Square Garden; 19,812 | 16–4 |
| 21 | December 9 | @ Detroit | W 98–86 | LaMarcus Aldridge (23) | Aldridge & Batum (11) | Lillard & Blake (6) | Palace of Auburn Hills; 12,813 | 17–4 |
| 22 | December 10 | @ Minnesota | L 82–90 | Damian Lillard (23) | LaMarcus Aldridge (9) | Nicolas Batum (6) | Target Center; 10,337 | 17–5 |
| 23 | December 12 | @ Chicago | L 106–115 | Aldridge & Lillard (35) | LaMarcus Aldridge (9) | Damian Lillard (6) | United Center; 21,725 | 17–6 |
| 24 | December 13 | @ Indiana | W 95–85 | LaMarcus Aldridge (19) | LaMarcus Aldridge (14) | Steve Blake (7) | Bankers Life Fieldhouse; 17,206 | 18–6 |
| 25 | December 15 | San Antonio | W 108–95 | Aldridge & Lillard (23) | LaMarcus Aldridge (14) | Batum & Lillard (6) | Moda Center; 19,441 | 19–6 |
| 26 | December 17 | Milwaukee | W 104–97 | Damian Lillard (29) | Thomas Robinson (16) | Damian Lillard (7) | Moda Center; 19,495 | 20–6 |
| 27 | December 19 | @ San Antonio | W 129–119 (3OT) | Damian Lillard (43) | LaMarcus Aldridge (16) | Damian Lillard (6) | AT&T Center; 18,581 | 21–6 |
| 28 | December 20 | @ New Orleans | W 114–88 | LaMarcus Aldridge (27) | LaMarcus Aldridge (12) | Damian Lillard (7) | Smoothie King Center; 16,079 | 22–6 |
| 29 | December 22 | @ Houston | L 95–110 | Damian Lillard (18) | Chris Kaman (6) | Batum, Lillard & McCollum (3) | Toyota Center; 18,316 | 22–7 |
| 30 | December 23 | @ Oklahoma City | W 115–111 (OT) | Damian Lillard (40) | Aldridge & Kaman (9) | Damian Lillard (11) | Chesapeake Energy Arena; 18,203 | 23–7 |
| 31 | December 26 | Philadelphia | W 114–93 | Damian Lillard (28) | Joel Freeland (17) | Damian Lillard (9) | Moda Center; 19,972 | 24–7 |
| 32 | December 28 | New York | W 101–79 | Wesley Matthews (28) | Joel Freeland (10) | Damian Lillard (6) | Moda Center; 19,800 | 25–7 |
| 33 | December 30 | Toronto | W 102–97 (OT) | Damian Lillard (26) | LaMarcus Aldridge (13) | Damian Lillard (9) | Moda Center; 20,053 | 26–7 |

January : 6–9 (home: 5–3; road: 1–6)

| Game | Date | Team | Score | High points | High rebounds | High assists | Location Attendance | Record |
|---|---|---|---|---|---|---|---|---|
| 34 | January 3 | Atlanta | L 107–115 | LaMarcus Aldridge (30) | LaMarcus Aldridge (12) | Damian Lillard (7) | Moda Center; 19,829 | 26–8 |
| 35 | January 5 | L.A. Lakers | W 98–94 | Damian Lillard (39) | Meyers Leonard (12) | Damian Lillard (5) | Moda Center; 19,827 | 27–8 |
| 36 | January 8 | Miami | W 99–83 | LaMarcus Aldridge (24) | LaMarcus Aldridge (12) | Matthews & Blake (5) | Moda Center; 19,441 | 28–8 |
| 37 | January 10 | Orlando | W 103–92 | LaMarcus Aldridge (25) | Nicolas Batum (10) | Damian Lillard (5) | Moda Center; 19,546 | 29–8 |
| 38 | January 11 | @ L.A. Lakers | W 106–94 | Damian Lillard (34) | Chris Kaman (12) | Damian Lillard (7) | Staples Center; 18,997 | 30–8 |
| 39 | January 14 | L.A. Clippers | L 94–100 | LaMarcus Aldridge (37) | LaMarcus Aldridge (12) | Nicolas Batum (6) | Moda Center; 19,441 | 30–9 |
| 40 | January 16 | @ San Antonio | L 96–110 | LaMarcus Aldridge (24) | LaMarcus Aldridge (8) | Damian Lillard (5) | AT&T Center; 18,581 | 30–10 |
| 41 | January 17 | @ Memphis | L 98–102 | LaMarcus Aldridge (32) | Chris Kaman (11) | Steve Blake (8) | FedEx Forum; 18,119 | 30–11 |
| 42 | January 19 | Sacramento | W 98–94 | Damian Lillard (22) | Lillard & Robinson (6) | Damian Lillard (5) | Moda Center; 19,441 | 31–11 |
| 43 | January 21 | @ Phoenix | L 113–118 | Nicolas Batum (27) | Nicolas Batum (10) | Damian Lillard (6) | US Airways Center; 16,703 | 31–12 |
| 44 | January 22 | Boston | L 89–90 | Damian Lillard (21) | Thomas Robinson (12) | Damian Lillard (7) | Moda Center; 19,567 | 31–13 |
| 45 | January 24 | Washington | W 103–96 | LaMarcus Aldridge (26) | Chris Kaman (10) | Damian Lillard (7) | Moda Center; 19,775 | 32–13 |
| 46 | January 28 | @ Cleveland | L 94–99 | LaMarcus Aldridge (38) | Chris Kaman (13) | Nicolas Batum (7) | Quicken Loans Arena; 20,562 | 32–14 |
| 47 | January 30 | @ Atlanta | L 99–105 | LaMarcus Aldridge (37) | LaMarcus Aldridge (11) | Damian Lillard (11) | Philips Arena; 19,018 | 32–15 |
| 48 | January 31 | @ Milwaukee | L 88–95 | Lillard & Matthews (19) | LaMarcus Aldridge (13) | Damian Lillard (9) | BMO Harris Bradley Center; 18,717 | 32–16 |

February : 6–3 (home: 5–1; road: 1–2)

| Game | Date | Team | Score | High points | High rebounds | High assists | Location Attendance | Record |
|---|---|---|---|---|---|---|---|---|
| 49 | February 3 | Utah | W 103–102 | Damian Lillard (25) | LaMarcus Aldridge (11) | Batum & Lillard (6) | Moda Center; 19,441 | 33–16 |
| 50 | February 5 | Phoenix | W 108–87 | Nicolas Batum (20) | LaMarcus Aldridge (13) | Nicolas Batum (7) | Moda Center; 19,488 | 34–16 |
| 51 | February 7 | @ Dallas | L 101–111 (OT) | Damian Lillard (26) | LaMarcus Aldridge (14) | Blake & Lillard (7) | American Airlines Center; 20,398 | 34–17 |
| 52 | February 8 | @ Houston | W 109–98 | LaMarcus Aldridge (24) | Nicolas Batum (7) | Damian Lillard (5) | Toyota Center; 18,243 | 35–17 |
| 53 | February 11 | L.A. Lakers | W 102–86 | Wesley Matthews (20) | LaMarcus Aldridge (12) | Damian Lillard (8) | Moda Center; 19,585 | 36–17 |
All-Star Break
| 54 | February 20 | @ Utah | L 76–92 | Damian Lillard (19) | LaMarcus Aldridge (9) | Nicolas Batum (3) | EnergySolutions Arena; 19,911 | 36–18 |
| 55 | February 22 | Memphis | L 92–98 | Damian Lillard (18) | Nicolas Batum (10) | Damian Lillard (7) | Moda Center; 19,782 | 36–19 |
| 56 | February 25 | San Antonio | W 111–95 | Wesley Matthews (31) | LaMarcus Aldridge (13) | Nicolas Batum (9) | Moda Center; 19,650 | 37–19 |
| 57 | February 27 | Oklahoma City | W 115–112 | Aldridge & Lillard (29) | LaMarcus Aldridge (16) | Aldridge & Lillard (5) | Moda Center; 19,962 | 38–19 |

March : 10–6 (home: 5–1; road: 5–5)

| Game | Date | Team | Score | High points | High rebounds | High assists | Location Attendance | Record |
|---|---|---|---|---|---|---|---|---|
| 58 | March 1 | @Sacramento | W 110–99 | Damian Lillard (31) | LaMarcus Aldridge (15) | Damian Lillard (7) | Sleep Train Arena; 16,776 | 39–19 |
| 59 | March 4 | @ L.A. Clippers | W 98–93 (OT) | LaMarcus Aldridge (29) | Damian Lillard (18) | Nicolas Batum (8) | Staples Center; 19,060 | 40–19 |
| 60 | March 5 | Dallas | W 94–75 | LaMarcus Aldridge (17) | Aldridge & Batum (12) | Nicolas Batum (6) | Moda Center; 19,499 | 41–19 |
| 61 | March 7 | @ Minnesota | L 113–121 | Damian Lillard (32) | LaMarcus Aldridge (8) | Damian Lillard (8) | Target Center; 19,356 | 41–20 |
| 62 | March 11 | Houston | W 105–100 | LaMarcus Aldridge (26) | LaMarcus Aldridge (14) | Damian Lillard (8) | Moda Center; 19,279 | 42–20 |
| 63 | March 13 | Detroit | W 118–99 | Damian Lillard (28) | Nicolas Batum (8) | Damian Lillard (9) | Moda Center; 19,486 | 43–20 |
| 64 | March 15 | @ Toronto | W 113–97 | LaMarcus Aldridge (24) | LaMarcus Aldridge (10) | Nicolas Batum (12) | Air Canada Centre; 19,800 | 44–20 |
| 65 | March 16 | @ Washington | L 97–105 | LaMarcus Aldridge (24) | Nicolas Batum (15) | Damian Lillard (9) | Verizon Center; 17,324 | 44–21 |
| 66 | March 18 | @ Miami | L 104–108 | LaMarcus Aldridge (34) | LaMarcus Aldridge (12) | Batum & Blake (6) | American Airlines Center; 19,621 | 44–22 |
| 67 | March 20 | @ Orlando | L 104–111 | LaMarcus Aldridge (34) | Nicolas Batum (11) | Batum & Lillard (4) | Amway Center; 16,203 | 44–23 |
| 68 | March 21 | @ Memphis | L 86–97 | Damian Lillard (27) | Freeland & Lopez (12) | Damian Lillard (7) | FedEx Forum; 17,898 | 44–24 |
| 69 | March 24 | Golden State | L 108–122 | Damian Lillard (29) | Lillard & Lopez (7) | Blake & Lillard (5) | Moda Center; 19,985 | 44–25 |
| 70 | March 25 | @ Utah | W 92–89 | Damian Lillard (23) | LaMarcus Aldridge (9) | Damian Lillard (12) | EnergySolutions Arena; 19,911 | 45–25 |
| 71 | March 27 | @ Phoenix | W 87–81 | LaMarcus Aldridge (27) | Chris Kaman (11) | Nicolas Batum (5) | US Airways Center; 17,219 | 46–25 |
| 72 | March 28 | Denver | W 120–114 | LaMarcus Aldridge (32) | LaMarcus Aldridge (11) | Damian Lillard (10) | Moda Center; 19,769 | 47–25 |
| 73 | March 30 | Phoenix | W 109–86 | Damian Lillard (19) | Aldridge & Kaman (7) | Damian Lillard (7) | Moda Center; 19,441 | 48–25 |

April : 3–6 (home: 2–2; road: 1–4)

| Game | Date | Team | Score | High points | High rebounds | High assists | Location Attendance | Record |
|---|---|---|---|---|---|---|---|---|
| 74 | April 1 | L.A. Clippers | L 122–126 | Nicolas Batum (21) | Robin Lopez (8) | Damian Lillard (10) | Moda Center; 19,639 | 48–26 |
| 75 | April 3 | @ L.A. Lakers | W 107–77 | CJ McCollum (27) | Nicolas Batum (10) | Blake & Lillard (5) | Staples Center; 18,997 | 49–26 |
| 76 | April 4 | New Orleans | W 99–90 | LaMarcus Aldridge (21) | Aldridge & Lopez (12) | Damian Lillard (4) | Moda Center; 19,781 | 50–26 |
| 77 | April 6 | @ Brooklyn | L 96–106 | Damian Lillard (36) | Meyers Leonard (15) | Blake & Leonard (4) | Barclays Center; 17,416 | 50–27 |
| 78 | April 8 | Minnesota | W 116–91 | LaMarcus Aldridge (24) | LaMarcus Aldridge (13) | Damian Lillard (6) | Moda Center; 19,499 | 51–27 |
| 79 | April 9 | @ Golden State | L 105–116 | Damian Lillard (20) | Nicolas Batum (10) | Batum & Lillard (8) | Oracle Arena; 19,596 | 51–28 |
| 80 | April 11 | Utah | L 105–111 | Damian Lillard (28) | CJ McCollum (8) | Nicolas Batum (8) | Moda Center; 19,908 | 51–29 |
| 81 | April 13 | @ Oklahoma City | L 90–101 | Meyers Leonard (24) | Allen Crabbe (7) | Damian Lillard (6) | Chesapeake Energy Arena; 18,203 | 51–30 |
| 82 | April 15 | @ Dallas | L 98–114 | LaMarcus Aldridge (19) | Meyers Leonard (9) | Tim Frazier (10) | American Airlines Center; 20,352 | 51–31 |

2014–15 season schedule

== Playoffs ==
2014 playoff game log
Total: 1–4 (home: 1–1; road: 0–3)
First Round: 1–4 (home: 1–1; road: 0–3)

| Game | Date | Team | Score | High points | High rebounds | High assists | Location Attendance | Series |
|---|---|---|---|---|---|---|---|---|
| 1 | April 19 | @ Memphis | L 86–100 | LaMarcus Aldridge (32) | LaMarcus Aldridge (14) | Batum, Blake (4) | FedExForum; 18,119 | 0–1 |
| 2 | April 22 | @ Memphis | L 82–97 | LaMarcus Aldridge (24) | LaMarcus Aldridge (14) | Nicolas Batum (7) | FedExForum; 18,119 | 0–2 |
| 3 | April 25 | Memphis | L 109–115 | Nicolas Batum (27) | LaMarcus Aldridge (7) | Damian Lillard (9) | Moda Center; 19,945 | 0–3 |
| 4 | April 27 | Memphis | W 99–92 | Damian Lillard (32) | Nicolas Batum (13) | Damian Lillard (7) | Moda Center; 19,541 | 1–3 |
| 5 | April 29 | @ Memphis | L 93–99 | CJ McCollum (33) | Nicolas Batum (10) | Nicolas Batum (7) | FedExForum; 18,119 | 1–4 |

2014 playoff schedule

== Player statistics ==
Statistics (Summer League, preseason, and regular season)

Legend
| GP | Games played | GS | Games started | MPG | Minutes per game |
| FG% | Field-goal percentage | 3P% | 3-point field-goal percentage | FT% | Free-throw percentage |
| RPG | Rebounds per game | APG | Assists per game | SPG | Steals per game |
| BPG | Blocks per game | PPG | Points per game |

=== Summer League ===
Portland Trail Blazers statistics
| Player | GP | GS | MPG | FG% | 3P% | FT% | RPG | APG | SPG | BPG | PPG |
|---|---|---|---|---|---|---|---|---|---|---|---|
| CJ McCollum | 5 | 5 | 33.0 | .479 | .345 | .700 | 3.2 | 2.0 | 1.8 | 0.0 | 20.2 |
| Will Barton | 5 | 4 | 31.8 | .377 | .227 | .882 | 6.4 | 3.0 | 1.2 | 0.0 | 14.4 |
| Meyers Leonard | 3 | 3 | 27.7 | .429 | .500 | .500 | 3.7 | 1.0 | 0.7 | 1.0 | 6.7 |
| Allen Crabbe | 5 | 1 | 22.6 | .455 | .000 | 1.000 | 3.0 | 1.0 | 0.4 | 0.0 | 5.6 |
| Joel Freeland | 5 | 4 | 26.8 | .385 | .000 | .615 | 6.2 | 0.8 | 0.0 | 0.6 | 5.6 |
| Thomas Robinson | 3 | 3 | 28.3 | .500 | .000 | .520 | 8.7 | 2.0 | 2.3 | 0.7 | 13.7 |

=== Preseason ===
Portland Trail Blazers statistics
| Player | GP | GS | MPG | FG% | 3P% | FT% | RPG | APG | SPG | BPG | PPG |
|---|---|---|---|---|---|---|---|---|---|---|---|
| LaMarcus Aldridge | 5 | 5 | 26.0 | .455 | .000 | .895 | 6.6 | 3.4 | 0.4 | 0.8 | 15.4 |
| Damian Lillard | 5 | 5 | 24.2 | .449 | .400 | .882 | 2.4 | 2.8 | 1.2 | 0.0 | 13.4 |
| Wesley Matthews | 6 | 6 | 24.8 | .500 | .586 | .80 | 3.0 | 2.3 | 0.8 | 0.0 | 13.2 |
| Chris Kaman | 7 | 2 | 18.6 | .608 | .000 | .900 | 6.7 | 1.4 | 0.4 | 1.6 | 10.1 |
| CJ McCollum | 7 | 1 | 22.1 | .407 | .333 | .950 | 2.4 | 1.7 | 1.1 | 0.0 | 10.0 |
| Will Barton | 7 | 0 | 17.9 | .463 | .364 | .765 | 2.9 | 1.9 | 1.1 | 0.6 | 7.9 |
| Robin Lopez | 6 | 6 | 21.8 | .516 | .000 | .800 | 6.8 | 1.3 | 0.3 | 1.0 | 7.3 |
| Nicolas Batum | 6 | 6 | 25.7 | .410 | .250 | .857 | 5.3 | 3.7 | 0.5 | 0.2 | 7.2 |
| Meyers Leonard | 6 | 0 | 14.3 | .469 | .400 | 1.000 | 3.8 | 1.2 | 0.2 | 0.5 | 7.0 |
| Allen Crabbe | 7 | 1 | 12.1 | .632 | .500 | .750 | 0.9 | 0.6 | 0.3 | 0.1 | 4.9 |
| Joel Freeland | 7 | 0 | 12.3 | .385 | .000 | .714 | 3.7 | 0.9 | 0.3 | 0.1 | 4.3 |
| Dorell Wright | 7 | 1 | 12.9 | .368 | .125 | .857 | 1.0 | 0.9 | 1.4 | 0.3 | 3.9 |
| Steve Blake | 5 | 1 | 21.2 | .304 | .231 | 1.000 | 2.0 | 5.0 | 0.6 | 0.0 | 3.8 |
| Thomas Robinson | 7 | 1 | 10.7 | .350 | .000 | .375 | 3.3 | 0.3 | 0.4 | 0.3 | 2.4 |
| Víctor Claver | 5 | 0 | 4.6 | .500 | .000 | 1.000 | 0.4 | 0.0 | 0.0 | 0.0 | 2.0 |

=== Regular season ===
Portland Trail Blazers statistics
| Player | GP | GS | MPG | FG% | 3P% | FT% | RPG | APG | SPG | BPG | PPG |
|---|---|---|---|---|---|---|---|---|---|---|---|
| Arron Afflalo | 5 | 0 | 27.7 | .452 | .438 | .786 | 2.6 | 1.6 | 0.6 | 0.0 | 9.2 |
| LaMarcus Aldridge | 71 | 71 | 36.2 | .452 | .373 | .866 | 10.5 | 1.8 | 0.8 | 1.1 | 23.4 |
| Will Barton | 30 | 0 | 10.0 | .380 | .222 | .667 | 1.1 | 0.9 | 0.4 | 0.1 | 3.0 |
| Nicolas Batum | 71 | 71 | 34.0 | .389 | .289 | .853 | 5.5 | 4.8 | 1.1 | 0.7 | 9.3 |
| Steve Blake | 81 | 0 | 20.1 | .377 | .348 | .727 | 1.8 | 3.6 | 0.5 | 0.1 | 4.5 |
| Víctor Claver | 10 | 0 | 7.6 | .450 | .545 | .000 | 2.0 | 0.1 | 0.1 | 0.1 | 2.4 |
| Allen Crabbe | 51 | 9 | 12.5 | .426 | .386 | .889 | 1.1 | 0.8 | 0.3 | 0.4 | 2.9 |
| Joel Freeland | 48 | 8 | 13.2 | .474 | .000 | .842 | 4.4 | 0.4 | 0.2 | 0.5 | 3.4 |
| Alonzo Gee | 54 | 2 | 3.6 | .500 | 1.000 | .500 | 0.0 | 0.0 | 0.5 | 0.0 | 2.0 |
| Chris Kaman | 74 | 13 | 20.0 | .492 | .000 | .701 | 6.6 | 0.9 | 0.2 | 0.9 | 8.7 |
| Meyers Leonard | 55 | 7 | 14.8 | .523 | .452 | .905 | 4.1 | 0.5 | 0.2 | 0.2 | 5.7 |
| Damian Lillard | 82 | 82 | 36.3 | .432 | .338 | .859 | 4.8 | 6.2 | 1.4 | 0.3 | 21.3 |
| Robin Lopez | 59 | 59 | 28.4 | .519 | .000 | .778 | 7.1 | 1.1 | 0.3 | 1.5 | 9.7 |
| Wesley Matthews | 60 | 60 | 34.0 | .449 | .391 | .748 | 3.7 | 2.3 | 1.3 | 0.2 | 16.1 |
| CJ McCollum | 62 | 3 | 12.4 | .391 | .403 | .700 | 1.0 | 0.8 | 0.5 | 0.1 | 4.9 |
| Thomas Robinson | 32 | 4 | 12.2 | .516 | .000 | .438 | 4.1 | 0.3 | 0.5 | 0.3 | 3.6 |
| Dorell Wright | 48 | 2 | 10.8 | .364 | .397 | .800 | 2.1 | 0.8 | 0.4 | 0.2 | 3.8 |

== Injuries ==
| Player | Duration | | Injury type | Games missed |
| Player | Start | End | Injury type | Games missed |
|---|---|---|---|---|
| Nicolas Batum | November 9 | November 21 | Right Leg Contusion | 4 |
| LaMarcus Aldridge | 3rd Week of November | 4th Week of November | Upper Respiratory Infection | 1 (Nov. 15) |
| CJ McCollum | November 17 | December 17 | Fractured Right Index Finger | 14 |
| Robin Lopez | December 15 | February 3 | Fractured 3rd and 4th metacarpals on right hand | 23 |
| Nicolas Batum | December 17 | December 26 | Knee and Wrist Contusion | 3 |
| LaMarcus Aldridge | December 22 | December 30 | Upper Respiratory Infection | 3 |
| Joel Freeland | January 3 | TBD | Strained Right Shoulder | TBD |
| Allen Crabbe | January 8 | January 16 | Left Knee Strain | 3 |
| LaMarcus Aldridge | January 19 | January 24 | Radial Collateral Ligament Tear in Left Thumb | 2 |
| Nicolas Batum | January 22 | January 28 | Sprained Right Wrist | 1 |
| Wesley Matthews | March 5 | Season | Torn Left Achilles | 22 |

== Roster ==
2014–15 Portland Trail Blazers roster
Players

| Pos. | No. | Player | Height | Weight | DOB | From |
|---|---|---|---|---|---|---|
| G/F | 4 | Arron Afflalo | 6 ft 5 in (1.96 m) | 215 lb (98 kg) | 1985–10–15 | UCLA |
| F/C | 12 | LaMarcus Aldridge | 6 ft 11 in (2.11 m) | 240 lb (109 kg) | 1985–07–19 | Texas |
| G/F | 88 | Nicolas Batum | 6 ft 8 in (2.03 m) | 200 lb (91 kg) | 1988–12–14 | France |
| G | 5 | Steve Blake | 6 ft 3 in (1.91 m) | 172 lb (78 kg) | 1980–02–26 | Maryland |
| G | 23 | Allen Crabbe | 6 ft 6 in (1.98 m) | 210 lb (95 kg) | 1992–04–04 | California |
| G | 10 | Tim Frazier | 6 ft 1 in (1.85 m) | 175 lb (79 kg) | 1990–11–01 | Penn State |
| F/C | 19 | Joel Freeland | 6 ft 10 in (2.08 m) | 225 lb (102 kg) | 1987–02–07 | FCOT |
| G/F | 33 | Alonzo Gee | 6 ft 6 in (1.98 m) | 225 lb (102 kg) | 1987–05–29 | Alabama |
| C | 35 | Chris Kaman | 7 ft 0 in (2.13 m) | 265 lb (120 kg) | 1982–04–28 | Central Michigan |
| C | 11 | Meyers Leonard | 7 ft 1 in (2.16 m) | 245 lb (111 kg) | 1992–02–27 | Illinois |
| G | 0 | Damian Lillard | 6 ft 3 in (1.91 m) | 195 lb (88 kg) | 1990–07–15 | Weber State |
| C | 42 | Robin Lopez | 7 ft 0 in (2.13 m) | 255 lb (116 kg) | 1988–04–01 | Stanford |
| G | 2 | Wesley Matthews | 6 ft 5 in (1.96 m) | 220 lb (100 kg) | 1986–10–14 | Marquette |
| G | 3 | CJ McCollum | 6 ft 4 in (1.93 m) | 200 lb (91 kg) | 1991–09–19 | Lehigh |
| F | 1 | Dorell Wright | 6 ft 9 in (2.06 m) | 205 lb (93 kg) | 1985–12–02 | South Kent (CT) |

Coaches
Head coach
- Terry Stotts
Assistant(s)
- Kim Hughes
- Dale Osbourne
- Nate Tibbetts
- Jay Triano
- David Vanterpool
- Chris Stackpole (player development)

Legend
- (DP) Unsigned draft pick
- (FA) Free agent
- (S) Suspended
- (DL) On assignment to D-League affiliate
- Injured

Roster
Updated: 2015–03–30

== Transactions ==
=== Free agents ===
==== Re-signed ====
| Player | Signed | Contract |
|---|---|---|
| CJ McCollum | 3rd year team option for the 2015–16 season picked up | $2.5 million |
| Meyers Leonard | 4th year team option for the 2015–16 season picked up | $3 million |

==== Additions ====
| Player | Signed | Former team |
|---|---|---|
| Steve Blake | Signed 2-year deal worth $4.2 million with 2nd year player option during offseason | Golden State Warriors |
| Chris Kaman | Signed 2-year deal worth $9.8 million with 2nd year team option during offseason | Los Angeles Lakers |

==== Subtractions ====
| Player | Reason left | New team |
|---|---|---|
| Mo Williams | Opted out of player-option, was not re-signed | Minnesota Timberwolves |
| Earl Watson | Retired | Retired |

== Awards ==
| Player | Award | Date awarded | Ref. |
|---|---|---|---|
| Damian Lillard | Western Conference Player of the Week | Nov. 17 | |
| LaMarcus Aldridge | Western Conference Player of the Week | Dec. 8 | |
| LaMarcus Aldridge | Western Conference Player of the Week | Dec. 22 | |
| Terry Stotts | Western Conference Coach of the Month | Jan. 5 | |
