= Allen Crabbe =

American basketball player (born 1992)

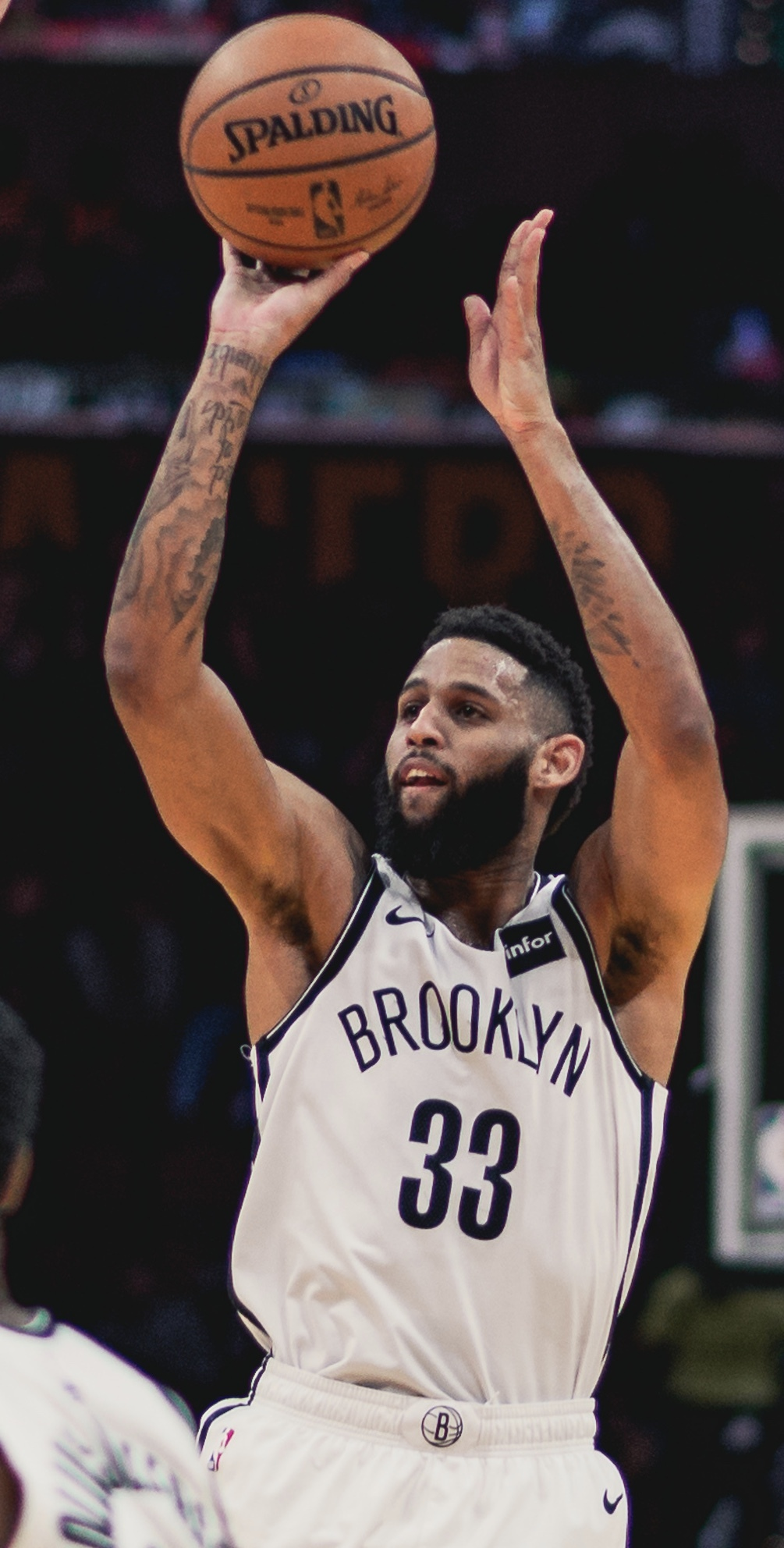
- Crabbe with the Brooklyn Nets in February 2019

Personal information
- Born: April 9, 1992 (age 34) Los Angeles, California, U.S.
- Listed height: 6 ft 5 in (1.96 m)
- Listed weight: 212 lb (96 kg)

Career information
- High school: Price (Los Angeles, California)
- College: California (2010–2013)
- NBA draft: 2013: 2nd round, 31st overall pick
- Drafted by: Cleveland Cavaliers
- Playing career: 2013–2022
- Position: Shooting guard / small forward
- Number: 23, 33, 9

Career history
- 2013–2017: Portland Trail Blazers
- 2014: →Idaho Stampede
- 2017–2019: Brooklyn Nets
- 2019–2020: Atlanta Hawks
- 2020: Minnesota Timberwolves
- 2022: Westchester Knicks

Career highlights
- Third-team All-American – NABC, SN (2013); Pac-12 Player of the Year (2013); 2× First-team All-Pac-12 (2012, 2013); Pac-12 Freshman of the Year (2011); Fourth-team Parade All-American (2010); California Mr. Basketball (2010)
- Stats at NBA.com
- Stats at Basketball Reference

Allen Lester Crabbe III (born April 9, 1992) is an American former professional basketball player who played for seven seasons in the National Basketball Association (NBA). He previously played college basketball for the California Golden Bears. He earned third-team All-American honors as a junior, when he was also named the conference player of the year in the Pac-12. Crabbe was selected in the second round of the 2013 NBA draft by the Cleveland Cavaliers.

== High school career ==
Crabbe attended Price High School in Los Angeles, California, a school founded by his grandfather, Frederick K. C. Price. While at the small school, Crabbe was named Gatorade Player of the Year for California, Mr. Basketball for the state, and a fourth-team Parade All-American, leading the team to a Division IV state title. In 2018, he made a large donation to keep the school open.

== College career ==
Crabbe committed to play college basketball for coach Mike Montgomery at Cal. In his first season, he averaged 13.4 points and 5.3 rebounds per game and was named Pac-12 Freshman of the Year.

Prior to his sophomore year, Crabbe was named to the preseason watch list for the Wooden Award. He averaged 15.2 points and 5.7 rebounds per game and remained one of the top shooters in the conference, shooting 39.9 percent from three-point range and 84.3 percent from the free throw line. At the close of the season, Crabbe was named to the first team All-Pac-12 Conference.

In his junior year, was again named to All-Pac-12 first team while also being voted Pac-12 Player of the Year. He also received national recognition as a third team All-American by both The Sporting News and the National Association of Basketball Coaches.

== Professional career ==
=== Portland Trail Blazers (2013–2017) ===
On June 27, 2013, the Cleveland Cavaliers selected Crabbe with the 31st overall pick in 2013 NBA draft. He was later traded on draft night to the Portland Trail Blazers for two future second-round picks. On March 10, 2014, he was assigned to the Idaho Stampede of the NBA Development League. He was recalled by the Trail Blazers on March 16, reassigned on March 25, and recalled again on March 31.

On November 11, 2014, Crabbe made his first career NBA start in a 102–100 win over the Charlotte Hornets. On April 11, 2015, he scored a season-high 11 points in a loss to the Utah Jazz.

On December 1, 2015, Crabbe scored a then-career-high 18 points in an overtime loss to the Dallas Mavericks. He topped that mark with 19 points on December 21 against the Atlanta Hawks, and again with 26 points on December 26 in a 105–76 win over the Cleveland Cavaliers.

After the 2015–16 season, Crabbe became a restricted free agent. On July 7, 2016, he received a four-year, $75 million offer sheet from the Brooklyn Nets. The Trail Blazers decided to match the offer and re-signed Crabbe on July 13. On January 8, 2017, he scored a career-high 30 points in a 125–124 double-overtime loss to the Detroit Pistons, becoming the first Portland player to score 30 off the bench since Jamal Crawford had 34 on April 11, 2012. On April 6, 2017, he had 25 points, including a career-high eight 3-pointers, in a 105–98 win over the Minnesota Timberwolves.

=== Brooklyn Nets (2017–2019) ===
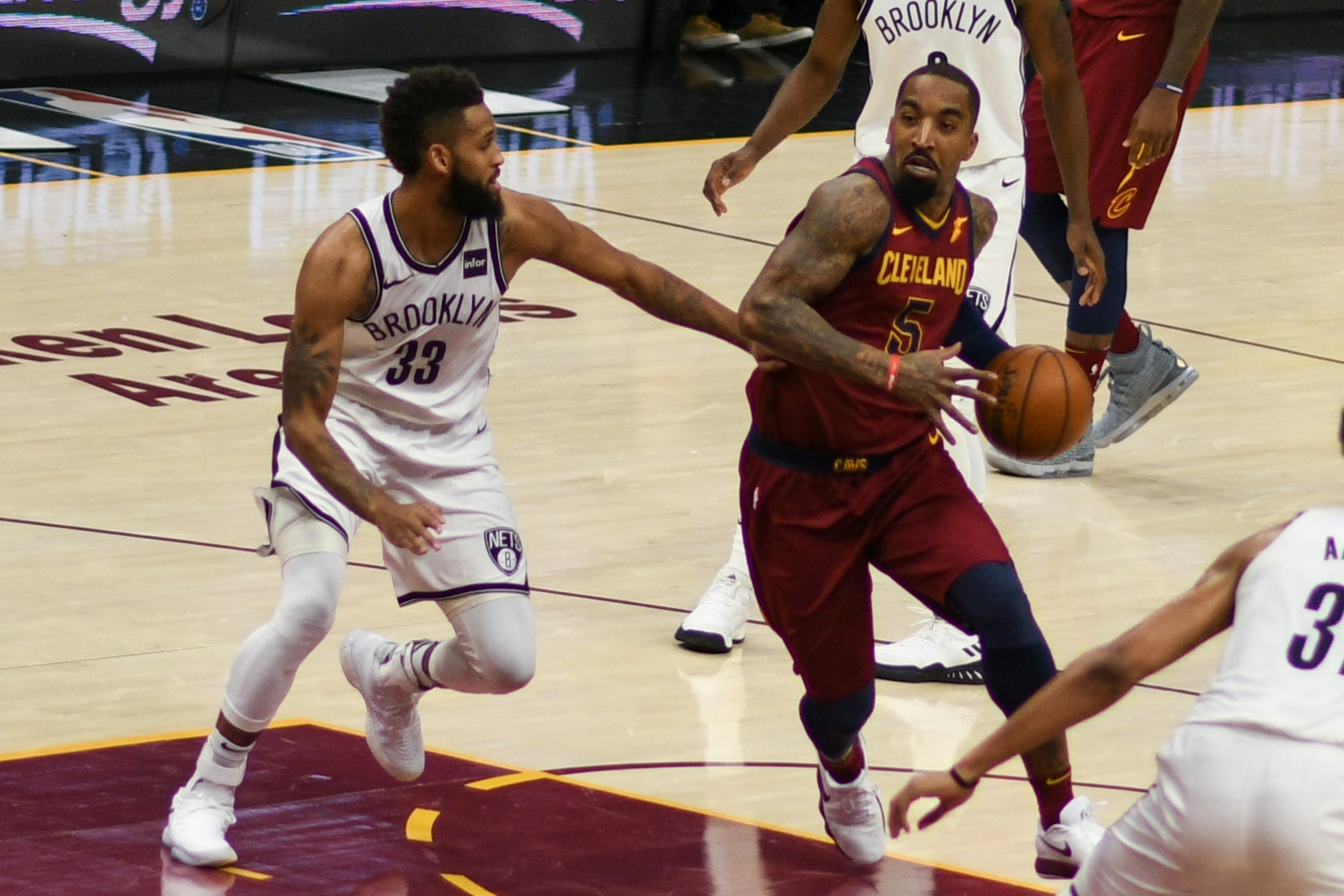
Crabbe defending J. R. Smith in February 2018

On July 25, 2017, Crabbe was traded to the Brooklyn Nets in exchange for Andrew Nicholson. In his debut for the Nets in their season opener on October 18, Crabbe scored 12 points in a 140–131 loss to the Indiana Pacers. On February 7, he had 19 of his 34 points in the fourth quarter of the Nets' 115–106 loss to the Detroit Pistons. Three days later, he made eight 3-pointers and scored 28 points in a 138–128 double-overtime loss to the New Orleans Pelicans. On February 22, in a 111–96 loss to the Charlotte Hornets, Crabbe hit his 140th 3-pointer of the season, moving him into sole possession of seventh place in Nets single-season history. On March 8, he made his first six 3-pointers and had 29 points and eight rebounds in a 125–111 win over the Charlotte Hornets. On April 9, on his 26th birthday, Crabbe scored 20 of his career-high 41 points in the first quarter of the Nets' 114–105 win over the Chicago Bulls. In the Nets' season finale on April 11, Crabbe scored 16 points in a 110–97 loss to the Boston Celtics. He hit five 3-pointers, extending his Nets' single-season record to 201—Deron Williams is next on the list with 169 in 2012–13.

On November 21, 2018, Crabbe scored a season-high 27 points in a 119–113 loss to the Dallas Mavericks. He was 10-of-16 from the field, including 7-of-11 behind the arc, after coming into the game shooting 27 percent. On December 5, he scored 22 points and tied a season high with seven 3-pointers in a 114–112 loss to the Oklahoma City Thunder. On February 6, 2019, he returned to action against the Denver Nuggets after missing 26 games with a sore right knee. On April 4, he underwent successful right knee arthroscopy after missing nine straight contests and 35 of the previous 50 games.

=== Atlanta Hawks (2019–2020) ===
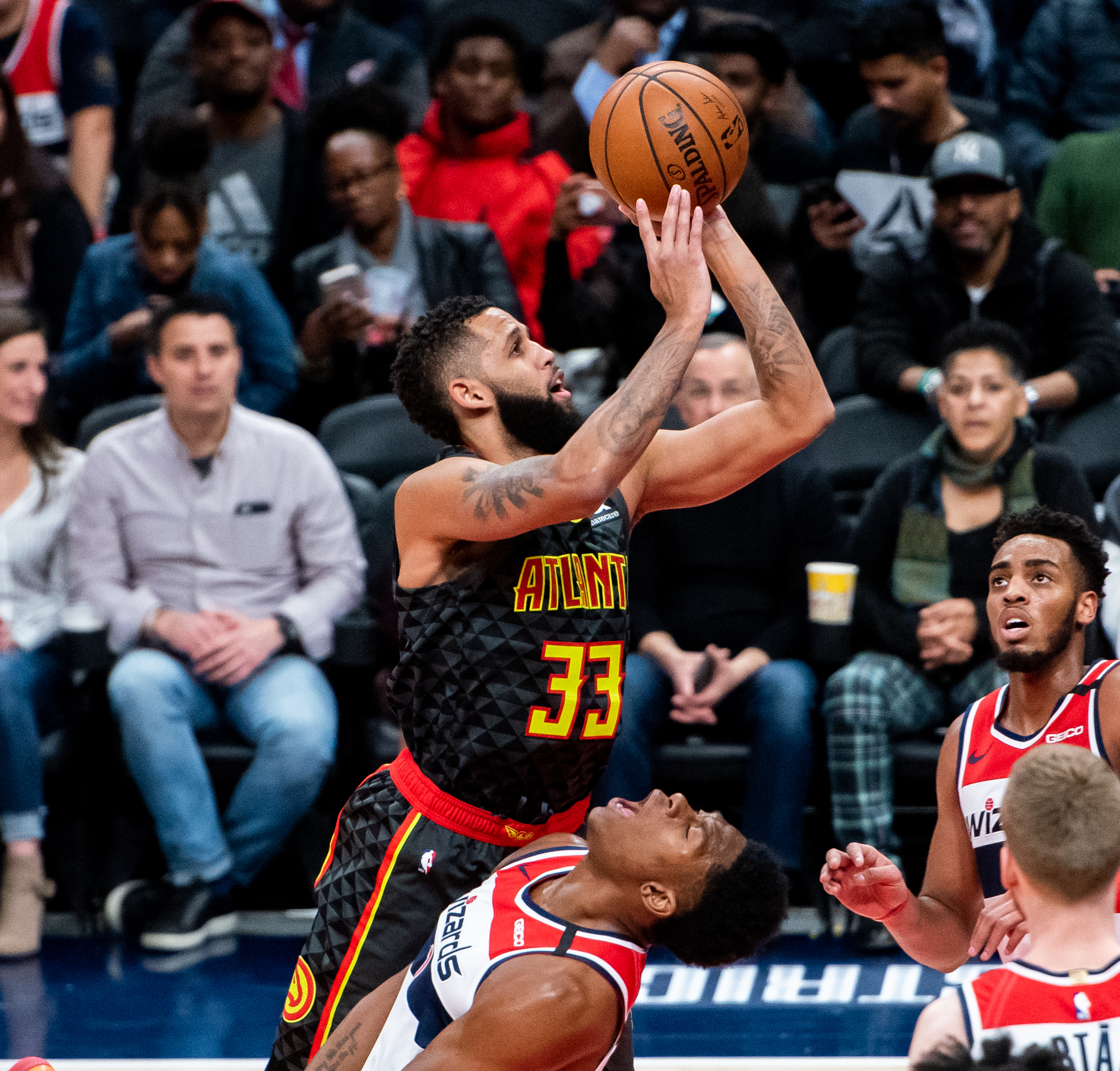
Crabbe in 2020

On July 6, 2019, Crabbe, the draft rights to Nickeil Alexander-Walker, and a 2020 first-round pick, were traded by the Nets to the Atlanta Hawks in exchange for Taurean Prince and a 2021 second-round pick.

=== Minnesota Timberwolves (2020) ===
On January 16, 2020, the Hawks traded Crabbe to the Minnesota Timberwolves in exchange for Treveon Graham and Jeff Teague. On February 29, Crabbe was waived.

=== Westchester Knicks (2022) ===
On January 22, 2022, Crabbe was acquired via waivers by the Westchester Knicks of the NBA G League.

== Career statistics ==
Legend
GP	Games played	GS	Games started	MPG	Minutes per game
FG%	Field goal percentage	3P%	3-point field goal percentage	FT%	Free throw percentage
RPG	Rebounds per game	APG	Assists per game	SPG	Steals per game
BPG	Blocks per game	PPG	Points per game	**Bold**	Career high

=== NBA ===
==== Regular season ====
Year	Team	GP	GS	MPG	FG%	3P%	FT%	RPG	APG	SPG	BPG	PPG
2013–14	Portland	15	0	6.7	.364	.429	.750	.6	.4	.1	.1	2.2
2014–15	Portland	51	9	13.4	.412	.353	.750	1.4	.8	.4	.3	3.3
2015–16	Portland	**81**	8	26.0	.459	.393	**.867**	2.7	1.2	**.8**	.2	10.3
2016–17	Portland	79	7	28.5	**.468**	**.444**	.847	2.9	1.2	.7	.3	10.7
2017–18	Brooklyn	75	**68**	**29.3**	.407	.378	.852	**4.3**	**1.6**	.6	**.5**	**13.2**
2018–19	Brooklyn	43	20	26.3	.367	.378	.732	3.4	1.1	.5	.3	9.6
2019–20	Atlanta	28	1	18.6	.364	.323	.750	2.3	1.0	.5	.1	5.1
2019–20	Minnesota	9	0	14.6	.324	.231	.500	1.3	.6	.0	.0	3.2
Career		381	113	24.0	.425	.387	.831	2.8	1.1	.6	.3	9.1

==== Playoffs ====
Year	Team	GP	GS	MPG	FG%	3P%	FT%	RPG	APG	SPG	BPG	PPG
2015	Portland	2	**1**	19.5	**.800**	**1.000**	.000	1.5	.5	**1.0**	**.5**	5.0
2016	Portland	**11**	0	**27.5**	.521	.429	**.737**	2.9	**1.4**	.6	.1	**9.5**
2017	Portland	4	0	23.0	.375	.231	.333	**3.3**	.5	.3	.0	5.5
Career		17	1	25.5	.500	.400	.682	2.8	1.1	.6	.1	8.1

=== College ===
Year	Team	GP	GS	MPG	FG%	3P%	FT%	RPG	APG	SPG	BPG	PPG
2010–11	California	31	31	33.8	.446	**.400**	.804	5.3	2.0	.9	.5	13.4
2011–12	California	**34**	**33**	34.1	.431	.399	**.843**	5.7	2.1	.5	.6	15.2
2012–13	California	33	**33**	**36.2**	**.459**	.348	.813	**6.1**	**2.6**	**1.1**	**.7**	**18.4**
Career		98	97	34.7	.446	.382	.819	5.7	2.2	.9	.6	15.7
