= Steve Blake =

American basketball player (born 1980)

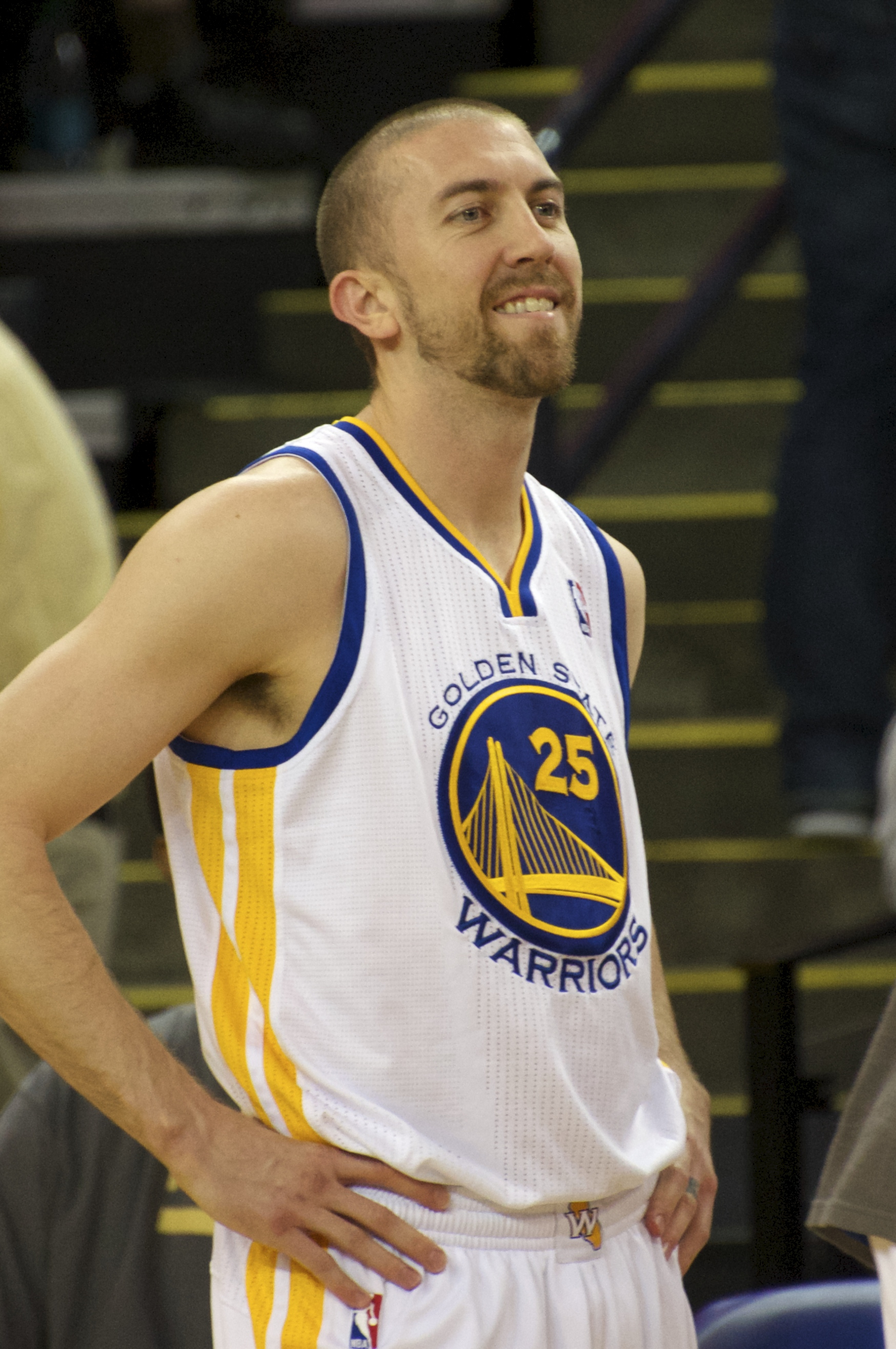
- Blake with the Golden State Warriors in 2014

Personal information
- Born: February 26, 1980 (age 46) Hollywood, Florida, U.S.
- Listed height: 6 ft 3 in (1.91 m)
- Listed weight: 172 lb (78 kg)

Career information
- High school: Miami Killian (Miami, Florida); Miami (Miami, Florida); Oak Hill Academy (Mouth of Wilson, Virginia)
- College: Maryland (1999–2003)
- NBA draft: 2003: 2nd round, 38th overall pick
- Drafted by: Washington Wizards
- Playing career: 2003–2016
- Position: Point guard
- Number: 2, 5, 25, 22
- Coaching career: 2018–present

Career history

Playing
- 2003–2005: Washington Wizards
- 2005–2006: Portland Trail Blazers
- 2006–2007: Milwaukee Bucks
- 2007: Denver Nuggets
- 2007–2010: Portland Trail Blazers
- 2010: Los Angeles Clippers
- 2010–2014: Los Angeles Lakers
- 2014: Golden State Warriors
- 2014–2015: Portland Trail Blazers
- 2015–2016: Detroit Pistons
- 2016: Sydney Kings

Coaching
- 2018–2019: Portland Trail Blazers (assistant)
- 2019–2020: Phoenix Suns (assistant)

Career highlights
- NCAA champion (2002); First-team All-ACC (2003); Third-team All-ACC (2002)
- Stats at NBA.com
- Stats at Basketball Reference
Medals
Men's basketball
Representing United States
FIBA Americas U18 Championship
Gold medal – first place	1998 Puerto Plata	Team competition

Steven Hanson Blake (born February 26, 1980) is an American professional basketball coach and former player. After winning the 2002 NCAA Championship with Maryland, Blake was selected by the Washington Wizards with the 38th overall pick in the 2003 NBA draft. Over his 13-year NBA career, Blake had stints with the Wizards, Milwaukee Bucks, Denver Nuggets, Los Angeles Clippers, Los Angeles Lakers, Golden State Warriors, Detroit Pistons, and three stints with the Portland Trail Blazers.

== High school career ==
Blake spent his freshman and sophomore year at Miami Killian High School and then transferred to Miami High School, where he played with another future NBA player, Udonis Haslem. Miami won consecutive state championships, but after the Miami New Times exposed the fact that Blake and other players, under head coach Frank Martin (himself later an NCAA Final Four coach), were using fake addresses to enroll in the school, the Stingarees were forced to forfeit their entire 1998 schedule. After the FHSAA banned him from playing for any public high school in Florida again, Blake attended Oak Hill Academy before enrolling at the University of Maryland.

== College career ==
After high school, Blake attended the University of Maryland. Blake was the team's starter from the first game of his freshman year and was the first ACC player to compile 1,000 points, 800 assists, 400 rebounds and 200 steals. He finished his career 5th in NCAA all-time career assists with 972. Widely known for his superb passing ability, Blake helped lead the Terrapins to a Final Four appearance (2001) and the 2002 NCAA championship; less well known for his scoring, Blake did average 11.6 points per game in his senior year. He averaged over six assists per game in each of his four years, including averages of 7.9 and 7.1 in 2002 and 2003, respectively. For his efforts, he was named to a variety of all-ACC teams during his career, including the rookie and defensive squads, capped by a first-team All-ACC spot his senior year. At the start of the 2003–04 basketball season, Blake's uniform number (25) became only the 15th to be retired to the rafters of Maryland's Comcast Center.

== Professional career ==
=== Washington Wizards (2003–2005) ===
Blake was selected by the Washington Wizards with the 38th pick in the 2003 NBA draft. He averaged 5.9 points, 2.8 assists, and 18.6 minutes per game while playing in 75 games his rookie season with the Wizards. In his second season Blake's playing time decreased to 14.7 minutes and only 44 games played.

=== Portland Trail Blazers (2005–2006) ===
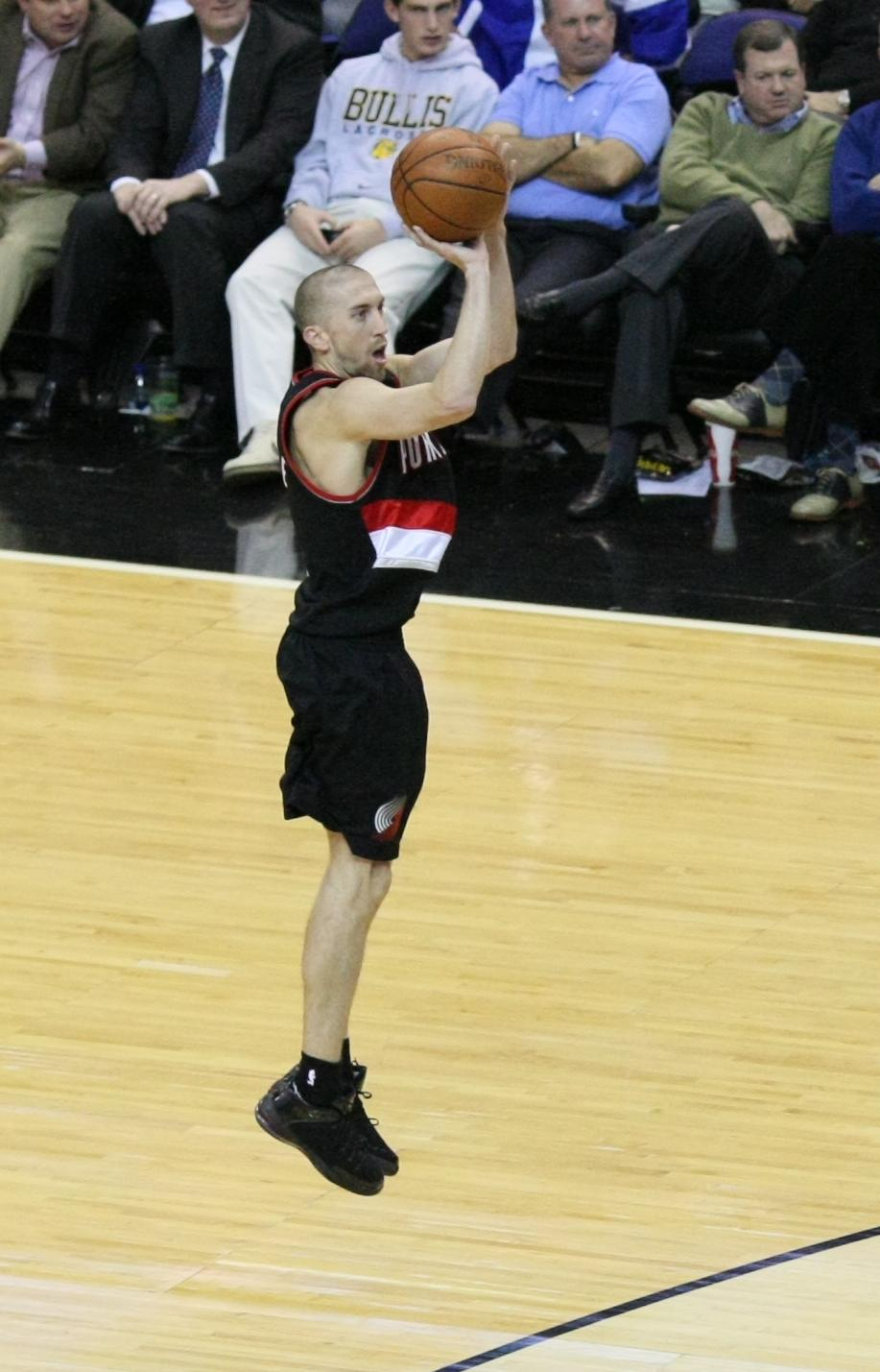
Blake with the Portland Trail Blazers

In September 2005, Blake (then a restricted free agent with the Wizards) was offered a contract by the Portland Trail Blazers, which the Wizards declined to match. This became the second reunion with former Maryland Terrapin and Washington Wizards backcourt teammate Juan Dixon, who also signed with the Trail Blazers in the 2005 off-season.

In Blake's first season with the Blazers, he became a starter and played a significant role when Sebastian Telfair was injured. Blake's playing time increased from 14.7 minutes and 44 games with only one start in 2004–05 to 26.2 minutes and 68 games with 57 starts in 05–06. Blake reestablished himself as a terrific passer and fundamental point guard claiming third in the NBA in assist-to-turnover ratio. He also increased his field goal percentage by 11%.

=== Milwaukee Bucks (2006–2007) ===
In July 2006, Blake was traded (along with Brian Skinner and Ha Seung-Jin) to the Milwaukee Bucks for Jamaal Magloire.

=== Denver Nuggets (2007) ===
On January 11, 2007, Blake was traded to the Denver Nuggets in return for Earl Boykins and Julius Hodge. Blake started in 40 of the 50 remaining games of the Nuggets' 2006–07 season, and in five playoff games in a 4–1 first-round loss to the San Antonio Spurs.

=== Second Portland Trail Blazers stint (2007–2010) ===
Blake became an unrestricted free agent on July 1, 2007, and agreed to a three-year deal with the Portland Trail Blazers on July 13, 2007.

The 2008–09 season saw a rise in Blake's numbers. Through his first 38 games, he averaged a career-high 11.7 points per game, while also achieving career highs in free throw percentage and three-point percentage.

On February 22, 2009, Blake tied an NBA record with 14 assists in the first quarter of a game against the Los Angeles Clippers.

=== Los Angeles Clippers (2010) ===
On February 17, 2010, Blake was traded to the Los Angeles Clippers with Travis Outlaw and $1.5 million in cash for Marcus Camby.

=== Los Angeles Lakers (2010–2014) ===
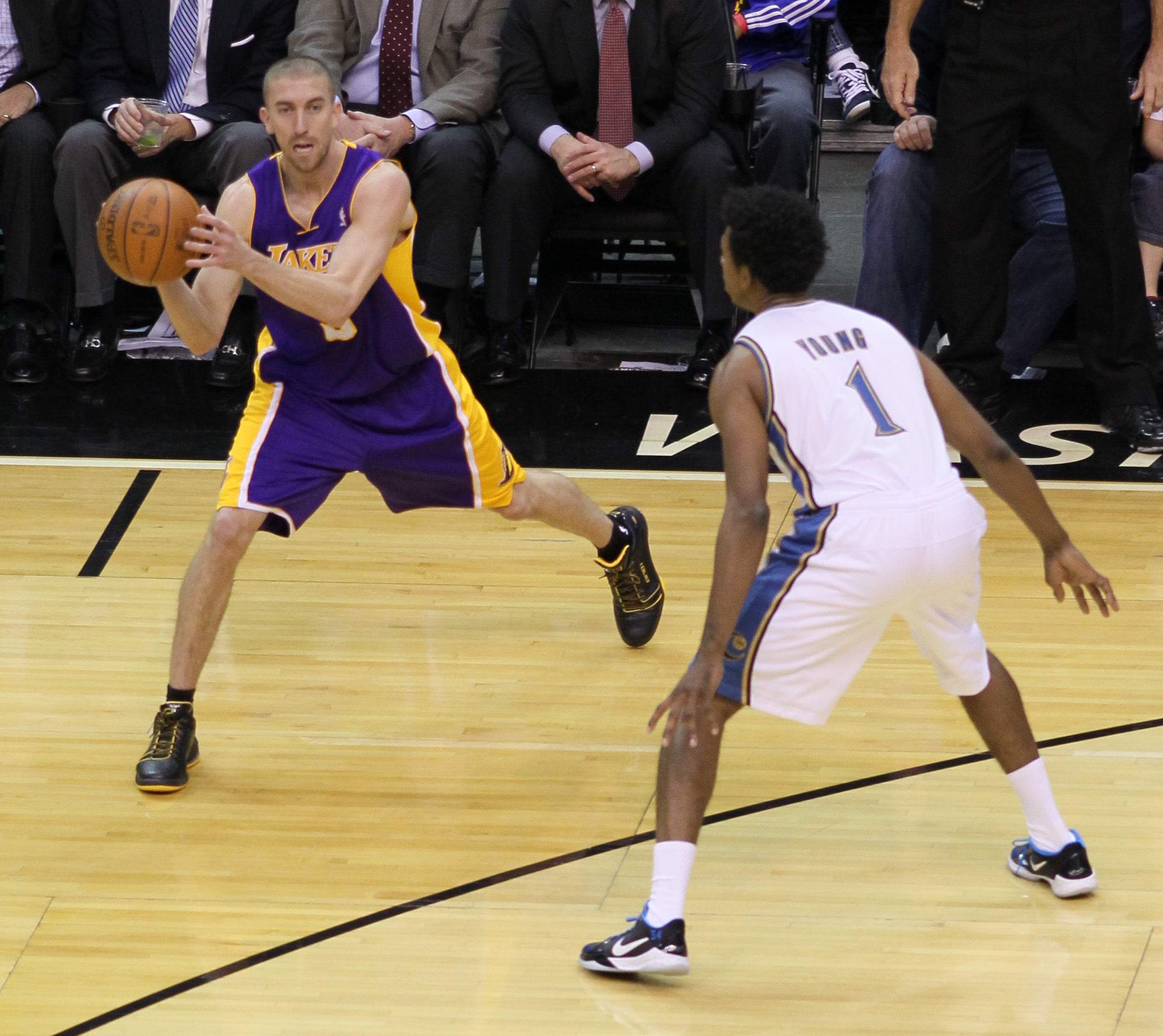
Blake being guarded by Nick Young of the Washington Wizards

On July 8, 2010, Blake officially signed a four-year $16 million contract with the Los Angeles Lakers. In his first season for the Lakers, Blake averaged 4 points in 20 minutes per game. He missed games due to chicken pox. In his second season, he averaged 5.2 points in 23.2 minutes per game. He also played 5 of 53 games as a starter. He dealt with a costochondral fracture (fractured cartilage connecting the rib to the sternum). Statistically, he was a disappointment in those first two seasons under coach Phil Jackson's triangle offense and then coach Mike Brown's post-up offense, neither of which catered to his natural read-and-react skills.

In the 2012–13 season, his training camp was spoiled when he punctured his foot stepping on a spike strip in a beach parking lot. In November 2012, Blake was fined $25,000 by the NBA for inappropriate language towards a fan. He started five straight games after a knee injury to starter Steve Nash. However, Blake was sidelined starting in November after suffering an abdominal strain that required surgery. He experienced groin problems during his recovery before returning in late January after missing 37 games. He was more comfortable playing under coach Mike D'Antoni, who had replaced Brown early in the season. In the playoffs that season, Blake left Game 2 in the first round against San Antonio after injuring his right hamstring and was declared out indefinitely.

=== Golden State Warriors (2014) ===
On February 19, 2014, Blake was traded to the Golden State Warriors in exchange for MarShon Brooks and Kent Bazemore.

=== Third Portland Trail Blazers stint (2014–2015) ===
On July 10, 2014, Blake signed with the Portland Trail Blazers to a reported two-year, $4.2 million deal. On February 20, 2015, Blake changed his jersey number from #25 to #5 in a tribute to Jerome Kersey who died two days prior.

On June 19, 2015, Blake exercised his player option with the Trail Blazers for the 2015–16 season.

=== Detroit Pistons (2015–2016) ===
On June 25, 2015, Blake was traded, along with the draft rights to Rondae Hollis-Jefferson, to the Brooklyn Nets in exchange for Mason Plumlee and the draft rights to Pat Connaughton. On July 13, 2015, he was traded to the Detroit Pistons in exchange for Quincy Miller.

Blake's final NBA game was played in Game 4 of the 2016 Eastern Conference First Round on April 26, 2016. The Pistons would lose the game 98–100 to the Cleveland Cavaliers with Blake recording 3 points, 2 assists and 1 rebound.

=== Sydney Kings (2016) ===
On October 22, 2016, Blake signed with the Sydney Kings for the rest of the 2016–17 NBL season. He made his debut for the Kings on October 30, recording 12 points, four rebounds, four assists and two steals in an 87–78 win over the Brisbane Bullets. On November 28, he was granted leave by the Kings and returned to the United States indefinitely to address a private family matter. On December 6, Blake announced that he would not be returning to Sydney, effectively ending his stint with the Kings. In nine games for the Kings, he averaged 5.9 points, 2.3 rebounds and 2.2 assists per game.

== Coaching career ==
=== Portland Trail Blazers (2017–2019) ===
On September 27, 2017, Blake was reported to have joined the Portland Trail Blazers as a coaching intern. For the 2018–19 season, Blake was promoted to an on-court assistant for the Trail Blazers.

=== Phoenix Suns (2019–2020) ===
On June 26, 2019, Blake was hired as an assistant coach for the Phoenix Suns. On July 18, 2020, Suns head coach Monty Williams announced that Blake was no longer with the team.

== NBA career statistics ==
Legend
GP	Games played	GS	Games started	MPG	Minutes per game
FG%	Field goal percentage	3P%	3-point field goal percentage	FT%	Free throw percentage
RPG	Rebounds per game	APG	Assists per game	SPG	Steals per game
BPG	Blocks per game	PPG	Points per game	**Bold**	Career high
*	Led the league

=== Regular season ===
Year	Team	GP	GS	MPG	FG%	3P%	FT%	RPG	APG	SPG	BPG	PPG
2003–04	Washington	75	14	18.6	.386	.371	.821	1.6	2.8	.8	.1	5.9
2004–05	Washington	44	1	14.7	.328	.387	.805	1.6	1.6	.3	.0	4.3
2005–06	Portland	68	57	26.2	.438	.413	.791	2.1	4.5	.6	.1	8.2
2006–07	Milwaukee	33	2	17.7	.349	.279	.550	1.4	2.5	.3	.1	3.6
2006–07	Denver	49	40	**33.5**	.432	.343	.727	2.5	6.6	1.0	.1	8.3
2007–08	Portland	81	**78**	29.9	.408	.406	.766	2.4	5.1	.7	.0	8.5
2008–09	Portland	69	69	31.7	.428	.427	.840	2.5	5.0	1.0	.1	**11.0**
2009–10	Portland	51	28	27.4	.403	.377	.750	2.3	4.0	.7	.0	7.6
2009–10	L.A. Clippers	29	10	26.3	**.443**	**.437**	.750	2.4	6.1	.7	.1	6.8
2010–11	L.A. Lakers	79	0	20.0	.359	.378	**.867**	2.0	2.2	.5	.0	4.0
2011–12	L.A. Lakers	53	5	23.3	.377	.335	.778	1.6	3.3	.7	.0	5.2
2012–13	L.A. Lakers	45	13	26.1	.422	.421	.771	2.9	3.8	.8	.1	7.3
2013–14	L.A. Lakers	27	27	33.0	.378	.397	.800	**3.8**	**7.6**	**1.3**	.1	9.5
2013–14	Golden State	28	1	21.7	.375	.342	.625	2.0	3.6	.7	**.2**	4.4
2014–15	Portland	**81**	0	18.9	.373	.352	.707	1.7	3.6	.5	.1	4.3
2015–16	Detroit	58	2	17.0	.388	.344	.800	1.5	3.4	.4	.1	4.4
Career		870	347	23.9	.401	.383	.779	2.1	4.0	.7	.1	6.5

=== Playoffs ===
Year	Team	GP	GS	MPG	FG%	3P%	FT%	RPG	APG	SPG	BPG	PPG
2005	Washington	4	0	4.3	.250	.000	.000	.8	.5	.0	.0	.5
2007	Denver	5	5	36.0	.452	**.500**	.000	2.4	4.6	.6	.0	7.2
2009	Portland	6	**6**	**38.5**	**.489**	.417	.714	**4.0**	**6.2**	.8	.0	9.8
2011	L.A. Lakers	9	0	16.1	.304	.333	.000	1.6	2.2	.6	.0	2.2
2012	L.A. Lakers	**12**	0	25.5	.419	.419	.714	2.8	2.3	.7	.2	6.3
2013	L.A. Lakers	2	2	37.5	.393	.417	**1.000**	**4.0**	2.5	**2.0**	**1.5**	**14.0**
2014	Golden State	6	0	7.5	.333	.300	.000	.7	.3	.0	.0	1.8
2015	Portland	5	0	8.6	.182	.125	**1.000**	.2	1.6	.0	.2	1.4
2016	Detroit	4	0	10.8	.200	**.500**	.500	1.0	2.5	.0	.0	1.0
Career		53	13	20.5	.398	.388	.700	2.0	2.5	.5	.1	4.6

== See also ==
- List of NCAA Division I men's basketball career assists leaders
