= Joel Freeland =

British basketball player (born 1987)

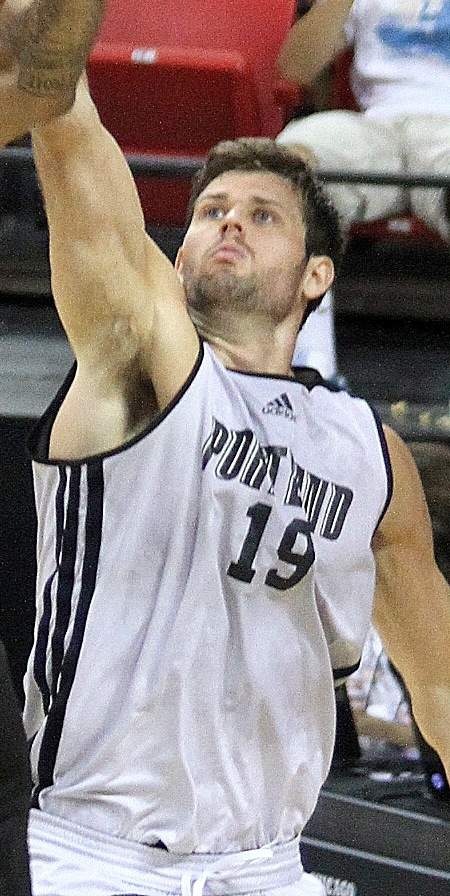
- Freeland with the Portland Trail Blazers in 2013

Personal information
- Born: 7 February 1987 (age 39) Farnham, Surrey, England, UK
- Listed height: 6 ft 11 in (2.11 m)
- Listed weight: 248 lb (112 kg)

Career information
- College: Farnborough College of Technology
- NBA draft: 2006: 1st round, 30th overall pick
- Drafted by: Portland Trail Blazers
- Playing career: 2005–2017
- Position: Power forward / center

Career history
- 2005–2006: Gran Canaria B
- 2006–2009: Gran Canaria
- 2009–2012: Unicaja Málaga
- 2012–2015: Portland Trail Blazers
- 2012: →Idaho Stampede
- 2015–2017: CSKA Moscow

Career highlights
- EuroLeague champion (2016); 2× VTB United League champion (2016, 2017)
- Stats at NBA.com
- Stats at Basketball Reference

Joel Daniel Freeland (born 7 February 1987) is a British former professional basketball player who last played for CSKA Moscow of the VTB United League. Standing at 2.10 m (6 ft 10 1/2 in), he played at the power forward and center positions. He also represented the Great Britain national basketball team.

== Professional career ==
=== Early years ===
Freeland began his career as a youth player with the youth teams of Thames Valley Tigers/Guildford Heat, before joining the Solent Stars. Within a year, he was representing England's Under-18 national team, and soon found himself in Spain, with the fourth division side Gran Canaria II. While playing in the lower level Spanish leagues, Freeland was drafted by the Portland Trail Blazers, becoming the 30th overall pick of the 2006 NBA draft, which was the highest rank for a British born player in the history of the draft. The Blazers encouraged Freeland to remain in Europe to learn his trade, and he subsequently signed with Gran Canaria, of the Spanish top-tier level Liga ACB in August 2006.

During the 2006–07 season, while playing with Gran Canaria, Freeland appeared in 16 games in the Liga ACB, and also made his debut in the European-wide 2nd-tier level ULEB Cup (now called EuroCup). Freeland continued to improve during the 2007–08 season, appearing in 28 games in the Liga ACB, and reaching the quarter-finals of the ULEB Cup. The 2008–09 season saw Freeland become one of Gran Canaria's best players, as he averaged 9.9 points and 4.8 rebounds per game, in 17.8 minutes per game in the Liga ACB.

=== Unicaja Malaga ===
In July 2009, Freeland joined the Spanish EuroLeague club Unicaja Málaga, on a five-year contract worth €4.5 million euros net income. During the 2009–10 season, Freeland made his debut in Europe's top-tier level league, the EuroLeague, and also made 37 Spanish ACB League appearances. The 2010–11 season was Freeland's best season, as he averaged career-highs of 13.2 points and 6.2 rebounds per game in the Liga ACB, and 13.9 points and 6.3 rebounds per game in the EuroLeague.

In July 2012, Freeland reached an agreement with Unicaja on a €1.5 million buyout.

=== Portland Trail Blazers ===
On 28 June 2006, he was selected by the Portland Trail Blazers in the first round of the 2006 NBA draft as the 30th overall draft pick. However, the Trail Blazers encouraged him to return to European play to further improve his game. On 13 July 2012, Freeland signed a three-year deal with the Portland Trail Blazers. On 14 December 2012, he was assigned to the Idaho Stampede of the NBA D-League. He was recalled on 16 December 2012.

On 26 December 2014, Freeland recorded a career-high 17 rebounds against the Philadelphia 76ers. On 13 April 2015, he scored a career-high 16 points against the Oklahoma City Thunder.

=== CSKA Moscow ===
On 13 July 2015, Freeland signed a two-year contract with the Russian club CSKA Moscow. In a warm-up for a preseason game against Galatasaray, he suffered a left calf injury, which prevented him from play at the start of the season. During his two-year stint with CSKA, he won the EuroLeague in 2016 and was a two time VTB United League champion (2016, 2017). Following the expiration of his contract, he left the club at the end of the 2016–17 season.

== International ==
Freeland represented the senior Great Britain national basketball team at the EuroBasket 2009 and the EuroBasket 2011. He also played at the 2012 Summer Olympics.

== Career statistics ==
Legend
GP	Games played	GS	Games started	MPG	Minutes per game
FG%	Field-goal percentage	3P%	3-point field-goal percentage	FT%	Free-throw percentage
RPG	Rebounds per game	APG	Assists per game	SPG	Steals per game
BPG	Blocks per game	PPG	Points per game	PIR	Performance index rating
**Bold**	Career high

=== NBA ===
==== Regular season ====
Year	Team	GP	GS	MPG	FG%	3P%	FT%	RPG	APG	SPG	BPG	PPG
2012–13	Portland	51	1	9.4	.408	.000	.667	2.3	.3	**.3**	.2	2.6
2013–14	Portland	**52**	0	**14.0**	.475	.000	.690	**4.0**	**.7**	.2	.4	3.3
2014–15	Portland	48	**8**	12.9	**.490**	.000	**.840**	**4.0**	.3	.2	**.5**	**3.5**
Career		151	9	12.1	.459	.000	.728	3.4	.4	.2	.4	3.2

==== Playoffs ====
Year	Team	GP	GS	MPG	FG%	3P%	FT%	RPG	APG	SPG	BPG	PPG
2014	Portland	**9**	0	2.7	.000	.000	**.500**	**.9**	**.1**	.1	**.1**	**.1**
2015	Portland	2	0	**3.5**	.000	.000	.000	.5	.0	**.5**	.0	.0
Career		11	0	2.8	.000	.000	.500	.8	.1	.2	.1	.1

=== EuroLeague ===
†	Denotes seasons in which Freeland won the EuroLeague

Year	Team	GP	GS	MPG	FG%	3P%	FT%	RPG	APG	SPG	BPG	PPG	PIR
2009–10	Málaga	14	6	19.7	.484	.211	.667	5.1	.7	.4	.4	10.1	9.5
2010–11	Málaga	**15**	**14**	25.5	**.603**	**.273**	**.788**	6.3	**1.3**	**.7**	**.6**	**13.9**	**17.5**
2011–12	Málaga	14	12	**25.8**	.510	.250	.667	**6.8**	.6	.2	.1	12.6	11.4
2015–16†	CSKA Moscow	12	6	15.8	.593	—	.500	4.4	.3	.3	.4	6.8	7.6
2016–17	CSKA Moscow	**15**	4	5.2	.529	—	.385	1.2	.1	.2	.1	1.5	1.3
Career		70	42	18.4	.540	.239	.658	4.8	.6	.4	.3	9.0	9.5
