= Wesley Matthews =

American basketball player (born 1986)

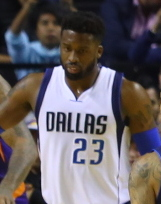
- Matthews with the Dallas Mavericks in 2017

Personal information
- Born: October 14, 1986 (age 40) San Antonio, Texas, U.S.
- Listed height: 6 ft 5 in (1.96 m)
- Listed weight: 220 lb (100 kg)

Career information
- High school: James Madison Memorial (Madison, Wisconsin)
- College: Marquette (2005–2009)
- NBA draft: 2009: undrafted
- Playing career: 2009–2024
- Position: Shooting guard / small forward
- Number: 23, 2, 9, 32

Career history
- 2009–2010: Utah Jazz
- 2010–2015: Portland Trail Blazers
- 2015–2019: Dallas Mavericks
- 2019: New York Knicks
- 2019: Indiana Pacers
- 2019–2020: Milwaukee Bucks
- 2020–2021: Los Angeles Lakers
- 2021–2023: Milwaukee Bucks
- 2023–2024: Atlanta Hawks

Career highlights
- Second-team All-Big East (2009); Wisconsin Mr. Basketball (2005)

Career NBA statistics
- Points: 11,210 (11.4 ppg)
- Rebounds: 2,757 (2.8 rpg)
- Assists: 1,843 (1.9 apg)
- Stats at NBA.com
- Stats at Basketball Reference

Wesley Joel Matthews Jr. (born October 14, 1986) is an American former professional basketball player, who played for 15 seasons in the National Basketball Association (NBA). He played college basketball for the Marquette Golden Eagles. He is the son of former NBA player Wes Matthews.

== Early life ==
Matthews was born in San Antonio, Texas to Wesley Sr., a former NBA point guard and two-time NBA champion with the 1987 and 1988 Los Angeles Lakers, and Pam Moore, an All-American runner and basketball player. Matthews starred on the James Madison Memorial High School basketball and soccer teams. He was named Wisconsin Mr. Basketball in 2005.

== College career ==
Matthews chose to attend Marquette University despite being pressured to play for the University of Wisconsin–Madison like his father.

Wesley was the biggest of the "three amigos", the three guards in the starting lineup for Marquette. This trio, Dominic James, Jerel McNeal, and Matthews, started nearly every game together from their first year onwards. With the lack of height in the 2008–09 season at Marquette, Matthews learned to play against bigger opponents. He grabbed 13 rebounds in a Marquette 48-point win over Division II opponent Lewis Flyers on December 28, 2005.

In a game against the Tennessee Volunteers on December 16, 2008, Matthews scored a career-high 30 points, making 15 of 18 free throws. On January 7, 2009, he set a school record for field goal accuracy (minimum 10 attempts) when he went 10-for-10 en route to 23 points in an 81–76 win over Rutgers.

== Professional basketball career ==
=== Utah Jazz (2009–2010) ===
After completing four years at Marquette, Matthews entered the 2009 NBA draft, but went undrafted. He joined the Utah Jazz for the Orlando Summer League and the Sacramento Kings for the Las Vegas Summer League. In September 2009, he signed a one-year deal with the Jazz. In February 2010, after the team's trade of Ronnie Brewer, head coach Jerry Sloan made Matthews the team's starting shooting guard. The following month, on March 14, Matthews scored a then-career-high 29 points, including six made three-point shots, in a 119–111 loss to the Oklahoma City Thunder.

On June 29, 2010, the Jazz extended Matthews the league-specified qualifying offer, thereby making him a restricted free agent and giving the Jazz the opportunity to match any other free agent offer.

=== Portland Trail Blazers (2010–2015) ===
On July 10, 2010, the Trail Blazers signed Matthews to a five-year, $34 million offer sheet. On July 21, 2010, following the Jazz's decision not to match the Trail Blazers' offer sheet, Matthews officially signed the five-year, $34 million contract.

In his first season with Portland, Matthews averaged 15.9 points per game, and his three-point shot improved from 38 percent to 41 percent. After Brandon Roy began missing time due to knee problems, Matthews gained a spot in the Blazers' starting lineup.

The durable Matthews played in 250 consecutive NBA games before being forced to sit out of a game on December 10, 2012, due to an injury to his left hip. Matthews' ability and willingness to play through minor injuries and pain earned him the nickname "Iron Man", an appellation used by Trail Blazers fans, television and radio commentators, and arena public address announcers alike.

On November 23, 2013, in a game against the Golden State Warriors, Matthews was involved in an altercation and was ejected along with teammate, Mo Williams. He scored 23 points in 25 minutes of action before leaving the game. On November 25 it was announced that he was fined $20,000.

On January 17, 2015, Matthews became the Trail Blazers all-time career leader in three-point field goals made, surpassing Terry Porter's franchise record of 773. On March 5, 2015, in a game against the Dallas Mavericks, Matthews tore his left achilles tendon and was subsequently ruled out for the rest of the season.

=== Dallas Mavericks (2015–2019) ===
On July 9, 2015, Matthews signed a four-year, $70 million deal with the Dallas Mavericks. On December 6, 2015, he scored 28 of his season-high 36 points in the second half of the Mavericks' 116–104 win over the Washington Wizards. He hit 10 three-pointers in the game, with eight of them coming in the second half.

On November 30, 2016, Matthews scored a season-high 26 points in a 94–87 loss to the San Antonio Spurs. He tied that mark three times in early December. Matthews set a new season high on February 3, 2017, scoring 27 points in a 108–104 win over the Portland Trail Blazers.

On November 18, 2017, Matthews scored a season-high 22 points in a 111–79 win over the Milwaukee Bucks. On December 8, 2017, he set a new season high with 29 points in a 109–102 loss to Milwaukee. On January 24, 2018, he matched a pair of season highs with 29 points and seven 3-pointers in a 104–97 loss to the Houston Rockets. On February 13, 2018, in a 114–109 loss to Sacramento Kings, Matthews became the seventh Dallas player to hit 500 3-pointers with the team. On April 30, 2018, Matthews exercised his player option for the 2018–19 season.

In January 2019, Matthews became the sixth player in Mavericks history to make 600 3-pointers, and the first undrafted player in NBA history (and 31st overall) to make 1,500 3-pointers.

=== New York Knicks (2019) ===
On January 31, 2019, Matthews was traded to the New York Knicks in a multiplayer trade. On February 7, Matthews was waived by the Knicks after appearing in just two games for the team.

=== Indiana Pacers (2019) ===
On February 10, 2019, Matthews signed with the Indiana Pacers. On February 22, Matthews made 6 three-pointers and finished with 24 points, to lead the Pacers in a comeback win over the New Orleans Pelicans.

=== Milwaukee Bucks (2019–2020) ===
On July 12, 2019, Matthews signed with the Milwaukee Bucks.

On November 25, 2019, Matthews scored 19 points and grabbed 4 rebounds while starting in place of injured All-Star Khris Middleton in a game against the Utah Jazz. On December 22, he again scored 19 points, this time in a win against his previous team, the Pacers.

=== Los Angeles Lakers (2020–2021) ===
On November 22, 2020, Matthews signed with the Los Angeles Lakers. He appeared in 58 games for the Lakers, averaging only 4.8 points and a career-worst 33% 3-point shot percentage.

=== Return to Milwaukee (2021–2023) ===
On December 3, 2021, Matthews was signed by the Milwaukee Bucks. During Milwaukee's Christmas Day game, Matthews scored just 9 points, but gave the Bucks the lead by making a 3-point shot with 30 seconds left to help complete a 19-point come back, in a 117–113 win over the Boston Celtics. Matthews was inserted into the starting lineup by Mike Budenholzer towards the end of the regular season to provide a defensive presence alongside All-Defensive guard Jrue Holiday.

On July 6, 2022, Matthews re-signed with the Bucks.

=== Atlanta Hawks (2023–2024) ===
On July 22, 2023, Matthews signed with the Atlanta Hawks.

== Post-playing career ==
Matthews began a career as a broadcaster/analyst with his former team, the Milwaukee Bucks, and FanDuel Sports Network for 35 games in the 2025-26 season alongside play-by-play announcer Lisa Byington.

== Career statistics ==
Legend
| GP | Games played | GS | Games started | MPG | Minutes per game |
| FG% | Field goal percentage | 3P% | 3-point field goal percentage | FT% | Free throw percentage |
| RPG | Rebounds per game | APG | Assists per game | SPG | Steals per game |
| BPG | Blocks per game | PPG | Points per game | **Bold** | Career high |
| * | Led the league |

=== NBA ===
==== Regular season ====
| Year | Team | GP | GS | MPG | FG% | 3P% | FT% | RPG | APG | SPG | BPG | PPG |
|---|---|---|---|---|---|---|---|---|---|---|---|---|
| 2009–10 | Utah | **82*** | 48 | 24.7 | **.483** | .382 | .829 | 2.3 | 1.5 | .8 | .2 | 9.4 |
| 2010–11 | Portland | **82** | 69 | 33.6 | .449 | **.407** | .844 | 3.1 | 2.0 | 1.2 | .1 | 15.9 |
| 2011–12 | Portland | 66* | 53 | 33.8 | .412 | .383 | .860 | 3.4 | 1.7 | **1.5** | .2 | 13.7 |
| 2012–13 | Portland | 69 | 69 | **34.8** | .436 | .398 | .797 | 2.8 | 2.5 | 1.3 | .3 | 14.8 |
| 2013–14 | Portland | **82** | **82*** | 34.0 | .441 | .393 | .837 | 3.5 | 2.4 | 1.3 | .3 | **16.4** |
| 2014–15 | Portland | 60 | 60 | 33.7 | .448 | .389 | .752 | **3.7** | 2.3 | 1.3 | .2 | 15.9 |
| 2015–16 | Dallas | 78 | 78 | 33.9 | .388 | .360 | **.863** | 3.1 | 1.9 | 1.0 | .2 | 12.5 |
| 2016–17 | Dallas | 73 | 73 | 34.2 | .393 | .363 | .816 | 3.5 | **2.9** | 1.1 | .2 | 13.5 |
| 2017–18 | Dallas | 63 | 63 | 33.8 | .406 | .381 | .822 | 3.1 | 2.7 | 1.2 | .3 | 12.7 |
| 2018–19 | Dallas | 44 | 44 | 29.8 | .414 | .380 | .791 | 2.3 | 2.3 | .8 | .3 | 13.1 |
| 2018–19 | New York | 2 | 1 | 26.9 | .211 | .200 | .800 | 1.5 | 2.5 | .5 | **.5** | 7.0 |
| 2018–19 | Indiana | 23 | 23 | 31.5 | .386 | .369 | .854 | 2.8 | 2.4 | .9 | .2 | 10.9 |
| 2019–20 | Milwaukee | 67 | 67 | 24.4 | .396 | .364 | .765 | 2.5 | 1.4 | .6 | .1 | 7.4 |
| 2020–21 | L.A. Lakers | 58 | 10 | 19.5 | .353 | .335 | .854 | 1.6 | .9 | .7 | .3 | 4.8 |
| 2021–22 | Milwaukee | 49 | 14 | 20.5 | .395 | .338 | .786 | 1.9 | .7 | .5 | .2 | 5.1 |
| 2022–23 | Milwaukee | 52 | 0 | 15.8 | .363 | .315 | .857 | 2.2 | .7 | .4 | .3 | 3.4 |
| 2023–24 | Atlanta | 36 | 3 | 11.5 | .351 | .348 | .750 | 1.5 | .6 | .4 | .3 | 3.1 |
| Career | | 986 | 757 | 29.0 | .419 | .375 | .823 | 2.8 | 1.9 | .9 | .2 | 11.4 |

==== Playoffs ====
| Year | Team | GP | GS | MPG | FG% | 3P% | FT% | RPG | APG | SPG | BPG | PPG |
|---|---|---|---|---|---|---|---|---|---|---|---|---|
| 2010 | Utah | 10 | 10 | 37.1 | .386 | .357 | .813 | **4.4** | 1.7 | **1.8** | **.5** | 13.2 |
| 2011 | Portland | 6 | 6 | 33.7 | **.474** | .381 | .842 | 1.2 | 1.0 | .7 | .2 | 13.0 |
| 2014 | Portland | 11 | 11 | **38.7** | .412 | .324 | .813 | 3.8 | 1.3 | 1.3 | **.5** | **14.5** |
| 2016 | Dallas | 5 | 5 | 34.6 | .333 | .286 | .789 | 3.6 | 1.2 | 1.2 | .0 | 13.0 |
| 2019 | Indiana | 4 | 4 | 29.8 | .300 | .333 | **1.000** | 2.5 | **2.0** | .8 | .3 | 7.0 |
| 2020 | Milwaukee | 10 | 10 | 24.6 | .421 | .395 | .700 | 1.8 | .9 | .9 | .4 | 7.2 |
| 2021 | L.A. Lakers | 6 | 1 | 18.3 | .303 | .280 | **1.000** | 1.7 | .3 | .3 | .0 | 5.5 |
| 2022 | Milwaukee | **12** | **12** | 28.7 | .391 | .400 | .667 | 3.1 | 1.2 | .8 | .3 | 6.2 |
| 2023 | Milwaukee | 2 | 0 | 20.6 | .444 | **.571** | — | 1.5 | .5 | 1.0 | **.5** | 6.0 |
| Career | | 66 | 59 | 30.8 | .391 | .352 | .808 | 2.9 | 1.2 | 1.0 | .3 | 9.9 |

=== College ===
| Year | Team | GP | GS | MPG | FG% | 3P% | FT% | RPG | APG | SPG | BPG | PPG |
|---|---|---|---|---|---|---|---|---|---|---|---|---|
| 2005–06 | Marquette | 23 | 13 | 24.9 | .399 | **.438** | .788 | 4.0 | 2.2 | 1.3 | .2 | 9.0 |
| 2006–07 | Marquette | 34 | 34 | 31.2 | .438 | .288 | .770 | 5.3 | 2.2 | **1.4** | .1 | 12.6 |
| 2007–08 | Marquette | **35** | **35** | 28.9 | .434 | .313 | .790 | 4.4 | 1.7 | 1.0 | .3 | 11.3 |
| 2008–09 | Marquette | **35** | **35** | **34.0** | **.475** | .368 | **.829** | **5.7** | **2.5** | 1.2 | **.5** | **18.3** |
| Career | | 127 | 117 | 30.2 | .444 | .341 | .799 | 4.9 | 2.1 | 1.2 | .3 | 13.2 |

== See also ==
- List of National Basketball Association career 3-point scoring leaders
